= Kōen-Kami Station =

Funicular station in Hakone, Kanagawa Prefecture, Japan

Coordinates: 35°14′56.61″N 139°02′35.41″E

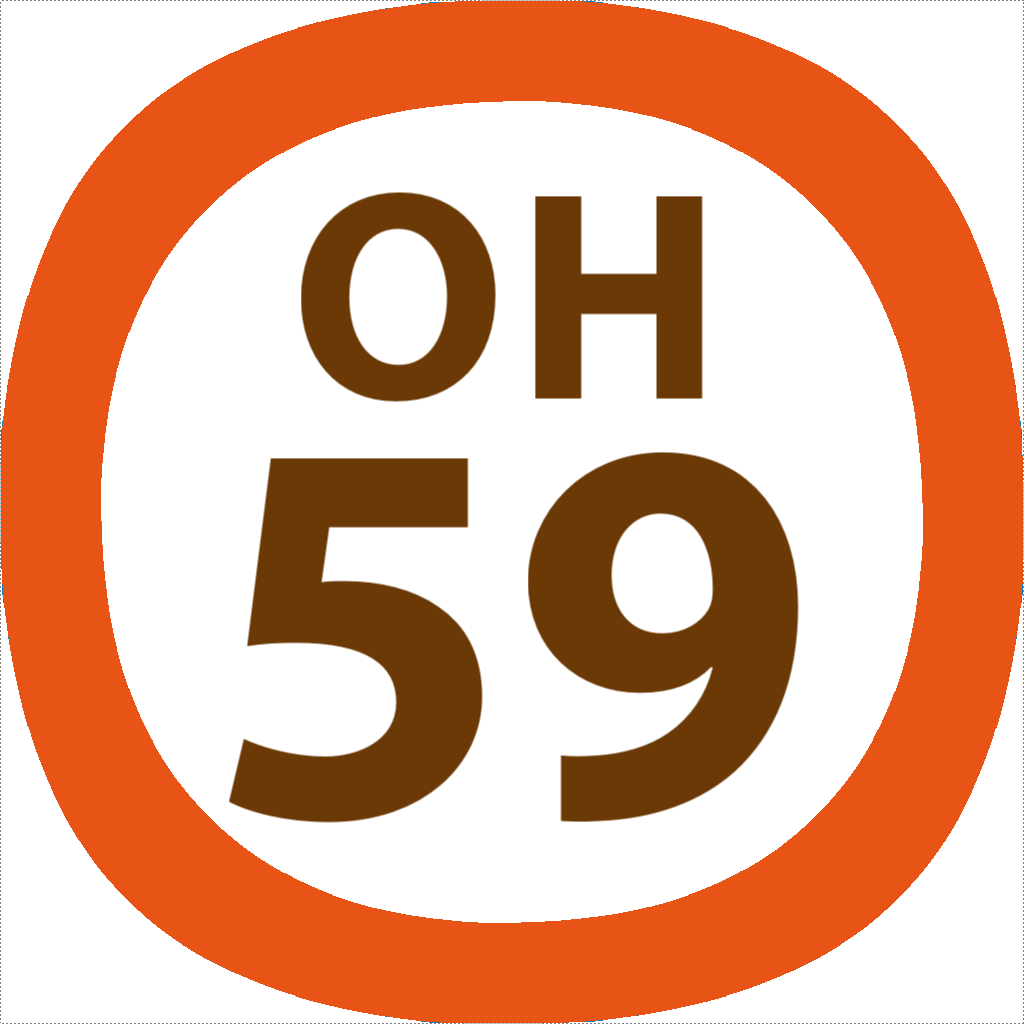
Kōen-Kami Station 公園上駅

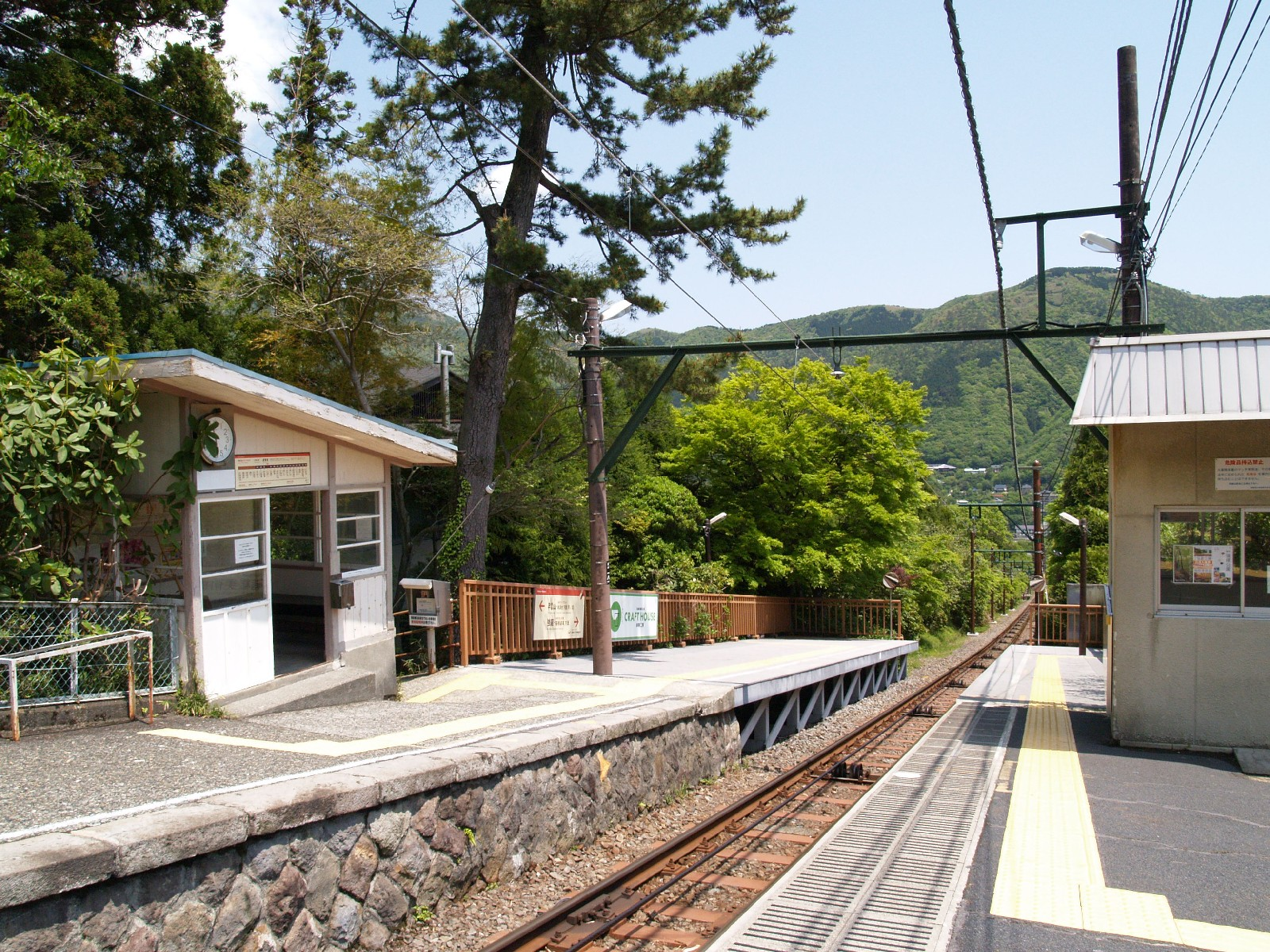
- The station platforms in May 2009

General information
- Location: Hakone, Ashigarashimo, Kanagawa （神奈川県足柄下郡箱根町） Japan
- Operator: Hakone Tozan Railway
- Line: Hakone Tozan Cable Car
- Platforms: 2 side platforms
- Tracks: 1
- Connections: Bus stop

History
- Opened: 1921

Services
Preceding station	Odakyu Hakone	Following station
Naka-Gōra towards Sōunzan	Cable Line	Kōen-Shimo towards Gōra
Location
- Location within Japan

Kōen-Kami Station (公園上駅, Kōen-Kami-eki) is a funicular railway station on the Hakone Tozan Cable Car Line in the town of Hakone, Ashigarashimo District, Kanagawa Prefecture, Japan, operated by Hakone Tozan Railway.

== Lines ==
Kōen-Kami Station is served by the Hakone Tozan Cable Car by odakyu rail, and is 0.48 km from the line's starting point at Gōra Station.

== Layout ==
The station has two opposed side platforms on either side of a single track. The station is unattended.

== History ==
Kōen-Kami Station opened on December 1, 1921, with the opening of the Hakone Tozan Cable Car Line. It was named after "the upside of Gora Park".

On 1 April 2024, operations of the station came under the aegis of Odakyu Hakone resulting from restructuring of Odakyu Group operations in the Hakone area.

== Bus services ==
- Bus stop "Hakone bijutsukan (Hakone Art Museum)" near this station (Hakone Tozan Bus).
  - for Gora Station, Hakone Open-Air Museum, Kowaki-en, Yunessun, and Ten-yu
  - for Pola Museum of Art, The Little Prince and Saint-Exupéry Museum, Senkyoro-mae (transfer for Togendai (Lake Ashi)), Hakone Venetian Glass Museum, Sengoku (transfer for Gotemba Premium Outlets, JR Gotemba Station and Shinjuku Station), Lalique Museum, and Hakone Botanical Garden of Wetlands

== See also ==
- List of railway stations in Japan
