= Kōen-Shimo Station =

Funicular station in Hakone, Kanagawa Prefecture, Japan

Coordinates: 35°14′59.75″N 139°02′44.35″E

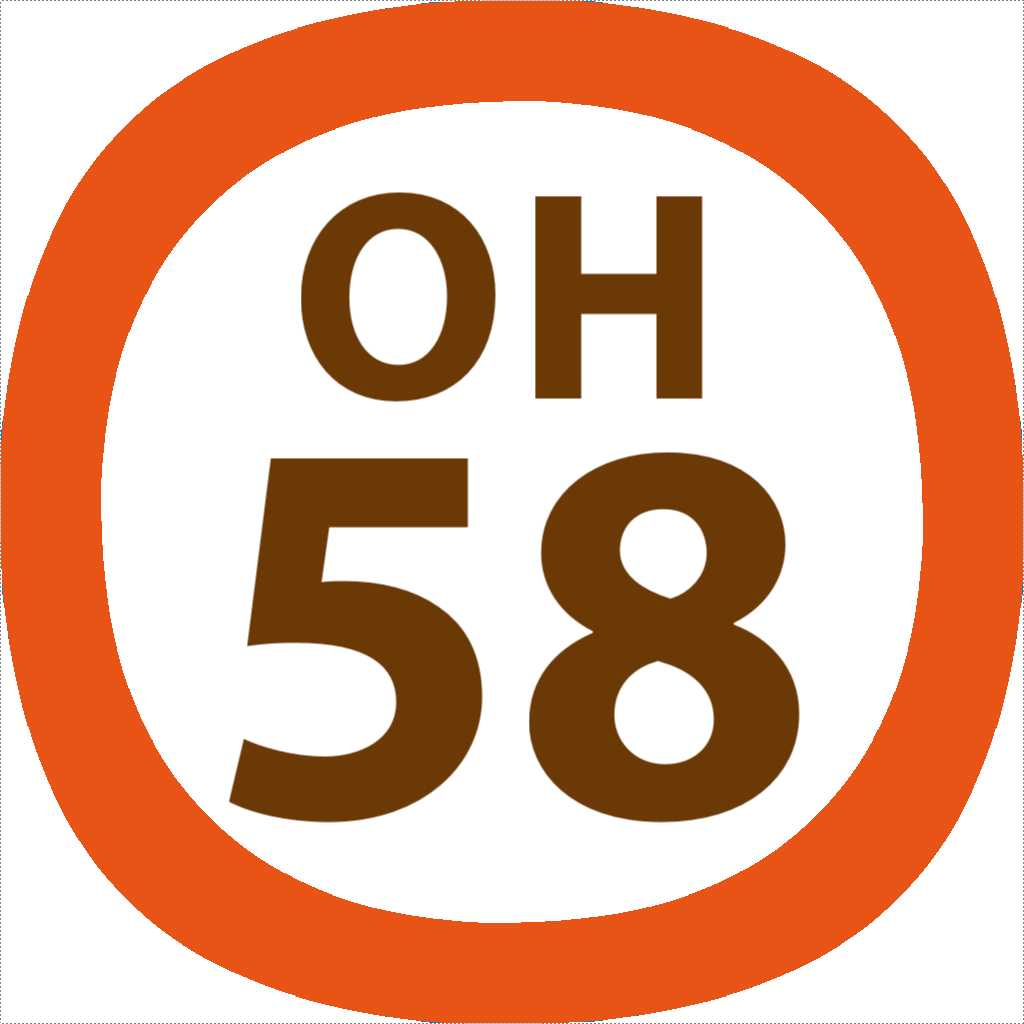
Kōen-Shimo Station 公園下駅

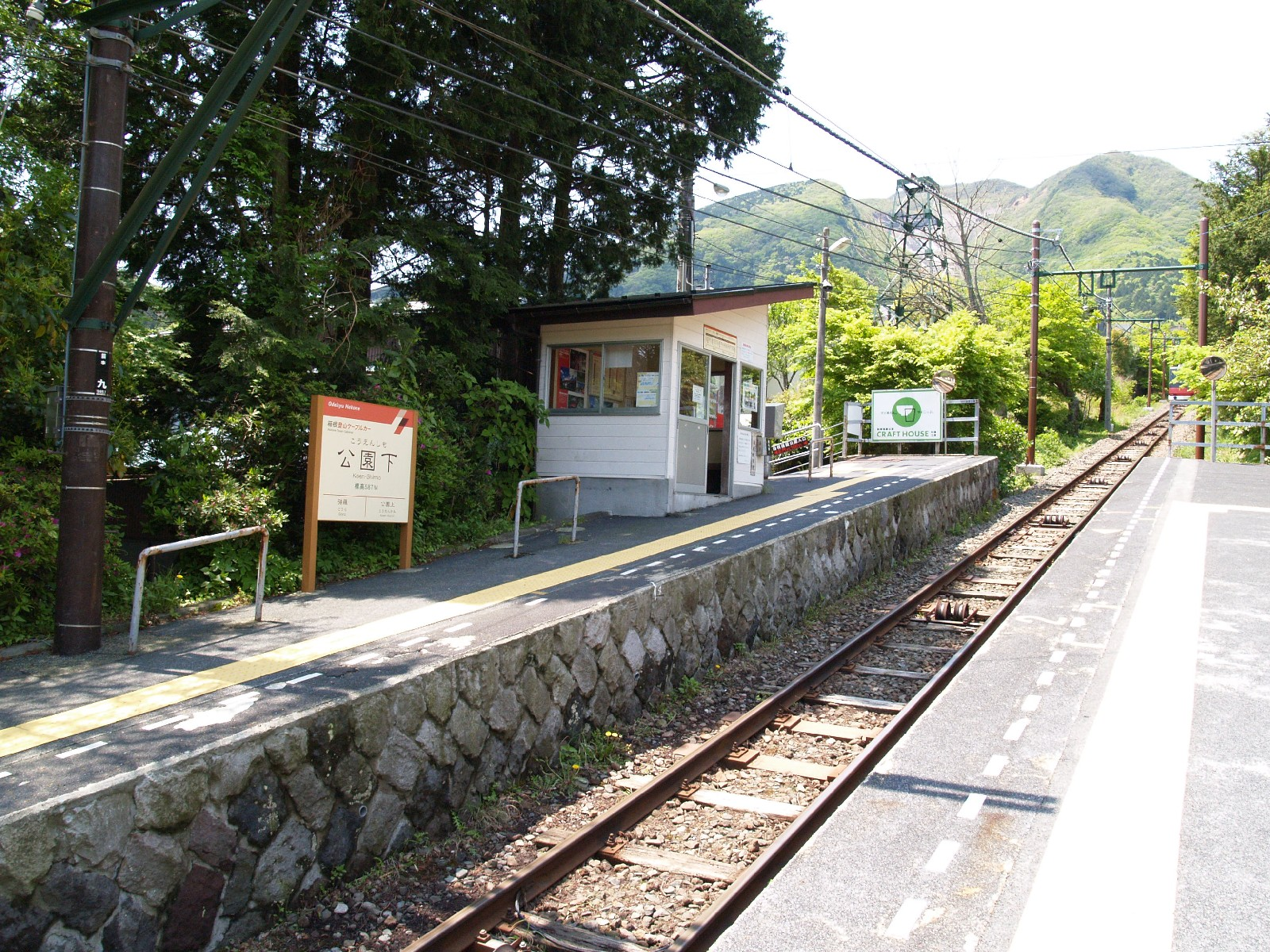
- Kōen-Shimo Platform

General information
- Location: Hakone, Ashigarashimo, Kanagawa （神奈川県足柄下郡箱根町） Japan
- Operator: Odakyu Hakone
- Line: Hakone Tozan Cable Car

History
- Opened: 1921

Services
Preceding station	Odakyu Hakone	Following station
Kōen-Kami towards Sōunzan	Cable Line	Gōra Terminus
Location

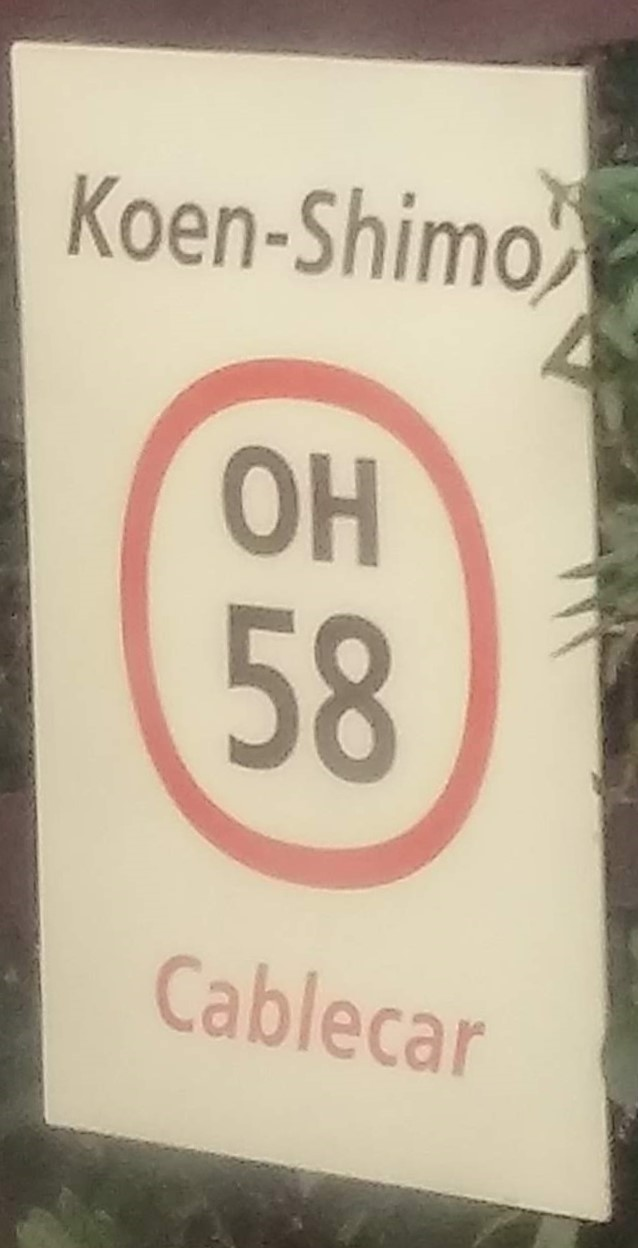
Station sign board

Kōen-Shimo Station (公園下駅, Kōen-Shimo-eki) is a funicular railway station on the Hakone Tozan Cable Car in the town of Hakone, Ashigarashimo District, Kanagawa Prefecture, Japan. It is 0.24 rail kilometers from the Hakone Tozan Cable Car Line's terminus at Gōra Station.

== History ==
Kōen-Shimo Station opened on December 1, 1921 with the opening of the Hakone Tozan Cable Car Line. It was named after "The downside of Gora Park".

On 1 April 2024, operations of the station came under the aegis of Odakyu Hakone resulting from restructuring of Odakyu Group operations in the Hakone area.

== Lines ==
- Hakone Tozan Railway
  - Hakone Tozan Cable Car

== Layout ==
Kōen-Shimo Station has two opposed side platforms serving a single track. The station is unattended.
