= Kami-Gōra Station =

Funicular station in Hakone, Kanagawa Prefecture, Japan

Coordinates: 35°14′50.24″N 139°02′17.24″E

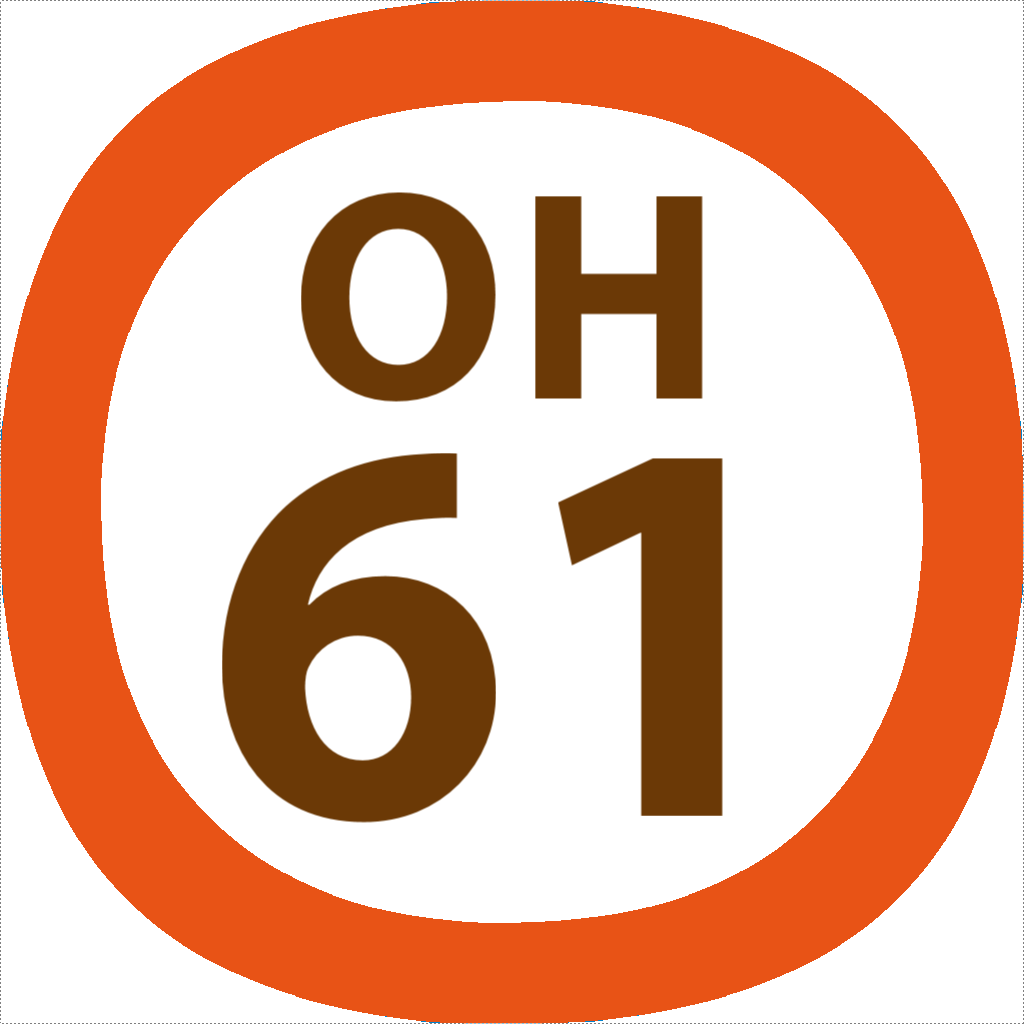
Kami-Gōra Station 上強羅駅

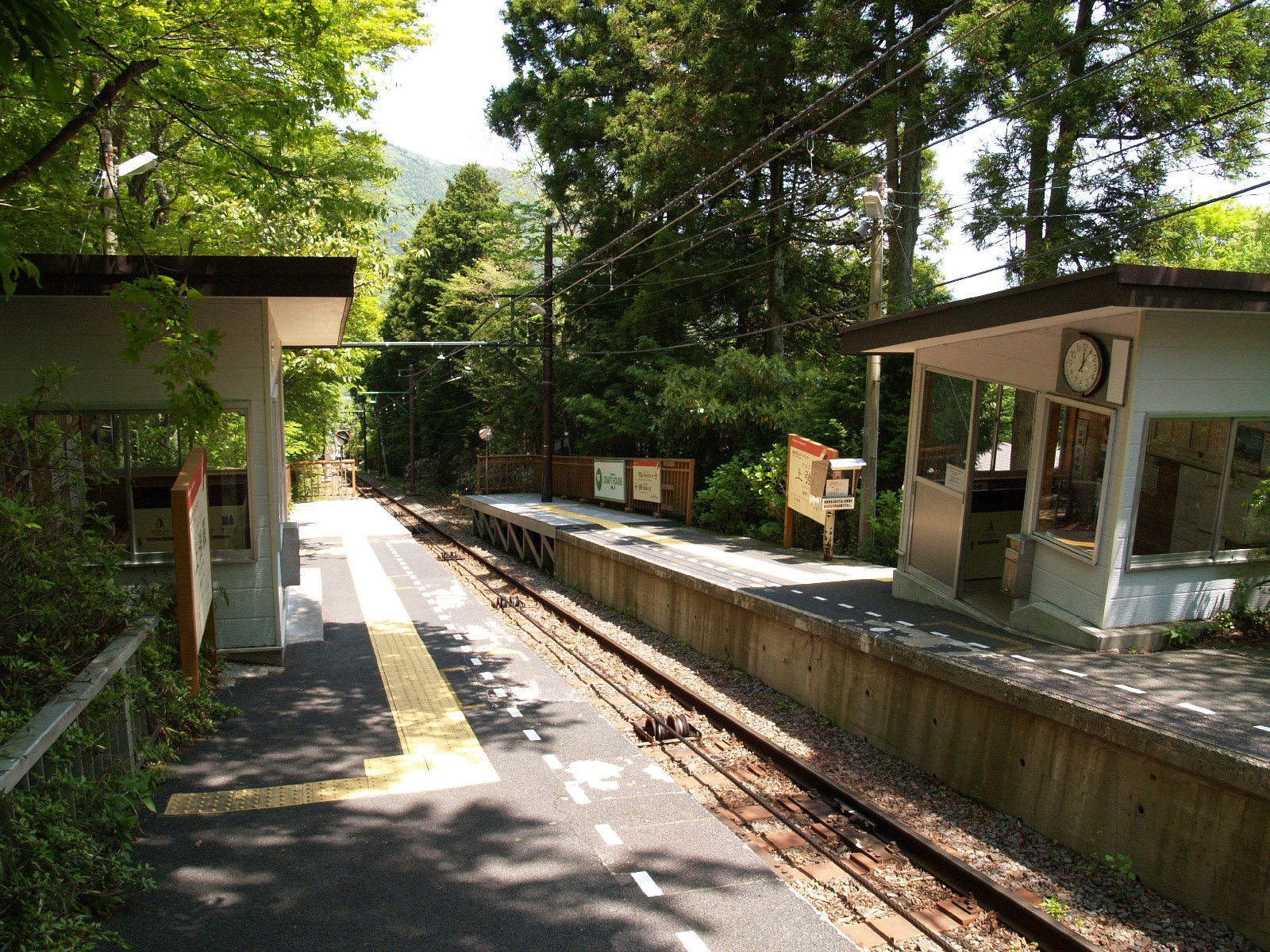
- Kami-Gōra Platform

General information
- Location: Hakone, Ashigarashimo, Kanagawa （神奈川県足柄下郡箱根町） Japan
- Operator: Hakone Tozan Railway
- Line: Hakone Tozan Cable Car

History
- Opened: 1921
- Former names: Sōunkan (until 1951)

Services
Preceding station	Odakyu Hakone	Following station
Sōunzan Terminus	Cable Line	Naka-Gōra towards Gōra
Location

Kami-Gōra Station (上強羅駅, Kami-Gōra-eki) is a funicular railway station on the Hakone Tozan Cable Car Line in the town of Hakone, Ashigarashimo District, Kanagawa Prefecture, Japan. It is 0.96 rail kilometers from the Hakone Tozan Cable Car Line's terminus at Gōra Station.

== History ==
Kami-Gōra Station opened on December 1, 1921 with the opening of the Hakone Tozan Cable Car Line as Sōunkan Station (早雲館, Sōunkan-eki). It assumed its present name in 1951.

On 1 April 2024, operations of the station came under the aegis of Odakyu Hakone resulting from restructuring of Odakyu Group operations in the Hakone area.

== Lines ==
- Hakone Tozan Railway
  - Hakone Tozan Cable Car

== Layout ==
Kami-Gōra Station has two opposed side platforms serving a single track. The station is unattended.
