= Naka-Gōra Station =

Funicular station in Hakone, Kanagawa Prefecture, Japan

Coordinates: 35°14′53.46″N 139°02′26.37″E

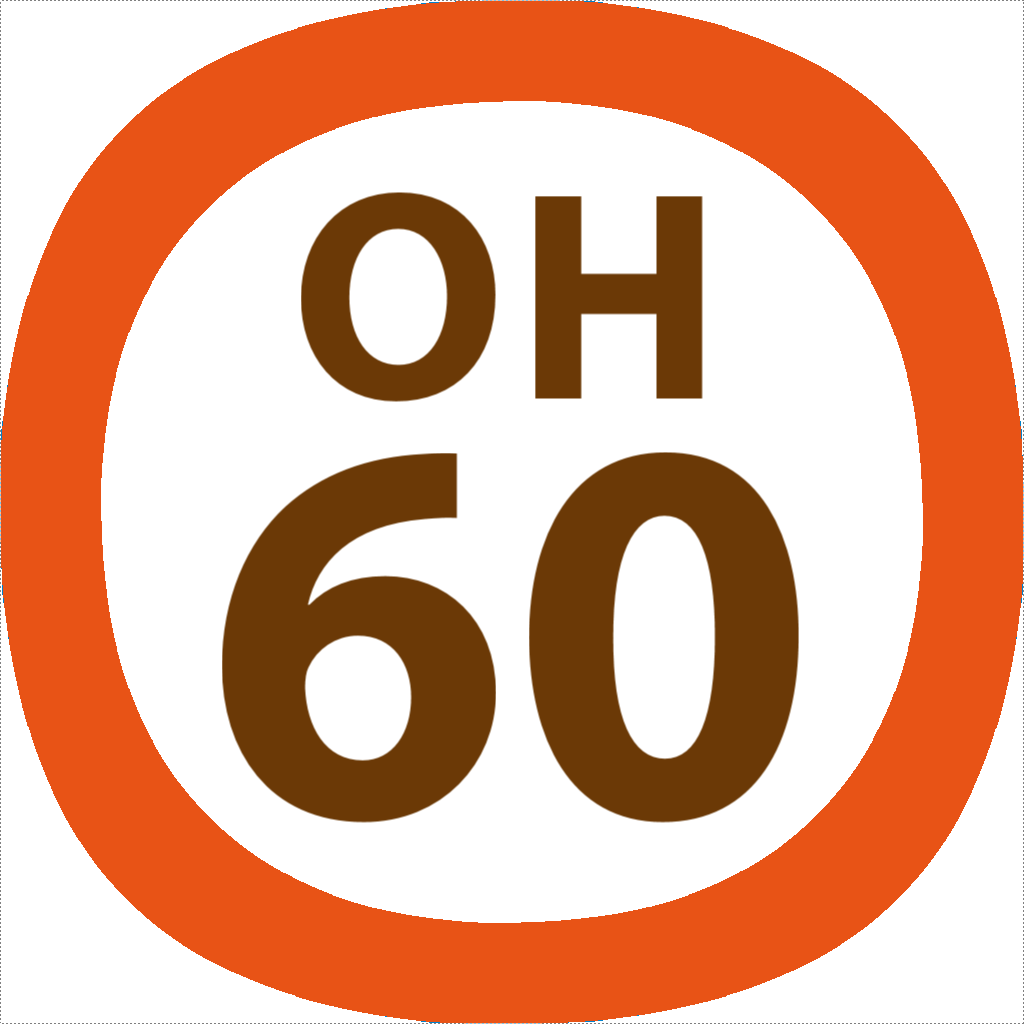
Naka-Gōra Station 中強羅駅

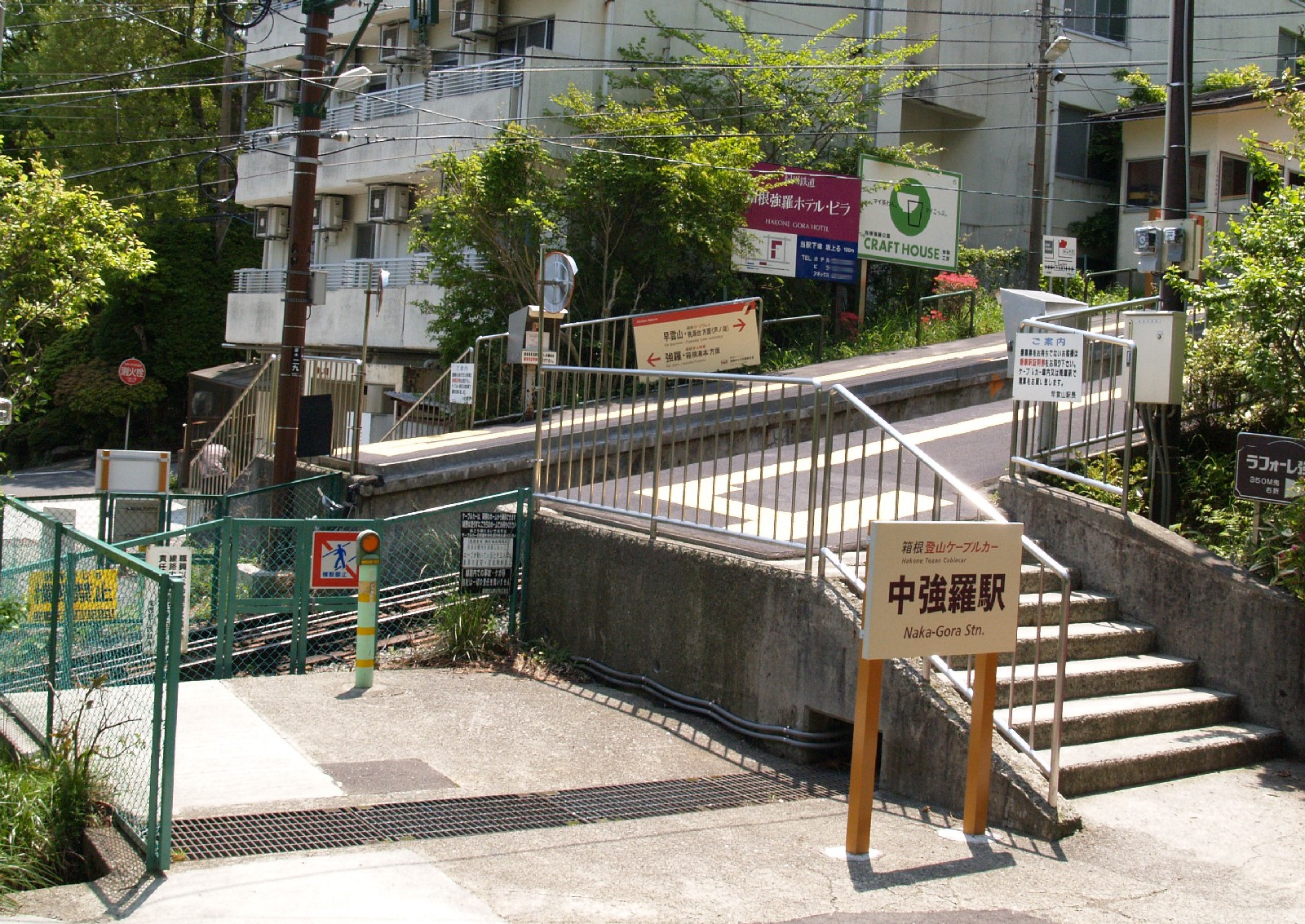
- Naka-Gōra Station Entrance

General information
- Location: Hakone, Ashigarashimo, Kanagawa （神奈川県足柄下郡箱根町） Japan
- Operator: Hakone Tozan Railway
- Line: Hakone Tozan Cable Car

History
- Opened: 1921

Services
Preceding station	Odakyu Hakone	Following station
Kami-Gōra towards Sōunzan	Cable Line	Kōen-Kami towards Gōra
Location

Naka-Gōra Station (中強羅駅, Naka-Gōra-eki) is a funicular railway station on the Hakone Tozan Cable Car Line in the town of Hakone, Ashigarashimo District, Kanagawa Prefecture, Japan. It is 0.72 rail kilometers from the Hakone Tozan Cable Car Line's terminus at Gōra Station.

== History ==
Naka-Gōra Station opened on December 1, 1921, with the opening of the Hakone Tozan Cable Car Line.

== Lines ==
- Hakone Tozan Railway
  - Hakone Tozan Cable Car

== Layout ==
Naka-Gōra Station has two opposed side platforms serving a single track. The station is unattended.
