= Hakone Tozan Cable Car =

Funicular railway in Japan

Coordinates: 35°14′55.1″N 139°2′30.8″E

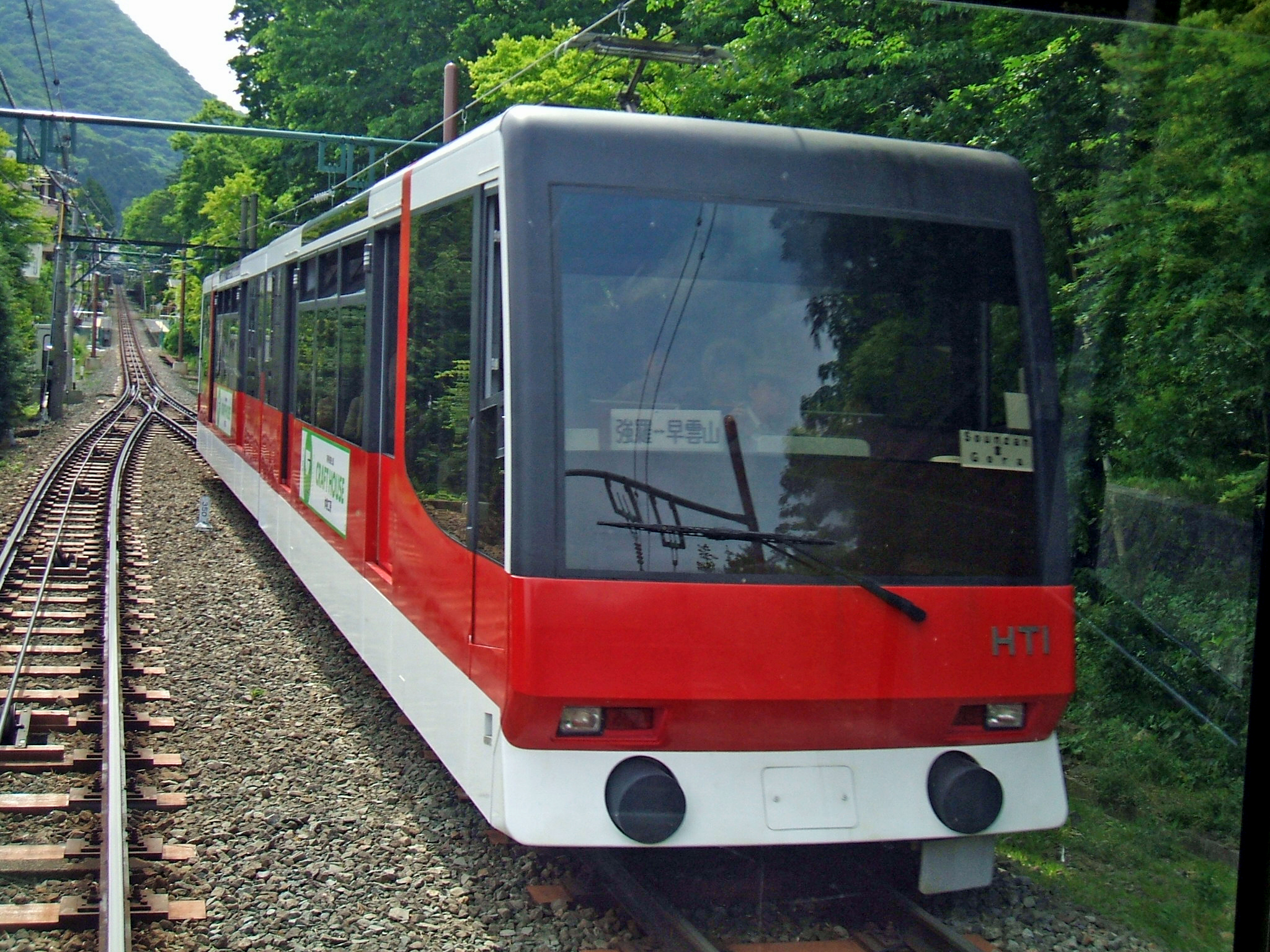
- Hakone Tozan Cable Car

Overview
- Native name: 箱根登山ケーブルカー
- Owner: Odakyu Group
- Locale: Hakone, Japan
- Termini: Gōra; Sōunzan
- Stations: 6
- Website: hakone-tozan.co.jp

Service
- Type: Funicular
- Operator: Odakyu Hakone
- Rolling stock: Two two-car trainsets (red and blue)

History
- Opened: 1922; 104 years ago

Technical
- Line length: 1.2 km (0.75 mi)
- Number of tracks: 1, with passing loop
- Track gauge: 985 mm (3 ft 2 25/32 in)
- Highest elevation: 761 m (2,497 ft)
- Maximum incline: 20%

The Hakone Tozan Cable Car (Japanese: 箱根登山ケーブルカー, Hepburn: Hakone Tozan Kēburukā), officially the Cable Line (鋼索線, Kōsaku-sen), is a funicular railway in the town of Hakone, Kanagawa, Japan. It is operated by Odakyu Hakone, a Odakyu Group company who also operates the Hakone Tozan Train.

The funicular links Gōra, the upper terminus of the railway line, with Sōunzan 214 metres (702 ft) above. At Sōunzan, connection is made with the Hakone Ropeway, which runs to Tōgendai on Lake Ashi.

Opened in 1922, the line was rebuilt in 1995, when new cars replaced the old. In March 2020, the cars were replaced again with two new two-car red and blue trainsets supplied by Keio Juuki Seibi Co. Each trainset is able to accommodate up to 250 passengers.

== Statistics ==
The line has the following technical parameters:

- Length: 1.2 kilometres (0.75 mi)
- Elevation gain: 208 metres (682 ft)
- Maximum incline: 20%
- Gauge: 985 mm (3 ft 2 25/32 in)
- Cars: 2
- Capacity: 250 passengers per car
- Configuration: Single track with passing loop
- Journey time: 9 minutes
- Traction: Electric

== Stations ==
All stations are located in Hakone, Kanagawa Prefecture.

No.	Station	Distance in km (mi)	Elevation in m (ft)	Transfers
OH57	Gōra 強羅	0 (0)	553 (1,814)	Hakone Tozan Line
OH58	Kōen-Shimo 公園下	0.24 (0.15)	587 (1,926)	
OH59	Kōen-Kami 中強羅	0.48 (0.30)	624 (2,047)	
OH60	Naka-Gōra 公園上	0.72 (0.45)	668 (2,192)	
OH61	Kami-Gōra 上強羅	0.96 (0.60)	717 (2,352)	
OH62	Sōunzan 早雲山	1.2 (0.75)	761 (2,497)	Hakone Ropeway

== See also ==
- List of funicular railways
