= Gōra Station =

Railway station in Hakone, Kanagawa Prefecture, Japan

Coordinates: 35°15′2.76″N 139°2′53.50″E

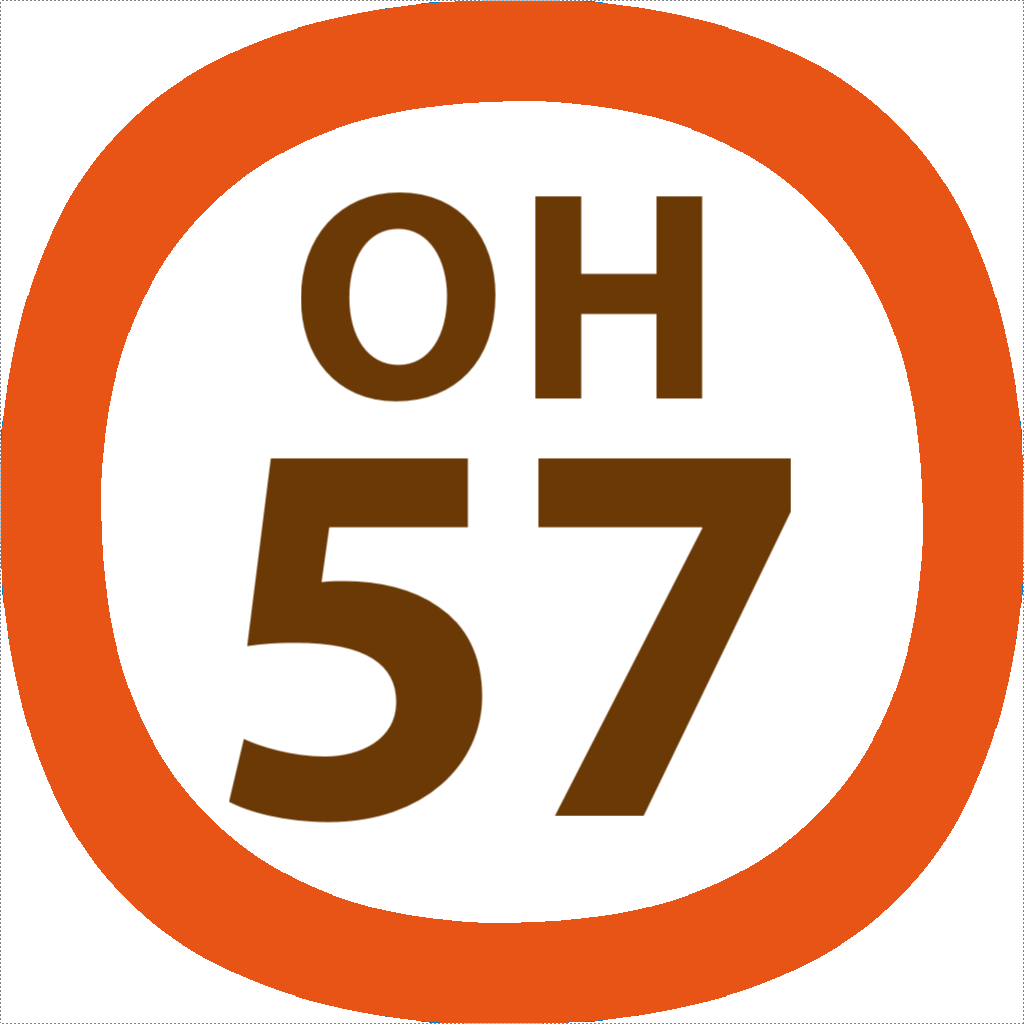
Gōra Station 強羅駅

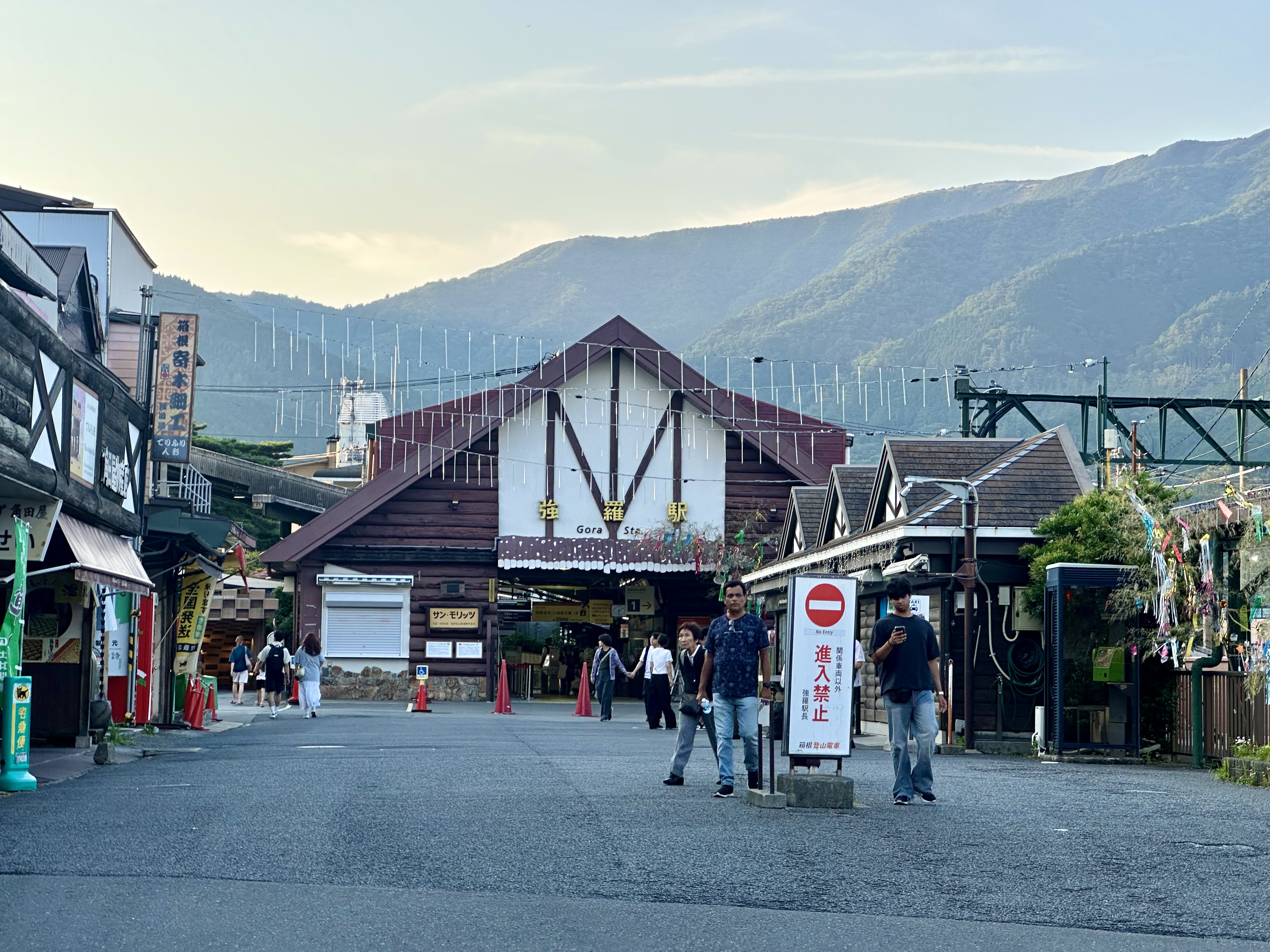
- Exterior of Gōra Station, June 2025

General information
- Location: 1300-329 Gōra, Hakone, Ashigarashimo, Kanagawa （神奈川県足柄下郡箱根町強羅1300-329） Japan
- Operator: Odakyu Hakone
- Lines: Hakone Tozan Line; Hakone Tozan Cable Car
- Connections: Bus stop

History
- Opened: 1919

Services
Preceding station	Odakyu Hakone	Following station
Terminus	Hakone Tozan Line	Chōkoku-no-Mori towards Hakone-Yumoto
Kōen-Shimo towards Sōunzan	Cable Line	Terminus
Location
- Location within Japan

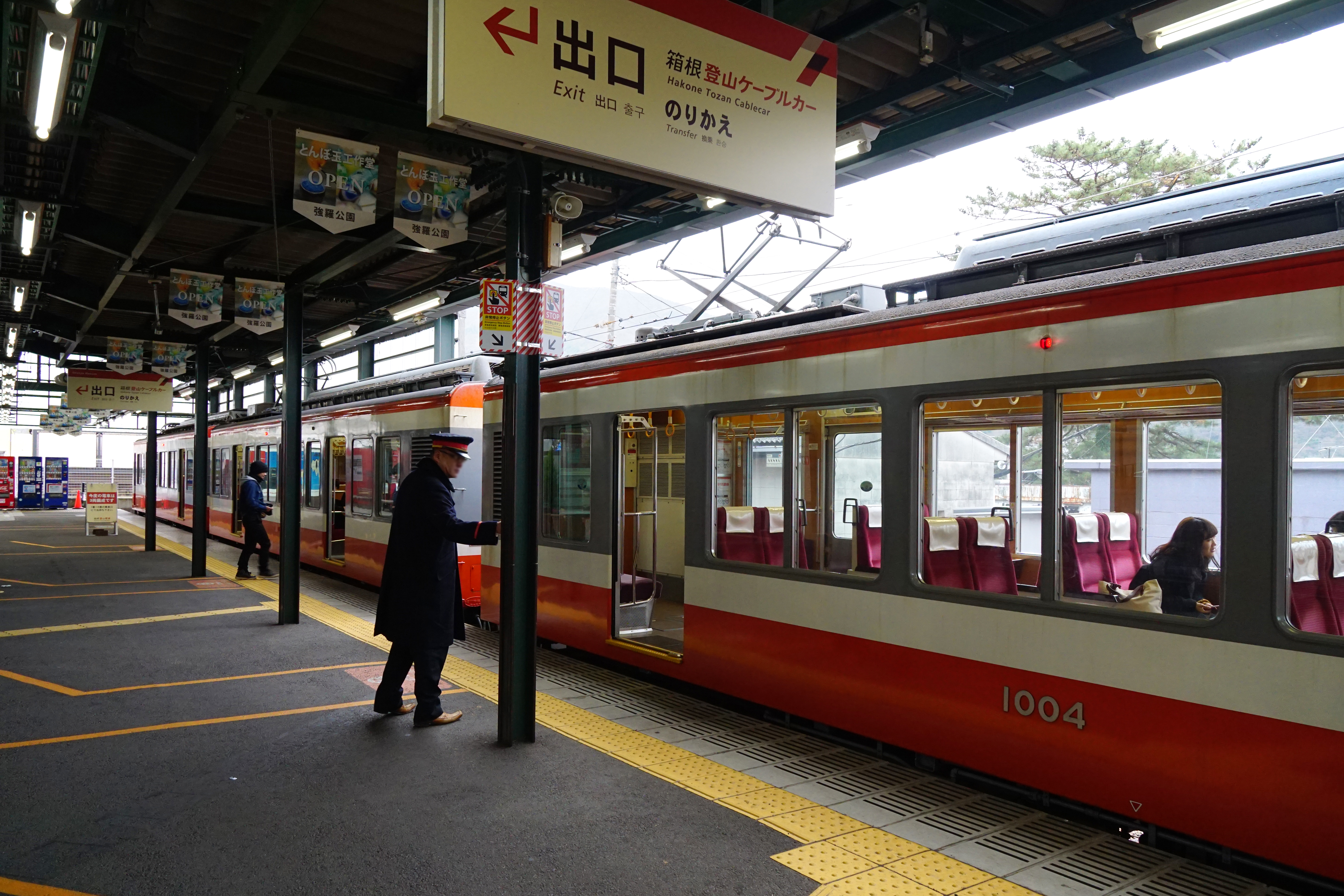
Hakone Tozan Line

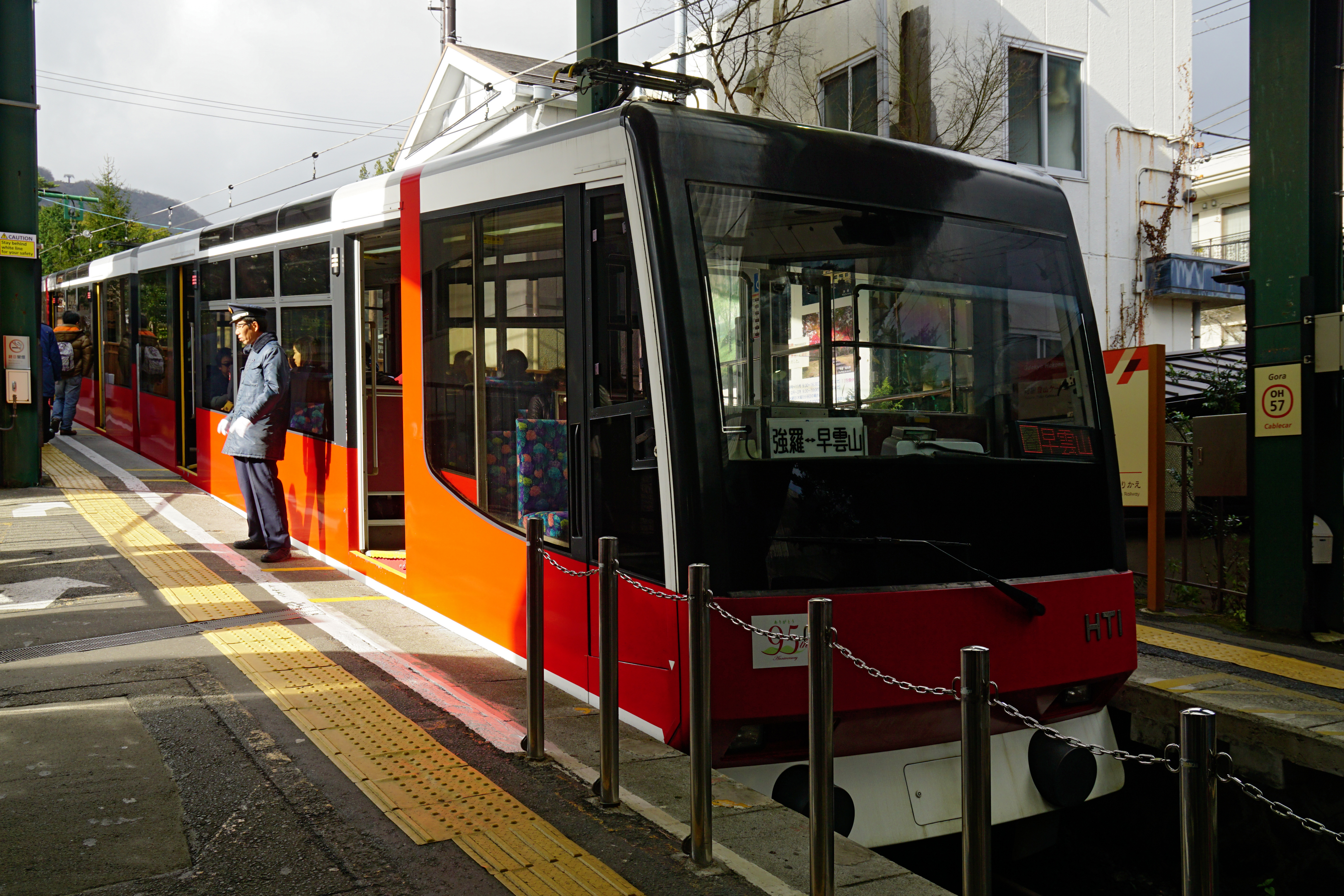
Hakone Tozan Cable Car

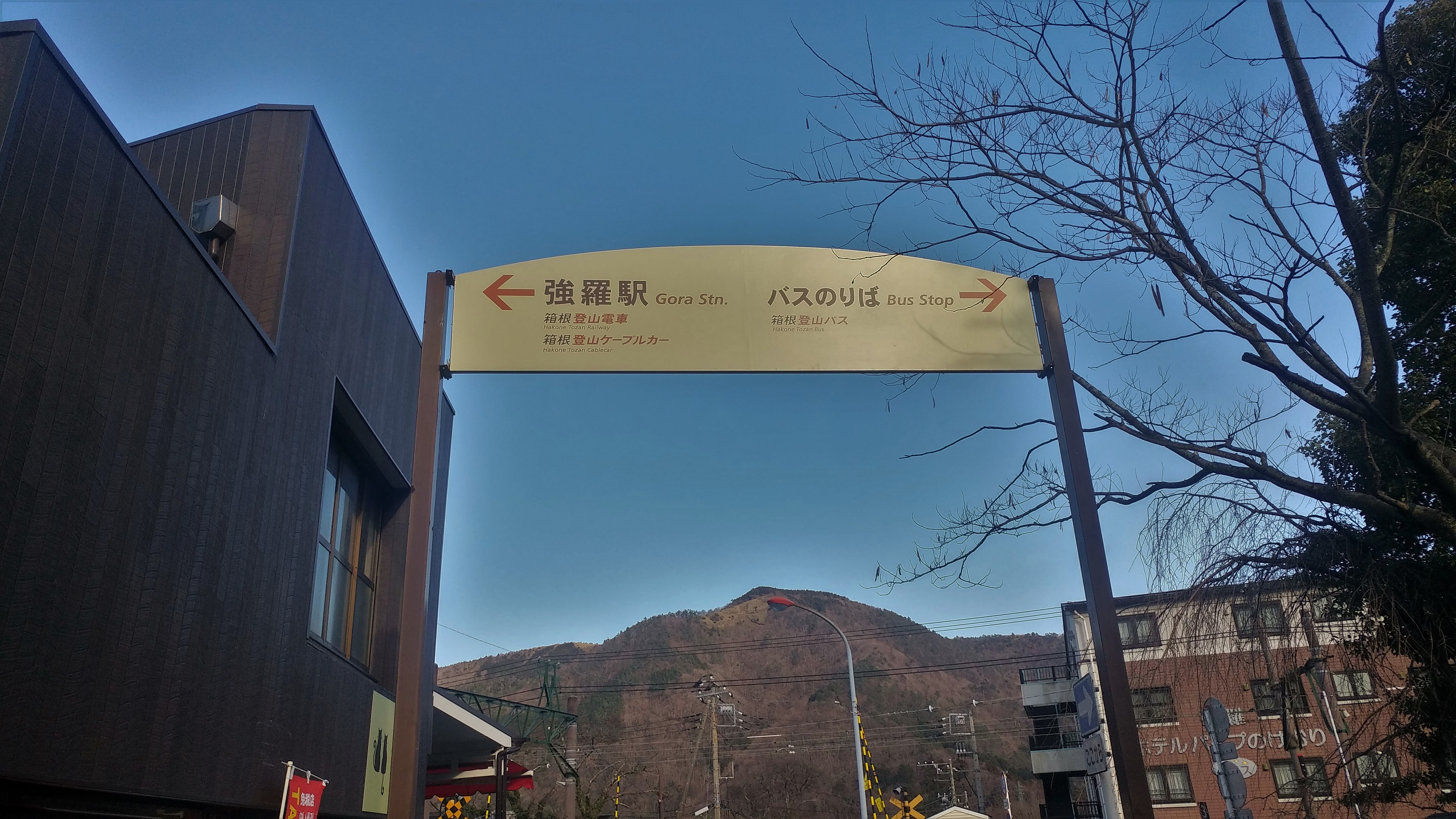
Information board near Gora Station

Gōra Station (強羅駅, Gōra-eki) is a terminal railway station on the Hakone Tozan Line as well as the Hakone Tozan Cable Car, and is located in Hakone, Kanagawa, Japan. It is 15.0 km from the Hakone Tozan Line's southern terminus at Odawara Station. At an altitude of 533 meters (1,749 ft), it is the highest railway station in Kanagawa Prefecture.

== Lines ==
Gōra Station is served by the Hakone Tozan Line and also by the Hakone Tozan Cable Car.

== Station layout ==
Gōra Station has two side platforms, which are staggered, so that they do not directly oppose each other.

== History ==
Gōra Station was opened on June 1, 1919 as a station on the Hakone Tozan Line. The Hakone Tozan Cable Car began operations from December 1, 1921, but operations were suspended from February 11, 1944 through July 1, 1950. The present station building was opened on April 16, 1977.

On 1 April 2024, operations of the station came under the aegis of Odakyu Hakone resulting from restructuring of Odakyu Group operations in the Hakone area.

== Bus services ==
- Hakone Tozan Bus
  - Bus stop 1
    - for Hakone Open-Air Museum, Kowaki-en (transfer for Moto-Hakone (Lake Ashi) direction), Yunessun, and Ten-yu
  - Bus stop 2
    - for Gora Park, Hakone Art Museum (Kōen-Kami Station), Pola Museum of Art, The Little Prince and Saint-Exupéry Museum, Senkyoro-mae (transfer for Togendai (Lake Ashi)), Hakone Venetian Glass Museum, Sengoku (transfer for JR Gotemba Station and Shinjuku Station), and Hakone Botanical Garden of Wetlands
  - Bus stop 3
    - for Miyagino, Hakone Venetian Glass Museum, Sengoku (transfer for Shinjuku Station), Otome Toge, Gotemba Premium Outlets, and JR Gotemba Station
  - Bus stop (Extra)
    - for Hakone Yumoto Station via Chōkoku-no-Mori Station, Kowakidani Station, Miyanoshita, and Ohiradai Station
