= Zugerberg =

Mountain in Switzerland

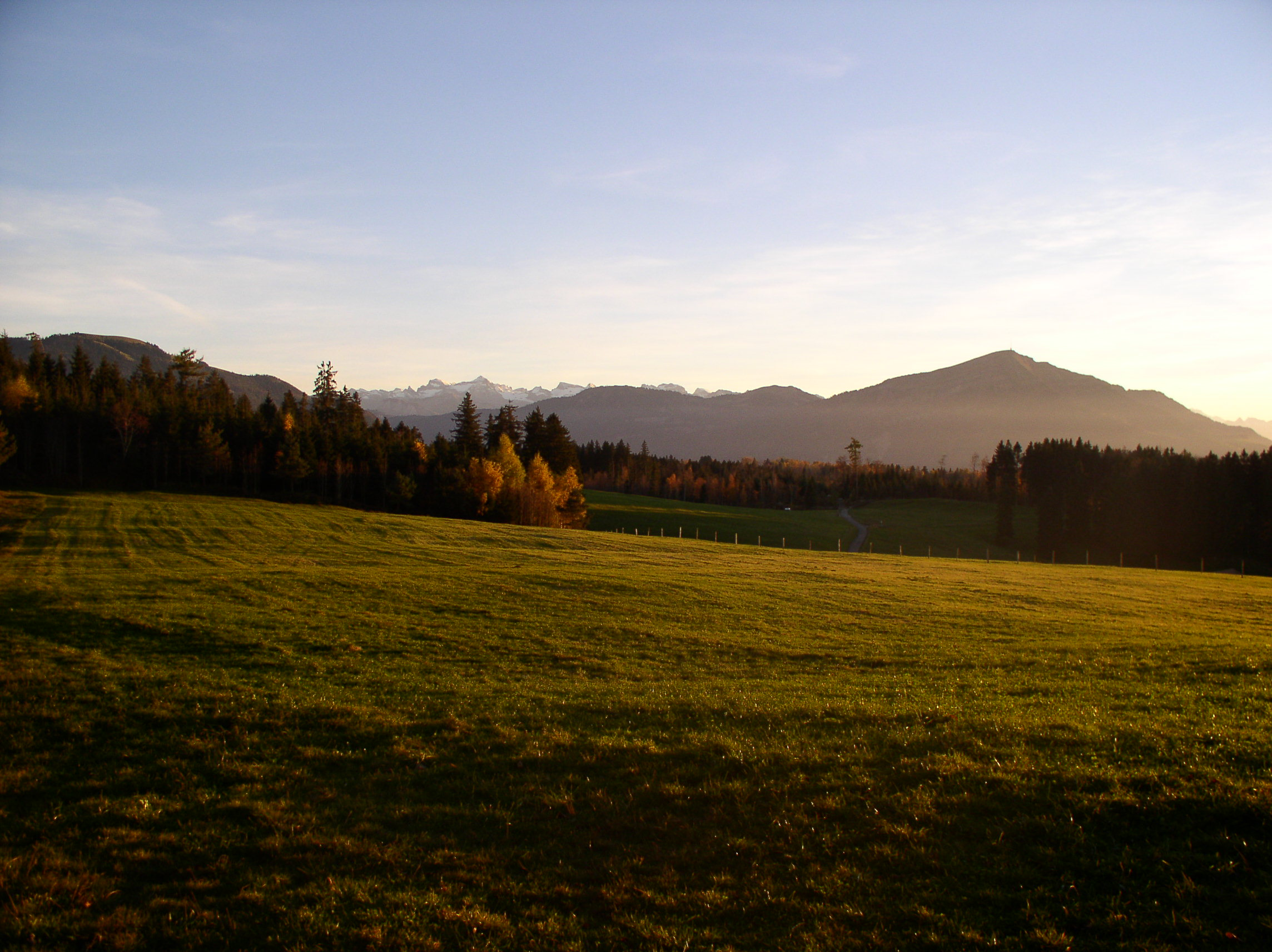
- Zugerberg from the south

Highest point
- Peak: Hünggigütsch
- Elevation: 1,039 m (3,409 ft)
- Prominence: 79 m (259 ft)
- Coordinates: 47°08′21″N 8°32′18″E

Geography
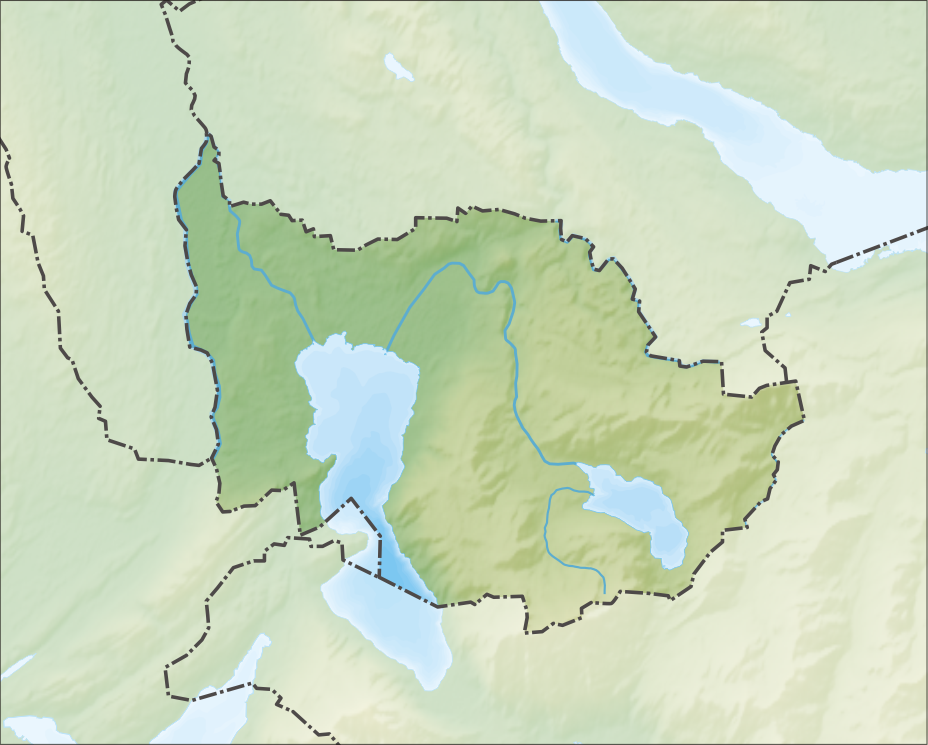
- Location within Canton of Zug Location within Switzerland
- Location: Zug
- Country: Switzerland
- Parent range: Schwyzer Alps
- Topo map: Swiss Federal Office of Topography swisstopo

The Zugerberg is a mountain overlooking Zug and Lake Zug in the Zug. It lies approximately halfway between Lake Zug and Lake Ägeri.

The Zugerbergbahn funicular connects the Zugerberg from Zug. The upper station is located at a height of 925 metres and is a popular vantage point as well as a recreational area. The summit proper is entirely wooded.

A road pass named Sätteli (975 m) is located north of the summit.

== Bibliography ==
- "Zugerberg". Zug-Tourismus. 2009. Archived from the original on 2009-04-28.
