= Hakone Park =

Park in Hakone, Japan

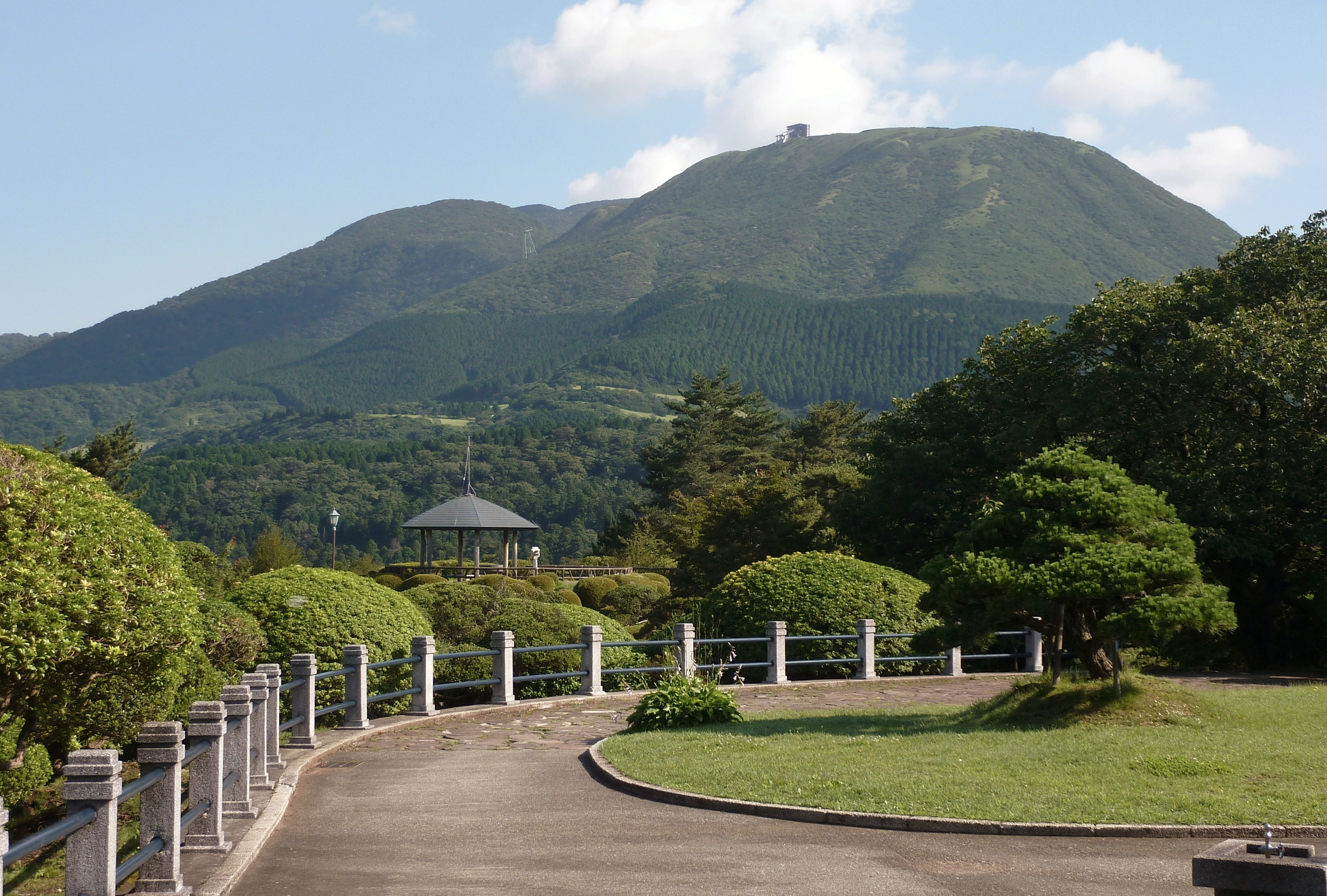
A view of Mt. Koma of the Hakone Mountains from Hakone Park

Hakone Park (Japanese: 恩賜箱根公園 = Onshi Hakone Koen, meaning Royally Given Hakone Park) is a prefectural park, located in Hakone Town, Kanagawa Prefecture, Japan. It occupies the 15.9 hectare Tōgshima peninsula jotting out to Lake Ashi.

Hakone Park, established as a villa and summer retreat for the Emperor and Empress in 1886, was given to the public in 1946, and became a prefectural park. It is one of the popular places for recreational outing in Fuji-Hakone-Izu National Park.

== See also ==
- Ueno Park
