= Zugerberg Funicular =

Funicular at Zug, Switzerland

Zugerbergbahn
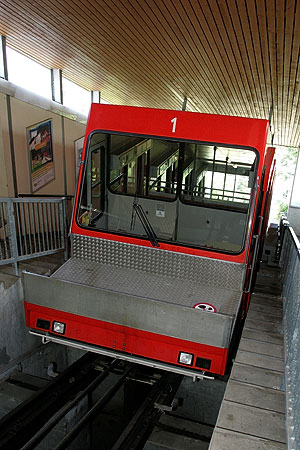
- A third generation car at the upper station in 2005

Overview
- Other name: Standseilbahn Schönegg-Zugerberg
- Status: In operation
- Owner: Zugerbergbahn AG (current name); Zuger Bergbahn und Bus AG, Zuger Berg- und Strassenbahn AG
- Locale: Canton of Zug, Switzerland
- Coordinates: 47.147875°N 8.526335°E
- Termini: Schönegg; Zugerberg
- Stations: 2
- Website: zbb.ch

Service
- Type: Funicular
- Services: 2566 (earlier: 1562)
- Operator(s): Zugerbergbahn AG
- Rolling stock: 2 for 80 passengers each

History
- Opened: 14 May 1907 (118 years ago)

Technical
- Track length: 1,280 m (4,199 ft)
- Track gauge: 985 mm (3 ft 2 25/32 in)
- Electrification: from opening
- Highest elevation: 927 m (3,041 ft)
- Maximum incline: 34%

The Zugerbergbahn is a funicular railway in the southern-eastern suburbs of the Swiss city of Zug, in the canton of Zug. The line links the Zug suburb of Schönegg with the Zugerberg mountain overlooking the city and Lake Zug. The line has a length of 1280 m and a difference of elevation of 366 m.

It is operated by the company Zugerbergbahn AG.

== History ==
The line opened in the spring of 1907, and was owned and operated by the Zuger Berg- und Strassenbahn AG (ZBB). This company also operated a connecting 985 mm (3 ft 2 25/32 in) electric tramway that linked Schönegg with Zug railway station. In 1959, the ZBB replaced its tram service with a bus service, and this was transferred to the Zugerland Verkehrsbetriebe bus company in 1999. At the same time, the ZBB adopted the name Zugerbergbahn AG.

The cars were first replaced in 1931, whilst the lower and upper stations were rebuilt in 1950-52 and 1970/71 respectively. The railway was comprehensively modernized and renovated in 1984, when a third generation of cars was installed. Further renovation work carried out in 2009, when new fourth generation panoramic cars were installed and the line adapted for use by wheelchair users.

== Operation ==
The line operates every 30 minutes from 06:00 (07:00 on Saturdays and Sundays) to 23:00. It has the following parameters:

Feature	Value
Number of cars	2
Number of stops	2 (at terminals)
Configuration	Single track with passing loop
Track length	1,280 m (4,199 ft)
Rise	366 metres (1,201 ft)
Maximum gradient	47%
Track gauge	985 mm (3 ft 2 25/32 in)
Capacity	80 passengers per car
Maximum speed	4 metres per second (13.1 ft/s)
Travel time	6 minutes

Bus service 11 of the Zugerland Verkehrsbetriebe connects the lower station of the funicular with the centre of Zug and Zug railway station, with buses connecting with all scheduled funicular services.

== See also ==
- List of funicular railways
- List of funiculars in Switzerland
