= Sōunzan Station =

Cable car and fumicular station in Hakone, Kanagawa Prefecture, Japan

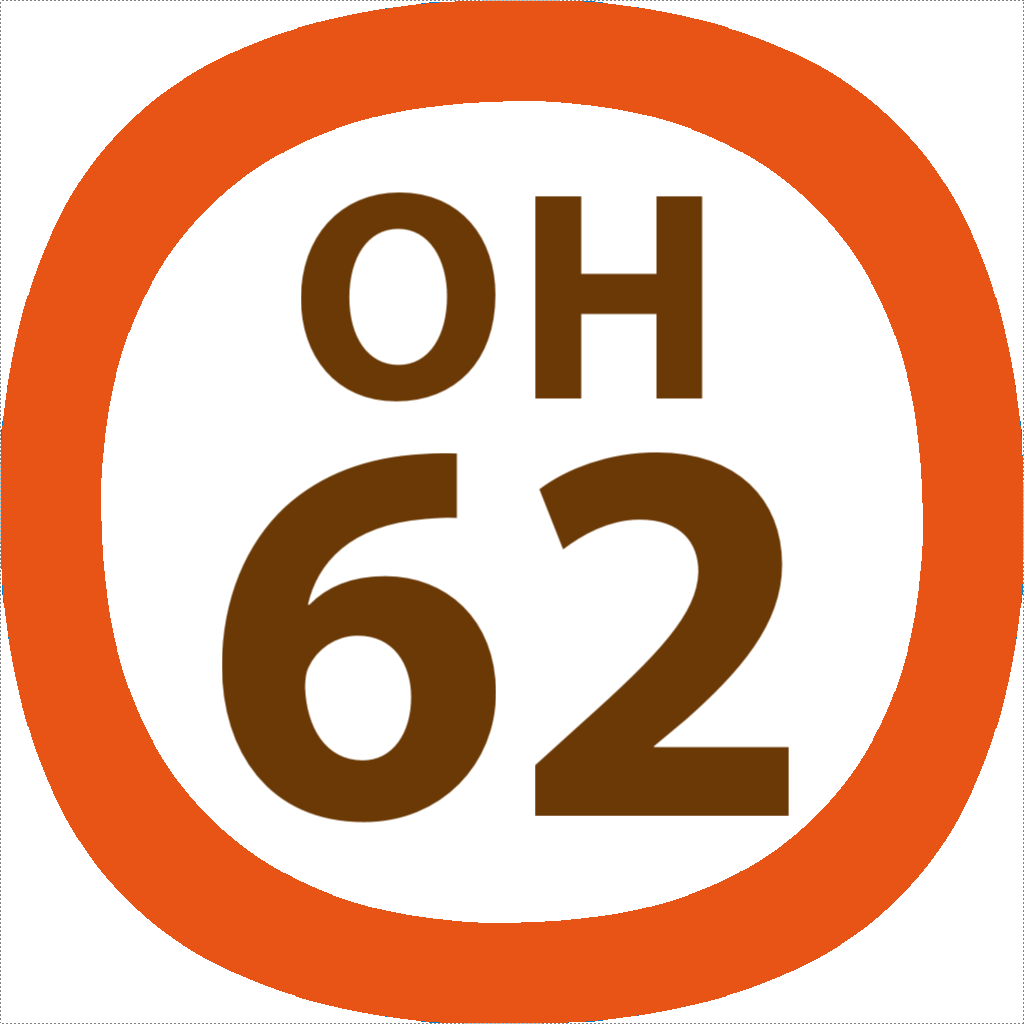
Sōunzan Station 早雲山駅

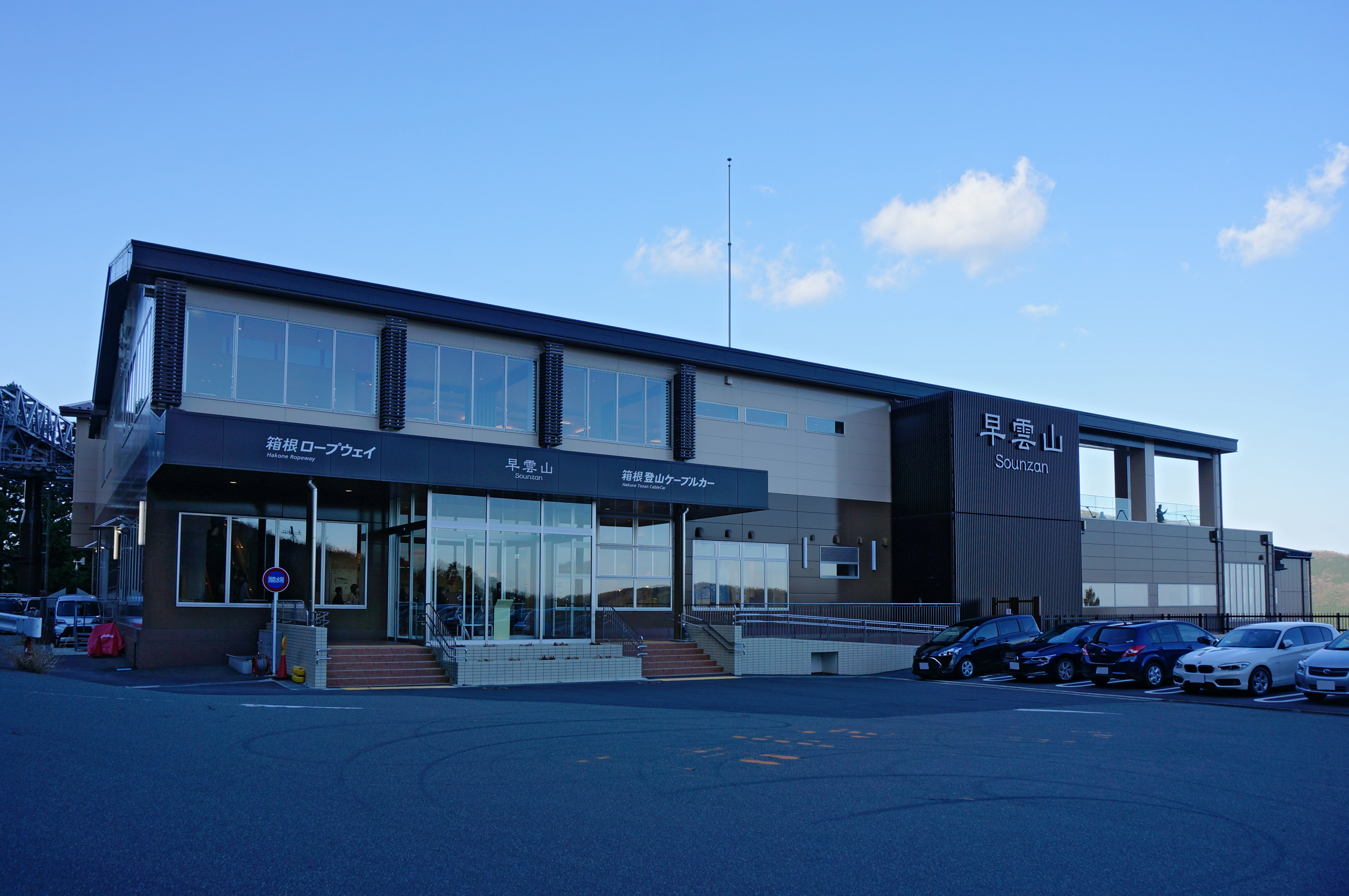
- Sōunzan Station

General information
- Location: Hakone, Ashigarashimo, Kanagawa; Japan
- Operator: Odakyu Hakone

History
- Opened: 1921

Services
Preceding station	Odakyu Hakone	Following station
Terminus	Cable Line	Kami-Gōra towards Gōra
Preceding station	Hakone Ropeway	Following station
Ōwakudani towards Tōgendai	Hakone Ropeway	Terminus
Location
- Location within Japan

Sōunzan Station (Japanese: 早雲山駅, Hepburn: Sōunzan-eki) is a terminal funicular railway station on the Hakone Tozan Cable Car Line in the town of Hakone, Ashigarashimo District, Kanagawa Prefecture, Japan. It is 1.2 kilometers (0.75 mi) by rail from the Hakone Tozan Cable Car Line's opposing terminus at Gōra Station. It is also the lower terminus for the Hakone Ropeway, from Tōgendai Station, and is located at an altitude of 767 meters (2,516 ft).

== History ==
Sōunzan Station opened on December 1, 1921 with the opening of the Hakone Tozan Cable Car Line.

On 1 April 2024, operations of the station came under the aegis of Odakyu Hakone resulting from restructuring of Odakyu Group operations in the Hakone area.

== Lines ==
- Hakone Tozan Cable Car
- Hakone Ropeway

== Layout ==
Sōunzan Station on the Hakone Tozan Cable Car has a bay platform serving one track. The station is elevated to incorporate the cable winding equipment necessary for the operation of funicular railway and the cable car. The boarding area for the Hakone Cable Car is on the second floor, with access by stairs or by elevator, as the station is built barrier free for use by handicapped customers.

== Bus services ==
Izuhakone Bus 早雲山駅入口 (Sōunzan-eki-iriguchi) Bus Stop 35.246695°N 139.034436°E

- "J" line for Hakone-en (Lake Ashi) via Ōwakudani, Kojiri
- "J" line for Odawara Station via Kowaki-en, Kowakidani Station, Miyanoshita, Hakone-Yumoto Station
