= Lake Ashi =

Crater lake in Japan

Lake Ashi 芦ノ湖
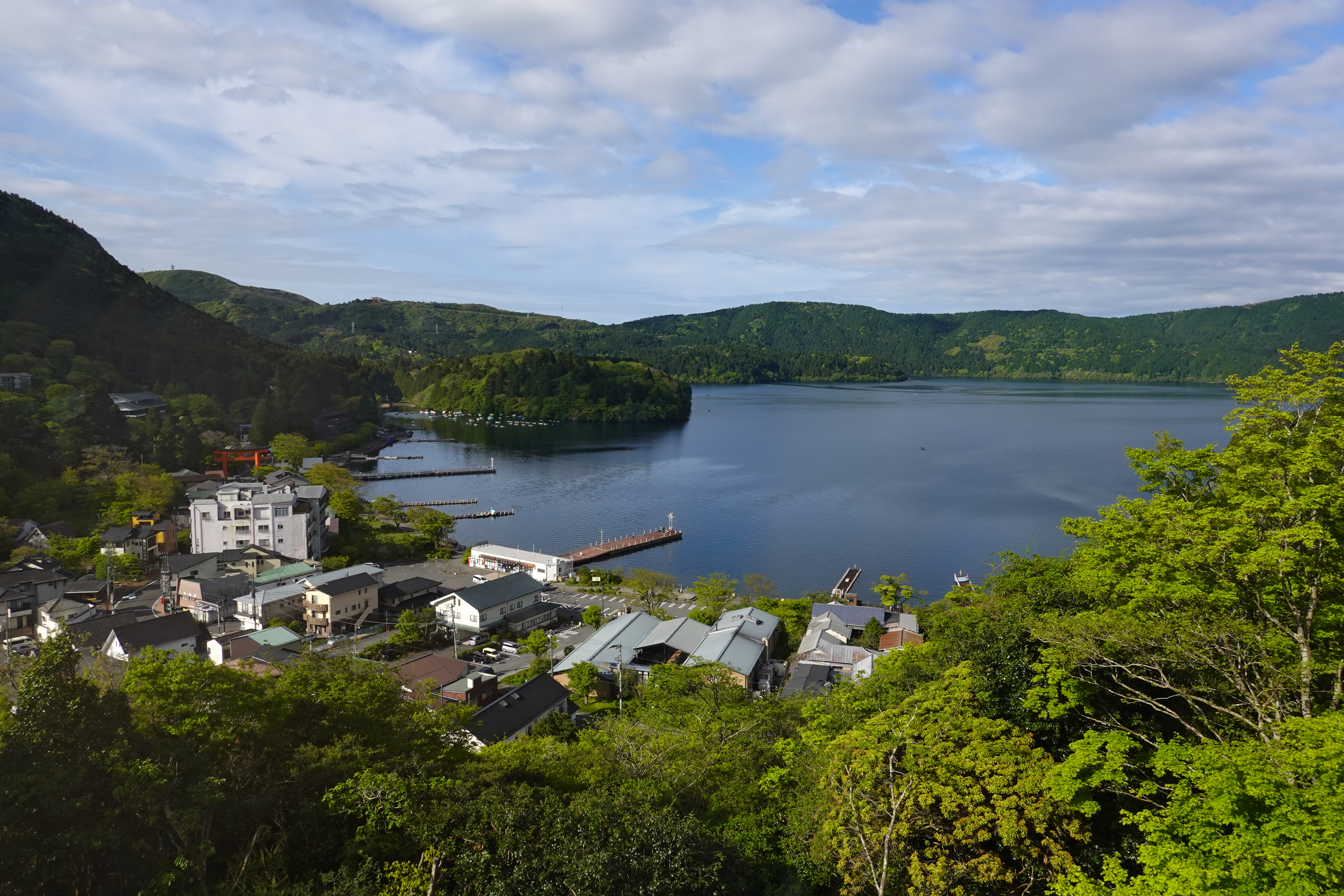
- Lake Ashi view from Moto-Hakone

- Location within Japan
- Location: Kanagawa Prefecture, Honshū
- Coordinates: 35°12′35″N 139°0′16″E
- Basin countries: Japan
- Surface area: 7.03 km^{2} (2.71 sq mi)
- Average depth: 15 m (49 ft)
- Max. depth: 43.5 m (143 ft)
- Shore length^{1}: 21.1 km (13.1 mi)
- Surface elevation: 723 m (2,372 ft)
- ^{1} Shore length is not a well-defined measure.

Lake Ashi (芦ノ湖, Ashi-no-ko), also known as Hakone Lake or Ashinoko Lake, is a scenic lake in the Hakone area of Kanagawa Prefecture on Honshū, Japan. It is a crater lake situated along the southwestern wall of the caldera of Mount Hakone, a complex volcano that last erupted in 1170 CE at Ōwakudani. The lake is known for its views of Mount Fuji, its numerous hot springs, historic sites, and traditional ryokan. It lies along the historic Tōkaidō road, the main route linking Kyoto and Tokyo. Pleasure boats and ferries operate on the lake, several of which are styled after sailing warships.

Many visitors to Lake Ashi stay in nearby hotels or ryokan while visiting local attractions. A campsite is located at the northern end of the lake. Hakone Shrine, which has been visited by shōgun, samurai, and travelers for centuries, is situated along the shore, and large sections of the Old Tōkaidō road are preserved in the area. Onshi Park, established in 1886 as a summer retreat for the imperial family, is now open to the public.

The lake’s name means "lake of reeds" in Japanese, from 芦 (ashi, "reed") and 湖 (ko, "lake"). Its surrounding natural environment makes it popular with hikers, and numerous trails of varying difficulty are found in the area.

Lake Ashi drains via the Fukara Aqueduct toward Susono, Shizuoka, following its completion in 1670, rather than into the Haya River toward Odawara, Kanagawa.

== Hakone Sightseeing Cruise ==
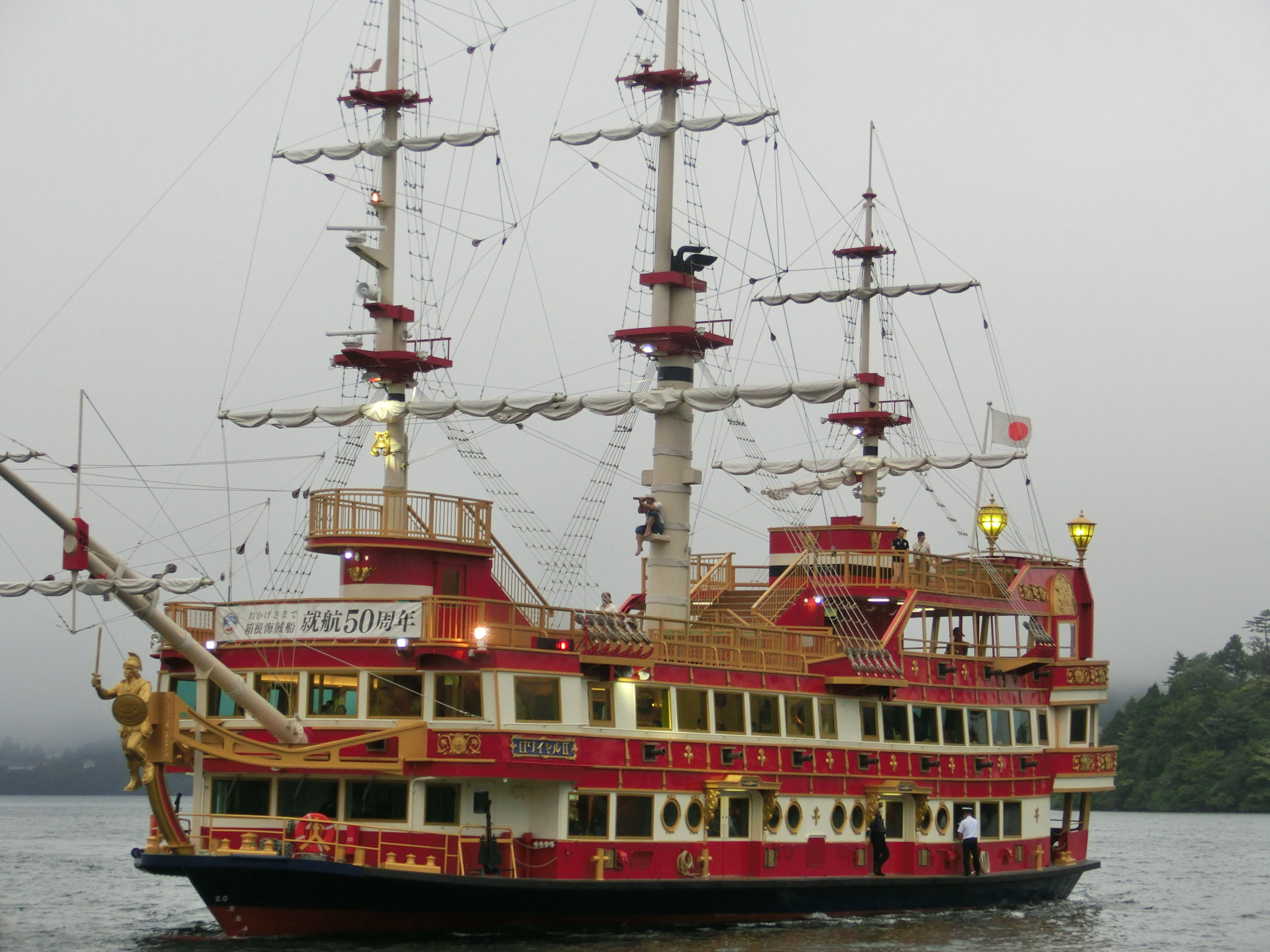
Hakone Sightseeing Cruise vessel, themed to resemble a pirate ship on Lake Ashi

The Hakone Sightseeing Cruise, operated by the Odakyu Hakone Company, runs counterclockwise on the lake, serving Togendai Station, Moto-Hakone Port, and Hakone-Machi Port before returning to Togendai. The service began in 1950. Vessels are themed to resemble pirate ships.

At Togendai, passengers can transfer to the Hakone Ropeway, an aerial tram operated by Odakyu Hakone, which connects to Sōunzan. From there, the Hakone Tozan Cable Car, a funicular railway links to the Hakone Tozan Line, a mountain railway for travel to Odawara, with onward connections to Tokyo via the Tōkaidō Shinkansen.

Odakyu Hakone also operates bus routes serving Moto-hakone and Hakone-machi.

Three vessels are operated on the route: Lake Ashi Queen, Royale II, and Victory. Each can carry at least 500 passengers.

The vessels take 25 minutes to cross the lake between Tōgendai on the north shore and either Hakone-machi or Moto-hakone on the south shore. The trip from Hakone-machi to Moto-hakone takes 10 minutes. An entire loop around the lake takes about 90 minutes.

=== Ports ===
No.	Port	Transfers
OH65	Tōgendai	Hakone Ropeway
OH66	Hakone-machi	
OH67	Moto-hakone	

== Gallery ==
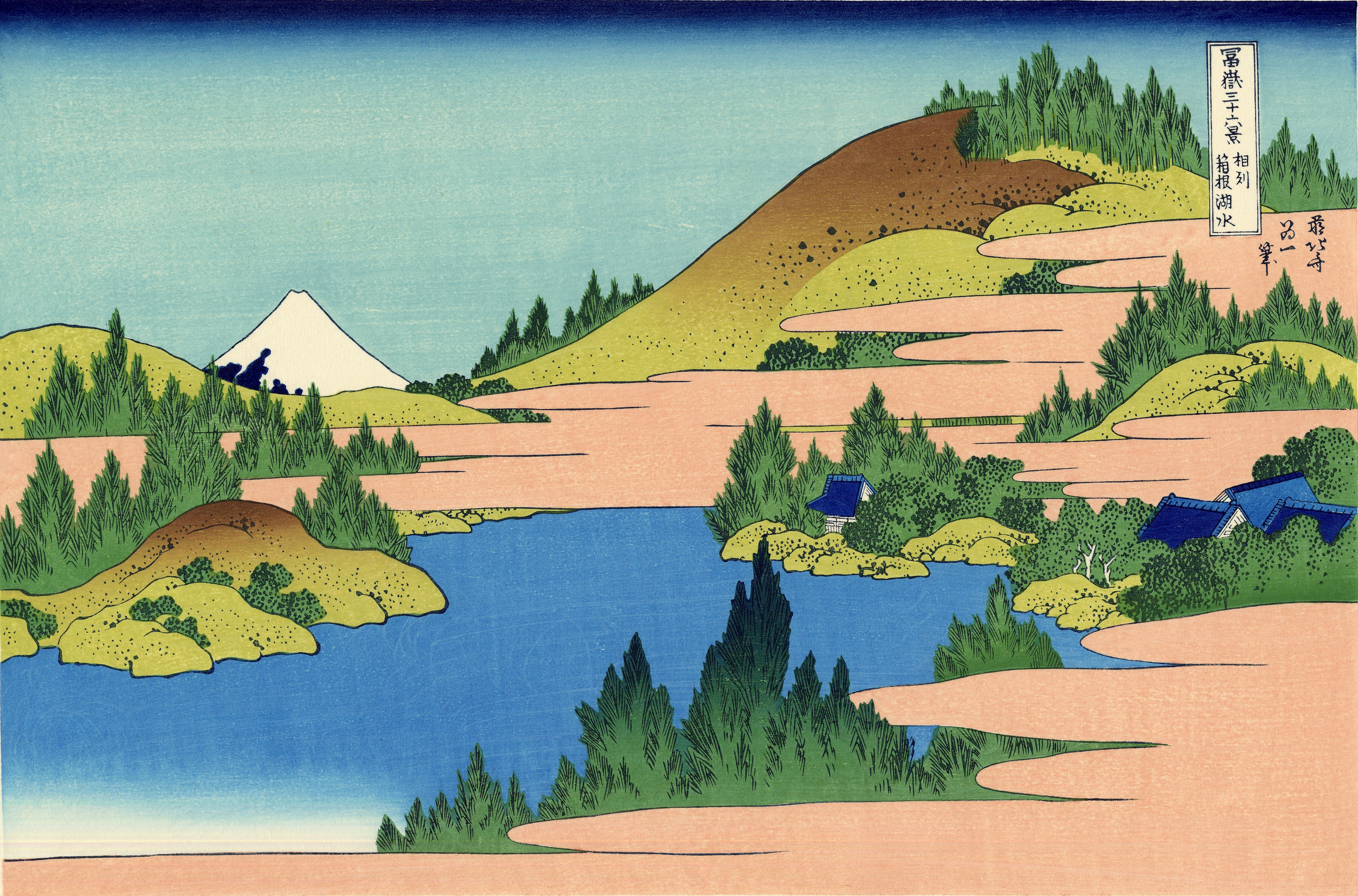
Hokusai

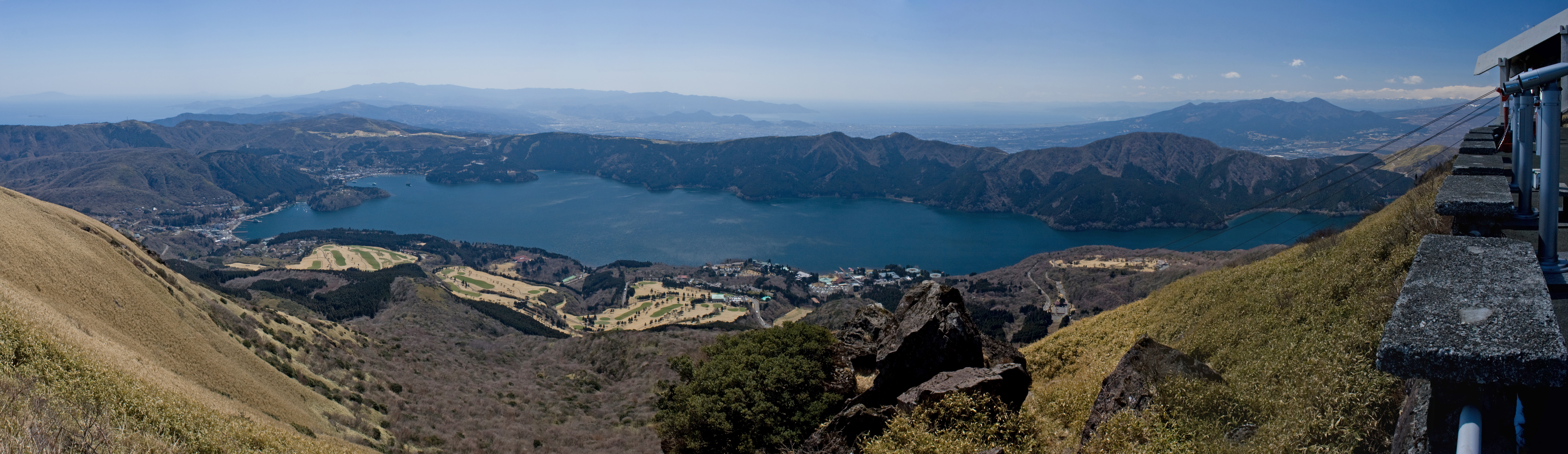
Lake Ashi from Mount Komagatake

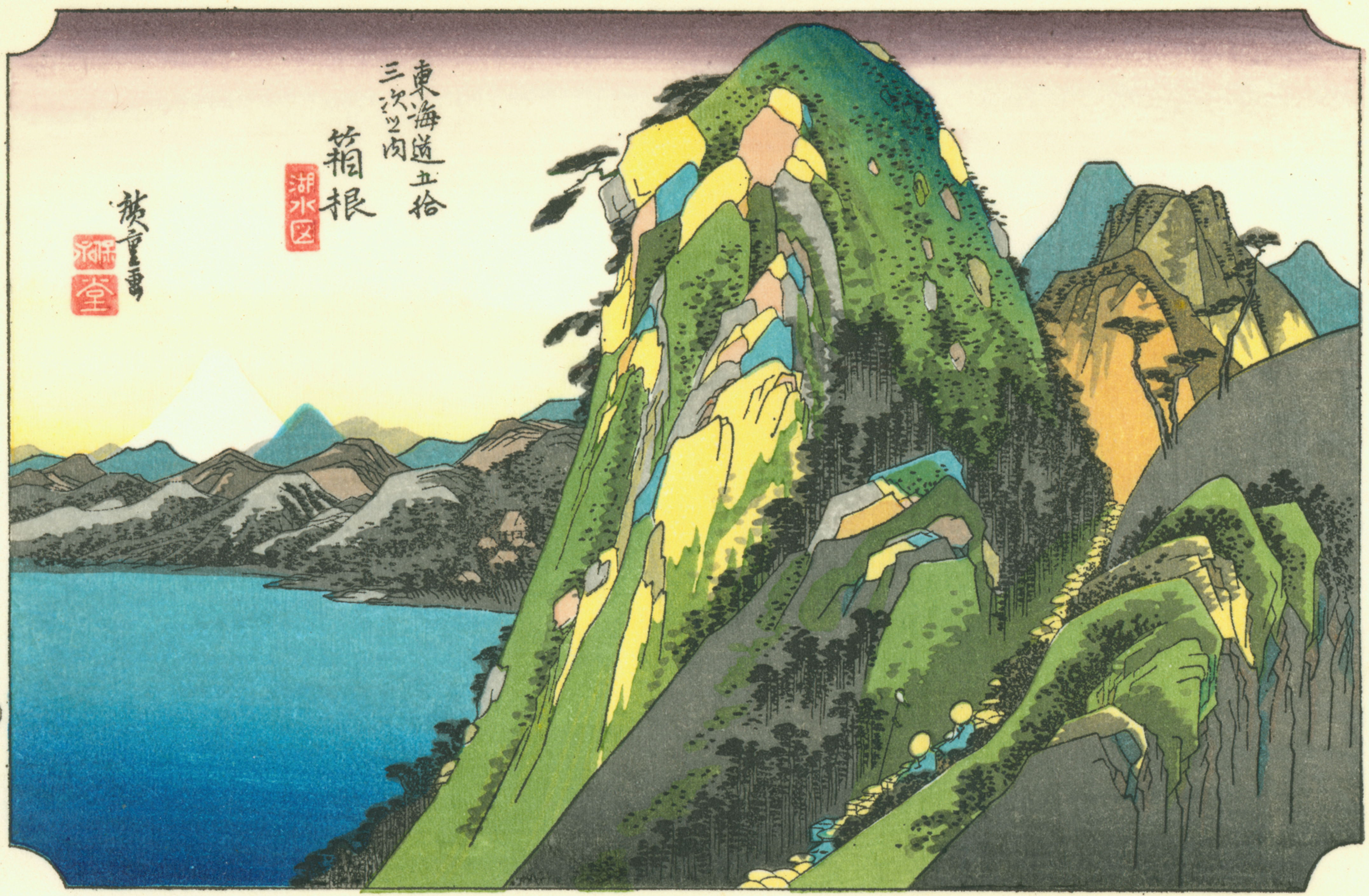
Hiroshige
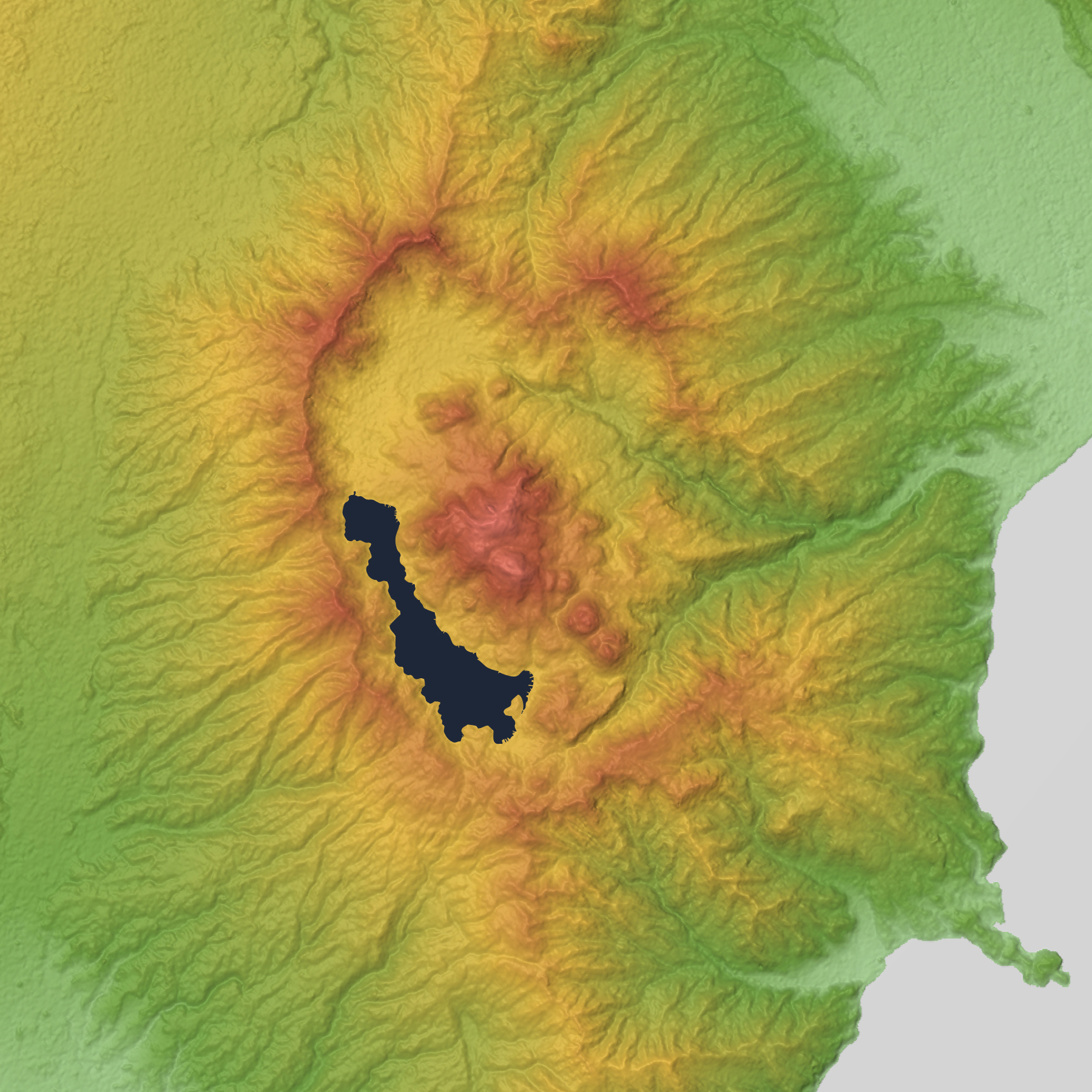
Hakone volcano

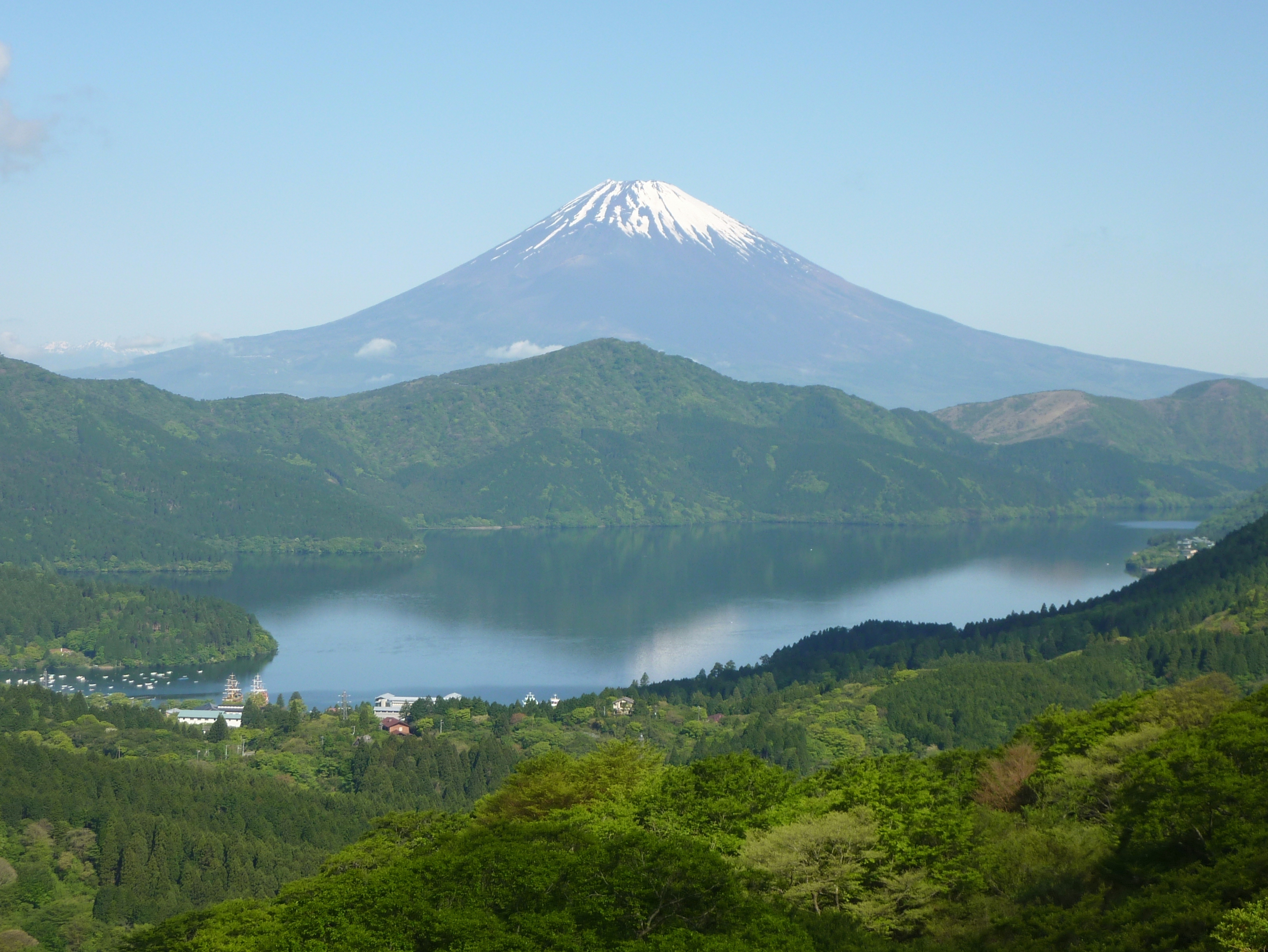
With Mount Fuji

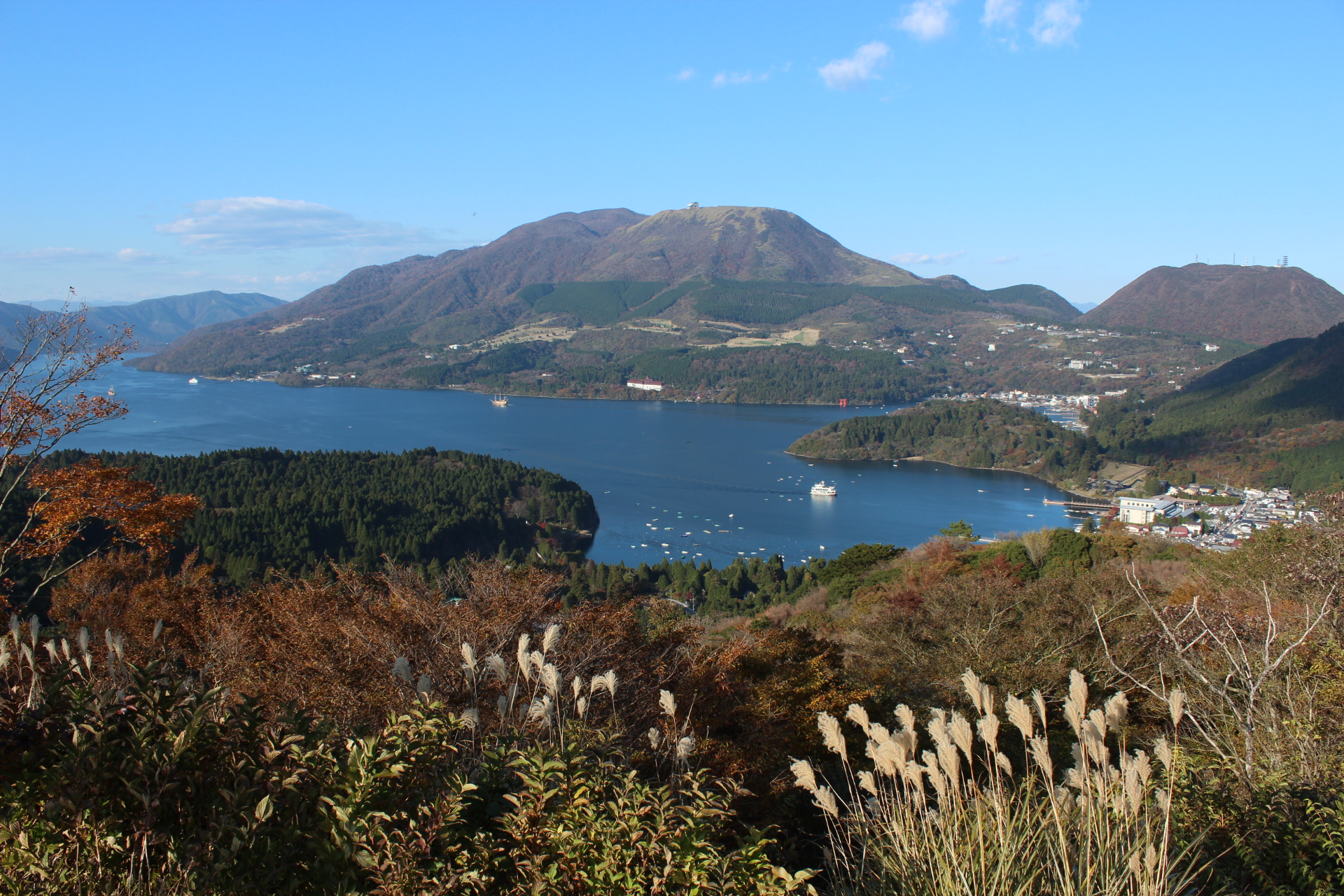
Viewed from the South

Several scenes, 2025
