= Ashigarashimo District =

District in Kanagawa prefecture, Japan

Coordinates: 35°12′38″N 139°03′16″E

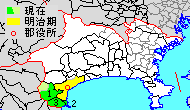
Map of Ashigarashimo District with Meiji period area in yellow, modern area in green 1 - Hakone, 2 - Manazuru, 3 - Yugawara

Ashigarashimo District (足柄下郡, Ashigarashimo-gun) is a district of Japan located in western Kanagawa Prefecture, Japan. Most sparsely populated mountainous districts are part of the Fuji-Hakone-Izu National Park. The majority area of the city of Odawara was formerly part of Ashigarashimo District.

As of 2009, the district had an estimated population of 48,713 and a density of 346 persons per km^{2}. The total area was 140.73 km^{2}.

== Towns and villages ==
- Hakone
- Manazuru
- Yugawara

== History ==
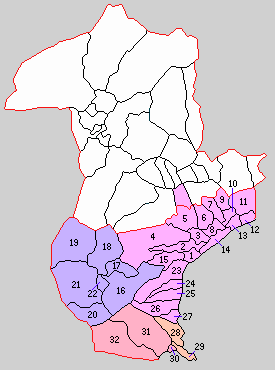
Historic Map of Ashigaramshimo District

Ashigarashimo District was one of the ancient subdivisions of Sagami Province, per the Nara period Ritsuryō system, under the name Ashinoshimo District (足下郡, Ashinoshimo-gun). The area was under the control of the later Hōjō clan in the Sengoku period, and part of Odawara Domain during the Edo period. Following disasters caused by eruptions of nearby Mount Fuji, a portion also came to be held as tenryō territory administered by the Tokugawa shogunate.

=== Timeline ===
After the Meiji Restoration, it initially formed part of the short-lived Ashigara Prefecture before it was established as a district of Kanagawa Prefecture under the cadastral reform of 1878. In 1889, it was administratively divided into two towns (Odawara and Hakone) and 30 villages. On December 20, 1940, Odawara was elevated to city status. Local voters rejected a planned merger of Yugawara into Odawara in 2005 in an August 8, 2004 referendum.

=== Merger table ===
before 1889	April 1, 1889	1889 - 1926	1926 – 1944		1945 - 1954		1955 - 1989		1989–Present	Present
	Shimonaka village	Shimonaka village	Shimonaka village		Shimonaka village		April 1, 1955; Tachibana town	April 1, 1971 merged with Odawara city	Odawara city	Odawara
	Maeha village	Maeha village	Maeha village		Maeha village		April 1, 1955; Tachibana town	April 1, 1971 merged with Odawara city	Odawara city	Odawara
	Shimofuchu village	Shimofuchu village	Shimofuchu village		April 1, 1948 merged with Odawara city		Odawara city		Odawara city	Odawara
	Kamifuchu village	Kamifuchu village	Kamifuchu village		December 1, 1954 merged with Odawara city		Odawara city		Odawara city	Odawara
	Shimosoga village	Shimosoga village	Shimosoga village		December 1, 1954 merged with Odawara city		Odawara city		Odawara city	Odawara
	Toyokawa village	Toyokawa village	Toyokawa village		July 15, 1954 merged with Odawara city		Odawara city		Odawara city	Odawara
	Tajima village	Tajima village	Tajima village		April 1, 1948 merged with Kōzu town	December 1, 1954 merged with Odawara city	Odawara city		Odawara city	Odawara
	Kōzu village	April 1, 1924; Kōzu town	Kōzu town		Kōzu town	December 1, 1954 merged with Odawara city	Odawara city		Odawara city	Odawara
	Sakawa village	Sakawa village	Sakawa village	April 1, 1942; Sakawa town	Sakawa town	December 1, 1954 merged with Odawara city	Odawara city		Odawara city	Odawara
	Sakawa village	Sakawa village	Sakawa village	December 20, 1940; Odawara city (Amiisshiki・Sannohara area)	Odawara city		Odawara city		Odawara city	Odawara
	Odawara town	Odawara town	Odawara town	December 20, 1940; Odawara city	Odawara city		Odawara city		Odawara city	Odawara
	Ashiko village	April 1, 1908; Ashigara village	February 11, 1940; Ashigara town	December 20, 1940; Odawara city	Odawara city		Odawara city		Odawara city	Odawara
	Futakawa village	April 1, 1908; Ashigara village	February 11, 1940; Ashigara town	December 20, 1940; Odawara city	Odawara city		Odawara city		Odawara city	Odawara
	Kuno village	April 1, 1908; Ashigara village	February 11, 1940; Ashigara town	December 20, 1940; Odawara city	Odawara city		Odawara city		Odawara city	Odawara
	Tomizu village	April 1, 1908; Ashigara village	February 11, 1940; Ashigara town	December 20, 1940; Odawara city	Odawara city		Odawara city		Odawara city	Odawara
	Ōkubo village	Ōkubo village	Ōkubo village	December 20, 1940; Odawara city	Odawara city		Odawara city		Odawara city	Odawara
	Hayakawa village	Hayakawa village	Hayakawa village	December 20, 1940; Odawara city	Odawara city		Odawara city		Odawara city	Odawara
	Ishibashi village	April 1, 1913; Kataura village	Kataura village		December 1, 1954 merged with Odawara city		Odawara city		Odawara city	Odawara
	Yonegami village	April 1, 1913; Kataura village	Kataura village		December 1, 1954 merged with Odawara city		Odawara city		Odawara city	Odawara
	Nebukawa village	April 1, 1913; Kataura village	Kataura village		December 1, 1954 merged with Odawara city		Odawara city		Odawara city	Odawara
	Enoura village	April 1, 1913; Kataura village	Kataura village		December 1, 1954 merged with Odawara city		Odawara city		Odawara city	Odawara
	Yumoto village	Yumoto village	October 1, 1927; Yumoto town		Yumoto town		September 30, 1956; Hakone town		Hakone town	Hakone
	Onsen village	Onsen village	Onsen village		Onsen village		September 30, 1956; Hakone town		Hakone town	Hakone
	Miyagino village	Miyagino village	Miyagino village		Miyagino village		September 30, 1956; Hakone town		Hakone town	Hakone
	Sengokubara village	Sengokubara village	Sengokubara village		Sengokubara village		September 30, 1956; Hakone town		Hakone town	Hakone
	Hakone town	Hakone town	Hakone town		January 1, 1954; Hakone town		September 30, 1956; Hakone town		Hakone town	Hakone
	Motohakone village	Motohakone village	Motohakone village		January 1, 1954; Hakone town		September 30, 1956; Hakone town		Hakone town	Hakone
	Ashinoyu village	Ashinoyu village	Ashinoyu village		January 1, 1954; Hakone town		September 30, 1956; Hakone town		Hakone town	Hakone
	Manazuru village	Manazuru village	October 1, 1927; Manazuru town		Manazuru town		September 30, 1956; Manazuru town		Manazuru village	Manazuru
	Iwa village	Iwa village	Iwa village		Iwa village		September 30, 1956; Manazuru town		Manazuru village	Manazuru
	Doi village	July 1, 1926; Yugawara town	Yugawara town		Yugawara town		April 1, 1955; Yugawara town		Yugawara town	Yugawara
	Yoshihama village	Yoshihama village	April 1, 1940; Yoshihama town		Yoshihama town		April 1, 1955; Yugawara town		Yugawara town	Yugawara
	Fukuura village	Fukuura village	Fukuura village		Fukuura village		April 1, 1955; Yugawara town		Yugawara town	Yugawara
