= Odakyu Group =

- Company type: Public
- Traded as: TYO: 9007; Nikkei 225 component
- Industry: Transport; Real estate; Retail
- Founded: June 1, 1948; 78 years ago
- Headquarters: 2-2 Megumi-cho, Ebina, Kanagawa; 1-8-3 Nishi-Shinjuku, Shinjuku, Tokyo
- Key people: Koji Hoshino (Board chairman & representative director); Shigeru Suzuki (President & CEO)
- Revenue: ▲¥422.7 billion (JFY24)
- Operating income: ▲¥51.4 billion (JFY24)
- Net income: ▼¥52 billion (JFY24)
- Number of employees: 3,721 (JFY24)
- Subsidiaries: Odakyu Electric Railway; Enoshima Electric Railway; Odakyu Hakone
- Website: www.odakyu.jp

The Odakyu Group (Japanese: 小田急グループ, Hepburn: Odakyū gurūpu) is a group of companies centered around the Odakyu Electric Railway company based in Shinjuku, Tokyo, Japan. The group originated as a rail transport operator, but has since diversified its operations to include real estate, retail, B2B, finance (credit card), fiber optic networking, personal storage, travel sales, and bus services. It also owns several recreational facilities, including a golf course, campground, hot springs resort, and sailing resort, all of which are situated to bring more passengers onto the core business, the railway network. As of 2025, the group comprises 67 companies. All are separate companies and retain their own branding and logos, albeit with coordination among group companies and cross ownership. Not all member companies use the name Odakyu, though many do.

== Transport ==
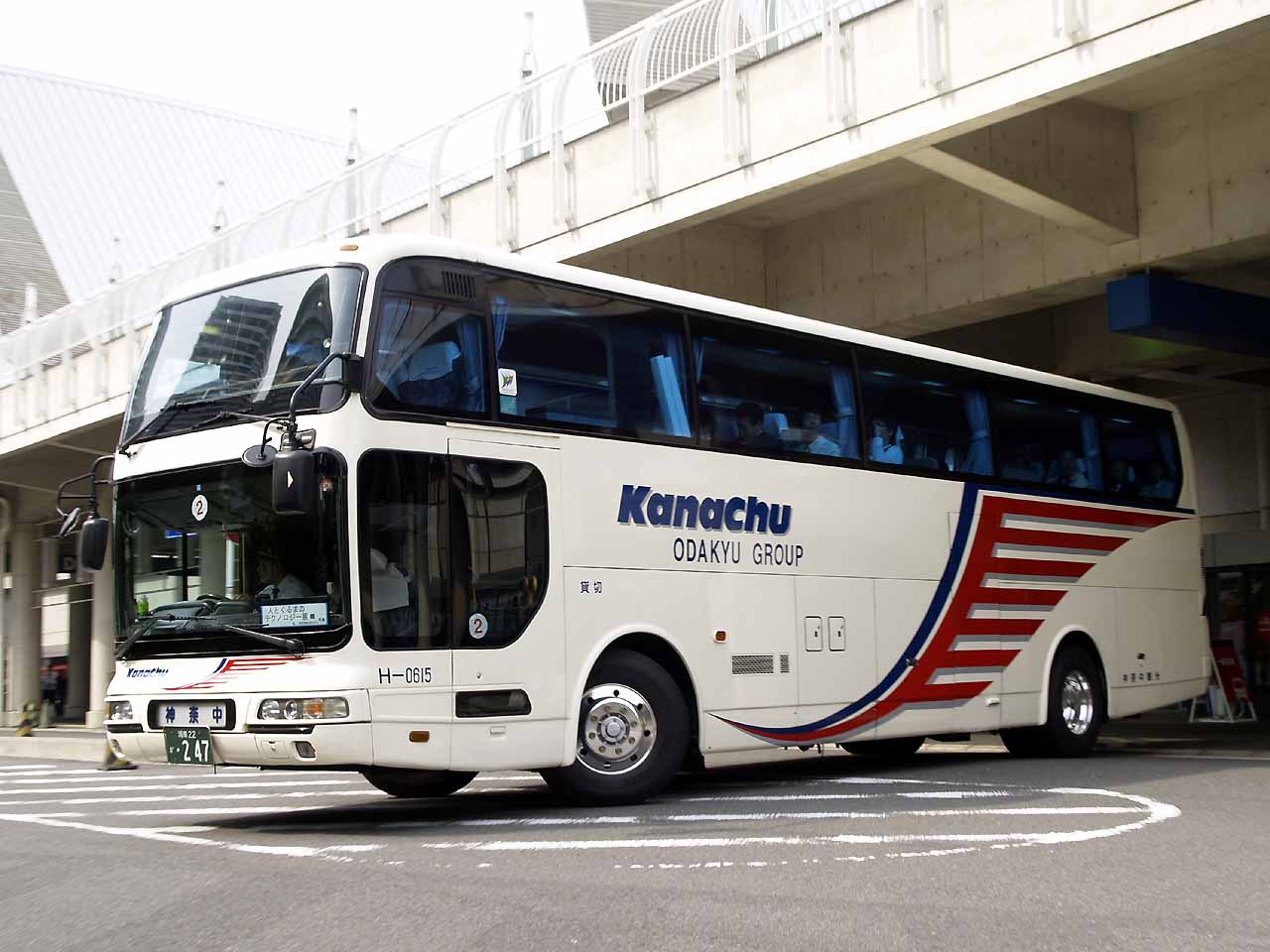
Kanachu Odakyu Bus

The railway network of the group includes the three lines of the Odakyu Electric Railway, the Enoshima Electric Railway, and the Hakone Tozan Railway companies. It operates the Hakone Ropeway. Odakyu, like many railway companies in Japan, also operates an extensive set of feeder buses all throughout the line that complement city bus services, as well as limited long distance bus services. They include 16 brands, major ones are Kanachu Bus (Kanagawa Chuo Kotsu, 神奈中バス・神奈川中央交通), Odakyu Bus (小田急バス), Tachikawa Bus (立川バス), Enoden Bus (江ノ電バス), Odakyu Hakone Highway Bus (小田急箱根高速バス), Hakone Tozan Bus (箱根登山バス), Tokai Bus(東海バス). serving Tokyo (Tama), Kanagawa, Hakone/Mount Fuji and Izu Peninsula areas. Other group operations include taxi and Hakone tourist boats.

== Retail ==
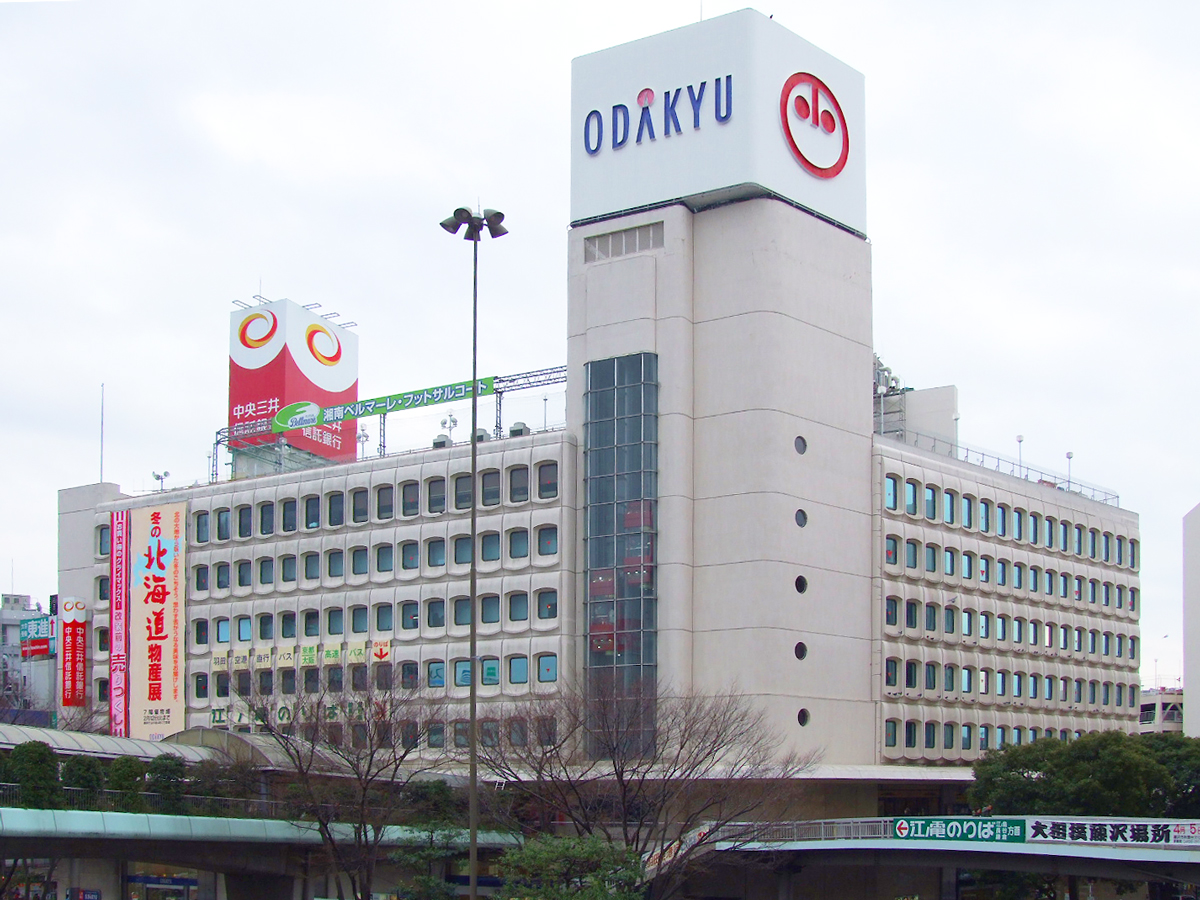
Odakyu Hyakkaten Department Store with trademark circular double dot store logo

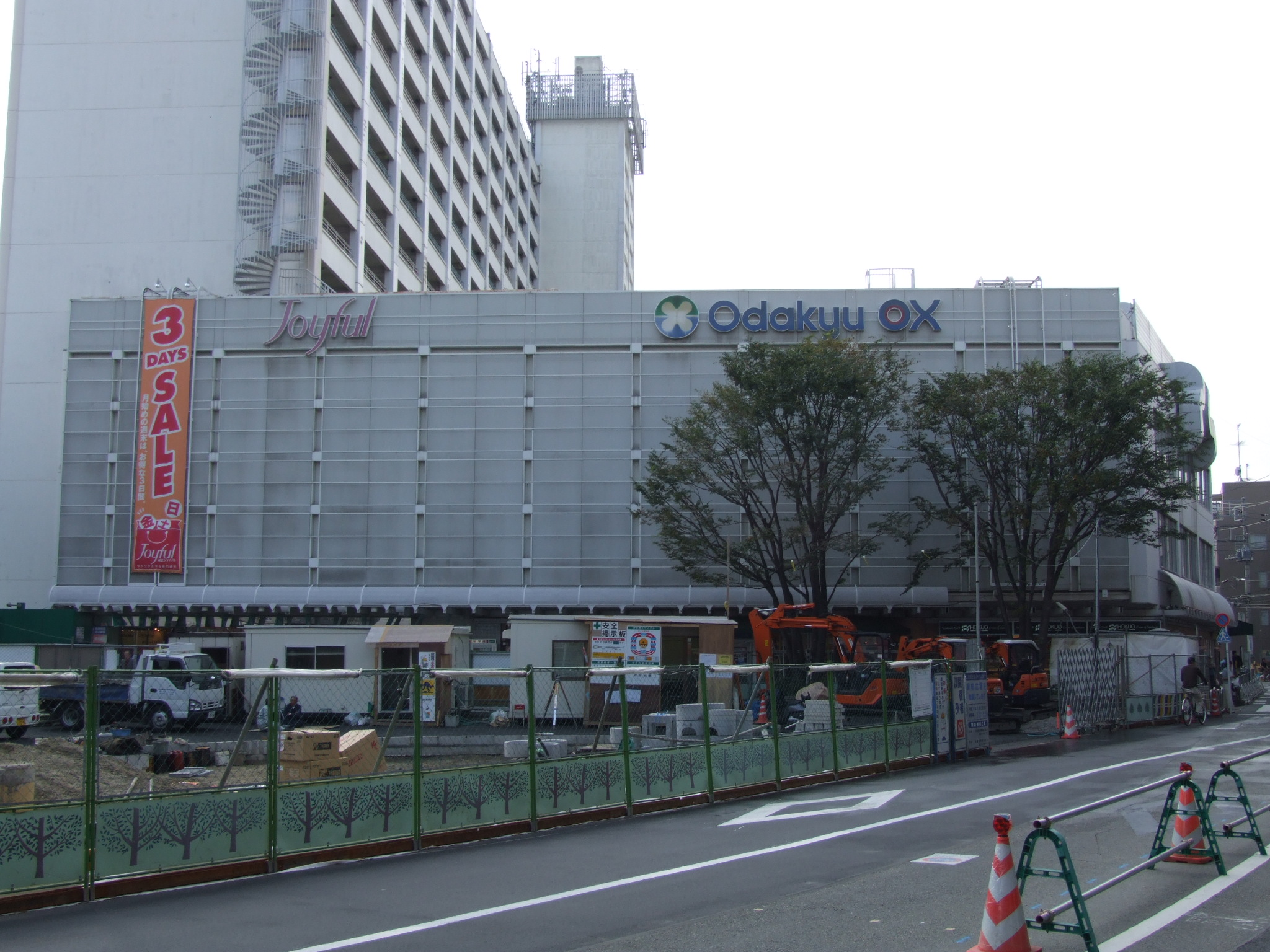
Odakyu OX supermarket

The Odakyu Group member companies runs a large variety of retail. Large department stores by Shinjuku, Machida and Fujisawa stations, called Odakyu Hyakkaten. It also runs a chain of supermarkets called Odakyu OX across west Tokyo and Kanagawa Prefecture, as well as a chain of convenience stores (Odakyu Mart) and kiosk outlets (OX Shop) found in various Odakyu line stations, of which maintain the OX brand logos. The group member companies even consist of other areas such as affiliated florists and auto dealerships.

== Hospitality and Real Estate ==
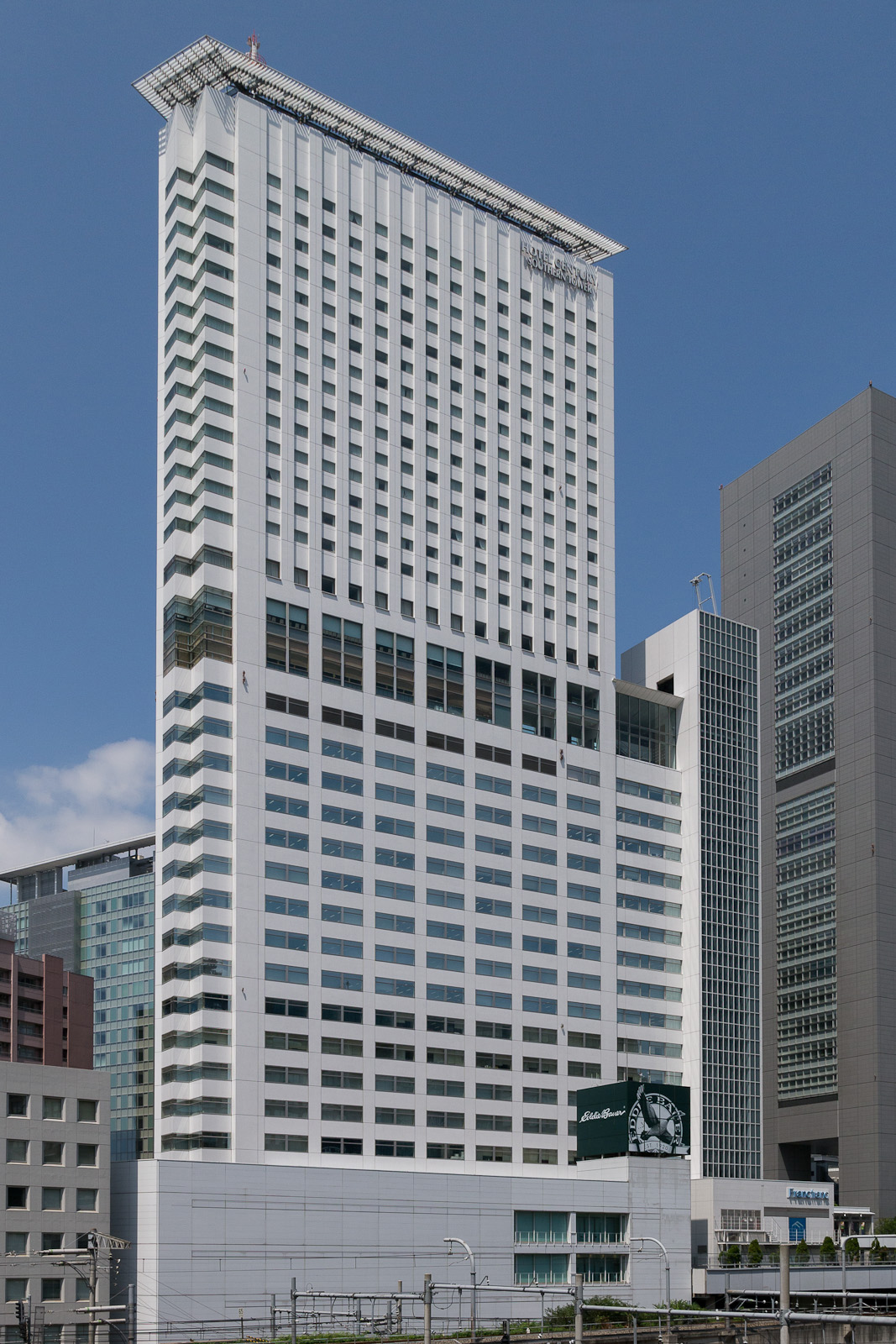
Odakyu Southern Tower

Odakyu Group includes hotels, resorts (Odakyu Resorts 小田急リゾーツ), travel agencies, outlet malls, golf courses, and restaurants, common among large railway companies in Japan, and even residential apartment blocks. Odakyu also runs a number of large hotels, including Odakyu Southern Tower in Yoyogi, as well as others in Shinjuku and Izu Peninsula.

== B2B services ==
Odakyu Engineering provides engineering services to other corporations and partners.

== TSE listing ==
Along with Odakyu Electric Railway, Kanagawa Central Transport Kanachu Bus (神奈川中央交通株式会社) is listed on Section 1 of the Tokyo Stock Exchange. OER (Odakyu Electric Railway) is listed on Section 1 of Tokyo Stock Exchange, and is a company on Fortune magazine's Global 500 list.
