= Ōwakudani Station =

Cable car station in Hakone, Kanagawa Prefecture, Japan

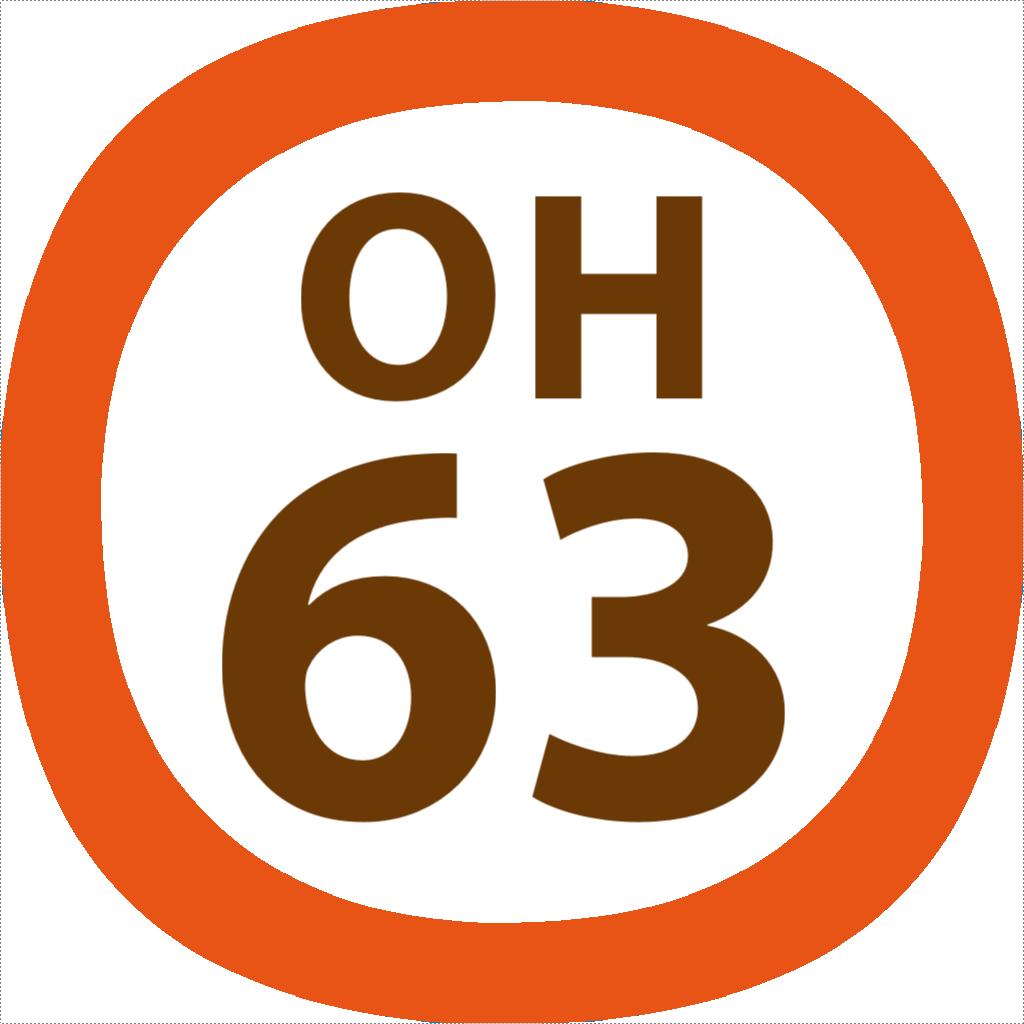
Ōwakudani Station 大涌谷駅

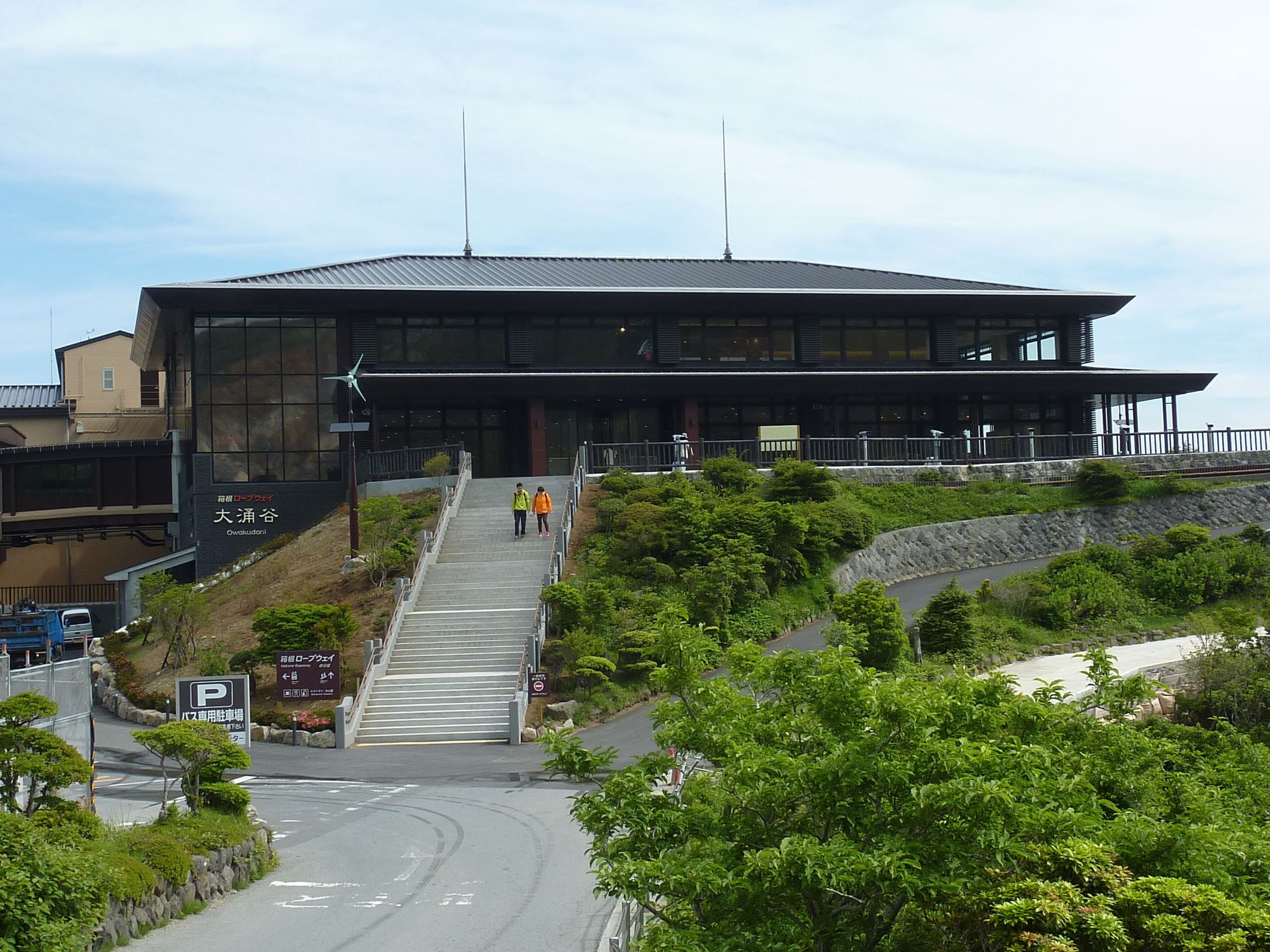
- Ōwakudani Station

General information
- Location: 1251 Sengokuhara, Hakone, Ashigarashimo, Kanagawa; Japan
- Operator: Odakyu Hakone
- Platforms: 2

History
- Opened: 1959

Services
Preceding station	Hakone Ropeway	Following station
Ubako towards Tōgendai	Hakone Ropeway	Sōunzan Terminus
Location

Ōwakudani Station (Japanese: 大涌谷駅, Hepburn: Ōwakudani-eki) is a station on the Hakone Ropeway in the town of Hakone, Kanagawa, Japan. It is 1.5 kilometers (0.93 mi) from the Hakone Ropeway's terminus at Sōunzan Station, 2.5 kilometers (1.6 mi) from the Hakone Ropeway's opposing terminus at Tōgendai Station. It is located at an altitude of 1,044 meters (3,425 ft) in the Ōwakudani area of Hakone.

== Lines ==
Ōwakudani Station is served by the Hakone Ropeway.

== Layout ==
The boarding area is separated for Sōunzan direction and Tōgendai direction, with access by stairs or escalator, as the station is built barrier free for use by handicapped passengers.

== History ==
Ōwakudani Station opened on December 5, 1959 with the opening of the Hakone Ropeway Line.

== In popular culture ==
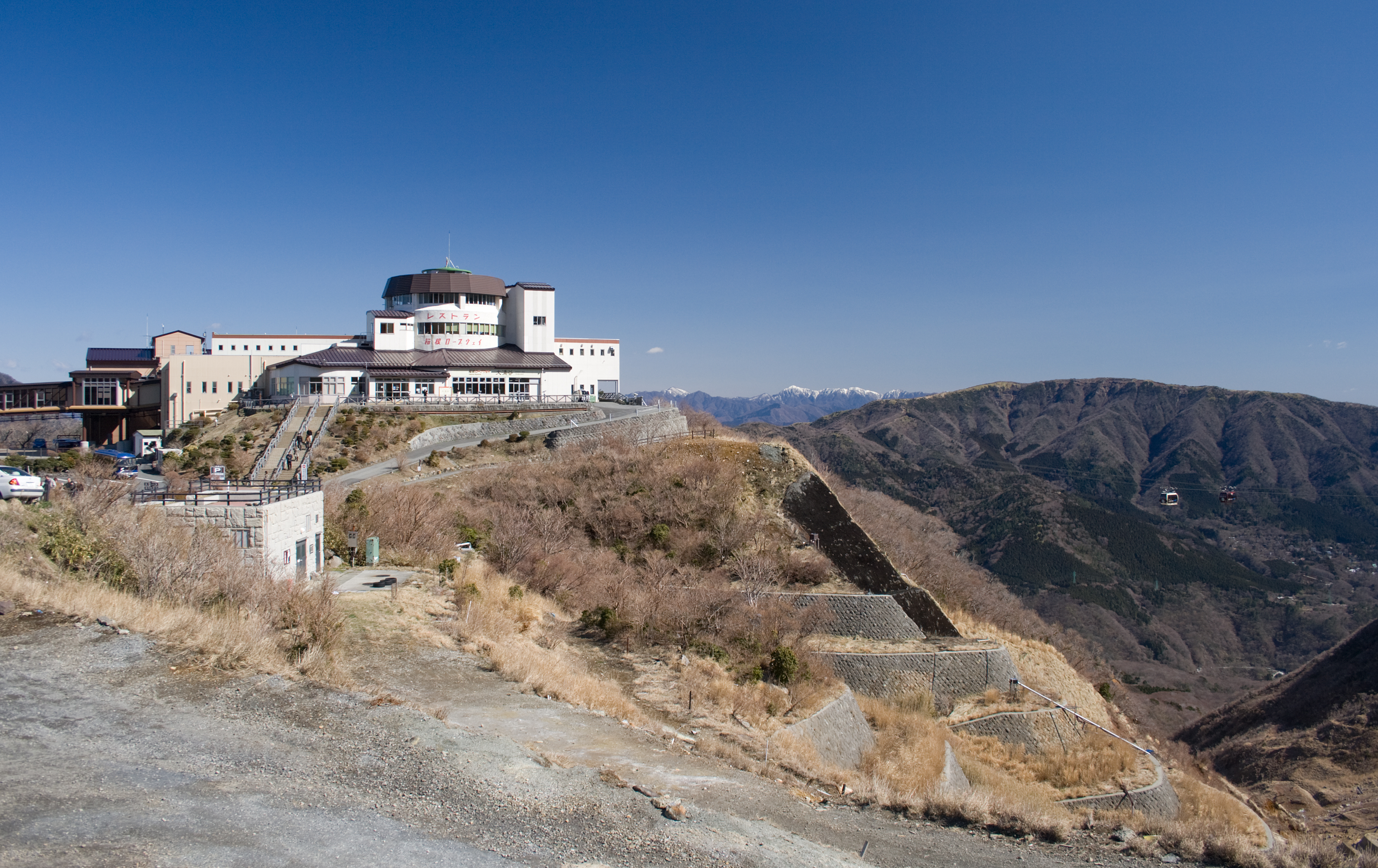
Ōwakudani Station pictured in 2008, as seen in Godzilla, Mothra and King Ghidorah: Giant Monsters All-Out Attack.

Ōwakudani Station was used as a location in the 2001 Japanese film Godzilla, Mothra and King Ghidorah: Giant Monsters All-Out Attack. In the scene, the monsters Godzilla and Baragon fight, resulting in the destruction of the building.

== Bus services ==
Izuhakone Bus 大涌谷 (Ōwakudani) Bus Stop 35.243341°N 139.019476°E

- "J" line for Hakone-en (Lake Ashi) via Kojiri
- "J" line for Odawara Station via Kowaki-en, Kowakidani Station, Miyanoshita, Hakone-Yumoto Station

== See also ==
- Ōwakudani
