= Ōwakudani =

Hot springs valley in Hakone, Japan

Coordinates: 35°14′31″N 139°01′14″E

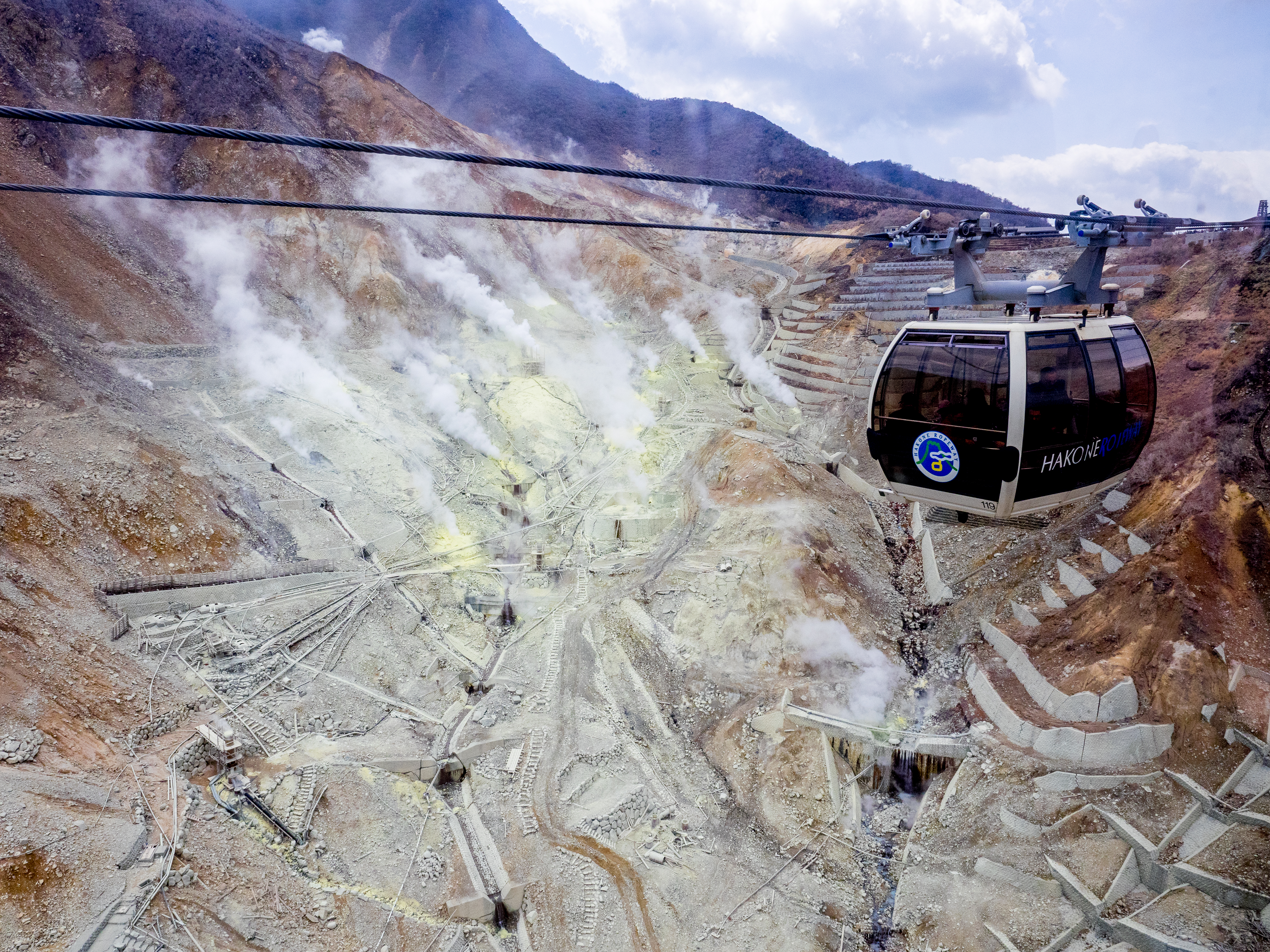
Ōwakudani as seen from the Hakone Ropeway

Ōwakudani in 2017

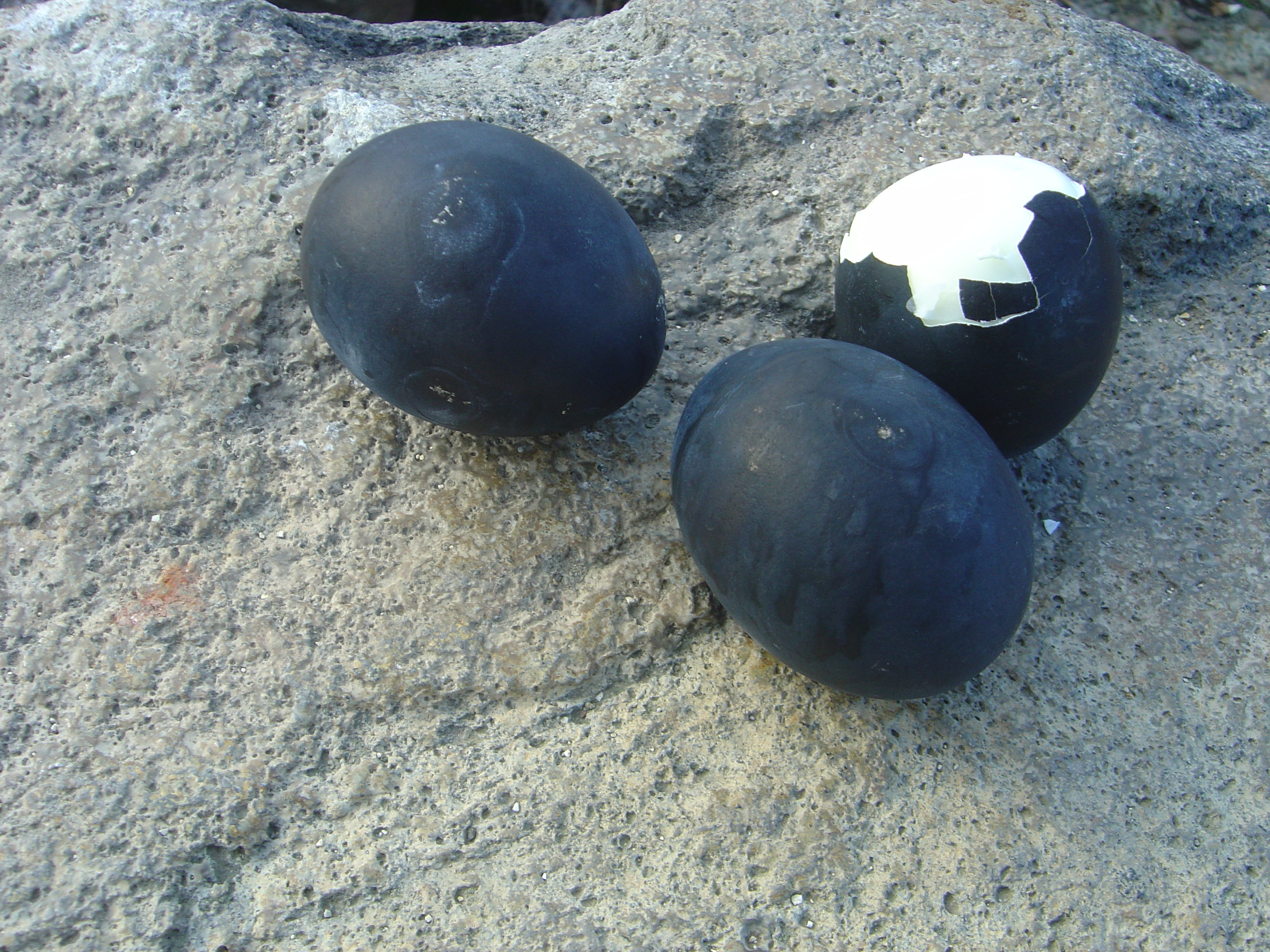
Kuro-tamago hard-boiled eggs

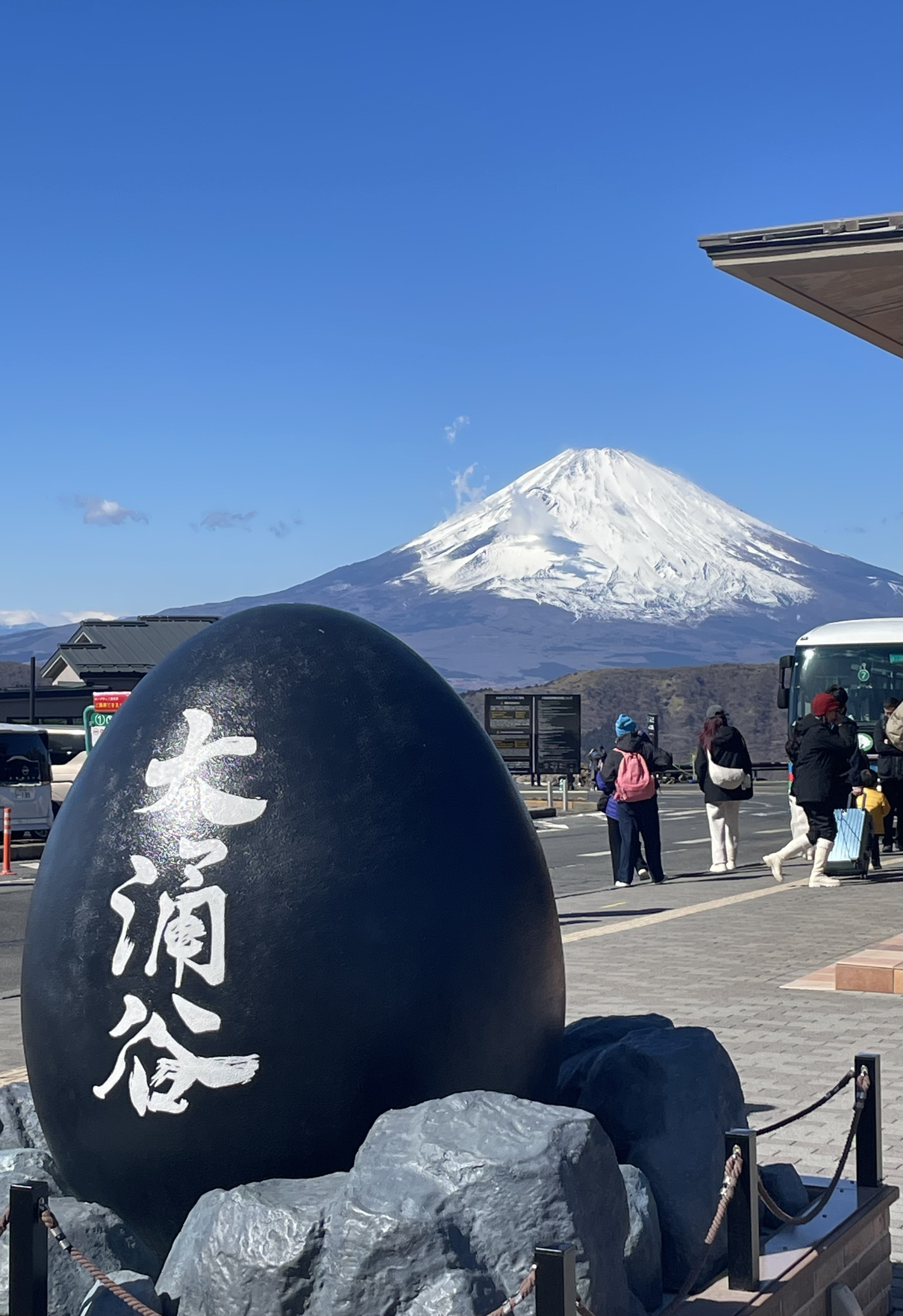
Owakudani sculpture

Ōwakudani (大涌谷, lit. "Great Boiling Valley") is a volcanic valley with active sulphur vents and hot springs in Hakone, Kanagawa Prefecture, Japan. It was created around 3,000 years ago, as a result of the explosion of the Hakone volcano.

It is a popular tourist site for its scenic views, volcanic activity, and kuro-tamago (黒卵, lit. "black egg") — a local variety of hard-boiled eggs that uses the hot springs in their preparation. As a result of them being boiled in the mineral-rich waters of the valley, which contain high levels of sulfur, the egg shells turn black and give off a slightly sulfuric odour; eating one is said to add seven years to your life.

Upon seeing the hellish scenery, when Kōbō Daishi visited Owakudani more than a thousand years ago, he offered prayer to Bodhisattva. The Enmei-jizō in Owakudani is said to have its origin in the prayer.

== Access ==
Access to Ōwakudani is via a funitel, the Hakone Ropeway (Ōwakudani Station), or a bus line from Odawara Station, Hakone-Yumoto Station, Kowakidani Station / Kojiri, the Izuhakone Bus (Ōwakudani Bus Stop). There is a road to a visitor center just below the Kuro-tamago hot springs site.

Most visitors used to hike the roughly 1 km (0.62 mi) trail (which has been closed since 2015 due to increased volcanic activity) or take the Hakone Ropeway to close to where the eggs are boiled to participate in the ritual egg eating. The funitel offers a vast view of Mount Fuji (on clear days) and the sulphur vents just below the visitor center.

Present day activities surrounding sulphur vents are the result of massive land slides in the past. Construction of concrete barriers and stabilization of the area have been under way for decades.

== Closure ==
The tourist site in Ōwakudani was closed in May 2015 due to volcanic activity. It re-opened on April 27, 2016, but not fully, as it is not possible to walk close to the steaming vents due to the hazards involved. People with asthma, bronchitis, heart disease, heart pacemakers, and pregnant women are advised not to enter the valley because of high volcanic activity.

== In popular culture ==
Ōwakudani is featured in the anime Neon Genesis Evangelion and its manga adaptation. In the anime, the protagonist Shinji ends up near Ōwakudani after running from Misato's apartment.
