= Hakone Ropeway =

Ropeway in Japan

Coordinates: 35°14′39.7″N 139°1′8.8″E

- 箱根ロープウェイ
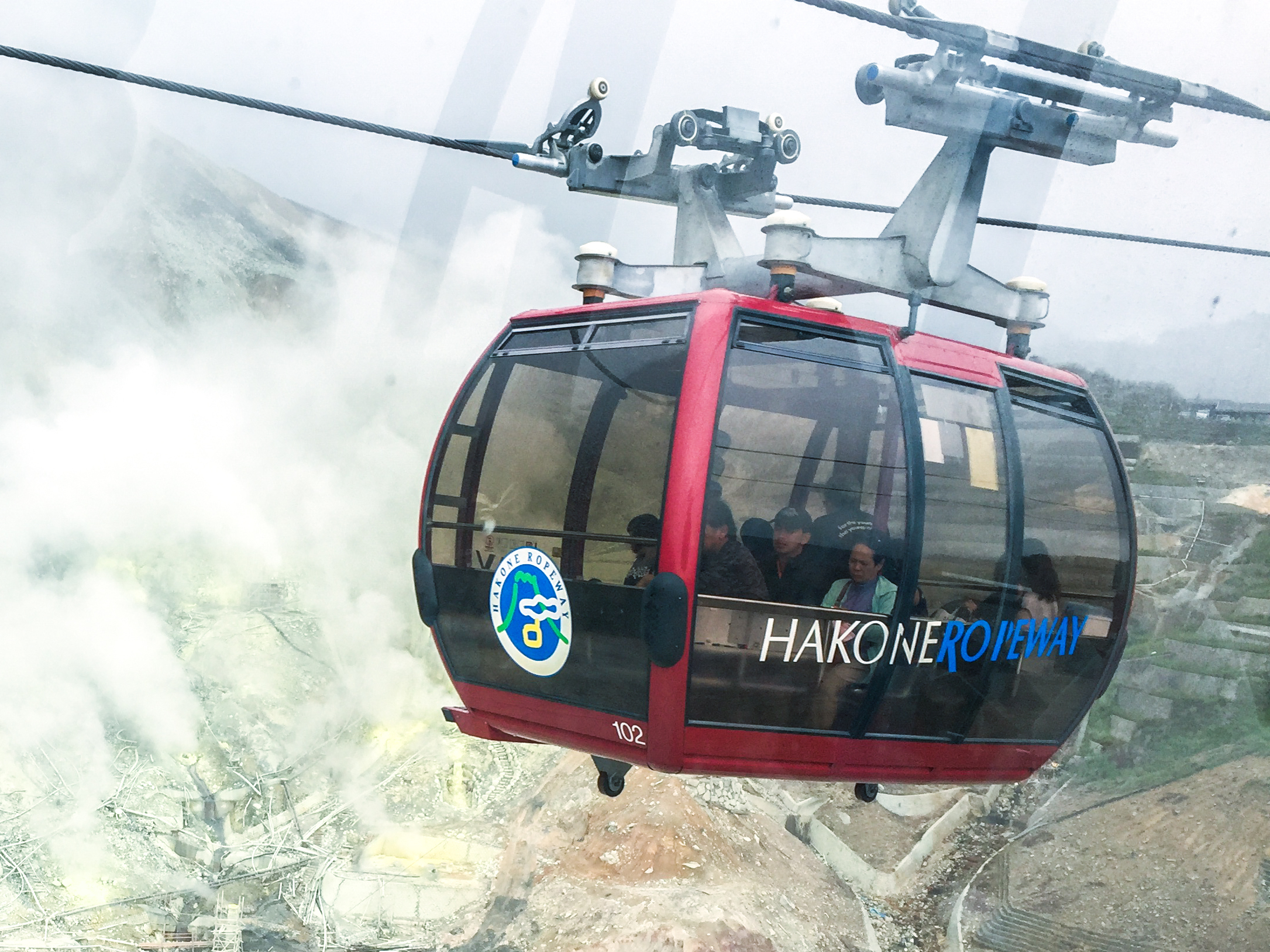
- Hakone Ropeway cabin

Overview
- Character: Recreational
- System: Odakyu Hakone
- Location: Hakone
- Country: Japan
- Elevation: lowest: 741 m (2,431 ft) highest: 1,044 m (3,425 ft)
- No. of stations: 4
- Services: Sōunzan–Ōwakudani; Ōwakudani–Tōgendai
- Open: December 6, 1959; 66 years ago

Operation
- Owner: Odakyu Hakone
- No. of carriers: 48
- Carrier capacity: 18 passengers

Technical features
- Aerial lift type: Funitel
- Manufactured by: CWA Constructions
- Line length: 4 km (2.5 mi)
- Operating speed: 5 m/s (18 km/h; 11 mph)
- Maximum Gradient: 25°

The Hakone Ropeway (Japanese: 箱根ロープウェイ, Hepburn: Hakone Rōpuwei) is the name of an aerial lift, as well as its operator. The funitel line links between Sōunzan and Tōgendai via Ōwakudani, all within Hakone, Kanagawa, Japan. The line became funitel in 2002, the second of its kind in the nation, after Hashikurasan Ropeway. It makes a part of the sightseeing route between Odawara and Lake Ashi. The company belongs to the Odakyū Group.

== Basic data ==
Hakone Ropeway was a single line until 2001. From 2002, it became a system consisted of two distinct sections, although they are still treated as the same line.

=== Between Sōunzan and Ōwakudani ===
- System:
  - Bicable gondola lift, until 2001
  - Funitel, from 2002
- Distance: 1.4 kilometres (0.9 mi)
- Vertical interval: 281 m (922 ft)
- Maximum gradient: 25°33′
- Operational speed: 5.0 m/s
- Passenger capacity per a cabin: 18
- Cabins: 18

=== Between Ōwakudani and Tōgendai ===
- System:
  - Bicable gondola lift, until 2006
  - Funitel, from 2007
- Distance: 2.5 kilometres (1.6 mi)
- Vertical interval: 298 m (978 ft)
- Maximum gradient: 19°42′
- Operational speed: 5.0 m/s
- Passenger capacity per a cabin: 18
- Cabins: 30

== Stations ==
All stations are located in Hakone, Kanagawa Prefecture.

No.	Station	Distance in km (mi)	Elevation in m (ft)	Transfers
OH62	Sōunzan 早雲山	0 (0)	757 (2,484)	Hakone Tozan Cable Car
OH63	Owakudani 大涌谷	1.472 (0.915)	1,044 (3,425)	
OH64	Ubako 姥子	2.737 (1.701)	878 (2,881)	
OH65	Tōgendai 桃源台	4.005 (2.489)	741 (2,431)	Hakone Sightseeing Cruise

== Gallery ==
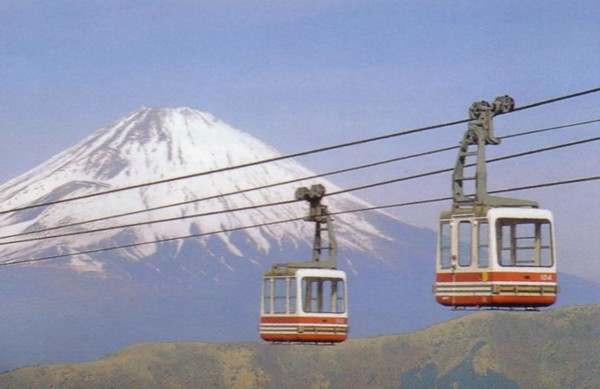
Hakone Ropeway before the refurbishment, with Mount Fuji in background

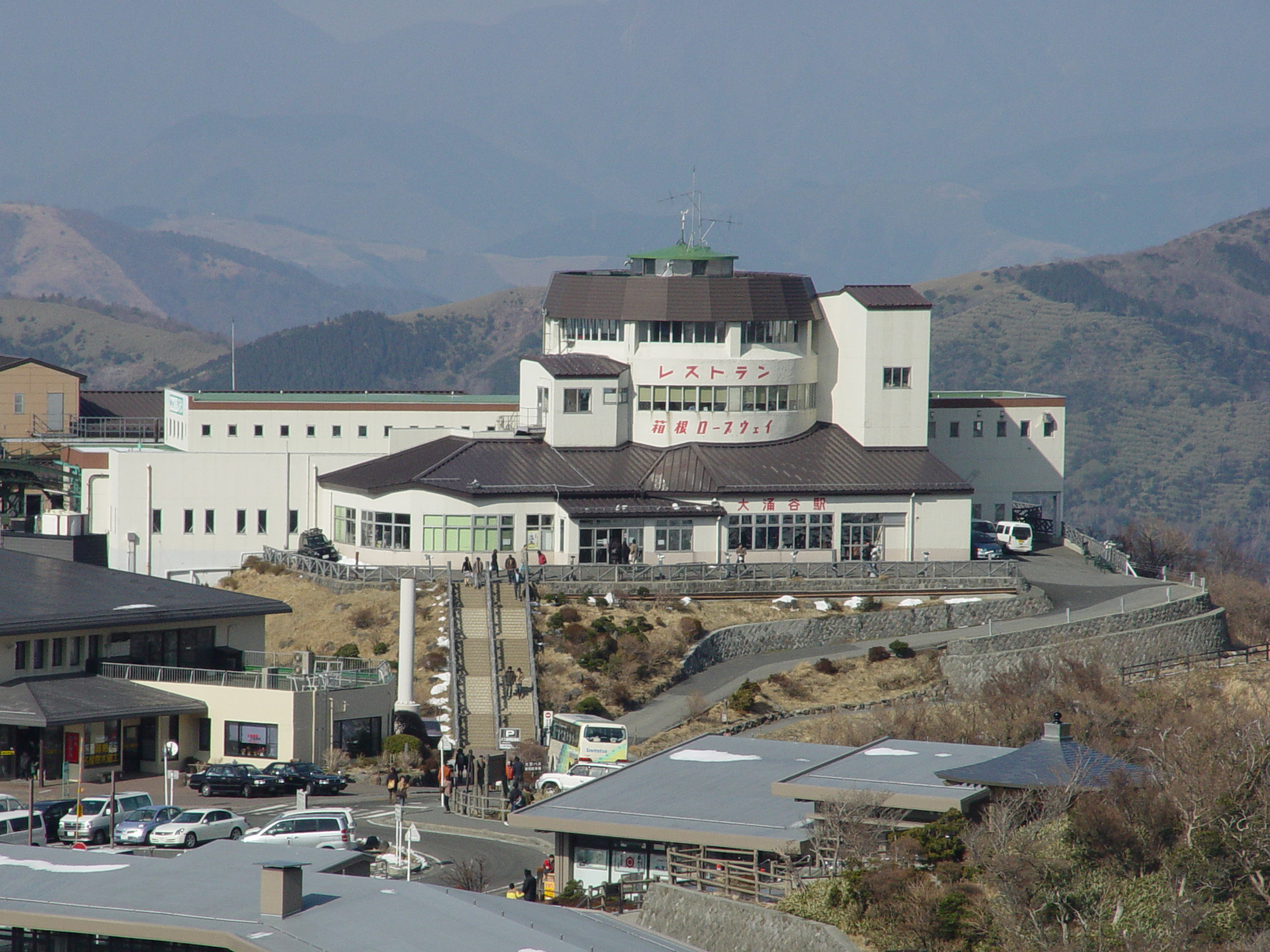
Ōwakudani station

Hakone Ropeway in 2017

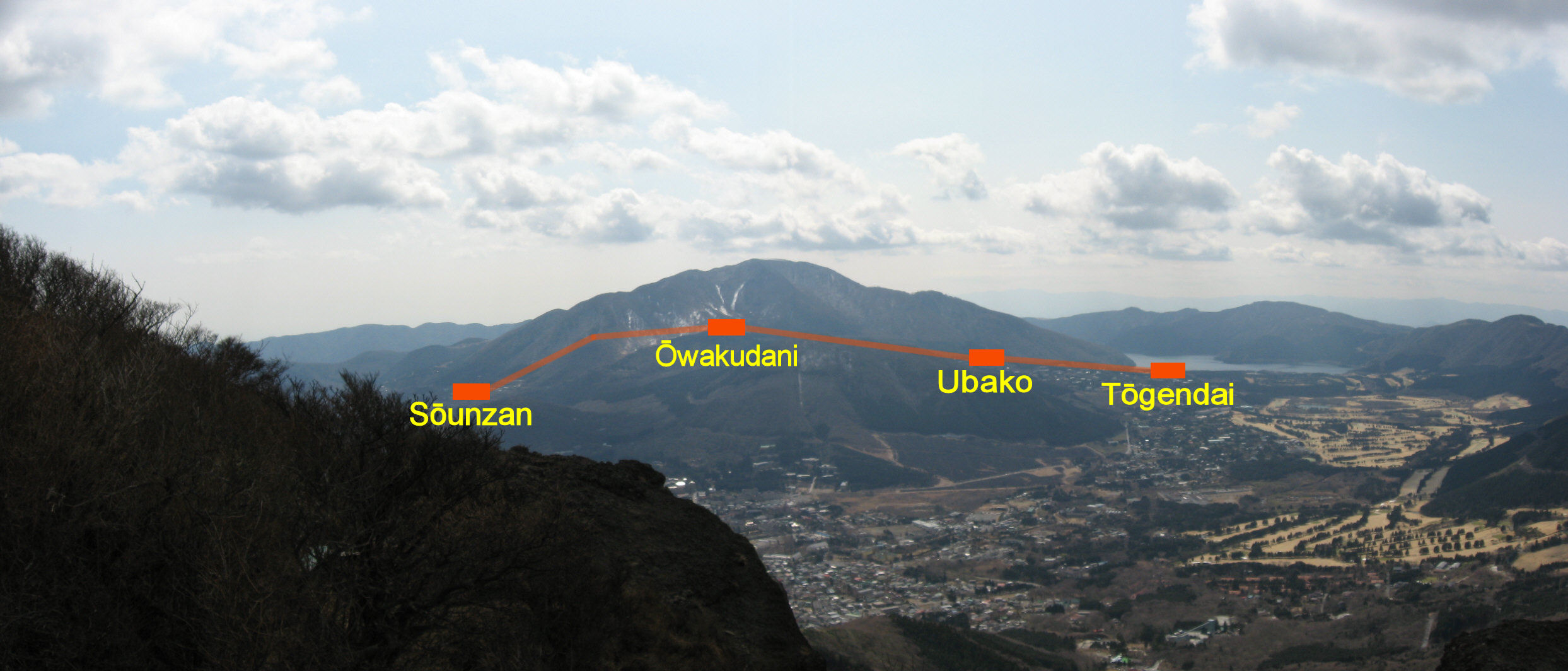
A route of Hakone Ropeway

A route of Hakone Ropeway

== See also ==
- List of aerial lifts in Japan
