= Ubako Station =

Cable car station in Hakone, Kanagawa Prefecture, Japan

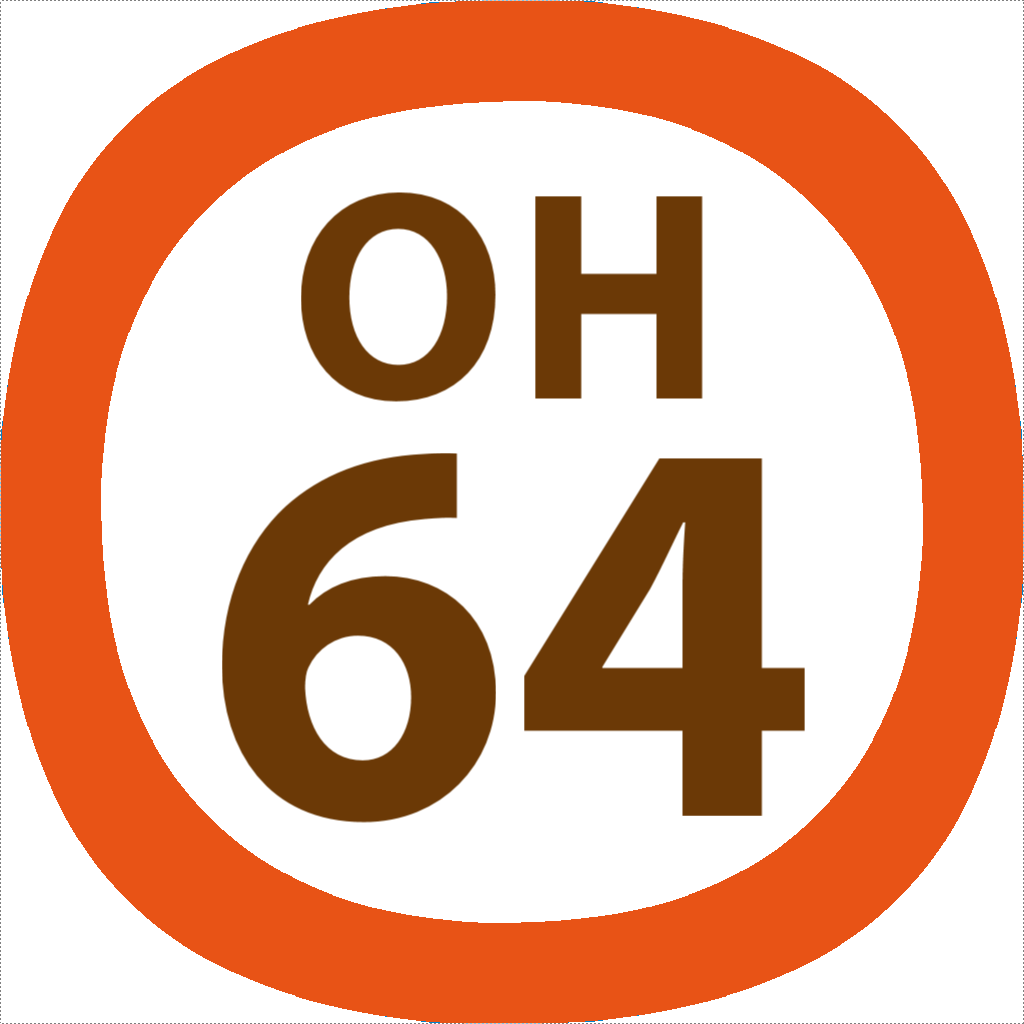
Ubako Station 姥子駅

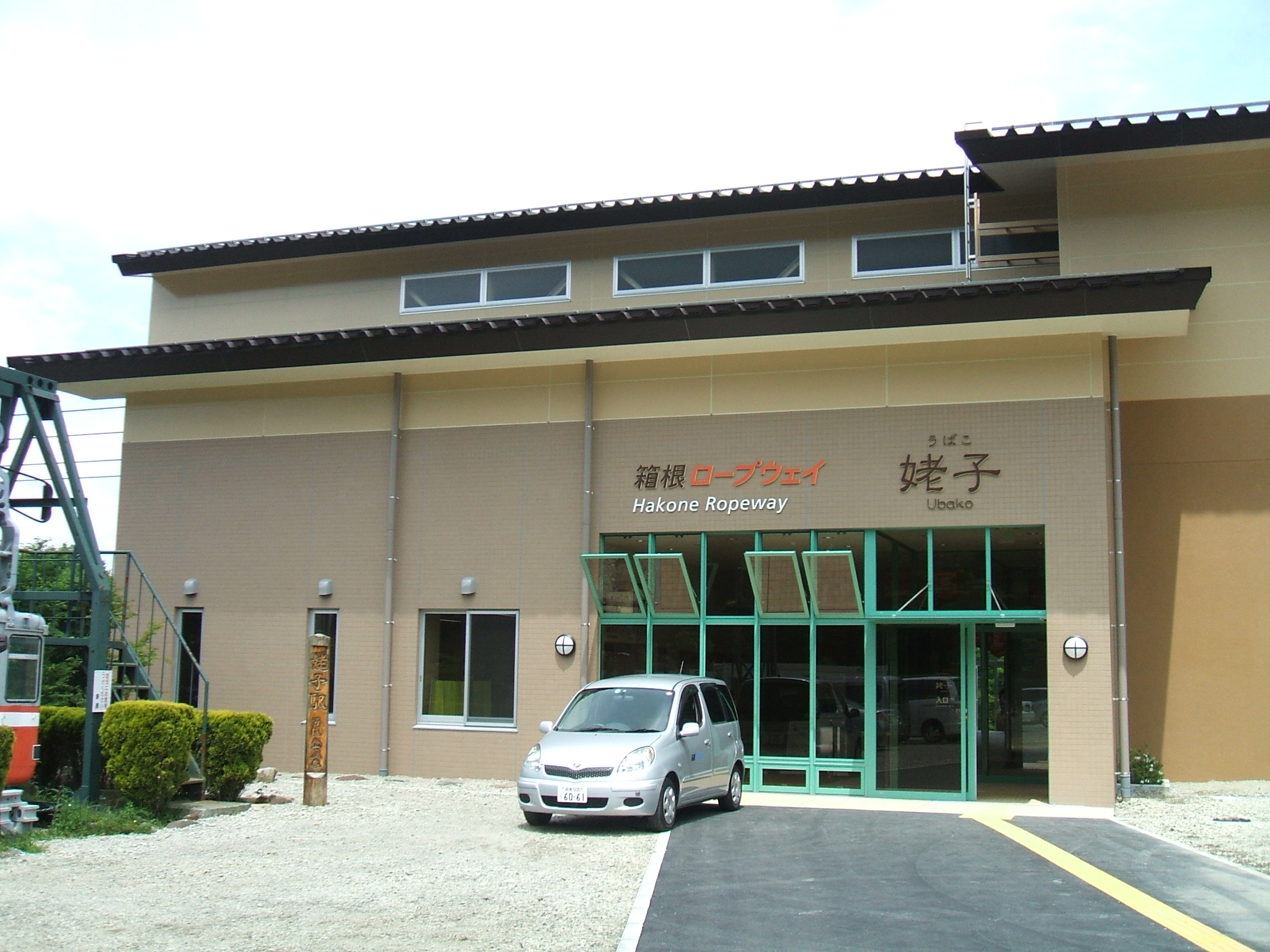
- Ubako Station

General information
- Location: 1244 Sengokuhara, Hakone, Ashigarashimo, Kanagawa; Japan
- Operator: Odakyu Hakone

History
- Opened: 1960

Services
Preceding station	Hakone Ropeway	Following station
Tōgendai Terminus	Hakone Ropeway	Ōwakudani towards Sōunzan
Location

Ubako Station (Japanese: 姥子駅, Hepburn: Ubako-eki) is a station on the Hakone Ropeway in the town of Hakone, Kanagawa, Japan. It is 2.7 kilometers (1.7 mi) from the Hakone Ropeway's terminus at Sōunzan Station, 1.3 kilometers (0.81 mi) from the Hakone Ropeway's opposing terminus at Tōgendai Station. It is located at an altitude of 878 meters (2,881 ft) in the Tōgendai area of Hakone.

== Lines ==
Ubako Station is served by the Hakone Ropeway.

== Layout ==
The boarding area is separated for Sōunzan direction and Tōgendai direction, with access by stairs or escalator, as the station is built barrier free for use by handicapped passengers.

== History ==
Ubako Station opened on September 7, 1960 with the opening of the Hakone Ropeway Line.

== Bus services ==
Izuhakone Bus 姥子 (Ubako) Bus Stop 35.244064°N 139.009148°E

- "J" line for Hakone-en (Lake Ashi) via Kojiri
- "J" line for Odawara Station via Ōwakudani, Kowaki-en, Kowakidani Station, Miyanoshita, Hakone-Yumoto Station
