= Odakyu Hakone =

Japanese mountain railway

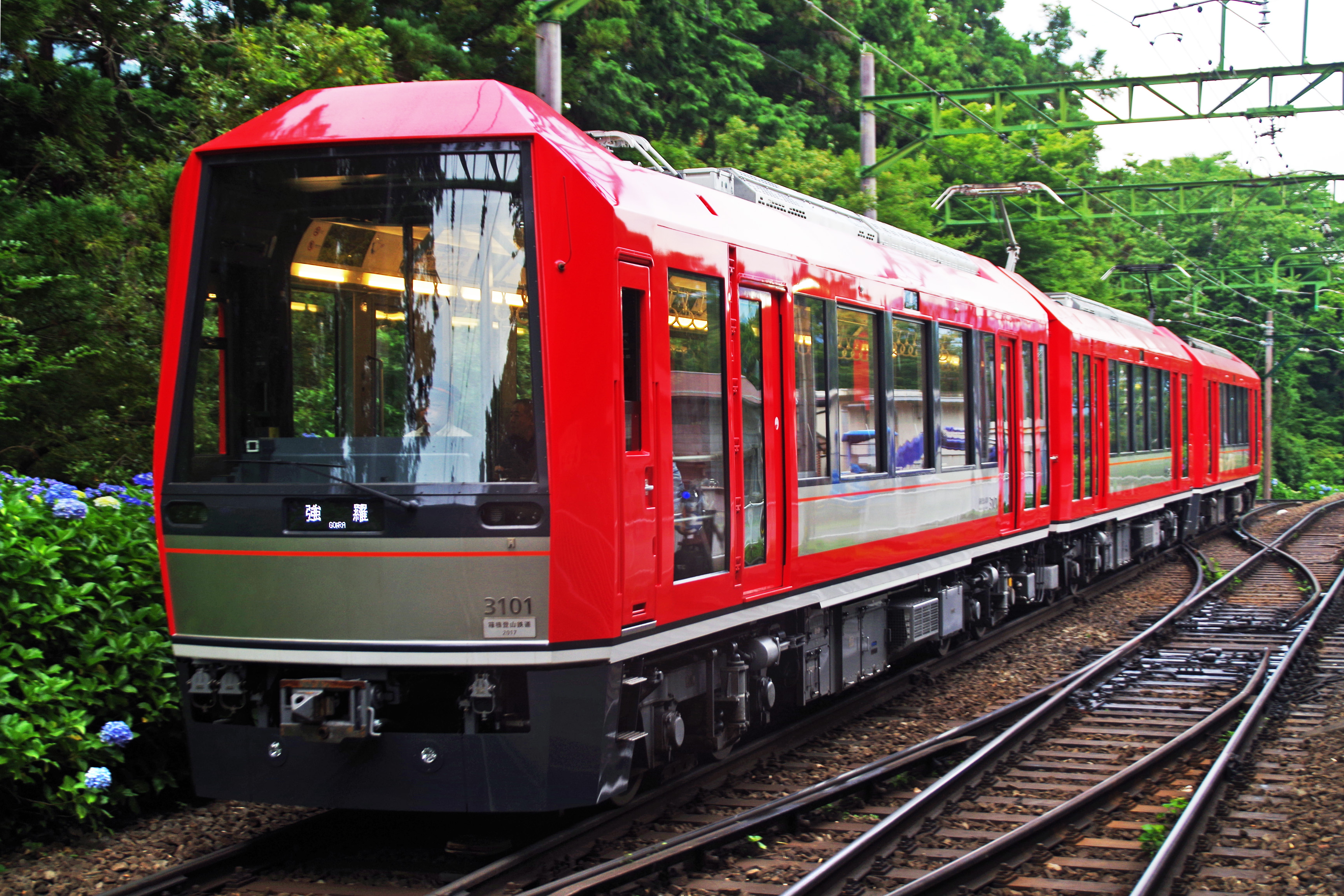
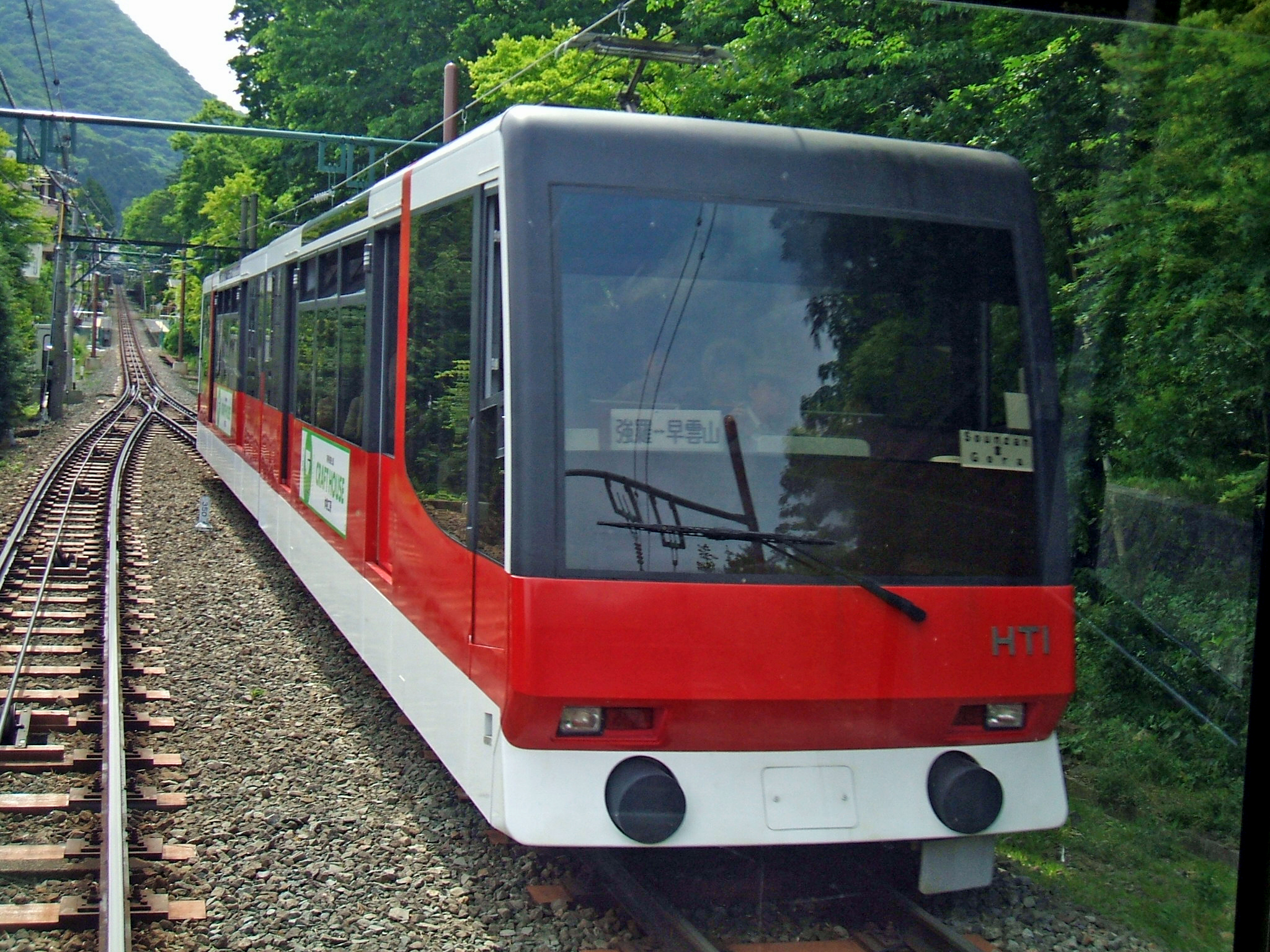
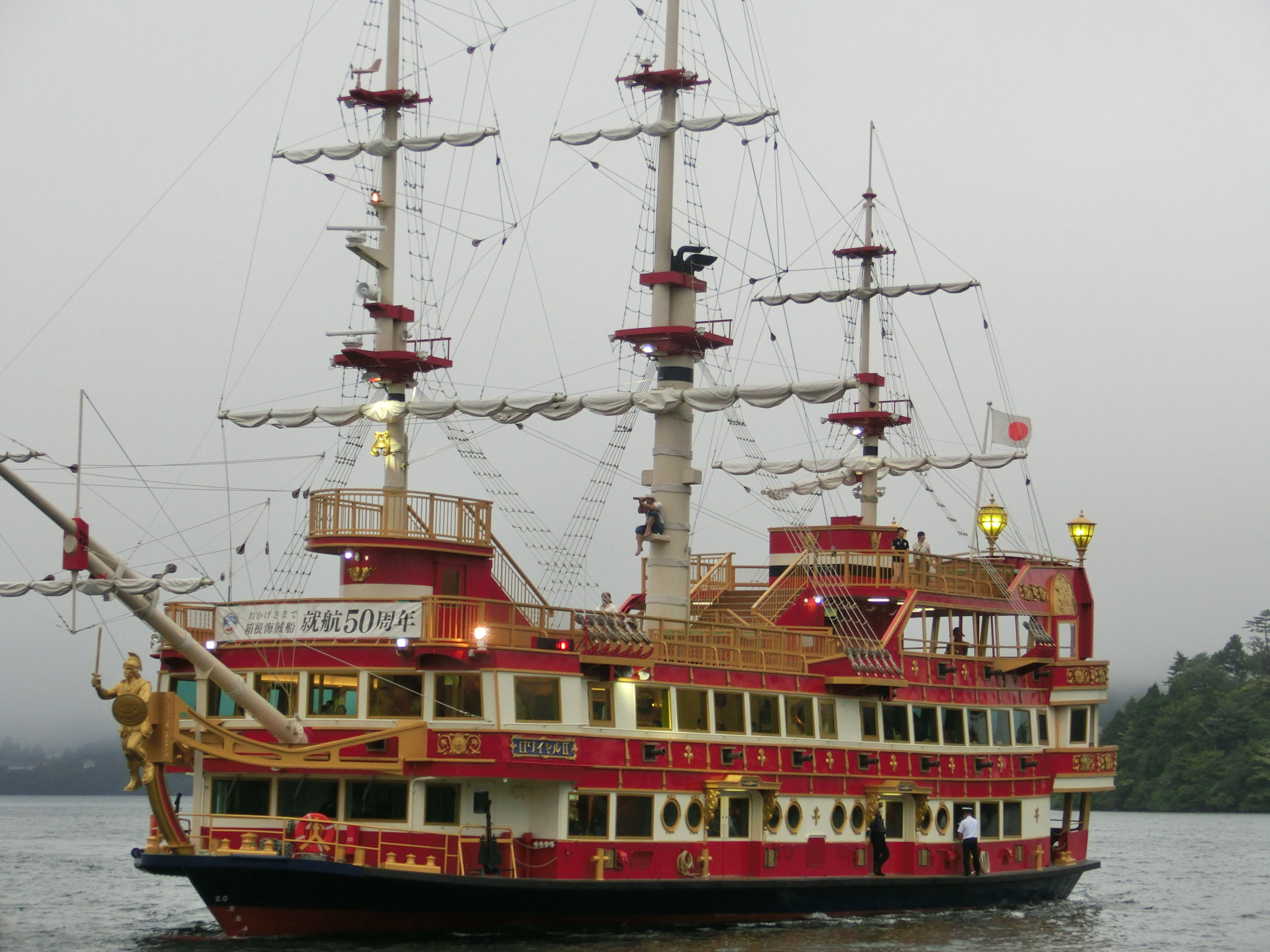
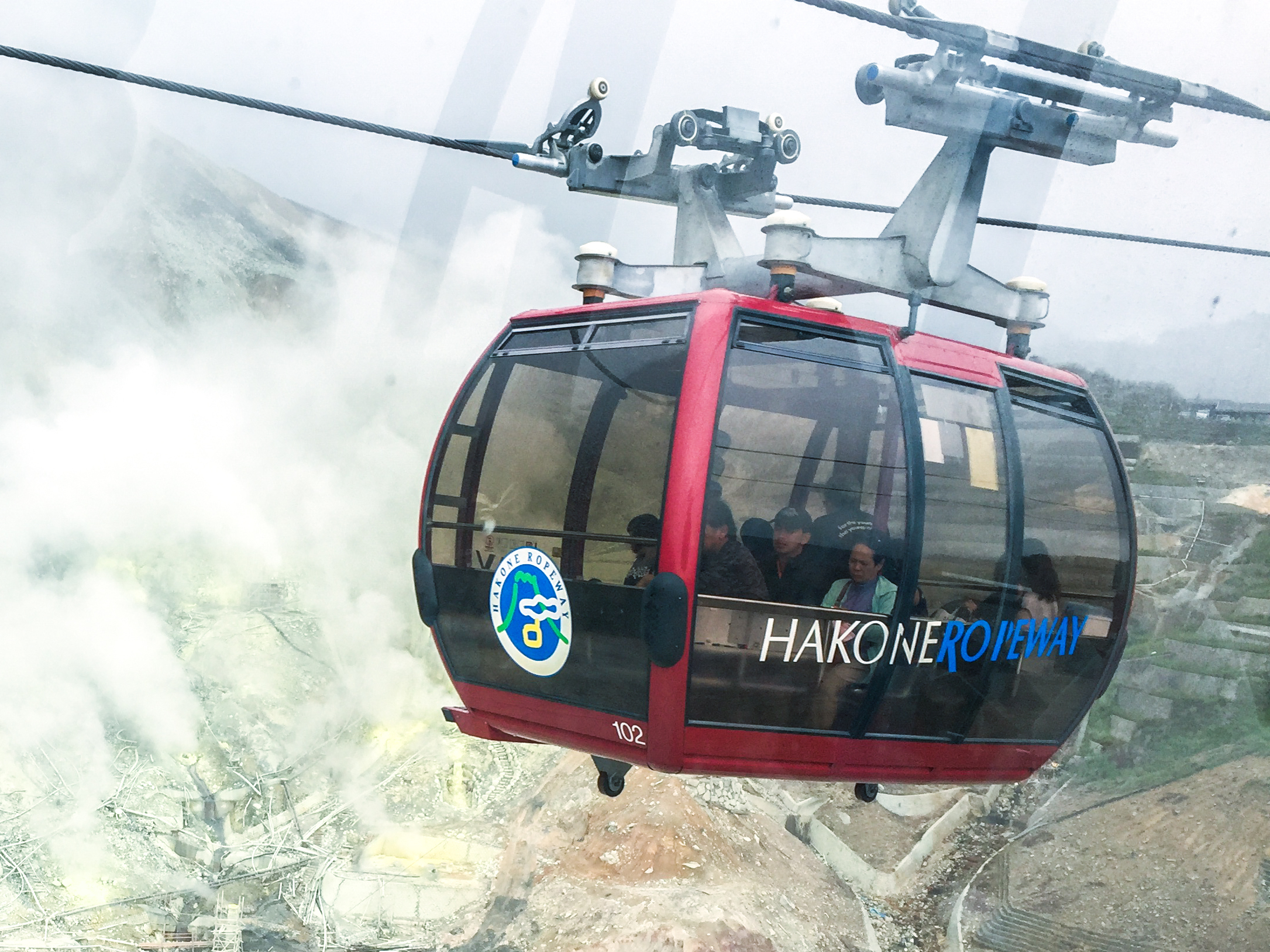
- Four of the company's services, clockwise from top left: Hakone Tozan Line, Hakone Tozan Cable Car, Hakone Ropeway, and Hakone Sightseeing Cruise

Overview
- Parent company: Odakyu Group
- Locale: Hakone, Japan
- Dates of operation: 1 April 2024–present
- Predecessor: Hakone Tozan Railway; Odakyu Hakone Holdings

Technical
- Track gauge: Odawara–Hakone-Yumoto: 1,067 mm (3 ft 6 in); Iriuda–Gōra: 1,435 mm (4 ft 8 1/2 in) standard gauge; Gōra– Sōunzan: 985 mm (3 ft 2 25/32 in)
- Length: 20.2 km (12.6 mi), excluding Hakone Sightseeing Cruise
- Highest elevation: 1,044 m (3,425 ft)
Route map

Odakyu Hakone Co., Ltd. (Japanese: 株式会社小田急箱根, Hepburn: Kabushiki Gaisha Odakyū Hakone) is a private railway company headquartered in Odawara, Kanagawa Prefecture, Japan and is a part of the Odakyu Group.

== Services ==
The company operates several services in the Odawara area including the Hakone Tozan Line, the first mountain railway in Japan; the Hakone Tozan Cable Car, a funicular; the Hakone Ropeway, an aerial lift line. Each of these services connect end-to-end providing service that extends 20.2 kilometres (12.6 mi) between Odawara and Togendai stations. At Togendai, passengers can transfer to the company's Hakone Sightseeing Cruise which provides counter-clockwise service on Lake Ashi, connecting three ports using pirate ships.

Like most Japanese railway companies, it also operates bus services in the area, namely the Hakone Tozan Bus [ja].

The company's routes operate inside the Fuji-Hakone-Izu National Park, and the routes themselves are a tourist attraction. Accordingly, the company sells a two-day pass offering unlimited travel on the Hakone Tozan Line, Hakone Tozan Cable Car, Hakone Ropeway, Hakone Sightseeing Cruise, Hakone Tozan Bus, along with other bus routes.

Major services
Type	Name	Description
Train	Hakone Tozan Line	Line operates in 2 sections: 1. Odawara — Hakone-Yumoto is a standard commuter railway line (services operated by parent company Odakyu Electric Railway); 2. Hakone-Yumoto — Gora is a mountain railway with two switchbacks. The speed limit is 40 km/h (25 mph) uphill and as slow as 25 km/h (16 mph) downhill (dependent on grade).
Cable Car (Funicular)	Hakone Tozan Cable Car	Funicular connecting Gora with Sōunzan.
Ropeway (Aerial lift/Funitel)	Hakone Ropeway	Twin ropeways Sōunzan — Ōwakudani and Ōwakudani — Tōgendai.
Sightseeing cruise	Hakone Sightseeing Cruise	Boat cruise around Lake Ashi in a pirate-themed vessel, departing from Tōgendai ropeway station.
Bus	Hakone Tozan Bus [ja]	Various bus services in the Hakone area.
Limited Express train	Romancecar	Sightseeing train service Shinjuku — Hakone-Yumoto (operated by parent company Odakyu Electric Railway)

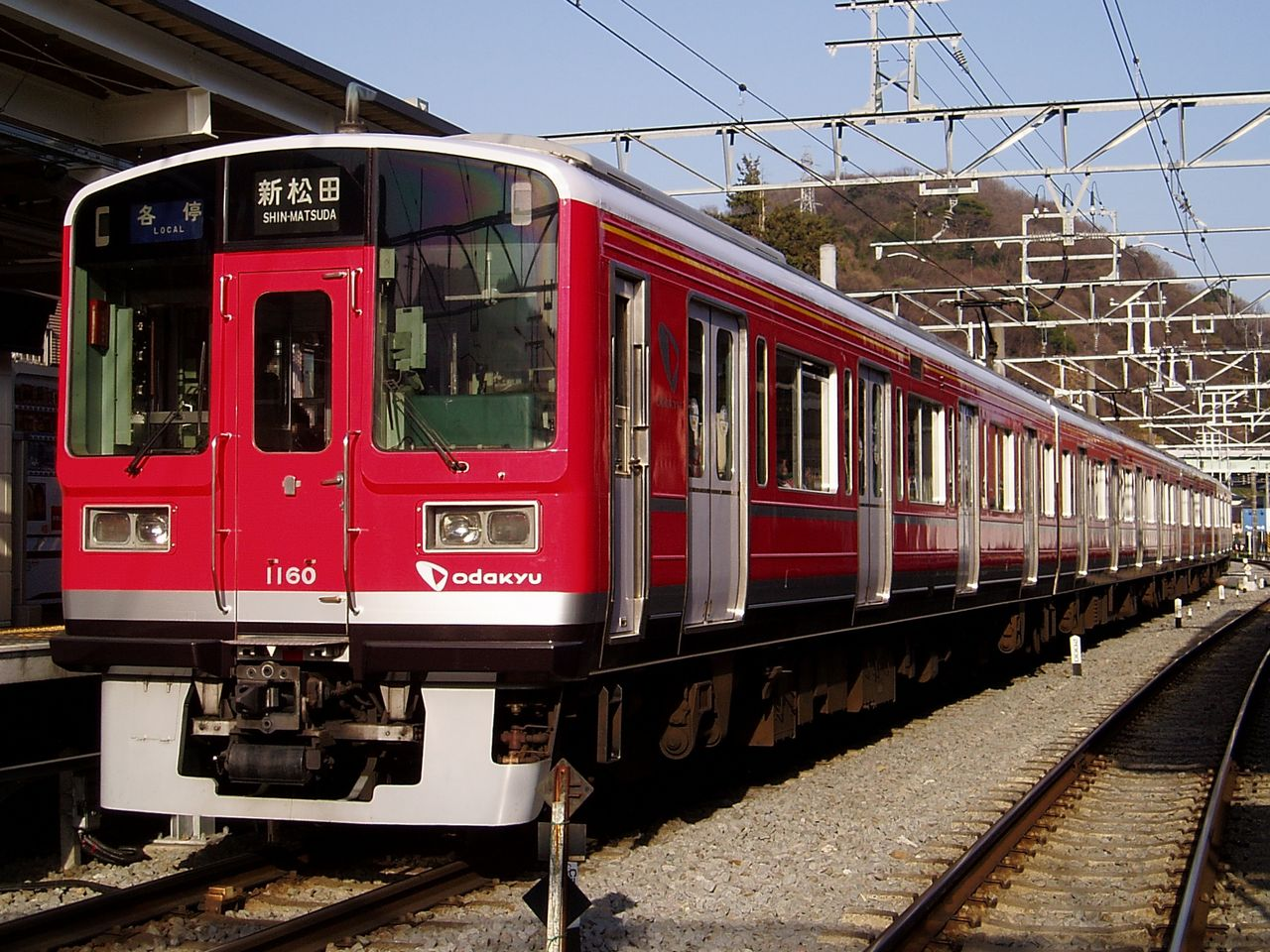
Odakyu 1000 series commuter train at Kazamatsuri Station

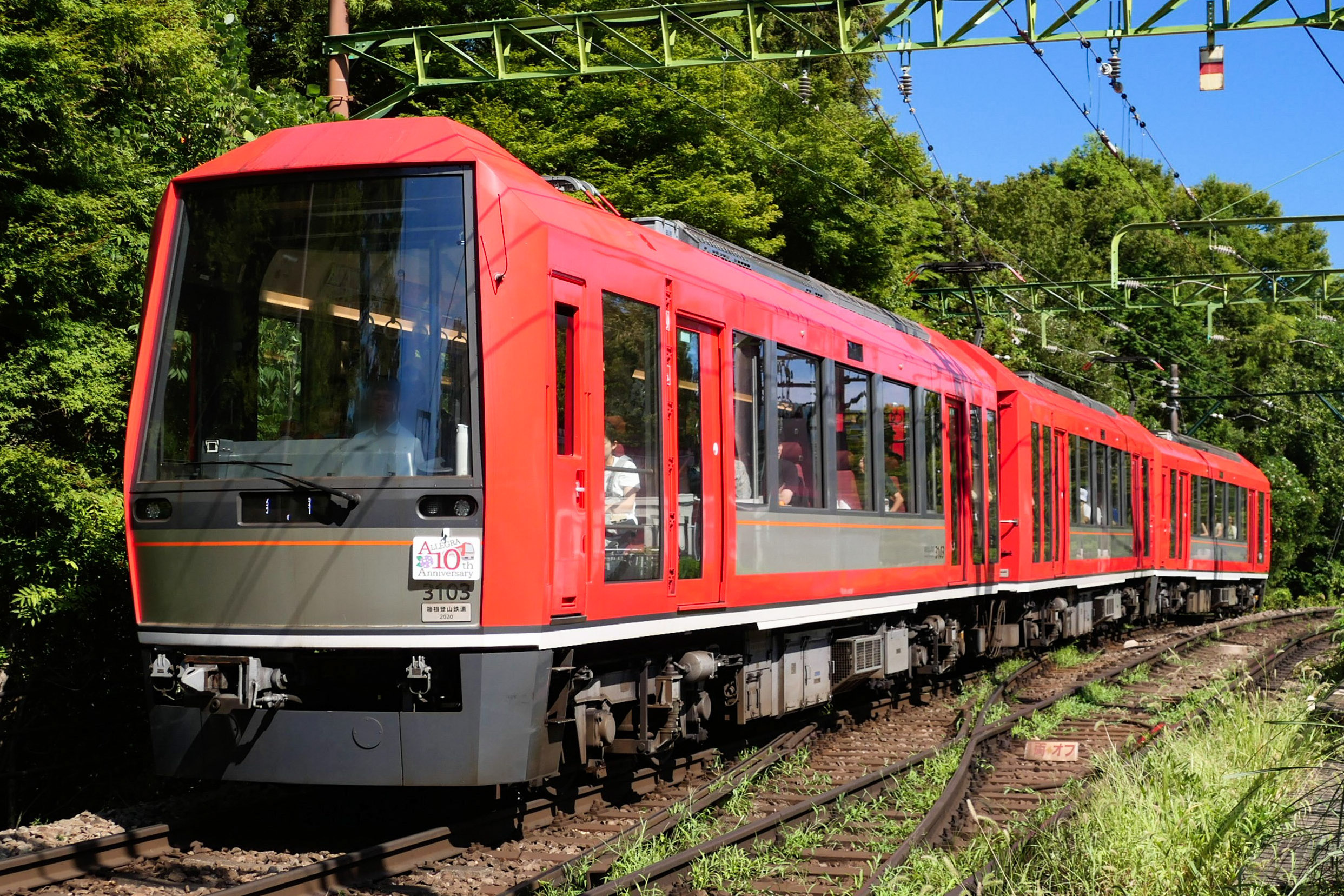
Hakone Tozan Railway Line 3100 series 3-car train approaching Ohiradai Station

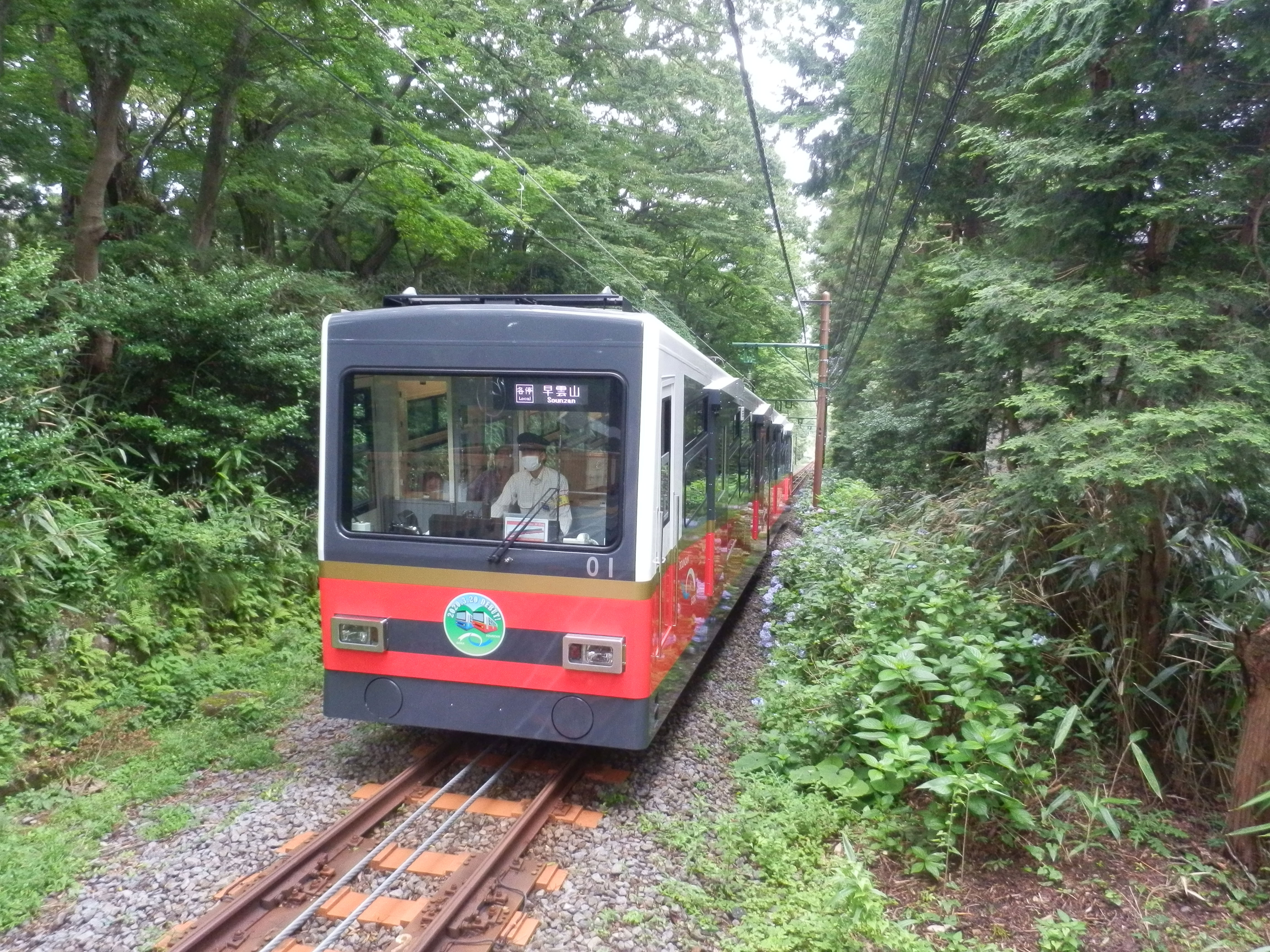
Hakone Tozan Cable Car at Kami-Gōra Station

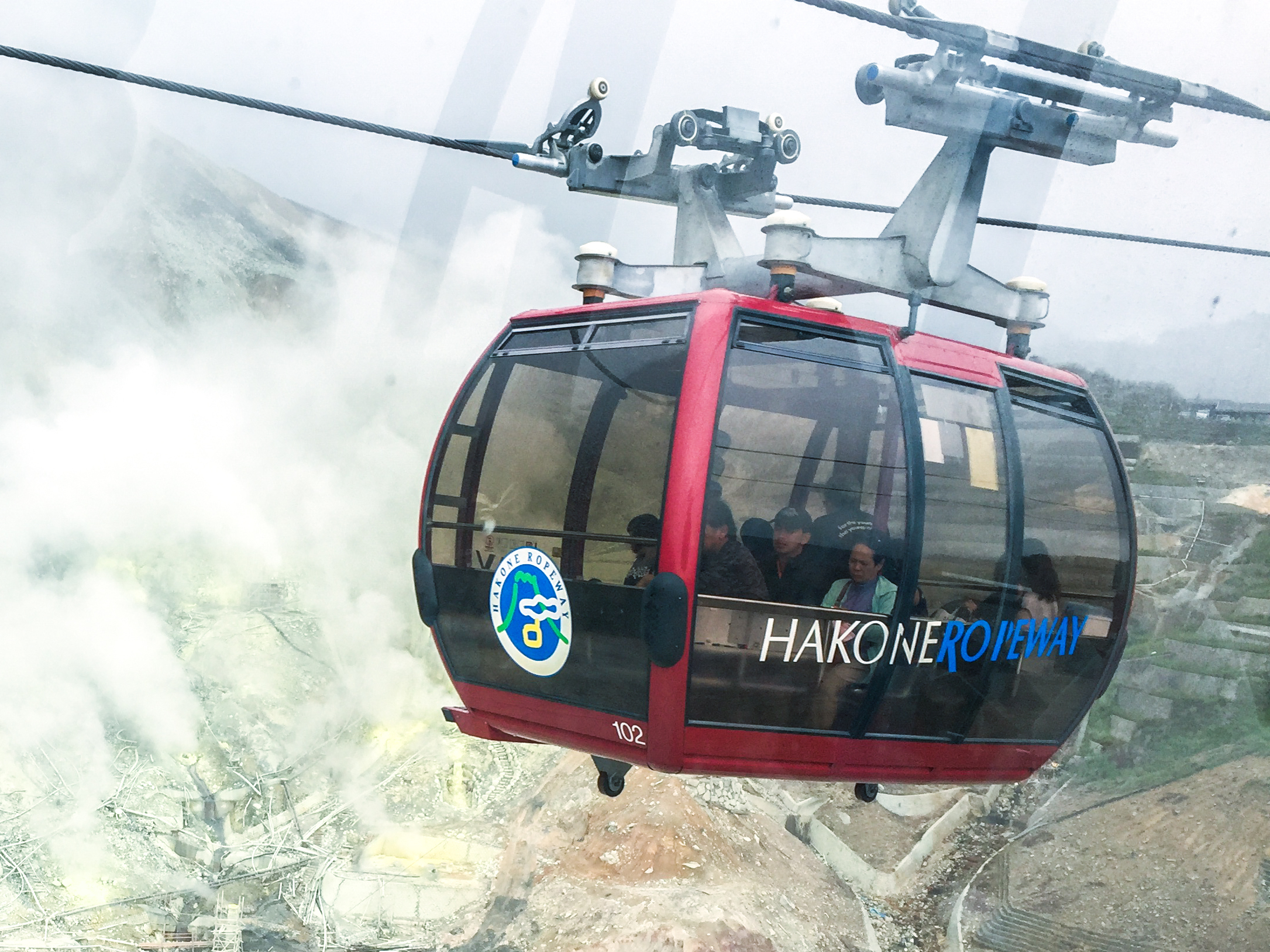
Hakone Ropeway

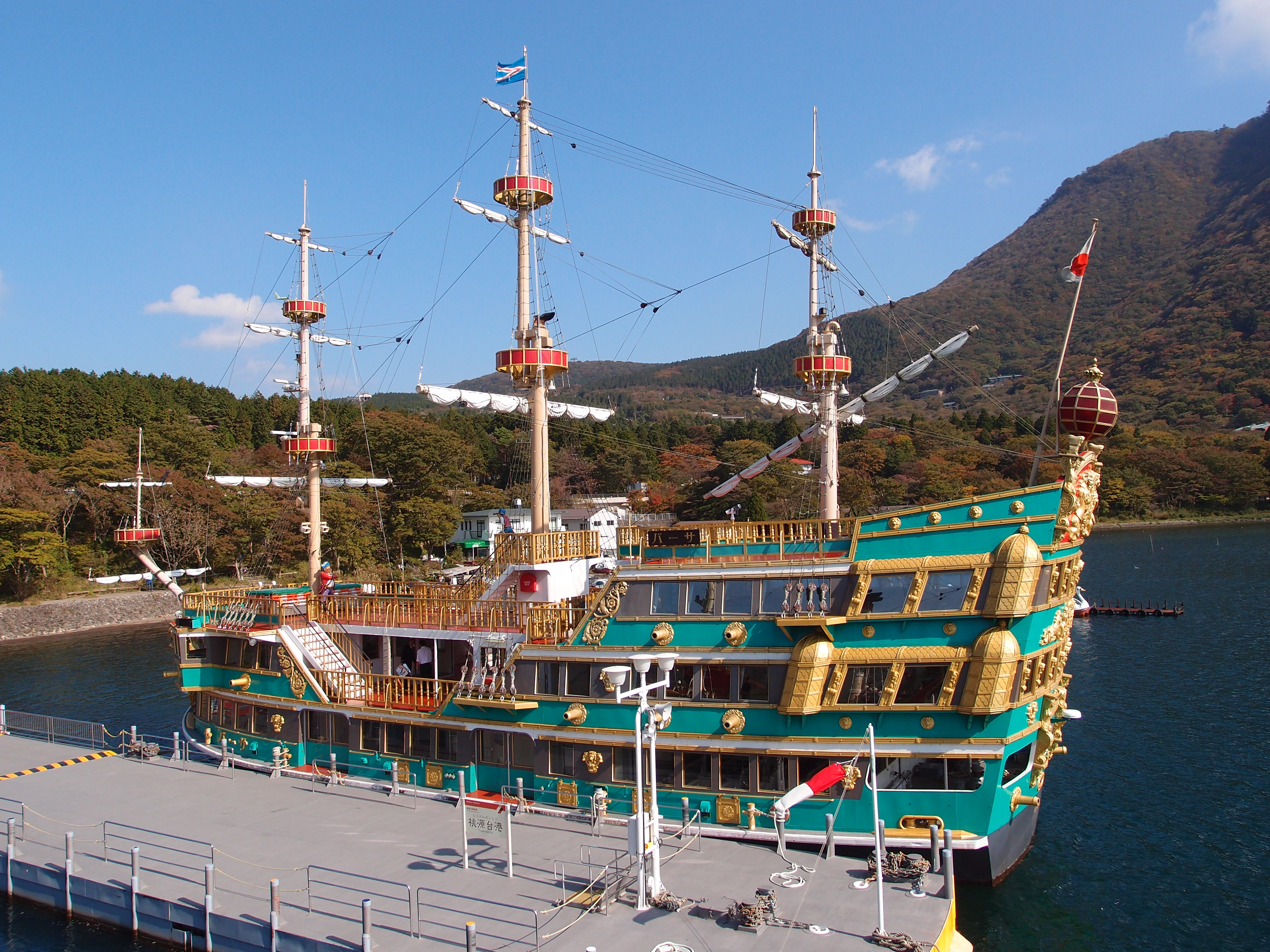
Hakone Sightseeing Cruise (2013)

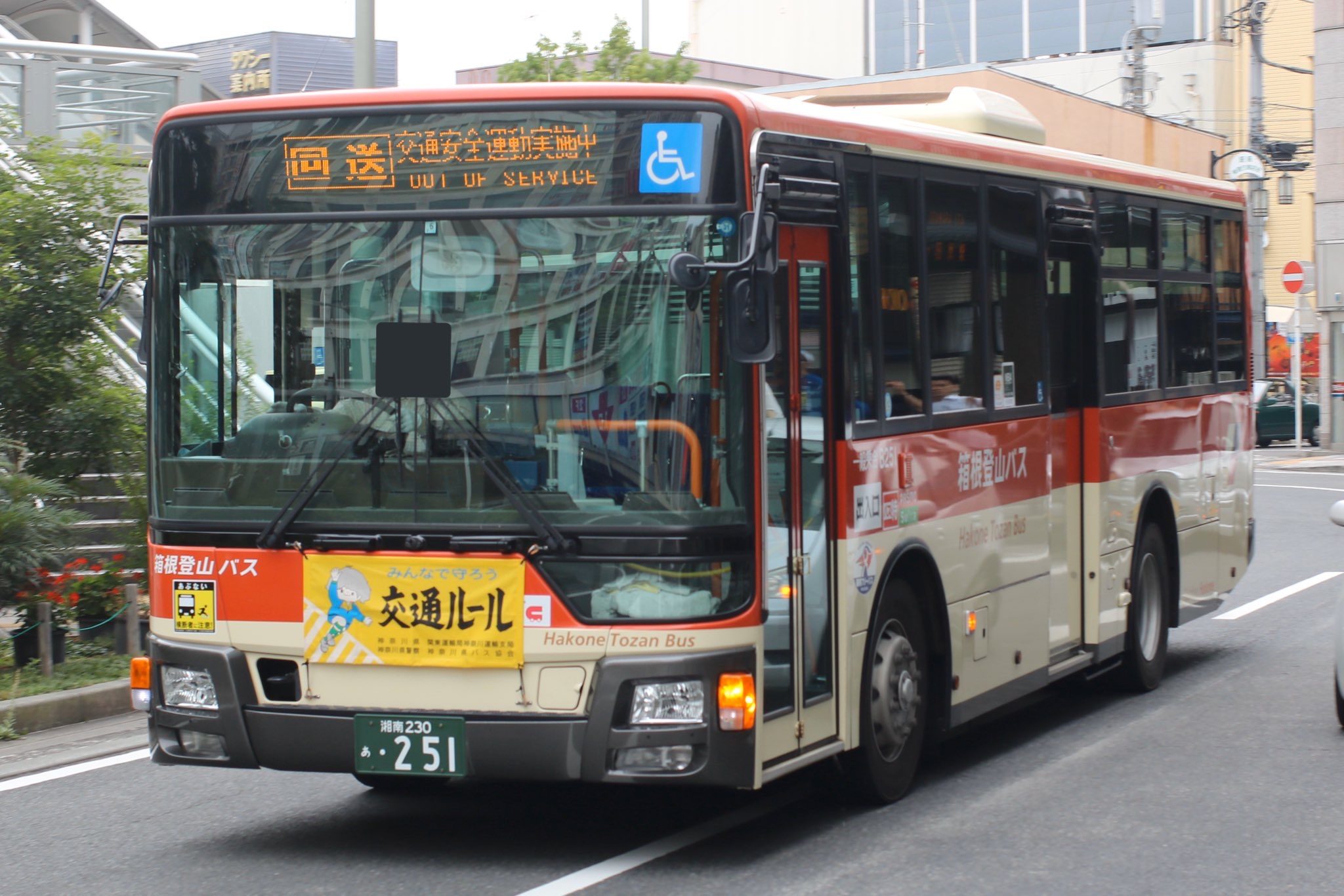
Hakone Tozan Bus

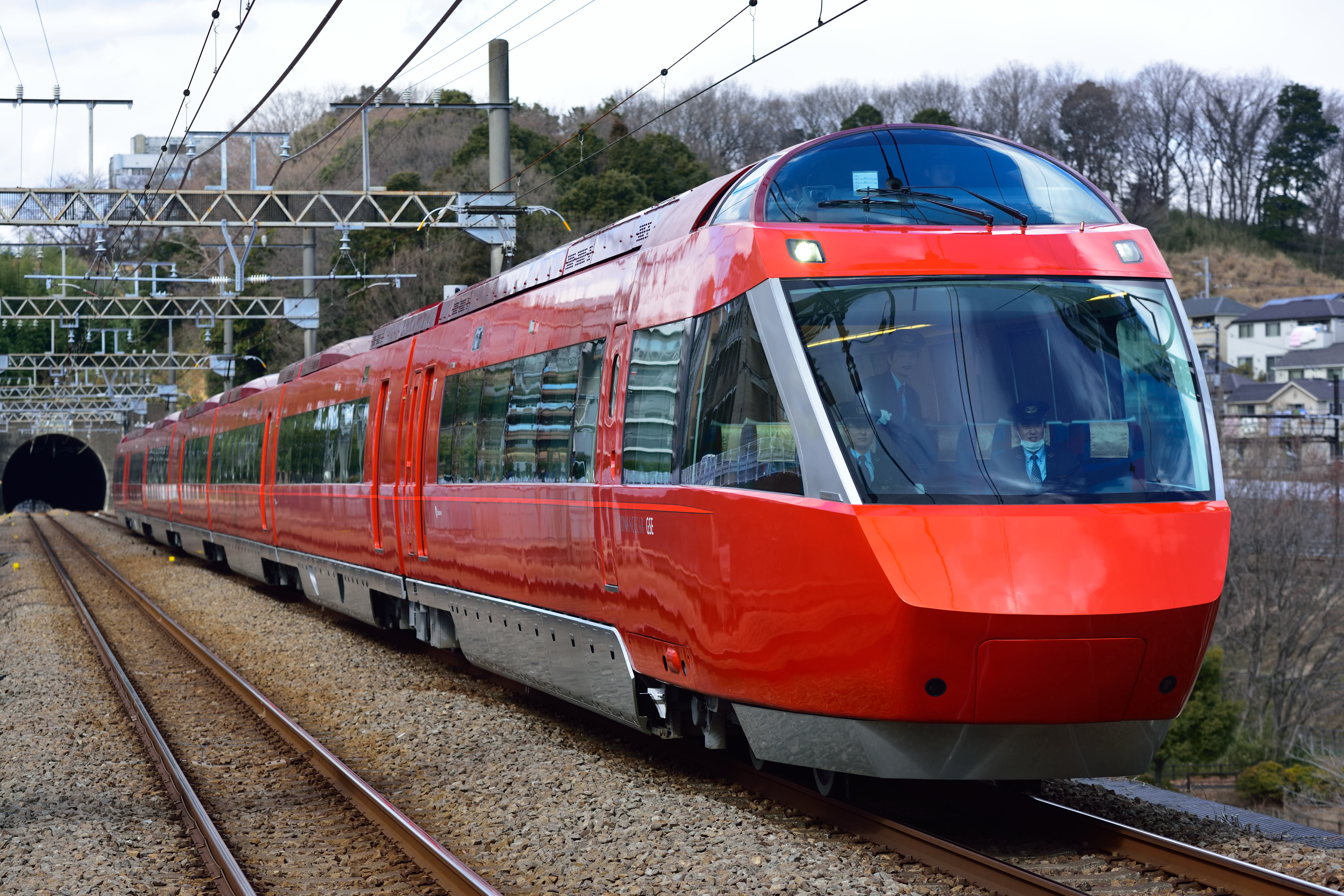
Odakyu 70000 series GSE Romancecar at Haruhino Station

== History ==
The Odakyu Hakone company was formed on 1 April 2024 as part of a larger restructuring of Odakyu Group operations in the Hakone area. It is a merger of several transportation, real estate, and sightseeing business, including the Hakone Tozan Railway company, which operated the Hakone Tozan Line. All companies were subsidiaries of the Odakyu Group prior to the merger and held under the Odakyu Hakone Holdings company, the latter of which was also folded into the merger.

== See also ==
- Rhaetian Railway, A Swiss mountain railway network, twinning railway with Hakone Tozan Railway.
