= Tōgendai Station =

Cable car station in Hakone, Kanagawa Prefecture, Japan

Coordinates: 35°14′16.3″N 138°59′40.5″E

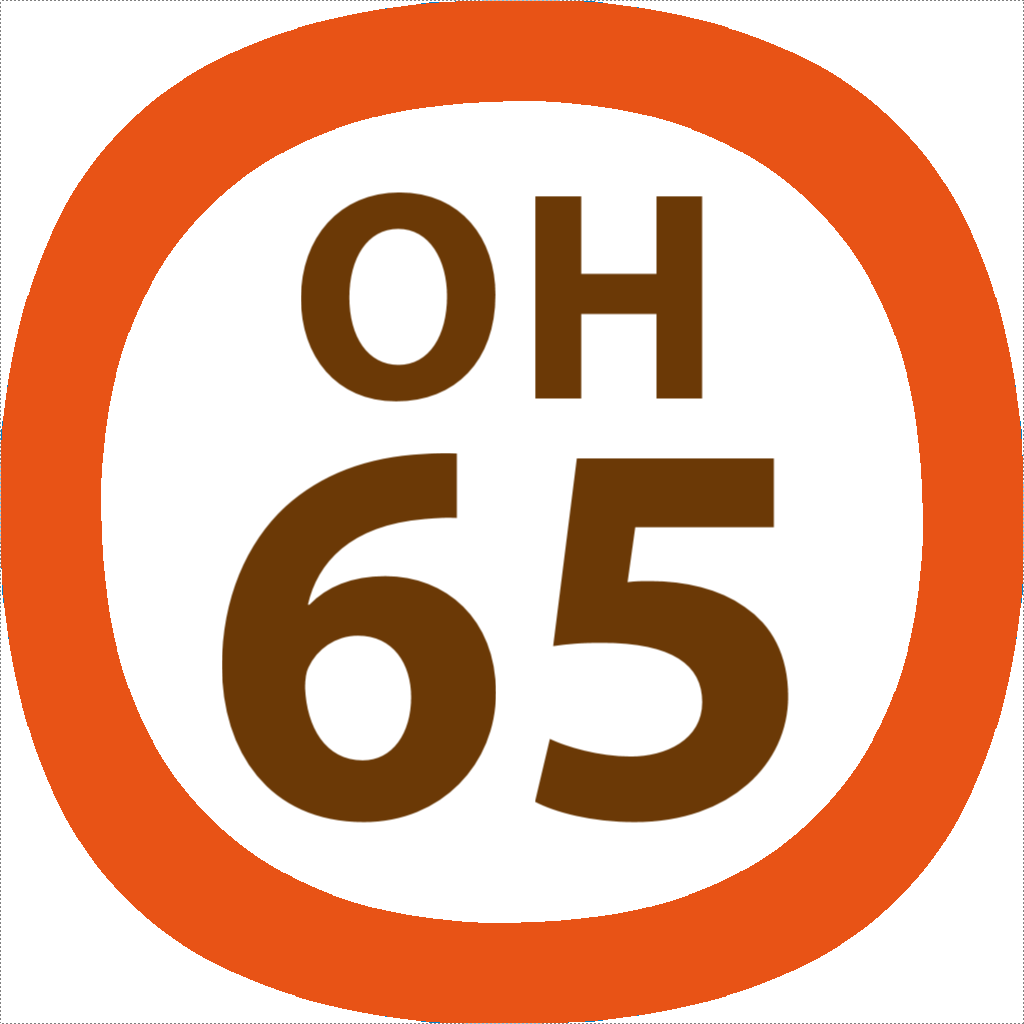
Tōgendai Station 桃源台駅

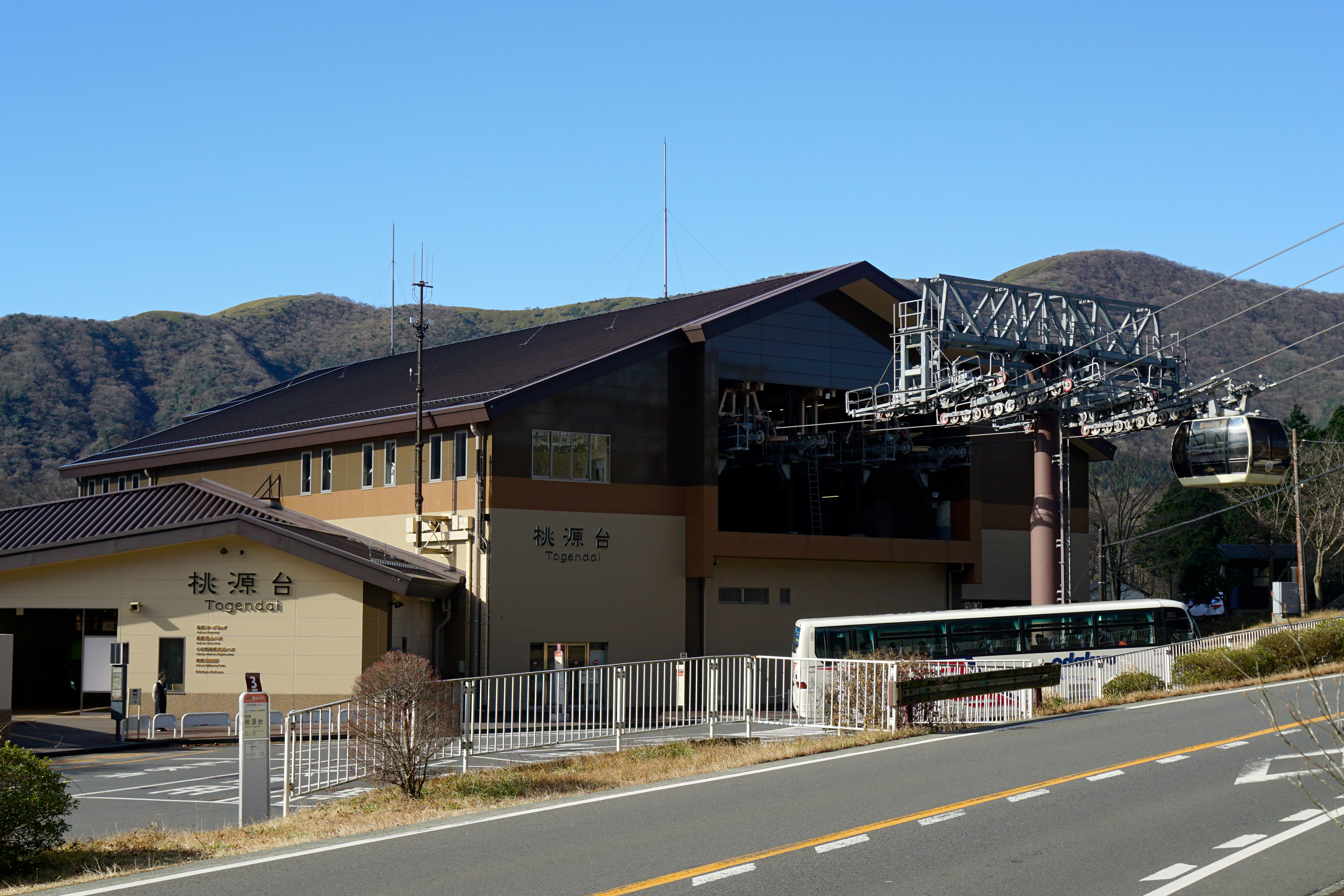
- Tōgendai Station

General information
- Location: 164 Motohakone, Hakone, Ashigarashimo, Kanagawa; Japan
- Operator: Odakyu Hakone
- Connections: Hakone Sightseeing Cruise; Bus terminal

History
- Opened: 1960

Services
Preceding station	Hakone Ropeway	Following station
Terminus	Hakone Ropeway	Ubako towards Sōunzan
Location

Tōgendai Station (Japanese: 桃源台駅, Hepburn: Tōgendai-eki) is a terminal on the Hakone Ropeway in the town of Hakone, Kanagawa, Japan. It is 4.0 kilometers (2.5 mi) from the Hakone Ropeway's opposing terminus at Sōunzan Station. It is located at an altitude of 741 meters (2,431 ft) in the Togendai area of Hakone.

== Lines ==
Tōgendai Station is served by the Hakone Ropeway.

== Layout ==
The boarding area for the Hakone Ropeway is on the second floor, with access by stairs or escalator, as the station is built barrier free for use by handicapped passengers.

== History ==
Tōgendai Station opened on September 7, 1960, with the opening of the Hakone Ropeway Line.

== Other transportation ==
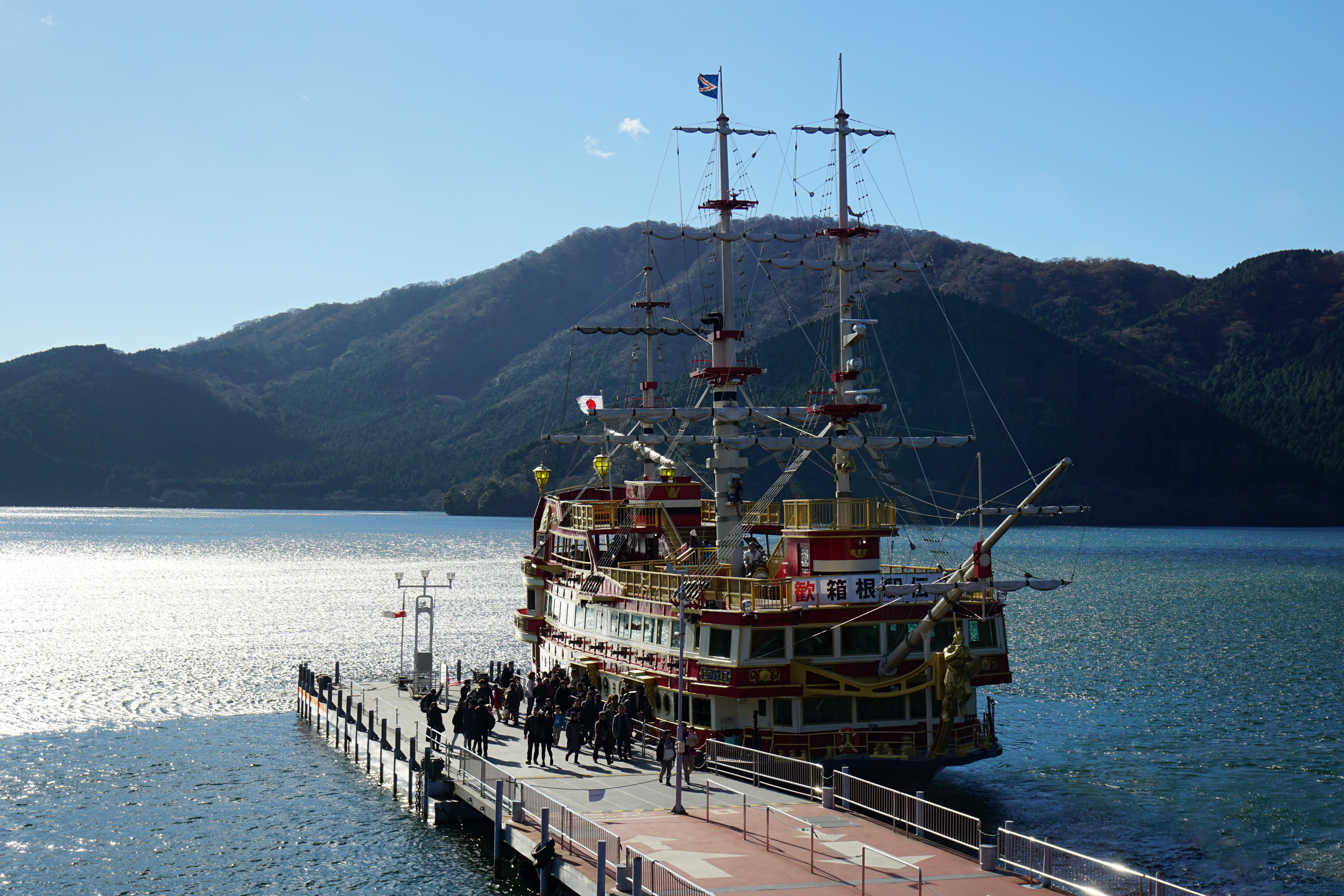
Hakone Sightseeing Cruise at Tōgendai Port

- Hakone Sightseeing Cruise
  - for Hakone-machi and Moto-hakone
- Hakone Tozan Bus
  - Bus stop 1
    - "T" Line for Hakone Yumoto Station and Odawara Station, via Sengoku-Kogen (Pampas grass viewing spot), Senkyoro mae (transfer for Pola Museum of Art, Hakone Art Museum (Kōen-Kami Station), Gora Park, Gora Station, Hakone Open-Air Museum, Kowaki-en, Yunessun, and Ten-yu), Kawamukai (The Little Prince and Saint-Exupéry Museum), Sengoku Annaijo (Hakone Botanical Garden of Wetlands, Lalique Museum), Hakone Venetian Glass Museum, and Miyanoshita (transfer for Hakone Tozan Railway for Gora Station, and Bus for Moto-Hakone direction)
- Odakyu Hakone Highway Bus
  - Bus stop 2
    - "W" Line for Shinjuku Station (in Tokyo), via Otome Toge (Mount Fuji viewing spot), JR Gotemba Station (transfer for Gotemba Premium Outlets, Mount Fuji and Fuji Five Lakes, including Lake Kawaguchi and Lake Yamanaka), Tōmei-Gotemba (transfer for JR Tōmei Expressway Bus for JR Shizuoka Station and JR Nagoya Station)
    - "V" Line for Haneda Airport via JR Yokohama Station (joint operation with Keikyu Bus)
  - Bus stop 3
    - "W" Line for Hakone-En, Odakyu Hotel de Yama (Next to Hakone Shrine) via Kojiri
