= Hashikurasan Ropeway =

Japanese cable car line

Coordinates: 34°2′50.8″N 133°50′26″E

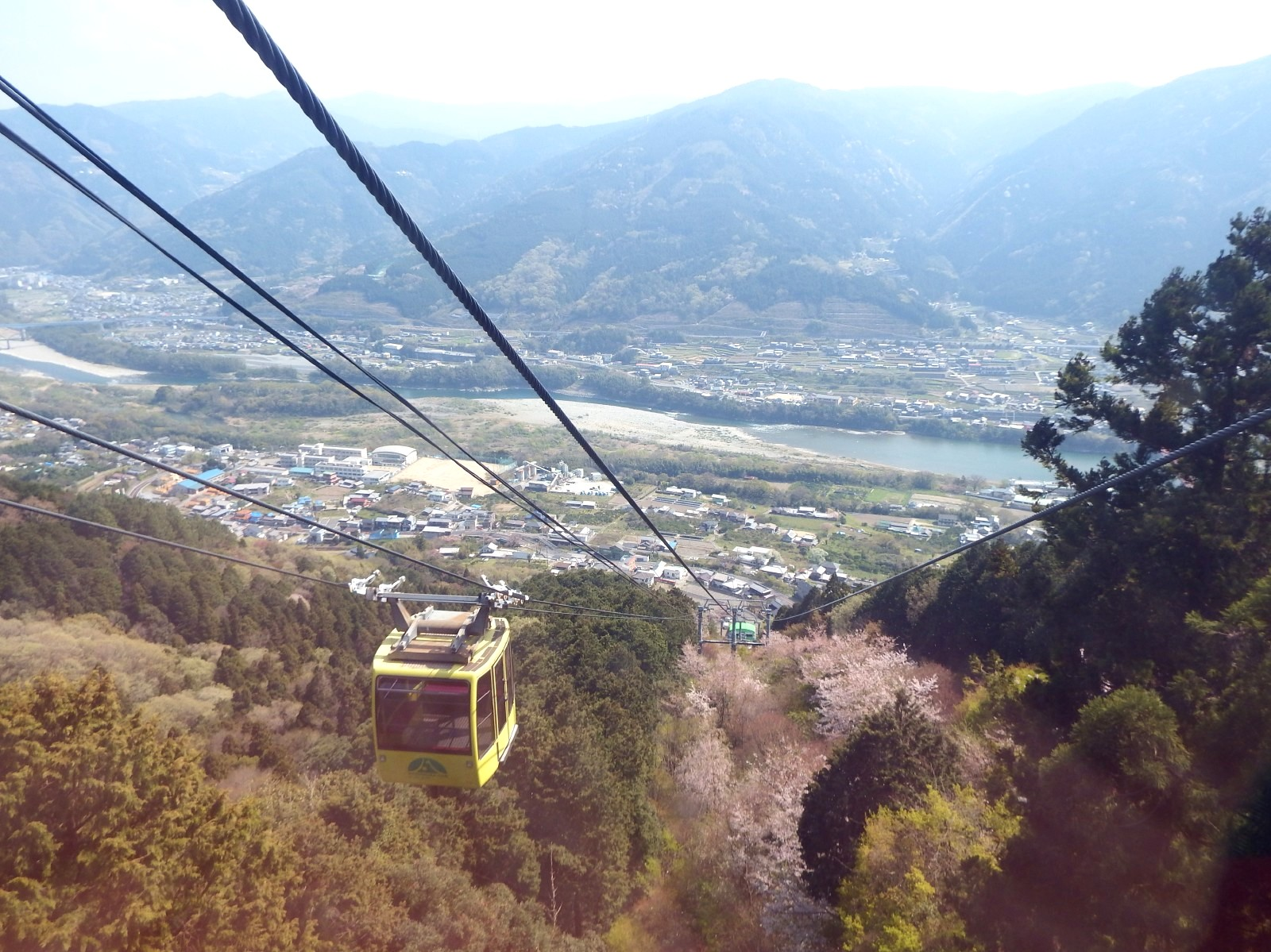
Cabin on the ropeway, 2018

The Hashikurasan Ropeway (箸蔵山ロープウェイ, Hashikurasan Rōpuwei) is the name of Japanese aerial lift line in Ikeda, Tokushima, as well as its operator. The line climbs Mount Hashikura of Hashikura-dera, a famous temple.

Refurbished in 1999, this is the first funitel to be operated in Asia. As of October 2007, there are three other funitel lines in Japan. However, all other lines are funitel gondola lifts, while Hashikurasan Ropeway is the only funitel aerial tramway.

== History ==
The route to Hashikura-dera was originally linked by a funicular railway called Hashikura Tozan Railway (箸蔵登山鉄道), opened in 1930. The line closed in 1944. In 1971, Shikoku Cable opened a chairlift running on the former funicular line route, as well as an aerial tramway that links the chairlift terminus and the temple. Another aerial tramway opened along the chairlift line in 1977. In 1999, two aerial tramways were refurbished into one funitel line, eliminating the need of transfer.

In 2020, the ropeway was to be used as part of the torch relay for the 2020 Summer Olympics, but this was delayed to 2021 due to the COVID-19 pandemic.

== Basic data ==
- System: Funitel
- Cable length: 948 m (3,110 ft)
- Vertical interval: 342 m (1,122 ft)
- Operational speed: 5.0 m/s
- Passenger capacity per a cabin: 32
- Cabins: 2
- Stations: 2

== Stations ==
- Base Station: Tozanguchi Station (登山口駅)
- Top Station: Hashikuraji Station (箸蔵寺駅)

== See also ==
- List of aerial lifts in Japan
