= Funitel =

Aerial gondola suspended from two cables

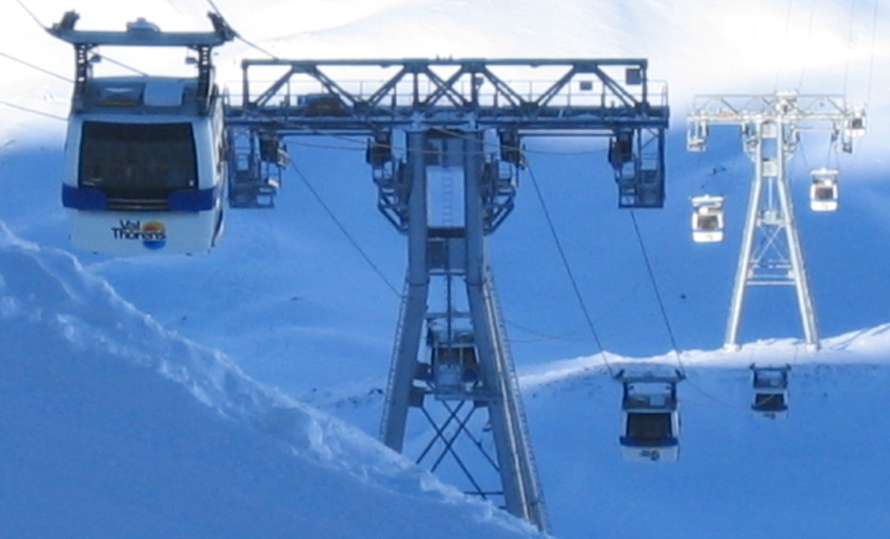
Funitel at Val Thorens, France

A funitel is a type of cableway, generally used to transport skiers, although at least one is used to transport finished cars between different areas of a factory. It differs from a standard gondola lift through the use of two arms attached to two parallel overhead cables, providing more stability in high winds. The name funitel is a portmanteau of the French words funiculaire and téléphérique.

When used to transport skiers, funitels are a fast way to get to a higher altitude. Skis or snowboards have to be taken off and held during the trip. Depending on the configuration, cabins may or may not contain seats. Without seats, funitels can sometimes be uncomfortable for long trips, in the same way other large cable cars can be. Funitels combine a short time between successive cabins with a capacity of around 20 to 30 people per cabin.

== Overview ==
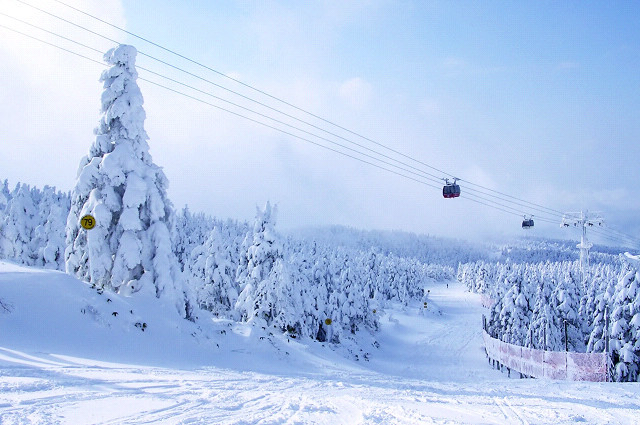
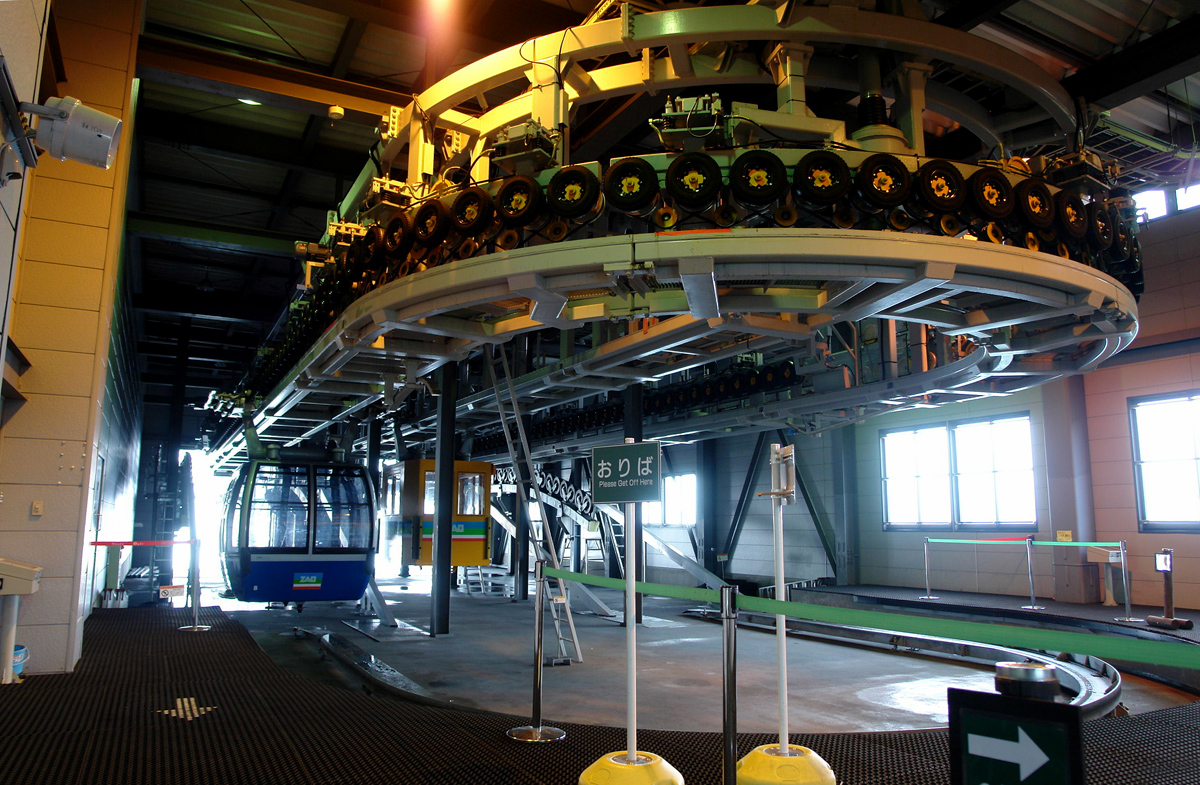
Funitel in Zaō Onsen, Japan. The bottom image shows inside one of the stations
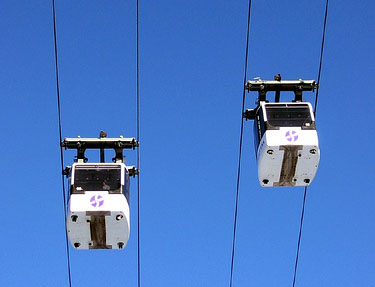
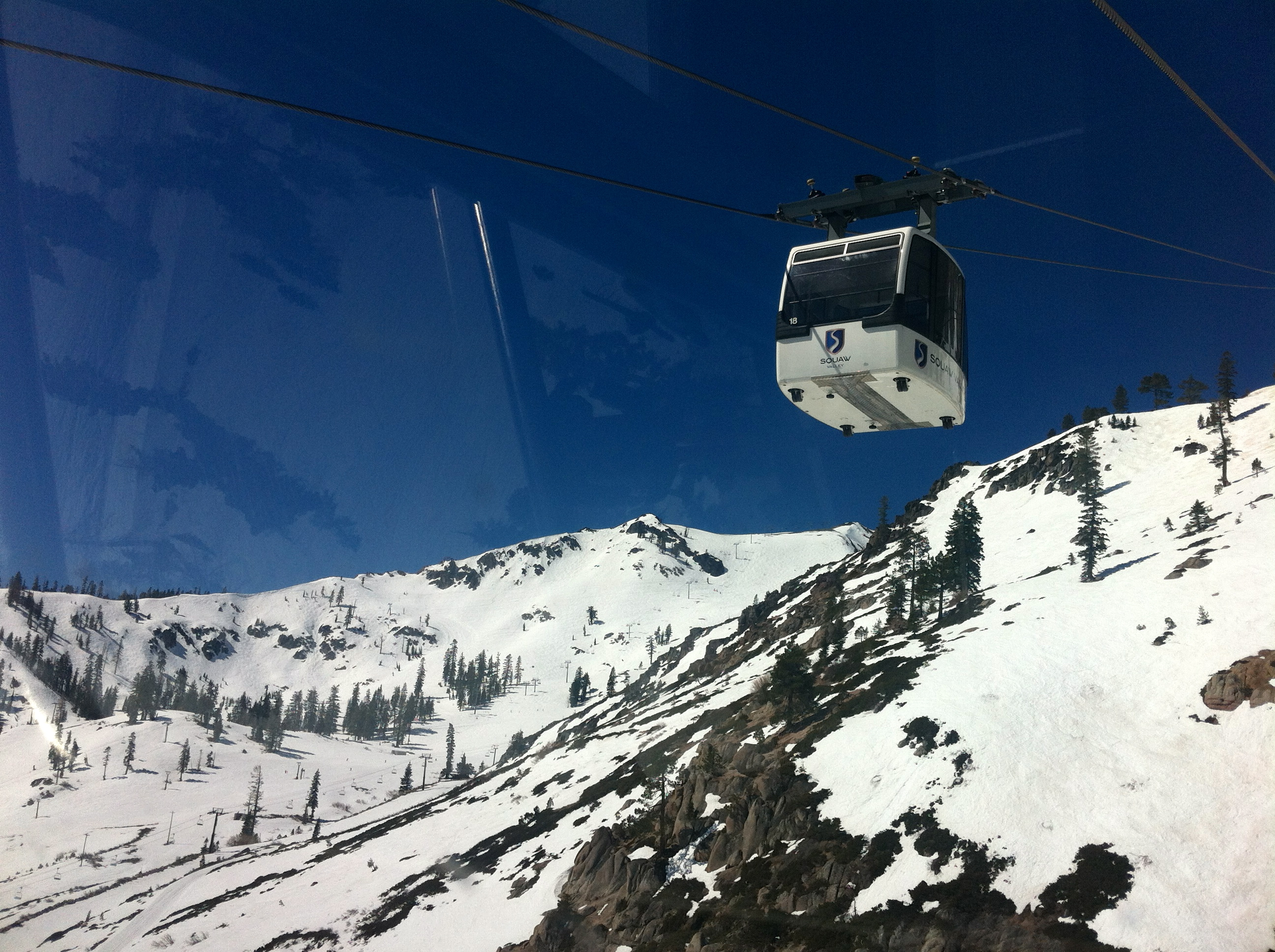
Palisades Tahoe funitel

A funitel installation employs two cables (or a single cable arranged in two loops) strung between two terminals and supported by intermediate towers. During transit from terminal to terminal each of a series of detachable passenger cabins is suspended from the two cables which move in parallel at exactly the same rate. The technology was developed from the Double Monocable Creissels (DMC) lift, which featured two so-called monocables (supplying both support and propulsion) moving in parallel and spaced about one meter apart. This technology was developed by the French engineering company Denis Creissels SA and was manufactured by Poma in the 1980s. In the 1990s the first funitels were built, differing from earlier DMC lifts by having the two cables spaced far enough apart for the cabin to be hung between the cables, instead of underneath, thus eliminating the need for a long hanger arm which makes the carrier assembly susceptible to swinging in strong winds. The two cables in these early funitel installations have separate tensioning systems and separate, electrically synchronized motors, one for each cable. Later the double-loop monocable (DLM) was developed, featuring a single cable looped around twice, as the diagram below shows. DLM ensures that the cable sections from which a cabin is suspended move at the same speed without motor synchronization.

The first funitel was constructed in Val-Thorens, 1990, by Denis Creissels SA and Enterprises Reel and Städeli-Lift. The first funitel-style lift constructed outside Europe was near Mammoth Mountain, California at June Mountain ski area, built by Yan Lift in 1988. Jan Kunczynski, the owner of Yan, actually claimed to have invented the funitel lift with reference to US Patent 4,848,241. The Yan "QMC" differed, however, from other funitels in having a quad-monocable design with vertically aligned drive sheaves. The QMC suffered from various design flaws including the famously unsafe Yan cable grips and was shut down by California safety inspectors in 1996 and dismantled over the course of the next few years.

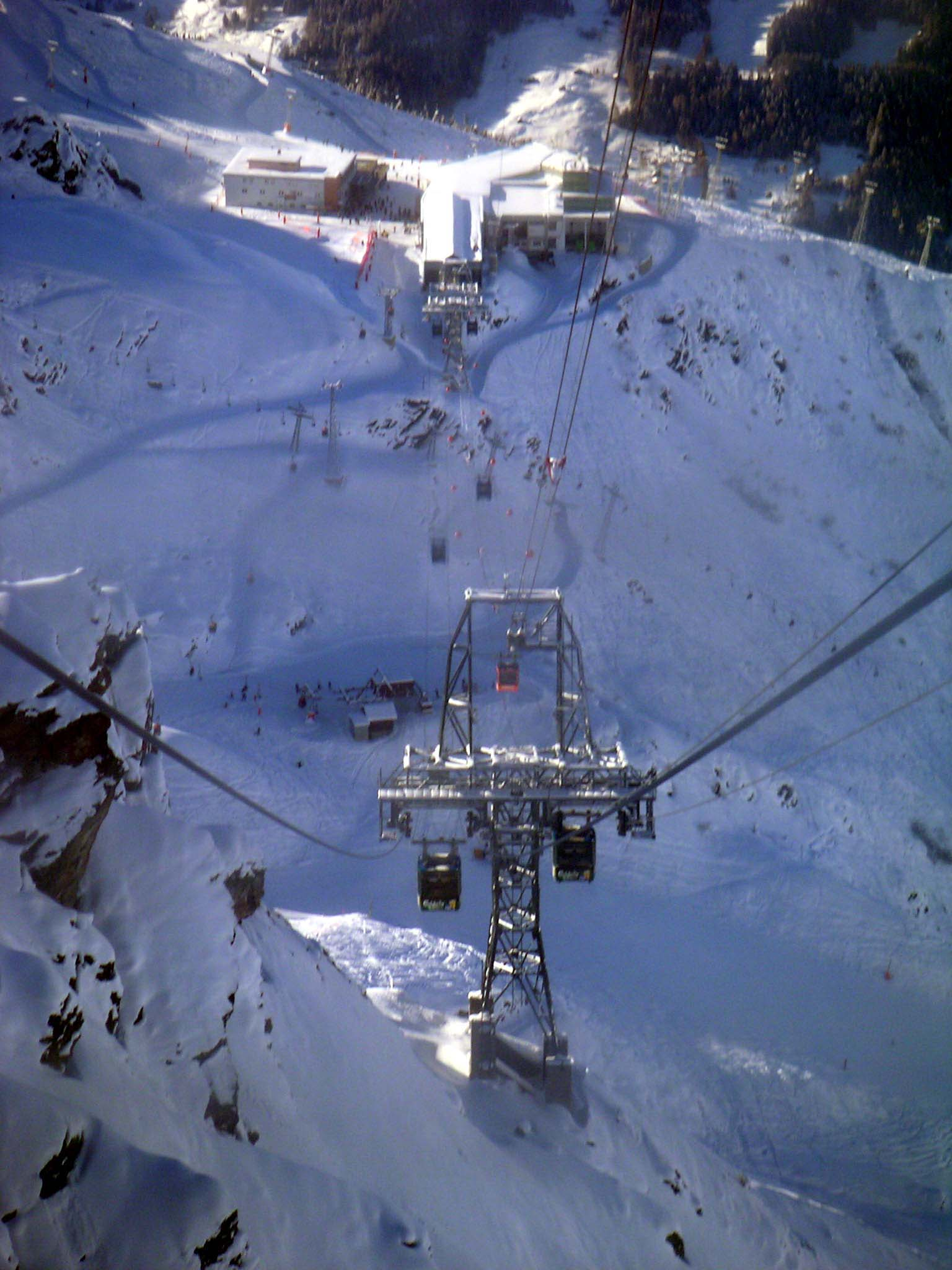
The funitel at Verbier, Switzerland. An evacuation line runs above the funitel

Funitel passenger cabins are connected to the overhead cable sections with four spring-loaded grips — two for each cable section. As with other detachable-carrier lifts the cabins are decelerated and detached from the cables at the terminal for boarding, then accelerated and reattached for transit to the other terminal.

Diagram of where the cabins detach and attach

Diagram of the double-loop monocable (DLM) system. The circle and white arrow represent the drive

=== Reversible funitel ===
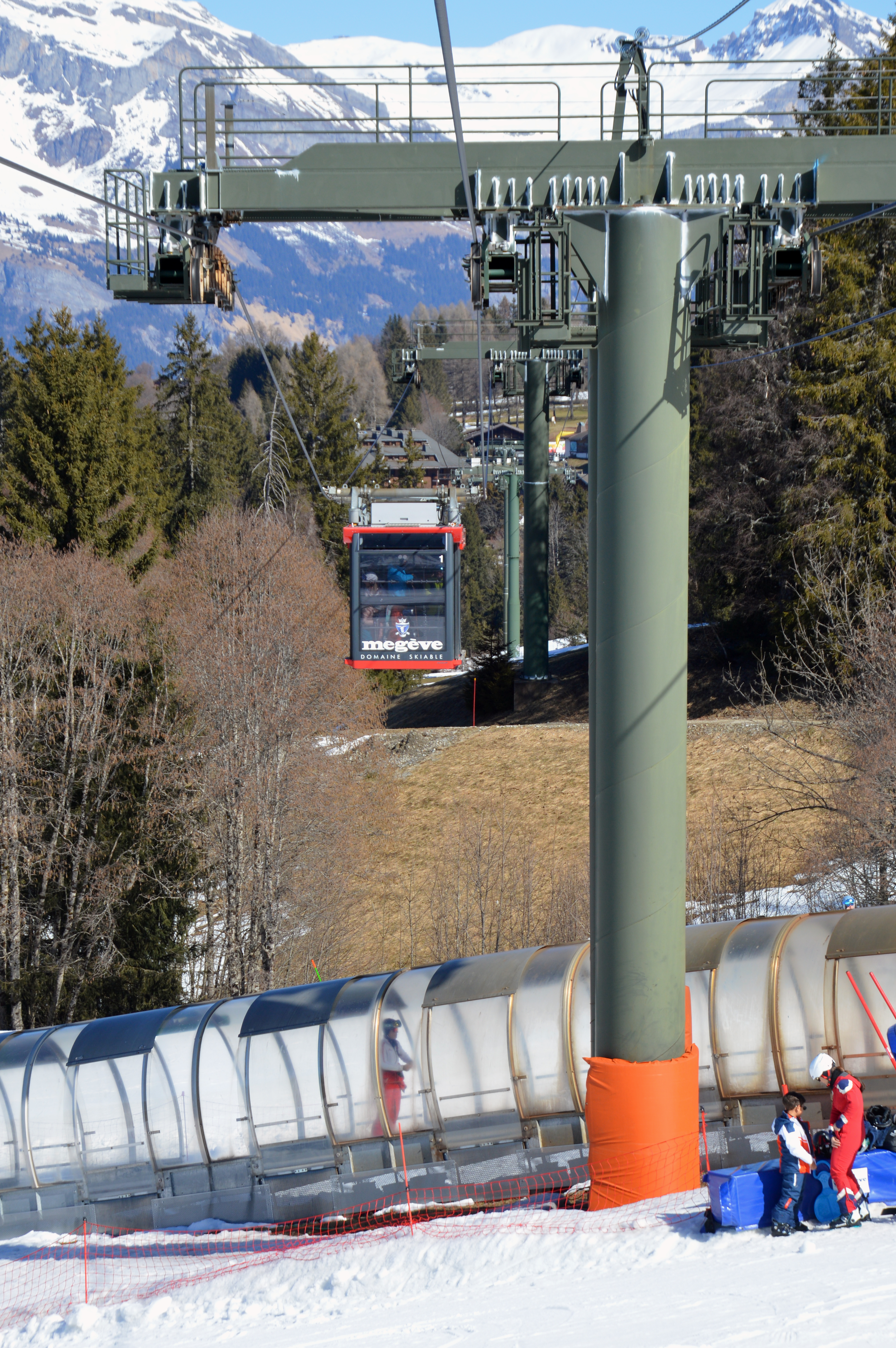
The reversible funitel Rocharbois in Megève

In 1985 Poma produced a reversible funitel in Megève, France. This system was originally referred to as a DMC lift, although it uses the configuration which would later become known as DLM. Unlike a modern funitel, the cable on this system does not move uninterruptedly. Instead, the system operates in a similar manner to an aerial tramway, with two large cabins shuttling back-and-forth. These cabins do not detach from the cable in normal operation. A similar system was built in 1993, in Montmorency Falls Park, Canada, by the French and Canadian subsidiaries of Doppelmayr.

In 2002, Poma installed a reversible funitel in Val Thorens, France. Instead of two large cabins, this system features two groups of three smaller cabins shuttling back-and-forth. A similar system was built by Doppelmayr in 2004, in Alpe d'Huez, France. Another similar system in Val Thorens was built by the Swiss manufacturer, Bartholet, in 2011.

== List of funitels ==
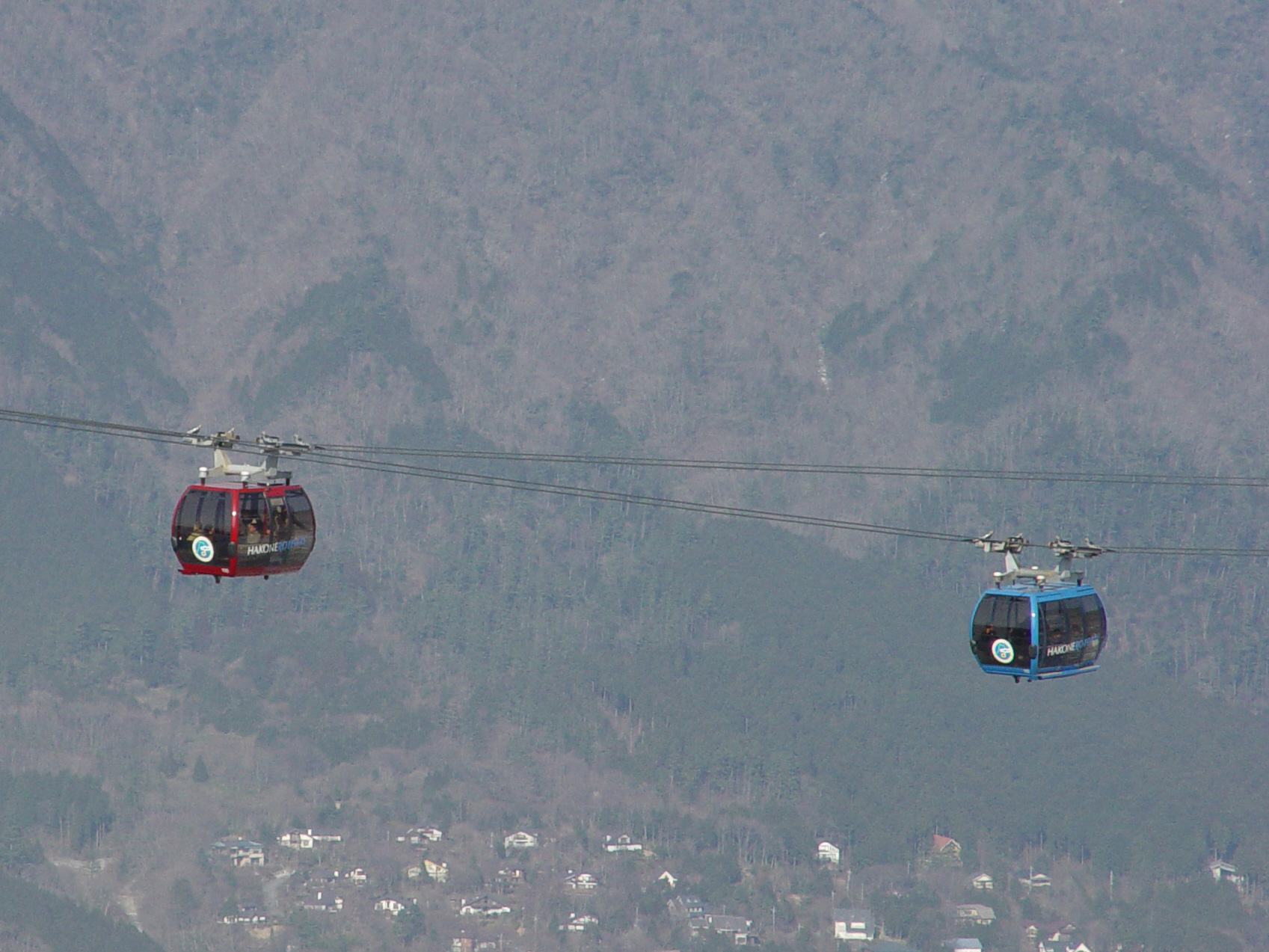
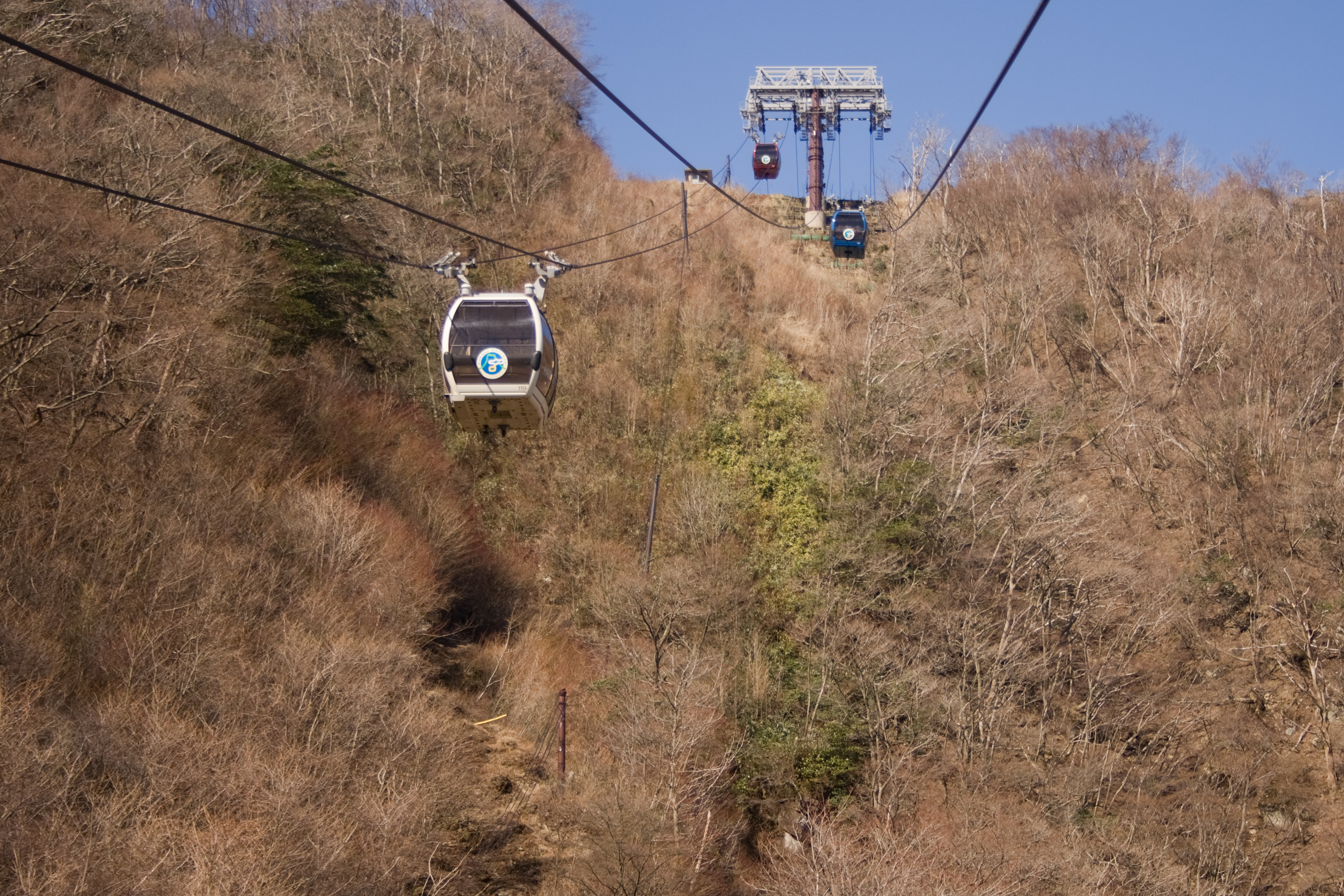
Hakone Ropeway in Japan

=== Andorra ===
- Encamp sector, Grandvalira ski resort

=== Austria ===
- St. Anton am Arlberg
- Ischgl
- Kitzsteinhorn (Kaprun)
- Hintertux

=== Canada ===
- Montmorency Falls, Quebec City

=== France ===
- Val-Thorens
- La Plagne: Built by Doppelmayr it runs from Plagne Centre (1970m) up to La Grande Rochette (2505m).
- L'Alpe d'Huez
- Super Besse
- Les Deux Alpes

=== Greece ===
- Athens: Parnitha Funitel

=== Japan ===
- Hashikurasan Ropeway, Miyoshi, Tokushima
- Hakone Ropeway, Hakone, Kanagawa
- Tanigawadake Ropeway, Tanigawadake Tenjindaira Ski Resort, Minakami, Gunma
- Zaō Ropeway, Yamagata Zaō Onsen Ski Resort, Yamagata, Yamagata

=== Slovakia ===
- Bratislava – used to transport cars in Volkswagen factory
- Jasná - ski resort

=== Switzerland ===
- Verbier
- Crans-Montana

=== United States ===
- Palisades Tahoe

== See also ==
- List of aerial lift manufacturers
- Lift Engineering (built the QMC funitel - a funitel that actually had four cables)
