= Hakone-Itabashi Station =

Railway station in Odawara, Kanagawa Prefecture, Japan

Coordinates: 35°14′43.59″N 139°8′41.30″E

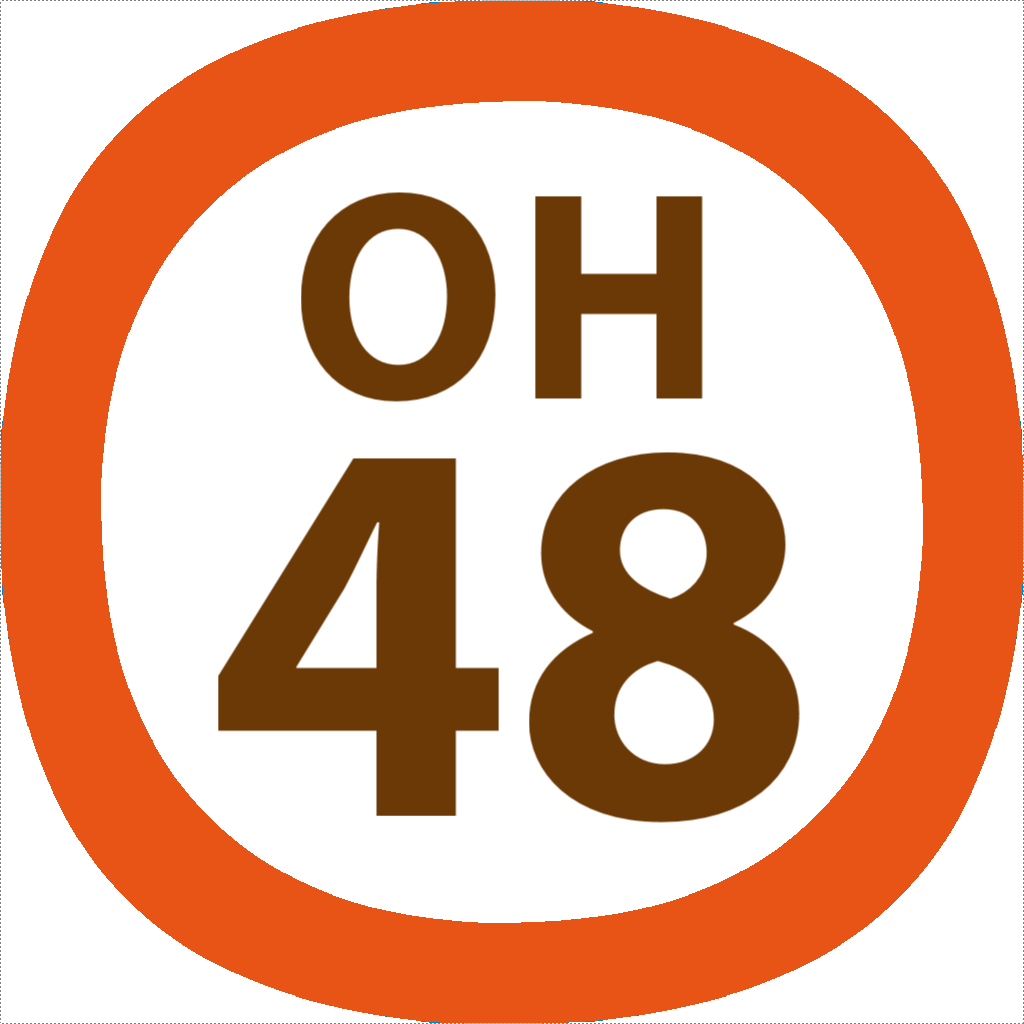
Hakone-Itabashi Station 箱根板橋駅

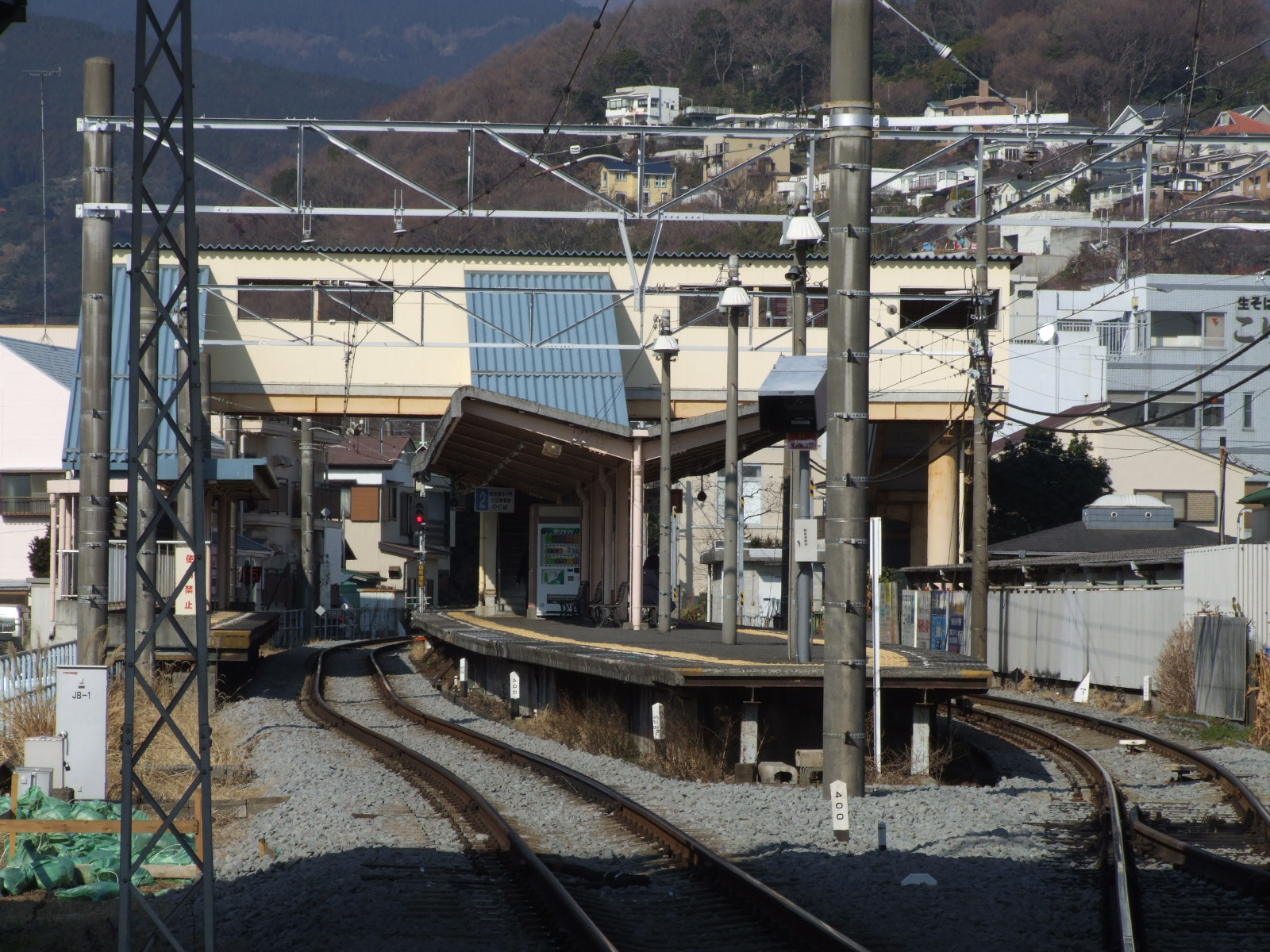
- Exterior of Hakone-Itabashi Station

General information
- Location: Itabashi-aze Yabuta 150-2, Odawara, Kanagawa （神奈川県小田原市板橋字薮田150-2） Japan
- Owner: Hakone Tozan Railway
- Operator: Odakyu Electric Railway
- Line: Hakone Tozan Line
- Connections: Bus stop

History
- Opened: 1935

Services
Preceding station	Odakyu	Following station
Kazamatsuri towards Hakone-Yumoto	Hakone Tozan Line Local	Odawara Terminus
Location

Hakone-Itabashi Station (箱根板橋駅, Hakone-Itabashi-eki) is a railway station on the Hakone Tozan Line located in Odawara, Kanagawa Prefecture, Japan. It is 1.7 rail kilometers from the line's terminus at Odawara Station.

== History ==
Hakone-Itabashi Station was opened on 10 October 1935, when the Hakone Tozan Railway (founded 1928) changed its Odawara - Hakone-Yumoto tram line to a railway.

Station numbering was introduced in January 2014 with Hakone-Itabashi being assigned station number OH48.

On 1 April 2024, operations of the station came under the aegis of Odakyu Hakone resulting from restructuring of Odakyu Group operations in the Hakone area.

== Lines ==
- Hakone Tozan Railway
  - Hakone Tozan Line

== Building ==
Hakone-Itabashi station has an island platform and a side platform serving three tracks; however, the side platform is not in use.

=== Platforms ===
1	■ Hakone Tozan Line	for Hakone-Yumoto; Change trains at Hakone-Yumoto for Gōra
2	■ Hakone Tozan Line	for Odawara and Shinjuku

== Bus services ==
- Hakone Tozan Bus
  - "H" line for Hakone Machi Ko (Lake Ashi) via Hakone Yumoto Station, Miyanoshita, Kowakidani Station, Kowaki-en, Moto Hakone Ko (Hakone Shrine), Hakone Checkpoint
  - "T" line for Togendai (Lake Ashi) via Hakone Yumoto Station, Miyanoshita, Sengoku (transfer for JR Gotemba Station & Gotemba Premium Outlets)
  - for Odawara Station
- Izu Hakone Bus
  - "J" & "Z" lines for Hakone Checkpoint (Lake Ashi) via Hakone Yumoto Station, Miyanoshita, Kowakidani Station, Kowaki-en, Moto Hakone (Hakone Shrine), Kojiri
  - for Odawara Station
