= Kazamatsuri Station =

Railway station in Odawara, Kanagawa Prefecture, Japan

Coordinates: 35°14′46.54″N 139°7′44.72″E

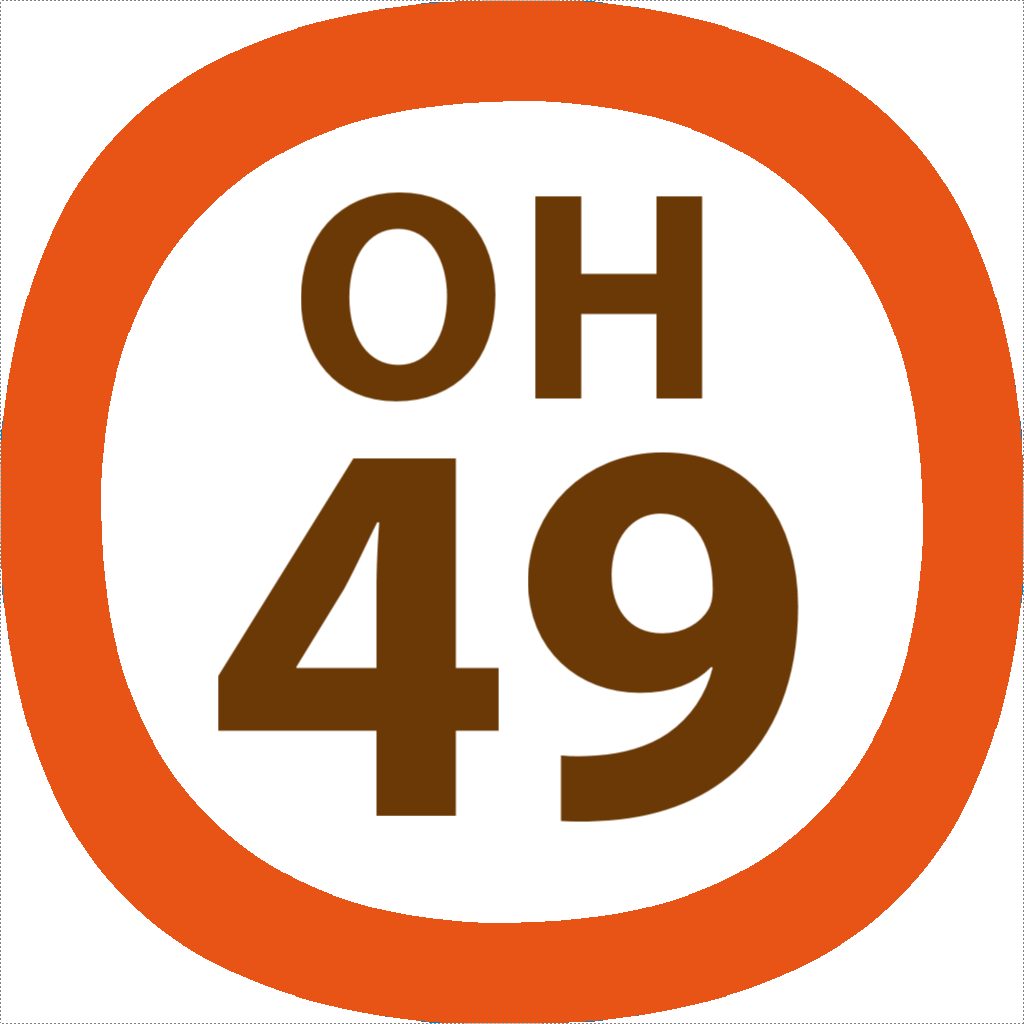
Kazamatsuri Station 風祭駅

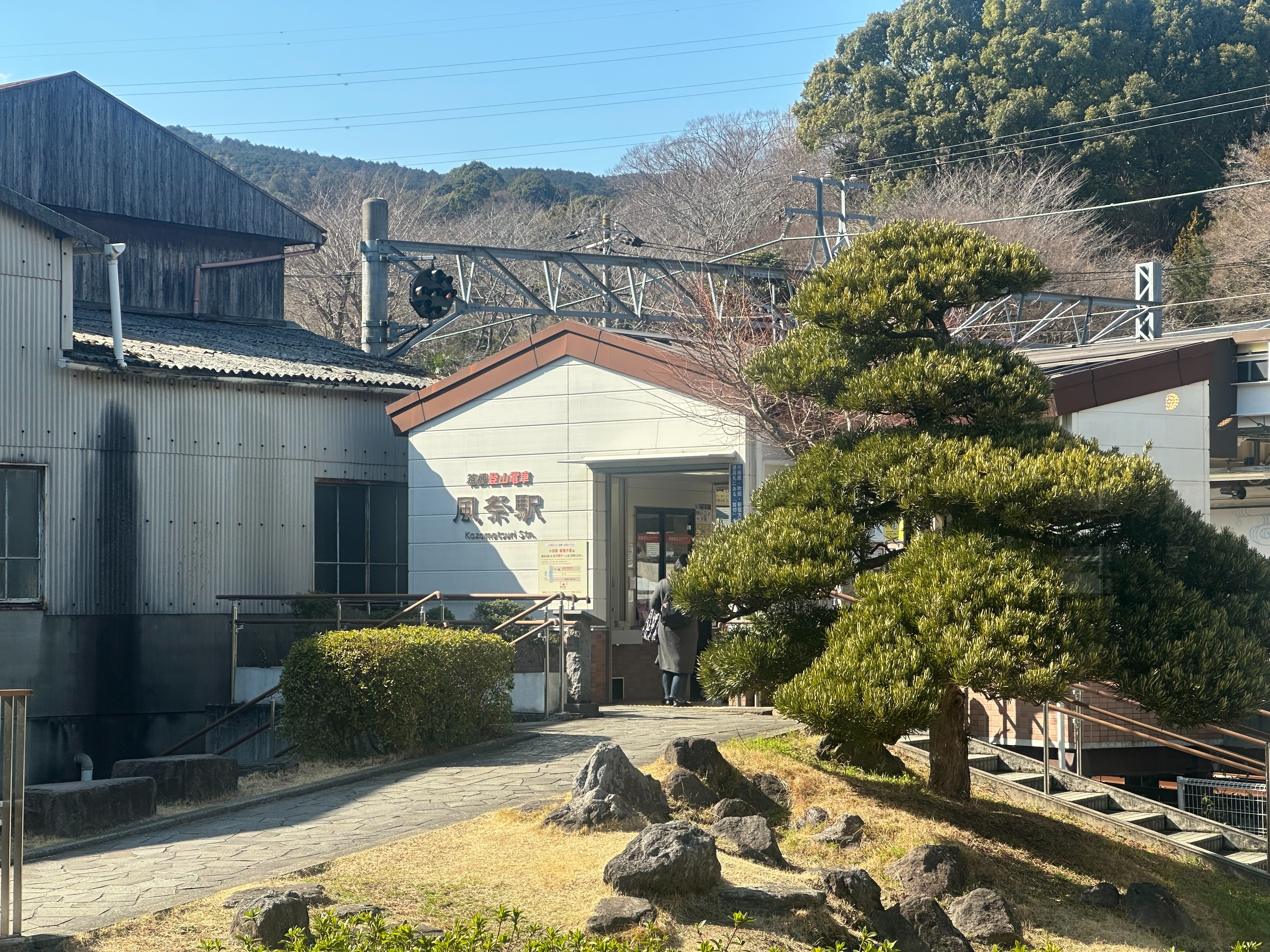
- Kazamatsuri Station Exterior, 2025

General information
- Location: Kazamatsuri aza Nakase 240-2, Odawara, Kanagawa （神奈川県小田原市風祭字中瀬240-2） Japan
- Owner: Hakone Tozan Railway
- Operator: Odakyu Electric Railway
- Line: Hakone Tozan Line
- Connections: Bus stop

History
- Opened: 1935

Services
Preceding station	Odakyu	Following station
Iriuda towards Hakone-Yumoto	Hakone Tozan Line Local	Hakone-Itabashi towards Odawara
Location

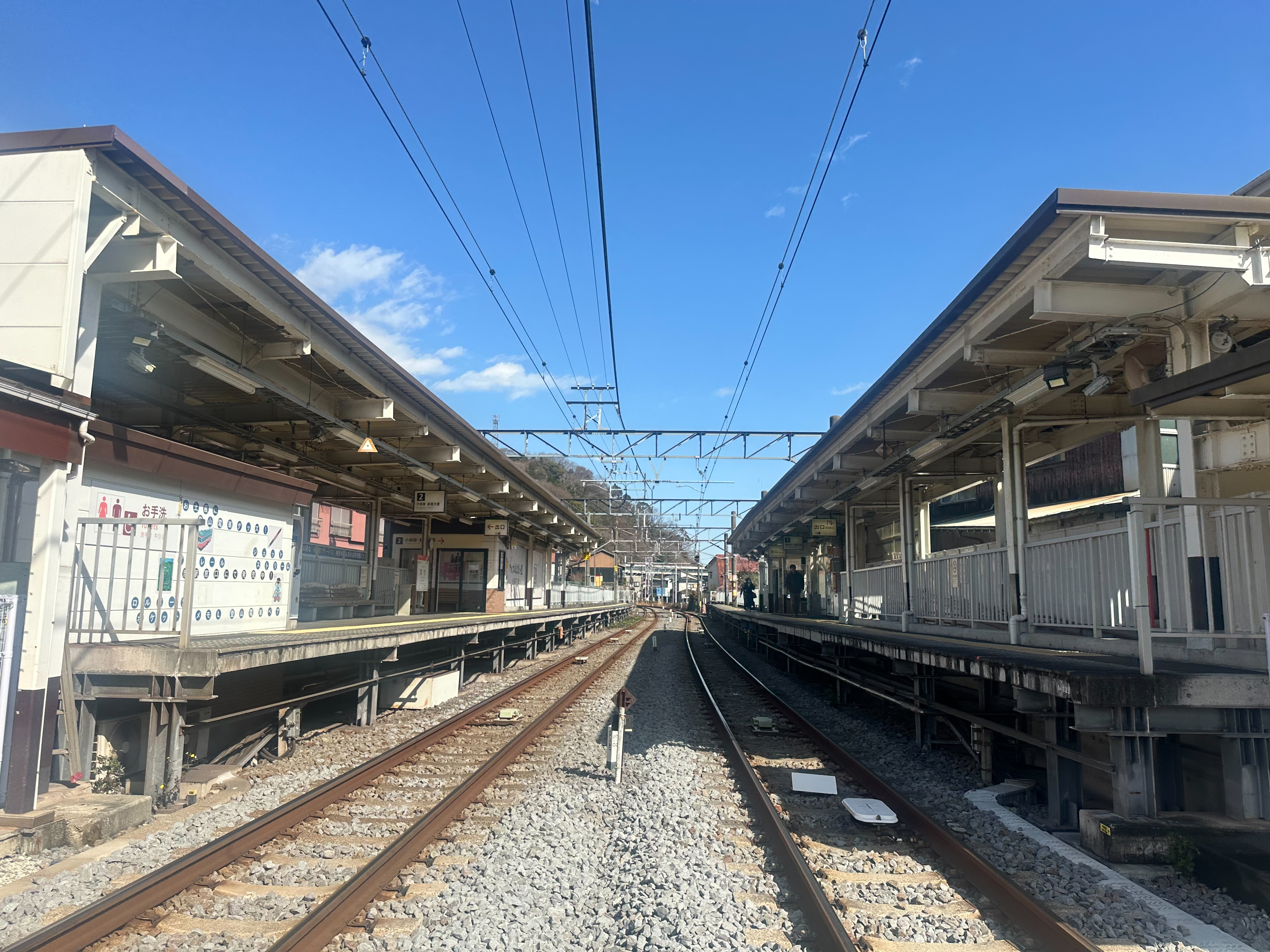
Platforms

Kazamatsuri Station (風祭駅, Kazamatsuri-eki) is a railway station on the Hakone Tozan Line located in Odawara, Kanagawa Prefecture, Japan. It is 3.2 rail kilometers from the line's terminus at Odawara Station.

== History ==
Kazamatsuri Station was opened on 10 October 1935, when the Hakone Tozan Railway (founded 1928) changed its tram line, Odawawa - Hakone-Yumoto, to a railway. The station was completely reconstructed in 2007–2008.

Station numbering was introduced in January 2014 with Kazamatsuri being assigned station number OH49.

On 1 April 2024, operations of the station came under the support of Odakyu Hakone resulting from the restructuring of Odakyu Group operations in the Hakone area.

== Lines ==
- Hakone Tozan Railway
  - Hakone Tozan Line

== Building ==
Kazamatsuri Station previously had a single island platform, but this was replaced with two opposed side platforms in its 2007-2008 reconstruction.

=== Platforms ===
1	■ Hakone Tozan Line	for Hakone-Yumoto; Change trains at Hakone-Yumoto for Gōra
2	■ Hakone Tozan Line	for Odawara and Shinjuku

== Bus services ==
- Hakone Tozan Bus
  - "H" line for Hakone Machi Ko (Lake Ashi) via Hakone Yumoto Station, Miyanoshita, Kowakidani Station, Kowaki-en, Moto Hakone Ko (Hakone Shrine), Hakone Checkpoint
  - "T" line for Togendai (Lake Ashi) via Hakone Yumoto Station, Miyanoshita, Sengoku (transfer for JR Gotemba Station & Gotemba Premium Outlets)
  - for Odawara Station
- Izu Hakone Bus
  - "J" & "Z" lines for Hakone Checkpoint (Lake Ashi) via Hakone Yumoto Station, Miyanoshita, Kowakidani Station, Kowaki-en, Moto Hakone (Hakone Shrine), Kojiri
  - for Odawara Station
