= Iriuda Station =

Railway station in Odawara, Kanagawa Prefecture, Japan

Coordinates: 35°14′27.20″N 139°7′15.85″E

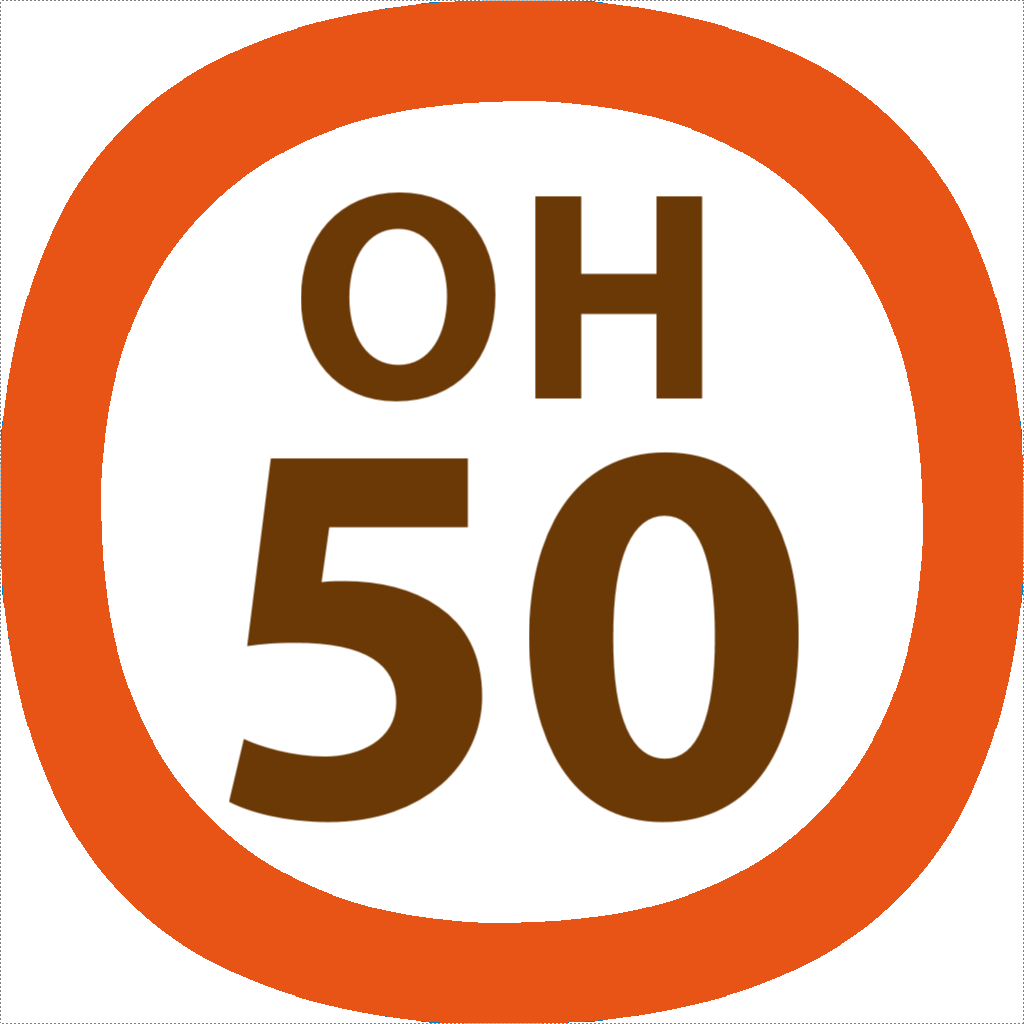
Iriuda Station 入生田駅

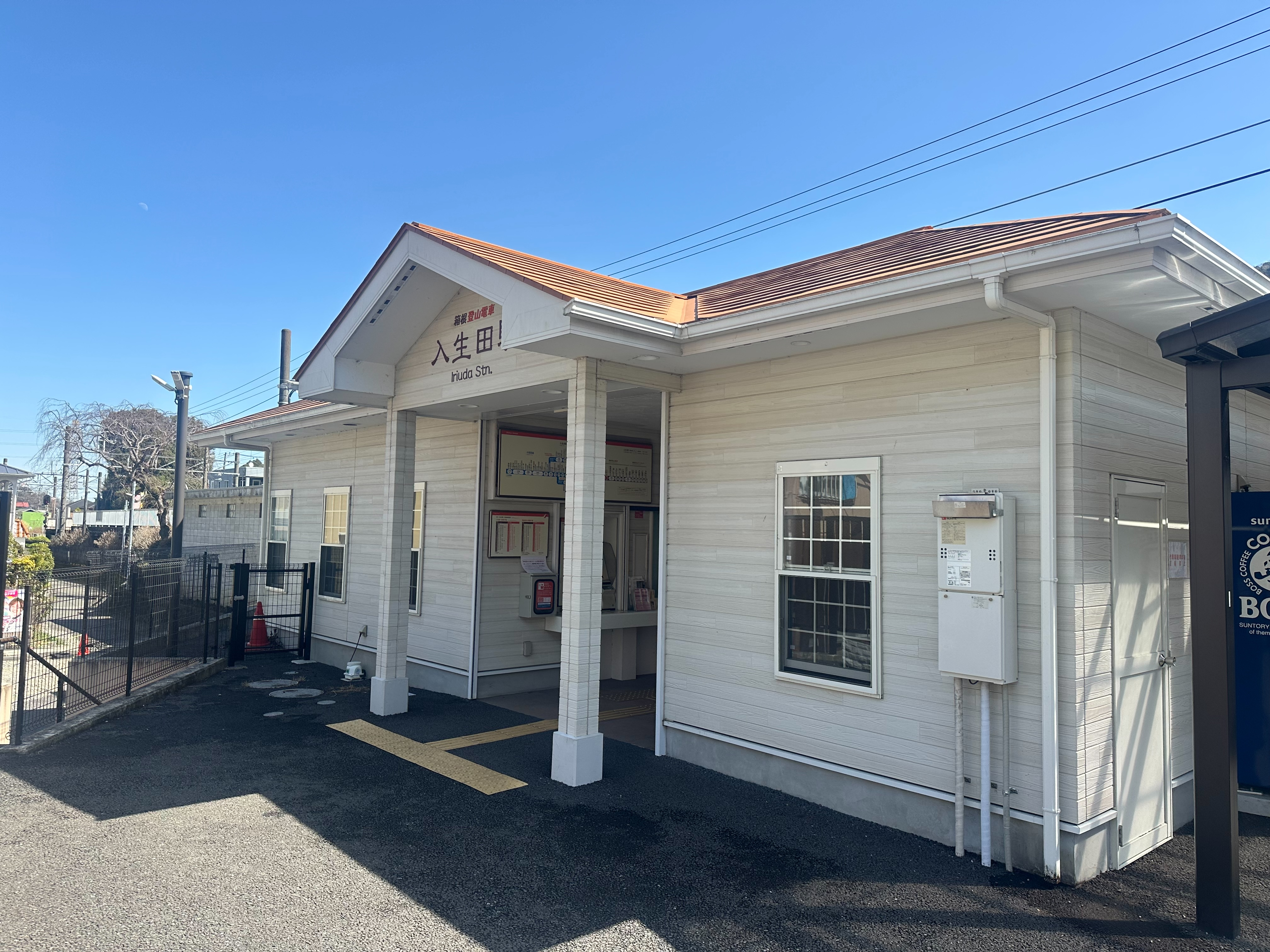
- Exterior of Iriuda Station, 2025

General information
- Location: Iriuda-aze Matsuba 190-4, Odawara, Kanagawa （神奈川県小田原市入生田字松葉190-4） Japan
- Owner: Hakone Tozan Railway
- Operator: Odakyu Electric Railway
- Line: Hakone Tozan Line
- Connections: Bus stop

History
- Opened: 1935

Services
Preceding station	Odakyu	Following station
Hakone-Yumoto Terminus	Hakone Tozan Line Local	Kazamatsuri towards Odawara
Location

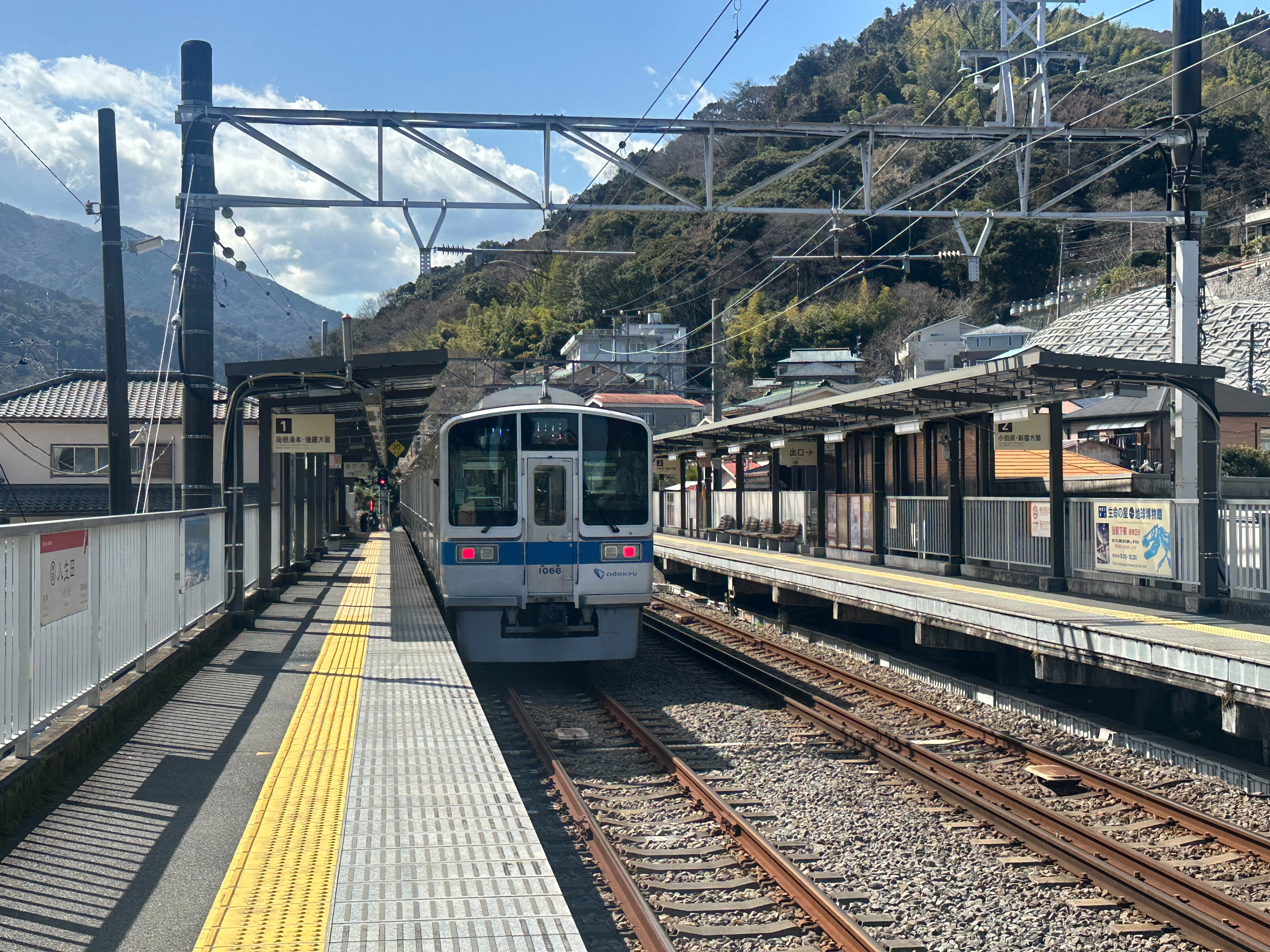
Platforms

Iriuda Station (入生田駅, Iriuda-eki) is a railway station on the Hakone Tozan Line located in Odawara, Kanagawa Prefecture, Japan. It is 4.2 rail kilometers from the line's terminus at Odawara Station.

== History ==
Iriuda station was opened on 10 October 1935, when the Hakone Tozan Railway (founded 1928) changed its Odawara - Hakone-Yumoto tram line to a railway.

Station numbering was introduced in January 2014 with Iriuda being assigned station number OH50.

== Lines ==
- Hakone Tozan Railway
  - Hakone Tozan Line

== Building ==
Iriuda station has two opposed side platforms.

=== Platforms ===
1	■ Hakone Tozan Line	to Hakone-Yumoto; Change trains at Hakone-Yumoto for Gōra
2	■ Hakone Tozan Line	for Odawara and Shinjuku

== Bus services ==
- Hakone Tozan Bus
  - "H" line for Hakone Machi Ko (Lake Ashi) via Hakone Yumoto Station, Miyanoshita, Kowakidani Station, Kowaki-en, Moto Hakone Ko (Hakone Shrine), Hakone Checkpoint
  - "T" line for Togendai (Lake Ashi) via Hakone Yumoto Station, Miyanoshita, Sengoku (transfer for JR Gotemba Station & Gotemba Premium Outlets)
  - for Odawara Station
- Izu Hakone Bus
  - "J" & "Z" lines for Hakone Checkpoint (Lake Ashi) via Hakone Yumoto Station, Miyanoshita, Kowakidani Station, Kowaki-en, Moto Hakone (Hakone Shrine), Kojiri
  - for Odawara Station
