= Ōhiradai Station =

Railway station in Hakone, Kanagawa Prefecture, Japan

Coordinates: 35°14′19.86″N 139°4′25.96″E

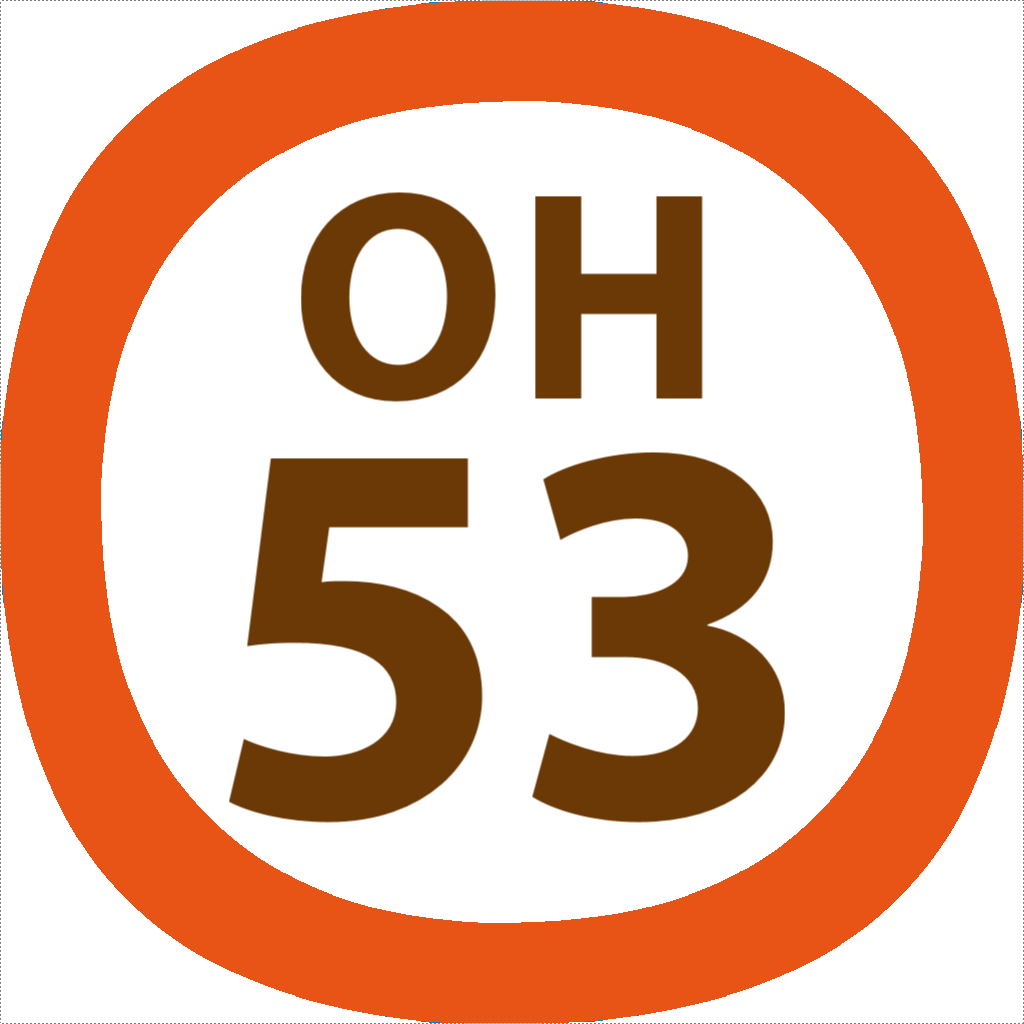
Ōhiradai Station 大平台駅

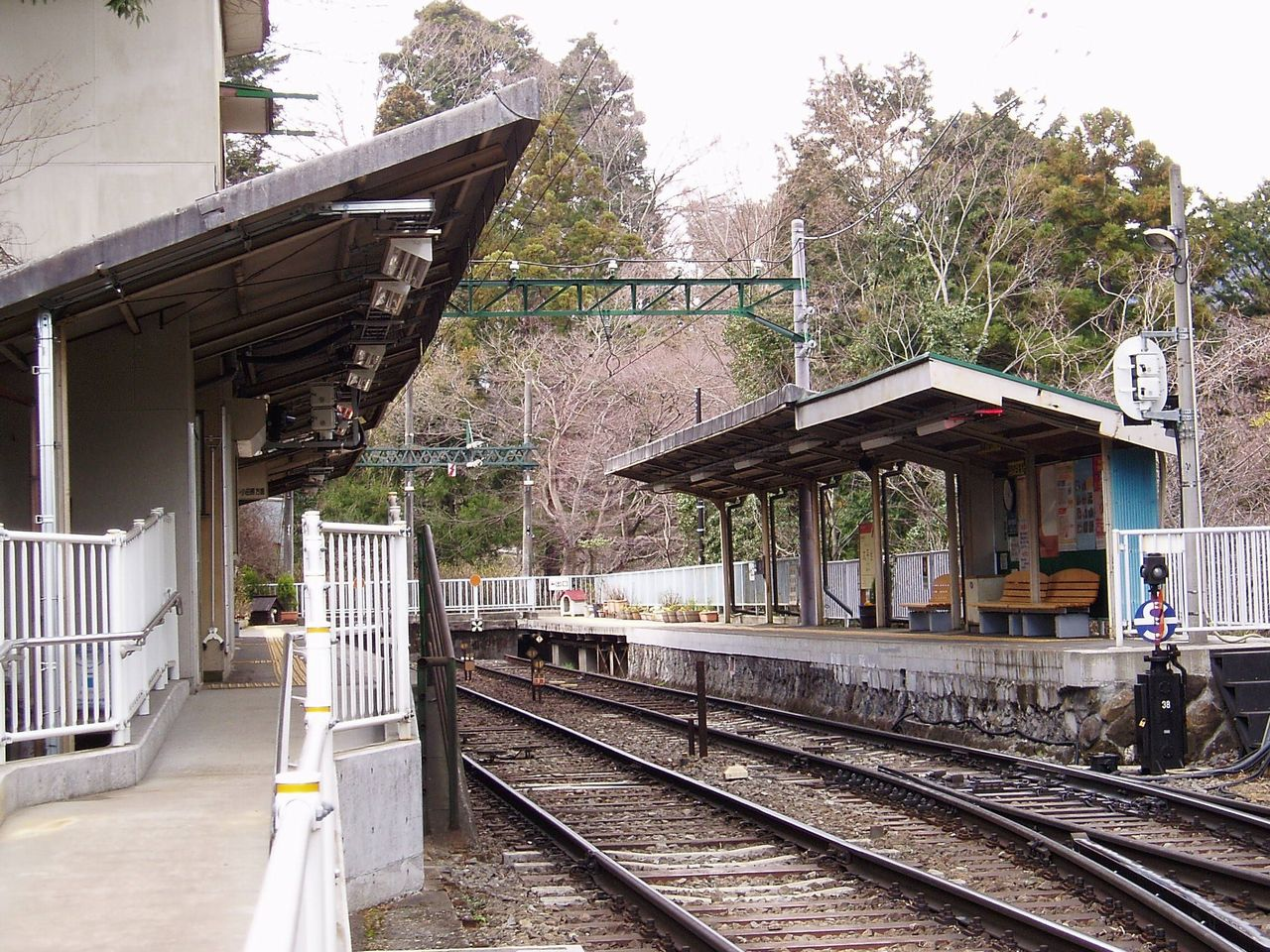
- Ōhiradai Station, March 2007

General information
- Location: Ōhiradai, Hakone, Ashigarashimo, Kanagawa （神奈川県足柄下郡箱根町大平台） Japan
- Operator: Hakone Tozan Railway
- Line: Hakone Tozan Line
- Connections: Bus stop

History
- Opened: 1919

Services
Preceding station	Odakyu Hakone	Following station
Miyanoshita towards Gōra	Hakone Tozan Line	Tōnosawa towards Hakone-Yumoto
Location

Ōhiradai Station (大平台駅, Ōhiradai-eki) is a railway station on the Hakone Tozan Line in Hakone, Kanagawa, Japan, operated by the private railway operator Hakone Tozan Railway. The station is located on a switchback.

== Lines ==
Ōhiradai Station is served by the Hakone Tozan Line. It is 9.9 km from the official starting point of the line at Odawara Station.

== Station layout ==
Ōhiradai Station has two opposed side platforms. The small station building is built on one of the platforms.

=== Platforms ===
1	■ Hakone Tozan Line	for Gōra
2	■ Hakone Tozan Line	for Hakone-Yumoto and Odawara

== History ==
Ōhiradai Station opened on 1 June 1919.

On 1 April 2024, operations of the station came under the aegis of Odakyu Hakone resulting from restructuring of Odakyu Group operations in the Hakone area.

== Bus services ==
- Hakone Tozan Bus
  - "H" line for Hakone Machi Ko (Lake Ashi) via Miyanoshita, Kowakidani Station, Kowaki-en, Moto Hakone Ko (Hakone Shrine: Transfer for Sightseeing Cruise), Hakone Checkpoint
  - "T" line for Togendai (Lake Ashi: Transfer for Sightseeing Cruise) via Miyanoshita, Venetian Glass Museum, Sengoku (Transfer for Gotemba Premium Outlets and JR Gotemba Station; a gateway station for Mount Fuji and Fuji Five Lakes, including Lake Kawaguchi and Lake Yamanaka), Kawamukai (The Little Prince and Saint-Exupéry Museum), Senkyoro-mae (Transfer for Pola Museum of Art), Sengoku-kogen
  - "H" & "T" line For Hakone Yumoto Station, Odawara Station
- Izu Hakone Bus
  - "J" line for Kojiri via Miyanoshita, Kowakidani Station, Kowaki-en, Ōwakudani
  - "Z" line for Hakone Checkpoint via Miyanoshita, Kowakidani Station, Kowaki-en, Moto Hakone (Hakone Shrine)
  - "J" & "Z" line for Hakone Yumoto Station, Odawara Station
