= Kanagawa Prefectural Museum of Natural History =

Museum in Kanagawa Prefecture, Japan

- 神奈川県立生命の星・地球博物館
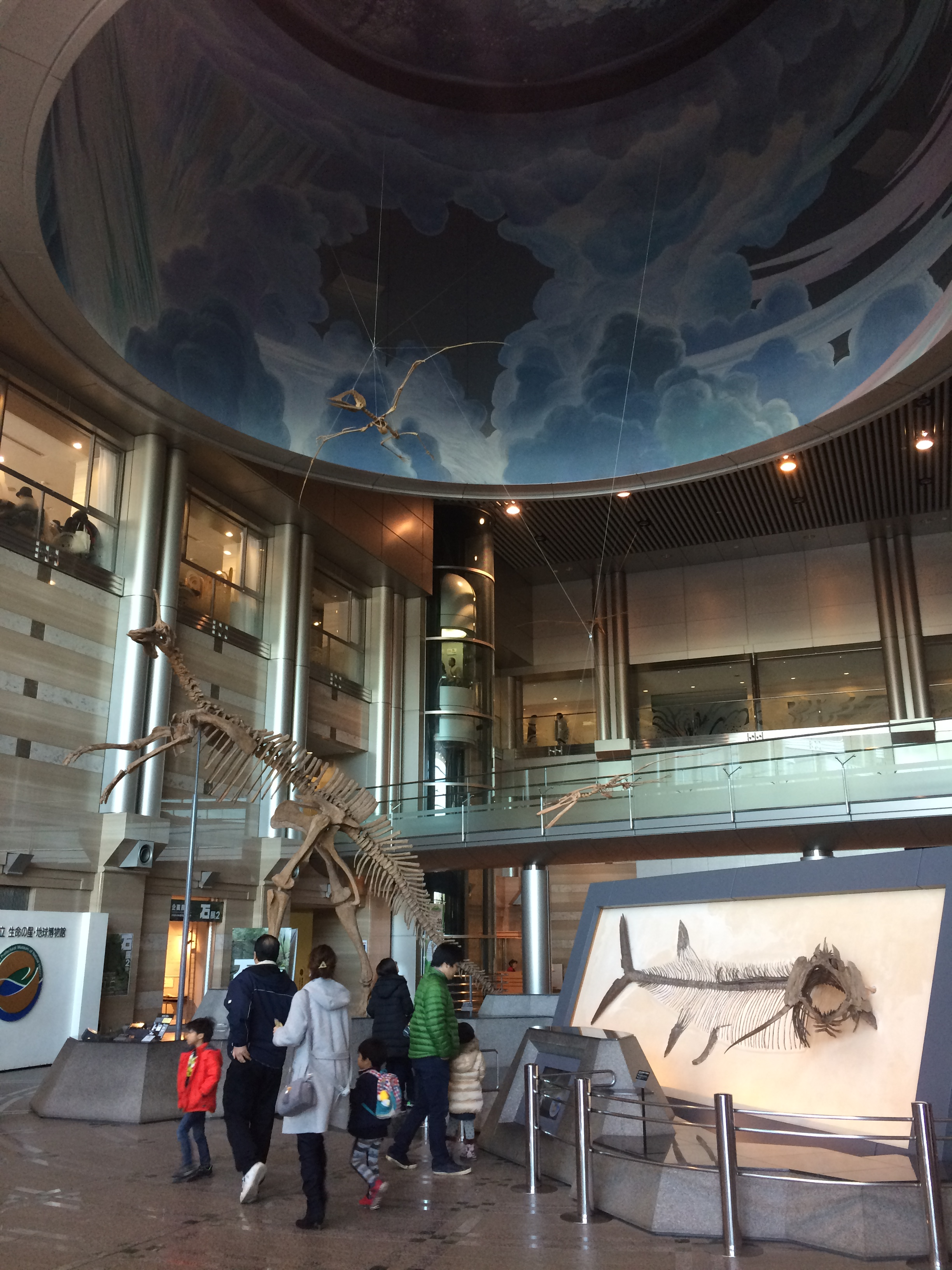
- Established: 1995
- Location: 499 Iryuda, Odawara, Kanagawa Prefecture 250-0031, Japan
- Coordinates: 35.239222°N 139.12125°E
- Type: Natural history museum
- Public transit access: Iriuda Station, Hakone Tozan Line
- Website: [url=https://nh.kanagawa-museum.jp/www/contents/1001000000003/index.html nh.kanagawa-museum.jp/..]

The Kanagawa Prefectural Museum of Natural History (神奈川県立生命の星・地球博物館, Kanagawa kenritsu seimei no hoshi chikyū hakubutsukan) is a natural history museum in the city of Odawara in Kanagawa Prefecture, Japan. The museum has an extensive geology section, and focuses on the flora and fauna of Kanagawa prefecture.

The museum is open from 9:00 to 4:30, and closed on Mondays and the second Tuesday of the month (except national holidays, when they close the day after), and during the New Year's period.
