= Tōnosawa Station =

Railway station in Hakone, Kanagawa Prefecture, Japan

Coordinates: 35°14′3.96″N 139°5′38.58″E

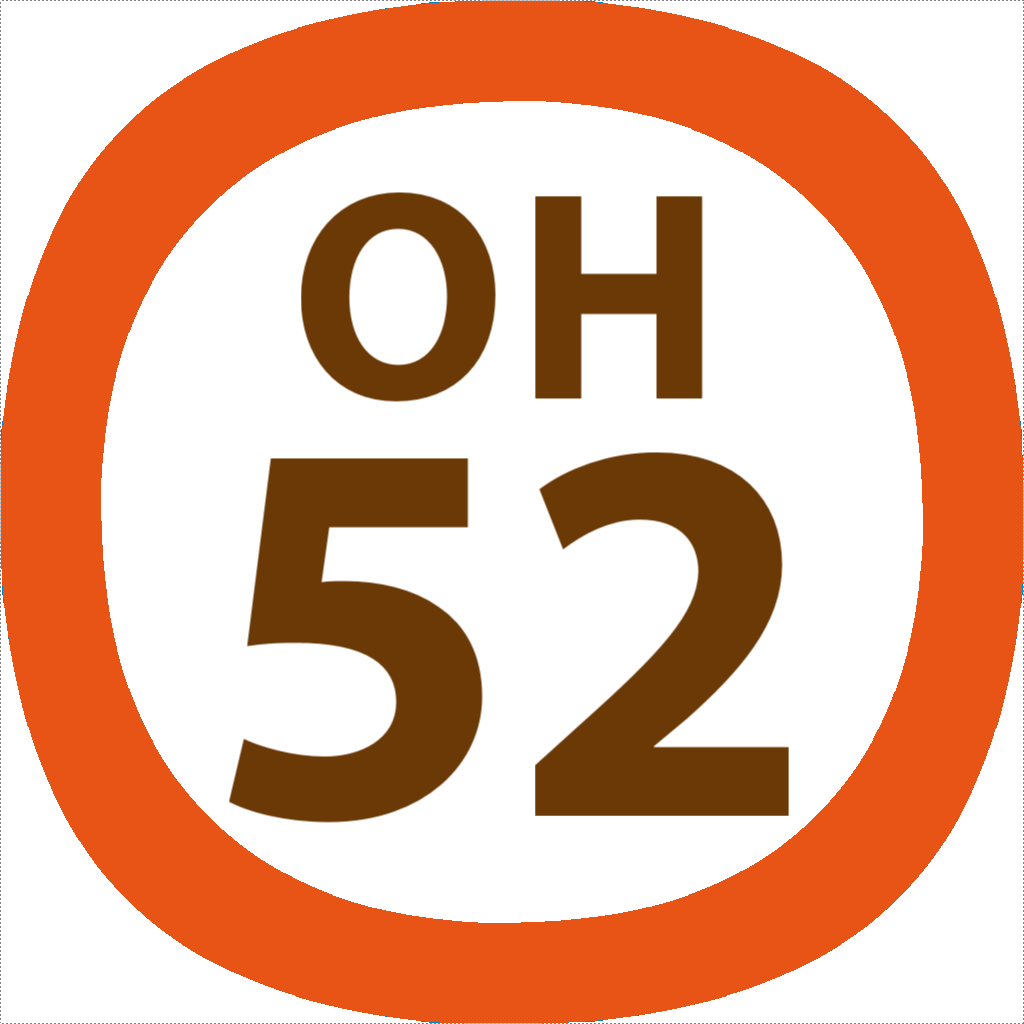
Tōnosawa Station 塔ノ沢駅

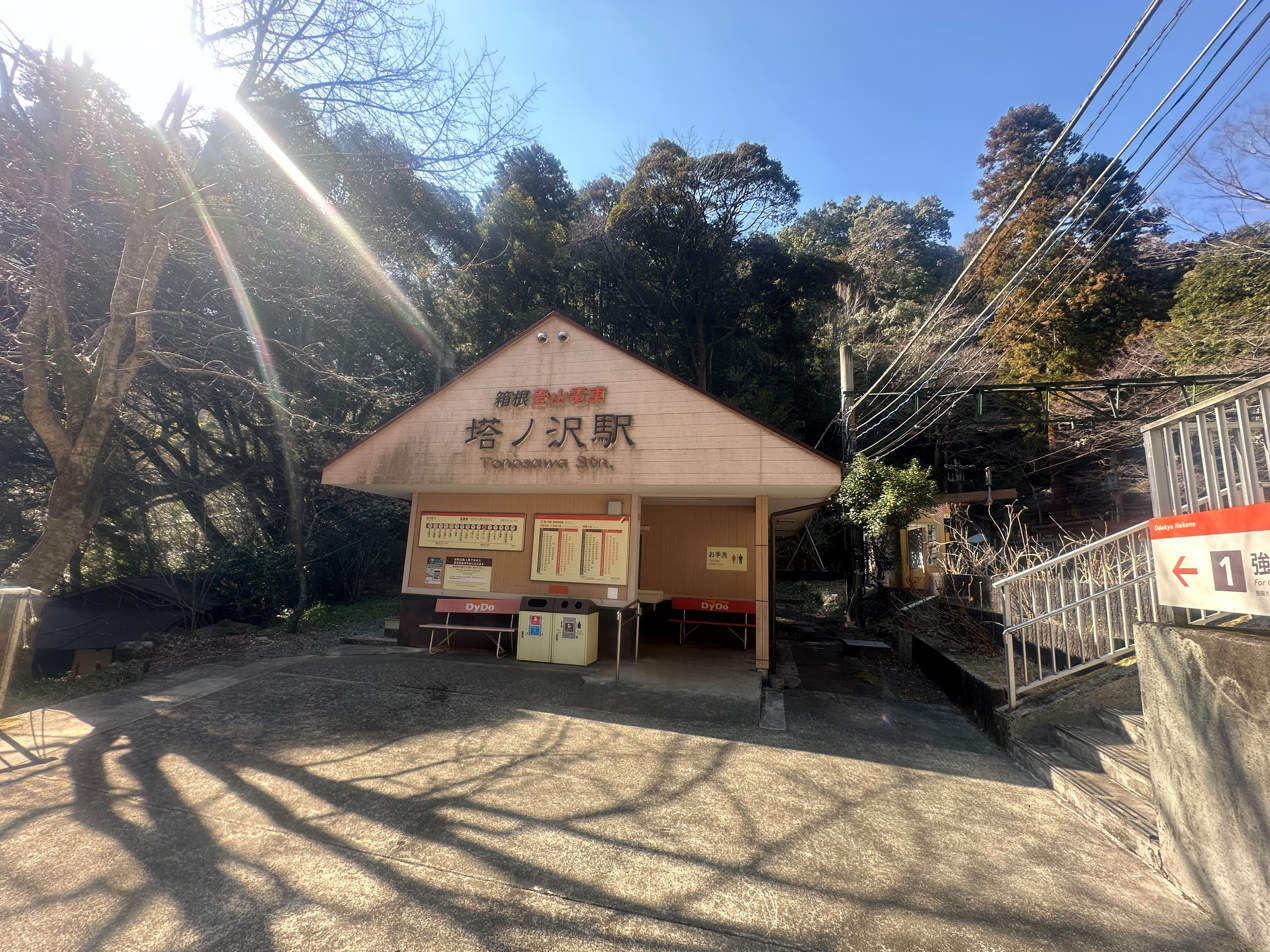
- Exterior of Tōnosawa Station

General information
- Location: Tōnosawa, Hakone, Ashigarashimo, Kanagawa （神奈川県足柄下郡箱根町塔之 澤恵ケ平４６－２） Japan
- Operator: Hakone Tozan Railway
- Line: Hakone Tozan Line

History
- Opened: 1920

Services
Preceding station	Odakyu Hakone	Following station
Ōhiradai towards Gōra	Hakone Tozan Line	Hakone-Yumoto Terminus
Location

Tōnosawa Station (塔ノ沢駅, Tōnosawa-eki) is a railway station on the Hakone Tozan Line located in Hakone, Kanagawa Prefecture, Japan. It is 7.1 rail kilometers from the line's terminus at Odawara Station.

== History ==
Tōnosawa Station was opened on 21 October 1920.

On 1 April 2024, operations of the station came under the aegis of Odakyu Hakone resulting from restructuring of Odakyu Group operations in the Hakone area.

== Lines ==
- Hakone Tozan Railway
  - Hakone Tozan Line

== Building ==
Tōnosawa Station has two opposed side platforms. The station abuts a tunnel on both ends, and the platforms can accommodate three-car long trains. Due to lack of space, the switchpoint is located within the tunnel.

=== Platforms ===
1	■ Hakone Tozan Line	Westbound (For Gōra)
2	■ Hakone Tozan Line	Eastbound (For Hakone-Yumoto, Odawara)

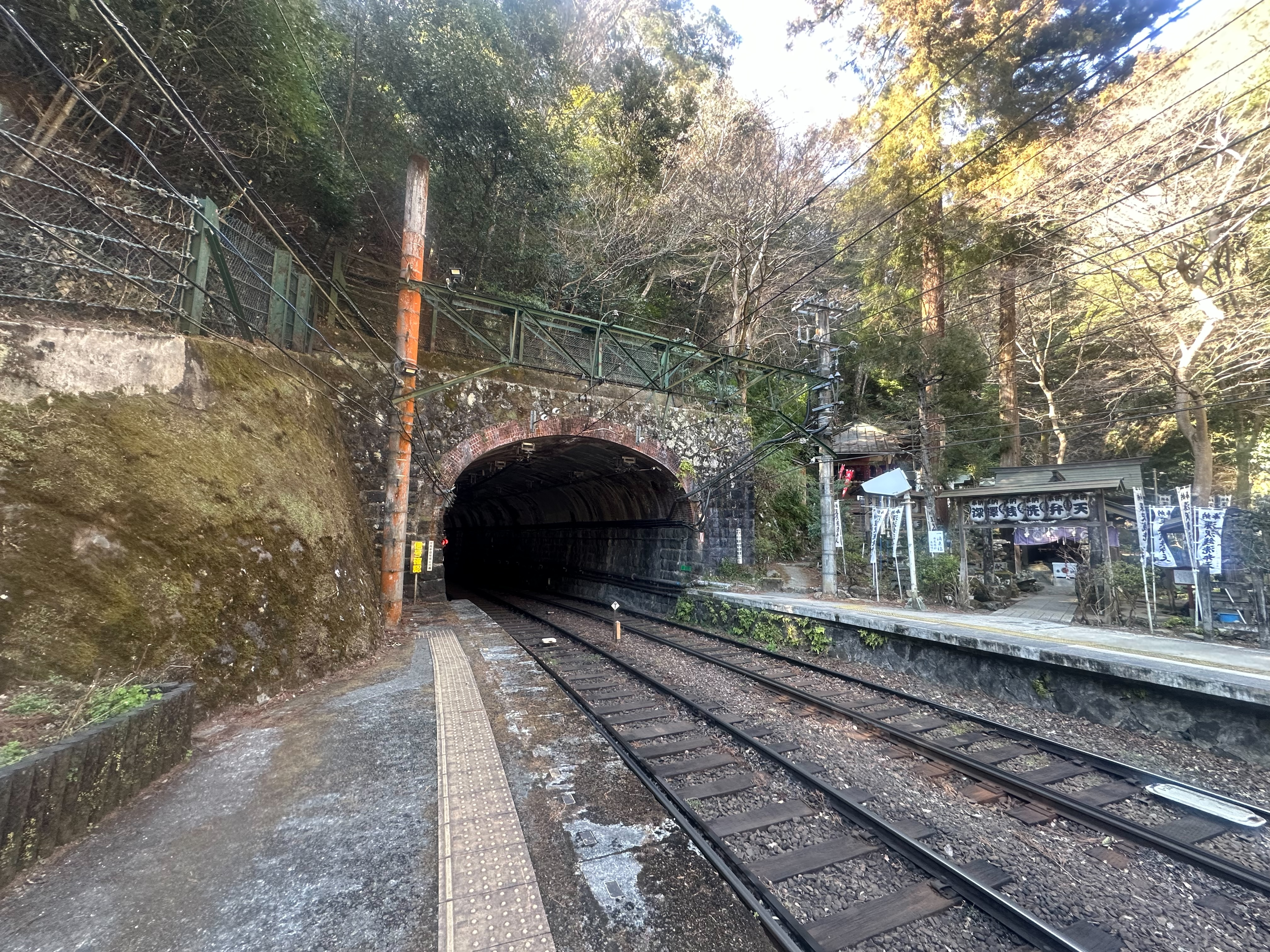
Platforms, 2025
