= Odakyu 5000 series =

Odakyu 5000 series may refer to:

- Odakyu 5000 series (1969)
- Odakyu 5000 series (2019)
