= Hakone Tozan Line =

Mountain railway in Japan

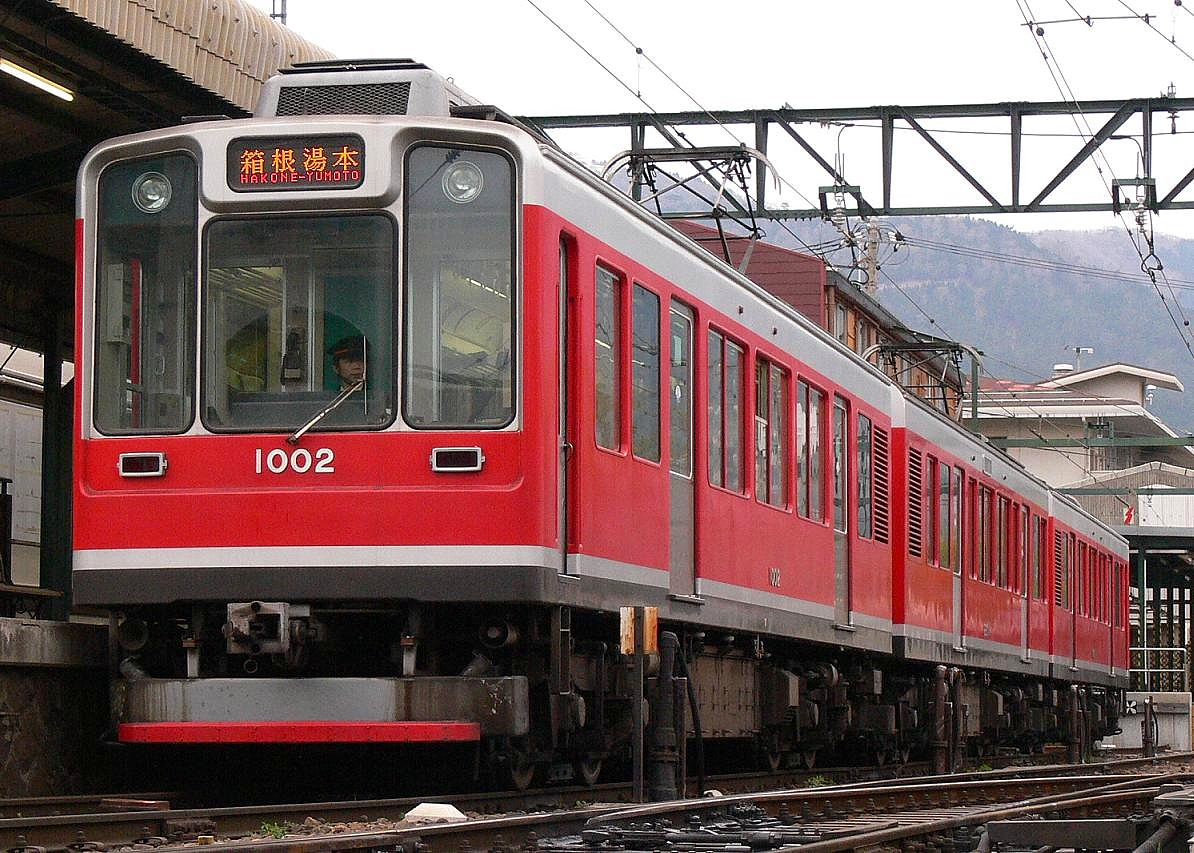
- Hakone Tozan Railway 1000 series trainset "Bernina" at Gōra Station

Overview
- Native name: 箱根登山鉄道線
- Status: In service
- Owner: Odakyu Group
- Locale: Kanagawa Prefecture, Japan
- Termini: Odawara; Gōra
- Stations: 11

Service
- System: Hakone Tozan Railway
- Operator: Odakyu Hakone
- Depot: Iriuda

History
- Opened: 1 June 1919; 107 years ago

Technical
- Line length: 15.0 km (9.3 mi)
- Number of tracks: 1, with passing loops
- Track gauge: Gōra–Iriuda: 1,435 mm (4 ft 8 1/2 in) standard gauge; Hakone-Yumoto–Odawara: 1,067 mm (3 ft 6 in)
- Minimum radius: 169 m (555 ft)
- Electrification: Overhead line: Gōra–Iriuda: 750 V DC; Hakone-Yumoto–Odawara: 1,500 V DC
- Signalling: Automatic closed block
- Train protection system: D-ATS-P
- Highest elevation: 553 m (1,814 ft)
- Maximum incline: 8%

The Hakone Tozan Line (Japanese: 箱根登山鉄道線, Hepburn: Hakone Tozan Tetsudō-sen; lit. 'Hakone Mountain-Climbing Railroad Line') is a mountain railway in Kanagawa Prefecture, Japan. It is operated by Odakyu Hakone, an Odakyu Group company that also operates the Hakone Tozan Cable Car, Hakone Ropeway and Hakone Sightseeing Cruise.

Although presented as a single railway line, the Hakone Tozan Line operates as two distinct sections with different technical and operational characteristics. The lower section, between Odawara and Hakone-Yumoto stations, is operated exclusively by through trains of the Odakyū Odawara Line using conventional Japanese narrow-gauge rolling stock. The upper mountain section, between Hakone-Yumoto and Gōra station, is operated by Hakone Tozan Railway trains built to standard gauge and specially designed for steep gradients and sharp curves. Passengers must change trains at Hakone-Yumoto.

== History ==
The origins of the Hakone Tozan Line date to October 1, 1888, when the Odawara Horse-drawn Railway opened a line from Kōzu Station via Odawara Station to Hakone-Yumoto Station. The operating company was renamed Odawara Electric Railway on October 31, 1896, and the line was electrified on March 21, 1900, operating as a tramway at 600 V DC.

Mountain railway operations began on June 1, 1919, when an electrified (600 V DC) line opened between Hakone-Yumoto and Gōra Station, enabling rail access deeper into the Hakone mountains. On December 16, 1920, the tramway section between Kōzu and Odawara was closed, with the line instead connecting to the Japanese Government Railways (now JR) Tōkaidō Main Line at Odawara. Hakone Tozan Railway was formally established as a company on August 16, 1928.

On October 1, 1935, the mainline railway was extended from Hakone-Yumoto to Odawara, while the remaining tram section between Odawara and Hakone-Itabashi Station was retained as the Odawara Town Line. This tram section was renamed the Odawara City Line on December 20, 1940, and was ultimately abandoned on June 1, 1956. Hakone Tozan Railway became part of the Odakyu Group on June 1, 1948.

Through services between Tokyo and Hakone were introduced on August 1, 1950, when Odakyu Electric Railway began operating Limited Express and Express trains from Shinjuku Station to Hakone-Yumoto. To accommodate through operation alongside mountain railway rolling stock, the Odawara–Hakone-Yumoto section was converted to dual gauge, and its electrification voltage was increased to 1,500 V DC.

Modernization of the mountain section continued on July 14, 1993, when the Hakone-Yumoto–Gōra segment was uprated from 600 to 750 V DC, enabling operation with longer three-car electric multiple units. A major operational change occurred on March 18, 2006, when Hakone Tozan Railway discontinued the use of its own rolling stock between Odawara and Hakone-Yumoto. Most of the dual-gauge track was removed at that time, leaving only the short section between Iriuda Station and Hakone-Yumoto to allow standard-gauge mountain trains access to Iriuda Depot. On March 15, 2008, a new Odakyu "Romancecar" through service to Kita-Senju Station was introduced.

The mountain section between Hakone-Yumoto and Gōra was closed on October 12, 2019, after severe damage caused by Typhoon Hagibis, which triggered landslides and washed away track ballast. In November 2019, the operator announced that repairs would extend into 2020. Test trains resumed on July 9, 2020, and full passenger service was restored on July 23.

On April 1, 2024, the operating company was renamed from Hakone Tozan Railway Co., Ltd. to Odakyu Hakone Co., Ltd., reflecting a broader reorganization within the Odakyu Group.

== Operations ==
The 15.0-kilometre (9.3 mi) line climbs 527 metres (1,729 ft) from Odawara to Gōra while traversing Fuji-Hakone-Izu National Park. Its alignment and infrastructure were designed to minimize environmental impact while accommodating difficult topography. The line is mostly single-track with passing loops at stations and switchbacks.

The Hakone Tozan Line consists of two operational sections:

=== Odawara–Hakone-Yumoto ===
This section is electrified at 1,500 V DC and uses 1,067 mm (3 ft 6 in) track. All services are operated by Odakyu Electric Railway as part of the Odakyū Odawara Line. Limited Express "Romancecar" and local services run through to and from Odawara, with some Limited Express services continuing to Shinjuku Station and, on weekends, to Kita-Senju Station via the Tokyo Metro Chiyoda Line. Journey time between Odawara and Hakone-Yumoto is approximately 15 minutes.

=== Hakone-Yumoto–Gōra ===
The mountain section is electrified at 750 V DC and laid to standard gauge. It is operated exclusively by Hakone Tozan Railway trains designed for mountainous terrain, including steep gradients up to 8% and tight curves with a minimum radius of 169 metres (555 ft). The section includes three switchbacks and takes approximately 40 minutes to traverse.

== Stations ==
All stations are located in Kanagawa Prefecture.

Legend:

- ● - all trains stop
- ｜- all trains pass

No.	Station	Distance in km (mi)		Elevation in m (ft)	Romancecar	Local	Local	Transfers	Location
No.	Station	Between stations	Total	Elevation in m (ft)	Romancecar	Local	Local	Transfers	Location
OH47	Odawara 小田原	—N/a	0 (0)	26 (85)	●	●		Odawara Line (OH47; through service); Tokaido Shinkansen; Tōkaidō Line (JT16); Daiyūzan Line (ID01)	Odawara
OH48	Hakone-Itabashi 箱根板橋	1.7 (1.1)	1.7 (1.1)	27 (89)	|	●			Odawara
OH49	Kazamatsuri 風祭	1.5 (0.93)	3.2 (2.0)	48 (157)	|	●			Odawara
OH50	Iriuda 入生田	1.0 (0.62)	4.2 (2.6)	66 (217)	|	●			Odawara
OH51	Hakone-Yumoto 箱根湯本	1.9 (1.2)	6.1 (3.8)	108 (354)	●	●	●		Hakone, Ashigarashimo; District
OH52	Tōnosawa 塔ノ沢	1.0 (0.62)	7.1 (4.4)	165 (541)			●		Hakone, Ashigarashimo; District
—N/a	Deyama switchback	1.2 (0.75)	8.3 (5.2)	234 (768)			|		Hakone, Ashigarashimo; District
OH53	Ōhiradai 大平台	1.6 (0.99)	9.9 (6.2)	349 (1,145)			●		Hakone, Ashigarashimo; District
—N/a	Kami-Ōhiradai switchback	0.5 (0.31)	10.4 (6.5)	359 (1,178)			|		Hakone, Ashigarashimo; District
—N/a	Sennindai signal stop	0.8 (0.50)	11.2 (7.0)	410 (1,350)			|		Hakone, Ashigarashimo; District
OH54	Miyanoshita 宮ノ下	0.9 (0.56)	12.1 (7.5)	448 (1,470)			●		Hakone, Ashigarashimo; District
OH55	Kowakidani 小涌谷	1.3 (0.81)	13.4 (8.3)	535 (1,755)			●		Hakone, Ashigarashimo; District
OH56	Chōkoku-no-Mori 彫刻の森	0.9 (0.56)	14.3 (8.9)	551 (1,808)			●		Hakone, Ashigarashimo; District
OH57	Gōra 強羅	0.7 (0.43)	15.0 (9.3)	553 (1,814)			●	Cable Line (OH57)	Hakone, Ashigarashimo; District

=== Signal stops ===
There are three signal stops on the Hakone Tozan Line in addition to the regular passenger stations. All of them have a passing loop and two of them have switchbacks.

==== Deyama switchback ====
Signal stop with a switchback. Located at 234 metres (768 ft) above mean sea level (AMSL). Coordinates: 35°13′57″N 139°05′14″E

==== Kami-Ōhiradai switchback ====
Signal stop with a switchback near Ōhiradai station. Located at 359 metres (1,178 ft) AMSL. Coordinates: 35°14′08″N 139°04′32″E

==== Sennindai signal stop ====
Signal stop without a switchback. Located at 410 metres (1,350 ft) AMSL. Coordinates: 35°14′18″N 139°04′09″E

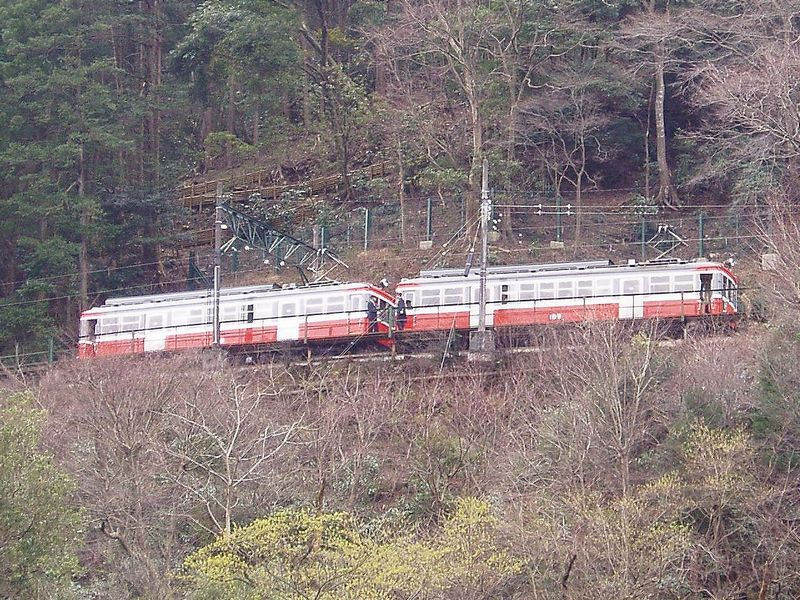
Deyama switchback

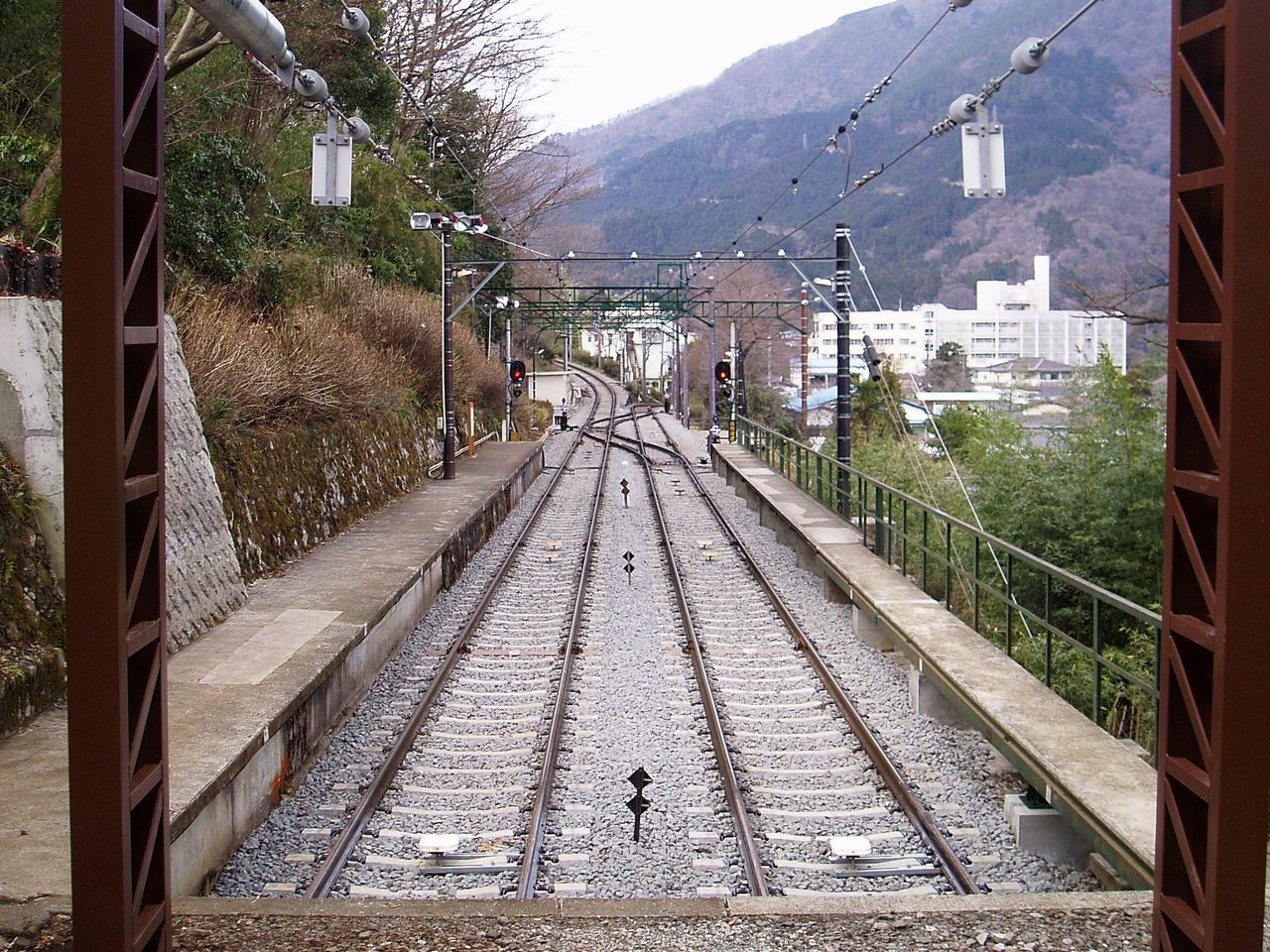
Kami-Ōhiradai switchback

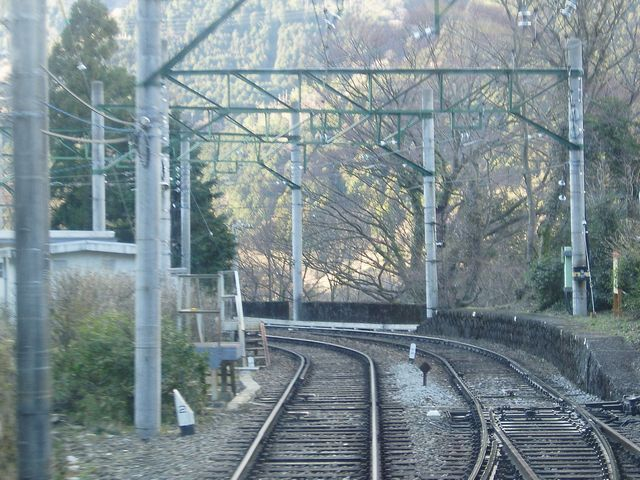
Sennindai signal stop

== Rolling stock ==
=== Hakone Tozan Railway (Hakone-Yumoto - Gōra) ===
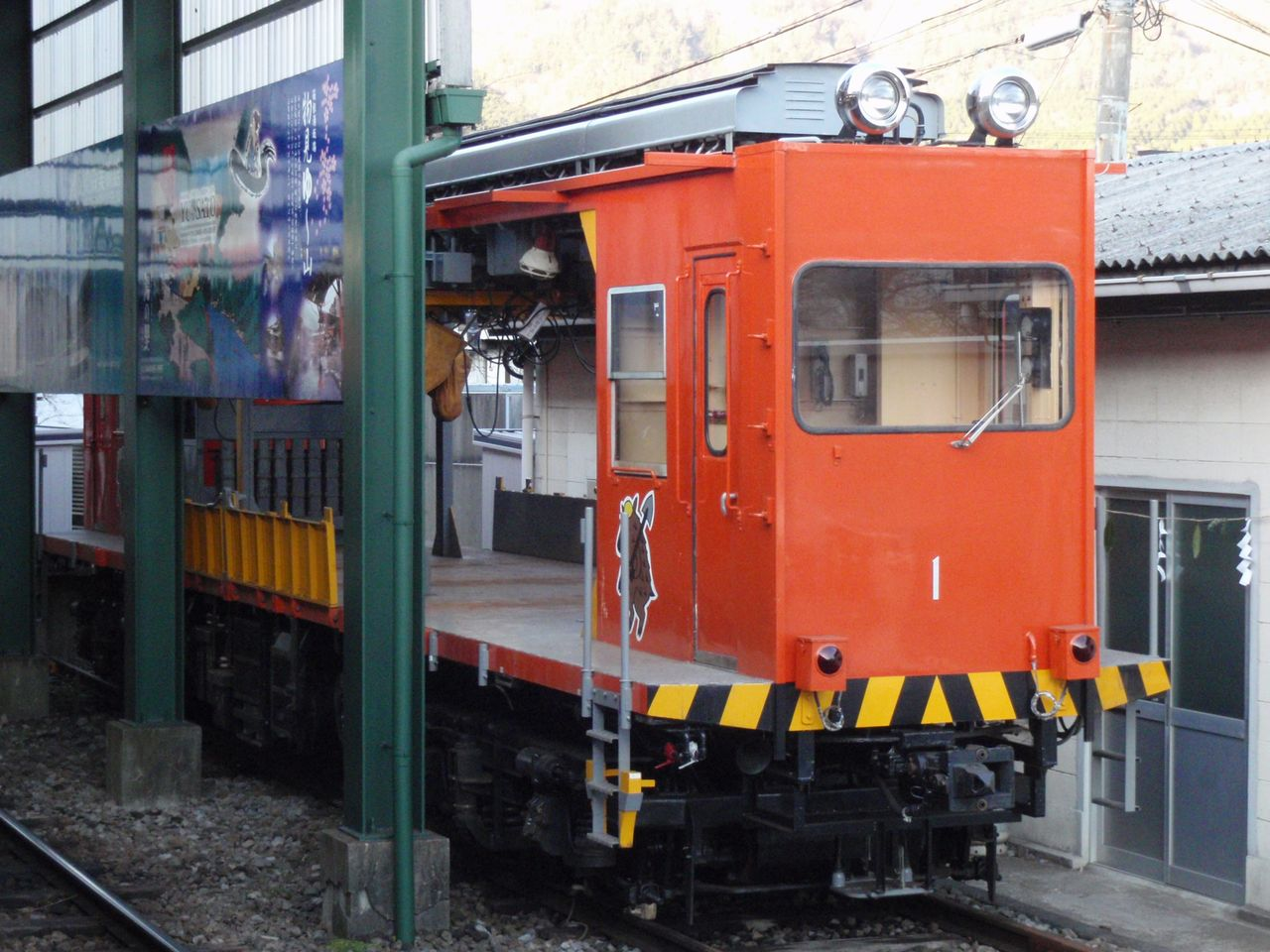
MoNi 1 car at Gōra station in January 2010.

- MoHa 1 (formerly ChiKi 1, since 1919)
- MoHa 2 (formerly ChiKi 2, since 1927)
- 1000 series ("Bernina", named after the Rhätische Bahn railway of the same name in Switzerland)
- 2000 series ("St. Moritz", after the Swiss resort town and Bernina Railway terminus)
- 3000 series (since November 2014)
- 3100 series two-car EMU (since May 2017)
- MoNi 1 (non-revenue car, since 1975)

All trains are based at Iriuda Depot.

==== Planned ====
- 4000 series three-car EMU (planned for 2028)

==== Former ====
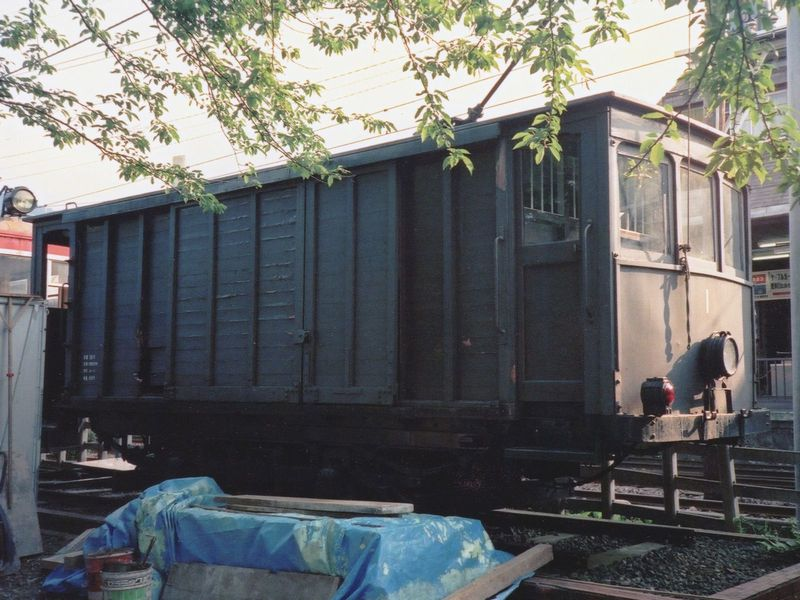
Yu 1 goods wagon at Gōra station in 1992.

- MoHa 3 (withdrawn in 1997)
- Mu 1 (goods wagon, withdrawn in 1952/1992)
- Yu 1 (goods wagon, withdrawn in 1976)

=== Odakyu Electric Railway (Shinjuku - Odawara - Hakone-Yumoto) ===
==== Romancecar EMUs ====
- Odakyu 7000 series LSE
- Odakyu 10000 series HiSE
- Odakyu 20000 series RSE
- Odakyu 30000 series EXE
- Odakyu 50000 series VSE
- Odakyu 60000 series MSE (also from Kita-Senju)

==== Commuter EMUs ====
- Odakyu 1000 series
- Odakyu 5000 series
- Odakyu 8000 series
