= Miyanoshita Station =

Railway station in Hakone, Kanagawa Prefecture, Japan

Coordinates: 35°14′31.83″N 139°3′46.51″E

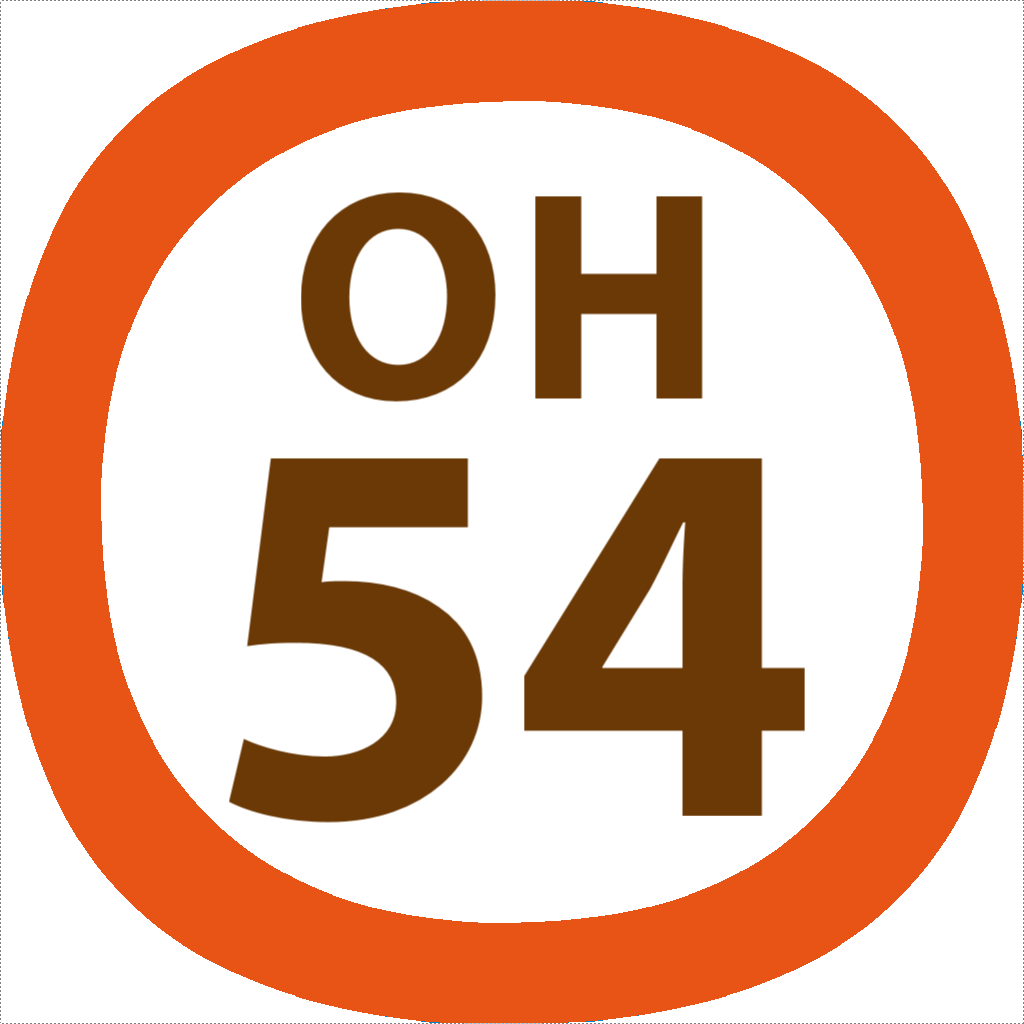
Miyanoshita Station 宮ノ下駅

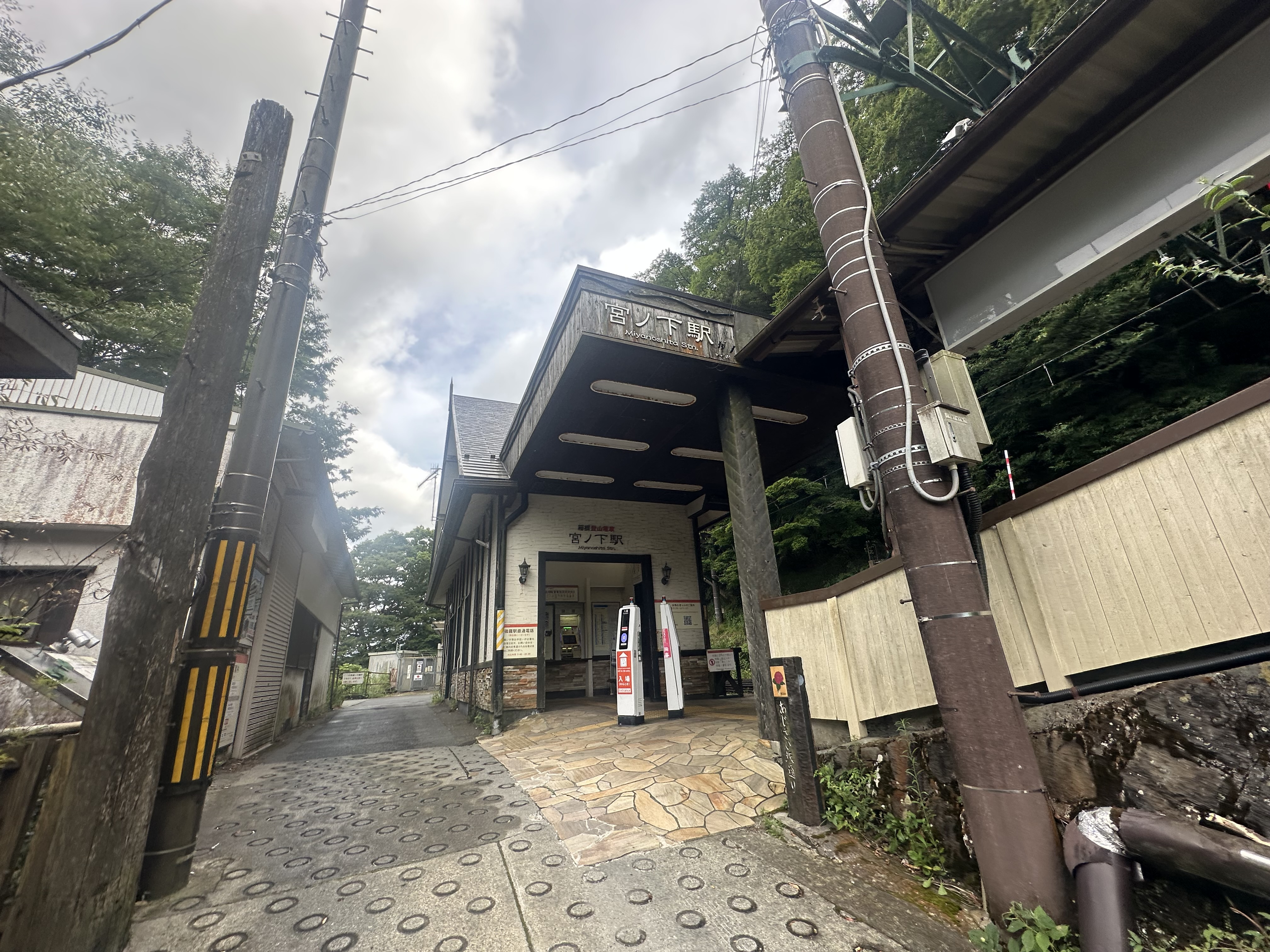
- Entrance of Miyanoshita Station

General information
- Location: Miyanoshita, Hakone, Ashigarashimo, Kanagawa （神奈川県足柄下郡箱根町宮ノ下字蛇骨４０４－１１） Japan
- Operator: Hakone Tozan Railway
- Line: Hakone Tozan Line
- Connections: Bus stop

History
- Opened: 1919

Services
Preceding station	Odakyu Hakone	Following station
Kowakidani towards Gōra	Hakone Tozan Line	Ōhiradai towards Hakone-Yumoto
Location

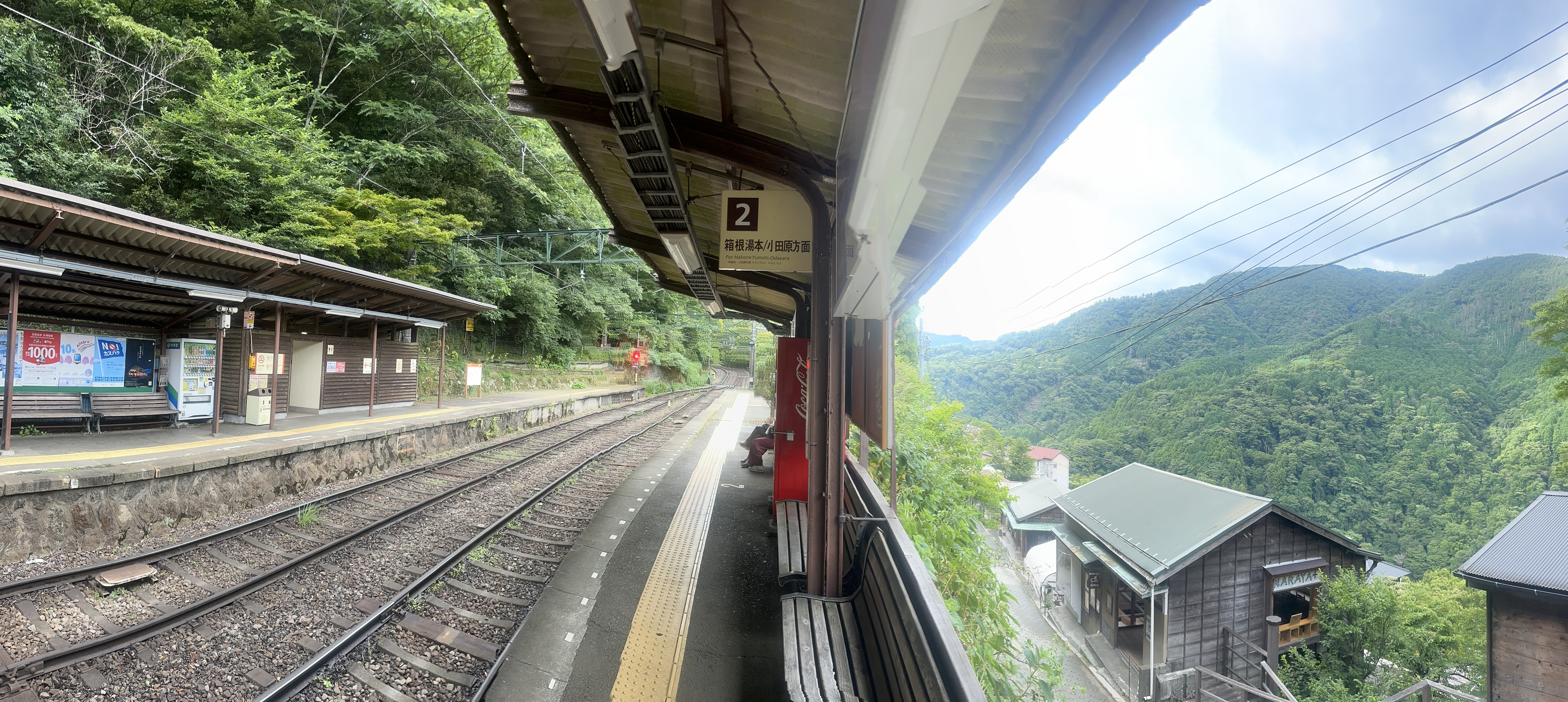
Platforms and tracks, 2025

Miyanoshita Station (宮ノ下駅, Miyanoshita-eki) is a railway station on the Hakone Tozan Line located in Hakone, Kanagawa Prefecture, Japan. It is 12.1 rail kilometers from the line's terminus at Odawara Station.

== History ==
Miyanoshita Station was opened on June 1, 1919.

On 1 April 2024, operations of the station came under the aegis of Odakyu Hakone resulting from restructuring of Odakyu Group operations in the Hakone area.

== Lines ==
- Hakone Tozan Railway
  - Hakone Tozan Line

== Building ==
Miyanoshita Station has two opposed side platforms.

=== Platforms ===
1	■ Hakone Tozan Line	Westbound (For Gōra)
2	■ Hakone Tozan Line	Eastbound (For Hakone-Yumoto, Odawara)

== Bus services ==
- Hakone Tozan Bus
  - "H" line for Hakone Machi Ko (Lake Ashi) via Kowakidani Station, Kowaki-en, Moto Hakone Ko (Hakone Shrine: Transfer for Sightseeing Cruise), Hakone Checkpoint
  - "T" line for Togendai (Lake Ashi: Transfer for Sightseeing Cruise) via Venetian Glass Museum, Sengoku (Transfer for Gotemba Premium Outlets and JR Gotemba Station; a gateway station for Mount Fuji and Fuji Five Lakes, including Lake Kawaguchi and Lake Yamanaka), Kawamukai (The Little Prince and Saint-Exupéry Museum), Senkyoro-mae (Transfer for Pola Museum of Art), Sengoku-kogen (Pampas grass viewing spot)
  - "H" & "T" line For Ohiradai Station, Hakone Yumoto Station and Odawara Station
- Izu Hakone Bus
  - "J" line for Kojiri via Kowakidani Station, Kowaki-en, Ōwakudani
  - "Z" line for Hakone Checkpoint via Kowakidani Station, Kowaki-en, Moto Hakone (Hakone Shrine)
  - "J" & "Z" line for Ohiradai Station, Hakone Yumoto Station and Odawara Station
