= Kowakidani Station =

Railway station in Hakone, Kanagawa Prefecture, Japan

Coordinates: 35°14′25.66″N 139°3′9.71″E

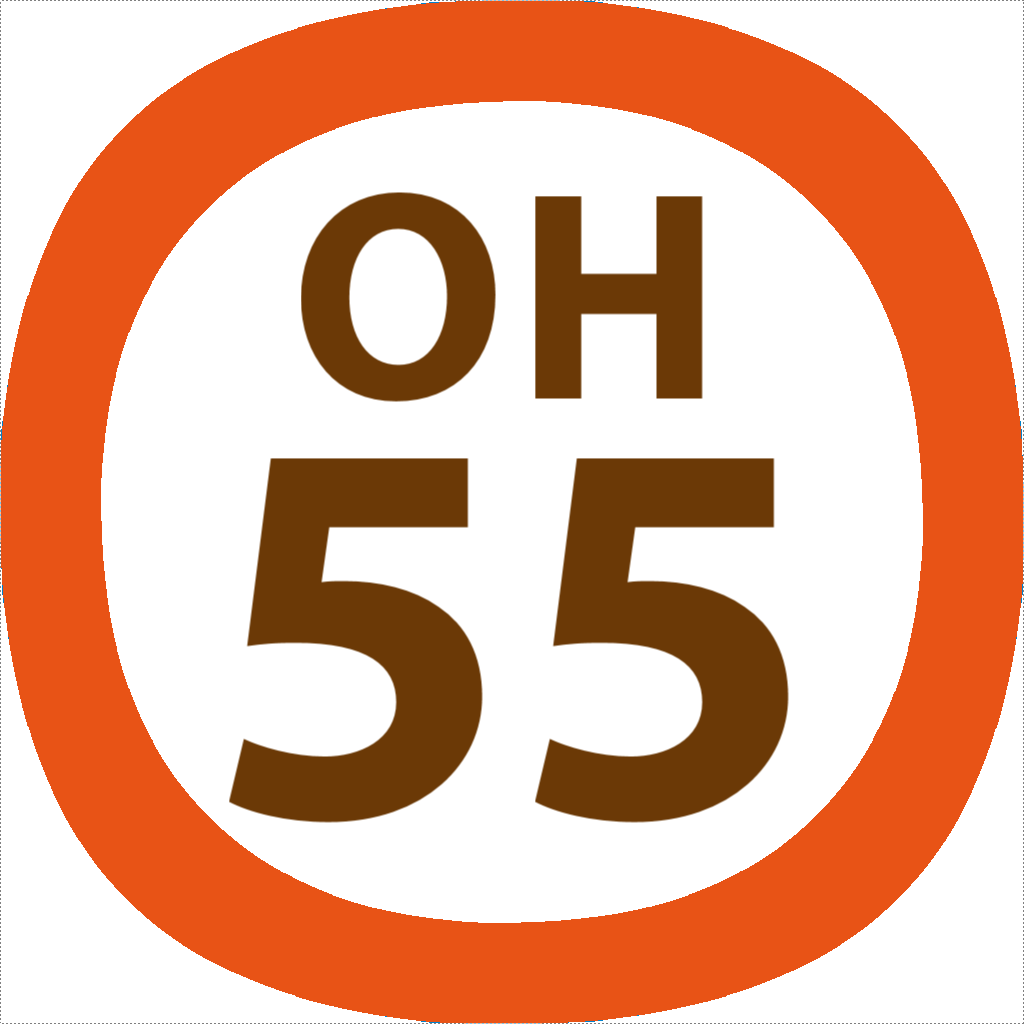
Kowakidani Station 小涌谷駅

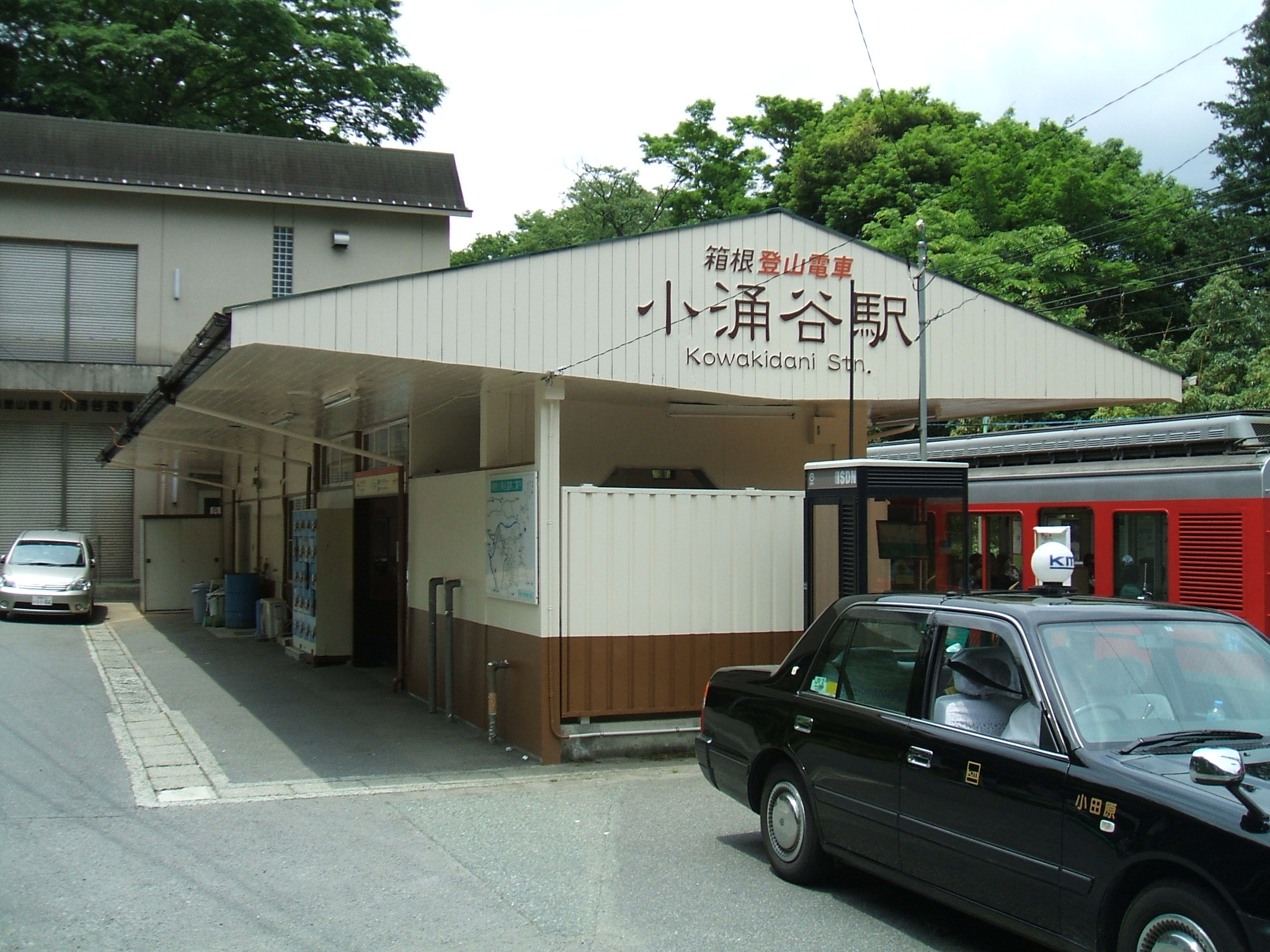
- Exterior of Kowakidani Station

General information
- Location: Kowakidani, Hakone, Ashigarashimo, Kanagawa （神奈川県足柄下郡箱根町小涌谷字四面塔４６６－６） Japan
- Operator: Hakone Tozan Railway
- Line: Hakone Tozan Line
- Connections: Bus stop

History
- Opened: 1919

Services
Preceding station	Odakyu Hakone	Following station
Chōkoku-no-Mori towards Gōra	Hakone Tozan Line	Miyanoshita towards Hakone-Yumoto
Location

Kowakidani Station (小涌谷駅, Kowakidani-eki) is a railway station on the Hakone Tozan Line located in Hakone, Kanagawa Prefecture, Japan. It is 13.4 rail kilometers from the line's terminus at Odawara Station.

== History ==
Kowakidani Station was opened on June 1, 1919.

On 1 April 2024, operations of the station came under the aegis of Odakyu Hakone resulting from restructuring of Odakyu Group operations in the Hakone area.

== Lines ==
- Hakone Tozan Railway
  - Hakone Tozan Line

== Building ==
Kowakidani Station has two opposed side platforms.

=== Platforms ===
1	■ Hakone Tozan Line	Westbound (For Gōra)
2	■ Hakone Tozan Line	Eastbound (For Hakone-Yumoto, Odawara)

== Bus Services ==
- Hakone Tozan Bus
  - "H" line for Hakone Machi Ko (Lake Ashi) via Kowaki-en, Moto Hakone Ko (Hakone Shrine: Transfer for Sightseeing Cruise)and Hakone Checkpoint
  - "H" line for Hakone Yumoto Station and Odawara Station, via Miyanoshita and Ohiradai Station
- Izu Hakone Bus
  - "J" line for Kojiri via Kowaki-en and Ōwakudani
  - "Z" line for Hakone Checkpoint via Kowaki-en and Moto Hakone (Hakone Shrine)
  - "J" & "Z" line for Hakone Yumoto Station and Odawara Station, via Miyanoshita and Ohiradai Station
