= Gotemba Premium Outlets =

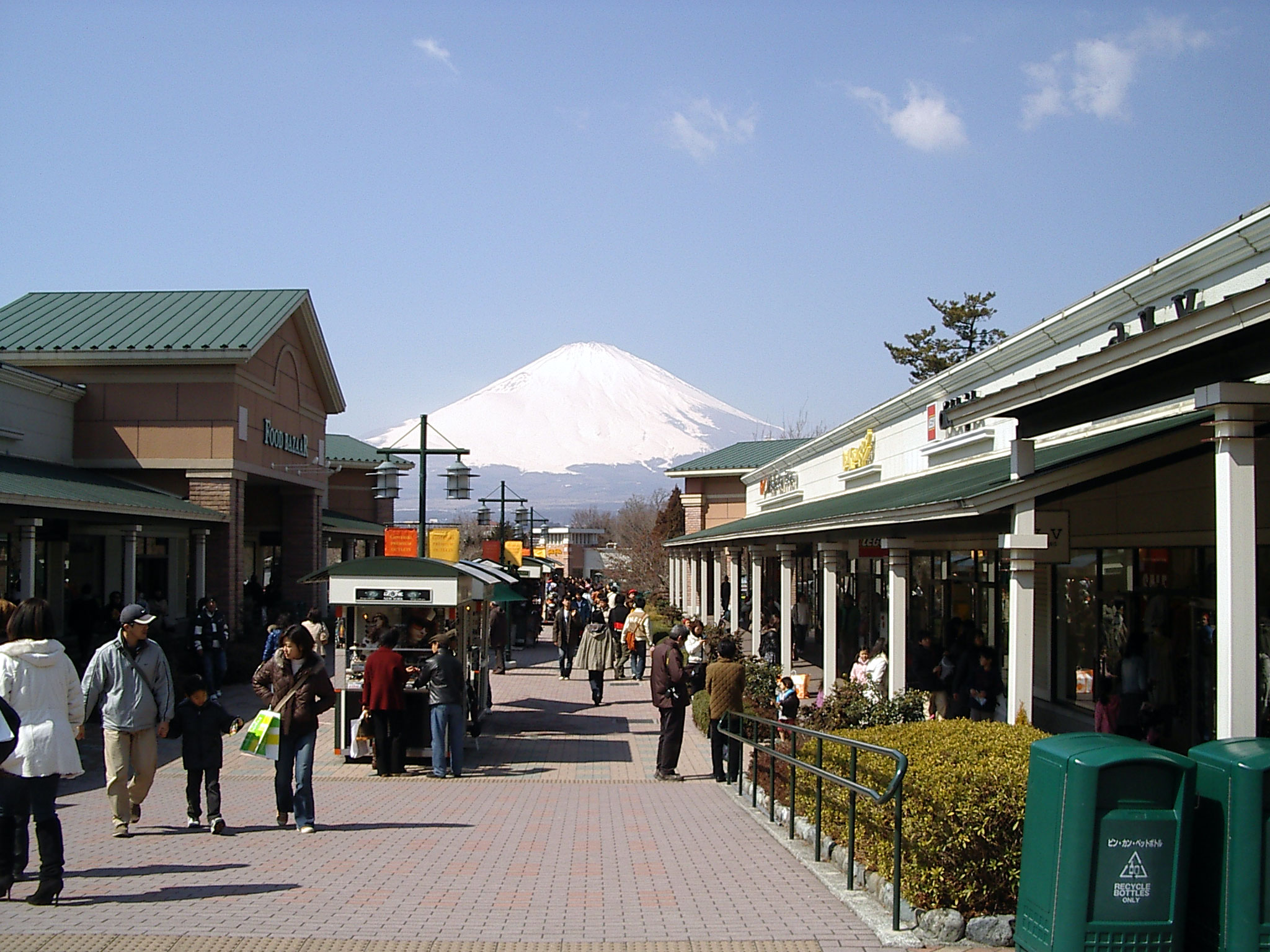
- Location: Gotemba, Shizuoka, Japan
- Coordinates: 35°18′30″N 138°57′50″E
- Address: 1312 Fukasawa
- Opened: July 13, 2000
- Developer: Chelsea Japan
- Manager: Mitsubishi Estate Simon Co., Ltd.
- Owner: Mitsubishi and Simon's Premium Outlets
- Num. of stores: 205
- Floor area: 44,600 m^{2} (480,000 sq ft)
- Floors: 1
- Parking: 5,000
- Website: www.premiumoutlets.co.jp/en/gotemba

The Gotemba Premium Outlets (Japanese: 御殿場プレミアム・アウトレット, Hepburn: Gotemba Puremiamu Autoretto) is an outlet mall located in Gotemba, Shizuoka, Japan, near Mount Fuji. It was opened on July 13, 2000, and contains over 200 stores. The mall is managed by Mitsubishi Estate Simon Co., Ltd., a joint venture between Mitsubishi Estate and Simon Property Group.

== History ==
The mall opened on July 13, 2000. It was extended in July 2003, and further extended in March 2008.

== Access by car ==
- from Tokyo or Nagoya: Tōmei Expressway (Gotemba Interchange)
- from Hakone: National Route 138
- from Lake Kawaguchi and Lake Yamanaka: National Route 138

== Bus services ==
- Free shuttle bus
  - for JR Gotemba Station (transfer for JR Gotemba Line, bus for Mount Fuji, Fuji Five Lakes, and highway bus for Shinjuku Station in Tokyo, JR Yokohama Station and Haneda Airport) via Tōmei Gotemba (transfer for Tōmei Expressway Bus for JR Tokyo Station, JR Shizuoka Station and JR Nagoya Station), by Free Shuttle Bus
- Expressway bus
  - for Shinjuku Station and Tokyo Station by JR Bus Tech
  - for Shinjuku Station by Odakyu Hakone Highway Bus
  - for Ikebukuro Station by Kokusai Kogyo Bus
  - for Shinagawa Station by Keikyu Bus
  - for Yokohama Station by Fuji Express
  - for Tama Plaza Station and Center Kita Station by Tokyu Transse and Fujikyu Shonan Bus
- Local routes
  - for Kawaguchiko Station (Lake Kawaguchi) via Fujisan Station (Fujikyuko Line) and Lake Yamanaka, by Fujikyu Bus
  - for JR Mishima Station (transfer for Tokaido Shinkansen), by Fujikyu Bus
  - for Hakone Ten-yu via Otome Toge (Mt. Fuji viewing spot), Sengoku (transfer for Odawara Station, Hakone Yumoto Station, Miyanoshita and Togendai (Lake Ashi)), Hakone Venetian Glass Museum, Miyagino, Gora Station (Hakone Tozan Line), Hakone Open-Air Museum, Kowaki-en and Yunessun, by Hakone Tozan Bus
  - for Hakone Yumoto Station (Hakone Tozan Line: transfer for Odawara Station) via Otome Toge (Mt. Fuji viewing spot), Sengoku (transfer for Togendai (Lake Ashi)) and Miyanoshita, by Hakone Tozan Bus
