= Sengokuhara =

District of Hakone, Kanagawa, Japan

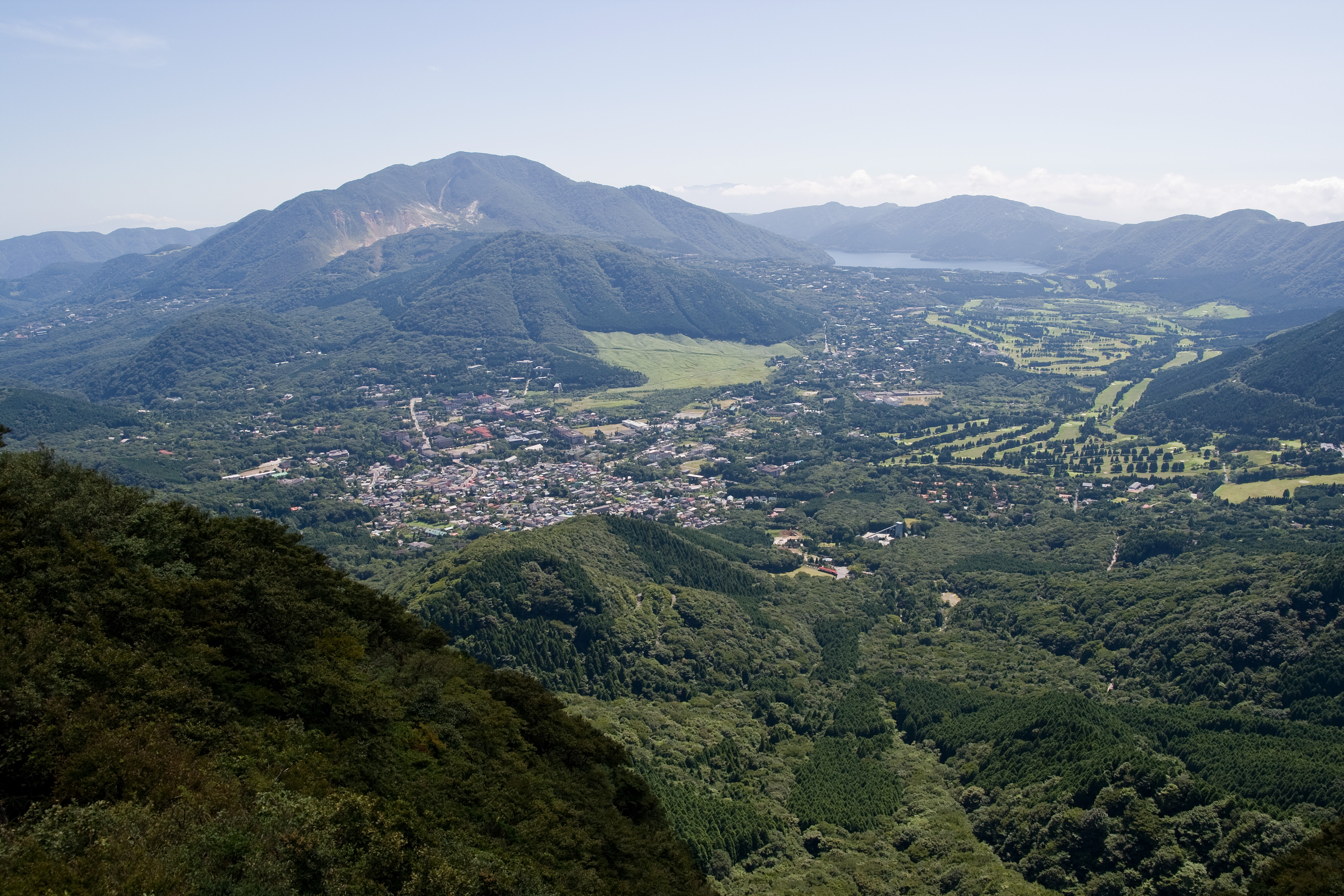
Sengokuhara viewed from Mount Kintoki

Sengokuhara (仙石原), sometimes called Sengokubara, is a district in Hakone, Kanagawa, Japan.

== Geography ==
The district covers a total area of approximately 22 km^{2}, and is located in the northern part of the Hakone caldera. The area is designated a part of Fuji-Hakone-Izu National Park, and includes golf courses, cottages, hotels, and Japanese inns.

=== Mountains ===
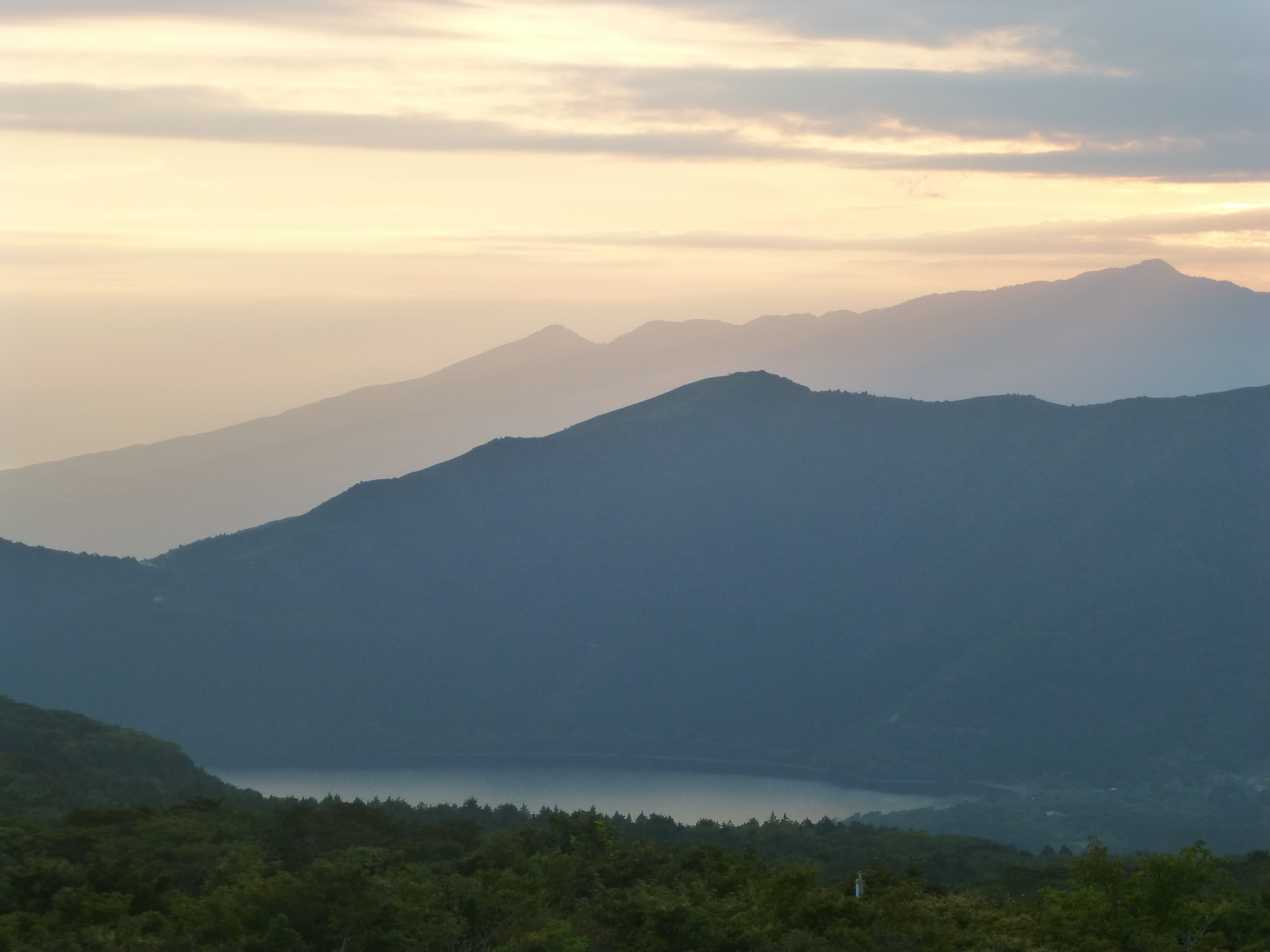
Mount Daigatake

- Mount Kintoki
- Mount Marudake
- Mount Kozuka
- Mount Daigatake

=== Passes ===
- Otome Pass
- Nagao Pass
- Kojiri Pass

=== Rivers ===
- Haya River

== Population ==
As of October 2010, the district has a population of 4,095, with 1,922 households.

== History ==
Following the Meiji restoration, the village of Sengokuhara was founded in 1889. Together with Yumoto town and the villages Onsen (Gora) and Miyagino it was absorbed into the town of Hakone in September 1956. Kisaku Ishimura, the mayor of Sengokuhara, was elected the first mayor of this enlarged Hakone.

== Sightseeing spots ==
- Hakone Botanical Garden of Wetlands (Shissei-Kaen Bus stop)
- The Little Prince and Saint-Exupéry Museum (Kawamukai Bus stop) (permanently closed March 2023)
- Hakone Venetian Glass Museum (Venetian Grass Museum / Hyoseki Bus stop)
- Lalique Museum (Sengoku Annaijo Bus stop)
- Pola Museum of Art (Pola Museum Bus stop)
- Susuki grass viewing in autumn (Sengoku-Kogen Bus stop)
- Choan-ji Temple (Sengoku Bus stop)

== Access by car ==
- from Odawara: National Route 1 and National Route 138
- from Gotemba: National Route 138
- from Lake Ashi: Kanagawa Prefectural Route 75

== Major bus services ==
- Sengoku Bus Stop (仙石) 35.272805°N 139.011637°E
  - for Tōgendai (Lake Ashi)
  - for Hakone Yumoto Station and Odawara Station via Miyanoshita
  - for Ten-yu via Gora Station, Kowaki-en and Yunessun
  - for Ten-yu via Miyagino, Gora Station, Kowaki-en and Yunessun
  - for Shissei-Kaen
  - for Gotemba Premium Outlets and JR Gotemba Station
  - for Shinjuku Station (Tokyo) via JR Gotemba Station and Tomei-Gotemba
  - for Hakone-en, Odakyu Hotel de Yama (next to Hakone Shrine) via Kojiri
- Sengoku Annaisho-mae Bus Stop (仙石案内所前) 35.27130°N 139.01013°E
  - for Tōgendai (Lake Ashi)
  - for Hakone Yumoto Station and Odawara Station via Miyanoshita
  - for Ten-yu via Gōra Station, Kowaki-en and Yunessun
  - for Shissei-Kaen
  - for Shinjuku Station (Tokyo) via JR Gotemba Station and Tomei-Gotemba
  - for Hakone-en, Odakyu Hotel de Yama (next to Hakone Shrine) via Kojiri
  - for Haneda Airport via Yokohama Station
- Senkyoro-mae Bus Stop (仙郷楼前) 35.26430°N 139.01392°E
  - for Tōgendai (Lake Ashi)
  - for Hakone Yumoto Station and Odawara Station via Miyanoshita
  - for Ten-yu via Gora Station, Kowaki-en and Yunessun
  - for Shissei-Kaen
  - for Shinjuku Station (Tokyo) via JR Gotemba Station and Tomei-Gotemba
  - for Hakone-en, Odakyu Hotel de Yama (next to Hakone Shrine) via Kojiri
  - for Haneda Airport via JR Yokohama Station
