= Hakone Shrine =

Shinto shrine in Kanagawa Prefecture, Japan

Hakone Jinja 箱根神社
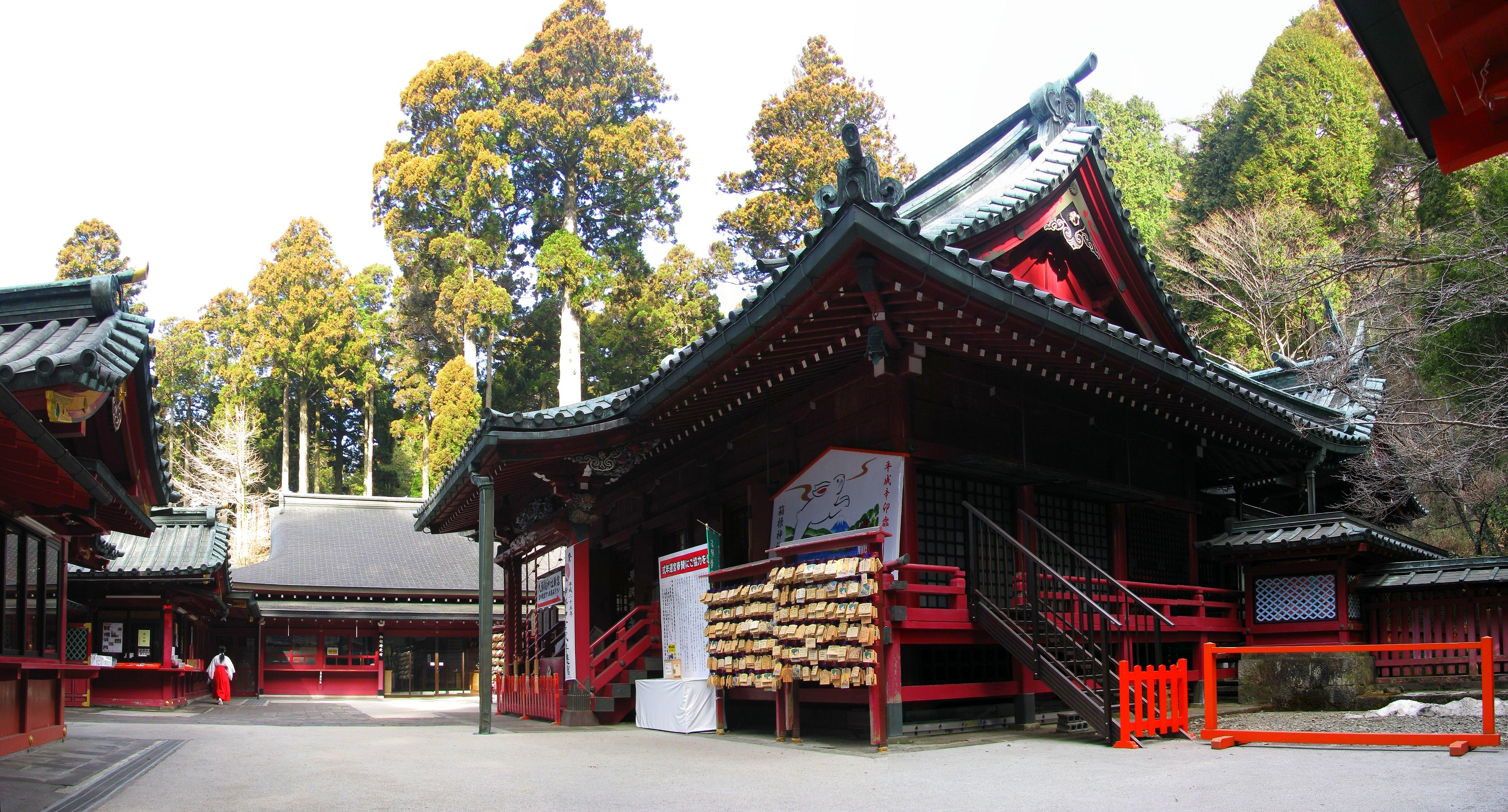
- Haiden of Hakone Jinja

- Location within Japan

Religion
- Affiliation: Shinto
- Deity: Hakone Gongen

Location
- Location: 80-1 Hakone-machi, Ashigarushimo District, Kanagawa
- Interactive map of Hakone Jinja 箱根神社
- Coordinates: 35°12′14″N 139°01′32″E

Architecture
- Established: Nara period

Website
- hakonejinja.or.jp

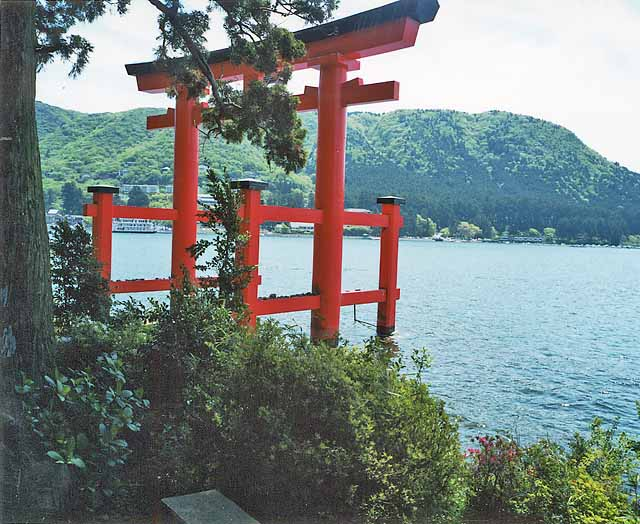
Torii of Hakone Shrine at Lake Ashi

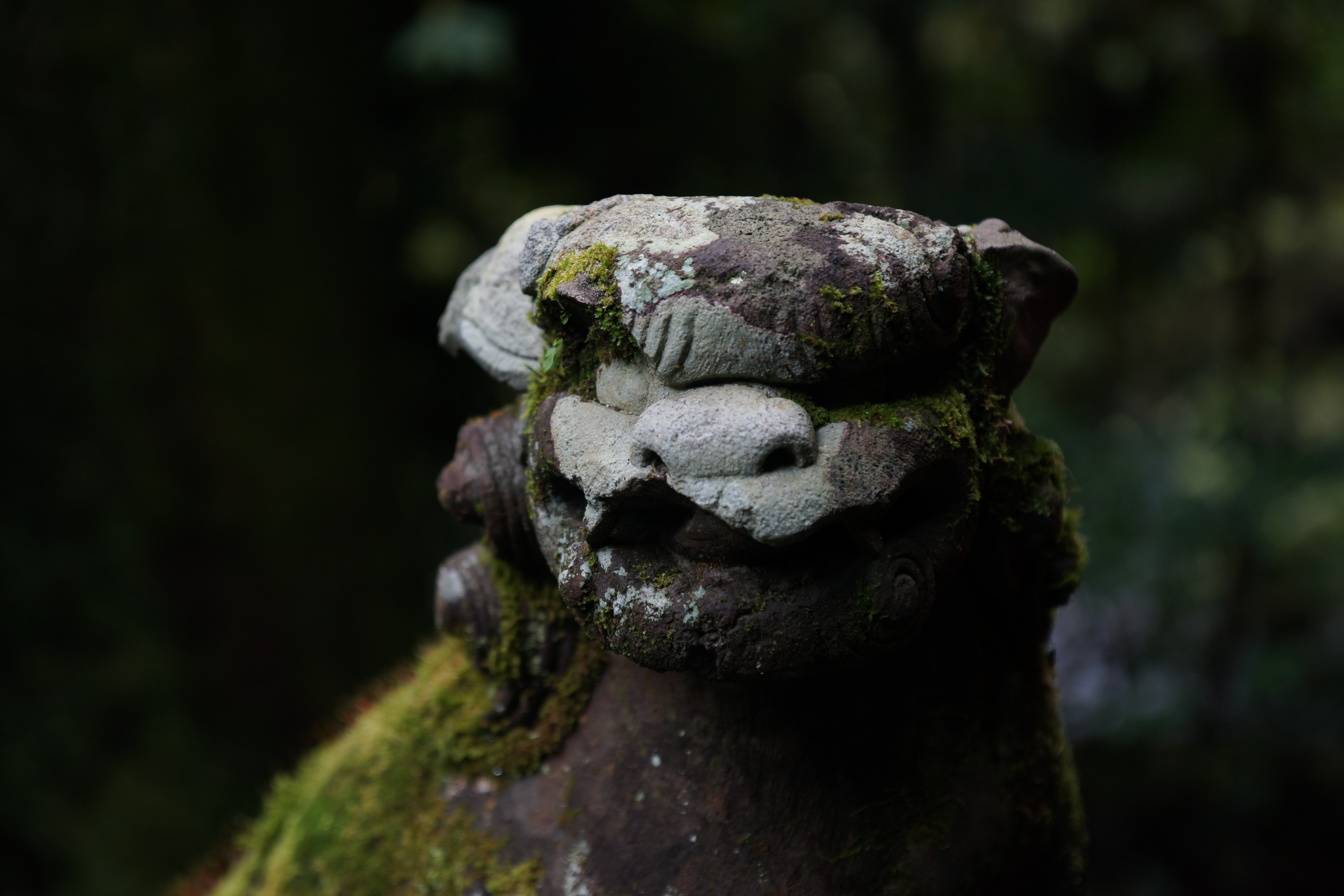
Komainu in Hakone Shrine

The Hakone Shrine (箱根神社, Hakone Jinja) is a Japanese Shinto shrine on the shores of Lake Ashi in the town of Hakone in the Ashigarashimo District of Kanagawa Prefecture. It is also known as the Hakone Gongen (箱根権現).

== Enshrined kami ==
The primary kami of Hakone Shrine are

- Ninigi-no-Mikoto (瓊瓊杵尊)
- Konohanasakuya-hime (木花之開耶姫)
- Hoori-no-Mikoto (火遠理命)

They are known collectively as the Hakone Ōkami (箱根大神).

== History ==
According to shrine tradition, Hakone-jinja was founded in 757 during the reign of Emperor Kōshō. The original shrine was at the summit of the Komagatake peak of Mount Hakone.

The shrine was relocated to the shores of Lake Ashi; its current form dates to 1667. Credit for establishment is also given to Priest Mangan, for pacifying the nine-headed dragon that lived at the bottom of Lake Ashi. According to the Azuma Kagami, Minamoto no Yoritomo sought guidance and shelter from the kami at Hakone after his defeat in Battle of Ishibashiyama during the Genpei War. Upon becoming shōgun, Yoritomo became a patron of the shrine.

In the Kamakura period, the shrine was popular with samurai. This support continued through the Sengoku period.

The shrine was burned down by the forces of Toyotomi Hideyoshi during the Battle of Odawara. It was reconstructed by Tokugawa Ieyasu and given a grant of 200 koku of revenue. The Tokugawa shogunate continued to support the shrine.

In the system of ranked Shinto shrines, Hakone was listed in 1875 among the 3rd class of nationally significant shrines or kokuhei-shōsha (国幣小社).

== Cultural artifacts ==
Hakone Shrine has a small museum, which displays a number of the shrine's treasures. These include five items which are ranked as national Important Cultural Property.

== Events ==
The main festival of the shrine is held annually on August 1.

== See also ==
- List of Shinto shrines in Japan
- Modern system of ranked Shinto shrines
