= Skyride =

Skyride or Sky Ride may refer to:

Aerial lifts

- SkyRide (Busch Gardens Tampa Bay), an aerial lift at Busch Gardens Tampa Bay, Tampa, Florida, United States
- Skyride, an aerial lift at Busch Gardens Williamsburg, James City County, Virginia, United States
- Skyride, a defunct aerial lift at Kings Island, Mason, Ohio, United States,
- Skyride (Six Flags Great Adventure), an aerial lift at Six Flags Great Adventure, Jackson Township, New Jersey, United States
- Skyride, an aerial lift at Stone Mountain, Stone Mountain, Georgia, United States
- Skyride, an official nickname at Katsuragiyama Ropeway, Izunokuni, Shizuoka, Japan
- Skyride, an aerial lift at Alton Towers, Staffordshire, United Kingdom
- Sky Ride, an aerial lift at Cedar Point, Sandusky, Ohio

Others

- Sky Ride, a transporter bridge in Chicago, created as a symbol for the Century of Progress Worlds Fair in 1933
- skyRide, an airport express bus service by TheRide to Denver International Airport, United States
- New York Skyride, a simulator ride at the Empire State Building, New York City, United States
- Skyride, a chairlift of Sentosa Luge, Singapore
- Skyride Unlimited, a company owning KAXL radio station of the Bakersfield, California, United States
- Mayor of London's Sky Ride, an annual cycling event in London
