= List of aerial lifts in Japan =

The list of aerial lifts in Japan lists aerial lifts in the nation.

In Japan, aerial lift, or "ropeway" (索道, sakudō), includes means of transport such as aerial tramway, funitel, gondola lift, funifor, as well as chairlift. All of them are legally considered as a sort of railway. Chairlift is officially called "special ropeway" (特殊索道, tokushu sakudō), while colloquially called "lift" (リフト, rifuto). Other aerial lifts are officially called "normal ropeway" (普通索道, futsū sakudō), or colloquially "ropeway" (ロープウェイ or ロープウェー, rōpuwei or rōpuwē). Technical names exist for each "normal ropeway", such as "double single-cabled automatic loop normal ropeway" (複式単線自動循環式普通索道, fukushiki tansen jidō junkan-shiki futsū sakudō) for funitel gondola lifts, but those names are hardly used outside authorities; most people don't distinguish them. Number of Japanese "normal ropeways" listed here are as follows.

Systems	Full year operational	Seasonal	Total
Gondola lifts	62	32	94
Aerial tramways	68	4	72
Funitel gondola lifts	3	0	3
Funitel aerial tramways	1	0	1
Total	134	36	170

It is also notable that the word "cable car" (ケーブルカー, kēburukā) does not refer to aerial lifts in Japan, but to cable railways, such as cable cars proper or funiculars. (However, Japan currently does not have any cable cars proper, having only funiculars.)

This article only lists "normal ropeways"; in other words, aerial lifts excluding chairlifts. Names might be tentative.

Italicized name: Aerial lifts that operate seasonal, mostly in ski resorts.
^{T}: Aerial tramways. (Those without ^{T} are gondola lifts.)
^{F}: Funitels.

== Hokkaidō ==
- Alpha Cabin, Alpha Resort Tomamu; Hoshino Resort Tomamu
- Annupuri Gondola, Niseko Annupuri Ski Resort; Chūō Bus Kankō Shōji
- Asahidake Ropeway ^{T}, Asahidake Ropeway Ski Resort; Wakasa Resort
- Daisetsuzan Sōunkyō Kurodake Ski Resort; Rinyū Kankō
  - Daisetsuzan Sōunkyō Kurodake Ropeway ^{T}
  - Kurodake Pair Gondola
- Furano Ski Resort; Prince Hotels
  - Furano Ropeway ^{T}
  - Kitanomine Gondola
- Kamui Ski Links Gondola, Kamui Ski Links; Asahikawa Kita Inter Development
- Kiroro Gondola, Kiroro Resort; Kiroro Associates
- Lake Cabin, Windsor Snow Village; The Windsor Hotels International
- Mt. Hakodate Ropeway ^{T}

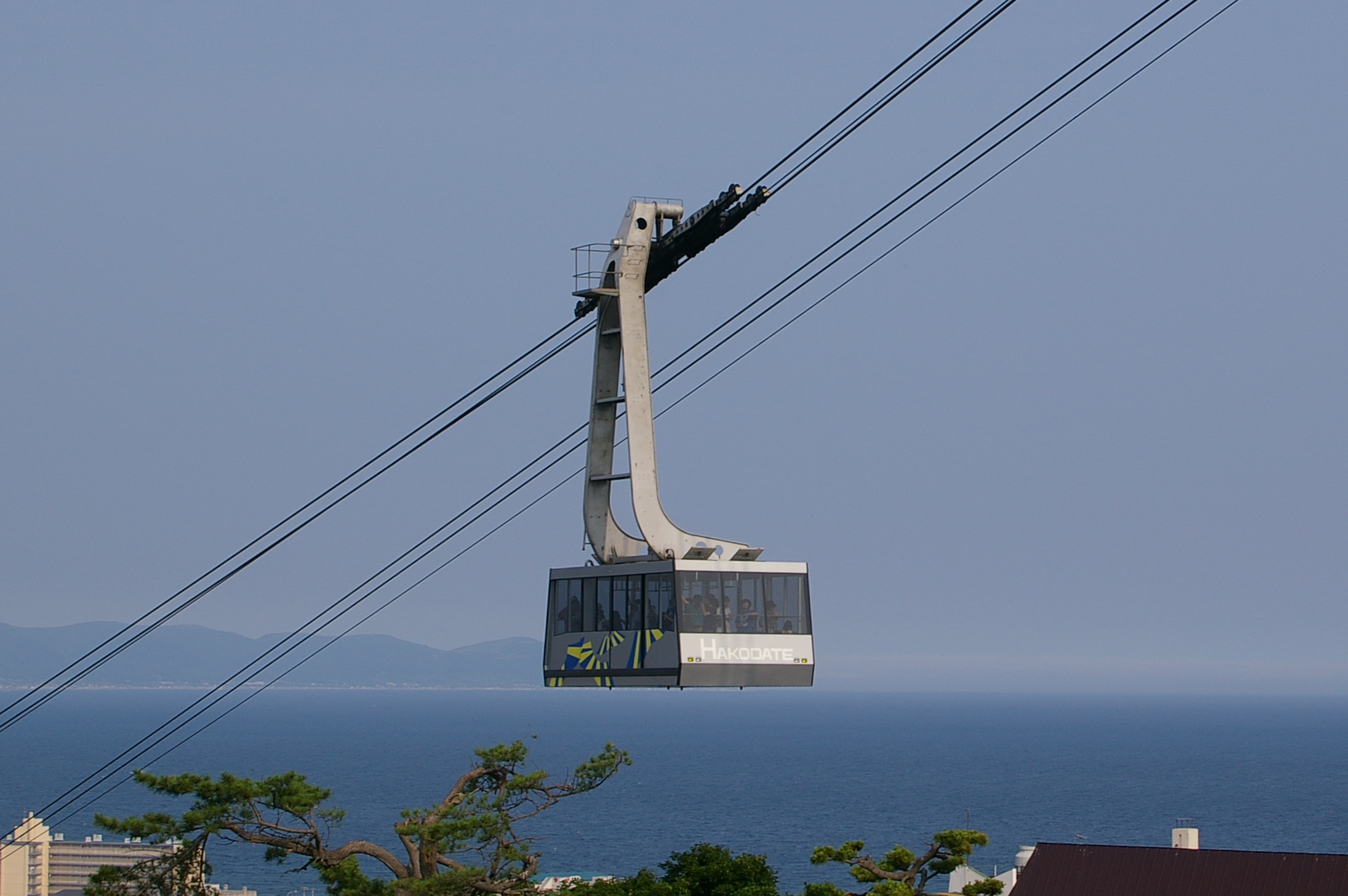
Mt. Hakodate Ropeway. The background is Tsugaru Strait.

- Mt. Moiwa Ropeway ^{T}, Sapporo Moiwayama Ski Resort; Sapporo Development
- Nanae Gondola, Hakodate Nanae Ski Resort; Winter Garden
- Niseko Mt. Resort Grand Hirafu; Niseko Mountain Resort
  - Ace #2 Center Four
  - Hirafu Gondola
- Noboribetsu Onsen Ropeway; Noboribetsu Onsen Cable
- Otaru Tenguyama Ropeway ^{T}, Otaru Tenguyama Ski Resort; Chūō Bus Kankō Shōji
- Prince Gondola, Niseko Higashiyama Ski Resort; Niseko Higashiyama Resort
- Rusutsu Resort; Kamori Kankō
  - East Gondola Line 1
  - East Gondola Line 2
  - Izora Gondola
  - West Gondola
- Sahoro Gondola, Sahoro Resort; Kamori Kankō
- Sapporo International Ski Resort; Sapporo Resort Development
  - Skycabin 6
  - Skycabin 8
- Sapporo Teine; Kamori Kankō
  - Teine Eight Gondola
  - Teineyama Ropeway ^{T}
- Shuttle 6 Gondola, Mount Racey; Yūbari Resort
- Usuzan Ropeway ^{T}; Wakasa Resort

== Tōhoku region ==
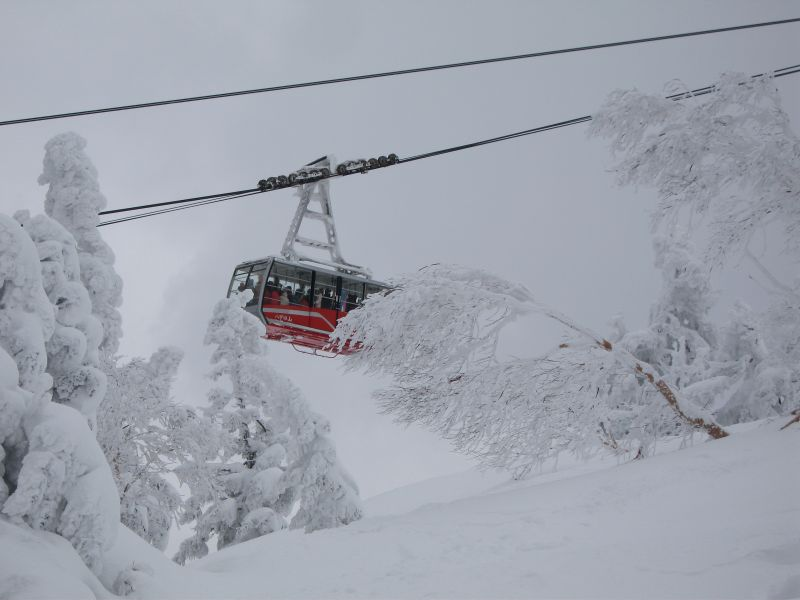
Hakkōda Ropeway in snow.

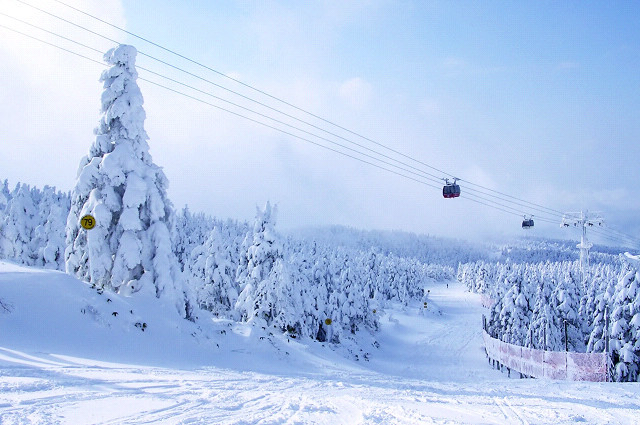
Zaō Ropeway funitel

=== Aomori Prefecture ===
- Ajigasawa Ski Resort; Winter Garden Resorts
- Hakkōda Ropeway ^{T}
- Ōwani Ajara Park Gondola, Ōwani Regional General Development
- Tsugaru Iwaki Skyline

=== Iwate Prefecture ===
- Appi Kogen Ski Resort; Iwate Hotel and Resort
  - Appi Gondola
  - Sailer Gondola
- Geto Kōgen Ski Resort; Geto Kōgen Development
  - First Gondola
  - Second Gondola
- Iwate Kōgen Snow Park; Hotel & Resort Management
- Shizukuishi Ski Resort; Prince Hotels
  - Second Gondola
  - Senshōgahara
  - Ropeway ^{T}

=== Akita Prefecture ===
- Ani Gondola: Winter Garden Resorts

=== Miyagi Prefecture ===
- Eboshi Kōgen Gondola; Miyagi Zaō Kankō
- Resort Park Onikōbe; Onikōbe Resort System

=== Yamagata Prefecture ===
- Gondola, Miyagi Zaō Eboshi Ski Resort; Miyagi Zaō Kankō
- Tengendai Ropeway ^{T}; Nishiazuma Ropeway
- Zaō Chūō Ropeway ^{T}
- Zaō Ropeway, Yamagata Zaō Onsen Ski Resort
  - Sanchō Line ^{F}
  - Sanroku Line ^{T}
- Zaō Skycable, Yamagata Zaō Onsen Ski Resort; Yamakō

=== Fukushima Prefecture ===
- Adatara Express, Adatara Kōgen Ski Resort; Fujikyū Adatara Kankō
- Altz Gondola, Altz Bandai; Bandai Resort Development
- Gondola, Urabandai Gran Deco Ski Resort; Tōkyū Resort Service
- Tenkyōdai Gondola (Skyshuttle), Inawashiro Resort; Cest la vie Resort

== Kantō region ==
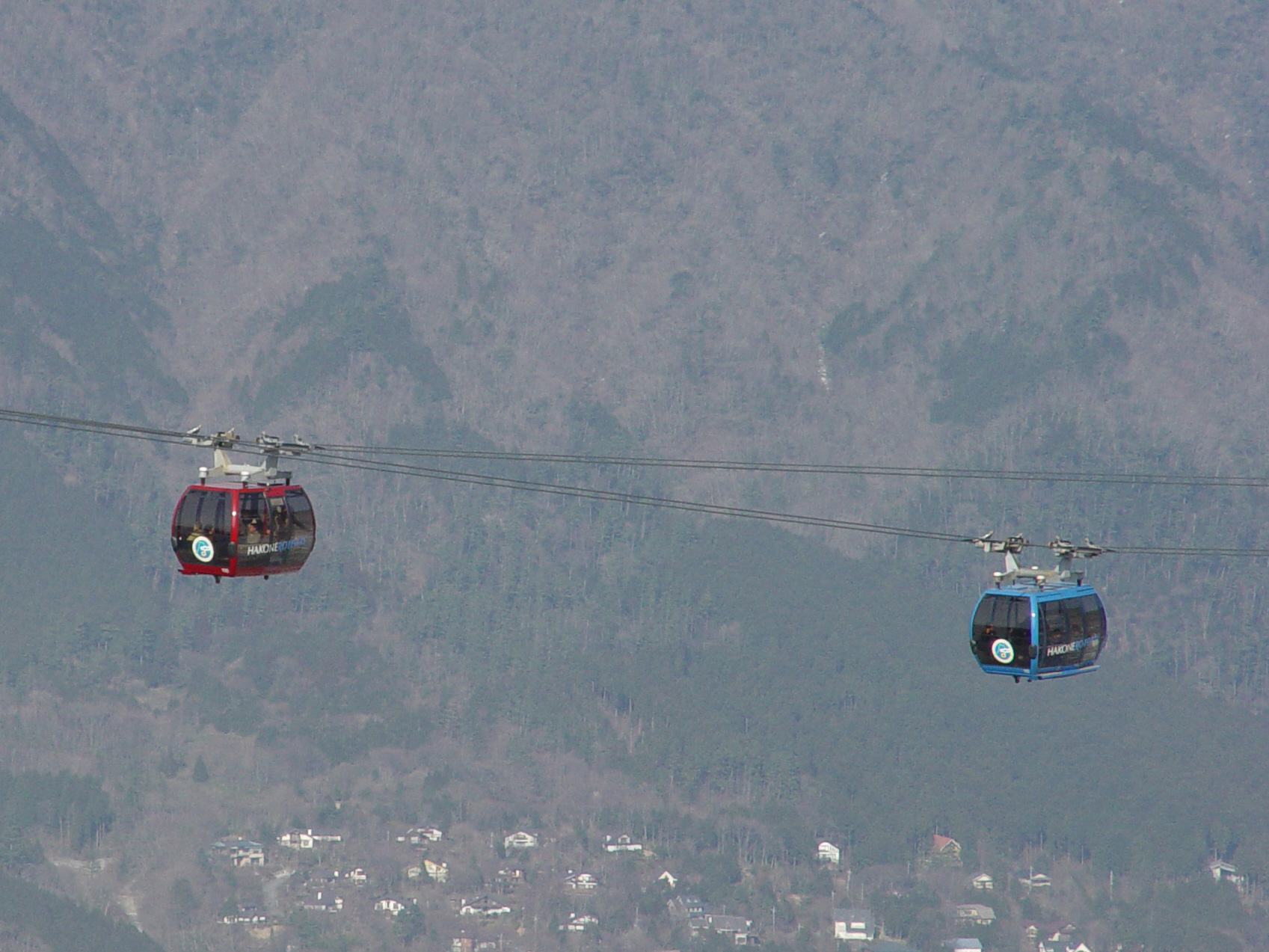
Hakone Ropeway is the second funitel in Japan.

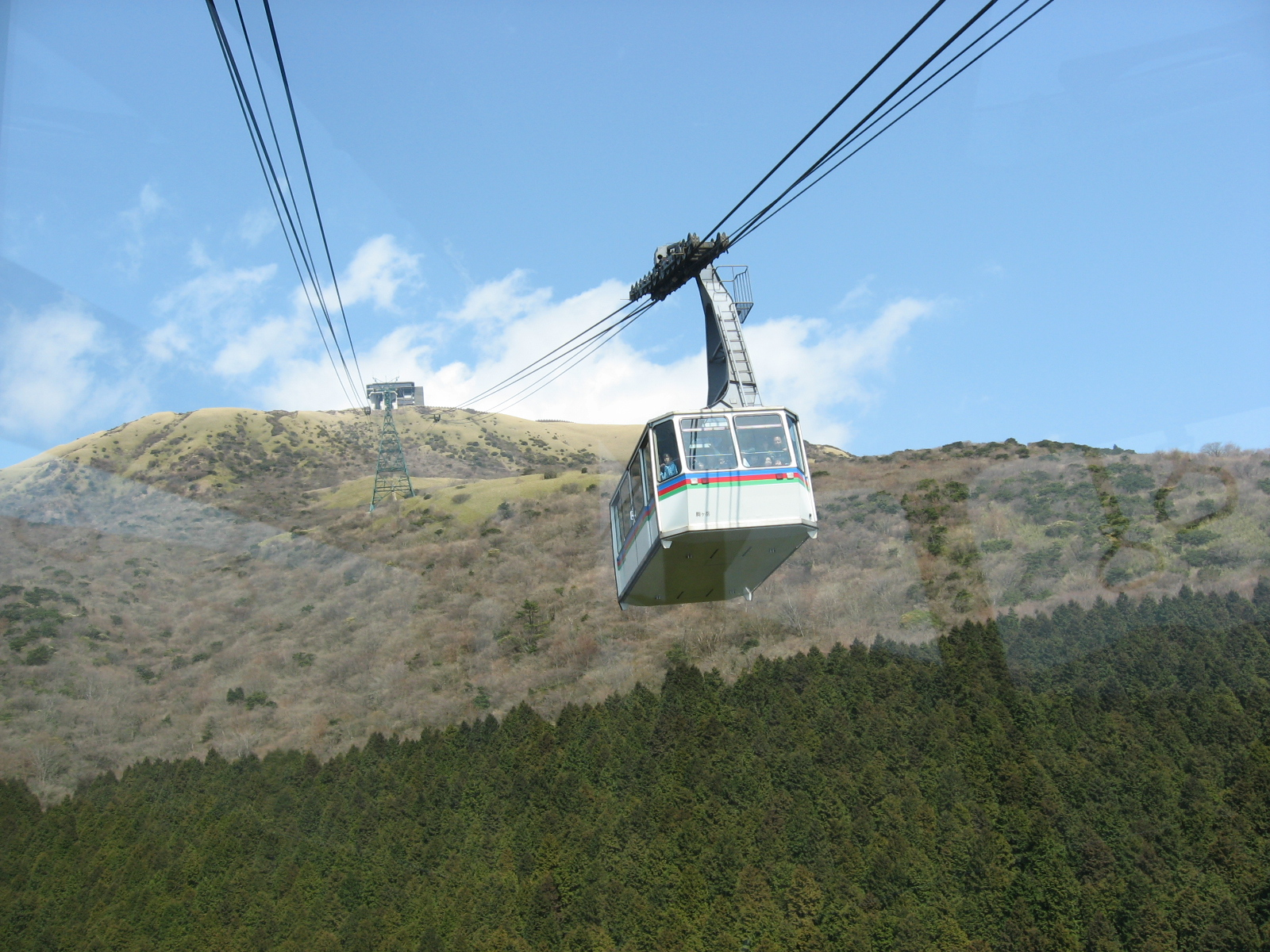
Hakone Komagatake Ropeway.

=== Gunma Prefecture ===
- Gondola Pal Cabin, Palcall Tsumakoi Ski Resort; Palcall Tsumakoi
- Gondola Super Way, White World Oze Iwakura; Oze Development
- Harunasan Ropeway; Tanigawadake Ropeway
- Ikaho Ropeway ^{T}; Shibukawa City Government
- Nikkō Shiranesan Ropeway, Malnuma Kōgen Ski Resort; Nippon Paper Development
- Shirane Kazan Ropeway, Kusatsu International Ski Resort; Kusatsu Town Government
- Tanigawadake Ropeway ^{F}, Mount Tanigawa Tenjindaira Ski Resort

=== Tochigi Prefecture ===
- Akechidaira Ropeway ^{T}; Nikkō-kōtsū
- Gondola Lift, Hunter Mt. Shiobara
- Kinugawa Onsen Ropeway ^{T} 鬼怒川温泉ロープウェイ; Kinugawa Kōgen Kaihatsu
- Nasu Ropeway ^{T} 那須ロープウェイ; Tōya Kōtsū
- Jeans Gondola, Mt. Jeans Ski Resort; Hunter Mt. Shiobara

=== Ibaraki Prefecture ===
- Mt. Tsukuba Ropeway ^{T}; Ibaraki Kankō Railway

=== Chiba Prefecture ===
- Nokogiriyama Ropeway ^{T}

=== Saitama Prefecture ===
- Hodosan Ropeway ^{T}; Hodo Kōgyō

=== Kanagawa Prefecture ===
- Hakone Komagatake Ropeway ^{T}; Izuhakone Railway
- Hakone Ropeway ^{F}
- Skyshuttle; Yomiuriland (also partly in Tokyo)
- Yokohama Air Cabin; Senyo Kogyo
- Yume no Gondola ^{T}, Seiyūkaku Yamatoya Hotel

== Chūbu region ==
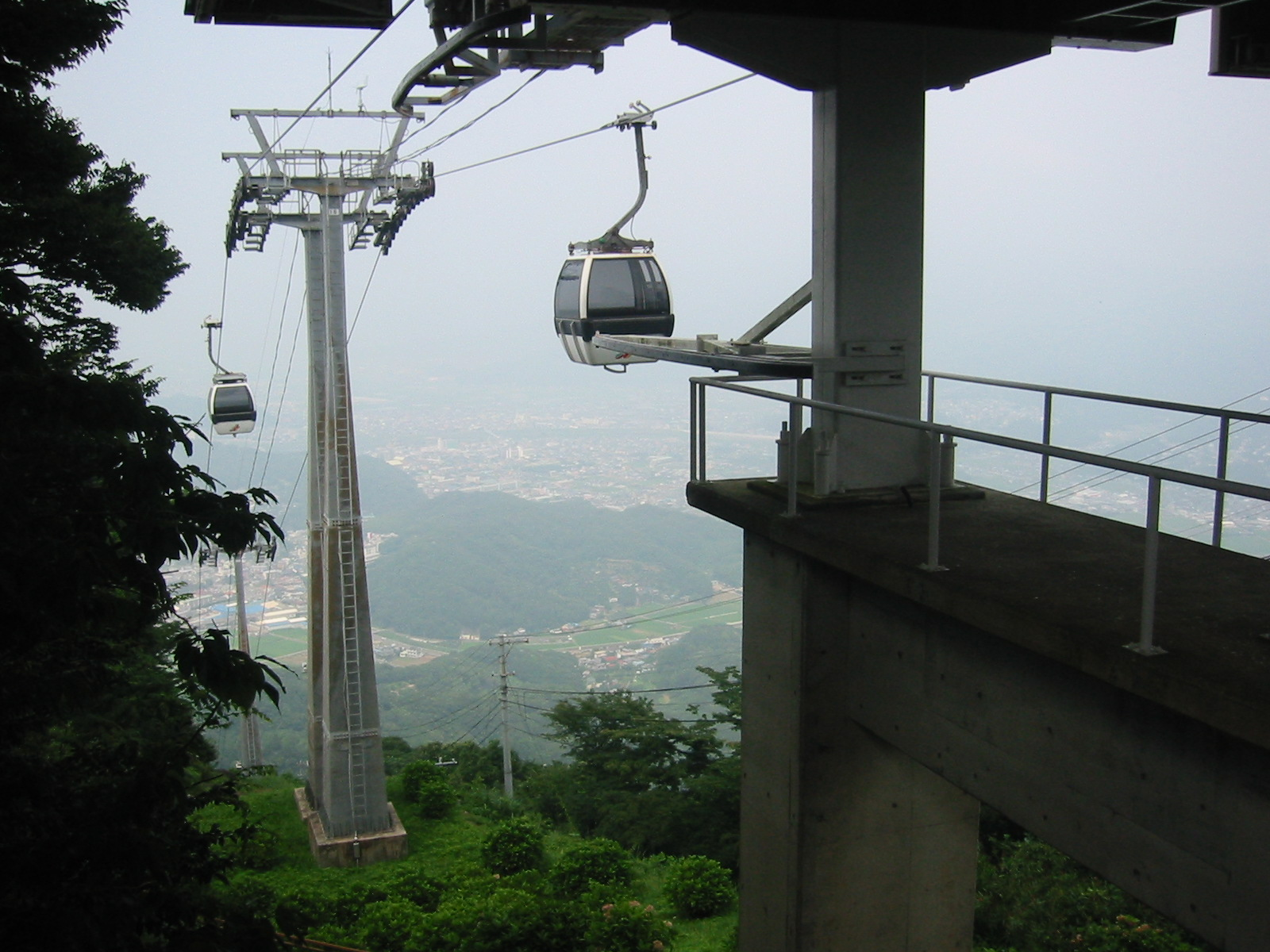
Katsuragiyama Ropeway, Shizuoka.

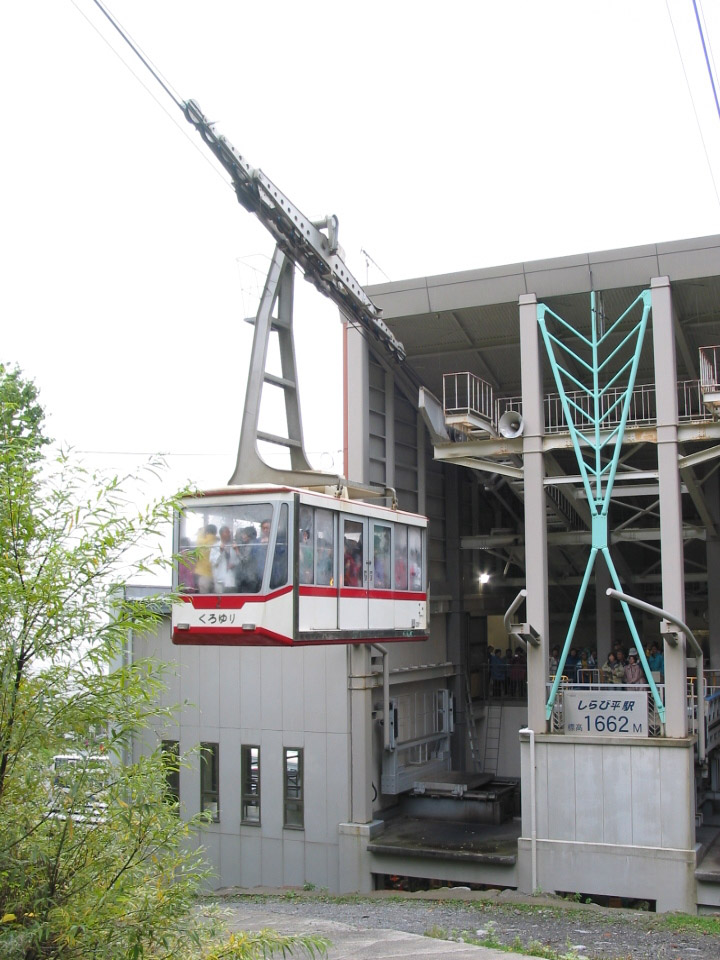
Komagatake Ropeway, Nagano.

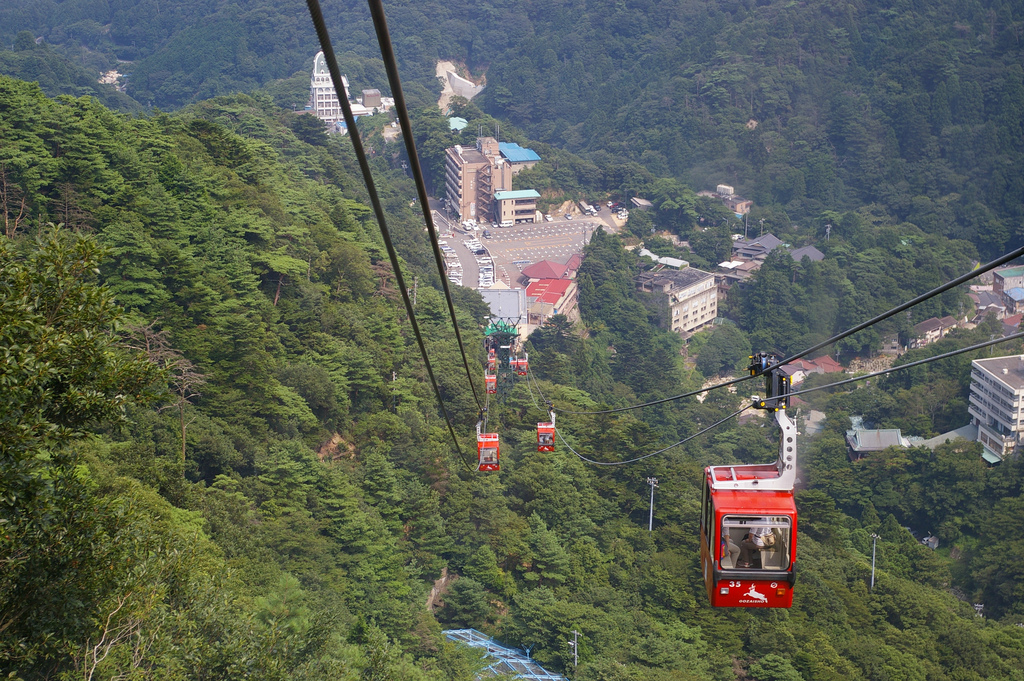
Gozaisho Ropeway, Mie.

=== Shizuoka Prefecture ===
- Atami Ropeway ^{T}
- Awashima Kaijō Ropeway ^{T}; Awashima Marinepark
- Kanzanji Ropeway ^{T}; Entetsu Tourism Development
- Katsuragiyama Ropeway (Skyride), Izu Nagaoka Panorama Park; Dainichi
- Nihondaira Ropeway ^{T}; Shizuoka Railway
- Shimoda Ropeway ^{T}

=== Yamanashi Prefecture ===
- Lake Kawaguchi Mt. Tenjō Ropeway (Tenjō-Yama Park Mt. Kachi Kachi Ropeway) ^{T}; Fuji Kyūkō
- Minobusan Ropeway ^{T}; Minobu Tozan Railway
- Shōsenkyō Ropeway ^{T}; Shōsenkyō Kankō

=== Nagano Prefecture ===
- Fifth Gondola (Skysneakers), Tangram Ski Circus; Tangram Madarao
- Fujimidai Kōgen Ropeway; Heavens Sonohara
- Gondola, Okushiga-Kōgen Ski Resort; Nagano Electric Railway
- Gondola Adam, Hakuba Happō-One Ski Resort; Hakuba Kankō Kaihatsu
- Gondola Noah, Hakuba Iwatake Ski Resort; Hakuba Kakō Kaihatsu
- Gondola Ryūsei, Fujimi Panorama Resort; Fujimi Town Development
- Goryū Tōmi Tele Cabin, Hakuba Goryū Ski Resort; Enrei
- Nozawa Onsen Ski Resort; Nozawa Onsen
  - Hikage Gondola
  - Nagasaka Gondola
- Ontake Gondola Sanhō Line (Skylove), Ontake Ski Resort; Ontake Management
- Hakuba47 Winter Sports Park; Hakuba47
  - First Gondola
  - Forth Gondola
- Hasuike Ropeway ^{T}, Shigakōgen Ski Resort; Shigakōgen Ropeway
- Higashitateyama Gondola Lift, Shiga Kōgen Higashitateyama Ski Resort; Shigayama Lift
- Komagatake Ropeway ^{T}, Chūō Alpes Senjōjiki Ski Resort; Chūō Alpes Kankō
- Ontake Ropeway, Ontake Ropeway Ski Resort
- Pilatus Tateshina Ropeway ^{T}, Pilatus Tateshina Ski Resort
- Ryuoo Ropeway ^{T}, Ryuoo Ski Park; Ryuoo Kanko
- Shiga Kōgen Yakebitaiyama Ski Resort; Prince Hotels
  - Yakebitaiyama First Gondola
  - Yakebitaiyama Second Gondola
- Tateshina Bokujō Gondola (Shuttle Venus). Shirakaba Kōgen International Ski Resort; Tateshina Town Government
- Tsugaike Kōgen Ski Resort; Tsugaike Gondola Lift
  - Tsugaike Gondola (Gondola Eve)
  - Tsugaike Ropeway ^{T}

=== Niigata Prefecture ===
- Arai Gondola Lift; Arai Resort
- Gala Yuzawa Ski Resort; Gala Yuzawa
  - Gondola Diligence
  - Ropeway LanDau ^{T} (Temporary closed)
- Gondola, Cupid Valley Ski Resort; Cupid Valley
- Hakkaisan Ropeway ^{T}, Muikamachi Hakkaisan Ski Resort; Prince Hotels
- Iwappara Gondola, Iwa-ppara Winter Resort; Iwappara Kankō (Temporary closed)
- Maiko Gondola , Maiko Kōrakuen Ski Resort; Tokyo Dome Resort Operations
- Mt. Naeba Ski Resort; Prince Hotels
  - Kagura Gondola
  - Mitsumata Ropeway ^{T}
  - Naeba-Tashiro Gondola (Dragondola)
  - Prince First Gondola
  - Prince Second Gondola
  - Tashiro Ropeway ^{T}
- Myōkōkōgen Sky Cable gondola, Akakura Kankō Ski Resort
- Myōkō Suginohara Gondola, Myōkō Suginohara Ski Resort; Prince Hotels
- Yahikoyama Ropeway ^{T}; Yahikoyama Kankō Ropeway
- Yuzawa Kōgen Ropeway (Yuzawa Onsen Ropeway) ^{T}, Yuzawa Kōgen Ski Resort; Snow Resort Service

=== Ishikawa Prefecture ===
- Gondola, Sky Shishiku Ski Resort; Atom Unyu
- Gondola Lift, Hakusan Sena Kōgen Ski Resort; Hakusan Lake Highland
- Rino, Hakusan Ichirino Onsen Ski Resort; Hakusanshi Chiikishinkōkōsha

=== Toyama Prefecture ===
- Gondola Lift, Iox-Arosa; Iō Arosa
- Tateyama Ropeway ^{T}; Tateyama Kurobe Kankō
- Tateyama Sanroku Gondola Lift, Raichō Valley Ski Resort; Ōyama Kankō Kaihatsu

=== Gifu Prefecture ===
- Gondola Flying Ciao, Ciao Ontake Ski Resort; Hida Forest City Planning
- Mt. Kinka Ropeway ^{T}; Gifu Kankō Ropeway
- Shinhotaka Ropeway; Okuhi Sightseeing Development
  - No. 1 Ropeway ^{T}
  - No. 2 Ropeway ^{T}
- SP Gondola, Takasu Snow Park; J Mountains Group
- Wing Gondola, Wing Hills Shirotori Resort; Royal Hills

=== Mie Prefecture ===
- Gozaisho Ropeway, Gozaisho Ski Resort

== Kansai region ==
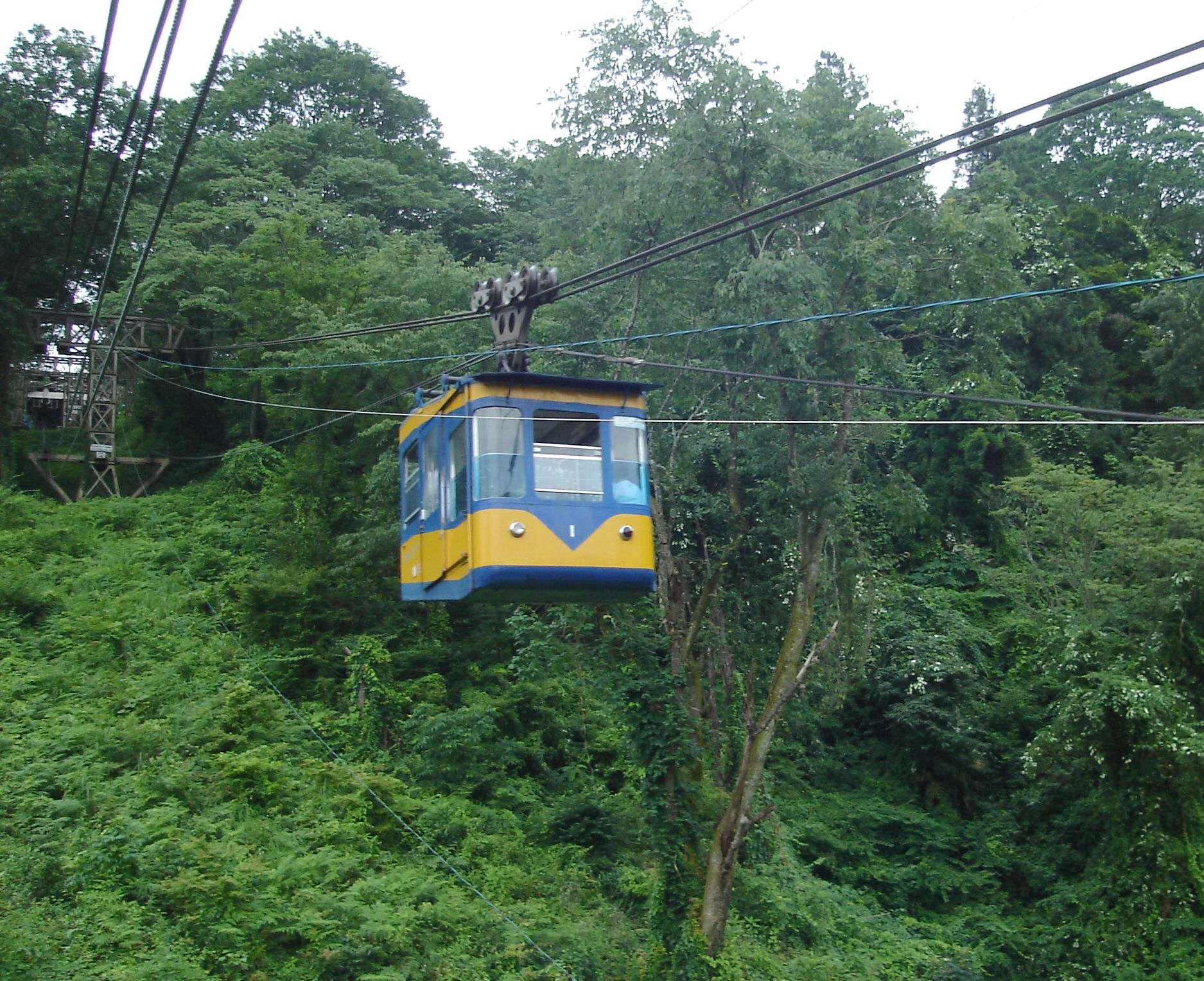
Yoshino Ropeway is the oldest surviving aerial lift in Japan, operated from 1929.

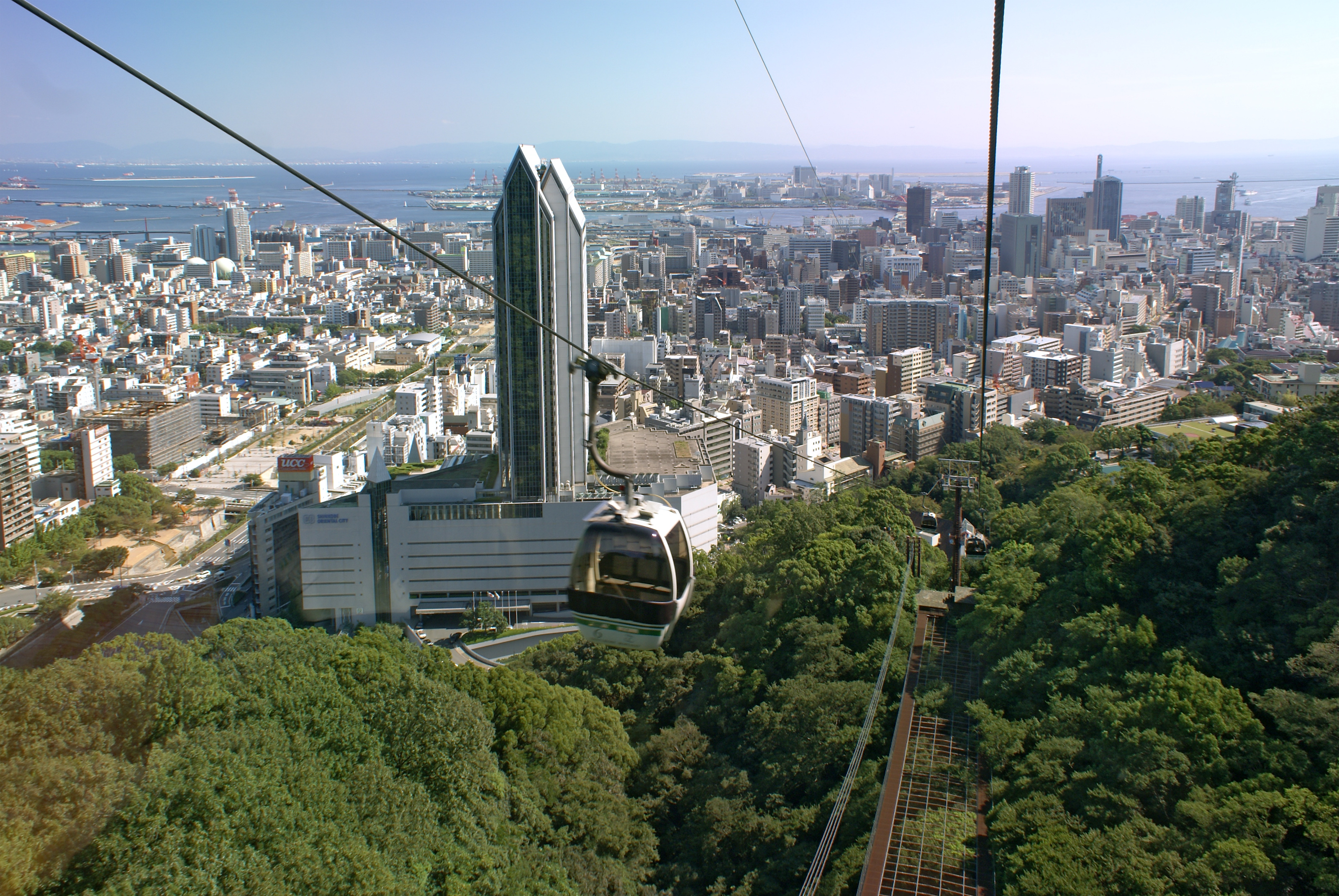
Kobe Nunobiki Ropeway and the skyscrapers of Kōbe.

=== Shiga Prefecture ===
- Alpes Gondola, Biwako Valley Ski Resort; Biwako Valley
- Hachimanyama Ropeway ^{T}; Ohmi Railway
- Hakodateyama Ropeway ^{T}, Hakodateyama Ski Resort; Ohmi Railway
- Ibukiyama Ropeway, Piste Japon Ibuki Ski Resort; Piste Japon

=== Nara Prefecture ===
- Katsuragisan Ropeway ^{T}; Kintetsu Railway
- Yoshino Ropeway ^{T}; Yoshino Ōmine Kēburu Bus

=== Kyōto Prefecture ===
- Eizan Ropeway ^{T}; Keifuku Electric Railway

=== Ōsaka Prefecture ===
- Mt. Kongō Ropeway ^{T}; Chihayaakasaka Village Government

=== Hyōgo Prefecture ===
- Kami Town Ojiro Gondola Lift, Ojiro Ski Resort; Ojiro Tourist Association
- Kinosaki Onsen Ropeway ^{T}; Kinosaki Kankō
- Maya Ropeway (Maya View Line Yume-Sanpo) ^{T}; Kōbe City Urban Development
- Mt. Shosha Ropeway ^{T}; Himeji City Government
- Rokkō Arima Ropeway ^{T}; Kōbe City Urban Development
- Kobe Nunobiki Ropeway (Shin-Kōbe Ropeway); Kōbe City Urban Development
- Sky Safari, Himeji Central Park; Kamori Kankō
- Sumaura Ropeway ^{T}; Sanyō Electric Railway

== Chūgoku region ==
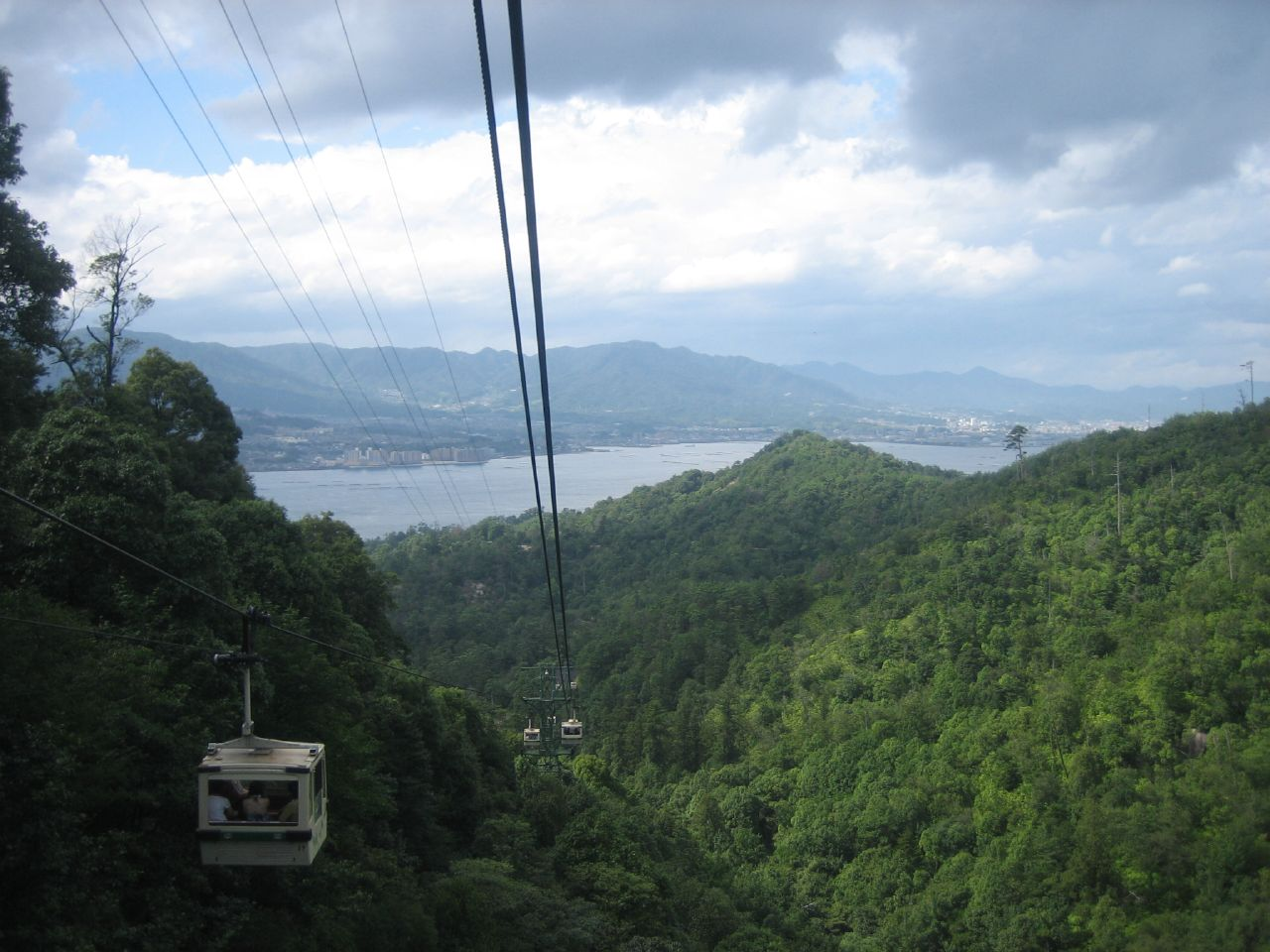
Miyajima Ropeway Momijidani Line, Miyajima, Hiroshima.

=== Hiroshima Prefecture ===
- Miyajima Ropeway; Hiroshima Tourism Promoting
  - Sanchō Line ^{T}
  - Sanroku Line
- Senkōji Ropeway ^{T}; Onomichi City Government

=== Yamaguchi Prefecture ===
- Iwakunijō Ropeway ^{T}; Iwakuni City Government
- Ōhirayama Ropeway ^{T}; Hōfu City Government

=== Shimane Prefecture ===
- Asahi Tengusuton Ski Resort; Airana
- Gondola, Mizuho Highland; Shinrin Keikaku

== Shikoku region ==
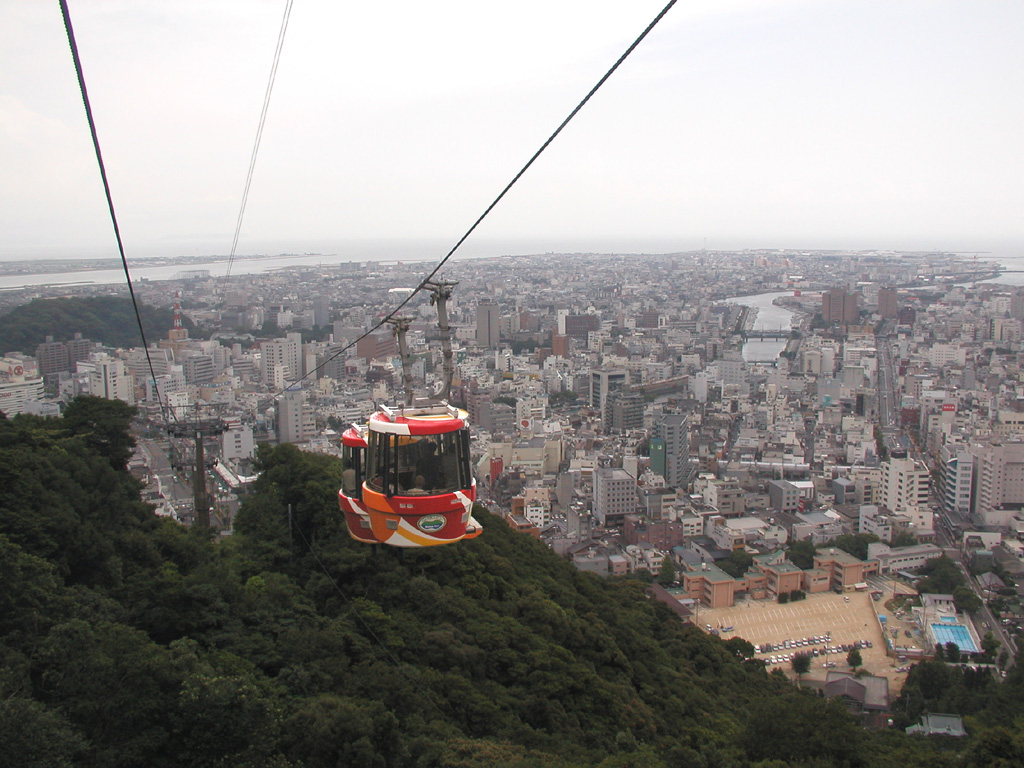
Bizan Ropeway, Tokushima.

=== Kagawa Prefecture ===
- Kankakei Ropeway ^{T}; Shōdoshima Sōgō Kaihatsu
- Unpenji Ropeway ^{T}; Shikoku Cable

=== Tokushima Prefecture ===
- Bizan Ropeway ^{T}; Tokushima City Tourist Association
- Hashikurasan Ropeway ^{TF}
- Tairyūji Ropeway ^{T}; Shikoku Cable

=== Ehime Prefecture ===
- Ishizuchi Tozan Ropeway ^{T}, Ishizuchi Ski & Snowboard Resort
- Matsuyamajō Ropeway ^{T}; Matsuyama City Government
- Okudōgo Ropeway ^{T}; Okudōgo Kokusai Kankō

== Kyūshū region ==
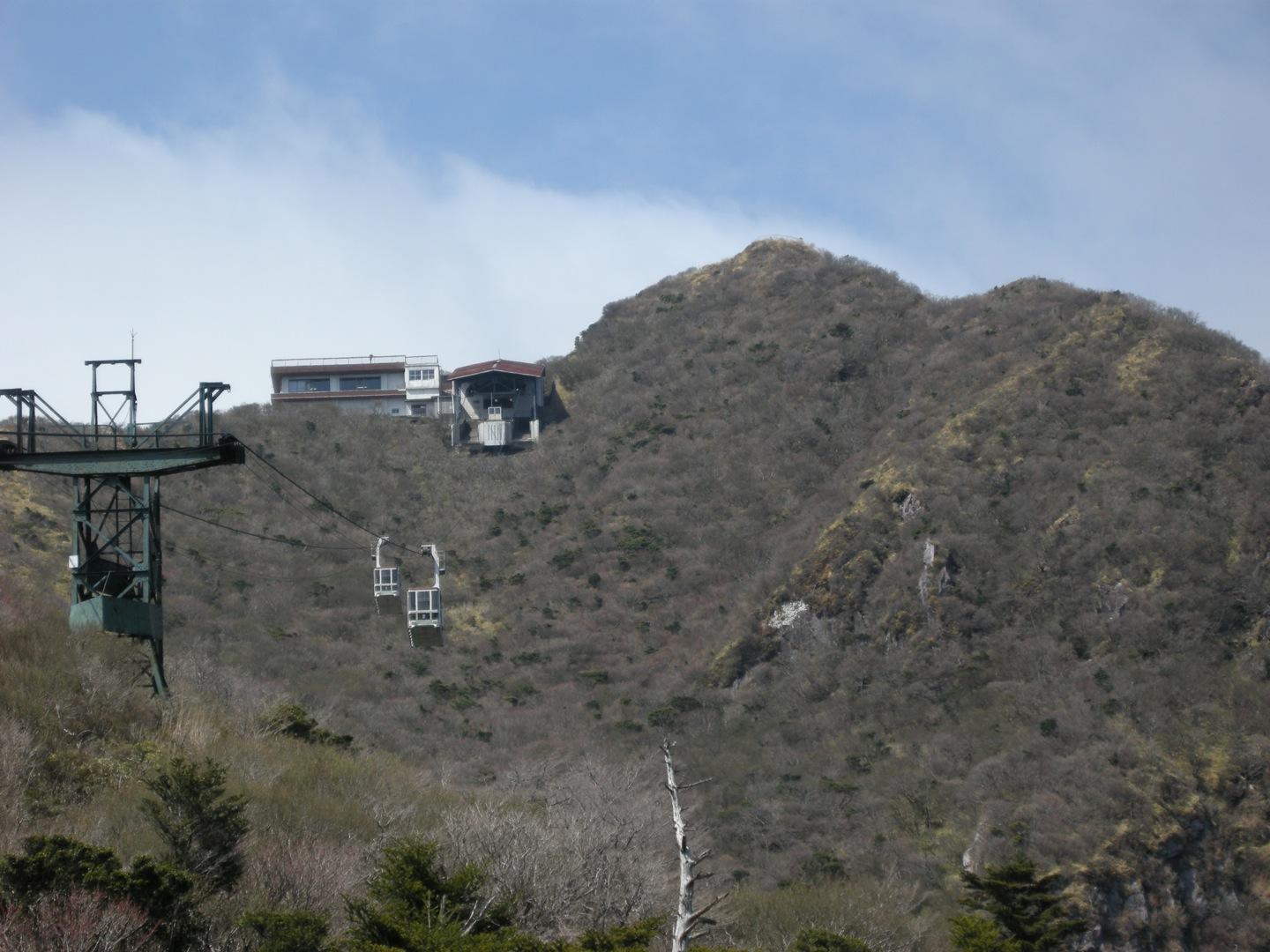
Unzen Ropeway on an active volcano

=== Ōita Prefecture ===
- Beppu Ropeway ^{T}; Beppu Ropeway

=== Nagasaki Prefecture ===
- Nagasaki Ropeway and Aquarium
  - Nagasaki Ropeway ^{T}
  - Inasayama Slope Car
- Unzen Ropeway ^{T}

=== Kumamoto Prefecture ===
- Mt. Aso Ropeway ^{T}; Kyūshū Sankō Tourism
- Sensuikyō Ropeway ^{T}; Higashi Aso Kankō Kaihatsu

== See also ==
- List of aerial tramways
- List of gondola lifts
- List of railway companies in Japan
- List of railway lines in Japan
- List of railway stations in Japan
- List of railway electrification systems in Japan
- Rail transport in Japan
- Monorails in Japan
- Slope car
- List of airport people mover systems
- List of bus operating companies in Japan
- List of defunct railway companies in Japan
