= Kitayatsugatake Ropeway =

Coordinates: 36°4′25.9″N 138°18′44.7″E

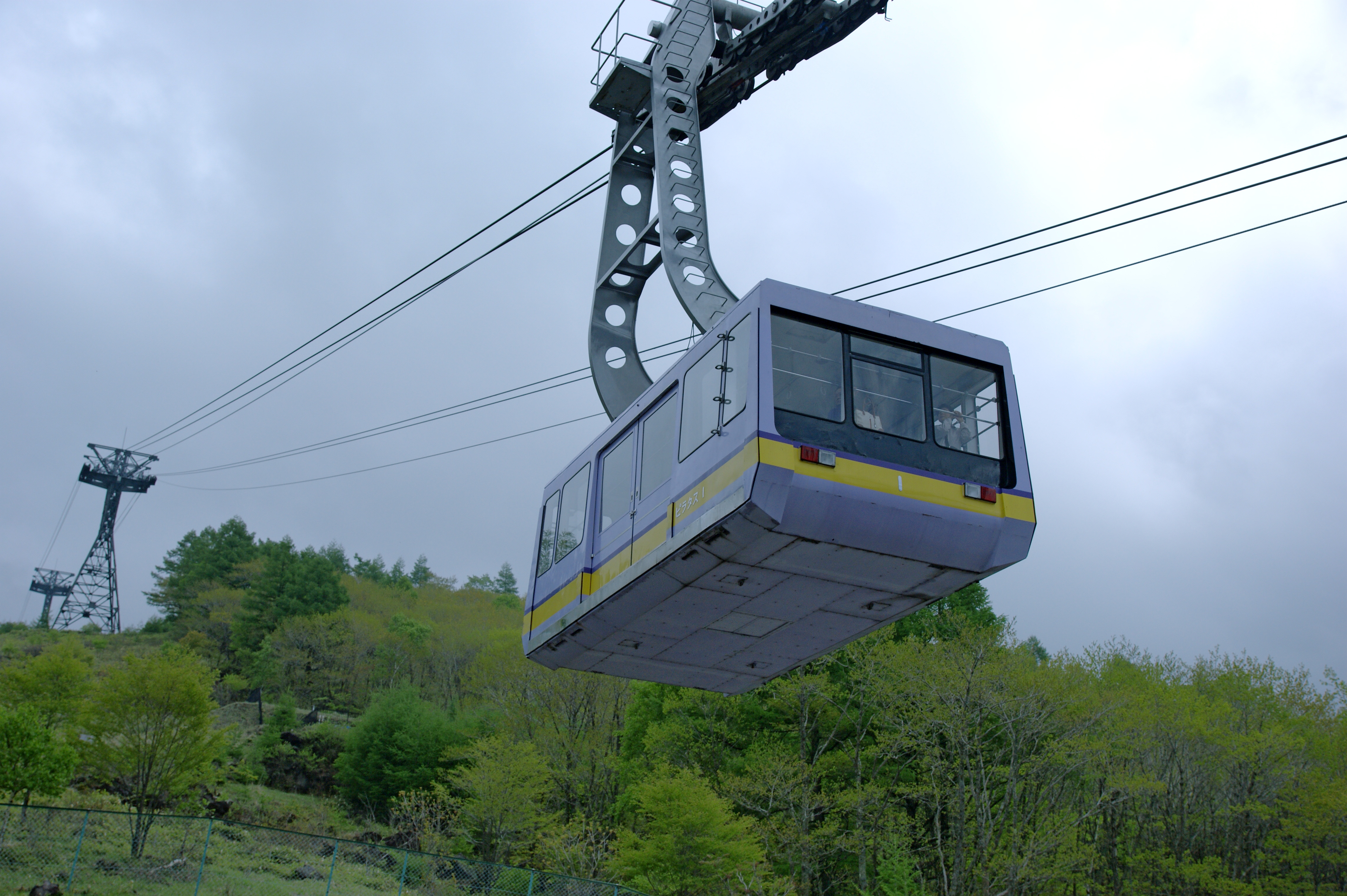
Kitayatsugatake Ropeway

The Kitayatsugatake Ropeway (北八ヶ岳ロープウエイ, Kitayatsugatake Rōpuwei) is the name of a Japanese aerial lift line (known until 2012 as Piratasu Tateshina Ropeway) in Chino, Nagano, as well as its operator. The company also operates Pilatus Tateshina Snow Resort, a ski area served by the line. The company operates Tateshina Kōgen Art Museum at the submontane station as well. Opened in 1967, the line climbs Tateshina Highland (蓼科高原), transporting skiers and rime spectators in winter, hikers in other seasons. The observatory has a view of the Yatsugatake Mountains and Southern Alps.

== Basic data ==
- System: Aerial tramway, 3 cables
- Cable length: 2.1 kilometres (1.3 mi)
- Vertical interval: 466 m (1,529 ft)
- Maximum gradient: 25°45′
- Operational speed: 7.0 m/s
- Passenger capacity per a cabin: 100
- Cabins: 2
- Stations: 2
- Duration of one-way trip: 7 minutes

== See also ==
- List of aerial lifts in Japan
