= Matsuyama Castle Ropeway =

Aerial lift line in Matsuyama, Japan

Coordinates: 33°50′40″N 132°46′19″E

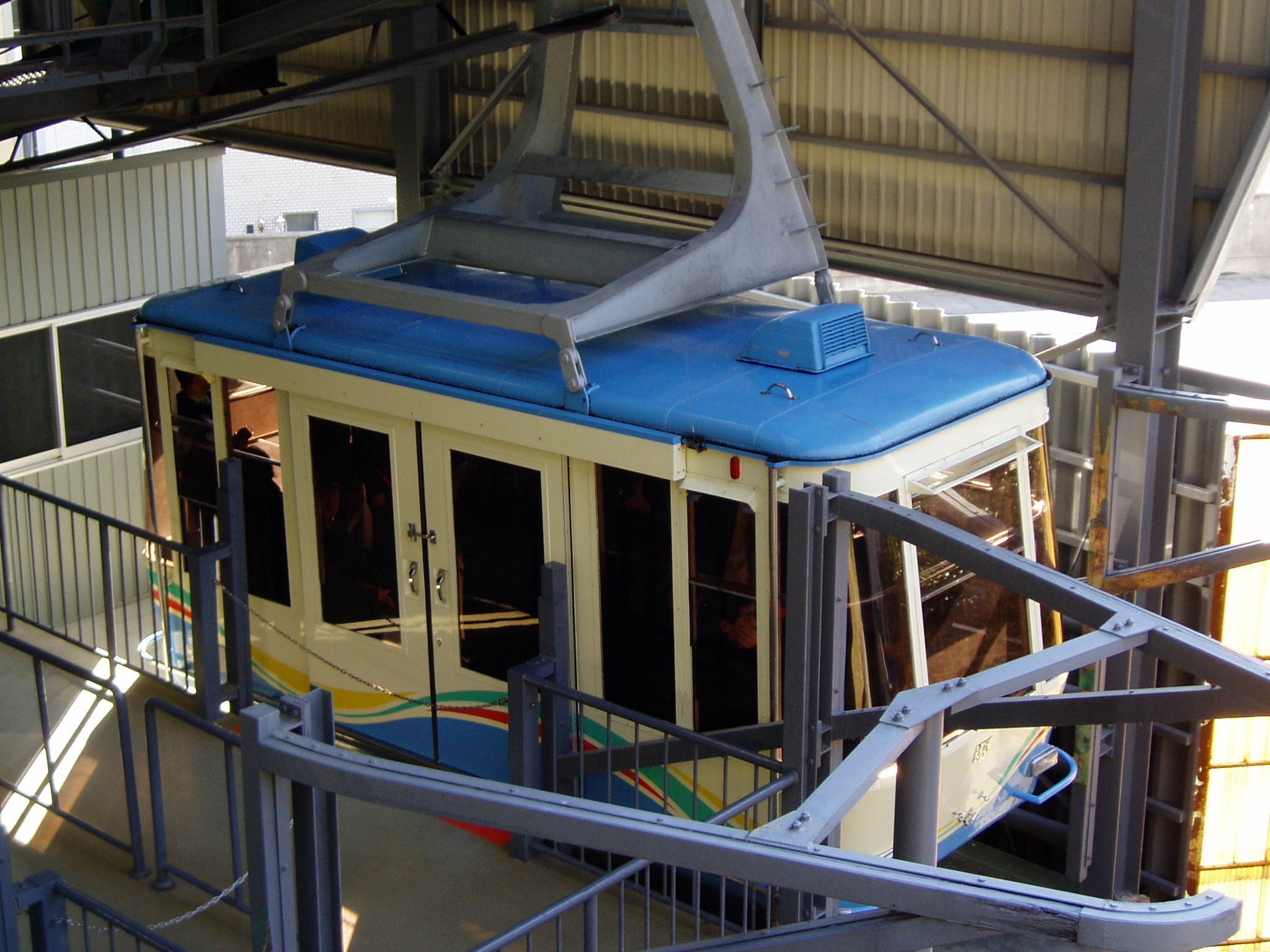
- Interactive map of Matsuyama Castle Ropeway

Overview
- Status: Operational
- Character: Aerial tramway
- Location: Matsuyama, Ehime, Japan
- No. of stations: 2

Operation
- Carrier capacity: 35 Passengers per cabin, 2 cabins
- Trip duration: 3 min

Technical features
- Line length: 327 m (1,073 ft)
- No. of cables: 2 track cables and 2 haulage ropes
- Operating speed: 3.6 m/s
- Vertical Interval: 62 m (203 ft)
- Maximum Gradient: 23°08′

The Matsuyama Castle Ropeway (松山城ロープウェイ, Matsuyamajō Rōpuwei) is a Japanese aerial lift line in Matsuyama, Ehime, operated by the city government. Opened in 1955, the line goes to Matsuyama Castle on Mount Katsuyama. The former cabins were famous for being decorated like Edo period litter vehicles. There is also a chairlift line parallel to and beside the tramway.

In February 2024, the ropeway was refurbished. The current lifts are the sixth generation of cabins to exist on the line.

== Basic data ==
- Cable length: 327 m (1,073 ft)
- Vertical interval: 62 m (203 ft)
- Carrier capacity: 35 passengers (including operator)
- Stations:
  - Shinonome-guchi Station
  - Chōjaganaru Station

== See also ==
- List of aerial lifts in Japan
