= Yawatayama Ropeway =

Ropeway in Shiga Prefecture, Japan

Coordinates: 35°8′33″N 136°5′9.8″E

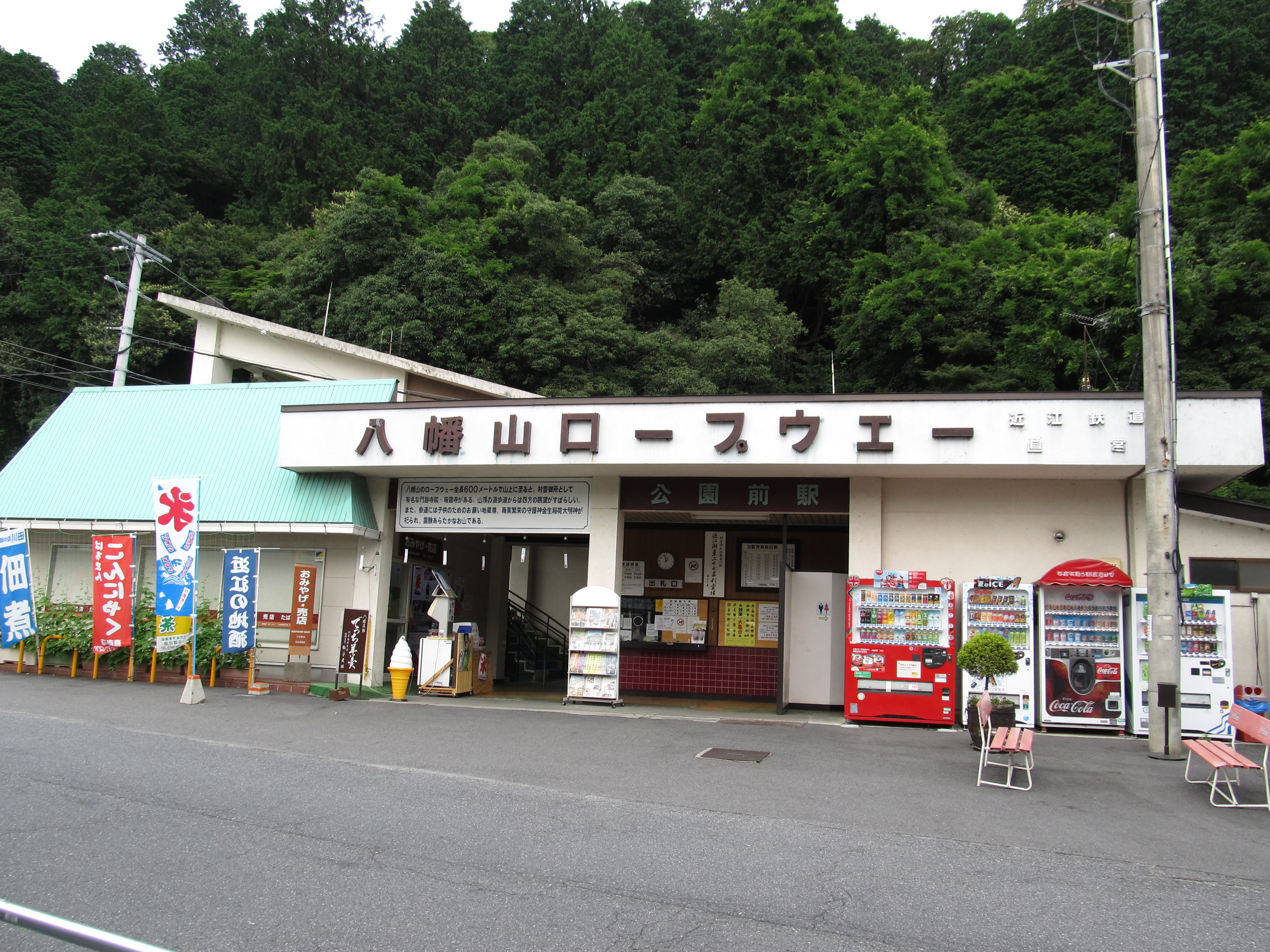
Hachimanyama Ropeway Koen-mae station in Omi-Hachiman city, Shiga prefecture

The Hachimanyama Ropeway (八幡山ロープウェー, Hachiman'yama Rōpuwē) is a Japanese aerial lift line in Ōmihachiman, Shiga, operated by Ohmi Railway. Opened in 1962, the line climbs Mount Hachiman, where there was Hachiman Castle built by Toyotomi Hidetsugu. The observatory has a view of Lake Biwa, as well as the city of Ōmihachiman, known for its traditional buildings lasting from Edo period.

== Basic data ==
- System: Aerial tramway, 3 cables
- Cable length: 543 m (1,781 ft)
- Vertical interval: 157 m (515 ft)
- Passenger capacity per a cabin: 25
- Cabins: 2
- Stations: 2
- Duration of one-way trip: 4 minutes
- Departure frequency: every 15 minutes, 9:00 to 17:00 (last upbound at 16:30), every day of the year. Continuous operation for groups or large numbers of passengers

A lover's sanctuary was installed at the summit in 2014, featuring photo spots with heart symbols and the English word LOVE.

== See also ==
- List of aerial lifts in Japan
