= Mount Inasa =

Hill near Nagasaki, Kyushu, Japan

- 稲佐山 Inasa-yama
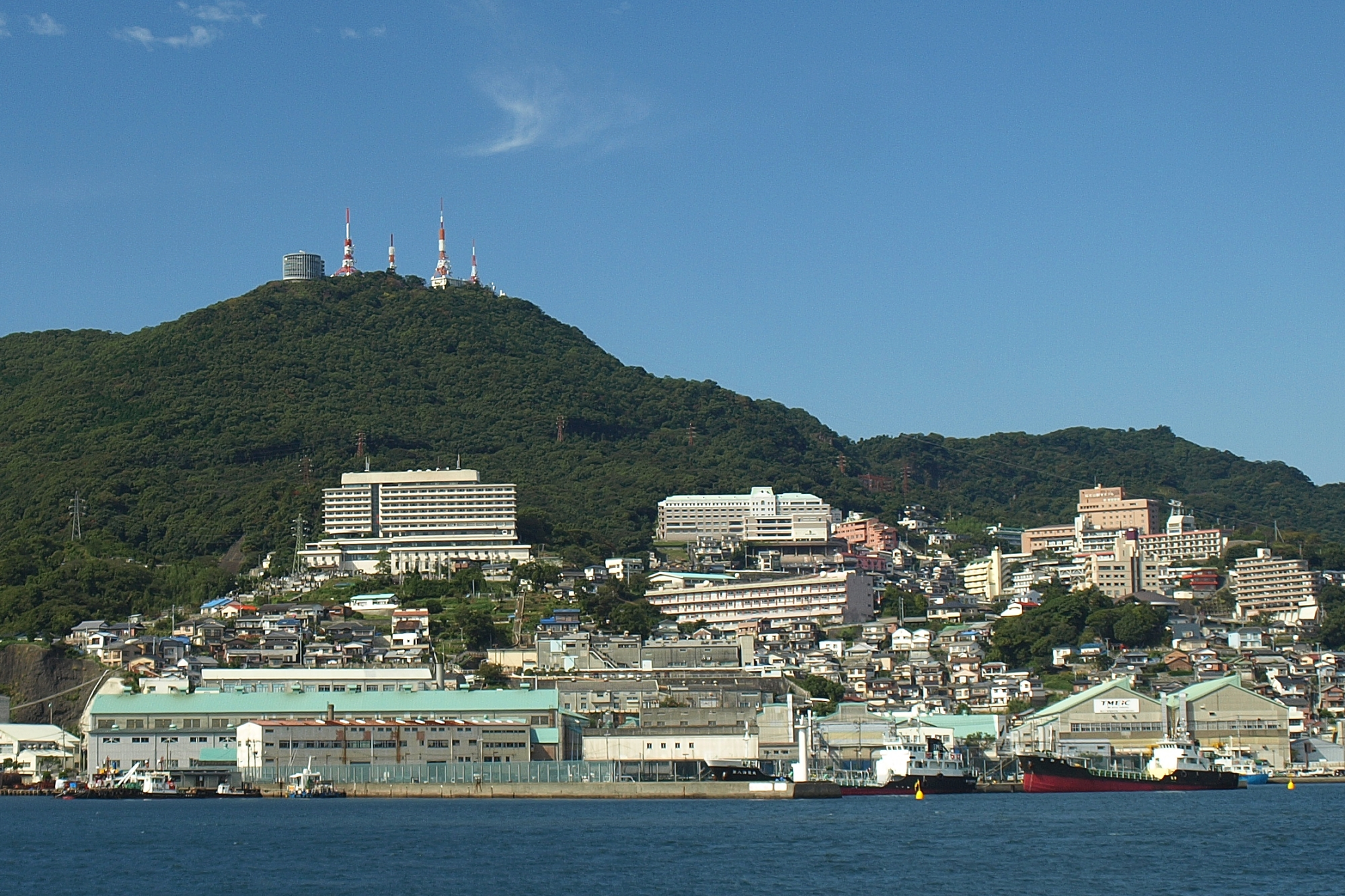
- View of Mount Inasa from Nagasaki Harbor.

Highest point
- Elevation: 333 m (1,093 ft)
- Coordinates: 32°45′10″N 129°50′58″E

Geography
- Location within Japan
- Location: Nagasaki, Nagasaki Prefecture, Japan

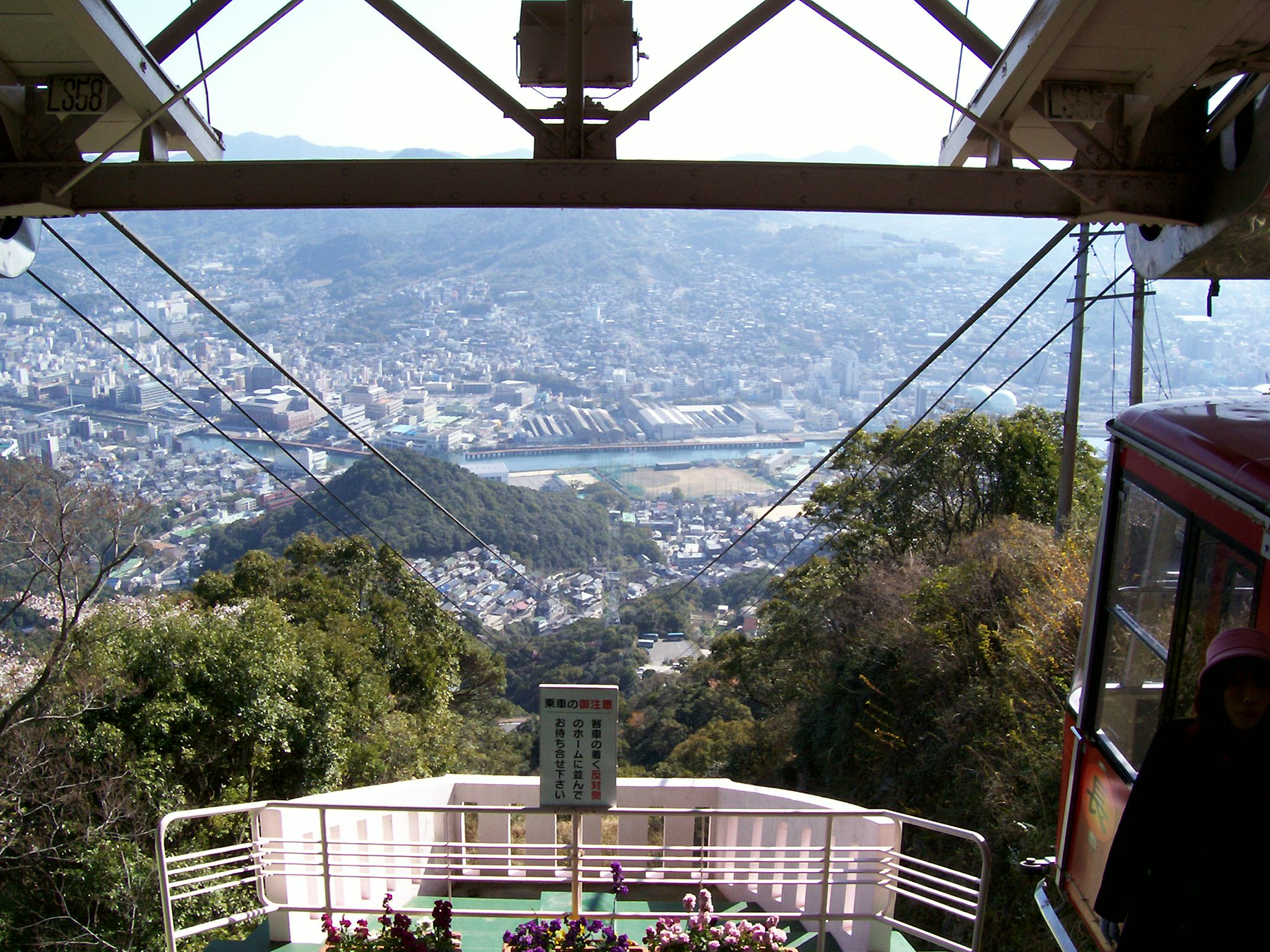
View of Nagasaki from Mt Inasa

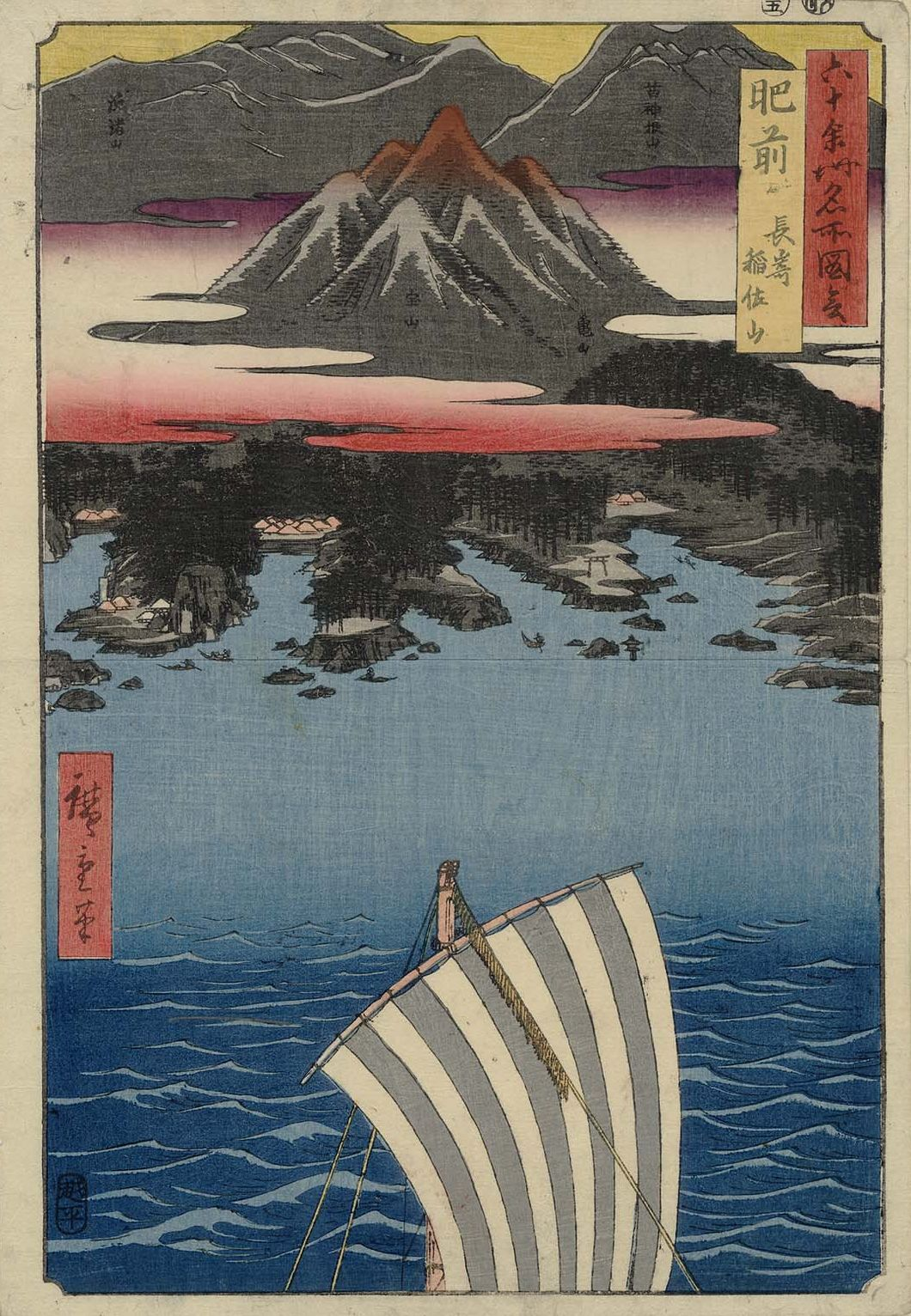
Hiroshige

Mount Inasa (稲佐山, Inasa-yama) is a hill to the west of Nagasaki which rises to a height of 333 metres (1,093 ft).

The Nagasaki Ropeway and the Nagasaki Inasa Mountain Slope Car (in Japanese) allow visitors to easily travel to the summit. A short walk from the top ropeway and slope car stations (adjacent to each other) is Mt. Inasa Overlook, a multi-level observation deck with "360-degree panoramic view" from the rooftop.

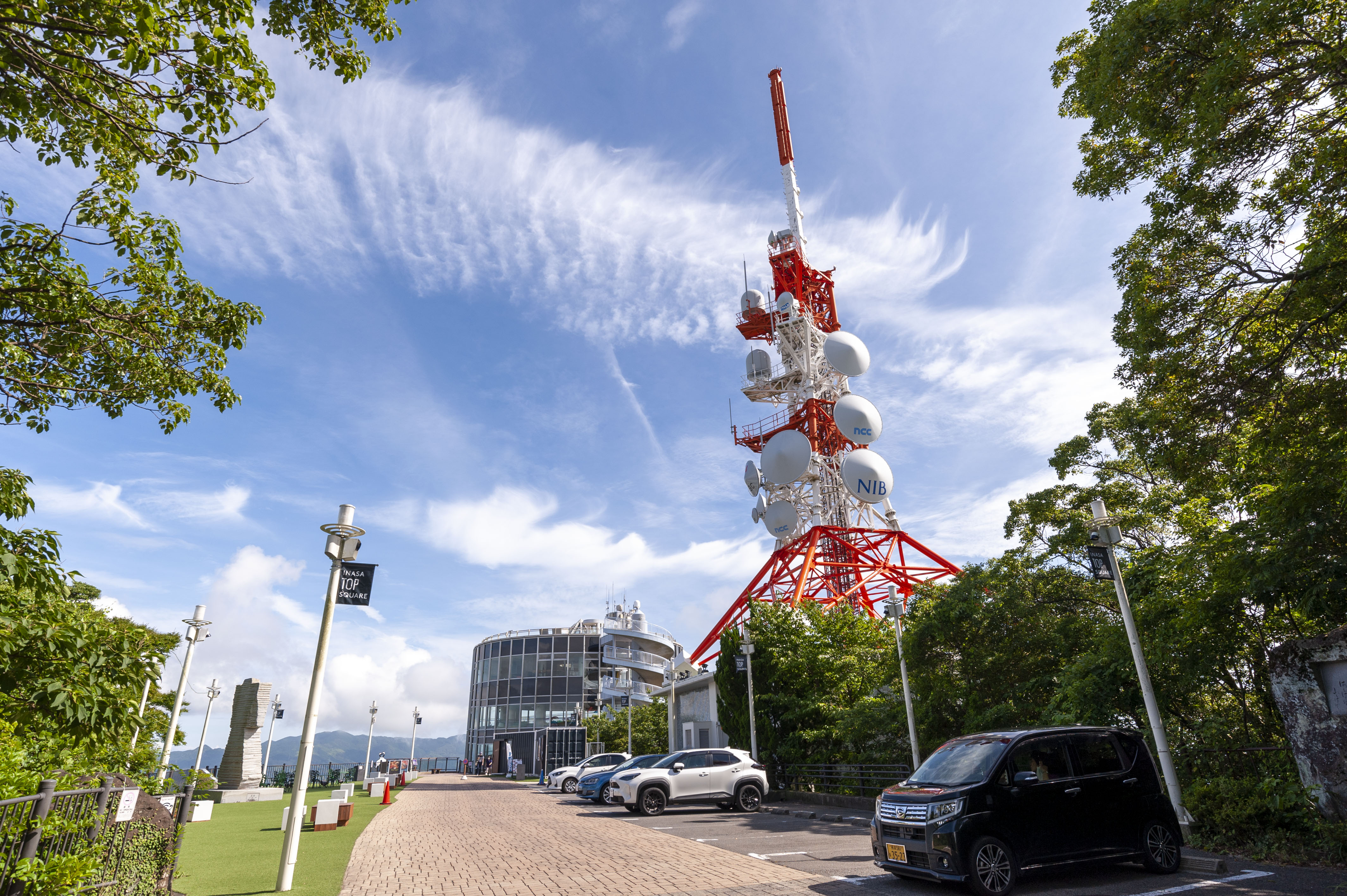
稲佐山山頂展望台周辺

Nagasaki's night view was certified as one of the "World's New Three Great Night Views" by the Night View Summit held in 2021, organized by the Night View Tourism Convention Bureau. The panoramic night view from Mt. Inasa is known as Nagasaki's "10 Million Dollar Night View" (1000万ドルの夜景, Issenmandoru no yakei).

In the lower level of the observation deck there is a restaurant Mount Inasa Restaurant ITADAKI.

There are also several buildings that house transmitters for TV and radio stations that serve Nagasaki and the surrounding area.

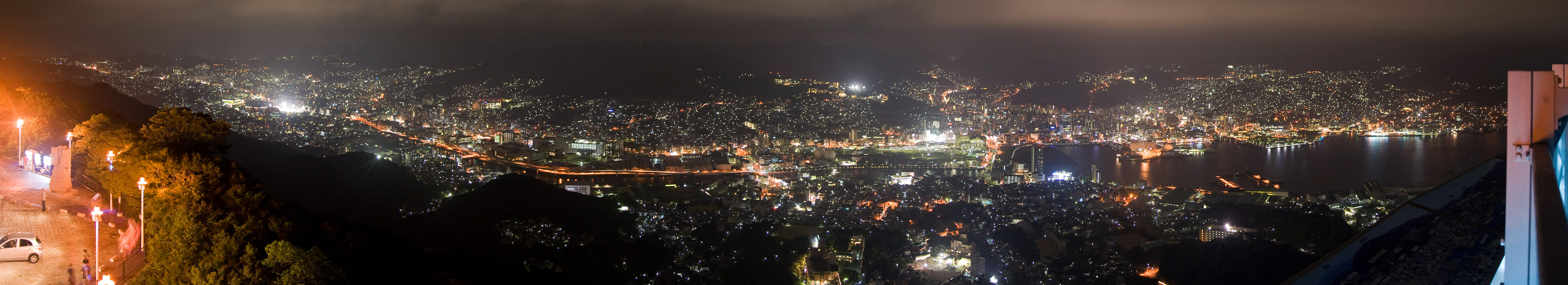
View of the night skyline from the top of Mount Inasa.

== Inasayama Park ==
Inasayama Park has a playground area, a grass ski resort, an outdoor stage, etc.

Outdoor stage In the park, there is an outdoor stage with lawn seats that can accommodate 15,000 people. It was built on the occasion of the '90 Nagasaki Travel Expo, and the environment was improved in the wake of the free outdoor concert "Summer Nagasaki kara Sadamasashi" (1987-2006) by Sadamasashi from the local Nagasaki. In addition to Masaharu Fukuyama (2000, 2009, 2015), who is also from the local area, Ken Hirai, MISIA, and many other artists have given concerts, "Sky Jamboree" It is a major venue for outdoor concerts in Kyushu. In addition, Fukuyama has made his song "Promised Hill" the official song of Inasayama. Monkey House and Deer Ranch In 1990 (Heisei 2), "Monkey House" and "Deer Ranch" were developed.

== See also ==
- Nagasaki Ropeway
- Nagasaki Inasa Mountain Slope Car (in Japanese)
