= Tairyūji Ropeway =

Aerial lift line in Tokushima, Japan

Coordinates: 33°52′51.3″N 134°31′16.8″E

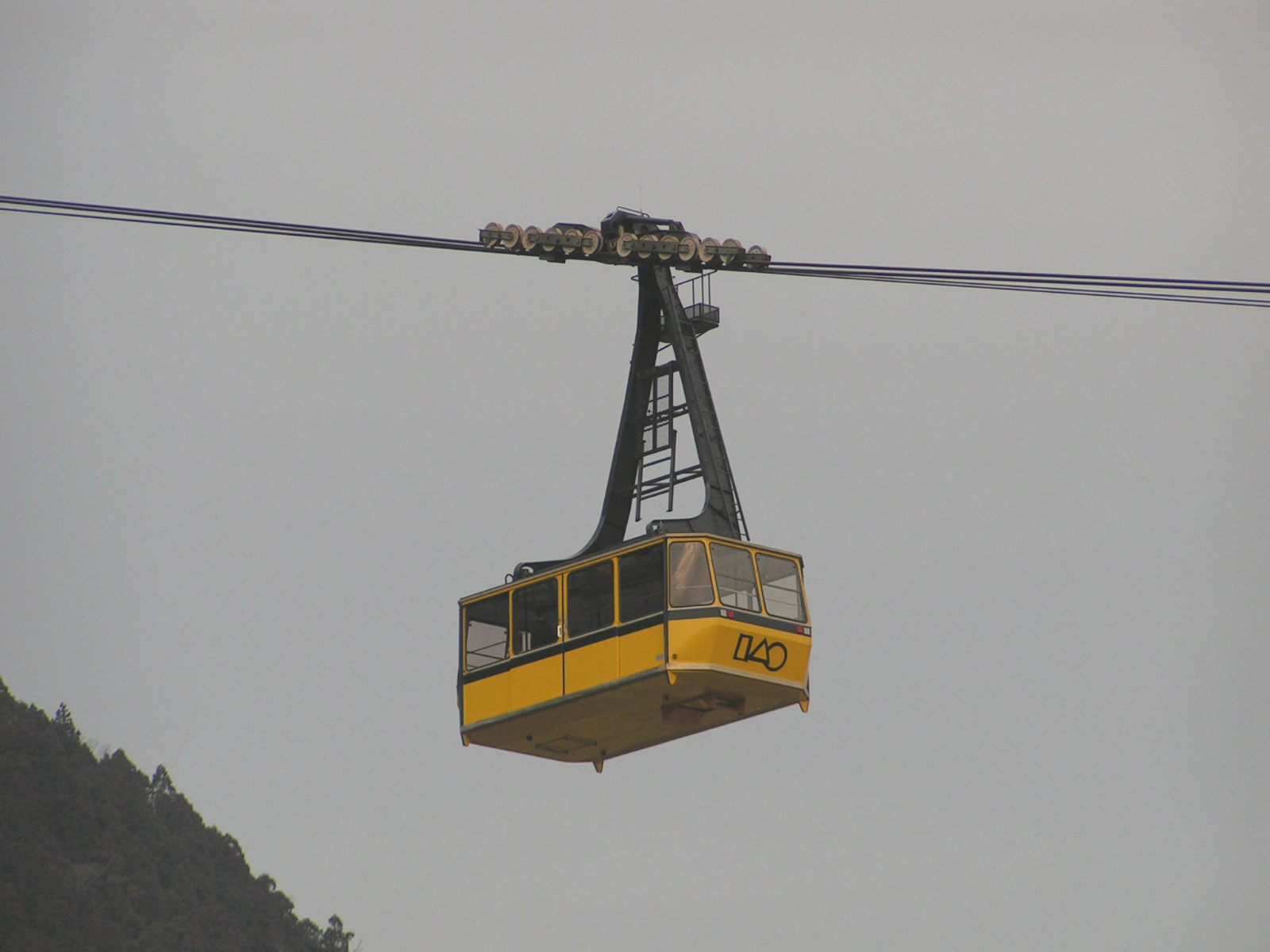
Tairyūji Ropeway.

The Tairyūji Ropeway (太龍寺ロープウェイ, Tairyūji Rōpuwei) is a Japanese aerial lift line in Tokushima Prefecture, operated by Shikoku Cable. Opened in 1992, the line climbs to Tairyū-ji, the 21st temple of the Shikoku Pilgrimage.

== Basic data ==
- System: Aerial tramway, 2 track cables and 2 haulage ropes
- Distance: 2.7 kilometres (1.7 mi)
- Vertical interval
  - Between two ends: 422 m (1,385 ft)
  - Maximum: 508 m (1,667 ft)
- Maximum gradient: 30°
- Operational speed: 5.0 m/s
- Passenger capacity per a cabin: 101
- Stations: 2
- Time required for single ride: 10 minutes

== See also ==
- List of aerial lifts in Japan
