= Unpenji Ropeway =

Aerial lift line in Kagawa Prefecture, Japan

Coordinates: 34°2′12.7″N 133°43′22.1″E

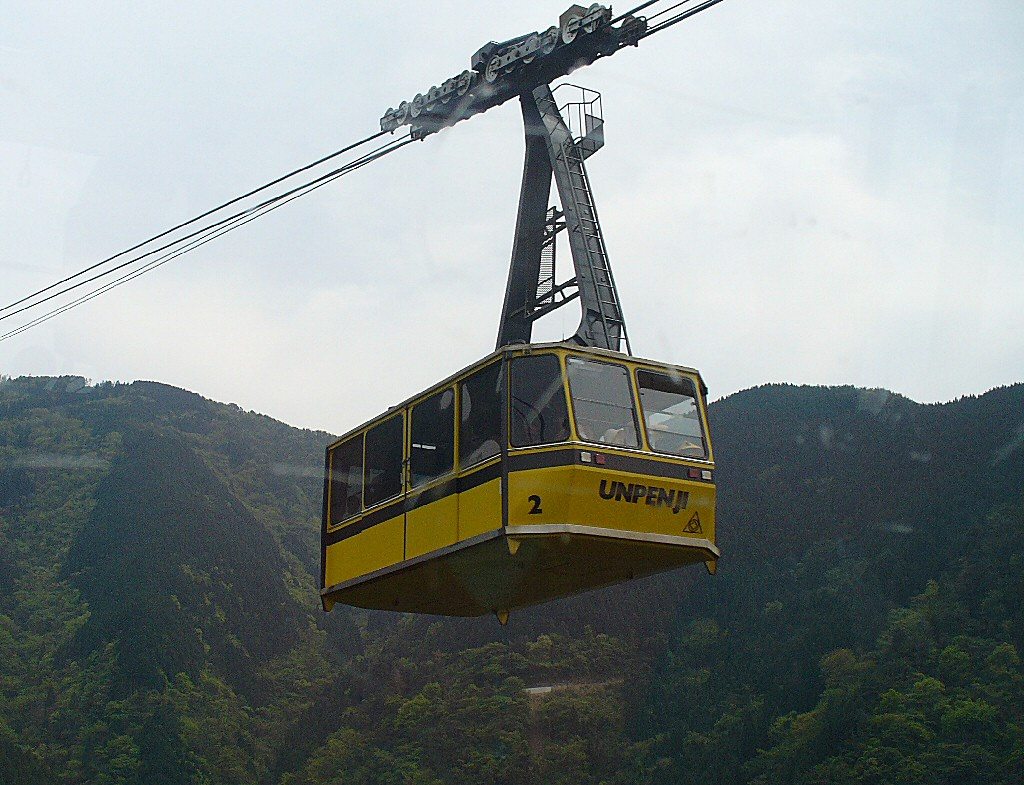
Unpenji Ropeway

The Unpenji Ropeway (雲辺寺ロープウェイ, Unpenji Rōpuwei) is a Japanese aerial lift line in Kan'onji, Kagawa, operated by Shikoku Cable. Opened in 1987, the line climbs to Unpen-ji, the 66th temple of Shikoku Pilgrimage. The temple is at the highest altitude point of the entire pilgrimage. At the summit, Shikoku Cable also operates Snow Park Unpenji, a ski resort, as well as Wind Park Unpenji, a paragliding field.

== Basic data ==
- System: Aerial tramway, 2 track cables and 2 haulage ropes
- Distance: 2.6 kilometres (1.6 mi)
- Span: 1.9 kilometres (1.2 mi), the longest in Japan
- Vertical interval: 657 m (2,156 ft)
- Operational speed: 10 m/s, the fastest in Japan
- Passenger capacity per a cabin: 101
- Stations: 2
- Time required for single ride: 7 minutes

== See also ==
- List of aerial lifts in Japan
