= Sumaura Ropeway =

Japanese aerial lift

Coordinates: 34°38′20.9″N 135°5′54.7″E

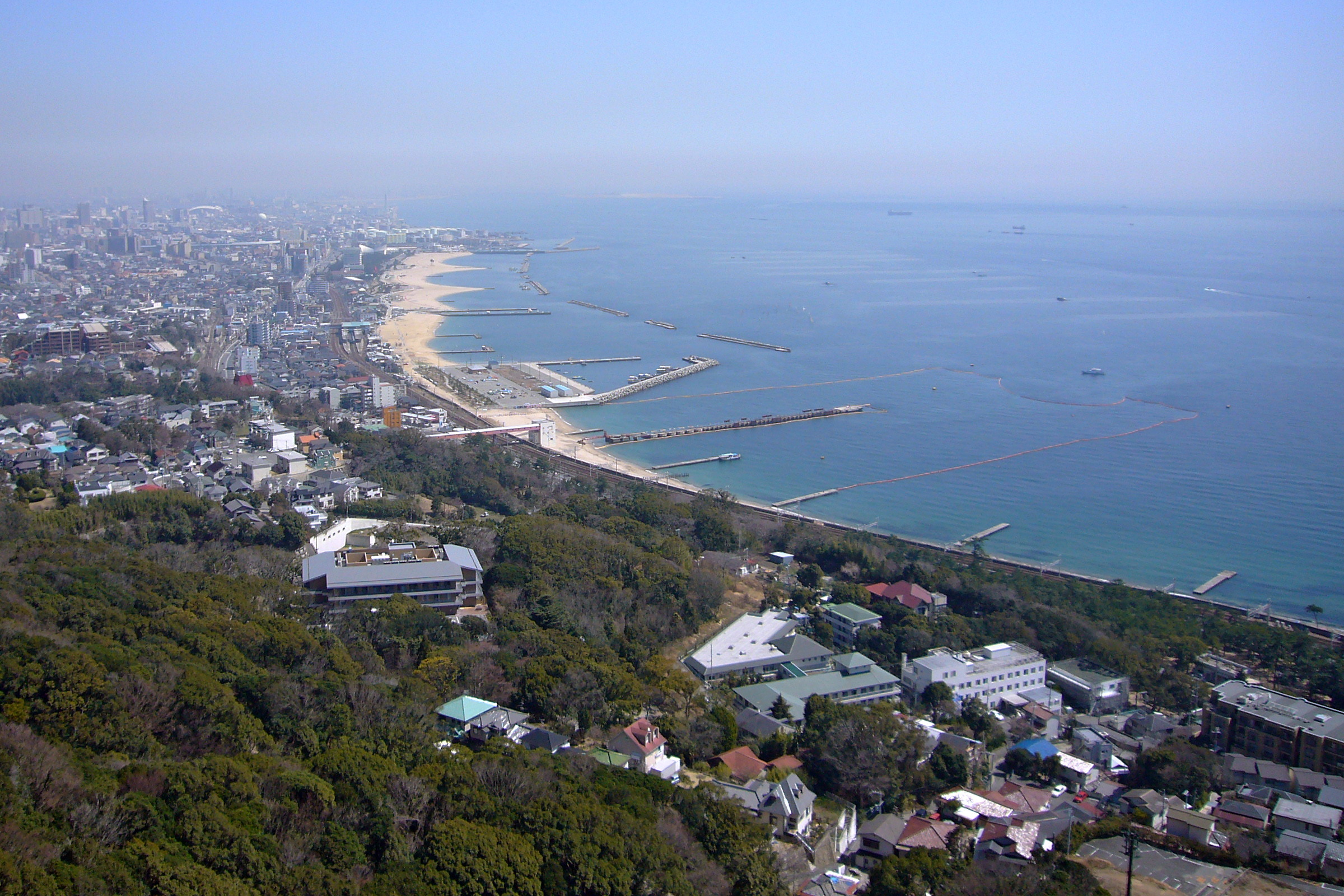
A view from the cabin.

The Sumaura Ropeway (須磨浦ロープウェイ, Sumaura Rōpuwei) is a Japanese aerial lift line in Kōbe, Hyōgo, operated by the Sanyō Electric Railway. Opened in 1957, the line climbs Mount Hachibuse, a 246-metre (807 ft) peak on the Suma coast.

At the summit, there is a transfer to the Carlator (カーレーター, Kārētā), a ride that transports people using large baskets on an inclined conveyor belt. Opened on March 18, 1966, its name is a portmanteau of "car" and "escalator" and takes riders from the ropeway's top station up a steep 91-metre (299 ft) slope. The two-seat vehicles famously rattle and vibrate on their way up in a way the operator describes as "uncomfortable".

== Basic data ==
- System: Aerial tramway, 1 track cable and 2 haulage ropes
- Distance: 464 metres (1,522 ft)
- Vertical interval: 180 metres (590 ft)
- Passenger capacity per cabin: 30
- Cabins: 2
- Stations: 2

== See also ==
- List of aerial lifts in Japan
