= Unzen Ropeway =

Coordinates: 32°45′9.8″N 130°17′9.3″E

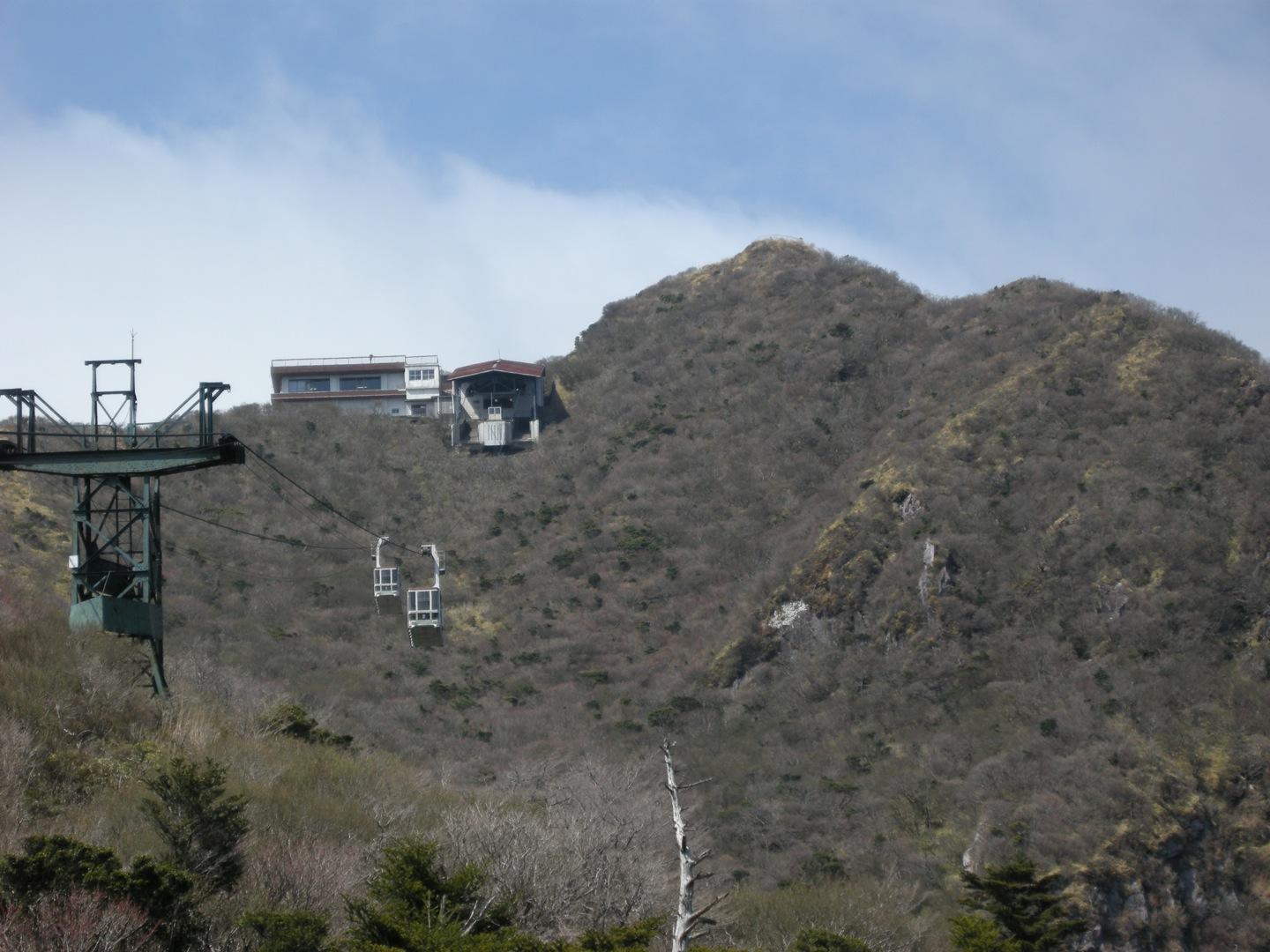
Unzen Ropeway

The Unzen Ropeway (雲仙ロープウェイ, Unzen Rōpuwei) is the name of Japanese aerial lift line, as well as its operator. Opened in 1957, the line climbs Myōken Peak of Mount Unzen, Unzen, Nagasaki. It attracts visitors with the view of the surrounding nature, especially azaleas in spring and autumn colors in autumn.

== Basic data ==
- System: Aerial tramway, 1 track cable and 2 haulage ropes
- Cable length: 481 m (1,578 ft)
- Vertical interval: 145 m (476 ft)
- Maximum gradient: 30°40′
- Operational speed: 3.6 m/s
- Passenger capacity per a cabin: 36
- Cabins: 2
- Stations: 2
- Duration of one-way trip: 3 minutes

== See also ==
- List of aerial lifts in Japan
