= Yuzawa Kōgen Ropeway =

Aerial lift in Yuzawa, Niigata, Japan

Coordinates: 36°56′20″N 138°47′53.4″E

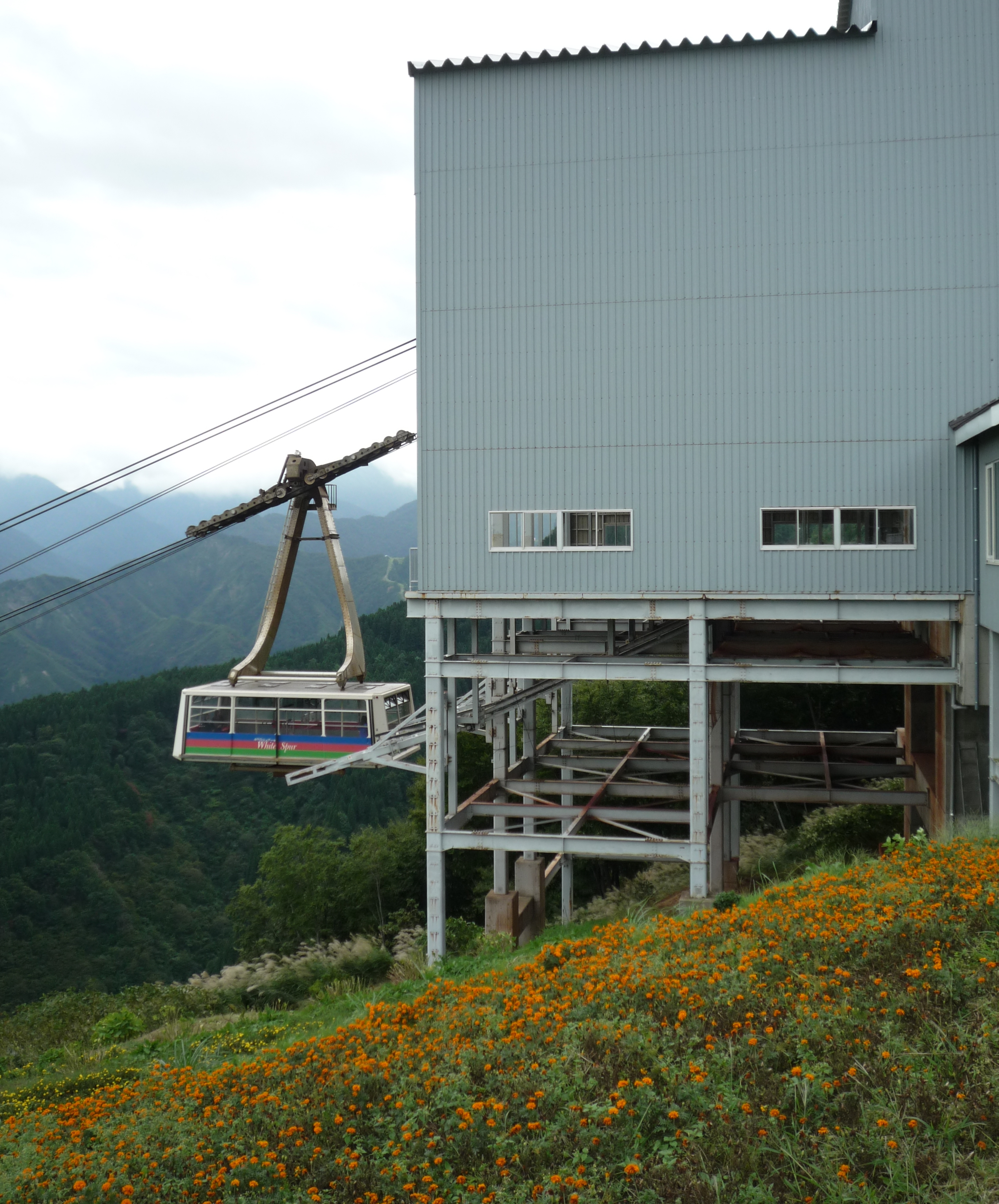
"White Spur" arriving to Panorama Station

The Yuzawa Kōgen Ropeway (湯沢高原ロープウェイ, Yuzawa Kōgen Rōpuwei, "Yuzawa Highland Ropeway"), officially the Yuzawa Onsen Ropeway (湯沢温泉ロープウェイ, Yuzawa Onsen Rōpuwei, "Yuzawa Hot Spring Ropeway"), is Japanese aerial lift line in Yuzawa, Niigata, operated by Snow Resort Service (スノーリゾートサービス, Sunō Rizōto Sābisu). The line runs in the town of the huge ski resort complex, but it also transports hikers in other seasons. It opened in 1991.

== Basic data ==
- System: Aerial tramway, 2 track cables and 2 haulage ropes
- Cable length: 1,303 m (4,275 ft)
- Vertical interval: 500 m (1,640 ft)
- Maximum gradient: 31°07′
- Operational speed: 5.0 m/s
- Passenger capacity per a cabin: 166
  - The largest in Japan.
- Cabins: 2
- Stations: 2
- Duration of one-way trip: 7 minutes
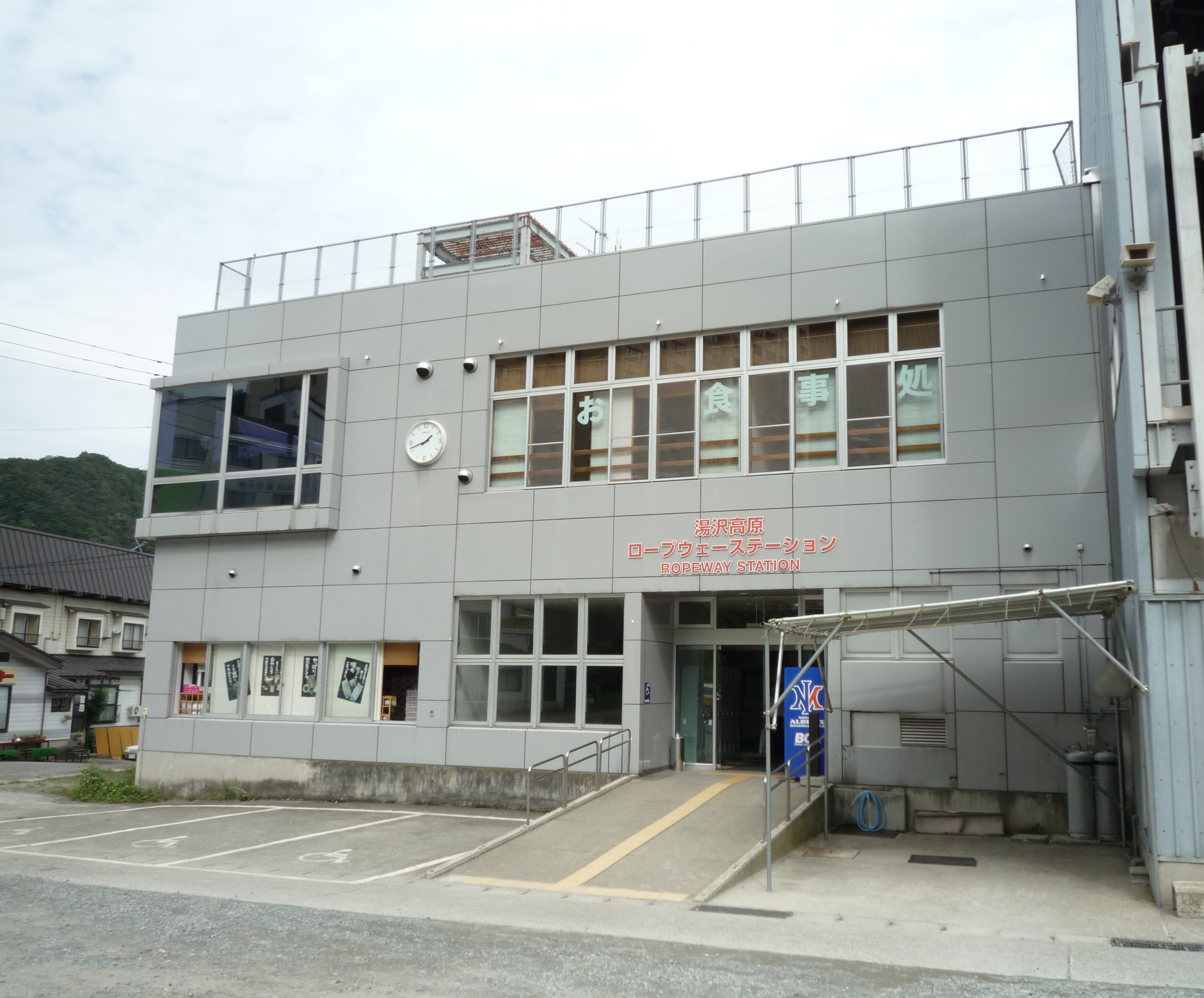
Ropeway Station

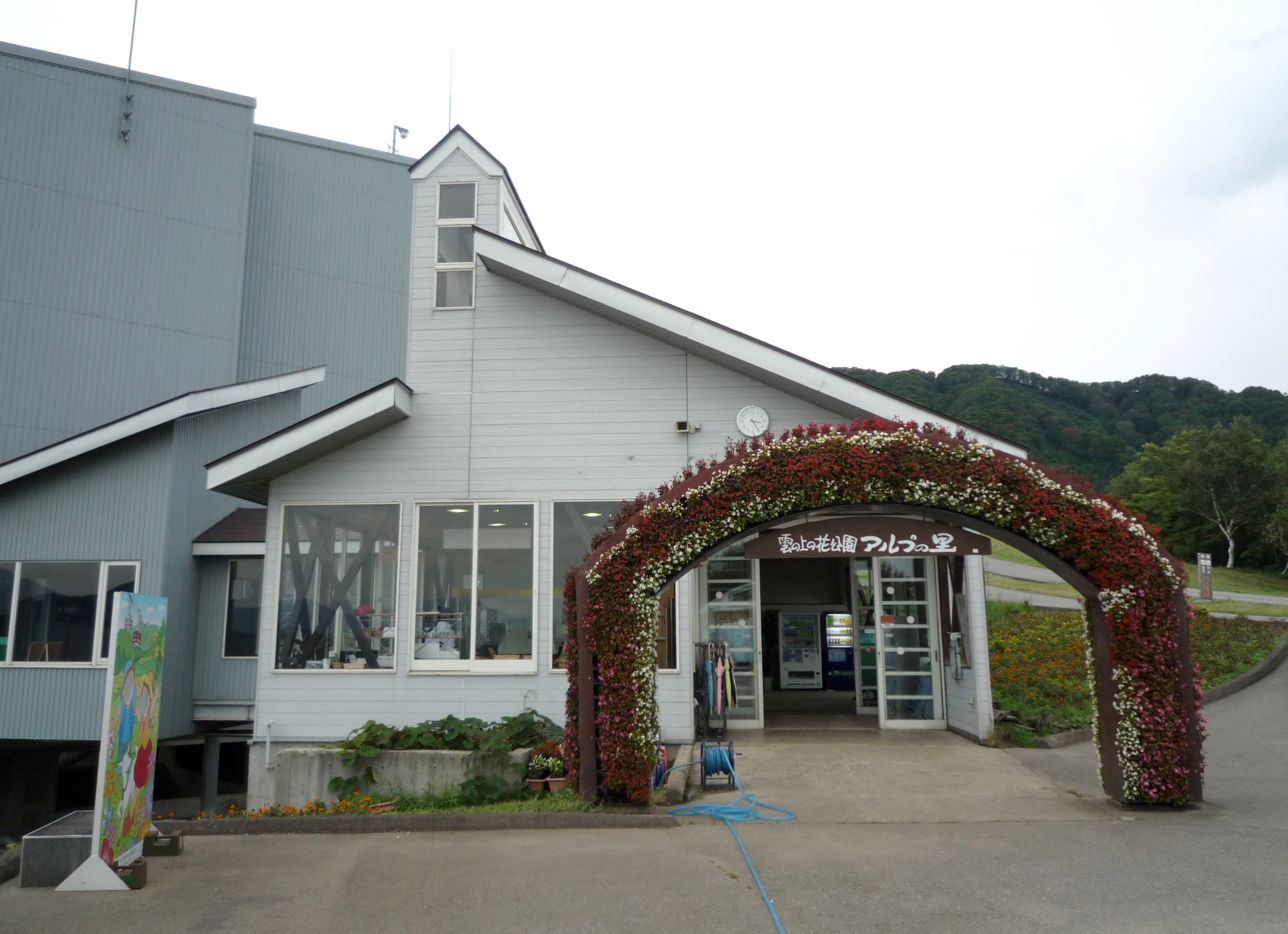
Panorama Station

== See also ==
- List of aerial lifts in Japan
