= Mount Shosha Ropeway =

Aerial lift in Japan

Coordinates: 34°52′53.3″N 134°39′51.4″E

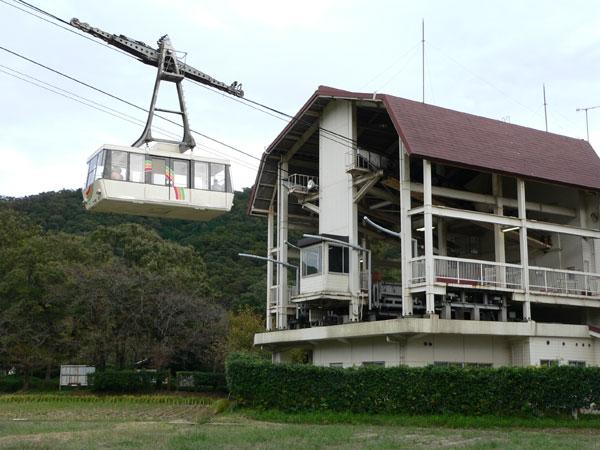
- Interactive map of Mount Shosha Ropeway

Overview
- Status: Operational
- Character: Aerial tramway
- Location: Himeji, Hyōgo, Japan
- No. of stations: 2
- Open: 1958

Operation
- Operator: Shinki Bus
- Carrier capacity: 71 Passengers per cabin, 2 cabins
- Trip duration: 4 min

Technical features
- Line length: 781 m (2,562 ft)
- No. of cables: 1 track cable and 2 haulage ropes
- Operating speed: 5 m/s
- Vertical Interval: 210 m (689 ft)

The Mt. Shosha Ropeway (書写山ロープウェイ, Shoshazan Rōpuwei) is a Japanese aerial lift line in Himeji, Hyōgo, operated by the city government. The actual operation is entrusted to Shinki Bus (神姫バス), a local bus company. Opened in 1958, the line climbs Mount Shosha of Engyō-ji, a famous temple.

== Basic data ==
- Cable length: 781 m (2,562 ft)
- Vertical interval: 210 m (689 ft)

== See also ==
- List of aerial lifts in Japan
