= Nagasaki Ropeway =

Ropeway (aerial lift) in Nagasaki, Japan

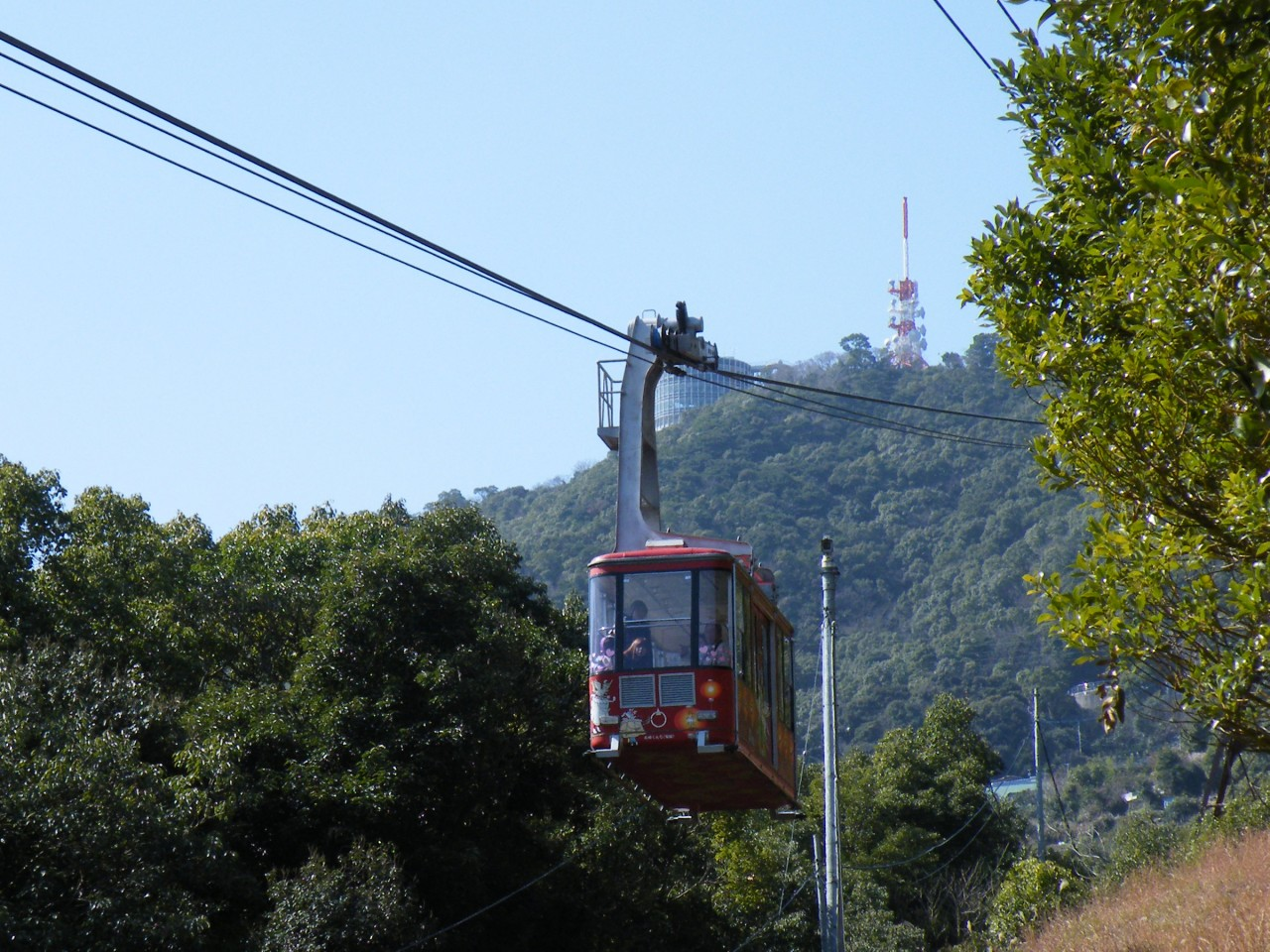
- Interactive map of Nagasaki Ropeway

Overview
- Status: Operational
- Character: Aerial tramway
- Location: Mount Inasa, Nagasaki, Nagasaki, Japan
- No. of stations: 2
- Open: 1958

Operation
- Operator: Nagasaki City
- Carrier capacity: 41 Passengers per cabin, 2 cabins
- Trip duration: 5 min

Technical features
- Line length: 1,090 m (3,576 ft)
- No. of cables: 1 track cable and 2 haulage ropes
- Cable diameter: Drive - 52mm Support - 22mm
- Operating speed: 5.0 m/s
- Vertical Interval: 298 m (978 ft)

The Nagasaki Ropeway (長崎ロープウェイ, Nagasaki Rōpuwei) is a Japanese aerial lift line, operated by Regional Creation Nagasaki Co., Ltd./Nagasaki Ropeway Business Consortium under contract to the City of Nagasaki. Opened in 1958, the line climbs Mount Inasa in Ohamamachi, to the west of the city of Nagasaki, Nagasaki Prefecture. The current cabins entered service in 2011 and were designed by Ken Okuyama Design.

Since January 31, 2020, Nagasaki Inasa Mountain Slope Car also traverses Mount Inasa, taking passengers from Chufuku Station, adjacent to Inasayama Park Parking Lot carpark and Inasayama Park bus stop (serviced by bus route 5 from JR Nagasaki Station), to Summit Station, adjacent to Nagasaki Ropeway Inasa Dake Station.

== Stations ==
- Lower Station: Fuchi Shrine Station (Fuchijinja Station). Adjacent to Fuchi Shrine.
  - Address: 8-1 Fuchimachi, Nagasaki City, 852-8012 ( 32°45'29" N 129°51'35"E )
  - From JR Nagasaki Station, take Nagasaki Bus Route 3 or 4 and alight at "Ropeway-mae" bus stop, then walk for 3 minutes
- Upper Station: Inasadake Station. Adjacent to Nagasaki Inasa Mountain Slope Car "Summit Station" and 180 metres (590 ft) from Mt. Inasa Overlook observation deck.
  - Address: 364-1 Inasa-cho, Nagasaki City, 852-8011 ( 32°45′15.2″ N 129°50′57.1″E )

== Services ==
Travel time is 5 minutes. Services departs both stations at the same time. Extra trips may operate in times of high passenger volume. The adjacent slope car operates to the same frequencies with a journey time of 8 minutes.

As of November 2024:
09:00-18:00	every 20 minutes
18:00-22:00	every 15 minutes
22:00 departure is downhill passengers only

== Basic data ==
- Cable length: 1,090 m (3,576 ft)
- Vertical interval: 298 m (978 ft)

== See also ==
- List of aerial lifts in Japan
- Mount Inasa
- Nagasaki Inasa Mountain Slope Car (in Japanese)
