= Izu Panorama Park =

Coordinates: 35°0′44.3″N 138°55′16.2″E

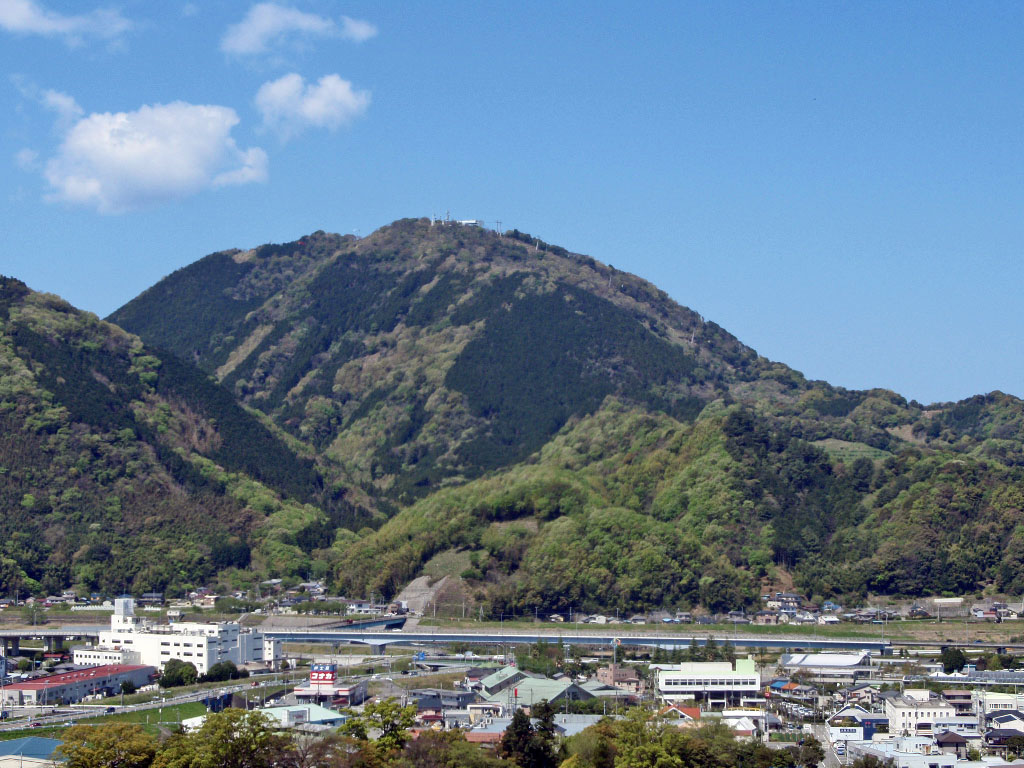
Mt. Katsuragi (Katsuragi-yama)

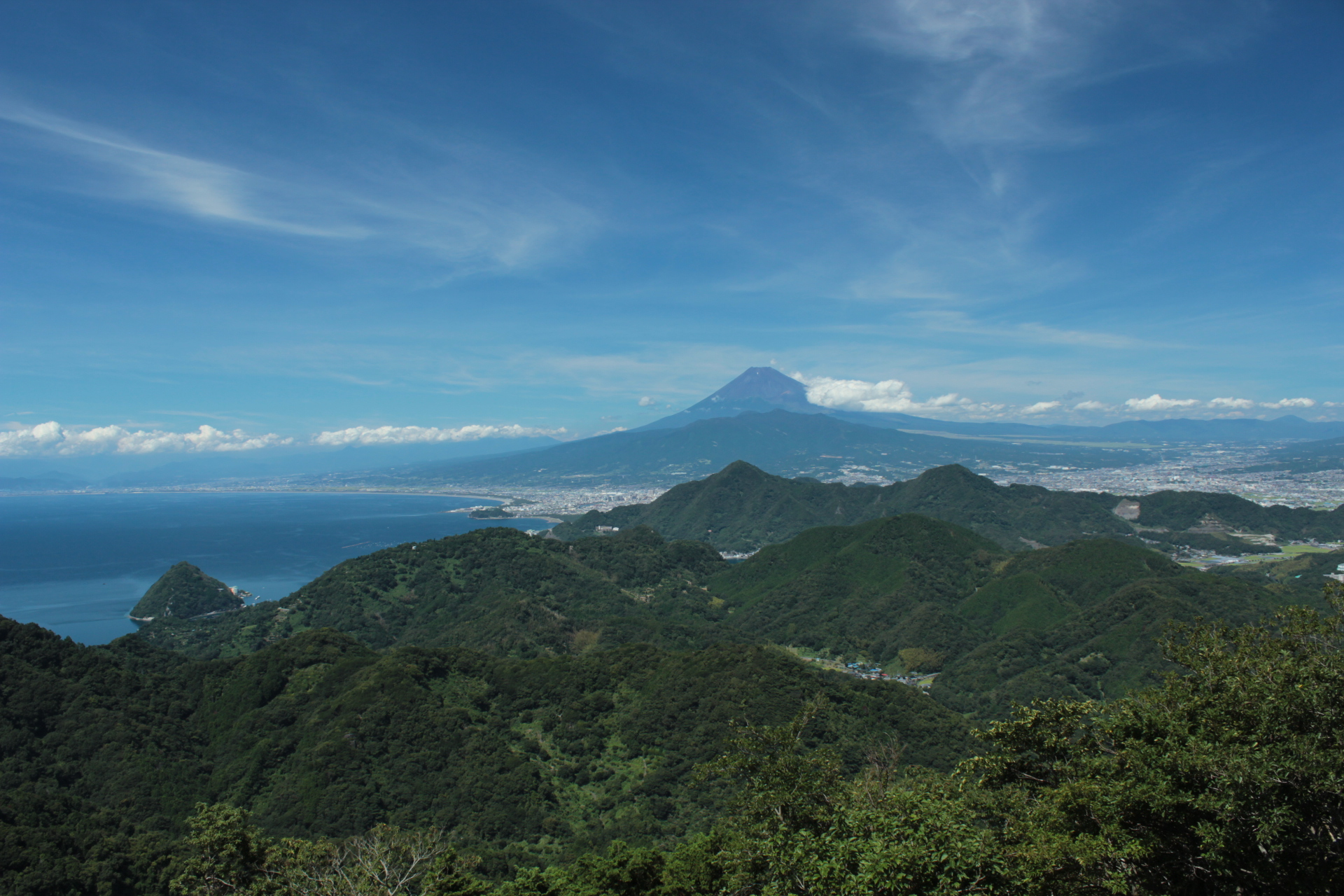
Viewed from Mount Katsuragi.

The Izui Panorama Park (伊豆パノラマパーク, Izu panorama pāku) is a tourist attraction located in Izunokuni, Shizuoka Prefecture, Japan. This tourist attraction is a complex facility with a ropeway, observatory, and restaurant.

== Access ==
The Izu Panorama Park Ropeway (伊豆パノラマパークロープウェイ, Izu panorama pāku rōpuwei), formerly known as the Katsuragiyama ropeway (かつらぎ山ロープウェイ, Katsuragiyama rōpuwei), is Japanese aerial lift line in Izunokuni, Shizuoka. The line, operated by Dainichi Co., Ltd. (大日株式会社, Dainichi kabushiki gaisha), has the official nickname of Skyride (スカイライド, Sukairaido). Opened in 1992, the line climbs Mount Katsuragi with the view of Mount Fuji.

=== Basic data ===
- Cable length: 1.8 kilometres (1.1 mi)
- Vertical interval: 411 m (1,348 ft)

== See also ==
- List of aerial lifts in Japan
