= Shikoku Cable =

Japanese transportation company

Shikoku Cable (四国ケーブル, Shikoku Kēburu) is a transportation company on Shikoku, Japan. Headquartered in Takamatsu, Kagawa, the company operates a funicular and aerial lifts.

== History ==
- June 26, 1964: Founded as Yakuri Cable.
- December 28, 1964: Yakuri Cable Line opens.
- November 14, 1970: The company is renamed as Yakuri Hashikura Cable.
- April 1, 1972: Hashikurasan Ropeway opens.
- March 28, 1987: Unpenji Ropeway opens.
- August 1, 1987: The company is renamed as Shikoku Cable.
- July 21, 1992: Tairyūji Ropeway opens.
- April 1, 1999: Hashikurasan Ropeway is spun off into a separate company.

== Lines ==
- Yakuri Cable: A funicular line in Takamatsu, Kagawa.
- Unpenji Ropeway: An aerial lift in Kan'onji, Kagawa.
- Tairyūji Ropeway: An aerial lift between Naka and Anan, Tokushima.

== See also ==
- List of funicular railways
