= List of railway lines in Japan (R to Z) =

List of railway lines in Japan
#, A to I	J to P	R to Z

== R ==
- Rakutenchi Cable (Common name. Okamoto MFG)
- Rifu Line (Common name. East Japan Railway Company)
- Rikuu-Sai Line (East Japan Railway Company)
- Rikuu-Tō Line (East Japan Railway Company)
- Rinkai Fukutoshin Line (Former name. Tokyo Waterfront Area Rapid Transit)
- Rinkai Line (Tokyo Waterfront Area Rapid Transit)
- Rinkai Main Line (Freight. Keiyo Rinkai Railway)
- Rinkai Main Line (Freight. Sendai Rinkai Railway)
- Rinkan Sun Line (Nickname. Nankai Electric Railway)
- Rinkō Line (Freight. Taiheiyo Coal Services and Transportation)
- Rokkō Cable Line (Rokko Maya Railway)
- Rokkō Island Line (Kobe New Transit)
- Rumoi Main Line (Hokkaido Railway Company)
- Ryōmō Line (East Japan Railway Company)
- Ryūgasaki Line (Kanto Railway)

== S ==
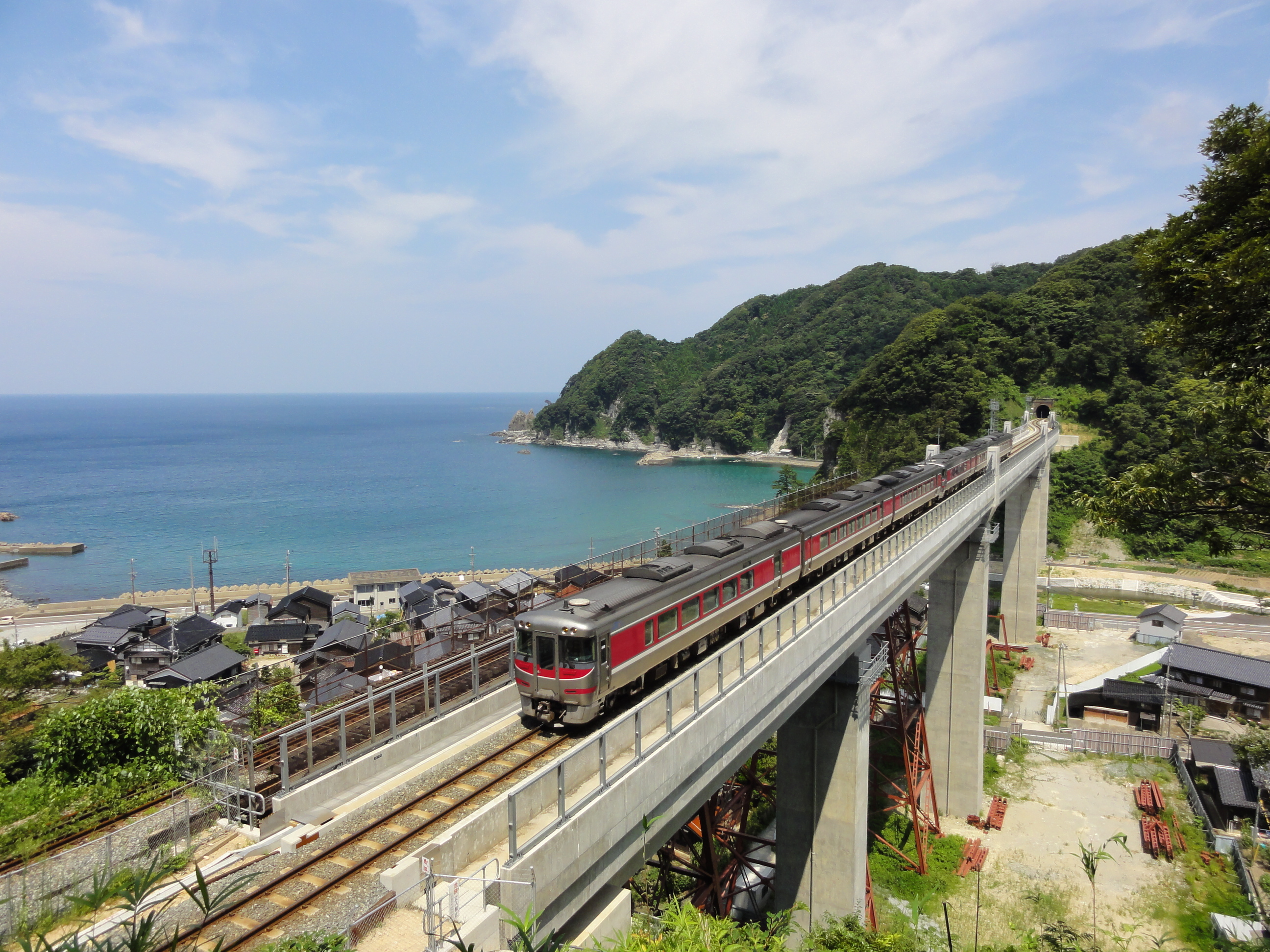
JR San'in Main Line

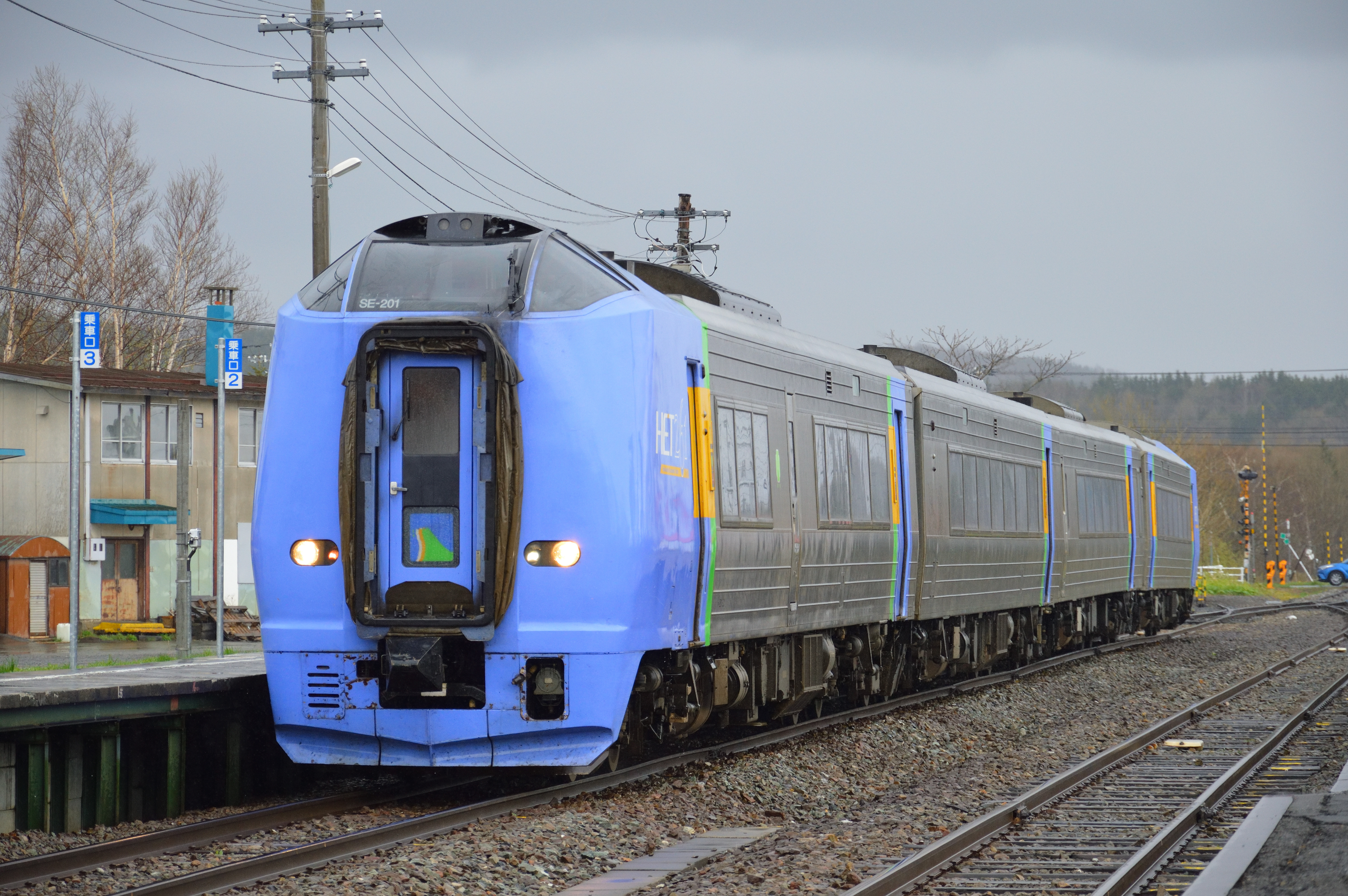
JR Sōya Main Line

- Sagami Line (East Japan Railway Company)
- Sagamihara Line (Keio Electric Railway)
- Sagano Line (Nickname. West Japan Railway Company)
- Sagano Scenic Line (Sagano Scenic Railway)
- Saikyō Line (Nickname. East Japan Railway Company)
- Sai-no-Kuni Stadium Line (Nickname. Saitama Railway)
- Saitama Rapid Railway Line (Saitama Railway)
- Saito Line (Nickname. Osaka Rapid Railway)
- Saitozaki Line (Common name. Kyushu Railway Company)
- Sakai Line (West Japan Railway Company)
- Sakaisuji Line (Osaka Municipal Transportation Bureau)
- Sakamoto Cable (Common name. Hieizan Railway)
- Sakuradōri Line (Common name. Transportation Bureau City of Nagoya)
- Sakurai Line (West Japan Railway Company)
- Sakurajima Line (West Japan Railway Company)
- Sakuramachi Line (Nagasaki Electric Tramway)
- Sambashi Line (Tosaden Kōtsū)
- Sanda Line (Kobe Electric Railway)
- Samatsu Line (Common name. East Japan Railway Company)
- Sangi Line (Sangi Railway)
- Sangū Line (Central Japan Railway Company)
- San'in Main Line (West Japan Railway Company)
- Sankō Line (West Japan Railway Company) (Closed on march 2018 )
- Sano Line (Tobu Railway)
- San'yō Main Line (West Japan Railway Company, Kyushu Railway Company)
- San'yō Shinkansen (West Japan Railway Company)
- Sasaguri Line (Kyushu Railway Company)
- Sasebo Line (Kyushu Railway Company)
- Sassho Line (Hokkaido Railway Company)
- Sawara Line (Common name. Hokkaido Railway Company)
- Sayama Line (Seibu Railway)
- Seaside Line (Nickname. Yokohama New Transit)
- Seibu Chichibu Line (Seibu Railway)
- Seibu Yūrakuchō Line (Seibu Railway)
- Seibuen Line (Seibu Railway)
- Seikan Tunnel Tappi Shakō Line (Seikan Tunnel Museum)
- Seikibashi Line (Okayama Electric Tramway)
- Seishin Extended Line (Kobe Municipal Transportation Bureau)
- Seishin Line (Kobe Municipal Transportation Bureau)
- Seishin-Yamate Line (Group name. Comprising the Seishin Line, Seishin Extended Line and Yamate Line. Kobe Municipal Transportation Bureau)
- Sekihoku Main Line (Hokkaido Railway Company)
- Sekishō Line (Hokkaido Railway Company)
- Semboku Line (Nankai Electric Railway)
- Semmō Main Line (Hokkaido Railway Company)
- Sendai Airport Access Line (Nickname. East Japan Railway Company. Sendai Airport Transit)
- Sendai Airport Line (Translation. Sendai Airport Transit)
- Sendai Futō Line (Freight. Sendai Rinkai Railway)
- Sendai Kūkō Line (Sendai Airport Transit)
- Sendai Nishikō Line (Freight. Sendai Rinkai Railway)
- Sennichimae Line (Osaka Municipal Transportation Bureau)
- Senri Line (Hankyu Corporation)
- Senseki Line (East Japan Railway Company)
- Senzaki Branch Line (Common name. West Japan Railway Company)
- Senzan Line (East Japan Railway Company)
- Setagaya Line (Tokyo Kyuko Electric Railway)
- Seto Line (Nagoya Railroad)
- Seto-Ōhashi Line (Nickname. West Japan Railway Company, Shikoku Railway Company)
- Setouchi Sazanami Line (Nickname. West Japan Railway Company)
- Shibayama Railway Line (Shibayama Railway)
- Shido Line (Takamatsu-Kotohira Electric Railroad)
- Shigaraki Line (Shigaraki Kōgen Railway)
- Shigi Line (Kintetsu Railway)
- Shima Line (Kintetsu Railway)
- Shimabara Railway Line (Shimabara Railway)
- Shimanto Green Line (Nickname. Shikoku Railway Company)
- Shimminato Line (Freight. Japan Freight Railway Company)
- Shimminatokō Line (Man'yo Line)
- Shinano Railway Line (Shinano Railway)
- Shin'etsu Main Line (East Japan Railway Company)
- Shinjuku Line (Seibu Railway)
- Shinjuku Line (Tokyo Metropolitan Bureau of Transportation)
- Shinonoi Line (East Japan Railway Company)
- Shiomibashi Line (Common name. Nankai Electric Railway)
- Shiomichō Line (Freight. Nagoya Rinkai Railway)
- Shizuoka Shimizu Line (Shizuoka Railway)
- Shōnan Monorail (Common name. Shonan Monorail)
- Shōnan-Shinjuku Line (Nickname. East Japan Railway Company)
- Shōwamachi Line (Freight. Nagoya Rinkai Railway)
- Skyrail Midorizaka Line (Nickname. Skyrail Service)
- Sōbu Line (Rapid) (Common name. East Japan Railway Company)
- Sōbu Main Line (East Japan Railway Company)
- Sōbu Nagareyama Line (Sobu Nagareyama Electric Railway)
- Sōtetsu Main Line (Sagami Railway)
- Sotobō Line (East Japan Railway Company)
- South Line (Translation. Freight. Akita Rinkai Railway)
- Sōya Main Line (Hokkaido Railway Company)
- Suigun Line (East Japan Railway Company)
- Suikū Line (Nickname. East Japan Railway Company)
- Suizenji Line (Kumamoto City Transportation Bureau)
- Sukumo Line (Tosa Kuroshio Railway)
- Sunzu Line (Izuhakone Railway)
- Suzuka Line (Kintetsu Railway)

== T ==
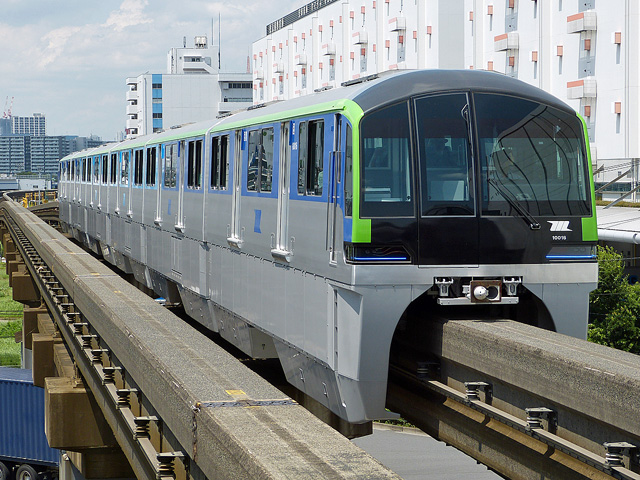
Tōkyō Monorail Haneda Line

- Tadami Line (East Japan Railway Company)
- Taga Line (Ohmi Railway)
- Tagawa Line (Heisei Chikuho Railway)
- Taiheiyō Coal Services and Transportation Rinkō Line (Taiheiyō Coal Services and Transportation)
- Taisha Line (Ichibata Electric Railway)
- Taita Line (Central Japan Railway Company)
- Takahama Line (Iyo Railway)
- Takamori Line (Minamiaso Railway)
- Takao Line (Keio Electric Railway)
- Takao Tozan Cable (Common name. Takao Tozan Electric Railway)
- Takaoka Tramway Line (Man'yo Line)
- JR Takarazuka Line (Nickname. West Japan Railway Company)
- Takarazuka Main Line (Hankyu Corporation)
- Takasaki Line (East Japan Railway Company)
- Takashinohama Line (Nankai Electric Railway)
- Takayama Main Line (Central Japan Railway Company, West Japan Railway Company)
- Takehana Line (Nagoya Railroad)
- Taketoyo Line (Central Japan Railway Company)
- Tama Line (Odakyu Electric Railway)
- Tamanoi Line (Common name. Nagoya Railroad)
- Tama Urban Monorail Line (Tama Urban Monorail)
- Tamagawa Line (Seibu Railway)
- Tōkyū Tamagawa Line (Tokyo Kyuko Electric Railway)
- Tamako Line (Seibu Railway)
- Tanagawa Line (Nankai Electric Railway)
- Tanimachi Line (Osaka Municipal Transportation Bureau)
- Taniyama Line (Kagoshima City Transportation Bureau)
- Tarumi Line (Tarumi Railway)
- Tasaki Line (Kumamoto City Transportation Bureau)
- Tateyama Cable Car (Common name. Tateyama Kurobe Kanko)
- Tateyama Line (Toyama Chiho Railway)
- Tateyama Tunnel Trolleybus (Common name. Tateyama Kurobe Kanko)
- Tatsuno Branch Line (Common name. East Japan Railway Company)
- Tawaramoto Line (Kintetsu Railway)
- Tazawako Line (East Japan Railway Company)
- Tenjin Ōmuta Line (Nishi-Nippon Railroad)
- Tenri Line (Kintetsu Railway)
- Tenryū Hamanako Line (Tenryu Hamanako Railroad)
- Toba Line (Kintetsu Railway)
- Tōbu Kyūryō Line (Aichi Rapid Transit)
- Tōchiku Line (Freight. Nagoya Rinkai Railway)
- Tōgane Line (East Japan Railway Company)
- Tōhō Line (Sapporo City Transportation Bureau)
- Tōhoku Main Line (East Japan Railway Company)
- Tōhoku Shinkansen (East Japan Railway Company)
- Tōjō Line (Tobu Railway)
- Tōkadai Line (Tokadai New Transit) Closed
- Tōkaidō Main Line (East Japan Railway Company, Central Japan Railway Company, West Japan Railway Company)
- Tōkaidō Shinkansen (Central Japan Railway Company)
- Tōkō Line (Freight. Nagoya Rinkai Railway)
- Tokoname Line (Nagoya Railroad)
- Tokushima Line (Shikoku Railway Company)
- Tōkyō Monorail Haneda Line (Tokyo Monorail)
- Tōkyō Waterfront New Transit Waterfront Line (Yurikamome)
- Tōkyū Tamagawa Line (Tokyo Kyuko Electric Railway)
- Toshima Line (Seibu Railway)
- Tōsō Line (Kagoshima City Transportation Bureau)
- Towada Hachimantai Shikisai Line (Nickname. East Japan Railway Company)
- Towada Kankō Electric Railway Line (Towada Kanko Electric Railway)
- Toyama City Tram Line (Group name. Comprising the tramway lines in Toyama city. Toyama Chiho Railway)
- Toyama Light Rail Line (Toyama Light Rail)
- Toyamakō Line (Toyama Light Rail)
- Tōyō Rapid Line (Toyo Rapid Railway)
- Toyokawa Line (Nagoya Railroad)
- Tōyoko Line (Tokyo Kyuko Electric Railway)
- Toyota Line (Nagoya Railroad)
- Tōzai Line (Kobe Rapid Railway (services) )
- Tōzai Line (Kyoto Municipal Transportation Bureau)
- Tōzai Line (Sapporo City Transportation Bureau)
- Tōzai Line (Sendai City Transportation Bureau) Under construction
- Tōzai Line (Tokyo Metro)
- JR Tōzai Line (West Japan Railway Company)
- Trolleybus Line (Tateyama Kurobe Kanko)
- Trunk Line (Kumamoto City Transportation Bureau)
- Tsugaru-Kaikyō Line (Nickname. East Japan Railway Company, Hokkaido Railway Company)
- Tsugaru Line (East Japan Railway Company)
- Tsugaru Railway Line (Tsugaru Railway)
- Tsukuba Express Line (Metropolitan Intercity Railway Company)
- Tsurumai Line (Common name. Transportation Bureau City of Nagoya)
- Tsurumi Line (East Japan Railway Company)
- Tsushima Line (Nagoya Railroad)
- Tsuyama Line (West Japan Railway Company)

== U ==
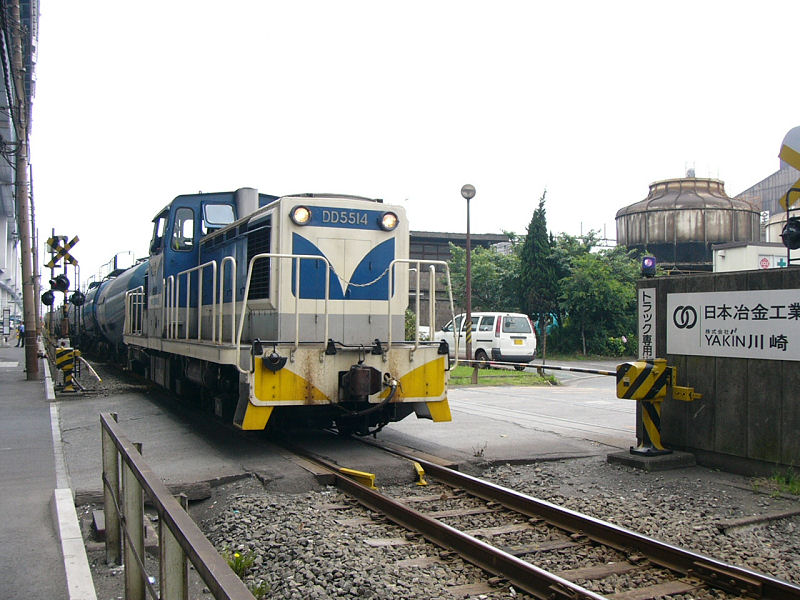
Kanagawa Rinkai Railway Ukishima Line

- Ube Line (West Japan Railway Company)
- Uchibō Line (East Japan Railway Company)
- Uchiko Line (Shikoku Railway Company)
- Uemachi Line (Hankai Electric Tramway)
- Ueno Monorail (Tokyo Metropolitan Bureau of Transportation)
- Uetsu Main Line (East Japan Railway Company)
- Uji Line (Keihan Electric Railway)
- Ujina Line (Hiroshima Electric Railway)
- Ukishima Line (Freight. Kanagawa Rinkai Railway)
- Umeda Freight Line (Common name. West Japan Railway Company)
- Umi Line (Common name. Kyushu Railway Company)
- Umineko Rail Hachinohe City Line (Nickname. East Japan Railway Company)
- Umi-no-Nakamichi Line (Nickname. Kyushu Railway Company)
- Umi-Shibaura Branch Line (Common name. East Japan Railway Company)
- Uno Line (West Japan Railway Company)
- Utsube Line (Kintetsu Railway)
- Utsunomiya Line (Tobu Railway)
- Utsunomiya Line (Nickname. East Japan Railway Company)
- Utsunomiya Light Rail

== W ==
- Wadamisaki Line (Common name. West Japan Railway Company)
- Wajima Line (Common name. Noto Railway)
- Wakamatsu Line (Nickname. Kyushu Railway Company)
- Wakasa Line (Wakasa Railway)
- Wakayama Line (West Japan Railway Company)
- Wakayamakō Line (Nankai Electric Railway)
- Watarase Keikoku Line (Watarase Keikoku Railway)

== Y ==
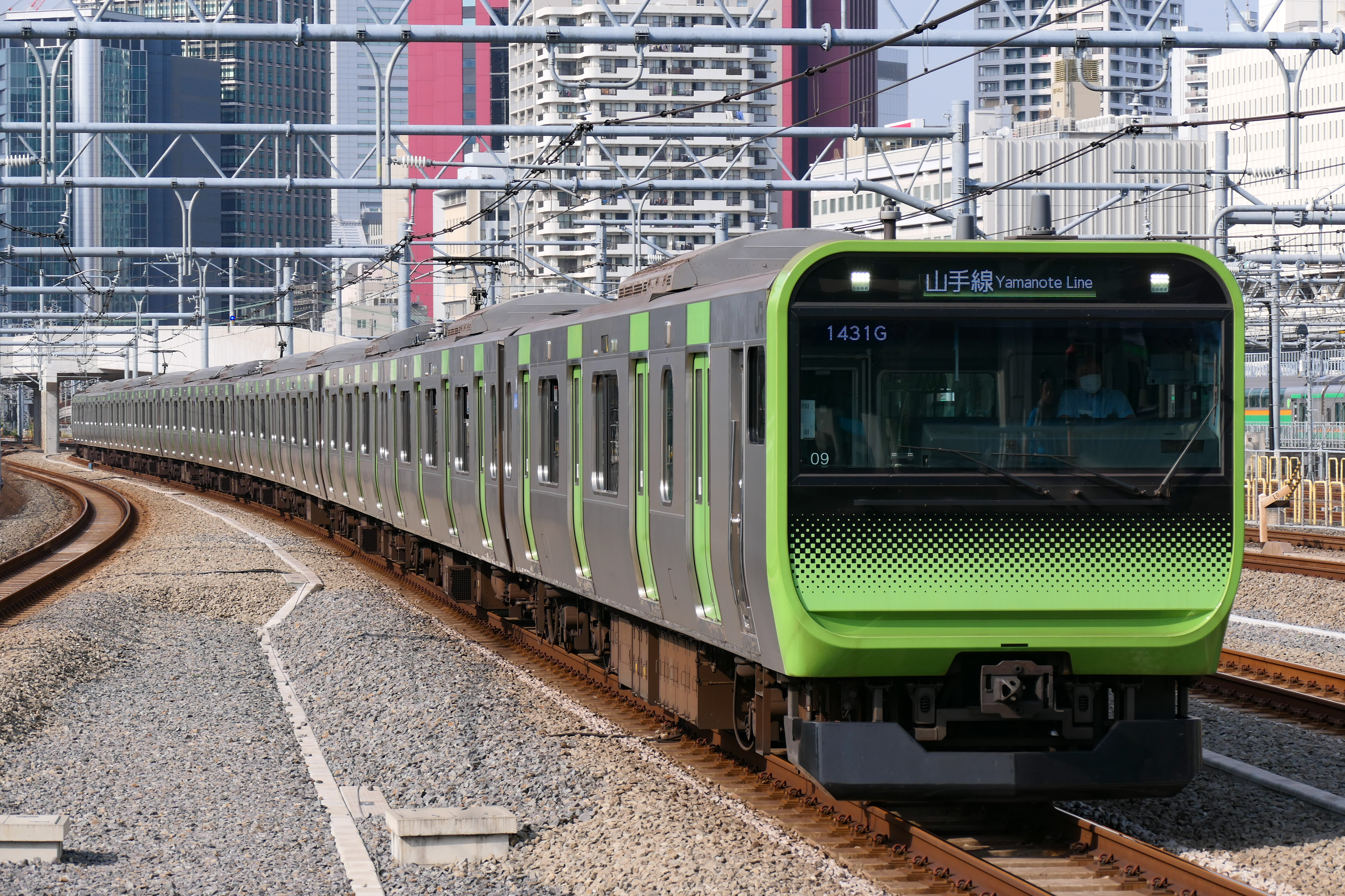
JR Yamanote Line

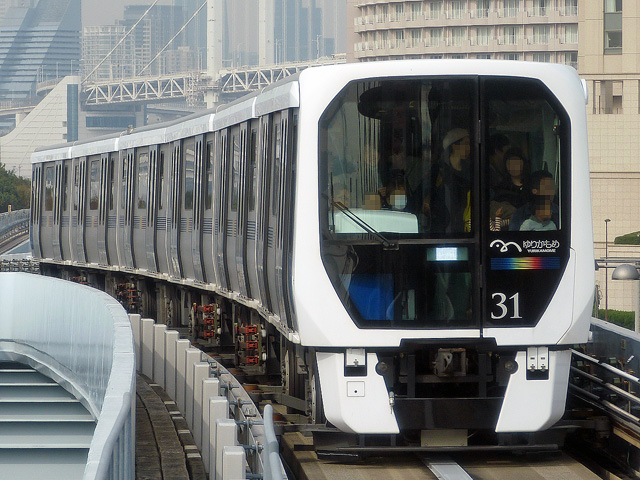
Yurikamome

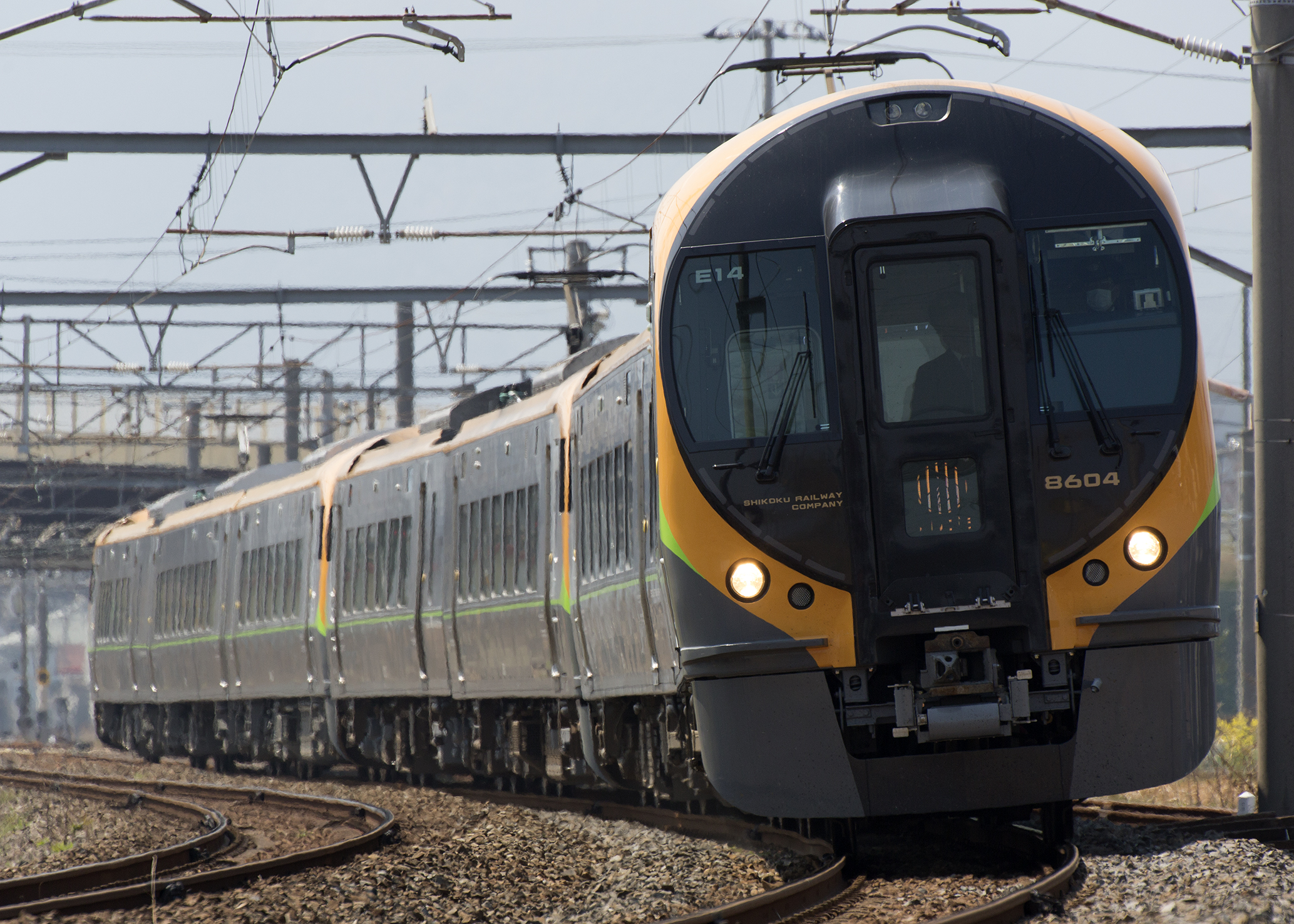
JR Yosan Line

- Yahiko Line (East Japan Railway Company)
- Yakuri Cable (Common name. Shikoku Cable)
- Yamada Line (East Japan Railway Company)
- Yamada Line (Kintetsu Railway)
- Yamagata Line (Nickname. East Japan Railway Company)
- Yamagata Shinkansen (Nickname. East Japan Railway Company)
- Yamaguchi Line (Seibu Railway)
- Yamaguchi Line (West Japan Railway Company)
- Yamanote Line (East Japan Railway Company)
- Yamate Line (Kobe Municipal Transportation Bureau)
- Yamatoji Line (Nickname. West Japan Railway Company)
- Yashiro Line (Nagano Electric Railway)
- Yasunoya Line (Toyama Chiho Railway)
- Yatsugatake Kōgen Line (Nickname. East Japan Railway Company)
- Yodo Line (Shikoku Railway Company)
- Yōkaichi Line (Ohmi Railway)
- Yokogawa Line (Hiroshima Electric Railway)
- Yokogawara Line (Iyo Railway)
- Yokohama Line (East Japan Railway Company)
- Yokosuka Line (East Japan Railway Company)
- Yonesaka Line (East Japan Railway Company)
- Yōrō Line (Yōrō Railway)
- Yosan Line (Shikoku Railway Company)
- Yoshino Line (Kintetsu Railway)
- Yoshinogawa Blue Line (Nickname. Shikoku Railway Company)
- Yotsubashi Line (Osaka Municipal Transportation Bureau)
- Yufu Kōgen Line (Nickname. Kyushu Railway Company)
- Yui-Rail (Nickname. Okinawa Urban Monorail)
- Yūkarigaoka Line (Yamaman)
- Yumekamome (Nickname. Kobe Municipal Transportation Bureau)
- JR Yumesaki Line (Nickname. West Japan Railway Company)
- Yunokawa Line (Hakodate City Transportation Bureau)
- Yunomae Line (Kumagawa Railroad)
- Yunoyama Line (Kintetsu Railway)
- Seibu Yūrakuchō Line (Seibu Railway)
- Yūrakuchō Line (Tokyo Metro)
- Yūrakuchō New Line (Tokyo Metro)
- Yurikamome (Nickname. Yurikamome)
- Yutorīto Line (Nickname. Nagoya Guideway Bus)

== Z ==
- Keikyu Zushi Line (Keihin Electric Express Railway)
