= List of railway companies in Japan =

List of railway companies in Japan lists current Japanese railway operators. Those in italics are third-sector railways, owned or operated both by public and private entities.

== Japan Railways Group ==
The Japan Railways Group consists of the seven companies that were formed after the privatization of the Japanese National Railways.

=== Passenger ===
- Hokkaido Railway Company 北海道旅客鉄道 (JR Hokkaido JR北海道)
- East Japan Railway Company 東日本旅客鉄道 (JR East JR東日本)
- Central Japan Railway Company 東海旅客鉄道 (JR Central JR東海)
- West Japan Railway Company 西日本旅客鉄道 (JR West JR西日本)
- Shikoku Railway Company 四国旅客鉄道 (JR Shikoku JR四国)
- Kyushu Railway Company 九州旅客鉄道 (JR Kyushu JR九州)

=== Freight ===
- Japan Freight Railway Company 日本貨物鉄道 (JR Freight JR貨物)

== Major private railways ==
=== Kantō region ===
- Keikyu 京浜急行電鉄 (京急)
- Keio Corporation 京王電鉄
- Keisei Electric Railway 京成電鉄
- Odakyu Electric Railway 小田急電鉄
- Sagami Railway 相模鉄道 (Sotetsu 相鉄)
- Seibu Railway 西武鉄道
- Tobu Railway 東武鉄道
- Tokyo Metro 東京地下鉄 (東京メトロ)
- Tokyu Railways 東急電鉄

=== Chūbu region ===
- Nagoya Railroad 名古屋鉄道 (Meitetsu 名鉄)

=== Kansai region ===
- Hankyu Corporation 阪急電鉄
- Hanshin Electric Railway 阪神電気鉄道
- Keihan Electric Railway 京阪電気鉄道
- Kintetsu Railway 近畿日本鉄道 (近鉄)
- Nankai Electric Railway 南海電気鉄道

=== Kyushu ===
- Nishi-Nippon Railroad 西日本鉄道 (西鉄 Nishitetsu)

== Semi-major private railways ==
=== Kansai region ===
- Kita-Osaka Kyuko Railway 北大阪急行電鉄 (Kitakyū 北急)
- Kōbe Rapid Transit Railway 神戸高速鉄道 (subway, Category-3 railway operator)
- Sanyo Electric Railway 山陽電気鉄道

There were originally six semi-major private railways, but Nankai Electric Railway was reclassified as a major private railway at an unknown date bringing the list to five companies. On April 1, 2025, the list further reduced to three companies with the following company mergers: Shin-Keisei Electric Railway merged with parent company Keisei Electric Railway, and Semboku Rapid Railway merged with parent company Nankai Electric Railway.

== Other private and third-sector railways ==
From north to south by prefecture where railway operations are headquartered. Category-3 railway operators and subsidiary companies are not listed. Some English names are unofficial.

=== Hokkaido ===
- South Hokkaido Railway Company 道南いさりび鉄道株式会社

=== Tōhoku region ===
Aomori Prefecture

- Aoimori Railway 青い森鉄道
- Kōnan Railway 弘南鉄道
- Tsugaru Railway 津軽鉄道 (Tsutetsu 津鉄)

Iwate Prefecture

- IGR Iwate Galaxy Railway IGRいわて銀河鉄道
- Sanriku Railway 三陸鉄道 (Santetsu 三鉄)

Miyagi Prefecture

- Sendai Airport Transit 仙台空港鉄道

Akita Prefecture

- Akita Nairiku Jukan Tetsudo 秋田内陸縦貫鉄道
- Yuri Kōgen Railway 由利高原鉄道

Yamagata Prefecture

- Yamagata Railway 山形鉄道

Fukushima Prefecture

- Abukuma Kyuko 阿武隈急行 (Abukyū 阿武急)
- Aizu Railway 会津鉄道
- Fukushima Transportation 福島交通

=== Kantō region ===
Ibaraki Prefecture

- Hitachinaka Seaside Railway ひたちなか海浜鉄道
- Kantō Railway 関東鉄道 (Kantetsu 関鉄)
- Kashima Rinkai Railway 鹿島臨海鉄道

Tochigi Prefecture

- Mooka Railway 真岡鐵道
- Yagan Railway 野岩鉄道

Gunma Prefecture

- Jōmō Electric Railway 上毛電気鉄道
- Jōshin Dentetsu 上信電鉄
- Watarase Keikoku Railway わたらせ渓谷鐵道

Saitama Prefecture

- Chichibu Railway 秩父鉄道
- Saitama Railway 埼玉高速鉄道 (SR)

Chiba Prefecture

- Chōshi Electric Railway 銚子電気鉄道 (Chōden 銚電)
- Hokusō Railway 北総鉄道
- Isumi Railway いすみ鉄道
- Kominato Railway 小湊鉄道
- Ryūtetsu 流鉄
- Shibayama Railway 芝山鉄道
- Tōyō Rapid Railway 東葉高速鉄道

Tokyo

- Metropolitan Intercity Railway Company (Tsukuba Express) 首都圏新都市鉄道 (つくばエクスプレス)
- Tōkyō Waterfront Area Rapid Transit (Rinkai Line) 東京臨海高速鉄道 (りんかい線) (TWR)

Kanagawa Prefecture

- Odakyu Hakone (株式会社小田急箱根)
- Izuhakone Railway (Daiyūzan Line) 伊豆箱根鉄道 (大雄山線)
- Yokohama Minatomirai Railway 横浜高速鉄道

=== Chūbu region ===
Niigata Prefecture

- Echigo TOKImeki Railway えちごトキめき鉄道 (ETR)
- Hokuetsu Express 北越急行

Toyama Prefecture

- Ainokaze Toyama Railway あいの風とやま鉄道
- Kurobe Gorge Railway 黒部峡谷鉄道
- Toyama Chihō Railway 富山地方鉄道 (Chitetsu 地鉄)

Ishikawa Prefecture

- Hokuriku Railroad 北陸鉄道 (Hokutetsu 北鉄)
- IR Ishikawa Railway IRいしかわ鉄道
- Noto Railway のと鉄道

Fukui Prefecture

- Echizen Railway えちぜん鉄道
- Hapi-Line Fukui ハピラインふくい

Yamanashi Prefecture

- Fuji Kyūkō 富士急行 (Fujikyū, Fuji-Q 富士急)

Nagano Prefecture

- Alpico Kōtsū アルピコ交通
- Nagano Electric Railway 長野電気鉄道 (Nagaden 長電)
- Shinano Railway しなの鉄道
- Uedadentetsu 上田電鉄 (Ueden 上電)

Gifu Prefecture

- Akechi Railway 明知鉄道 (Aketetsu 明鉄)
- Nagaragawa Railway 長良川鉄道 (Nagatetsu 長鉄)
- Tarumi Railway 樽見鉄道
- Yōrō Railway 養老鉄道

Shizuoka Prefecture

- Enshū Railway 遠州鉄道 (Entetsu 遠鉄)
- Gakunan Electric Train 岳南電車
- Izuhakone Railway (Sunzu Line) 伊豆箱根鉄道 (駿豆線)
- Izukyū Corporation 伊豆急行 (伊豆急)
- Ōigawa Railway 大井川鐵道 (Daitetsu 大鐵)
- Shizuoka Railway 静岡鉄道 (Shizutetsu 静鉄)
- Tenryū Hamanako Railroad 天竜浜名湖鉄道 (Tenhama 天浜)

Aichi Prefecture

- Aichi Loop Railway 愛知環状鉄道 (Aikan 愛環)
- JR-Central Transport Service Company JR東海交通事業 (TKJ)
- Nagoya Seaside Rapid Railway (Aonami Line) 名古屋臨海高速鉄道 (あおなみ線)
- Toyohashi Railroad 豊橋鉄道 (Toyotetsu 豊鉄)

=== Kansai region ===
Mie Prefecture

- Iga Railway 伊賀鉄道
- Ise Railway 伊勢鉄道 (Isetetsu 伊勢鉄)
- Sangi Railway 三岐鉄道
- Yokkaichi Asonarou Railway 四日市あすなろう鉄道

Shiga Prefecture

- Ohmi Railway 近江鉄道
- Shigaraki Kohgen Railway 信楽高原鐵道

Kyoto Prefecture

- Eizan Electric Railway 叡山電鉄 (Eiden 叡電)
- Sagano Scenic Railway 嵯峨野観光鉄道
- WILLER TRAINS (Kyoto Tango Railway 京都丹後鉄道)

Osaka Prefecture

- Mizuma Railway 水間鉄道 (Suitetsu 水鉄)

Hyōgo Prefecture

- Hōjō Railway 北条鉄道
- Kobe Electric Railway 神戸電気鉄道 (Shintetsu 神鉄)
- Nose Electric Railway 能勢電気鉄道 (Noseden 能勢電)

Wakayama Prefecture

- Kishū Railway 紀州鉄道
- Wakayama Electric Railway 和歌山電鐵

=== Chūgoku region ===
Tottori Prefecture

- Chizu Express 智頭急行
- Wakasa Railway 若桜鉄道

Shimane Prefecture

- Ichibata Electric Railway 一畑電車 (Bataden ばたでん)

Okayama Prefecture

- Ibara Railway 井原鉄道
- Mizushima Rinkai Railway 水島臨海鉄道

Yamaguchi Prefecture

- Nishikigawa Railway 錦川鉄道

=== Shikoku ===
Tokushima Prefecture

- Asa Kaigan Railway 阿佐海岸鉄道 (Asatetsu 阿佐鉄)

Kagawa Prefecture

- Takamatsu-Kotohira Electric Railroad 高松琴平電気鉄道 (Kotoden 琴電)

Ehime Prefecture

- Iyo Railway 伊予鉄道 (Iyotetsu 伊予鉄)

Kōchi Prefecture

- Tosa Kuroshio Railway 土佐くろしお鉄道

=== Kyushu ===
Fukuoka Prefecture

- Amagi Railway 甘木鉄道 (Amatetsu 甘鉄)
- Chikuhō Electric Railroad 筑豊電気鉄道 (Chikutetsu 筑鉄) – legally classified as a railway despite using tram vehicles
- Heisei Chikuhō Railway 平成筑豊鉄道 (Heichiku 平筑)

Nagasaki Prefecture

- Matsuura Railway 松浦鉄道 (MR)
- Shimabara Railway 島原鉄道 (Shimatetsu 島鉄)

Kumamoto Prefecture

- Hisatsu Orange Railway 肥薩おれんじ鉄道
- Kumagawa Railroad くま川鉄道 (Kumatetsu くま鉄)
- Kumamoto Electric Railway 熊本電気鉄道 (Kumaden 熊電, Kikuchi Electric Railway 菊池電車)
- Minamiaso Railway 南阿蘇鉄道

== Subways ==
- Sapporo City Transportation Bureau (Sapporo Subway) 札幌市交通局 (札幌市営地下鉄)
- Sendai City Transportation Bureau (Sendai Subway) 仙台市交通局 (仙台市営地下鉄)
- Saitama Railway 埼玉高速鉄道 (SR)
- Tokyo Metropolitan Bureau of Transportation (Toei Subway) 東京都交通局 (都営地下鉄)
- Tokyo Waterfront Area Rapid Transit (Rinkai Line) 東京臨海高速鉄道 (りんかい線) (TWR)
- Yokohama City Transportation Bureau (Yokohama Municipal Subway) 横浜市交通局 (横浜市営地下鉄)
- Yokohama Minatomirai Railway (Minatomirai Line) 横浜高速鉄道 (みなとみらい線)
- Nagoya City Transportation Bureau (Nagoya Municipal Subway) 名古屋市交通局 (名古屋市営地下鉄)
- Kyoto Municipal Transportation Bureau (Kyoto Municipal Subway) 京都市交通局 (京都市営地下鉄)
- Osaka Metro Co., Ltd. (Osaka Metro) 大阪高速電気軌道 (Osaka Metro (大阪メトロ))
- Kobe Municipal Transportation Bureau (Kobe Municipal Subway) 神戸市交通局 (神戸市営地下鉄)
- Fukuoka City Transportation Bureau (Fukuoka City Subway) 福岡市交通局 (福岡市地下鉄)

== Monorails ==
- Chiba Urban Monorail 千葉都市モノレール
- Maihama Resort Line (Disney Resort Line) 舞浜リゾートライン (ディズニーリゾートライン)
- Tokyo Monorail 東京モノレール
- Tokyo Tama Intercity Monorail 多摩都市モノレール
- Shonan Monorail 湘南モノレール
- Osaka Monorail 大阪モノレール
- Kitakyushu Monorail 北九州高速鉄道 (北九州モノレール)
- Okinawa Urban Monorail (Yui Rail) 沖縄都市モノレール (ゆいレール)

== New transit systems ==
- Aichi Rapid Transit (Linimo) 愛知高速交通 (リニモ)
- Hiroshima Rapid Transit (Astram Line) 広島高速交通 (アストラムライン)
- Kobe New Transit (Port Liner, Rokkō Liner) 神戸新交通 (ポートライナー, 六甲ライナー)
- Nagoya Guideway Bus (Yutorīto Line) 名古屋ガイドウェイバス (ゆとりーとライン) – elevated section legally classified as a railway
- Osaka Municipal Transportation Bureau (New Tram) 大阪市交通局 (ニュートラム)
- Saitama New Urban Transit (New Shuttle) 埼玉新都市交通 (ニューシャトル)
- Seibu Railway (Yamaguchi Line) 西武鉄道 (山口線)
- Yamaman Co., Ltd. (Yūkarigaoka Line) 山万 (ユーカリが丘線)
- Yokohama Seaside Line (Kanazawa Seaside Line) 横浜シーサイドライン (金沢シーサイドライン)
- Yurikamome ゆりかもめ

== Trams and light rail ==
- Enoshima Electric Railway 江ノ島電鉄 (Enoden 江ノ電)
- Fukui Railway 福井鉄道 (Fukutetsu 福鉄)
- Hakodate City Transportation Bureau 函館市交通局
- Hankai Electric Tramway 阪堺電気軌道
- Hiroshima Electric Railway 広島電鉄 (Hiroden 広電)
- Iyo Railway (Matsuyama City Line) 伊予鉄道 (松山市内線) (Iyotetsu 伊予鉄)
- Kagoshima City Transportation Bureau 鹿児島市交通局
- Keifuku Electric Railroad 京福電気鉄道 (Randen 嵐電)
- Keihan Electric Railway (Ōtsu Line) 京阪電気鉄道 (大津線)
- Kumamoto City Transportation Bureau 熊本市交通局
- Manyosen 万葉線
- Nagasaki Electric Tramway 長崎電気軌道
- Okayama Electric Tramway 岡山電気軌道 (Okaden 岡電)
- Sapporo City Transportation Bureau (Sapporo Streetcar) 札幌市交通局 (札幌市電)
- Tōkyō Metropolitan Government Bureau of Transportation (Toden) 東京都交通局 (都電)
- Tokyu Corporation (Setagaya Line) 東京急行電鉄 (世田谷線) (東急)
- Tosaden Traffic とさでん交通 (Tosaden 土佐電)
- Toyama Chihō Railway (Toyama City Tram Line) 富山地方鉄道 (富山市内軌道線) (Chitetsu 地鉄)
- Toyohashi Railroad (Azumada Main Line) 豊橋鉄道 (東田本線) (Toyotetsu 豊鉄)
- Utsunomiya Light Rail 宇都宮ライトレール

== Funiculars ==
- Hakone Tozan Railway (Hakone Tozan Cable Car) 箱根登山鉄道 (箱根登山ケーブルカー)
- Hieizan Railway (Sakamoto Cable) 比叡山鉄道 (坂本ケーブル)
- Izuhakone Railway (Jukkokutōge Cable Car) 伊豆箱根鉄道 (十国峠ケーブルカー)
- Keifuku Electric Railroad (Eizan Cable) 京福電気鉄道 (叡山ケーブル) (Randen 嵐電)
- Keihan Electric Railway (Otokoyama Cable) 京阪電気鉄道 (男山ケーブル)
- Kintetsu Railway (Ikoma Cable, Nishi-Shigi Cable) 近畿日本鉄道 (生駒ケーブル, 西信貴ケーブル) (近鉄)
- Kobe City Urban Development (Maya Cablecar) 神戸市都市整備公社 (摩耶ケーブル線, まやビューライン夢散歩)
- Kuramadera (Kurama-dera Cable) 鞍馬寺 (鞍馬寺ケーブル)
- Mitake Tozan Railway (Mitake Tozan Cable) 御岳登山鉄道 (御岳登山ケーブル)
- Mt. Rokkō Cable Car & Tourism Company (Rokkō Cable) 六甲山観光 (六甲ケーブル)
- Nankai Electric Railway (Kōyasan Cable) 南海電気鉄道 (高野山ケーブル)
- Nose Electric Railway (Myoken Cable) 能勢電鉄 (妙見ケーブル) (Noseden 能勢電)
- Okamoto MFG (Beppu Rakutenchi Cable) 岡本製作所 (別府ラクテンチケーブル)
- Ōyama Cable Car (Ōyama Cable Car) 大山観光電鉄 (大山ケーブルカー)
- Sarakurayama Tozan Railway (Sarakurayama Cable Car) 皿倉山登山鉄道 (皿倉山ケーブルカー)
- Seikan Tunnel Museum (Seikan Tunnel Tappi Shakō Line) 青函トンネル記念館 (青函トンネル竜飛斜坑線)
- Shikoku Cable (Yakuri Cable) 四国ケーブル (八栗ケーブル)
- Takao Tozan Electric Railway (Takao Tozan Cable) 高尾登山電鉄 (高尾登山ケーブル)
- Tango Kairiku Kōtsū (Amanohashidate Cable Car) 丹後海陸交通 (天橋立ケーブルカー) (Tankai 丹海)
- Tateyama Kurobe Kankō 立山黒部貫光 (TKK)
- Tsukuba Kankō Railway (Mount Tsukuba Cable Car) 筑波観光鉄道 (筑波山ケーブルカー)

== Freight-only companies ==
- Akita Rinkai Railway 秋田臨海鉄道
- Fukushima Rinkai Railway 福島臨海鉄道
- Hachinohe Rinkai Railway 八戸臨海鉄道
- Iwate Development Railway 岩手開発鉄道
- Kanagawa Rinkai Railway 神奈川臨海鉄道 (Kanarin 神奈臨)
- Keiyō Rinkai Railway 京葉臨海鉄道 (Rintetsu 臨鉄)
- Kinuura Rinkai Railway 衣浦臨海鉄道
- Nagoya Rinkai Railway 名古屋臨海鉄道
- Seinō Railway 西濃鉄道
- Sendai Rinkai Railway 仙台臨海鉄道
- Taiheiyō Coal Services and Transportation 太平洋石炭販売輸送

== Selected discontinued companies ==
Those with English articles are listed here.

- Chūgen Railway 中原鉄道
- Hokushin Kyuko Electric Railway 北神急行電鉄 – Transferred to Kobe Municipal Subway in 2020.
- Horonai Railway 官営幌内鉄道
- Japanese Government Railways 鉄道省
- Kaetsunō Railway 加越能鉄道
- Kashima Railway 鹿島鉄道
- Kosaka Smelting & Refining 小坂製錬 – Freight-only at the time of closure.
- Kurihara Den'en Railway くりはら田園鉄道
- Miki Rail-Bus 三木鉄道
- San'yō Railway 山陽鉄道
- Semboku Rapid Railway 泉北高速鉄道 – Merged with parent company Nankai Electric Railway on April 1, 2025.
- Shin-Keisei Electric Railway 新京成電鉄 – Merged with parent company Keisei Electric Railway on April 1, 2025. Its only line, the Shin-Keisei Line, was renamed to the Matsudo Line.
- Skyrail Service スカイレールサービス – Sometimes classified as a monorail or people mover. Ceased operating at noon on April 30, 2024.
- Tateyama Kurobe Kankō (Tateyama Tunnel Trolleybus) 立山黒部貫光 (立山トンネルトロリーバス) – Formerly Japan's last remaining trolleybus. Converted to electric buses in 2024.
- Tōkadai New Transit (Peachliner) 桃花台新交通 (ピーチライナー) – New transit system/people mover.
- Tokyo Metropolitan Bureau of Transportation (Ueno Zoo Monorail) 東京都交通局 (上野モノレール) – Service was suspended on October 31, 2019, and decommissioned on December 27, 2023.
- Towada Kankō Electric Railway 十和田観光電鉄 (Tōtetsu 十鉄)

== See also ==
- List of urban rail systems in Japan
- List of railway companies
- List of railway lines in Japan
- List of railway stations in Japan
- List of railway electrification systems in Japan
- Rail transport in Japan
- Monorails in Japan
- List of aerial lifts in Japan
- List of airport people mover systems
- List of bus operating companies in Japan
- List of defunct railway companies in Japan
