= Toyama City Tram Line =

Tram line

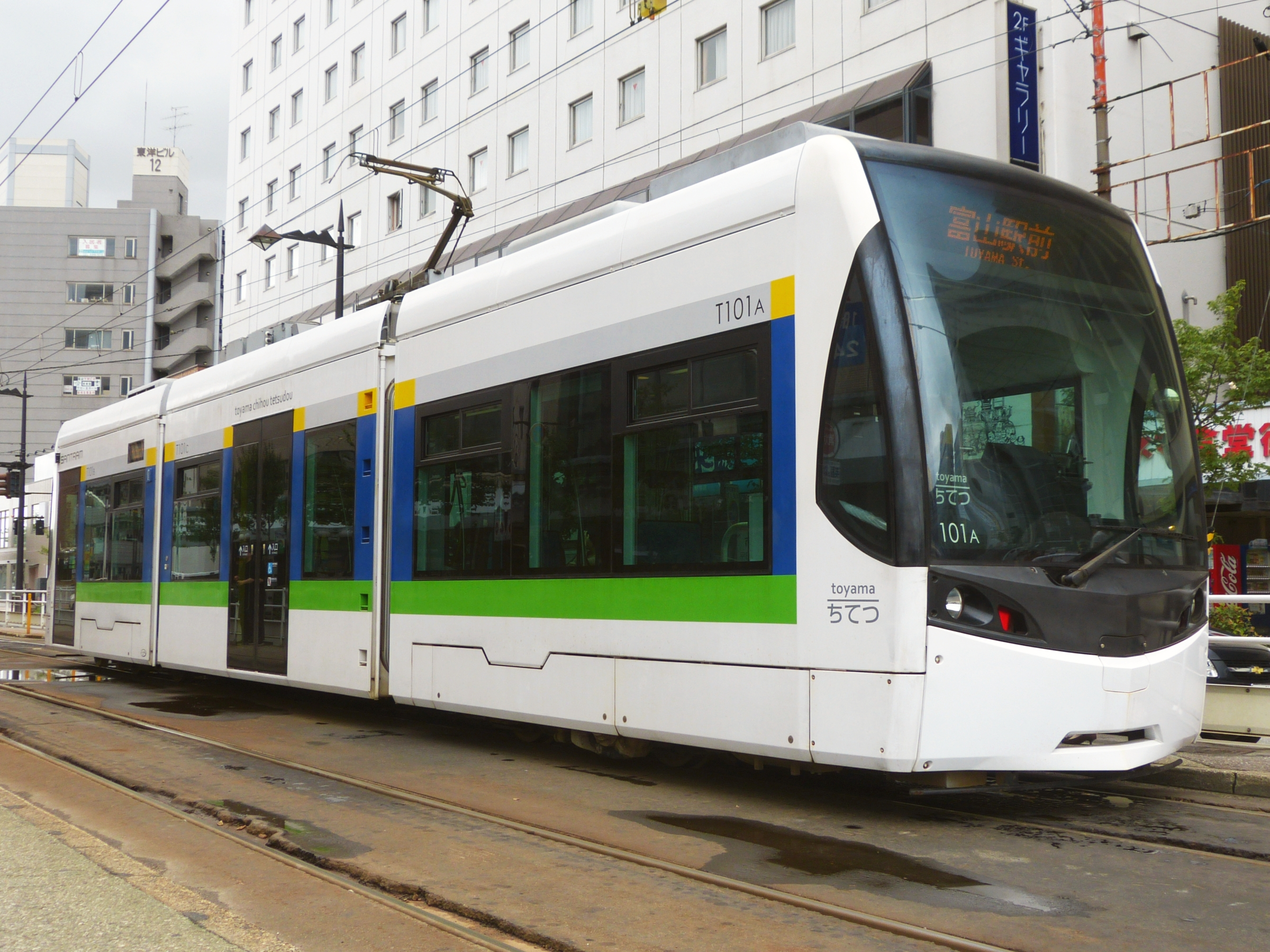
Circular line tram (SunTram model 9000)

Map of Toyama tram lines in 2020

The Toyama City Tram Line (富山市内軌道線, Toyama Shinai Kidōsen) of Toyama Chihō Railway, commonly referred to as shiden (市電), is a narrow gauge tram system in Toyama City, Toyama Prefecture, Japan. Its first operation was in 1912. It has 23 stations and runs 7.3 km.

While the system officially consists of five lines, operations are organized into six routes:

- Route 1: Minami-Toyama Ekimae – Nishichō – Toyama-eki
- Route 2: Minami-Toyama Ekimae – Toyama Daigakumae (University of Toyama)
- Route 3: Loop Line (Toyama-eki → Marunouchi → Gland Plaza-mae → Sakurabashi → Toyama-eki)
- Route 4: Iwasehama – Minami-Toyama Ekimae
- Route 5: Iwasehama – Toyama Daigakumae
- Route 6: Iwasehama – Loop Line

Since 2010, the tram has accepted ecomyca and passca smart cards for fare payment. Fares can also be paid with Nationwide Mutual Usage Service IC cards (such as ICOCA) or cash for ¥20 more per ride.

Since March 21, 2020, with the completion of a north south tram link across Toyama railway station, Toyama City Tram services through operate with the Toyama Chihō Railway Toyamakō Line, also known as the "Portram".
