= Kasadera Station =

Railway station in Nagoya, Japan

CA64 Kasadera Station 笠寺駅
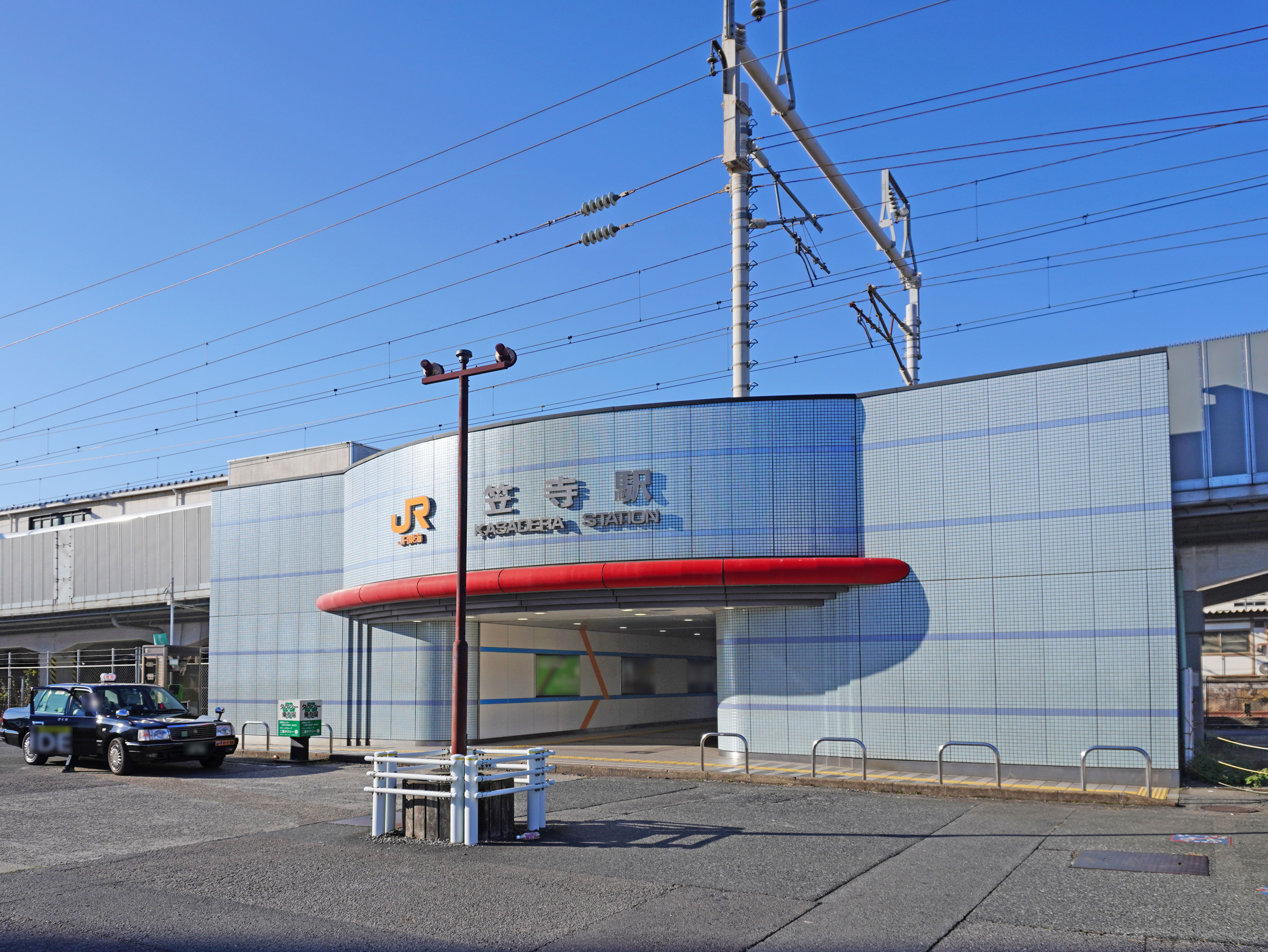
- Kasadera Station east exit in November 2022

General information
- Location: 2-1 Tatewakichō, Minami-ku, Nagoya-shi, Aichi-ken 457-0077; Japan
- Coordinates: 35.0949°N 136.9264°E
- Operator: JR Central; JR Freight; Nagoya Rinkai Railway
- Lines: Tōkaidō Main Line; Tōkō Line
- Distance: 356.8 kilometers from Tokyo
- Platforms: 1 island + 2 side platforms

Other information
- Status: Staffed
- Station code: CA63
- Website: Official website

History
- Opened: 10 April 1942

Passengers
- 2023–2024: 15,233 daily

Services
Preceding station	JR Central	Following station
Atsuta towards Maibara	Tōkaidō Main Line Local	Ōdaka towards Atami
Location
- Location within Aichi Prefecture Location within Japan

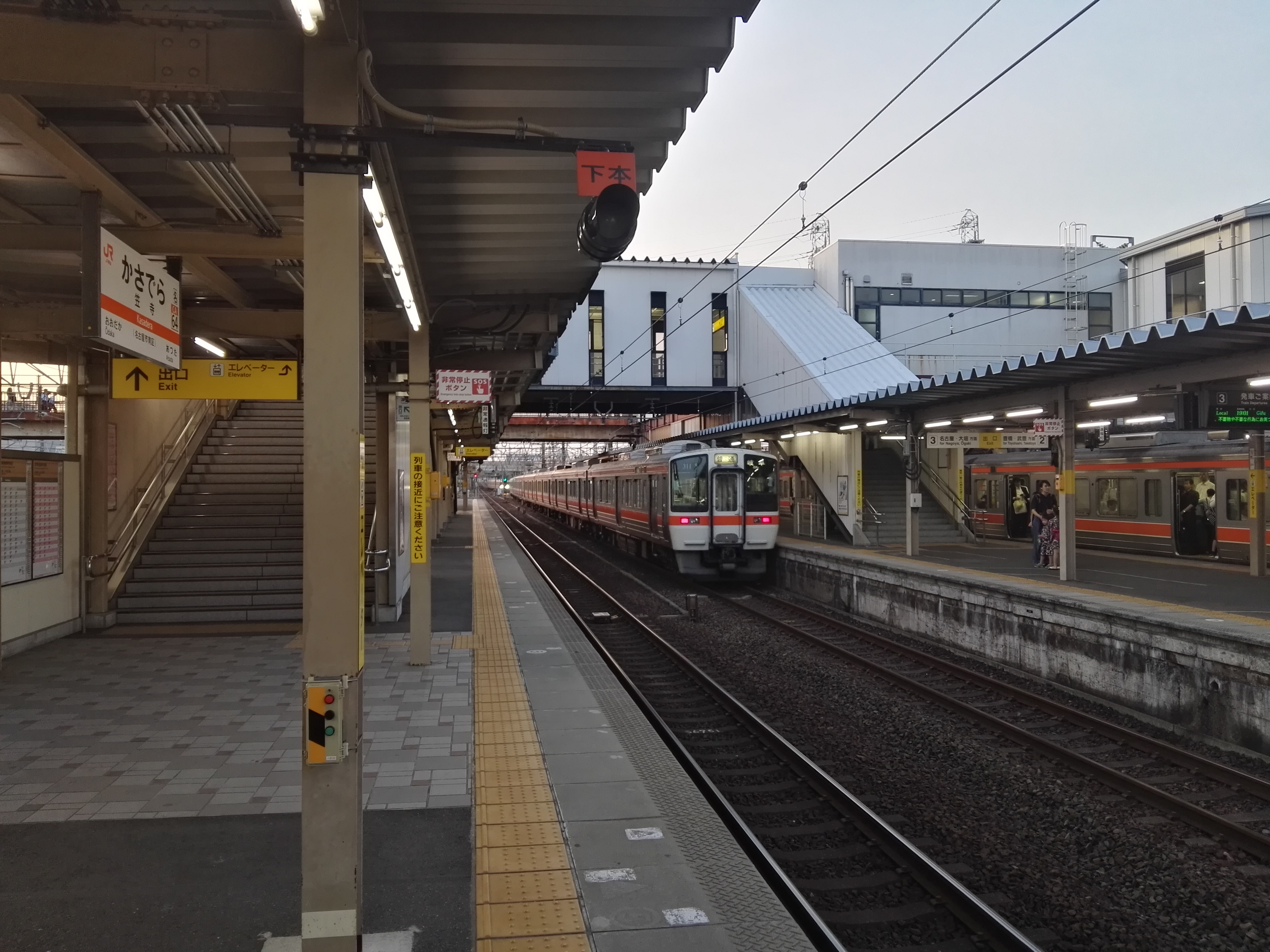
Platform

Kasadera Station (笠寺駅, Kasadera-eki) is a railway station in Minami-ku, Nagoya, Japan, operated by Central Japan Railway Company (JR Tōkai). It is also a terminal station for the freight-only Nagoya Rinkai Railway Tōkō Line.

== Lines ==
Kasadera Station is served by the Tōkaidō Main Line, and is located 356.8 kilometers from the starting point of the line at Tokyo Station.

== Station layout ==
The station has one island platform and two opposed side platforms connected to the station building by a footbridge. The station building has automated ticket machines, TOICA automated turnstiles and a staffed ticket office.

=== Platforms ===
1, 2	■ Tōkaidō Main Line	for Taketoyo and Toyohashi
3, 4	■ Tōkaidō Main Line	for Nagoya and Ōgaki

== Station history ==
Kasadera Station was established on 10 April 1942 as a signal stop on the Japanese Government Railways (JGR), primarily to serve a large military ordnance factory active during World War II. It was elevated to full station status on 1 June 1943. The station was destroyed during the Nagoya Air Raid of 17 May 1945 and was rebuilt in February 1949. The JGR became the JNR after the end of the war. A new station was built in May 1964. The Nagoya Rinkai Railway began operations in August 1965, and all freight operations were transferred to this company after May 1981. With the privatization and dissolution of the JNR on 1 April 1987, the station came under the control of the Central Japan Railway Company. A new station building was completed in April 1988.

Station numbering was introduced to the section of the Tōkaidō Line operated JR Central in March 2018; Kasadera Station was assigned station number CA64.

== Passenger statistics ==
In fiscal 2017, the station was used by an average of 7,830 passengers daily

== Surrounding area ==
- Nippon Gaishi Hall

== See also ==
- List of railway stations in Japan
