= Ecomyca =

Contactless smart card used in Japan

ecomyca
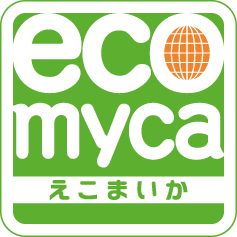
- Location: Toyama Prefecture
- Launched: February 2010
- Technology: FeliCa
- Operator: Toyama Chihō Railway
- Currency: Japanese yen
- Stored-value: Pay as you go
- Credit expiry: None
- Retailed: Toyama Chiho Railway stations and other select sales offices
- Website: (in Japanese) Official site

ecomyca (えこまいか) is a rechargeable contactless smart card issued by the Toyama Chihō Railway in Japan since 2010. The name is a portmanteau of "ecology" and "my card", and is a play on the Toyama dialect "ikomaika" (行こまいか) which translates to "let's go".

The card supersedes the contactless passca (パスカ, pasuka) card issued by the Toyama Light Rail from 29 April 2006, until its merger with the Toyama Chihō Railway on 31 October 2019.

== Functions and services ==
ecomyca cards are contactless payment cards, used on the Toyama Chihō Railway, Toyama Light Rail, and Maidohaya community bus routes in Toyama. The minimum cost is ¥2,000, including a ¥500 deposit.

ecomyca cards can also be used in Toyama's Cyclocity bike share scheme.

On 30 September 2019, the Toyama Chihō Railway operator announced ecomyca cards and their stored values will no longer expire after ten years.

== Interoperability ==
Japanese IC card interoperability

JR West announced IC cards in Japan's Nationwide Mutual Usage Service including ICOCA, Kitaca, Suica, PASMO, manaca, TOICA, PiTaPa, Hayakaken, nimoca, and SUGOCA would be accepted alongside ecomyca starting 10 October 2021.

However, ecomyca cards carry discounted fares, and national IC cards cannot yet be recharged at Toyama Chihō Railway stations.

== Technology ==
ecomyca cards incorporates contactless RFID technology developed by Sony called FeliCa, in common with other Japanese and global IC card tickets.

== Mobile devices ==
Toyama City's Toyo Activity (とほ活, tohokatsu) smartphone app can be used to check balances on compatible iOS and Android hardware supporting NFC.

== See also ==
- List of public transport smart cards
- Transportation in Toyama
