= Etchū-Nakajima Station =

Tram station in Toyama, Japan

Coordinates: 36°43′21″N 137°13′30″E

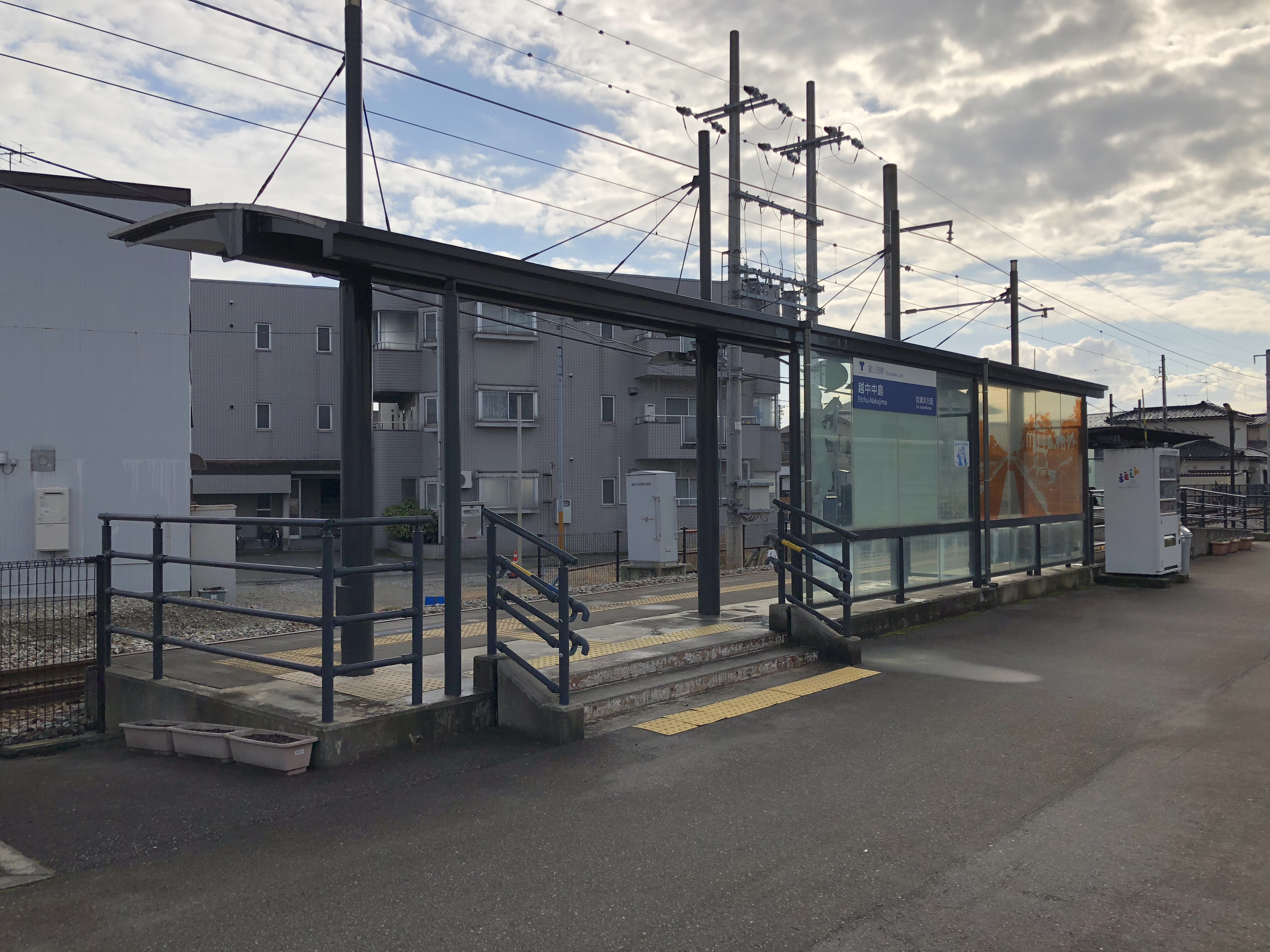
Etchū-Nakajima Station in January 2018

Etchū-Nakajima Station (越中中島駅, Etchū-Nakajima-eki) is a station on the Toyama Chihō Railway Toyamakō Line in Toyama, Japan.

== History ==
The station was originally opened in 1924 as a part of the Fugan Railway. It was later requisitioned by the Japanese government during WWII and became a part of Japanese National Railways. It was during this period the station became a part of the Toyamakō line. It continued to be operated by the West Japan Railway Company after privatisation. In 2006 the station reopened as a part of the new LRT line run by the Toyama Chihō Railway.

== Facilities ==
The station consists of a single platform and there is a vending machine located opposite the shelter.
