= Takaotozan Railway =

Transport company in Tokyo, Japan

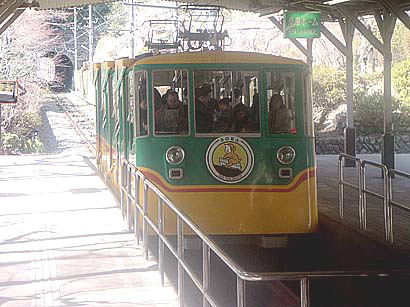
Takaotozan Railway funicular

The Takaotozan Railway (高尾登山電鉄, Takao Tozan Dentetsu) is a transport company in Hachiōji, Tokyo, Japan. The company operates a funicular line and a ropeway to Mount Takao, a popular destination for mountain trekking among Tokyo residents. The company was founded on September 29, 1921.

== Funicular ==
The funicular line, commonly known as the Takao Tozan Cable (高尾登山ケーブル, Takao Tozan Kēburu) line, is the steepest railway line in Japan, with a 608‰ (31°) elevation at maximum.

=== Basic data ===
- Distance: 1.0 km / 0.6 mi.
- Gauge: 1,067 mm (3 ft 6 in)
- Stations: 2
- Vertical interval: 271 m / 889 ft.

=== Cars ===
Two cars are used, both of them made by Hitachi, 1968. They are named Aoba (green leaf) and Momiji (maple leaf), respectively. The cars are connected at opposite ends of the cable, so they move synchronously and counterweight each other.

=== Services ===
Cars are operated once every 15 minutes, with the entire ride taking 5 minutes. Fares are 490 yen one-way and 950 yen return for adults (250/470 yen for children). Although more expensive per kilometer when compared to other Japanese railway lines (including the shinkansen), fares on the Takao Mountain Railroad funicular compare with those on similar systems such as the Ōyama Cable Car.

=== Stations ===
- Kiyotaki Station (清滝): 201 m elevation. Transfer to Takaosan-guchi on the Keiō Takao Line (5 minutes walk).
- Takaosan Station (高尾山): 472 m elevation.
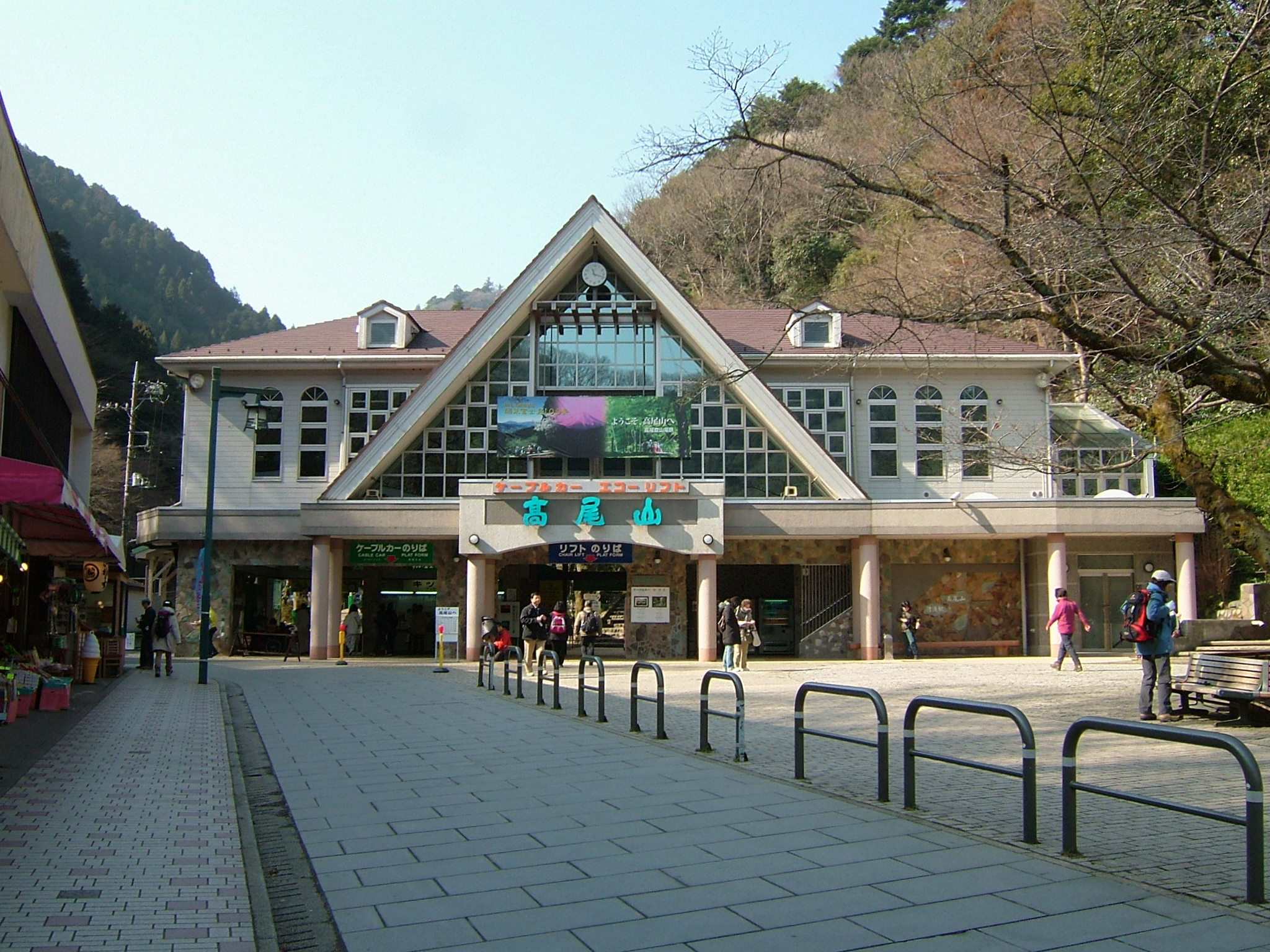
Kiyotaki Station

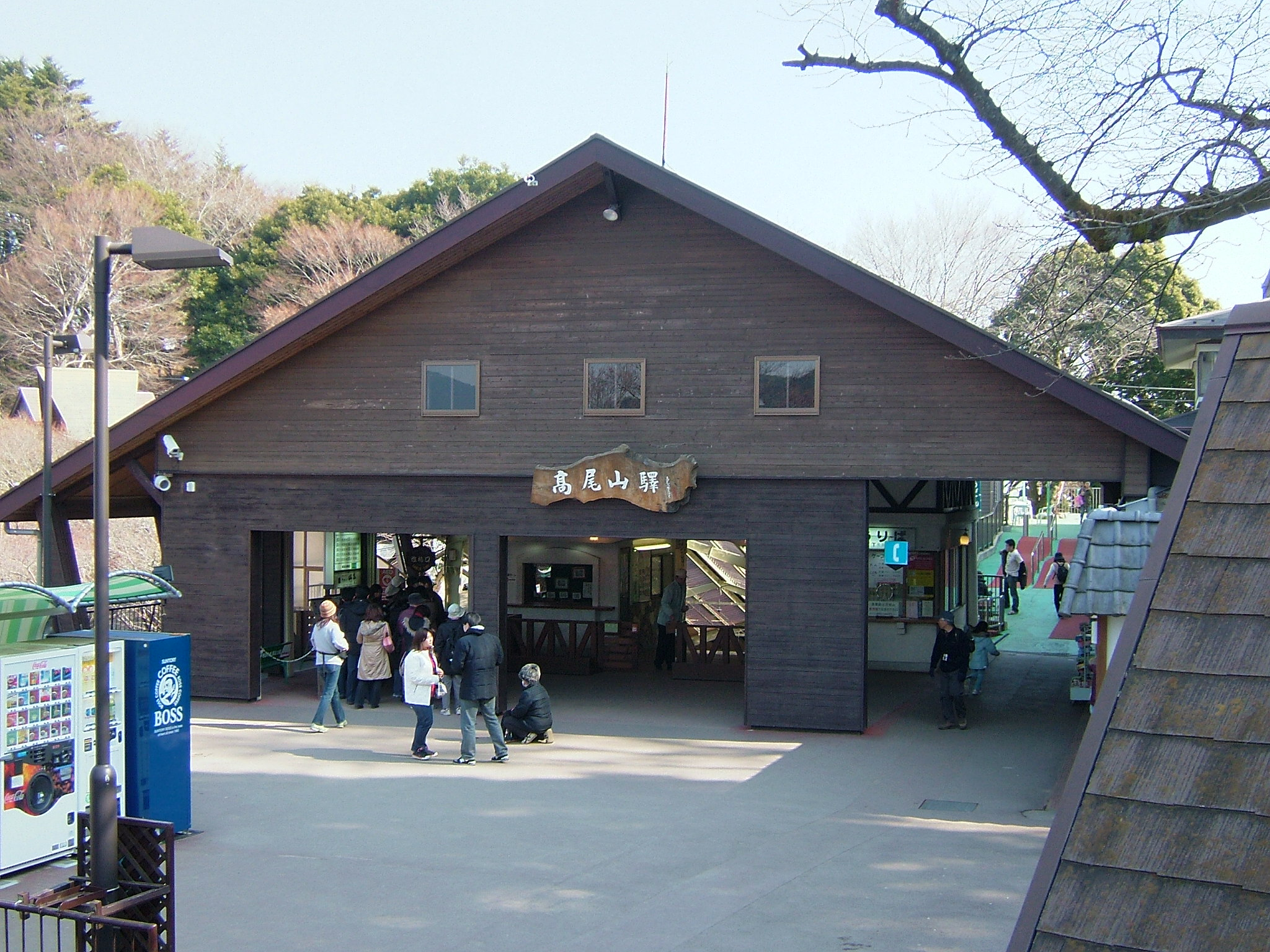
Takaosan Station

== Ropeway ==
The ropeway is nicknamed "Echo Lift."

=== Basic data ===
- Distance: 872 m / 2,861 ft.
- Stations: 2
- Vertical interval: 237 m / 778 ft.

=== Stations ===
- Sanroku Station (山麓): 224 m elevation. 5 minutes walk from Takaosan-guchi Station.
- Sanjō Station (山上): 462 m elevation.

== See also ==
- List of railway companies in Japan
- Funicular railway
- List of funicular railways
