= Yakuri Cable =

Japanese funicular line

Coordinates: 34°21′28.5″N 134°8′22.5″E

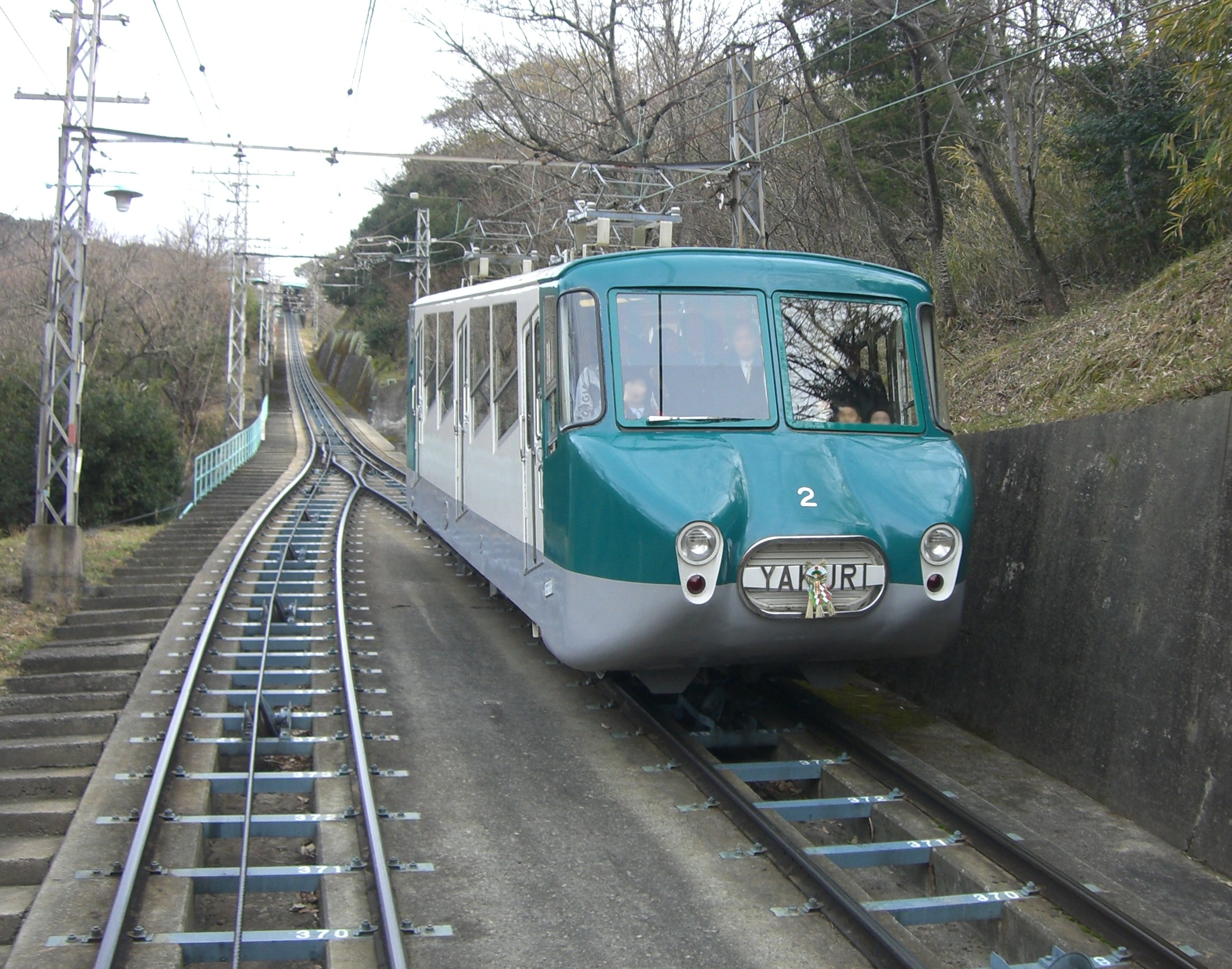
- A cable car bound for Yakuri Tozanguchi Station in 2007

Overview
- Other name: Yakuri Funicular Railway Line

Service
- Type: Funicular railway

The Yakuri Cable (八栗ケーブル, Yakuri Kēburu) is a Japanese funicular line in Takamatsu, Kagawa. The line does not have any official name. This is the only funicular line Shikoku Cable operates, while it also operates aerial tramways. The line opened in 1931 as a route to Yakuri-ji, the 85th temple of Shikoku Pilgrimage. In Shikoku Cable's official safety reports, the name Yakuri Funicular Railway Line is also used to refer to the line.

== History ==
The Yakuri Mountain Railway was established in December 1928. The entire line was opened on 15 February 1931. The infrastructure of the line was removed during the Pacific War, halting all operations. The line returned to operations on 28 December 1964, under a new operator. The line prior to Shikoku Cable ownership and the line under the company's ownership is treated as a separate line, as the line was formally closed between the Pacific War and 1964. Because of this, The company celebrated the line's 60th year in 2025.

== Infrastructure and operations ==
The line runs between Yakuri Tozanguchi Station and Yakuri Sanjo Station.

== See also ==
- List of funicular railways
- List of railway companies in Japan
- List of railway lines in Japan
