= Passca =

Ticketing system in Japan

pass-ca commuter pass.

passca (パスカ, pasuka) was a rechargeable contactless smart card ticketing system for public transport in Toyama, Japan, introduced by Toyama Light Rail on April 29, 2006 for use on the Toyamakō Line. Just like JR East's Suica or JR West's ICOCA, the card uses RFID technology developed by Sony corporation known as FeliCa, but does not have integrated services with other cards.

New passca cards stopped being issued on October 31, 2019 in preparation for the merger of Toyama Light Rail with Toyama Chihō Railway, which was completed on February 22, 2020. The card has been superseded by ecomyca.

== Types of cards ==
- passca prepaid cards
  - Normal card
  - Child's card
  - Special discount card: for handicapped customers.
- passca commuter pass
- Keirin-only passca: for Keirin spectators. On a racing day, one lap to/from Keirinjō-mae (Keirin velodrome) Station becomes free of charge.
