= Taiheiyō Coal Services and Transportation Rinkō Line =

Railway line in Japan

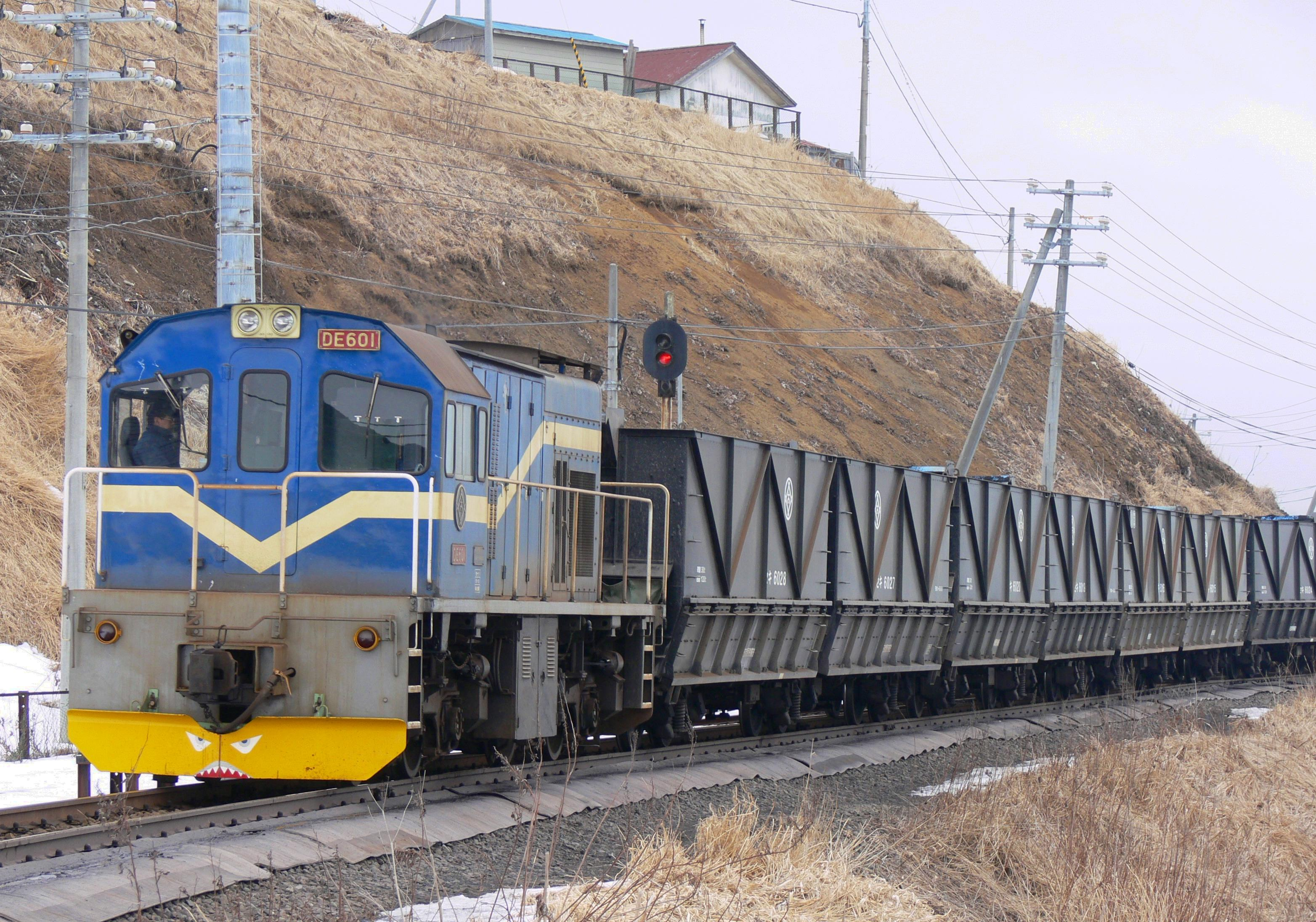
Rinkō Line coal train in February 2006

The Rinkō Line (臨港線, Rinkō-sen; "Portside Line") was a Japanese freight only railway line between Harutori and Shireto, all within Kushiro, Hokkaidō. It was the only railway line of Taiheiyō Coal Services and Transportation (太平洋石炭販売輸送, Taiheiyō Sekitan Hanbai Yusō). The line was the only private railway in Hokkaidō, as well as the only surviving colliery railway in Japan. The first section of the line opened in 1925. It also had a passenger service until 1966. The line transported coals from the mine to Port of Kushiro until its closure in 2019.

== Basic data ==
- Distance: 4 km
- Gauge: 1,067 mm
- Stations: 2
- Track: single
- Traction: internal combustion (diesel)

== History ==
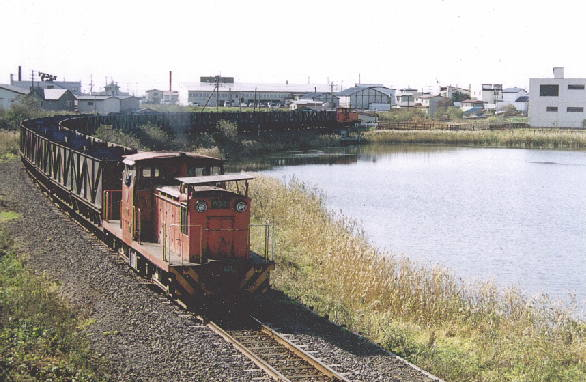
Rinkō Line coal train in October 2001

The Pacific Ocean Coal Co. opened a 6 km line from the coal mine at Harutori to Irifune-cho wharf in 1925/27, with a 3 km line connecting the mine to Higashi-Kushiro opening in 1928.

The line was truncated 2 km in 1966 when a new coal loading wharf opened, the passenger service ceasing at the same time.

The Pacific Ocean Coal Co. merged with Taiheiyō Coal Services and Transportation Co. in 1979.

The Higashi-Kushiro - Harutori section closed in 1986, with the remaining section continuing to operate.

Operations on the line ceased in March 2019. A farewell run was operated on April 6, 2019. The line closed in June 2019.

== Rail Roads ==
=== Routes ===
- Rinko Line between Harutori Station and Chiren Station (Freight Specialty, Abolished on June 30, 2019)

=== Fleet ===
- Diesel–electric powertrain - D401, DE601(New Zealand DH class locomotive), D701, D801

== After the line was abandoned ==
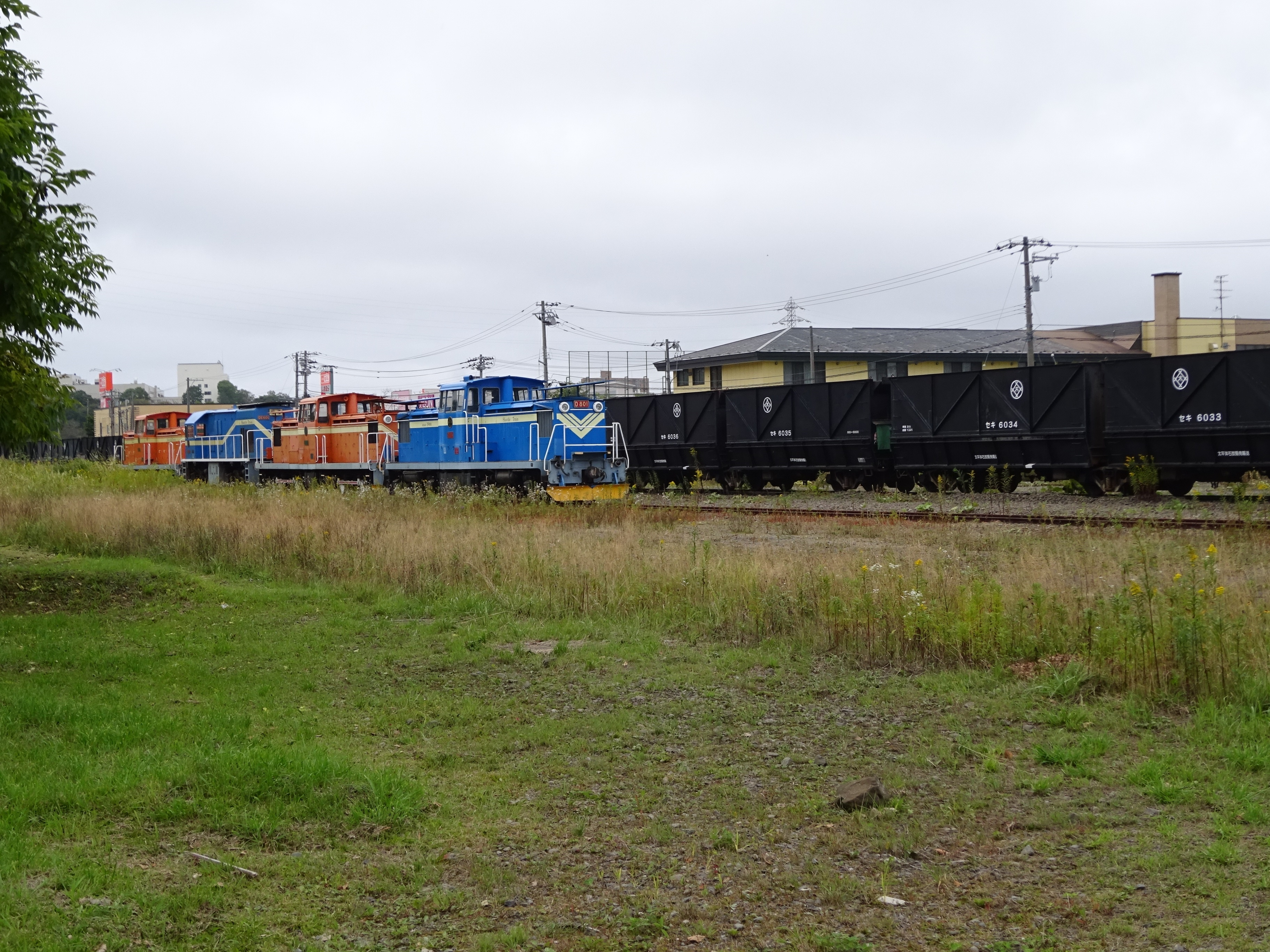
Locomotives and coal cars detained at the former Haruori Station

As of May 2020, the track has been removed, but local volunteers are using materials such as scrap materials and photographs of the level crossing, and the vehicles (4 locomotives, 28 freight cars) stored at the former Haruori Station by the operating parent company Shin Taipei Shoji (4 locomotives, 28 freight cars) as industrial heritage for tourism and other purposes. However, after that, once a sale contract was signed with a company that handles used railroad vehicles, the contract was dissolved due to soaring transportation costs due to the influence of the COVID-19 pandemic, and it was difficult to save it by a railway enthusiast group and raise maintenance costs, etc., and it was dismantled from October 2022.

== See also ==
- List of railway companies in Japan
- List of railway lines in Japan
