= Keiyō Rinkai Railway Rinkai Main Line =

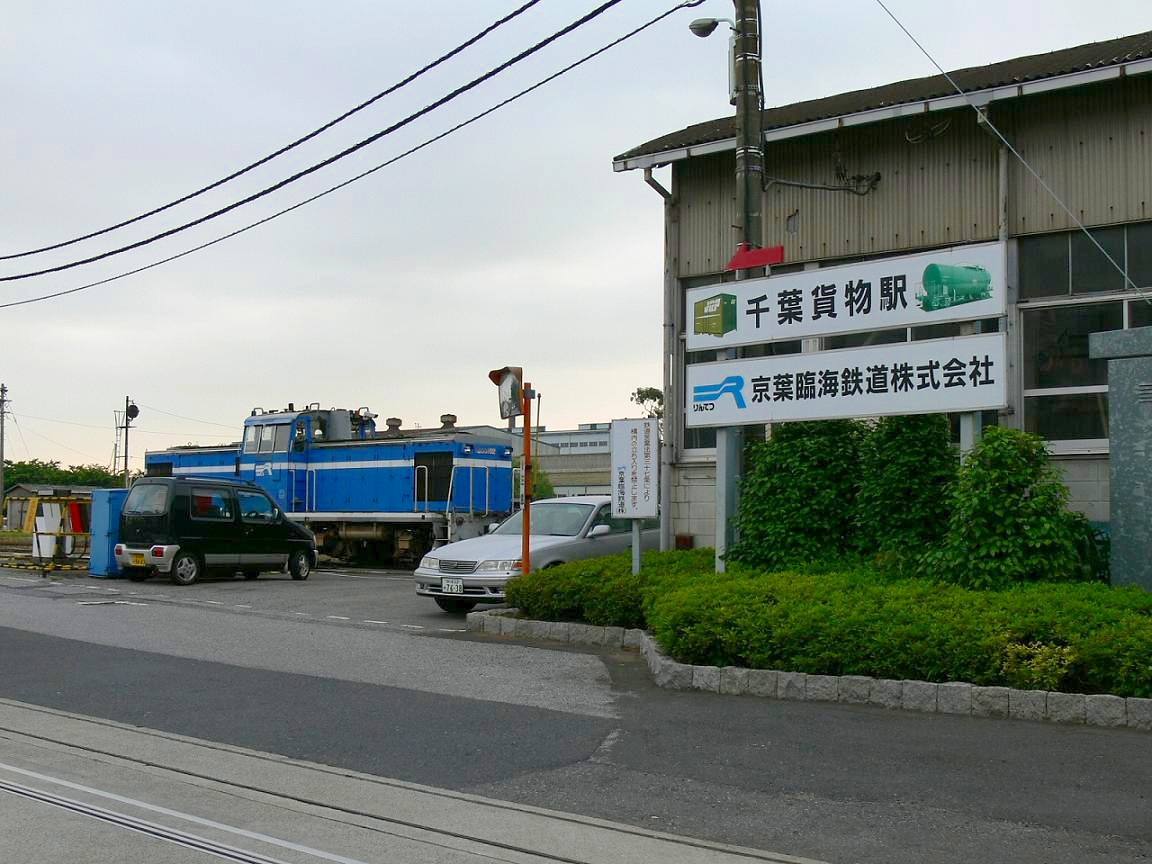
- Chiba Freight Terminal

Overview
- Other name(s): Keiyō Rinkai Tetsudō Rinkai Honsen
- Native name: 京葉臨海鉄道臨海本線
- Locale: Chiba Prefecture
- Termini: Soga, Chiba; Kitasode, Sodegaura
- Stations: 10

Service
- Type: Freight-only line
- Operator(s): Keiyō Rinkai Railway

History
- Opened: 1962

Technical
- Line length: 19.9 km (12.4 mi)
- Track gauge: 1,067 mm (3 ft 6 in)

The Keiyō Rinkai Railway Rinkai Main Line (京葉臨海鉄道臨海本線, Keiyō Rinkai Tetsudō Rinkai Honsen) is a Japanese freight-only railway line in Chiba Prefecture, between Soga, Chiba and Kitasode, Sodegaura. This is the only railway line Keiyō Rinkai Railway (京葉臨海鉄道, Keiyō Rinkai Tetsudō, "Keiyō Seaside Railway") operates, but the line has two branch lines as well. The company is abbreviated as Rintetsu (臨鉄). The third sector company was founded in 1962. The line mainly transports containers or petroleum for the Keiyō Industrial Zone on Port of Chiba, Tokyo Bay.

== Basic data ==
- Distance:
  - Soga — Kitasode: 19.9 km
  - Ichihara Junction — Keiyō-Ichihara: 1.6 km
  - Kitasode Junction — Keiyō-Kubota: 2.3 km
- Gauge: 1,067 mm
- Stations: 10
- Track: Single
- Power: Diesel
- Railway signalling: Simplified automatic

== See also ==
- List of railway companies in Japan
- List of railway lines in Japan
