= Beppu Rakutenchi Cable Line =

Cable railway in Beppu, Japan

Coordinates: 33°16′29.2″N 131°29′3.6″E

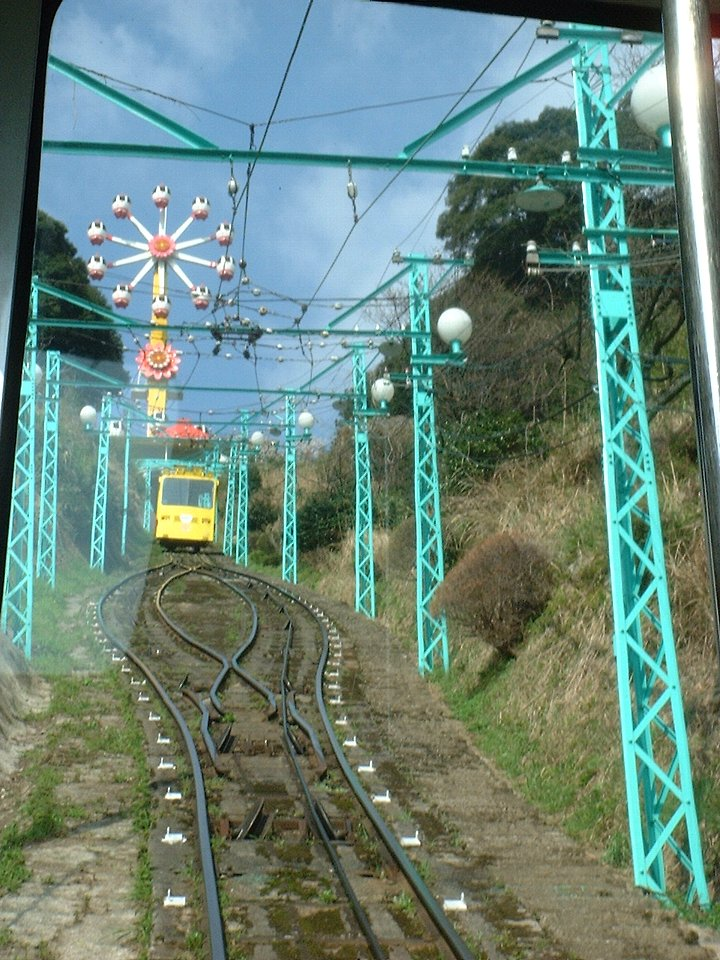
Beppu Rakutenchi Cable funicular.

The Beppu Rakutenchi Cable Line (別府ラクテンチケーブル線, Beppu Rakutenchi Kēburu-sen) is a Japanese funicular line in Beppu, Ōita. The line opened in 1929 as a gateway to Beppu Rakutenchi amusement park on Mount Tateishi. Although the line is legally considered as a public transit, not an attraction ride, riders have to pay the amusement park admission fee to take the funicular line. Local residents in Otobaru, the settlement on the mountain, are allowed to ride the line without the fee. The line is unique in the country as it is operated by Okamoto MFG (岡本製作所, Okamoto Seisakujo), an amusement ride maker.

== Basic data ==
- Distance: 0.3 km or 0.19 mi
- System: Single track with two cars
- Gauge: 1,067 mm or 3 ft 6 in
- Stations: 2
- Vertical interval: 122 m or 400 ft
- Maximum gradient: 558 ‰ or 55.8 %

== Business changes ==
In July 2008, Okamoto announced that it would close the park as of the end of August 2008 if it could not find a successor. One of the reasons of the setback was that it failed to invite a Chinese circus team with two pandas because of the 2008 Sichuan earthquake. In August, it was reported that Okamoto fortunately found a buyer for the park: Kyūshū Kankō Hōmu, a real estate company in Ōita. However, talks between the companies broke down in October 2008 and the park closed on November 30, 2008.

The park and funicular resumed business on July 18, 2009.

== See also ==
- List of funicular railways
- List of railway lines in Japan
- List of railway companies in Japan
