= Sendai Rinkai Railway =

Japanese railway company

Coordinates: 38°16′37.5″N 141°0′54.3″E

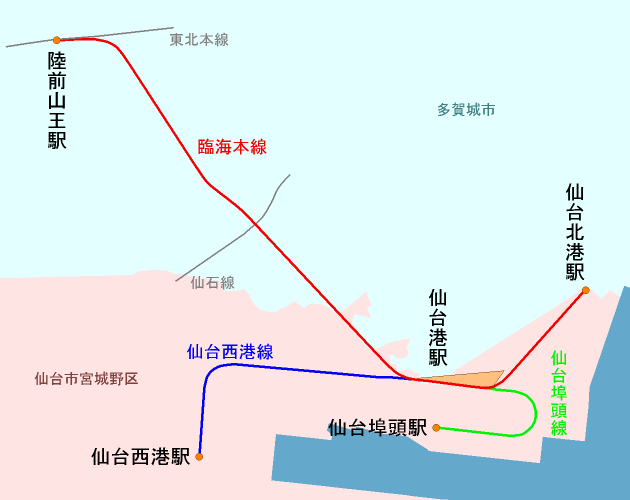
The map of Rinkai Main Line, Sendai West Port Line, and Sendai Pier Line.

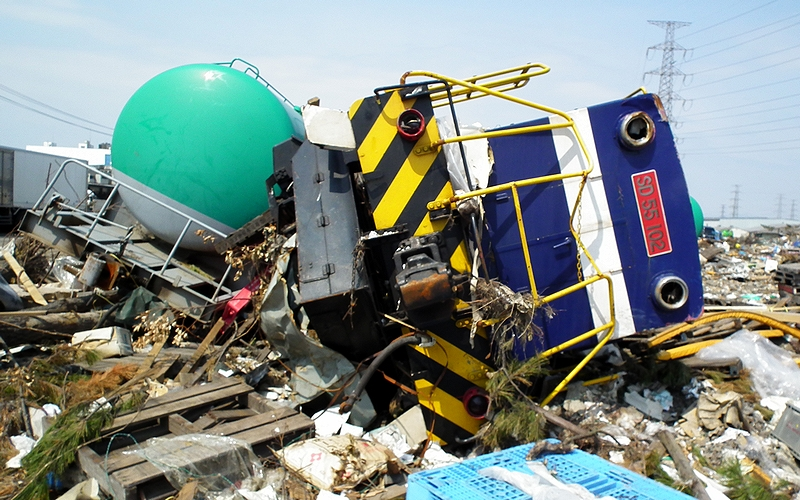
2011 tsunami damage

The Sendai Rinkai Railway (仙台臨海鉄道, Sendai Rinkai Tetsudō; "Sendai Seaside Railway") is the freight only railway company in Miyagi Prefecture, Japan. The third sector company was founded in 1970. Its lines transport containers or petroleum between Tōhoku Main Line and the industrial area of Port of Sendai. The lines were damaged by the 2011 Great East Japan earthquake and returned to service in 2012.

== Lines ==
- Rinkai Main Line (臨海本線, "Seaside Main Line") opened 1971
  - Rikuzan-Sannō — Sendai-Kitakō: 5.4 km / 3.3 mi.
- Sendai Futō Line (仙台埠頭線 "Sendai Pier Line") opened 1975
  - Sendaikō — Sendai-Futō: 1.6 km / 1.0 mi.
- Sendai Nishikō Line (仙台西港線 "Sendai West Port Line") opened 1983
  - Sendaikō — Sendai-Nishikō: 2.0 km / 1.2 mi.

== See also ==
- List of railway companies in Japan
