= Ōyama Cable Car =

Japanese funicular line in Isehara, Kanagawa

Coordinates: 35°25′47.85″N 139°14′26.4″E

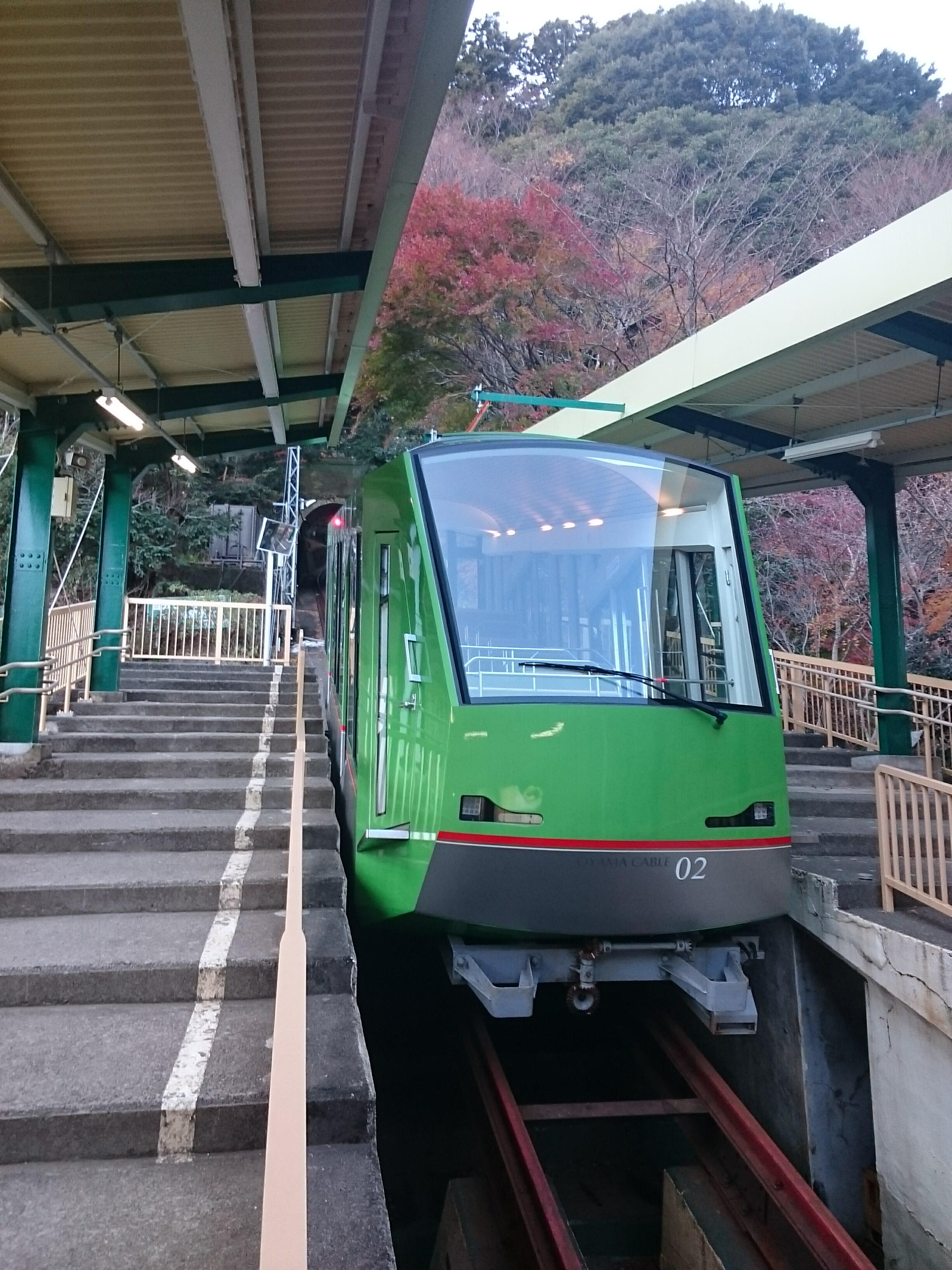
Ōyama Cable Car funicular

Ōyama Cable Car, 2022

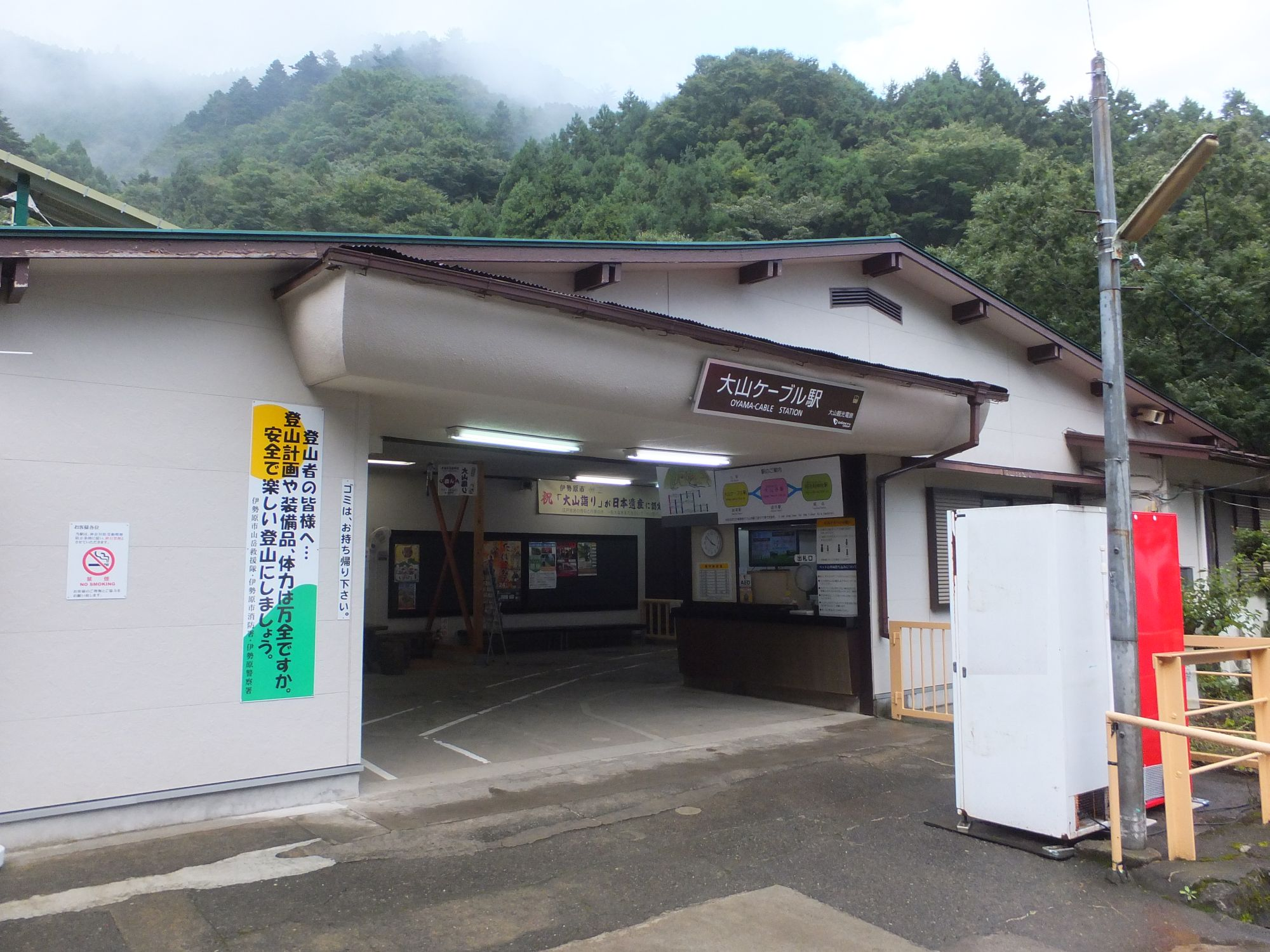
Ōyama Cable Station

The Ōyama Cable Car (大山ケーブルカー, Ōyama Kēburukā), officially the Ōyama Cable Line (大山鋼索線, Ōyama Kōsaku-sen), is a Japanese funicular line in Isehara, Kanagawa. This is the only line Ōyama Kankō Dentetsu (大山観光電鉄; "Ōyama Sightseeing Electric Railway") operates. The company belongs to Odakyū Group. The line opened in 1931, as a route to Ōyama Afuri Shrine on Mount Ōyama. The line is now also used for hiking.

== Basic data ==
- Distance: 0.8 km (0.5 mi)
- Gauge: 1,067 mm (3 ft 6 in)
- Stations: 3
- Vertical interval: 278 m (912 ft)

== Stations ==
The line has three stations. From the foot of the hill:

- Ōyama Cable Station (大山ケーブル駅)
- Ōyamadera Station (大山寺駅)
- Afurijinja Station (阿夫利神社駅)

All the stations were renamed on October 1, 2008. Their former names were Oiwake Station (追分駅), Fudōmae Station (不動前駅) and Shimosha Station (下社駅) respectively.

== See also ==
- List of funicular railways
- List of railway companies in Japan
- List of railway lines in Japan
