= Nagoya Rinkai Railway =

Japanese railway company

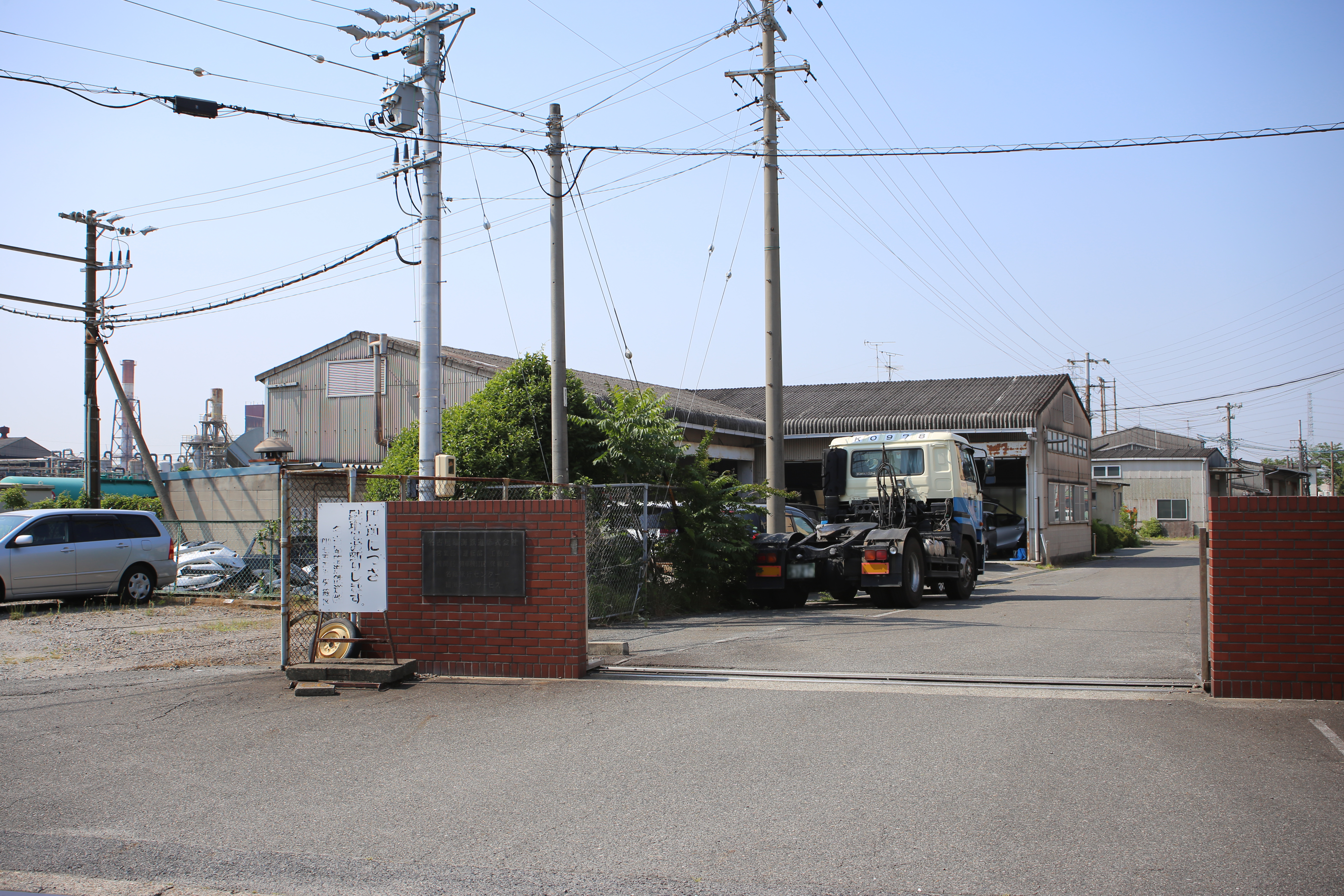
- Nagoya Rinkai Railway head office
- Native name: 名古屋臨海鉄道
- Romanized name: Nagoya Rinkai Tetsudō
- Type: Public-private KK
- Industry: Transportation
- Founded: 23 January 1965
- Website: http://www.meirintetu.co.jp/

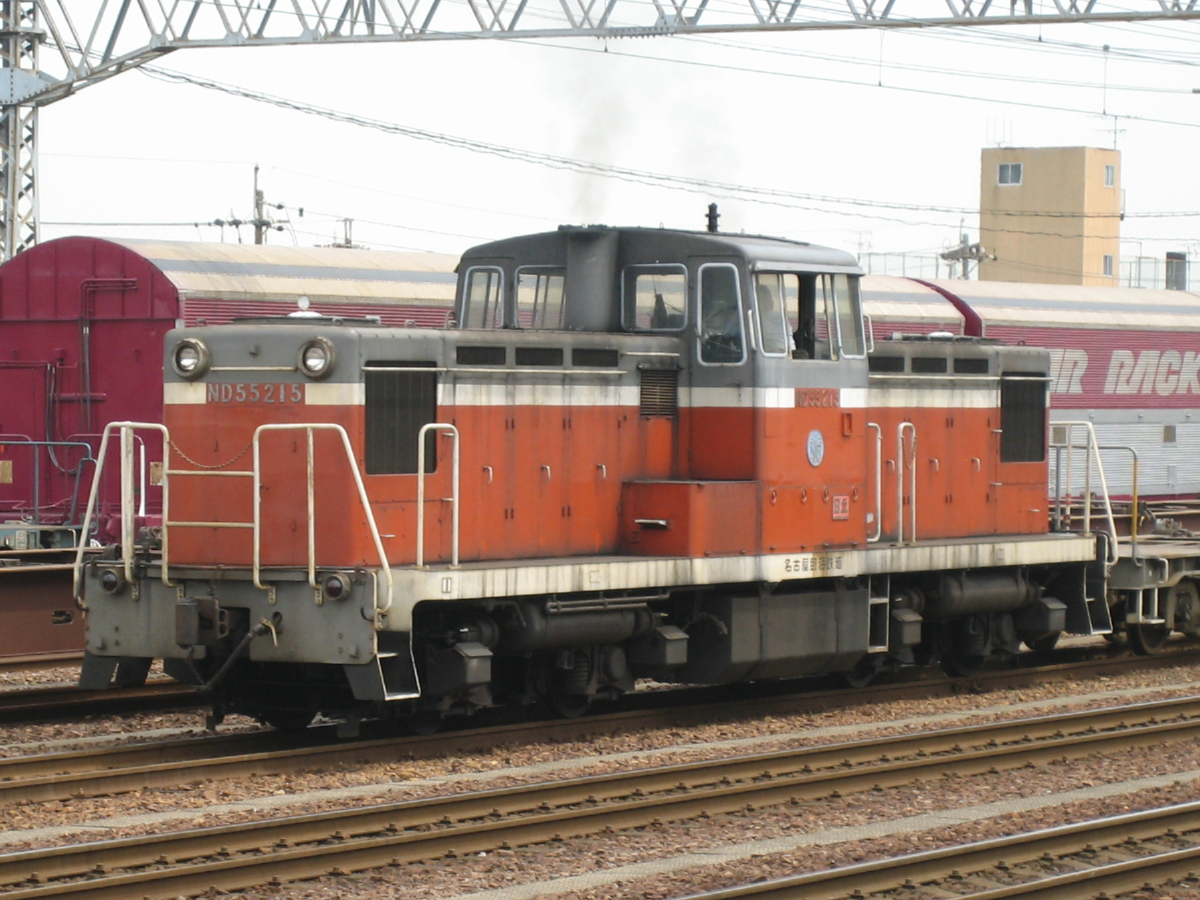
ND55 series diesel locomotive at Nagoya Freight Terminal

The Nagoya Rinkai Railway (名古屋臨海鉄道, Nagoya Rinkai Tetsudō; "Nagoya Seaside Railway") is a Japanese freight-only railway company in Nagoya, Aichi, shared by Japan Freight Railway Company, Nagoya Port Authority, and Nippon Express. The third sector company (in a sense in Japan) was founded in 1965. The company is abbreviated as Meirin (名臨). Its lines serve the industrial area of the Nagoya Port. They mainly transport limestones via Seinō Railway, chemical products, train cars of Nagoya Railroad, or car parts of Toyota Motor.

== Lines ==
- Tōkō Line (東港線) opened 1965
  - Kasadera — Tōkō: 3.8 km
- Shōwamachi Line (昭和町線) opened 1965
  - Tōkō — Shōwamachi: 1.1 km
- Shiomichō Line (汐見町線) opened 1930, transferred 1965
  - Tōkō — Shiomichō: 3.0 km
- Nankō Line (南港線) opened 1968
  - Tōkō — Chita: 11.3 km
- Tōchiku Line (東築線) opened 1965
  - Tōkō — Meiden-Chikkō: 1.3 km

== See also ==
- List of railway companies in Japan
