= Peachliner =

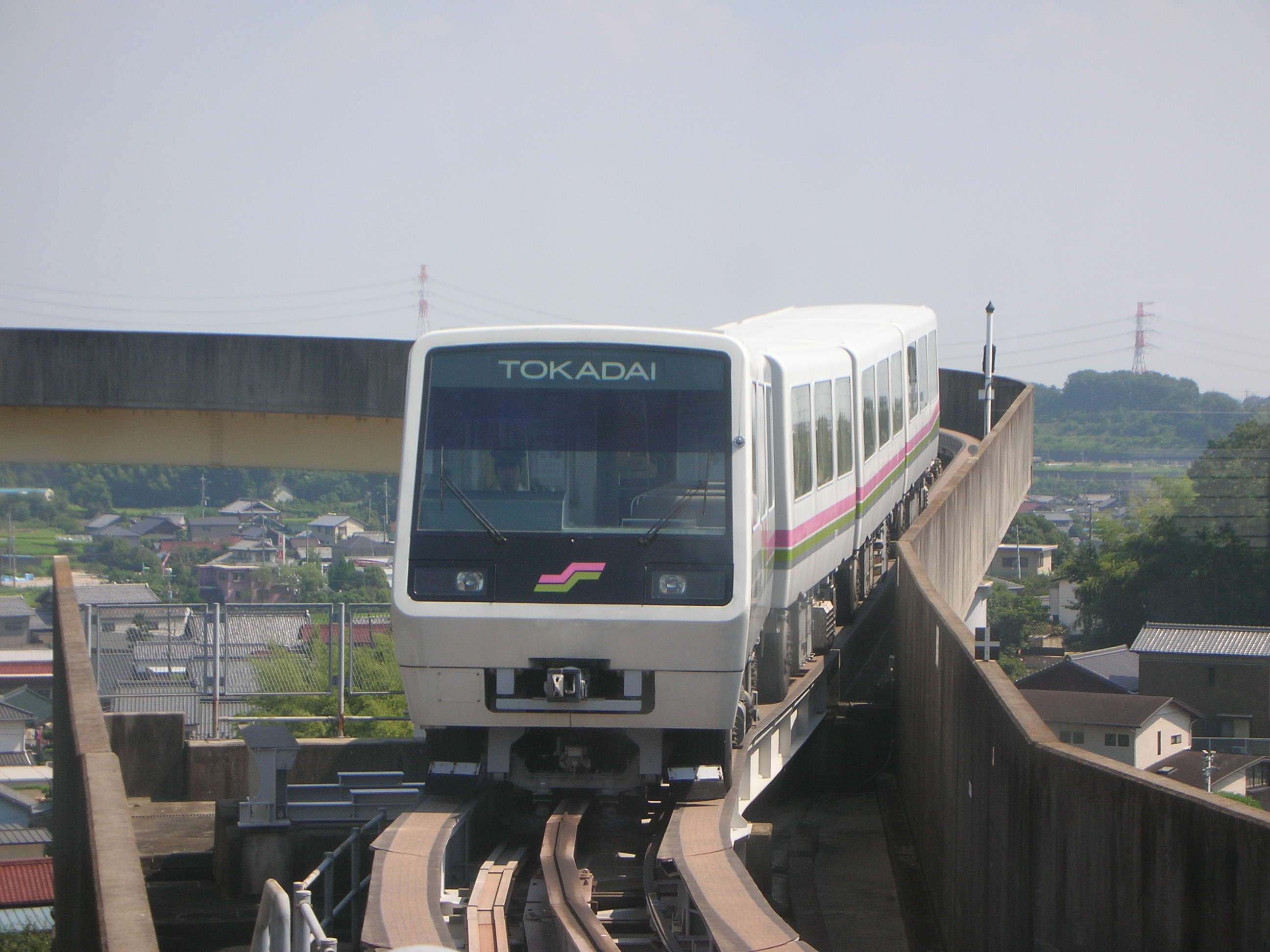
Peachliner train (2006)

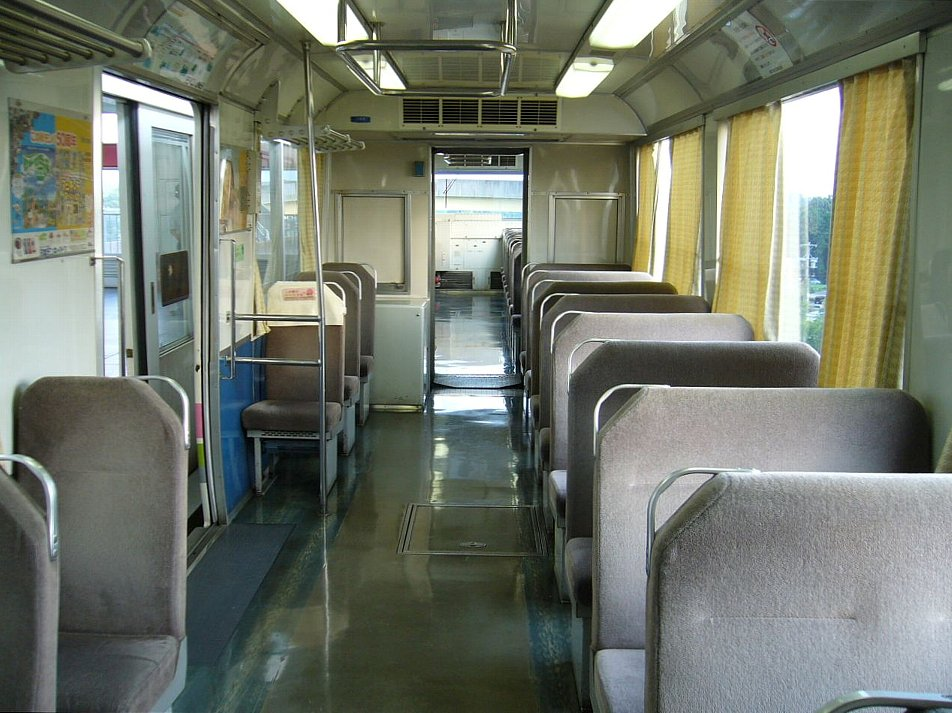
Interior of a Peachliner train (2006)

The Peachliner, formally the Tōkadai Shin-kōtsū Peach Liner (桃花台新交通ピーチライナー) was a people mover in the city of Komaki, Aichi Prefecture, Japan. It was operated by the company Tokadai New Transit from 1991 until September 30, 2006, when it became the first people mover system in Japan to cease operations. It was then dismantled in 2023.

== History ==
The planning of the line started in 1971 along with the planning of Tōkadai New Town, a planned city outside Komaki designed for 54,000 people. The decision to choose a people mover system was made in 1974, with a projected ridership of 43,000 passengers per day (ppd) and a budget of 24.5 billion yen, and a second stage to Kōzōji planned. However, in 1978, the town's planned size was cut down to 47,000 people and the ridership estimate was cut to 23,000 ppd. Construction started in 1981 based on this estimate.

In 1984, the town's design was again downsized to 40,000 people and the ridership to 20,000 ppd. A decision was also made to operate the line manually instead of in fully automated mode. The line was opened on March 25, 1991, charging ¥300 for an end-to-end trip, but by this time the ridership projection had been cut to just 12,000 passengers per day.

However, between 1991 and 2004 the line only averaged 2,670 passengers per day, amounting to only 6% of the original estimate and 22% of the opening-day projection. The maintenance of the line required some 11.5 billion yen per year, a tenth of Tokadai New Town's budget and, compared to construction costs of 31.3 billion yen, the equivalent of rebuilding the line from scratch every three years. According to calculations by the local chapter of the Japanese Communist Party (disputed by some town councillors), the building of the line had increased the original sale prices of apartments in the area by approximately one million yen.

By the mid-2000s, it had become time for the system to undergo replacement and renewal of equipment and infrastructure. Because of high costs, alternatives to the looming renewal were considered including the complete closure of the line and conversion to a guided bus route (similar to the Yutorito Line). By October 2005, accumulated losses amounted to ¥600 million. In November 2005, the plan to convert the line to a guided busway was rejected by Aichi Prefecture as it was too difficult and risky. The decision to close the line was made in December, and the line ceased operating on September 30, 2006.

It was completely dismantled in 2023.

== Operator ==
The Peachliner was operated by Tokadai New Transit (Tōkadai Shin-kōtsū). Stock in this third-sector railway was held by Aichi Prefecture (46%), the city of Komaki (10%), Meitetsu (10%), and others.

== Data ==
- Length: 7.4 km
- Stations: 7
- Multiple-track: Entire line
- Electrification: 750 V

Map of line

== Stations ==
- Komaki Station
- Komakihara Station
- Higashi Tanaka Station
- Kamisue Station
- Tōkadai-nishi Station
- Tōkadai-center Station
- Tōkadai-higashi Station

Komaki and Komakihara Stations remain in service on the Nagoya Railroad (Meitetsu) Komaki Line.
