= Toyama Chihō Railway Toyamakō Line =

Railway line in Japan

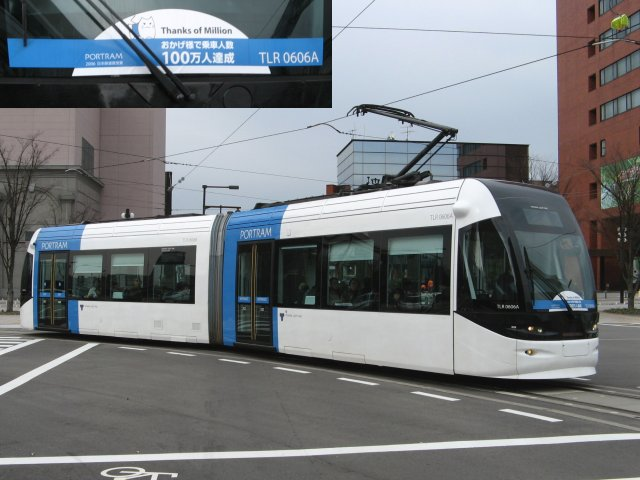
- A "Portram" car, introduced on the conversion to light rail

Overview
- Locale: Toyama, Japan
- Termini: Toyama-Eki; Iwasehama
- Stations: 13

Service
- Type: Light rail

History
- Opened: July 23, 1924 (original); April 29, 2006 (converted to light rail)

Technical
- Line length: 7.6 km (4.7 mi)
- Track gauge: 1,067 mm (3 ft 6 in)
- Electrification: 600 V DC
- Operating speed: 60 km/h (37 mph) (rail line); 40 km/h (25 mph) (tram line)

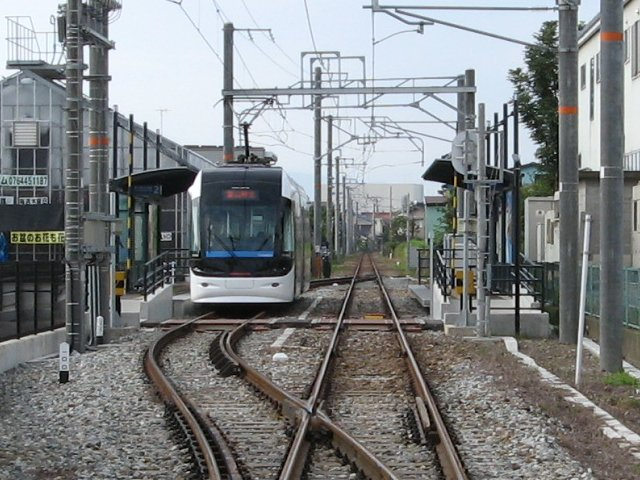
Newly built Awajima Station

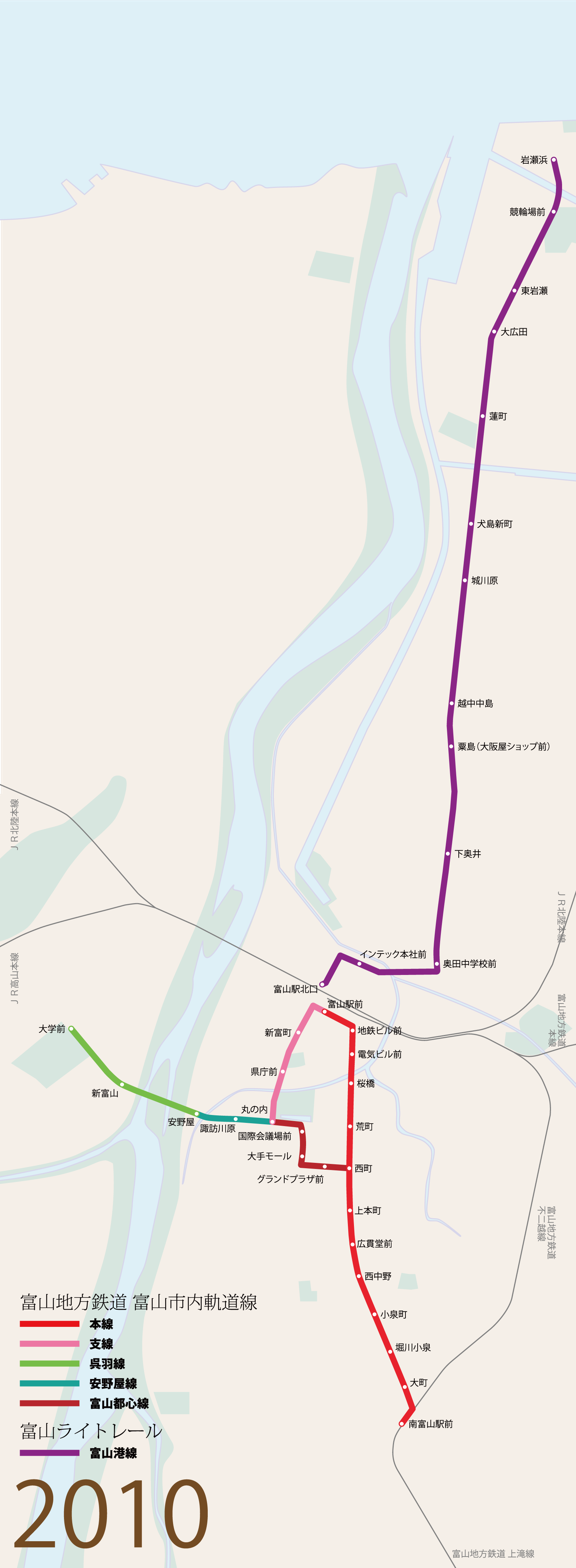
Map of Toyama tram lines

The Toyamakō Line (富山港線, Toyamakō-sen) is a tram line operated by Toyama Chihō Railway in the city of Toyama, the capital of Toyama Prefecture. Trams commences at Toyamaeki, beneath Toyama Station, and travels north to Iwasehama in a town of the Toyama Port on Sea of Japan.

The line is regarded as the first fully converted or constructed "light rail transit" (LRT) in Japan. Whilst other Japanese "LRTs" involve light rail rolling stock operating on original infrastructure, the "Portram" utilises new rolling stock on fully renovated infrastructure.

It has an official nickname "Portram'", after "port" (Toyama Port) and "tram".

== Description ==
Also see the route diagram.

- Distance: 7.85 km
  - Toyama-Eki – Okudachūgakkō-mae
    - under Tram Act, 1.35 km
  - Okudachūgakkōmae – Iwasehama
    - under Railway Business Act: 6.5 km
- Stations: 14
- Track: single
  - Doubling is planned at a short section of Okudachūgakkō-mae – east of Hatta bridge
- Railway signalling: automatic
- Depot: at Jōgawara

== History ==
The Toyamakō Line was built as a heavy railway line by the private Fugan Railway (富岩鉄道, Fugan Tetsudō) in 1924; it was electrified with 600 V DC overhead catenary. In December 1941, the company transferred the line to Toyama Electric Railway (富山電気鉄道, Toyama Denki Tetsudō), which was renamed to the Toyama Chihō Railway in 1943. The line was nationalized in June 1943 by Imperial Japanese Government Railways due to line's importance as a freight and materiel route to the port of Toyama.

The Japanese National Railways (JNR) modified the Toyamakō Line's electrification system to 1500 V DC, the last to be altered among JNR lines acquired from private companies. When JNR was privatized in 1987, the line became part of the West Japan Railway Company (JR West) network. During the time JR West operated the Toyamakō Line (which ended on 28 February 2006) it suffered a long period of declining passengers and the resulting reduction in service. The Toyama Light Rail Company, a public-private partnership with the Hokuriku Electric Power Company, Intec, and the municipal and prefectural governments as major shareholders, was set up to own and operate the line. It was modified for light rail services and reopened on April 29, 2006, returning it to service under a Toyama-based company after half a century of outside management.

Prior to the line's transfer in 2006, patronage was 1,700 passengers on weekdays and fewer than 750 on weekends. Under Toyama Light Rail ownership, the line proved to be surprisingly successful: 12,750 people rode the line on the first day. By November 9, 2006, one million passengers had used the line.

Since March 21, 2020, with the completion of a north south tram link across Toyama Railway Station, Portram services through operate into the Toyama City Tram system.

== Services ==
Approximately six services are operated in each direction per hour in the morning, 4 in the daytime to evening, 2 in the late night. Services typically through operate into the Toyama City Tram system.

The fare is JPY 200 for an adult, 100 for a child per ride, reduced to 160 for an adult and 80 for a child when using the Passca, a smart card ticketing system. Citizens of the city of Toyama over 65 years old are entitled to pay JPY 100 per ride in the daytime with the "Silver Passca".

"Feeder bus" services are provided at Hasumachi and Jōgawara.

== Rolling stock ==
Nicknamed "Portram", differently coloured 7 formations of TLR0600 type manufactured by Niigata Transys using Bombardier Transportation design, engineering, and technology based on the ADtranz low floor tram, were introduced to the line.

=== Former ===
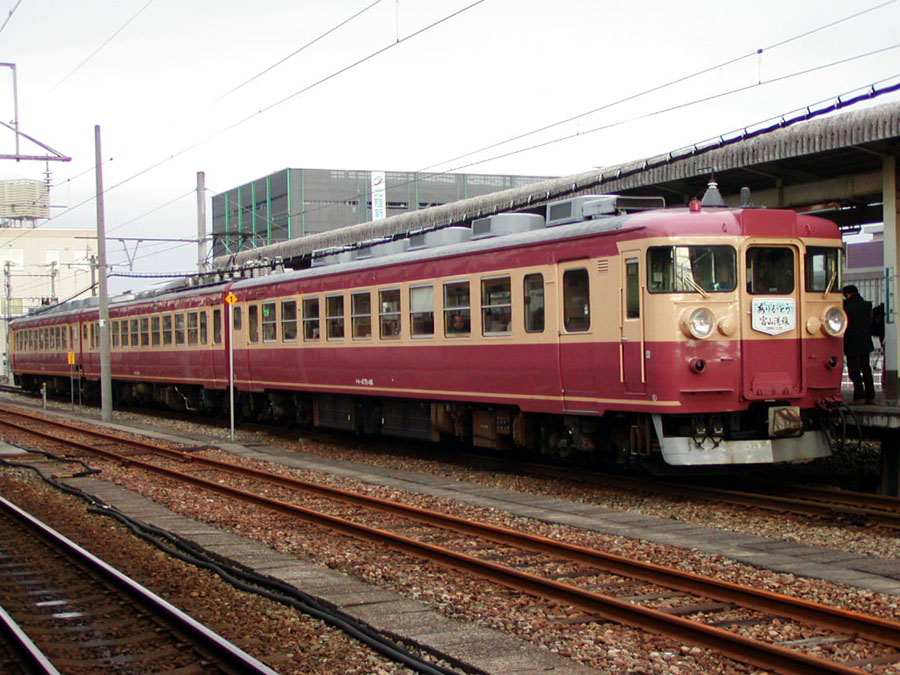
475 series on the Toyamakō Line, February 2006

- 72 series (from 1967 until 1985)
- 457/471/475 series (from 1985 until 2006)
- 413 series (until 2005)

== Stations ==
All stations are in the city of Toyama, Toyama Prefecture. For distances and connections, see the route diagram.

The naming rights of two stations were sold (shown by *), of four which were on sale.

- C15 Toyama (富山駅)
- C26 Oarks Canal Park Hotel Toyama-mae(オークスカナルパークホテル富山前停留場)
- C27 Intec-Honshamae* (インテック本社前駅)
- C28 Ryukokutoyamakōkō-mae (Eirakuchō)(龍谷富山高校前（永楽町）停留場)
- C29 Okudachūgakkōmae (奥田中学校前駅)
- C30 Shimo-Okui (下奥井駅)
- C31 Awajima (Ōsakaya-Shop-mae)* (粟島 (大阪屋ショップ前) 駅)
- C32 Etchū-Nakajima (越中中島駅)
- C33 Jōgawara (城川原駅)
- C34 Inujima-Shimmachi (犬島新町)
- C35 Hasumachi (Babakinenkōen-mae) (蓮町（馬場記念公園前）駅)
- C36 Hagiurashōgakkō-mae (萩浦小学校前駅)
- C37 Higashi-Iwase (東岩瀬駅)
- C38 Keirinjōmae (競輪場前駅)
- C39 Iwasehama (岩瀬浜駅)

== See also ==
- List of light-rail transit systems
- List of railway lines in Japan
