= List of railway lines in Japan (A to I) =

List of railway lines in Japan
#, A to I	J to P	R to Z

== Numbers ==
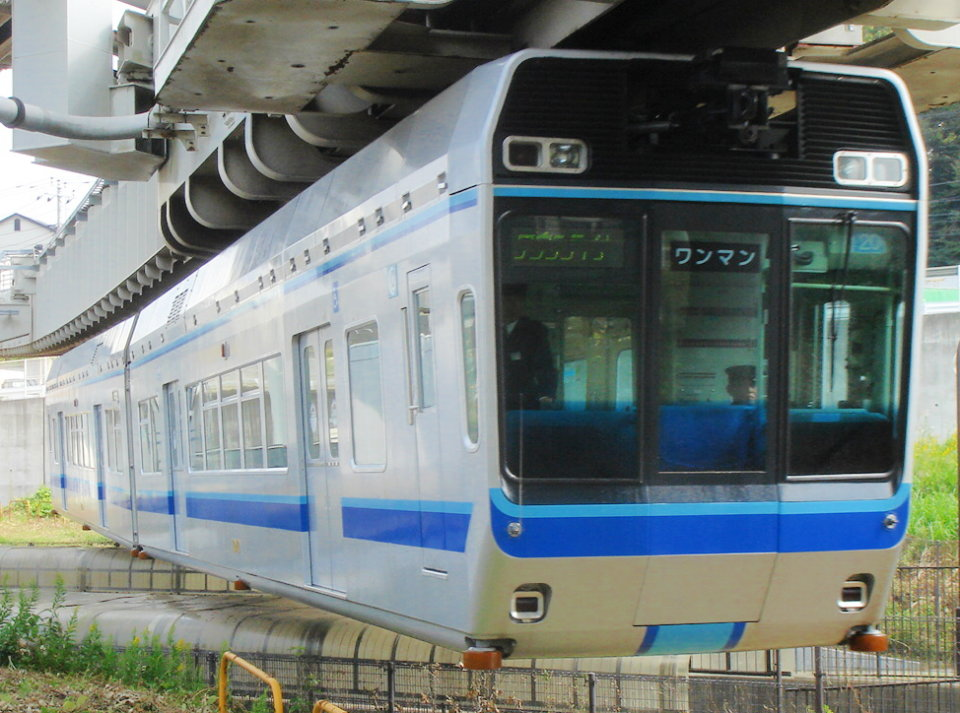
Chiba Urban Monorail Line 1

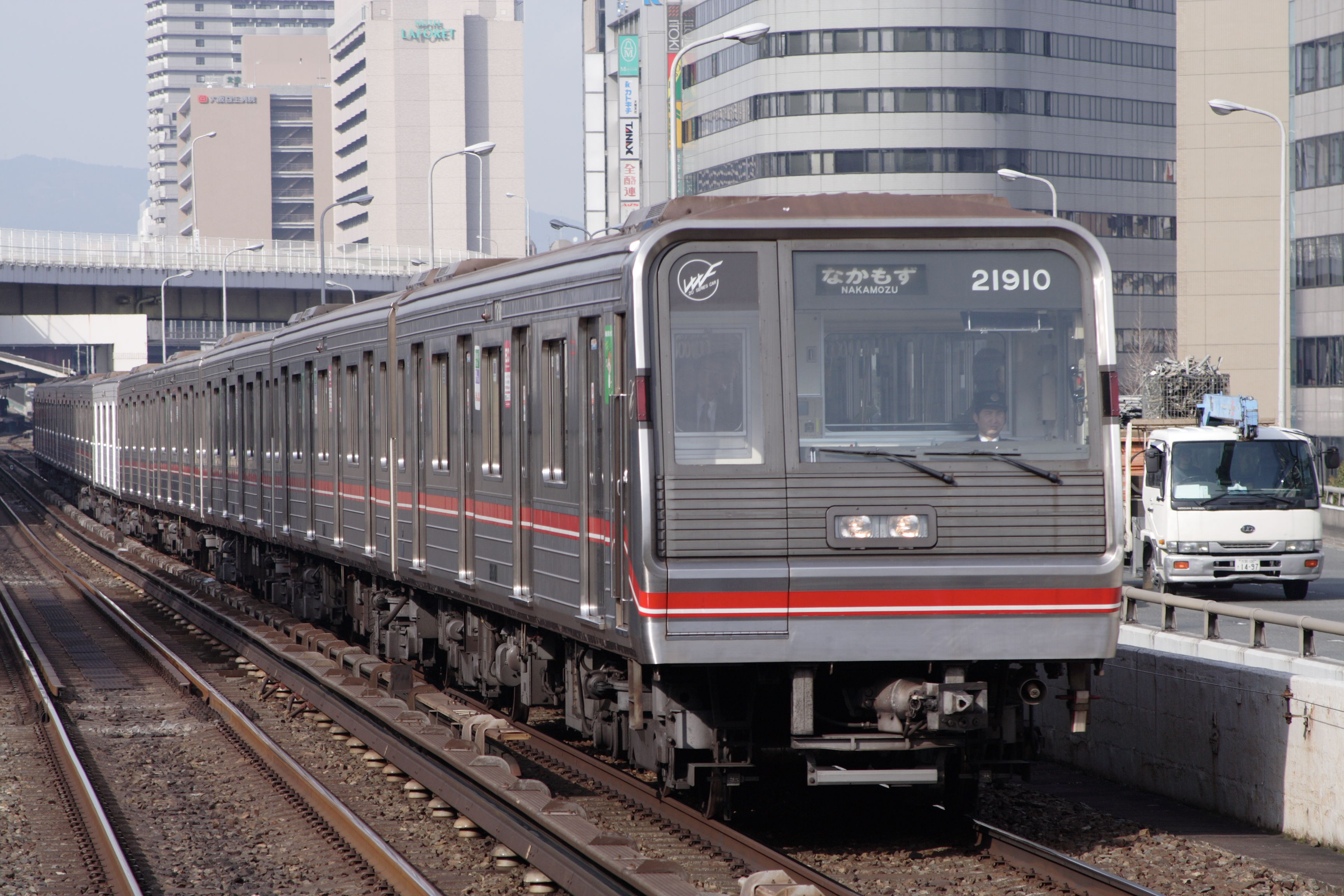
Osaka Municipal Subway Line 1 (Midōsuji Line)

- Line 1 (Chiba Urban Monorail)
- Line 1 (Astram Line) (Hiroshima Rapid Transit)
- Line 1 (Blue Line) (Yokohama City Transportation Bureau)
- Line 1 (Kūkō Line/Airport Line) (Fukuoka City Transportation Bureau)
- Line 1 (Midōsuji Line) (Osaka Municipal Transportation Bureau)
- Line 1 Asakusa Line (Tokyo Metropolitan Bureau of Transportation)
- Line 1 Higashiyama Line (Transportation Bureau City of Nagoya)
- Line 2 (Chiba Urban Monorail)
- Line 2 (Hakozaki Line) (Fukuoka City Transportation Bureau)
- Line 2 (Tanimachi Line) (Osaka Municipal Transportation Bureau)
- Line 2 Hibiya Line (Tokyo Metro)
- Line 2 Meijō Line (Transportation Bureau City of Nagoya)
- Line 2 Meikō Line (Transportation Bureau City of Nagoya)
- Line 3 (Blue Line) (Yokohama City Transportation Bureau)
- Line 3 (Nanakuma Line) (Fukuoka City Transportation Bureau)
- Line 3 (Yotsubashi Line) (Osaka Municipal Transportation Bureau)
- Line 3 Ginza Line (Tokyo Metro)
- Line 3 Tsurumai Line (Transportation Bureau City of Nagoya)
- Line 4 (Chūō Line) (Osaka Municipal Transportation Bureau)
- Line 4 (Green Line) (Yokohama City Transportation Bureau)
- Line 4 Marunouchi Branch Line (Tokyo Metro)
- Line 4 Marunouchi Line (Tokyo Metro)
- Line 4 Meijō Line (Transportation Bureau City of Nagoya)
- Line 5 (Sennichimae Line) (Osaka Municipal Transportation Bureau)
- Line 5 Tozai Line (Tokyo Metro)
- Line 6 (Sakaisuji Line) (Osaka Municipal Transportation Bureau)
- Line 6 Mita Line (Tokyo Metropolitan Bureau of Transportation)
- Line 6 Sakura-dōri Line (Transportation Bureau City of Nagoya)
- Line 7 (Nagahori Tsurumi-Ryokuchi Line) (Osaka Municipal Transportation Bureau)
- Line 7 Kamiiida Line (Transportation Bureau City of Nagoya)
- Line 7 Namboku Line (Tokyo Metro)
- Line 8 (Imazatosuji Line) (Osaka Municipal Transportation Bureau)
- Line 8 Yūrakuchō Line (Tokyo Metro)
- Line 9 Chiyoda Line (Tokyo Metro)
- Line 10 Shinjuku Line (Tokyo Metropolitan Bureau of Transportation)
- Line 11 Hanzōmon Line (Tokyo Metro)
- Line 12 Ōedo Line (Tokyo Metropolitan Bureau of Transportation)
- Line 13 Fukutoshin Line (Tokyo Metro)

== A ==
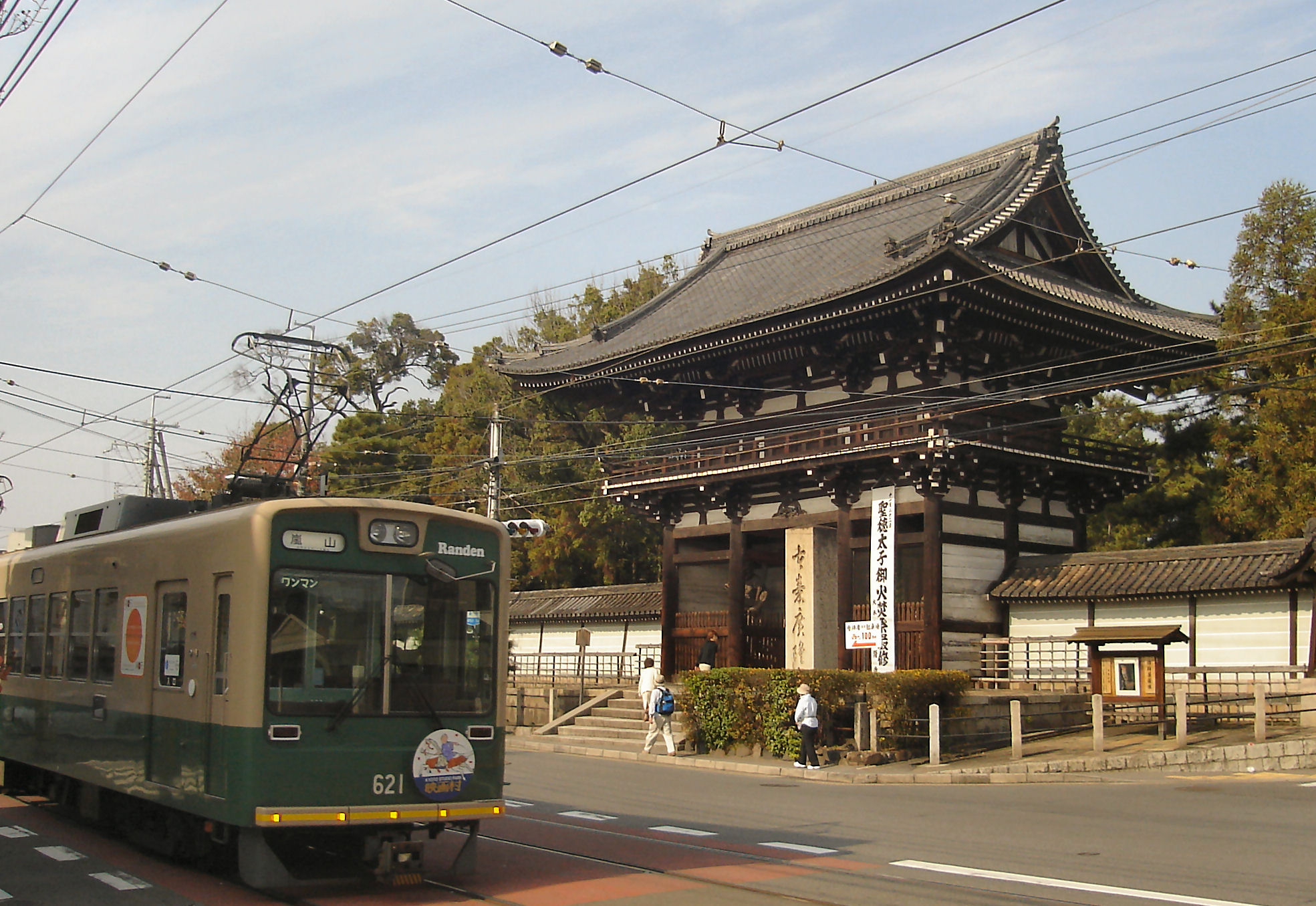
Keifuku Arashiyama Main Line

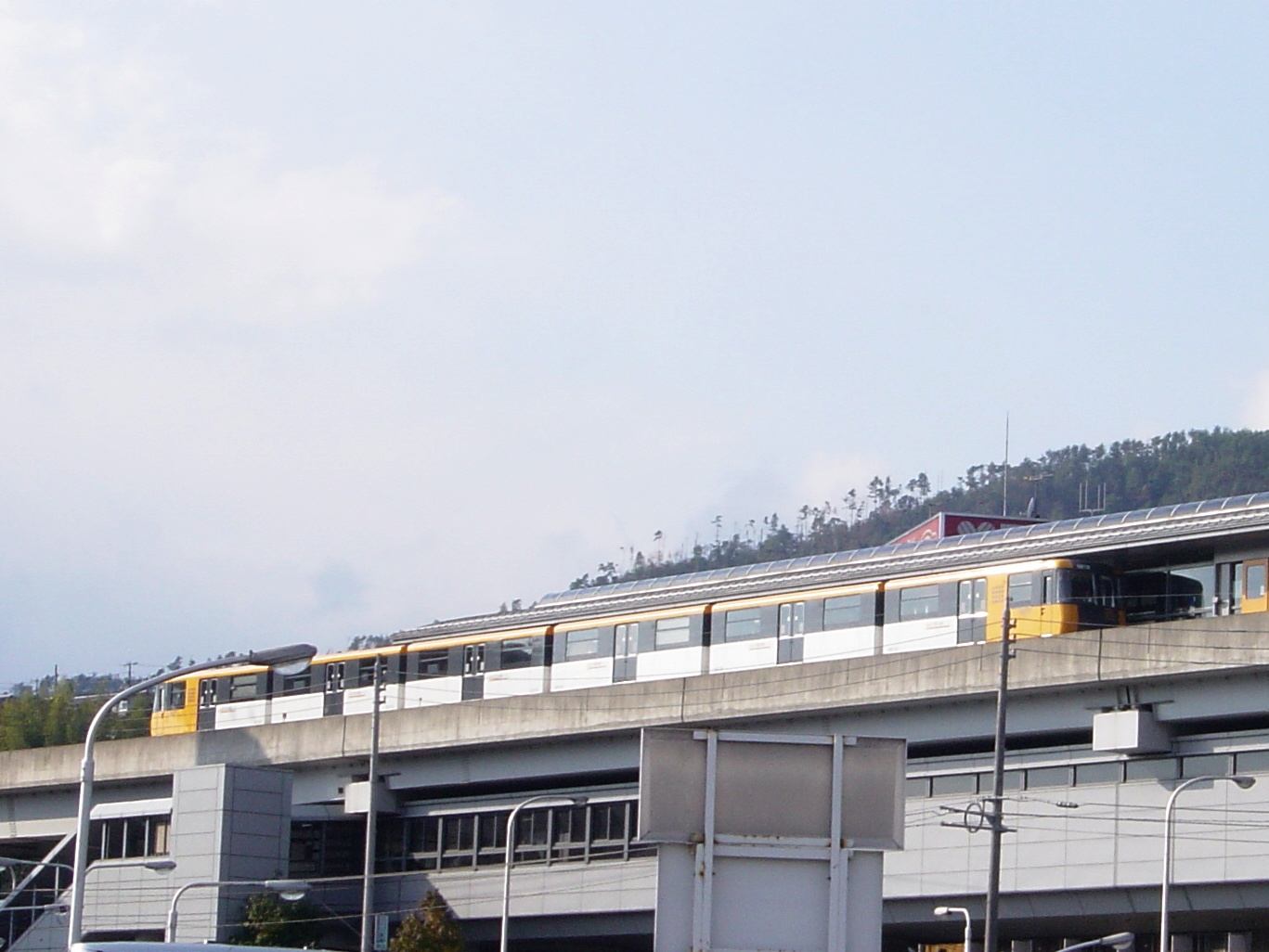
Hiroshima Rapid Transit Astram Line

- Abiko Branch Line (Common name. East Japan Railway Company)
- Aboshi Line (Sanyo Electric Railway)
- Abukuma Express Line (AbukumaExpress)
- Agatsuma Line (East Japan Railway Company)
- Aichi Loop Line (Aichi Loop Line Company)
- Airport Line (Fukuoka City Transportation Bureau)
- Airport Line (Keihin Electric Express Railway)
- Airport Line (Translated nickname. Kyushu Railway Company)
- Airport Line (Nagoya Railroad)
- Airport Line (Nankai Electric Railway)
- Aizu Kinugawa Line (Yagan Railway)
- Aizu Line (Aizu Railway)
- Akabane Line (East Japan Railway Company)
- Akasaki Line (Freight. Iwate Kaihatsu Railway)
- Akasako Line (Nagasaki Electric Tramway)
- Akechi Line (Akechi Railroad)
- Akita Nairiku Line (Akita Nairiku Jukan Railway)
- Akita Rinkai Railway Line (Freight. Akita Rinkai Railway)
- Akita Shinkansen (Nickname. East Japan Railway Company)
- Akō Line (West Japan Railway Company)
- Amagi Line (Amagi Railway)
- Amagi Line (Nishi-Nippon Railroad)
- Amanohashidate Cable Car (Common name. Tango Kairiku Kotsu)
- Ao Line (Kobe Electric Railway)
- Aoimori Railway Line (Aoimori Railway Company)
- Aonami Line (Nickname. Nagoya Seaside Rapid Railway)
- Arakawa Line (Tokyo Metropolitan Bureau of Transportation)
- Arashiyama Line (Hankyu Corporation)
- Arashiyama Main Line (Keifuku Electric Railroad)
- Arima Line (Kobe Electric Railway)
- Asa Line (Tosa Kuroshio Railway)
- Asakusa Line (Tokyo Metropolitan Bureau of Transportation)
- Asanogawa Line (Hokuriku Railway)
- Asatō Line (Asa Kaigan Railway)
- Aso Kōgen Line (Nickname. Kyushu Railway Company)
- Astram Line (Nickname. Hiroshima Rapid Transit)
- Aterazawa Line (East Japan Railway Company)
- Atsugi Line (Freight. Sagami Railway)
- Atsumi Line (Toyohashi Railroad)
- Awa Muroto Seaside Line (Nickname. Shikoku Railway Company)
- Azumada Main Line (Toyohashi Railroad)

== B ==
- Ban'etsu-Sai Line (East Japan Railway Company)
- Ban'etsu-To Line (East Japan Railway Company)
- Bantan Line (West Japan Railway Company)
- Beppu Rakutenchi Cable Line (Okamoto MFG)
- Bessho Line (Ueda Electric Railway)
- Bisai Line (Nagoya Railroad)
- Biwako Line (Nickname. West Japan Railway Company)
- Blue Line (Nickname. Yokohama City Transportation Bureau)
- Branch Line (Toyama Chiho Railway)

== C ==
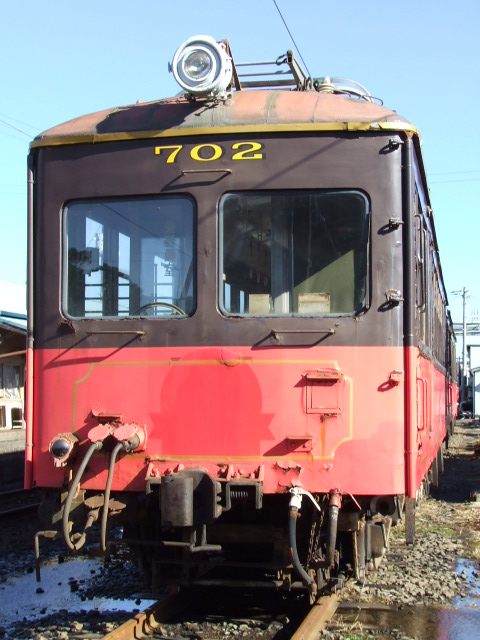
Chōshi Electric Railway Line

- Cable Line (Kurobe Cable Car) (Tateyama Kurobe Kanko)
- Cable Line (Tateyama Cable Car) (Tateyama Kurobe Kanko)
- Cable Line (Hakone Tozan Railway)
- Cable Line (Keifuku Electric Railroad)
- Cable Line (Keihan Electric Railway)
- Cable Line (Nankai Electric Railway)
- Cable Line (Nose Electric Railway)
- Chiba Line (Keisei Electric Railway)
- Seibu Chichibu Line (Seibu Railway)
- Chichibu Main Line (Chichibu Railway)
- Chidori Line (Freight. Kanagawa Rinkai Railway)
- Chihara Line (Keisei Electric Railway)
- Chikkō Line (Nagoya Railroad)
- Chikkō Line (Common name. Takamatsu-Kotohira Electric Railroad)
- Chikuhi Line (Kyushu Railway Company)
- Chikuhō Electric Railroad Line (Common name. Chikuho Electric Railroad)
- Chikuhō Main Line (Kyushu Railway Company)
- Chita New Line (Nagoya Railroad)
- Chitose Line (Hokkaido Railway Company)
- Chiyoda Line (Tokyo Metro)
- Chizu Line (Chizu Express)
- Chōkai Sanroku Line (Yuri Kogen Railway)
- Chōshi Electric Railway Line (Choshi Electric Railway)
- Chūō Line (Osaka Municipal Transportation Bureau)
- Chūō Main Line (East Japan Railway Company, Central Japan Railway Company)
- Chūō-Higashi Line (Common name. East Japan Railway Company)
- Chūō-Nishi Line (Common name. Central Japan Railway Company)
- Chūō-Sōbu Line (Common name. East Japan Railway Company)

== D ==
- Dai-Ikki Line (Kagoshima City Transportation Bureau)
- Dai-Ni-Ki Line (Kagoshima City Transportation Bureau)
- Daishi Line (Keihin Electric Express Railway)
- Daishi Line (Tobu Railway)
- Daiyūzan Line (Izuhakone Railway)
- Dazaifu Line (Nishi-Nippon Railroad)
- Den-en-Toshi Line (Tokyo Kyuko Electric Railway)
- Disney Resort Line (Maihama Resort Line)
- Dōbutsuen Line (Keio Electric Railway)
- Domyoji Line (Kintetsu Railway)
- Dosan Line (Shikoku Railway Company)
- Dragon Rail Ōfunato Line (Nickname, East Japan Railway Company)

== E ==
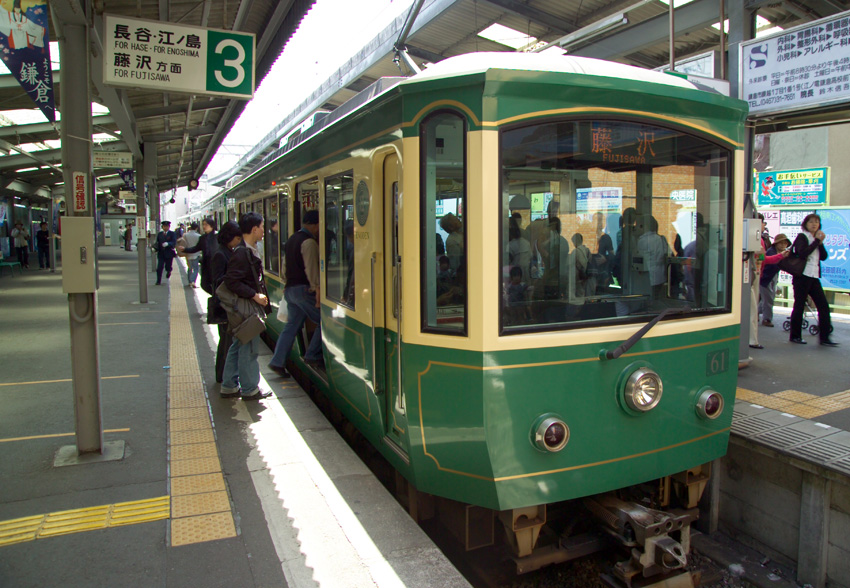
Enoshima Electric Railway Line

- Eba Line (Hiroshima Electric Railway)
- Ebino-Kōgen Line (Nickname. Composed of Hisatsu Line and Kitto Line. Kyushu Railway Company)
- Echigo Line (East Japan Railway Company)
- Eizan Cable (Common name. Keifuku Electric Railroad)
- Eizan Main Line (Eizan Electric Railway)
- Ekimae Line (Common name. Tosaden Kōtsū)
- Ekisan Line (Common name. Tosaden Kōtsū)
- Enoshima Electric Railway Line (Enoshima Electric Railway) No official line name exists.
- Enoshima Line (Odakyu Electric Railway)
- Enoshima Line (Shonan Monorail)
- Enshū Railway Line (Enshū Railway)
- Esashi Line (Hokkaido Railway Company)
- Etsumi-Hoku Line (West Japan Railway Company)
- Etsumi-Nan Line (Nagaragawa Railway)

== F ==
- Flower Nagai Line (Yamagata Railway)
- Fruits Line Aterazawa Line (Nickname. East Japan Railway Company)
- Fuji Kyūkō Line (Common name. Fuji Kyuko)
- Fujikoshi Line (Toyama Chiho Railway)
- Fujisaki Line (Kumamoto Electric Railway)
- Fukubu Line (Fukui Railway)
- Fukuchiyama Line (West Japan Railway Company)
- Fukuen Line (West Japan Railway Company)
- Fukuhoku Yutaka Line (Nickname. Kyushu Railway Company)
- Fukushima Rinkai Railway Main Line (Freight. Fukushima Rinkai Railway)
- Fukutoshin Line (Tokyo Metro)
- Furano Line (Hokkaido Railway Company)

== G ==
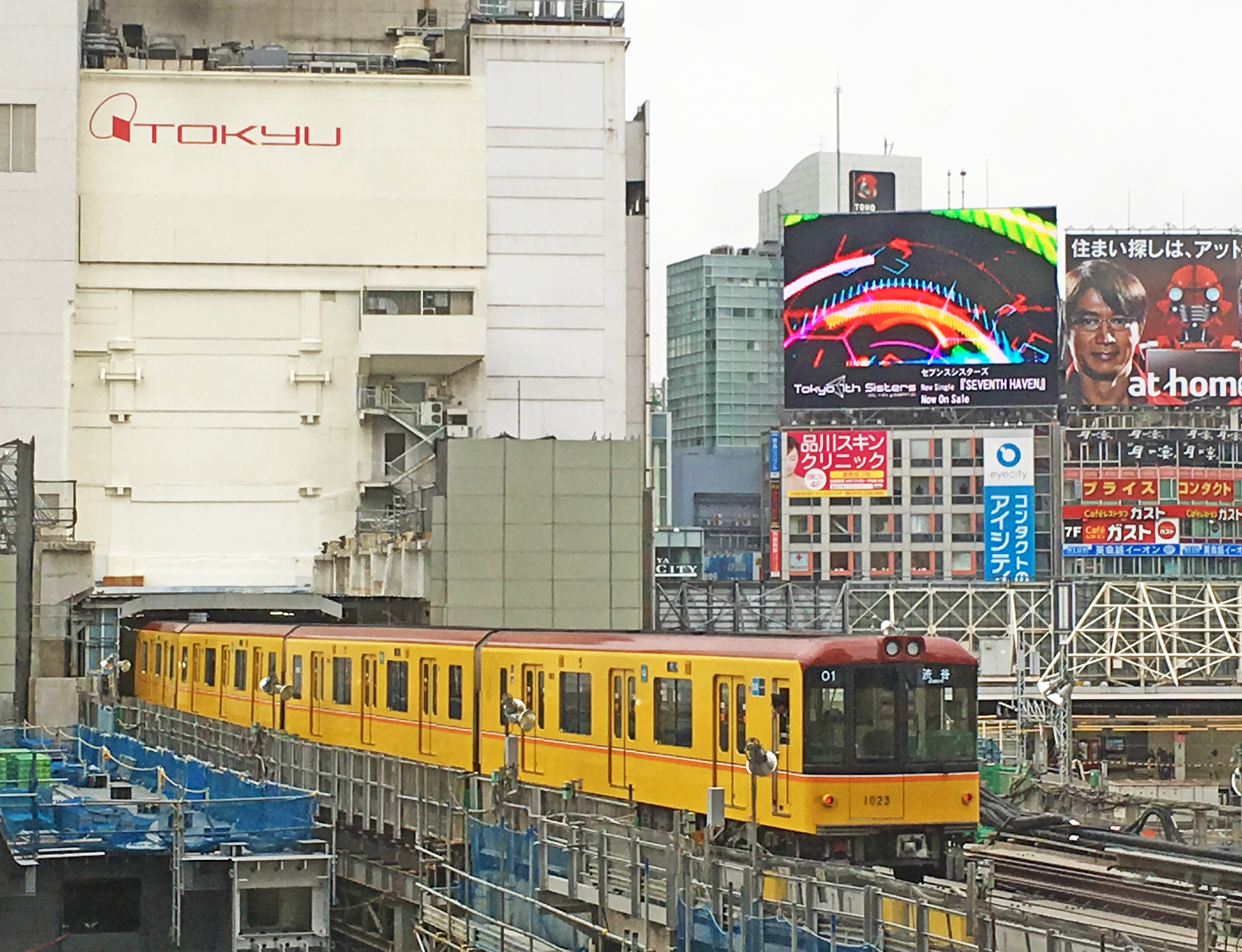
Tokyo Metro Ginza Line

- Gakkentoshi Line (Nickname. West Japan Railway Company)
- Gakuentoshi Line (Nickname. Hokkaido Railway Company)
- Gakunan Railway Line (Gakunan Railway) No official line name exists.
- Gala-Yuzawa Line (Common name. East Japan Railway Company)
- Gamagōri Line (Nagoya Railroad)
- Gantoku Line (West Japan Railway Company)
- Geibi Line (West Japan Railway Company)
- Ginga Dream Line Kamaishi Line (Nickname. East Japan Railway Company)
- Ginza Line (Tokyo Metro)
- Gomen Line (Tosaden Kōtsū)
- Gomen-Nahari Line (Nickname. Tosa Kuroshio Railway)
- Gonō Line (East Japan Railway Company)
- Gose Line (Kintetsu Railway)
- Gotemba Line (Central Japan Railway Company)
- Gotōji Line (Kyushu Railway Company)
- Green Line (Nickname. Yokohama City Transportation Bureau)
- Guideway Bus Shidami Line (Nagoya Guideway Bus)
- Gunchū Line (Iyo Railway)
- Guzū Line (Common name. Tobu Railway)

== H ==
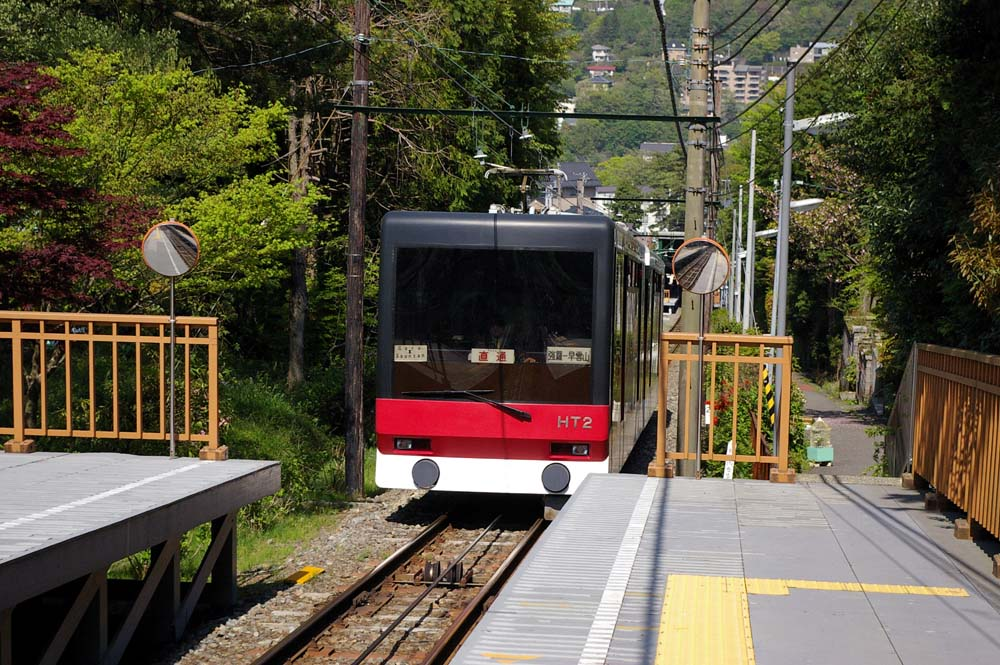
Hakone Tozan Cable Car

- Hachikō Line (East Japan Railway Company)
- Hachinohe Line (East Japan Railway Company)
- Hachinohe Rinkai Railway Line (Freight. Hachinohe Rinkai Railway)
- Hachiōji Line (Kintetsu Railway)
- Hagoromo Branch Line (Common name. West Japan Railway Company)
- Haijima Line (Seibu Railway)
- Hakata-Minami Line (West Japan Railway Company)
- Hakodate Main Line (Hokkaido Railway Company)
- Hakone Jukkokutōge Cable Car (Nickname. Izuhakone Railway)
- Hakone Tozan Cable Car (Nickname. Hakone Tozan Railway)
- Hakone Tozan Line (Common name. Hakone Tozan Railway)
- Hakozaki Line (Fukuoka City Transportation Bureau)
- Hakubi Line (West Japan Railway Company)
- Hakushima Line (Hiroshima Electric Railway)
- Hakushin Line (East Japan Railway Company)
- Hamanasu Bay Line Ōminato Line (Nickname. East Japan Railway Company)
- Hanasaki Line (Nickname. Hokkaido Railway Company)
- Hanawa Line (East Japan Railway Company)
- Hanazono Line (Iyo Railway)
- Handa Line (Kinuura Rinkai Railway)
- Tōkyō Monorail Haneda Line (Tokyo Monorail)
- Hankai Line (Hankai Electric Tramway)
- Hanshin Main Line (Hanshin Electric Railway)
- Hanwa Line (West Japan Railway Company)
- Hanzōmon Line (Tokyo Metro)
- Haruda Line (Nickname. Kyushu Railway Company)
- Hashima Line (Nagoya Railroad)
- Hekinan Line (Kinuura Rinkai Railway)
- Hibiya Line (Tokyo Metro)
- Hidaka Main Line (Hokkaido Railway Company)
- Hieizan Railway Line (Hieizan Railway)
- Higashi-Hagoromo Branch Line (Common name. West Japan Railway Company)
- Higashi-Narita Line (Keisei Electric Railway)
- Higashiyama Line (Common name. Transportation Bureau City of Nagoya)
- Higashiyama Main Line (Okayama Electric Tramway)
- Hijiyama Line (Common name. Hiroshima Electric Railway)
- Hikoroichi Line (Freight. Iwate Kaihatsu Railway)
- Himi Line (West Japan Railway Company)
- Hinkaku Line (Common name. East Japan Railway Company)
- Hiromi Line (Nagoya Railroad)
- Hiroshima New Transit Line 1 (Hiroshima Rapid Transit)
- Hiroshima Short Distance Transit Senō Line (Skyrail Service)
- Hirui Line (Freight. Seino Railway)
- Hisatsu Line (Kyushu Railway Company)
- Hisatsu Orange Railway Line (Hisatsu Orange Railway)
- Hitahikosan Line (Kyushu Railway Company)
- Hobashira Cable Line (Common name. Hobashira Cable)
- Hōhi Main Line (Kyushu Railway Company)
- Hōjō Line (Hojo Railway)
- Hoku Line (North Line) (Freight. Akita Rinkai Railway)
- Hokuhoku Line (Hokuetsu Express)
- Hokuriku Main Line (West Japan Railway Company)
- Hokuriku Shinkansen (East Japan Railway Company)
- Hokusei Line (Sangi Railway)
- Hokushin Line (Hokushin Kyuko Electric Railway(services), Kobe Rapid Railway(tracks))
- Hokusō Line (Hokuso Railway)
- Hommachi Line (Iyo Railway)
- Hommoku Line (Freight. Kanagawa Rinkai Railway)
- Hōnanchō Branch Line (Common name. Tokyo Metro)
- Honshi-Bisan Line (West Japan Railway Company, Shikoku Railway Company)
- Hoppō Freight Line (Common name. West Japan Railway Company)
- Hōrai-Yachigashira Line (Hakodate City Transportation Bureau)
- Hot Spa Line (Nickname. Yagan Railway)
- Hotarujaya Line (Nagasaki Electric Tramway)

== I ==
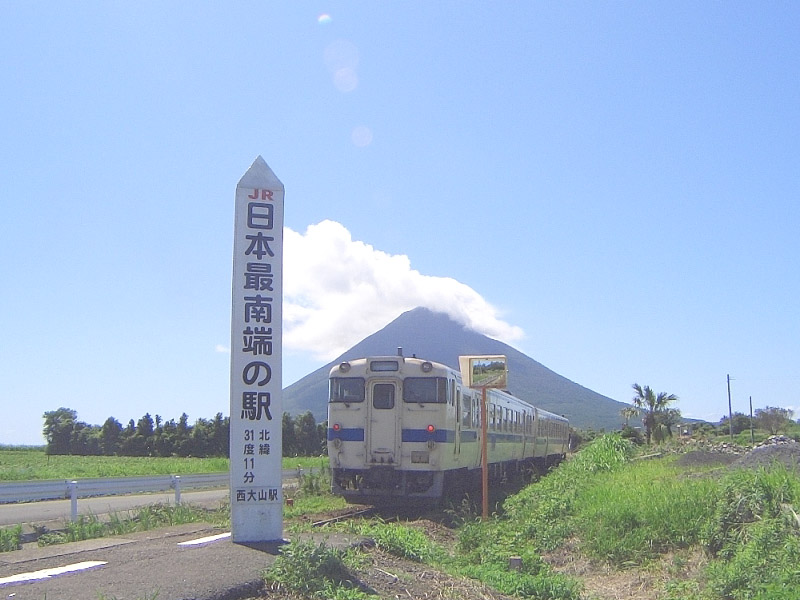
JR Ibusuki Makurazaki Line

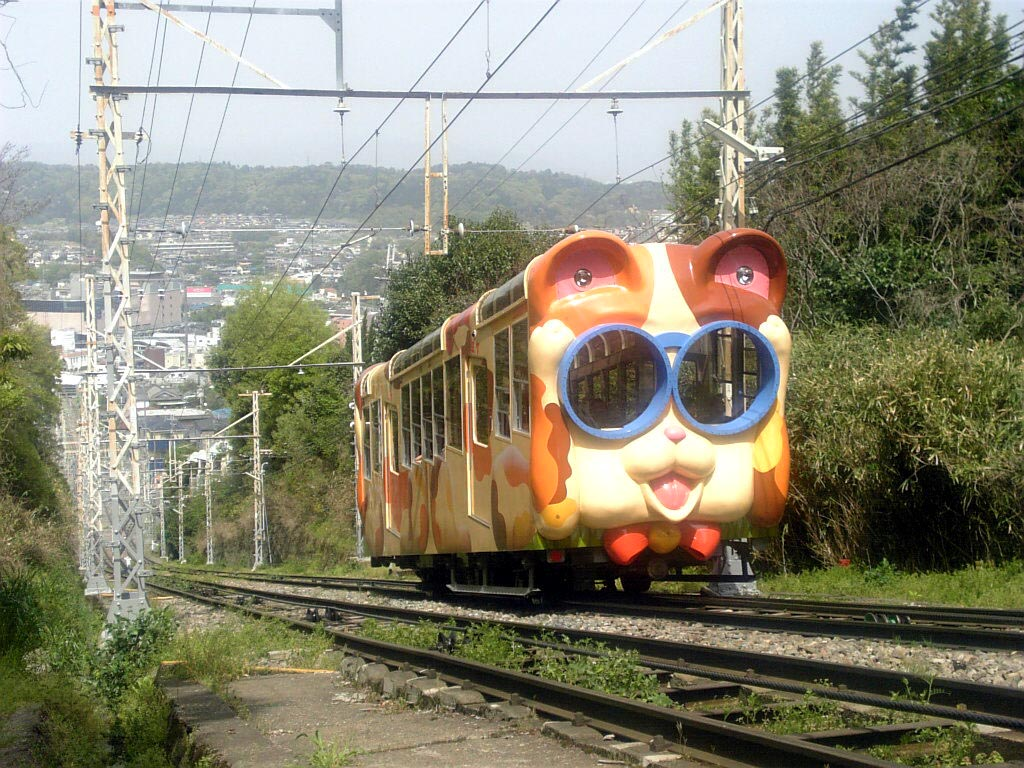
Kintetsu Ikoma Cable Line

- Ibara Line (Ibara Railway)
- Ibi Line (Common name. Kintetsu Railway)
- Ibusuki Makurazaki Line (Kyushu Railway Company)
- Ichihashi Line (Freight. Seino Railway)
- Iga Line (Iga Railway)
- Iida Line (Central Japan Railway Company)
- Iiyama Line (East Japan Railway Company)
- Iizaka Line (Fukushima Transportation)
- Ikawa Line (Oigawa Railway)
- Ikebukuro Line (Seibu Railway)
- Ikegami Line (Tokyo Kyuko Electric Railway)
- Ikoma Cable Line (Kintetsu Railway)
- Ikoma Line (Kintetsu Railway)
- Imazatosuji Line (Osaka Municipal Transportation Bureau)
- Imazu Line (Hankyu Corporation)
- Inbi Line (West Japan Railway Company)
- Ina Line (Saitama New Urban Transit)
- Inō Line (Tosaden Kōtsū)
- Inokashira Line (Keio Electric Railway)
- Inuyama Line (Nagoya Railroad)
- Inuyama Monorail (Common name. Nagoya Railroad)
- Ise Line (Ise Railway)
- Isesaki Line (Tobu Railway)
- Ishikawa Line (Hokuriku Railway)
- Ishinomaki Line (East Japan Railway Company)
- Ishiyama Sakamoto Line (Keihan Electric Railway)
- Isumi Line (Isumi Railway)
- Ita Line (Heisei Chikuho Railway)
- Itami Line (Hankyu Corporation)
- Itō Line (East Japan Railway Company)
- Itoda Line (Heisei Chikuho Railway)
- Itsukaichi Line (East Japan Railway Company)
- Iwaizumi Line (East Japan Railway Company)
- Iwate Galaxy Railway Line (IGR Iwate Galaxy Railway)
- Izu Kyūkō Line (Izukyū Corporation)
- Izumino Line (Sagami Railway)
