= List of railway lines in Japan (J to P) =

List of railway lines in Japan
#, A to I	J to P	R to Z

== J ==
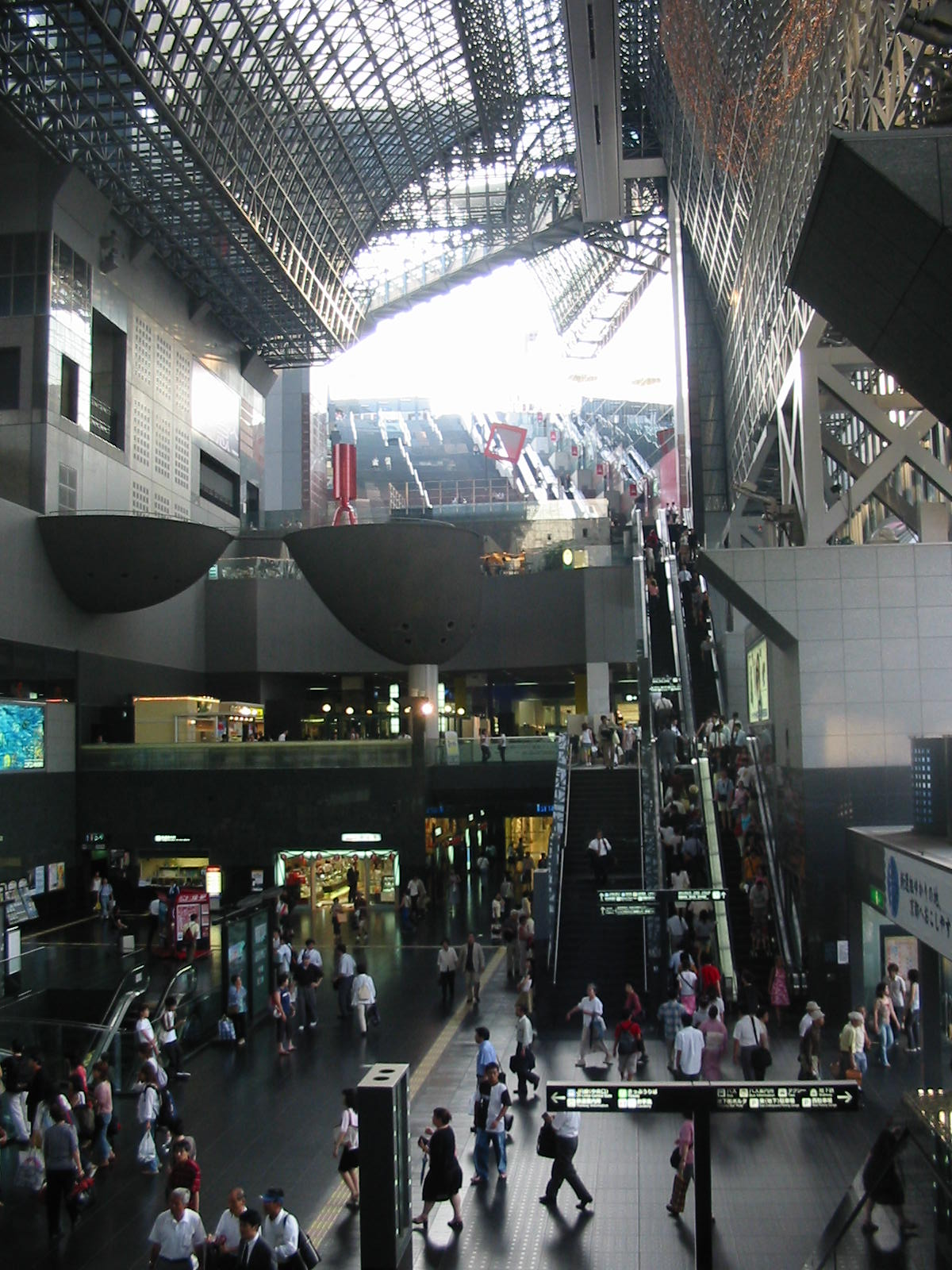
Kyōto Station, serving JR Kyōto Line and others.

- Jikkoku Cable Line (Izuhakone Railway)
- Jimbō Line (Group name. Composed of Kōbe Line and Takarazuka Line. Hankyu Corporation)
- Jōban Line (East Japan Railway Company)
- Jōetsu Line (East Japan Railway Company)
- Jōetsu Shinkansen (East Japan Railway Company)
- Jōhana Line (West Japan Railway Company)
- Jōhoku Line (Central Japan Railway Company (tracks and services), JR-Central Transport Service Company (services))
- Jōhoku Line (Iyo Railway)
- Jōmō Line (Jōmō Electric Railway)
- Jōnan Line (Iyo Railway)
- Jōshin Line (Jōshin Dentetsu)
- Jōsō Line (Kantō Railway)
- JR Kōbe Line (Nickname. West Japan Railway Company)
- JR Kyōto Line (Nickname. West Japan Railway Company)
- JR Takarazuka Line (Nickname. West Japan Railway Company)
- JR Tōzai Line (West Japan Railway Company)
- JR Yumesaki Line (Nickname. West Japan Railway Company)
- Jukkokutōge Cable Car (Common name Izuhakone Railway)

== K ==
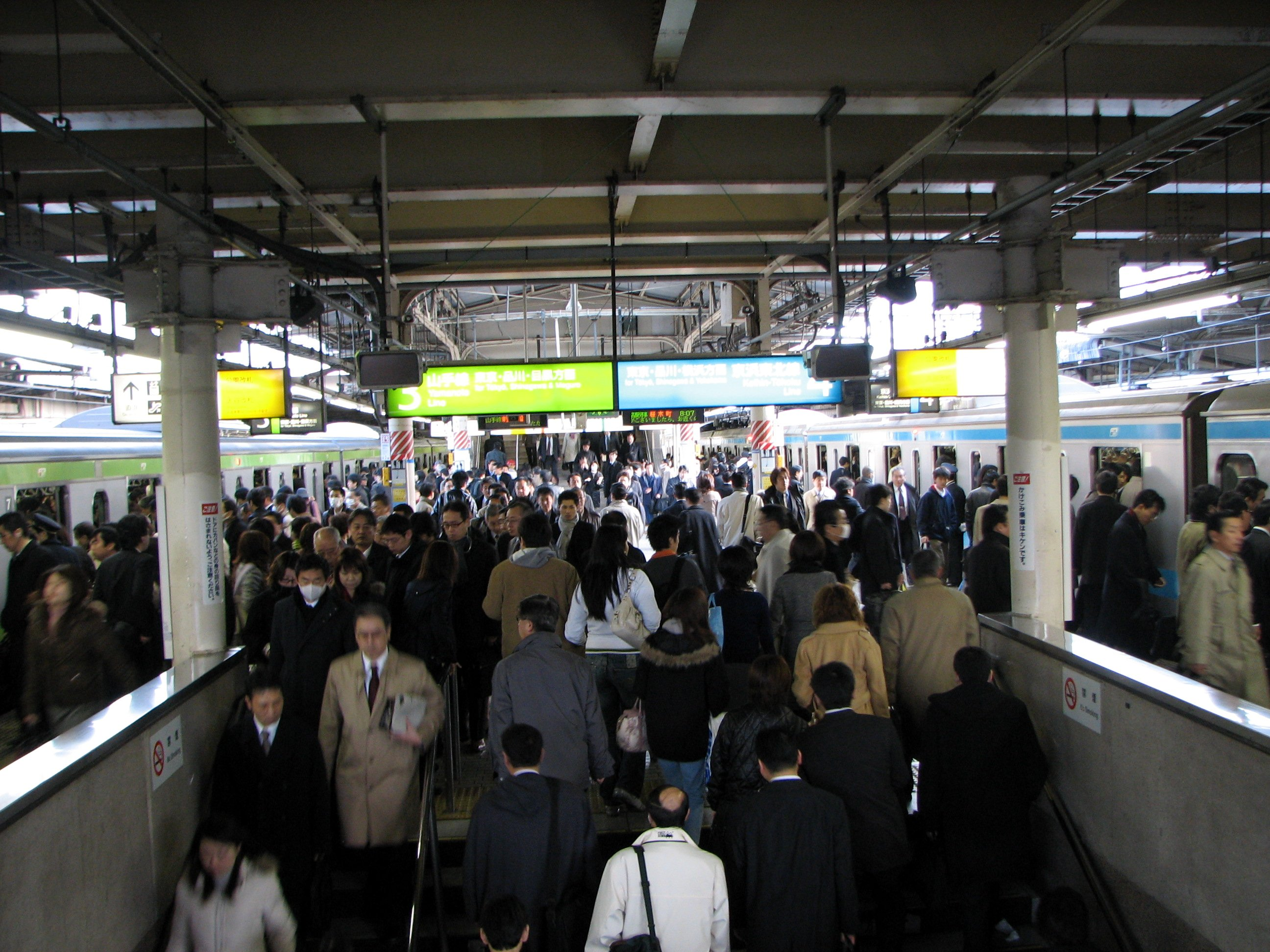
Rush hour at Ueno Station, JR Keihin–Tōhoku Line and JR Yamanote Line.

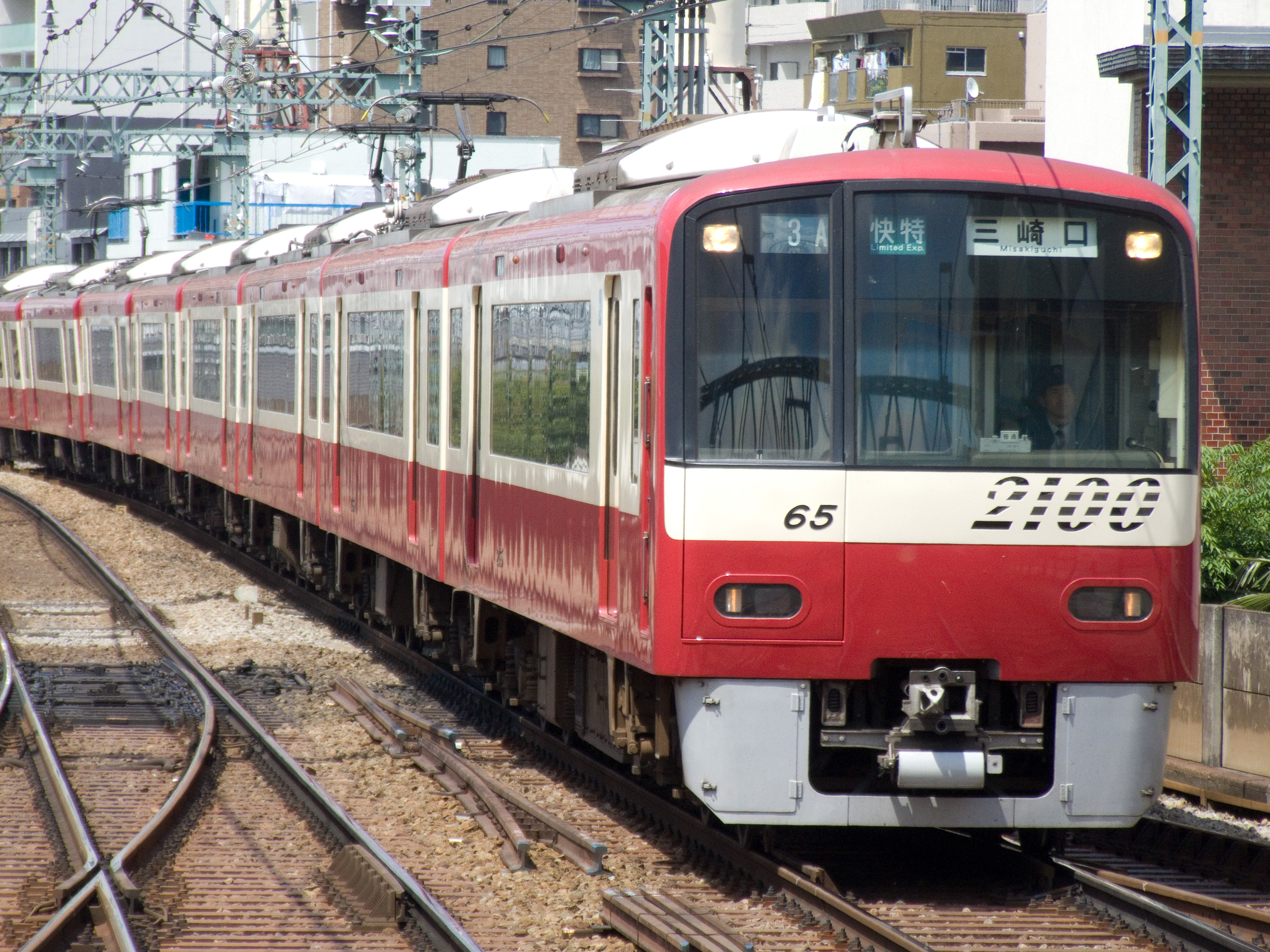
Keikyū Main Line

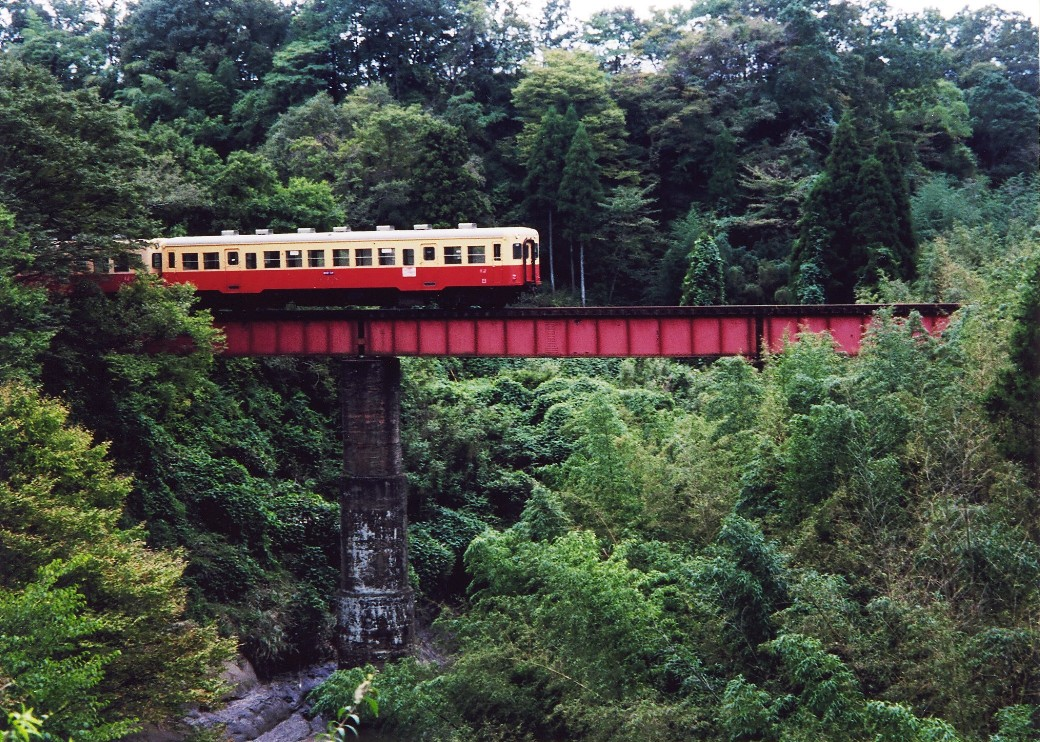
Kominato Railway Line

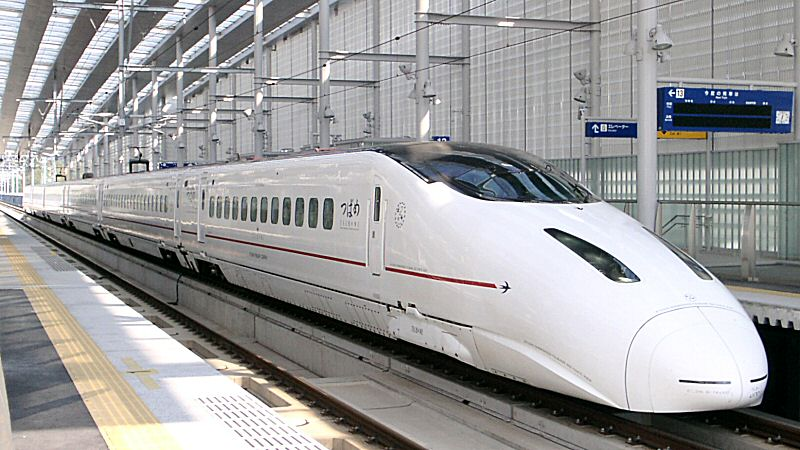
JR Kyushu Shinkansen

- Kabe Line (West Japan Railway Company)
- Kada Line (Nankai Electric Railway)
- Kagoshima Main Line (Kyushu Railway Company)
- Kaigan Line (Kobe Municipal Transportation Bureau)
- Kaikyō Line (Hokkaido Railway Company)
- Kaizuka Line (Nishi-Nippon Railroad)
- Kakamigahara Line (Nagoya Railroad)
- Kakogawa Line (West Japan Railway Company)
- Kamaishi Line (East Japan Railway Company)
- Kameido Line (Tobu Railway)
- Kamidaki Line (Toyama Chiho Railway)
- Kamiiida Line (Common name. Transportation Bureau City of Nagoya)
- Kamikōchi Line (Alpico Kōtsū)
- Kamikumamoto Line (Kumamoto City Transportation Bureau)
- Kanagawa Eastern Line (Sagami Railway, Tokyo Kyuko Electric Railway)
- Kanamachi Line (Keisei Electric Railway)
- Kanazawa Seaside Line (Yokohama New Transit)
- Kanden Tunnel Trolleybus (Common name. Kansai Electric Power Company)
- Kansai Airport Line (Translation. West Japan Railway Company)
- Kansai Kūkō Line (West Japan Railway Company)
- Kansai Main Line (Central Japan Railway Company, West Japan Railway Company)
- Karasuma Line (Kyoto Municipal Transportation Bureau)
- Karasuyama Line (East Japan Railway Company)
- Karatsu Line (Kyushu Railway Company)
- Kasamatsu Cable (Common name. Tango Kairiku Kotsu)
- Kashihara Line (Kintetsu Railway)
- Kashii Line (Kyushu Railway Company)
- Kashima Line (East Japan Railway Company)
- Kashima Railway Line (Kashima Railway) Closed
- Kashima Rinkō Line (Kashima Rinkai Railway)
- Katamachi Line (West Japan Railway Company)
- Katano Line (Keihan Electric Railway)
- Katsuyama Eiheiji Line (Echizen Railway)
- Kawagoe Line (East Japan Railway Company)
- Kawaguchiko Line (Fuji Kyuko)
- Kawasaki Longitudinal Rapid Railway (Kawasaki City Transportation Bureau) Planned
- Kawasaki Municipal Subway (Common name. Kawasaki City Transportation Bureau) Planned
- Keihan Main Line (Keihan Electric Railway)
- Keihanna Line (Kintetsu Railway)
- Keihin–Tōhoku Line (Common name. East Japan Railway Company)
- Keikyū Main Line (Common name. Keihin Electric Express Railway)
- Keikyū Zushi Line (Common name. Keihin Electric Express Railway)
- Keiō Line (Keio Electric Railway)
- Keiō New Line (Common name. Keio Electric Railway)
- Keisei Main Line (Common name. Keisei Electric Railway)
- Keishin Line (Keihan Electric Railway)
- Keiyō Line (East Japan Railway Company)
- Kengun Line (Kumamoto City Transportation Bureau)
- Kesennuma Line (East Japan Railway Company)
- Kibi Line (West Japan Railway Company)
- Kikuchi Line (Kumamoto Electric Railway)
- Kinokuni Line (Nickname. West Japan Railway Company)
- Kintetsu Link Line (Sangi Railway)
- Kinugawa Line (Tobu Railway)
- Kiryū Line (Tobu Railway)
- Kisei Main Line (Central Japan Railway Company, West Japan Railway Company)
- Kishigawa Line (Wakayama Electric Railway)
- Kishin Line (West Japan Railway Company)
- Kishū Railway Line (Kishu Railway)
- Kisuki Line (West Japan Railway Company)
- Kita-Alps Line (Nickname. East Japan Railway Company, West Japan Railway Company)
- Kita-Ayase Branch Line (Common name. Tokyo Metro)
- Kita-Matsue Line (Ichibata Electric Railway)
- Kitame Line (Common name. Shimabara Railway)
- Kitakami Line (East Japan Railway Company)
- Kitano Line (Keifuku Electric Railroad)
- Kitaōji Line (Common name. Freight. Japan Freight Railway Company)
- Kita-Riasu Line (Sanriku Railway)
- Kitto Line (Kyushu Railway Company)
- JR Kōbe Line (Nickname. West Japan Railway Company)
- Kōbe Main Line (Hankyu Corporation)
- Kodomonokuni Line (Yokohama Minatomirai Railway Company (services), Tokyo Kyuko Electric Railway (tracks))
- Kōen-Toshi Line (Kobe Electric Railway)
- Koizumi Line (Tobu Railway)
- Kokubunji Line (Seibu Railway)
- Kokura Line (Kitakyushu Urban Monorail)
- Kokusai Bunka Kōen Toshi Line (Osaka Rapid Railway)
- Komaki Line (Nagoya Railroad)
- Kominato Railway Line (Kominato Railway)
- Kōnan Line (Kōnan Railway Company)
- Kosaka Line (Freight. Kosaka Smelting & Refining)
- Kosaka Railway Kosaka Line (Freight. Common name. Kosaka Smelting & Refining)
- Kosei Line (West Japan Railway Company)
- Kōtō Line (Freight. Mizushima Rinkai Railway)
- Kotohira Line (Takamatsu-Kotohira Electric Railroad)
- Kōtoku Line (Shikoku Railway Company)
- Koumi Line (East Japan Railway Company)
- Kōwa Line (Nagoya Railroad)
- Kōya Line (Nankai Electric Railway)
- Kōyō Line (Hankyu Corporation)
- Kūkō Line (Keihin Electric Express Railway)
- Kūkō Line (Nickname. Kyushu Railway Company)
- Kūkō Line (Nagoya Railroad)
- Kūkō Line (Nankai Electric Railway)
- Kurama Line (Eizan Electric Railway)
- Kuramayama Cable Car (Kurama-dera Temple)
- Kure Line (West Japan Railway Company)
- Kureha Line (Toyama Chiho Railway)
- Kurihama Line (Keihin Electric Express Railway)
- Kurihara Den'en Railway Line (Kurihara Den'en Railway) Closed
- Kurobe Cable Car (Common name. Tateyama Kurobe Kanko)
- Kurobe Gorge Railway Main Line (Common name. Kurobe Gorge Railway)
- Kururi Line (East Japan Railway Company)
- Kusatsu Line (West Japan Railway Company)
- Kuzuryū Line (Nickname. West Japan Railway Company)
- Kyoto Line (Kintetsu Railway)
- JR Kyōto Line (Nickname. West Japan Railway Company)
- Kyōto Main Line (Hankyu Corporation)
- Kyūdai Main Line (Kyushu Railway Company)
- Kyushu Shinkansen (Kyushu Railway Company)

== L ==
Lines just with numbers, such as "Line 1", are listed separately.

- Linimo (Nickname. Aichi Rapid Transit)

== M ==
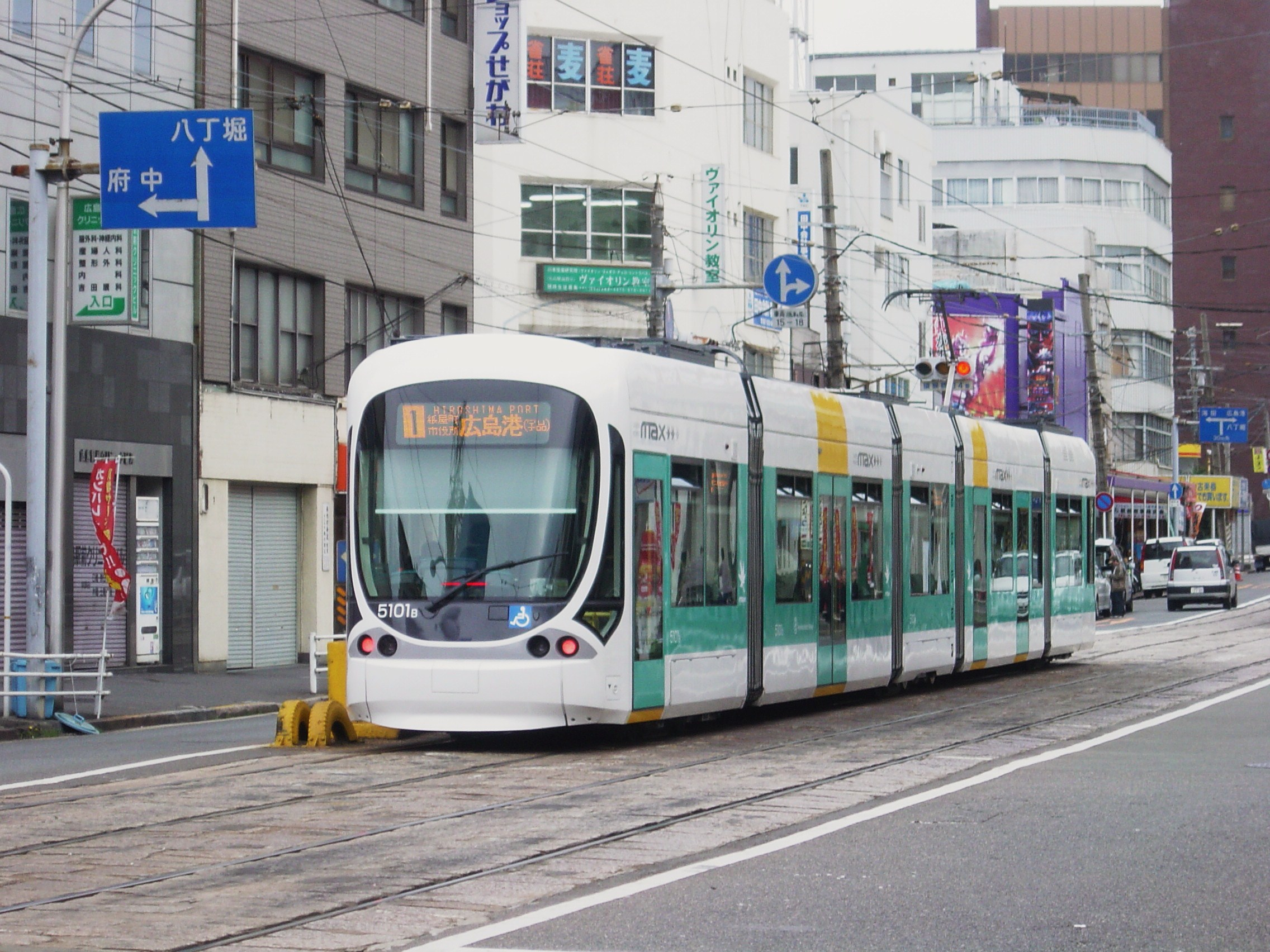
Hiroden Main Line

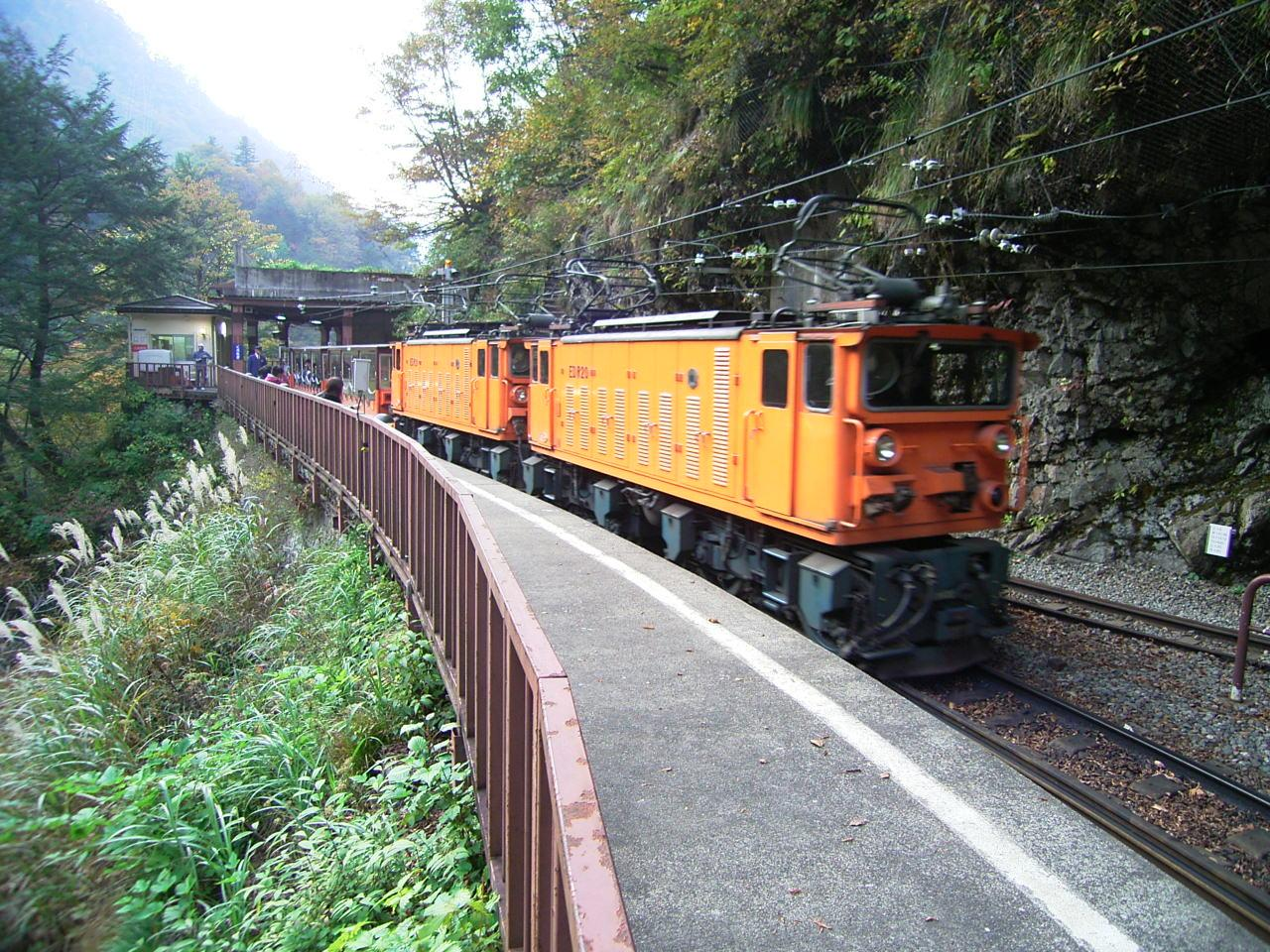
Kurobe Gorge Railway Main Line

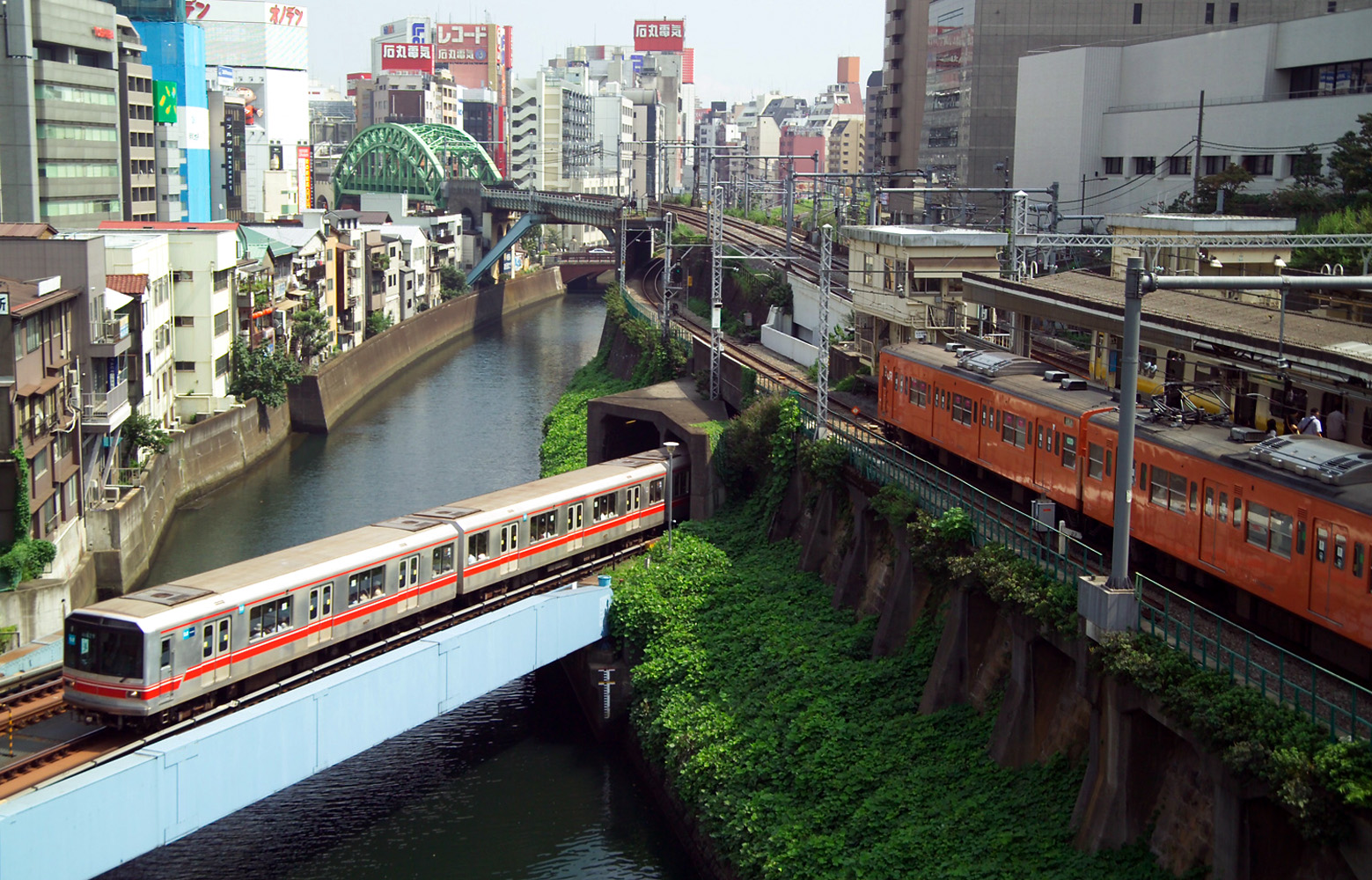
Tokyo Metro Marunouchi Line, crossing JR Chūō Main Line.

- Main Line (Hakodate City Transportation Bureau)
- Main Line (Hanshin Electric Railway)
- Main Line (Hiroshima Electric Railway)
- Main Line (Keihin Electric Express Railway)
- Main Line (Keisei Electric Railway)
- Main Line (Kurobe Gorge Railway)
- Main Line (Nagasaki Electric Tramway)
- Main Line (Ohmi Railway)
- Main Line (Sagami Railway)
- Main Line (Sanyo Electric Railway)
- Main Line (Toyama Chiho Railway) (Railway)
- Main Line (Toyama Chiho Railway) (Tramway)
- Maizuru Line (West Japan Railway Company)
- Man'yō Line (Nickname. Man'yo Line)
- Marunouchi Branch Line (Tokyo Metro)
- Marunouchi Line (Tokyo Metro)
- Maya Cable Line (Kobe City Urban Development)
- Meguro Line (Tokyo Kyuko Electric Railway)
- Meijō Line (Common name. Transportation Bureau City of Nagoya)
- Meikō Line (Common name. Transportation Bureau City of Nagoya)
- Meishō Line (Central Japan Railway Company)
- Metro Seven (Operator undecided) Planned
- Midōsuji Line (Osaka Municipal Transportation Bureau)
- Mikajiri Line (Freight. Chichibu Railway)
- Mikawa Line (Nagoya Railroad)
- Miki Line (Miki Rail-Bus)
- Mikuni Awara Line (Echizen Railway)
- Minami Line (Hiroshima Electric Railway)
- Minami-Alpes Abt Line (Nickname. Oigawa Railway)
- Minamime Line (Common name. Shimabara Railway)
- Minami Osaka Line (Kintetsu Railway)
- Minami-Riasu Line (Sanriku Railway)
- Minato Line (Hitachinaka Kaihin Railway)
- Minatomirai 21 Line (Yokohama Minatomirai Railway Company)
- Minatomirai Line (Common name. Yokohama Minatomirai Railway Company)
- Mine Line (West Japan Railway Company)
- Minobu Line (Central Japan Railway Company)
- Minoo Line (Hankyu Corporation)
- Misumi Line (Kyushu Railway Company)
- Mita Line (Tokyo Metropolitan Bureau of Transportation)
- Mitake Tozan Cable (Common name. Mitake Tozan Railway)
- Mito Line (East Japan Railway Company)
- Miyafuku Line (Kyoto Tango Railway)
- Miyajidake Line (Former name. Nishi-Nippon Railroad)
- Miyajima Line (Hiroshima Electric Railway)
- Miyazaki Kūkō Line (Kyushu Railway Company)
- Miyazu Line (Kyoto Tango Railway)
- Mizue Line (Freight. Kanagawa Rinkai Railway)
- Mizuma Line (Mizuma Railway)
- Mizushima Main Line (Mizushima Rinkai Railway)
- Monkey Park Monorail Line (Nagoya Railroad)
- Mooka Line (Mooka Railway)
- Mori to Mizu to Roman no Tetsudō (The Railway of Forest, Water and Romance) (Nickname. East Japan Railway Company)
- Motoyama Branch Line (Common name. West Japan Railway Company)
- Mt. Tsukuba Cable Car Line (Tsukuba Kanko Railway)
- Mugi Line (Shikoku Railway Company)
- Mukogawa Line (Hanshin Electric Railway)
- Muroran Main Line (Hokkaido Railway Company)
- Musashino Line (East Japan Railway Company)
- Myōken Cable (Common name. Nose Electric Railway)
- Myōken Line (Nose Electric Railway)

== N ==
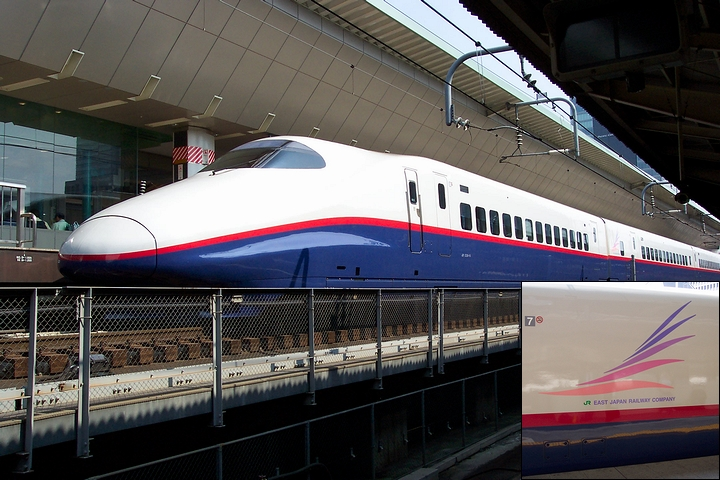
JR Nagano Shinkansen

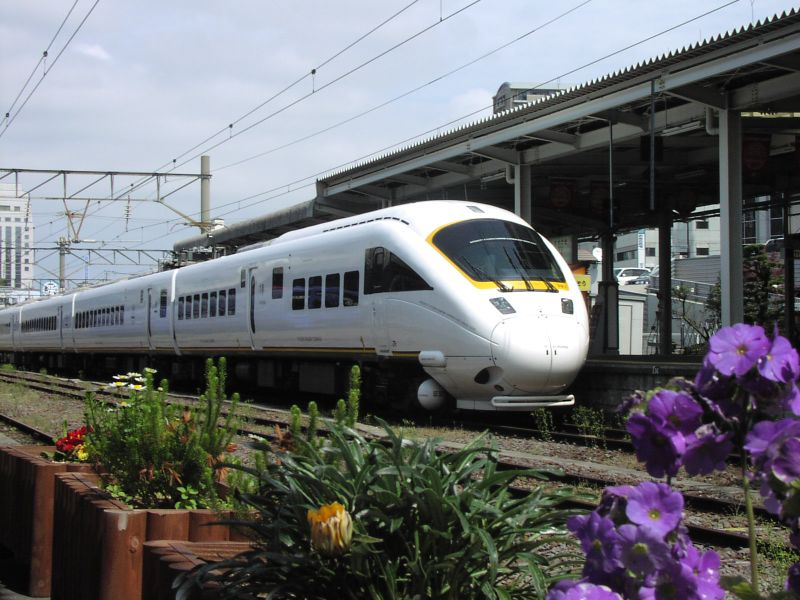
JR Nagasaki Main Line

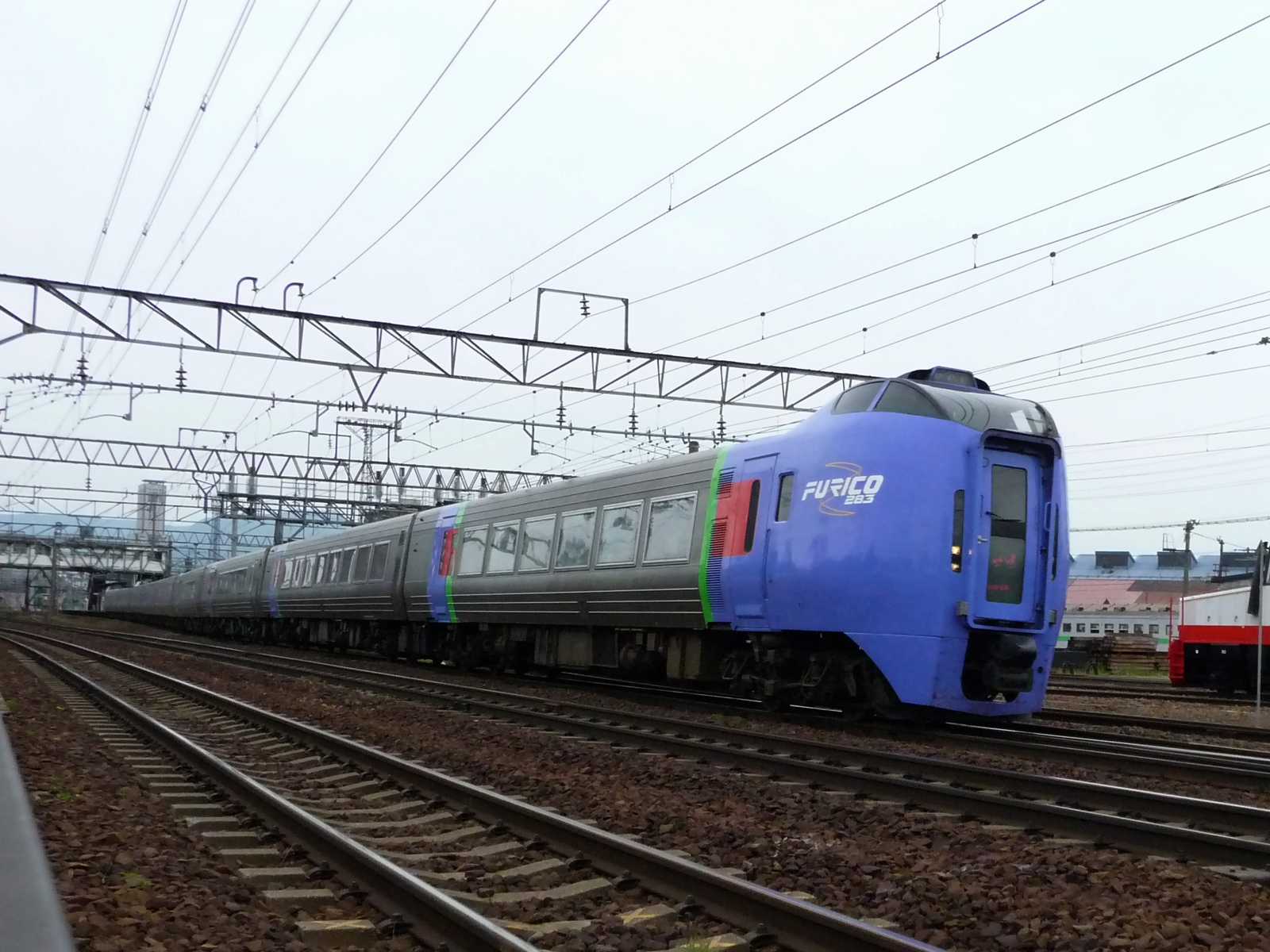
JR Nemuro Main Line

- Nagahori Tsurumi-Ryokuchi Line (Osaka Municipal Transportation Bureau)
- Nagano Line (Kintetsu Railway)
- Nagano Line (Nagano Electric Railway)
- Nagano Shinkansen (Nickname. East Japan Railway Company)
- Nagao Line (Takamatsu-Kotohira Electric Railroad)
- Nagareyama Line (Ryutetsu)
- Nagasaki Main Line (Kyushu Railway Company)
- Nagoya Line (Kintetsu Railway)
- Nagoya Main Line (Nagoya Railroad)
- Nakamura Line (Tosa Kuroshio Railway)
- Nakanoshima Line (Keihan Electric Railway) Under construction
- Namba Line (Kintetsu Railway)
- Namboku Line (Kobe Rapid Railway (services) )
- Namboku Line (Sapporo City Transportation Bureau)
- Namboku Line (Sendai City Transportation Bureau)
- Namboku Line (Tokyo Metro)
- Nambu Line (East Japan Railway Company)
- Nambu Branch Line (Common name. East Japan Railway Company)
- Nan Line (South Line) (Freight. Akita Rinkai Railway)
- Nanakuma Line (Fukuoka City Transportation Bureau)
- Nanao Line (Noto Railway)
- Nanao Line (West Japan Railway Company)
- Naniwasuji Line (Operator undecided) Planned
- Nankai Main Line (Nankai Electric Railway)
- Nankō Line (Freight. Nagoya Rinkai Railway)
- Nankō Port Town Line (Osaka Municipal Transportation Bureau)
- Nankō-Minato-Ku Link Line (New Tram Technoport Line) (Osaka Municipal Transportation Bureau)
- Nankō-Minato-Ku Link Line (Technoport Line) (Osaka Municipal Transportation Bureau)
- Nara Line (Kintetsu Railway)
- Nara Line (West Japan Railway Company)
- Narita Line (East Japan Railway Company)
- Narita New Rapid Railway Line (Keisei Electric Railway (services), Narita Rapid Rail Access (tracks))
- Naruto Line (Shikoku Railway Company)
- Negishi Line (East Japan Railway Company)
- Nemuro Main Line (Hokkaido Railway Company)
- New Shuttle (Nickname. Saitama New Urban Transit)
- Nichinan Line (Kyushu Railway Company)
- Nihonkai Jūkan Line (Group name. Composed of JR lines running on the Sea of Japan coast. East Japan Railway Company, West Japan Railway Company)
- Nikkō Line (East Japan Railway Company)
- Nikkō Line (Tobu Railway)
- Nippō Main Line (Kyushu Railway Company)
- Nippori-Toneri Liner (Tokyo Metropolitan Subway Construction Company (constructor), operated by TOEI.)
- Nishi-Futō Line (Freight. Mizushima Rinkai Railway)
- Nishihino Line (Common name. Kintetsu Railway)
- Nishikajima Line (Common name. Enshu Railway)
- Nishikigawa Seiryū Line (Nishikigawa Railway)
- Nishi-Kyūshū Line (Matsuura Railway)
- Nishi-Nagoyakō Line (Nagoya Seaside Rapid Railway)
- Nishio Line (Nagoya Railroad)
- Nishi-Ōsaka Line (Hanshin Electric Railway)
- Nishi-Shigi Cable Line (Kintetsu Railway)
- Nissei Line (Nose Electric Railway)
- Noda Line (Tobu Railway)
- North Line (Translation. Freight. Akita Rinkai Railway)

== O ==
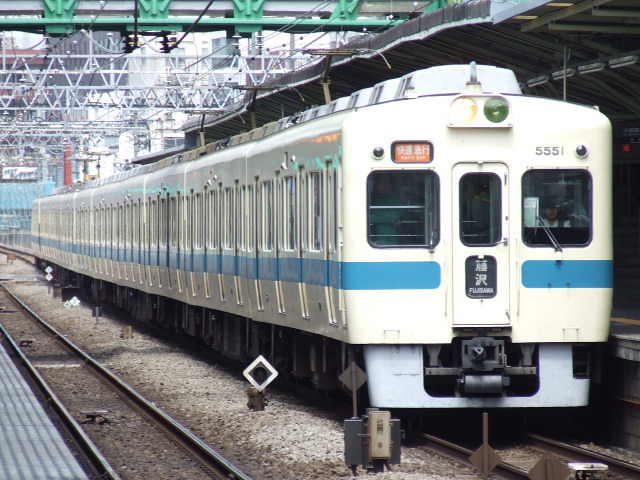
Odakyū Odawara Line

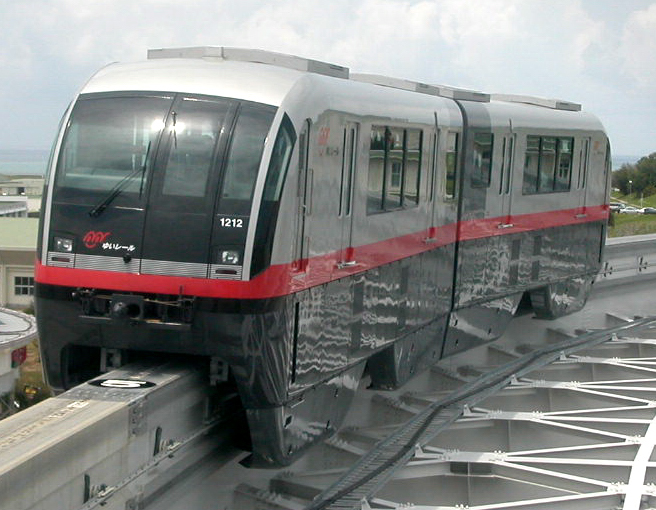
Okinawa Urban Monorail (Yui Rail)

- Ōarai Kashima Line (Kashima Rinkai Railway)
- Obama Line (West Japan Railway Company)
- Odawara Line (Odakyu Electric Railway)
- Ōedo Line (Tokyo Metropolitan Bureau of Transportation)
- Ōfunato Line (East Japan Railway Company)
- Oga Line (East Japan Railway Company)
- Oga Namahage Line (Nickname. East Japan Railway Company)
- Ogose Line (Tōbu Railway)
- Ōigawa Main Line (Oigawa Railway)
- Ōimachi Line (Tokyo Kyuko Electric Railway)
- Ōito Line (East Japan Railway Company, West Japan Railway Company)
- Ōkawa Branch Line (Common name. East Japan Railway Company)
- Okinawa Urban Monorail Line (Okinawa Urban Monorail)
- Oku-no-Hosomichi Mogamigawa Line (Nickname. East Japan Railway Company)
- Oku-no-Hosomichi Yukemuri Line (Nickname. East Japan Railway Company)
- Ōminato Line (East Japan Railway Company)
- Ōmiya Line (Common name. Tobu Railway)
- Ōmori Line (Hakodate City Transportation Bureau)
- Ōmura Line (Kyushu Railway Company)
- Onoda Line (West Japan Railway Company)
- Osaka Line (Kintetsu Railway)
- Ōsaka Higashi Line (West Japan Railway Company)
- Ōsaka Loop Line (West Japan Railway Company)
- Ōsaka Monorail Line (Osaka Rapid Railway)
- Oshiage Line (Keisei Electric Railway)
- Ōta Line (Common name. Tobu Railway)
- Ōtemachi Line (Iyo Railway)
- Ōtō Line (Keihan Electric Railway)
- Otokoyama Cable (Common name. Keihan Electric Railway)
- Ōtsu Line (Group name. Composed of Keishin Line and Ishiyama Sakamoto Line. Keihan Electric Railway)
- Ōtsuki Line (Fuji Kyuko)
- Ōu Main Line (East Japan Railway Company)
- Oume Line (East Japan Railway Company)
- Ōura Line (Nagasaki Electric Tramway)
- Ōwani Line (Konan Railway)
- Ōyama Cable Line (Oyama Kanko Electric Railway)

== P ==
- Peach Liner (Nickname. Tokadai New Transit) Closed
- Phase 1 Line (Translation. Kagoshima City Transportation Bureau)
- Phase 2 Line (Translation. Kagoshima City Transportation Bureau)
- Port Island Line (Kobe New Transit)
