= Keifuku Cable Line =

Funicular line in Kyōto, Japan

Coordinates: 35°3′54.4″N 135°48′56.2″E

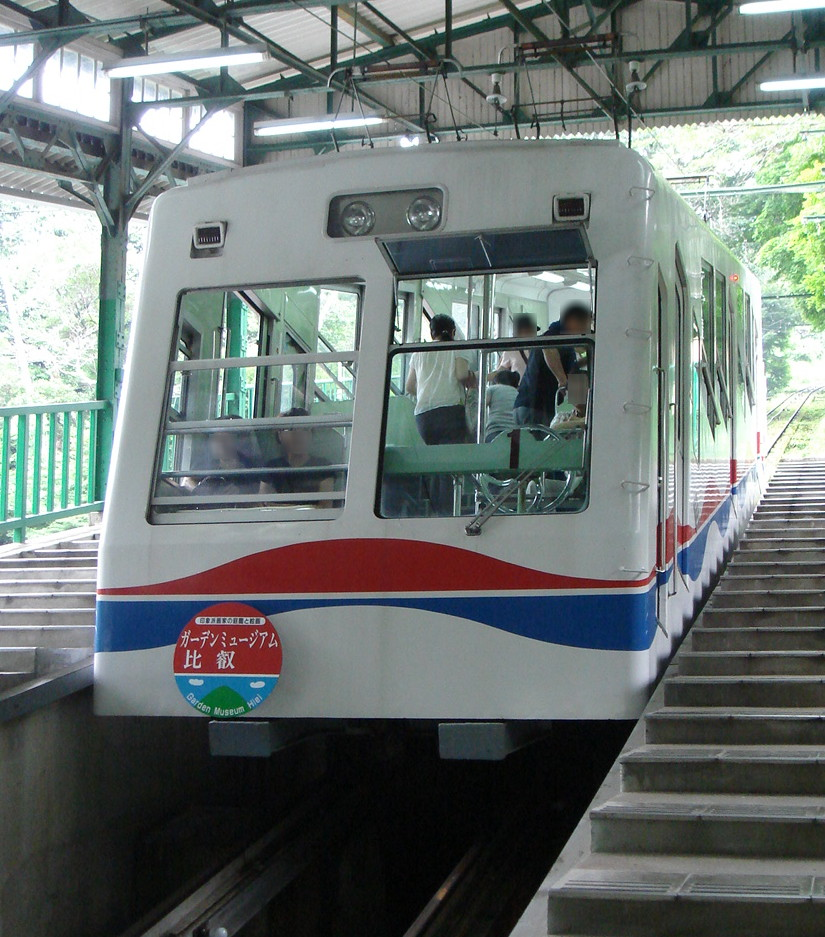
Eizan Cable funicular

Several scenes on a snowy day, 2022

The Eizan Cable (叡山ケーブル, Eizan Kēburu), officially the Cable Line (鋼索線, Kōsaku-sen), is a funicular line in Sakyō, Kyōto, Japan, operated by Keifuku Electric Railroad. The line opened in 1925, as a western route to Enryaku-ji, a famous temple on Mount Hiei. The line has 561 m (1,841 ft) vertical interval, the largest in the country.

== Basic data ==
- Distance: 1.3 km (0.81 mi)
- Gauge: 1,067 mm (3 ft 6 in)
- Stations: 2
- Vertical interval: 561 m (1,841 ft)

== See also ==
- List of funicular railways
- List of railway lines in Japan
- Sakamoto Cable – on the other side of the mountain
