= Amanohashidate Cable Car =

Japanese funicular line in Miyazu, Kyōto, Japan

Coordinates: 35°35′5.5″N 135°11′44.1″E

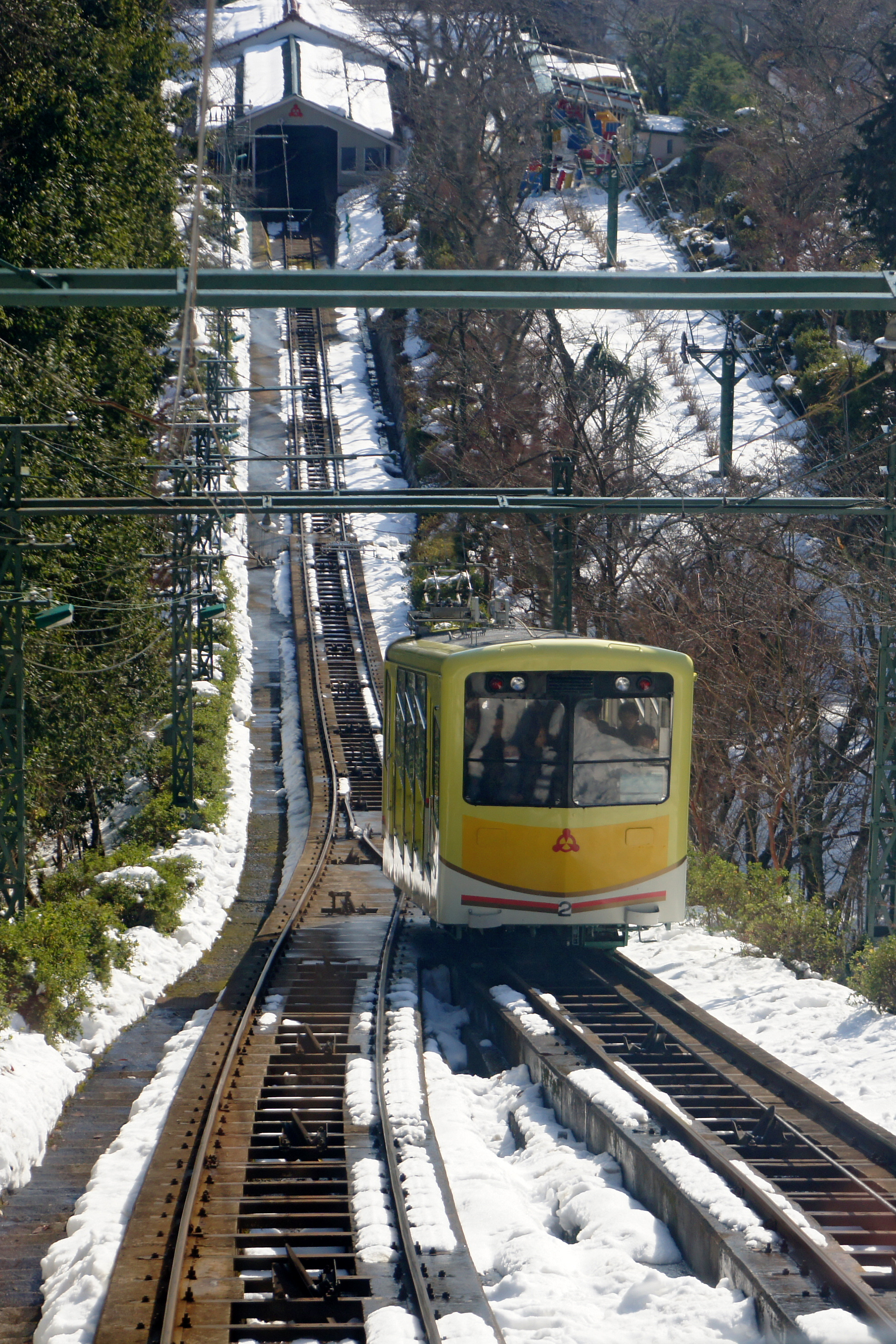
Amanohashidate Cable Car funicular.

The Amanohashidate Cable Car (天橋立ケーブルカー, Amanohashidate Kēburukā) is a Japanese funicular line in Miyazu, Kyōto. The line is also called Amanohashidate Cable Railway (天橋立鋼索鉄道, Amanohashidate Kōsaku Tetsudō) or Kasamatsu Cable (傘松ケーブル, Kasamatsu Kēburu), but it does not have any official name. This is the only funicular line Tango Kairiku Kōtsū (丹後海陸交通; "Tango Sea and Land Transport") operates, while it also operates buses and ships. The company is abbreviated as Tankai (丹海). The line opened in 1927 as a route to Nariai-ji temple, with a scenic view of Amanohashidate. A chairlift runs along the line as well.

== Basic data ==
- Distance: 0.4 km or 0.2 mi
- Gauge: 1,067 mm (3 ft 6 in)
- Stations: 2
- Vertical interval: 130 m or 427 ft

== See also ==
- List of funicular railways
- List of railway companies in Japan
- List of railway lines in Japan
