= Akita Rinkai Railway Line =

Freight-only railway line in Akita prefecture, Japan

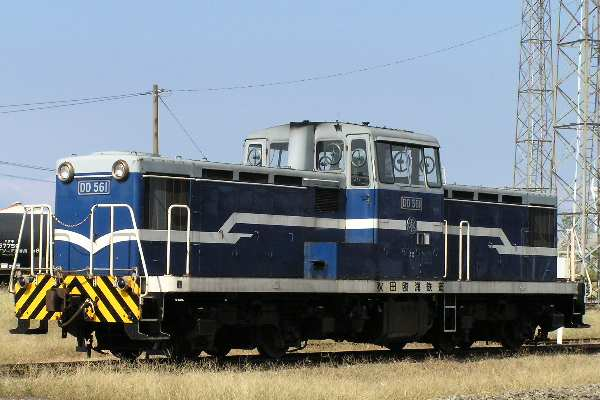
- Akita Rinkai Railway diesel locomotive No. DD561

Overview
- Owner: Akita Rinkai Railway
- Stations: None (freight only)

Service
- Type: Freight rail

History
- Closed: 2021

Technical
- Line length: 7.9 km (4.9 mi)
- Number of tracks: 1
- Track gauge: 1,067 mm (3 ft 6 in)
- Electrification: None

The Akita Rinkai Railway Line (秋田臨海鉄道線, Akita Rinkai Tetsudō-sen) was a Japanese freight-only railway line between Akita Kitakō Freight Terminal and Mukaihama Freight Terminal via Akita Port (Akitakō) Station, all within Akita, Akita. This was the only railway line Akita Rinkai Railway (秋田臨海鉄道, Akita Rinkai Tetsudō, "Akita Seaside Railway") operated. The third sector company was founded in 1970. The services on the line were divided by Akitakō Station. The north part was commonly called the North Line (北線, Kita-sen), and the south part was called the South Line (南線, Minami-sen). The North Line mainly transported containers of paper products from Nippon Daishōwa Paperboard Tōhoku, while the South Line transported sulfuric acid from Kosaka Smelting & Refining, via the Kosaka Line.

The railway was discontinued on March 31, 2021.

== Basic data ==
=== North Line ===
- Akitakō - Akita-Kitakō
  - Distance: 2.5 km

=== South Line ===
- Akitakō - Mukaihama
  - Distance: 5.4 km

== See also ==
- List of railway companies in Japan
- List of railway lines in Japan
