= Tokyo Metropolitan Subway Construction Company =

Tokyo Metropolitan Subway Construction Co., Ltd. (東京都地下鉄建設株式会社, Tōkyō-to Chikatetsu Kensetsu Kabushiki-gaisha) or Tokyo Subway is a third-sector organization with funding from the government of Tokyo and others. In Japanese, its name is often shortened to Chikaken (地下建). It was established on July 28, 1988, for projects related to the construction of the Toei Oedo Line. It was capitalized at 3 billion yen, including 2 billion from the government of Tokyo.

In 2004, it reported debts exceeding 527 billion yen.

== Notes ==
1. Chikaken web page 経営状況 (Operating conditions) (in Japanese)
