= List of railway lines in Japan =

Railway lines of Japan

List of railway lines in Japan lists existing railway lines in Japan alphabetically.

The vast majority of Japanese railways are classified under two Japanese laws, one for railways (鉄道, tetsudō) and another for tramways (軌道, kidō). The difference between the two is a legal, and not always substantial, one. Some regional rail lines are classified as kidō, while some light rail lines are actually tetsudō. There are also other railways not legally classified as either tetsudō or kidō, such as airport people movers, slope cars (automated small rack monorails), or amusement park rides. Those lines are not listed here.

According to the laws, tetsudō and kidō include conventional railways (overground or underground, including subways), as well as maglev trains, monorails, new transit systems (a blanket term roughly equivalent to people mover or automated guideway transit in other countries), skyrails (automated small cable monorails), trams, trolleybuses, guideway buses, funiculars (called "cable cars" in Japan), and aerial lifts. Among them, all but aerial lifts are listed here. See the list of aerial lifts in Japan article for aerial lifts.

Some industrial railways are also classified as tetsudō or kidō, while some are not. However, this list does not include any industrial railways. See the corresponding Japanese article for the listing.

Tetsudō and kidō also include (non-funicular) cable cars, horsecars, and handcars, but those modes of transportation no longer exist in Japan.

The list basically shows line names without operator names. When the official line name does include the operator name, the line is listed twice, with and without the operator.

To make the search easier, official nicknames and unofficial common names are also listed.

Some English names are tentative translations.

List of railway lines in Japan
| #, A to I | J to P | R to Z |

== See also ==
- List of railway companies in Japan
- Rail transport in Japan
- List of railway stations in Japan
- List of railway electrification systems in Japan
- List of aerial lifts in Japan
- List of airport people mover systems
- List of defunct railway companies in Japan
- ja:専用鉄道 (Industrial railway)
- ja:未成線 (Uncompleted line)
- Monorails in Japan

== Gallery ==
The modes of transport listed below are all classified as railways in Japan.

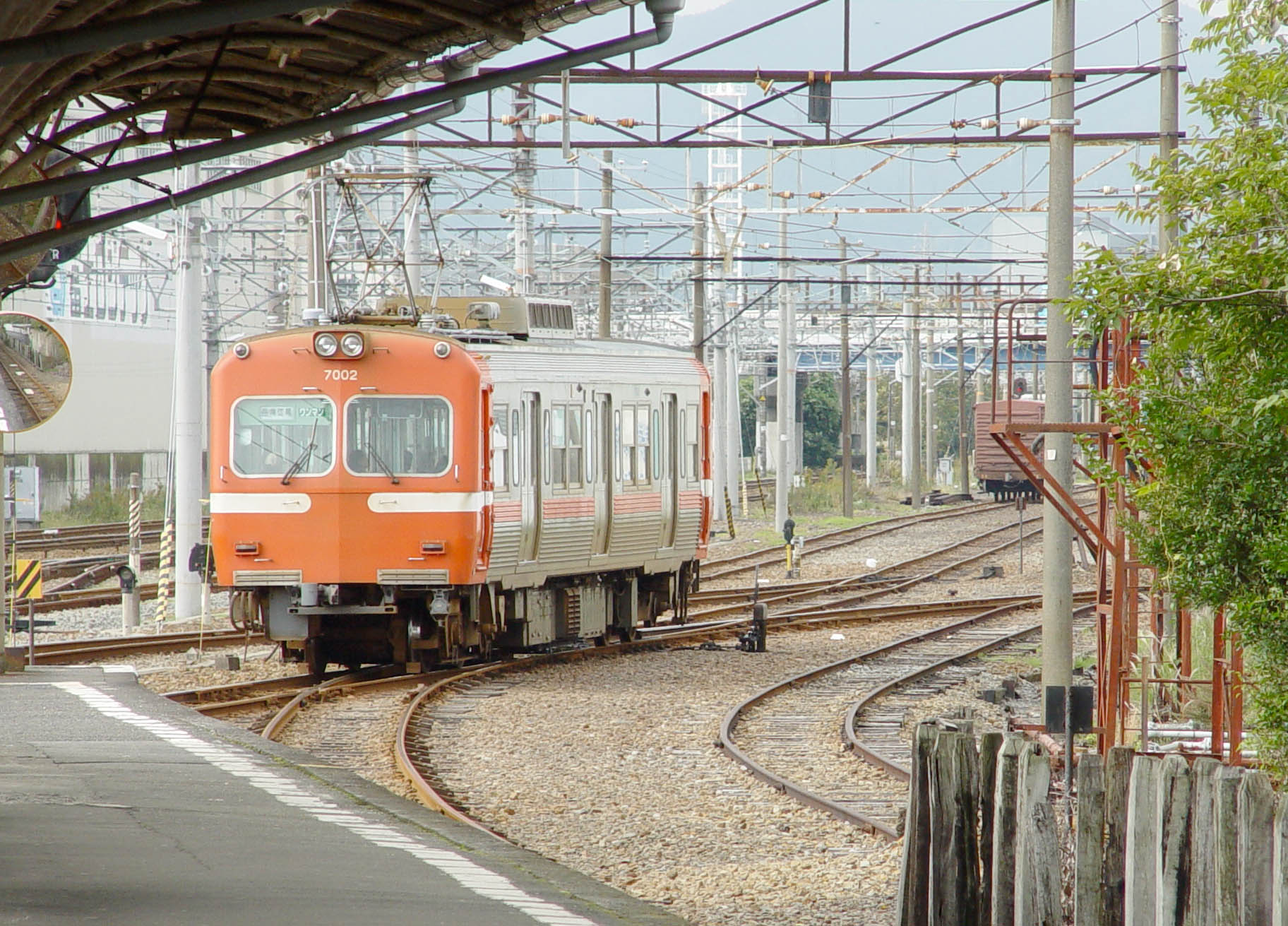
Conventional railway

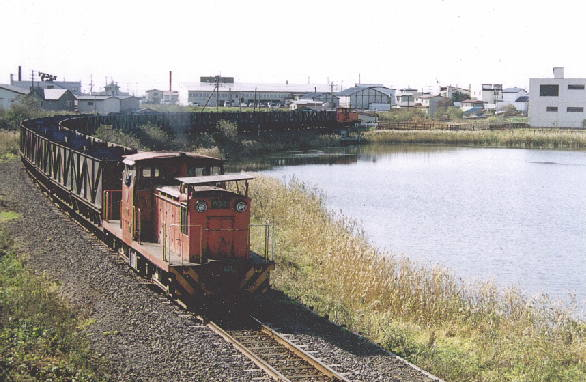
Conventional railway (freight)

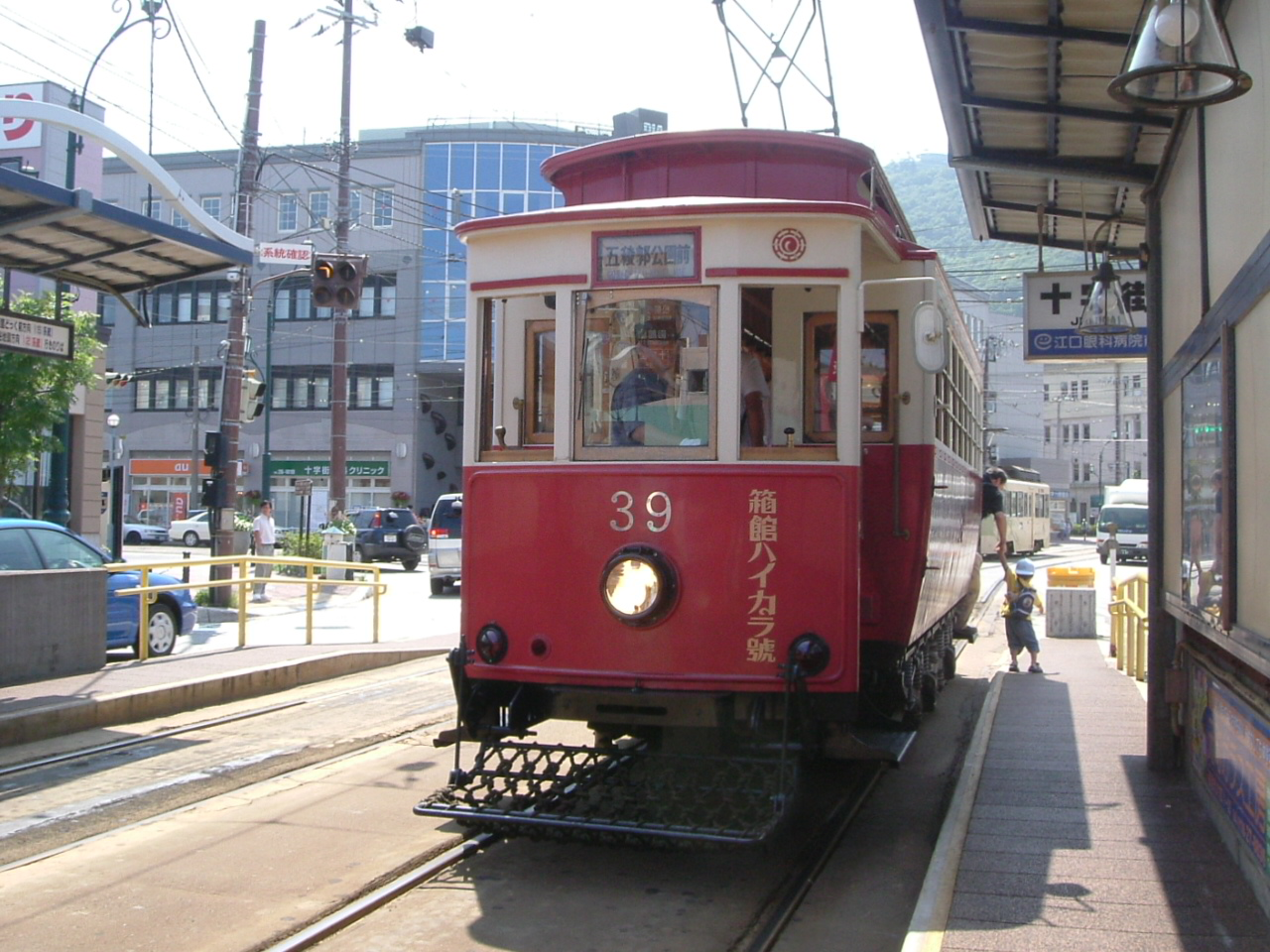
Tramway

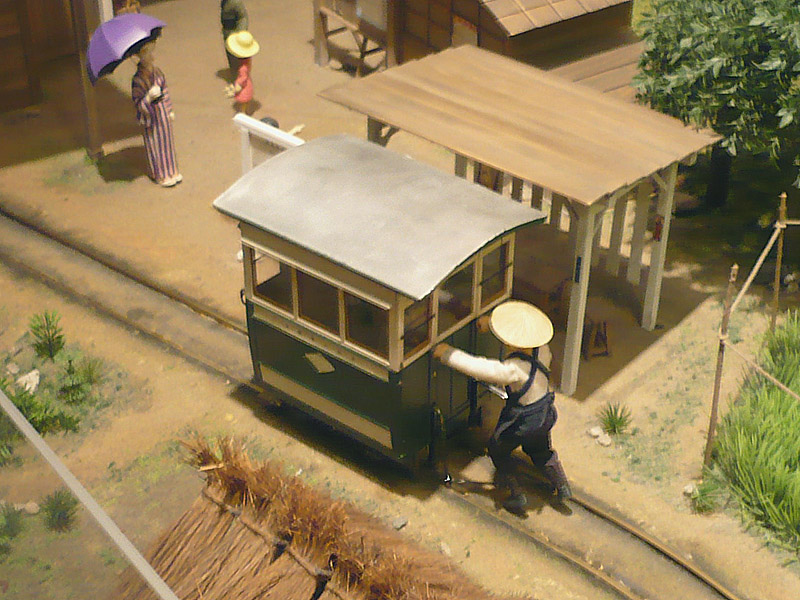
Handcar

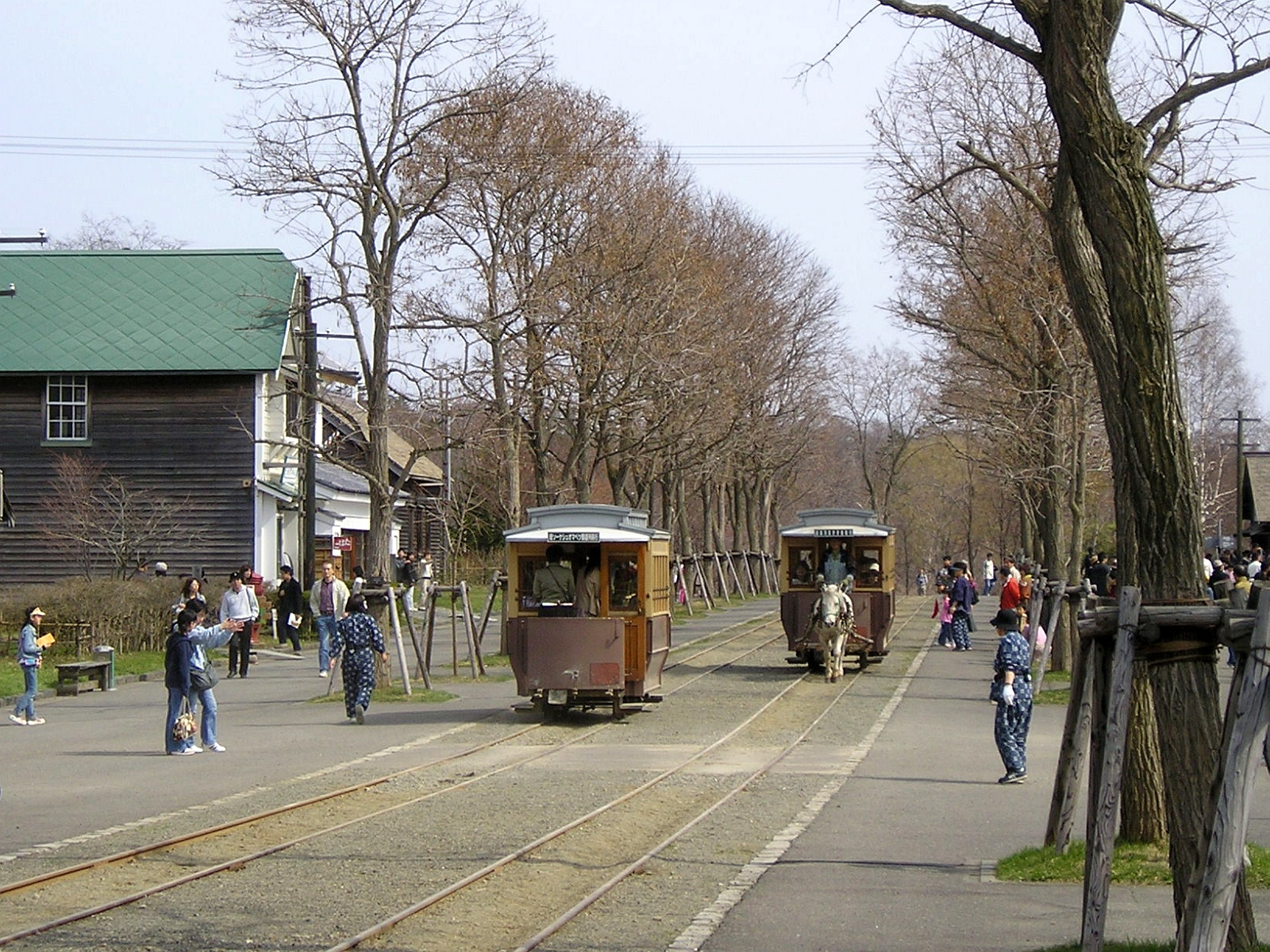
Horsecar

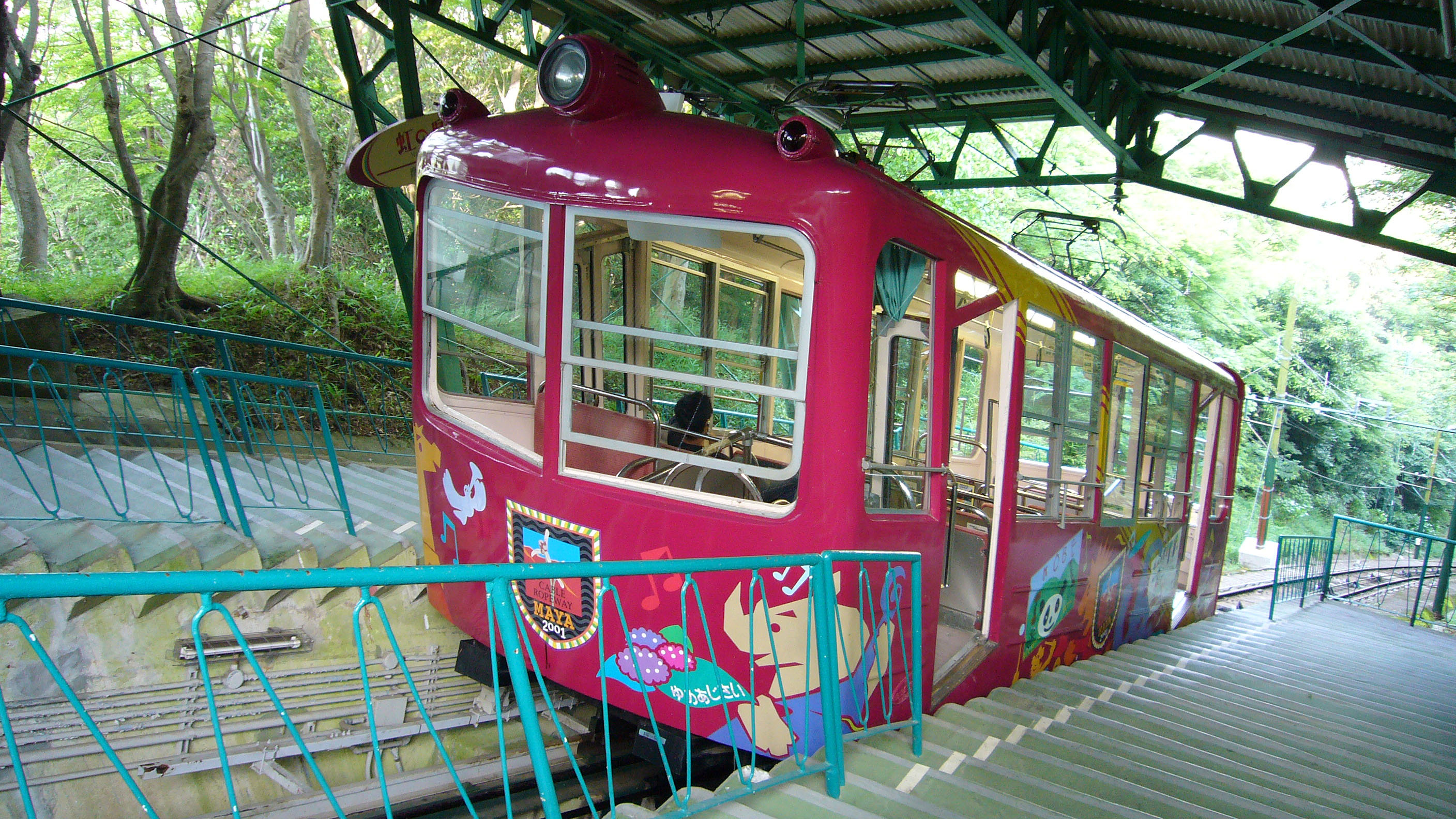
Funicular

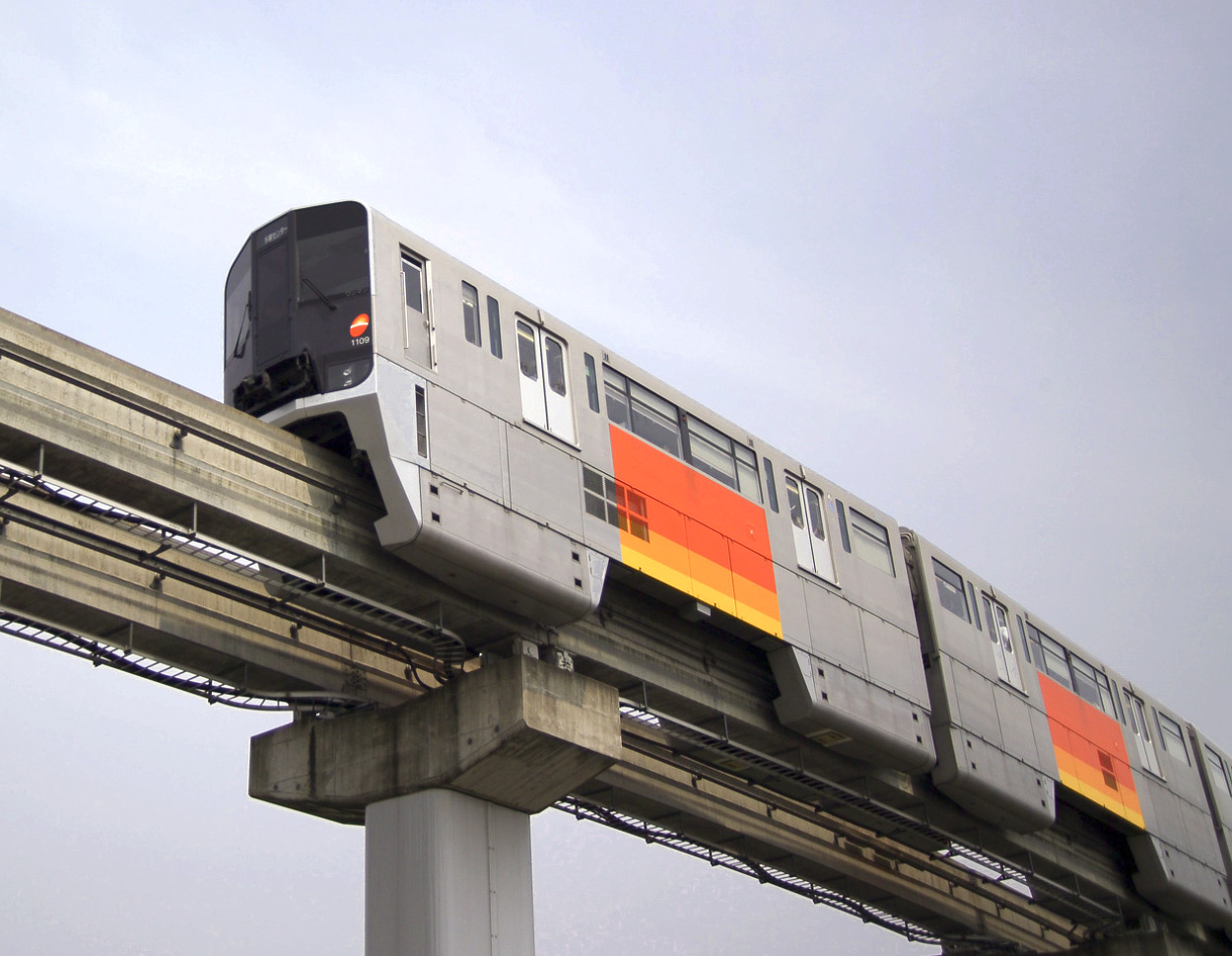
Monorail

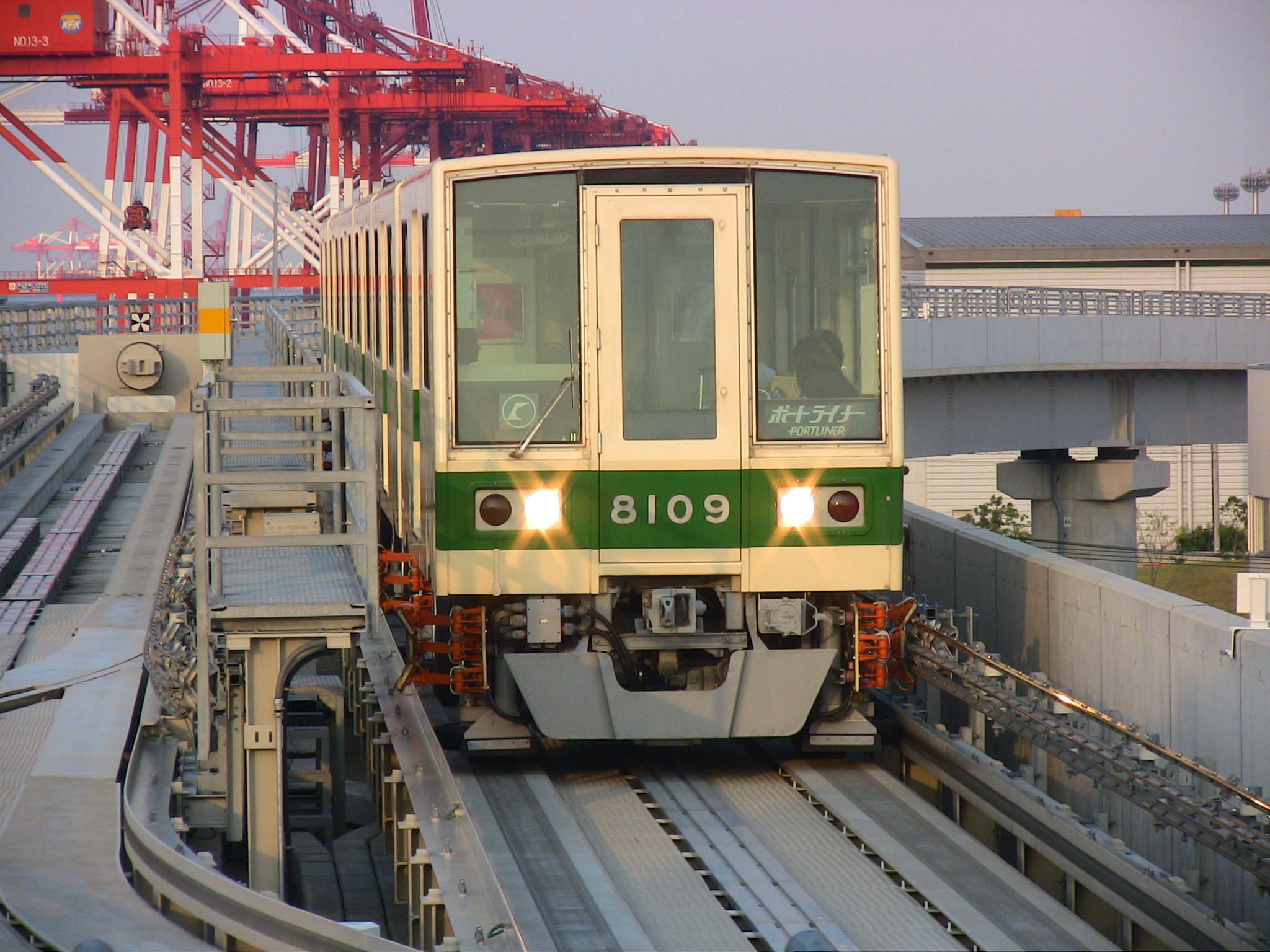
New transit system (people mover)

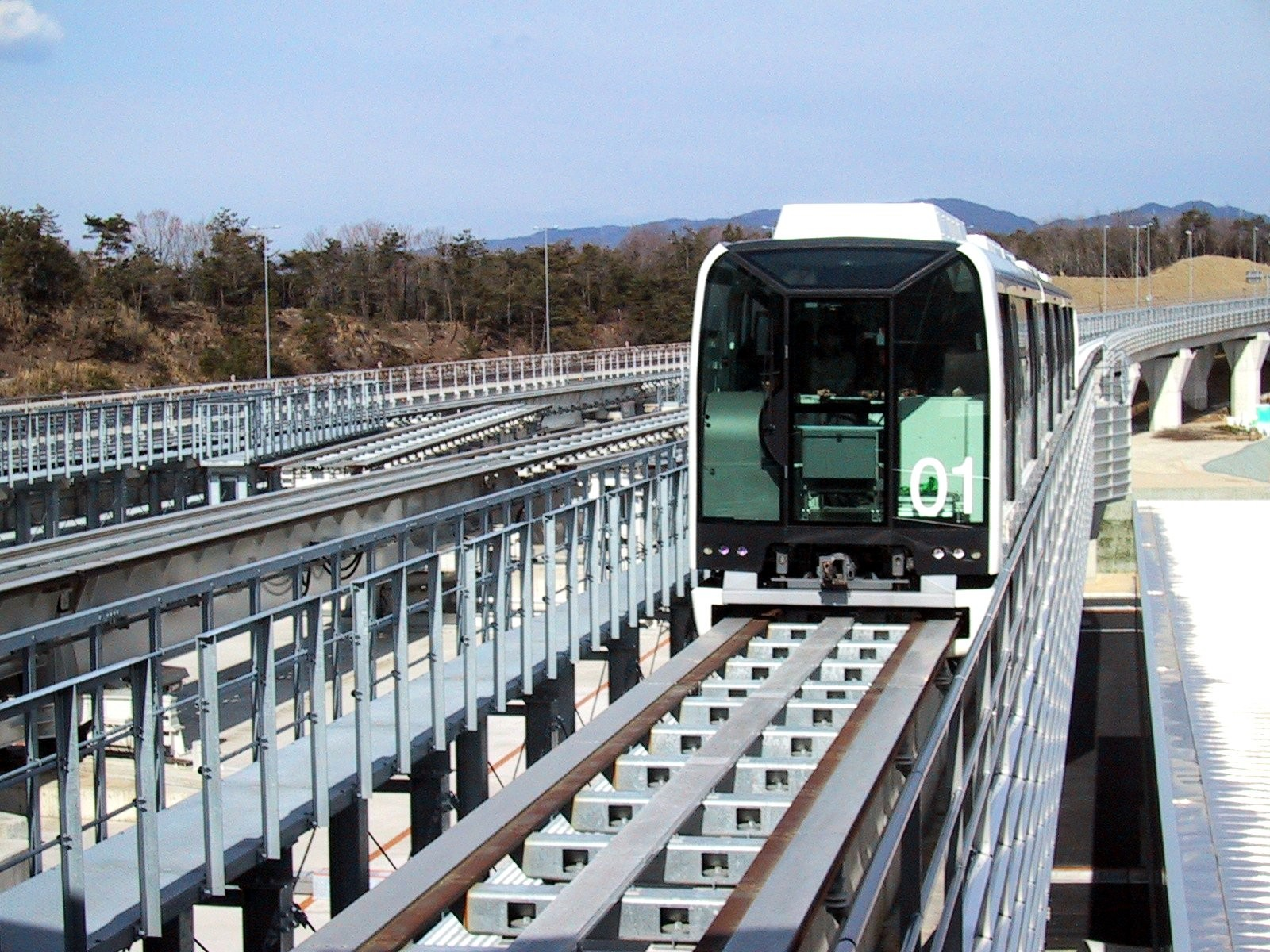
New transit system (maglev)

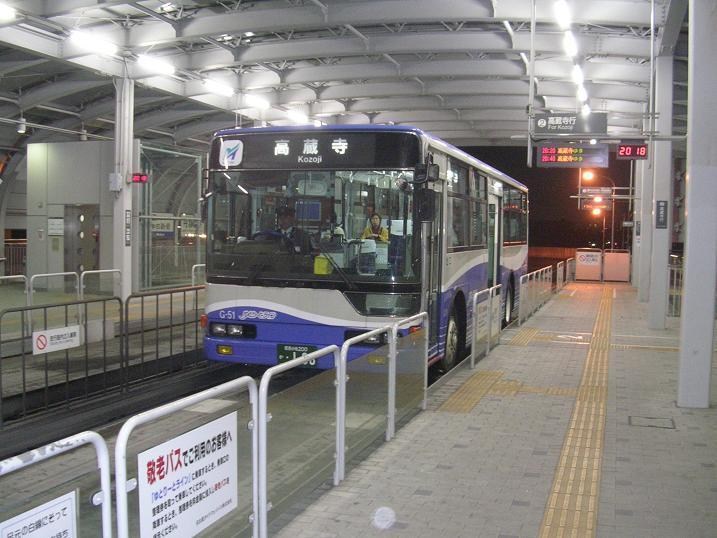
New transit system (guideway bus)

The following are not classified as railways in Japan and are thus not covered in this article.

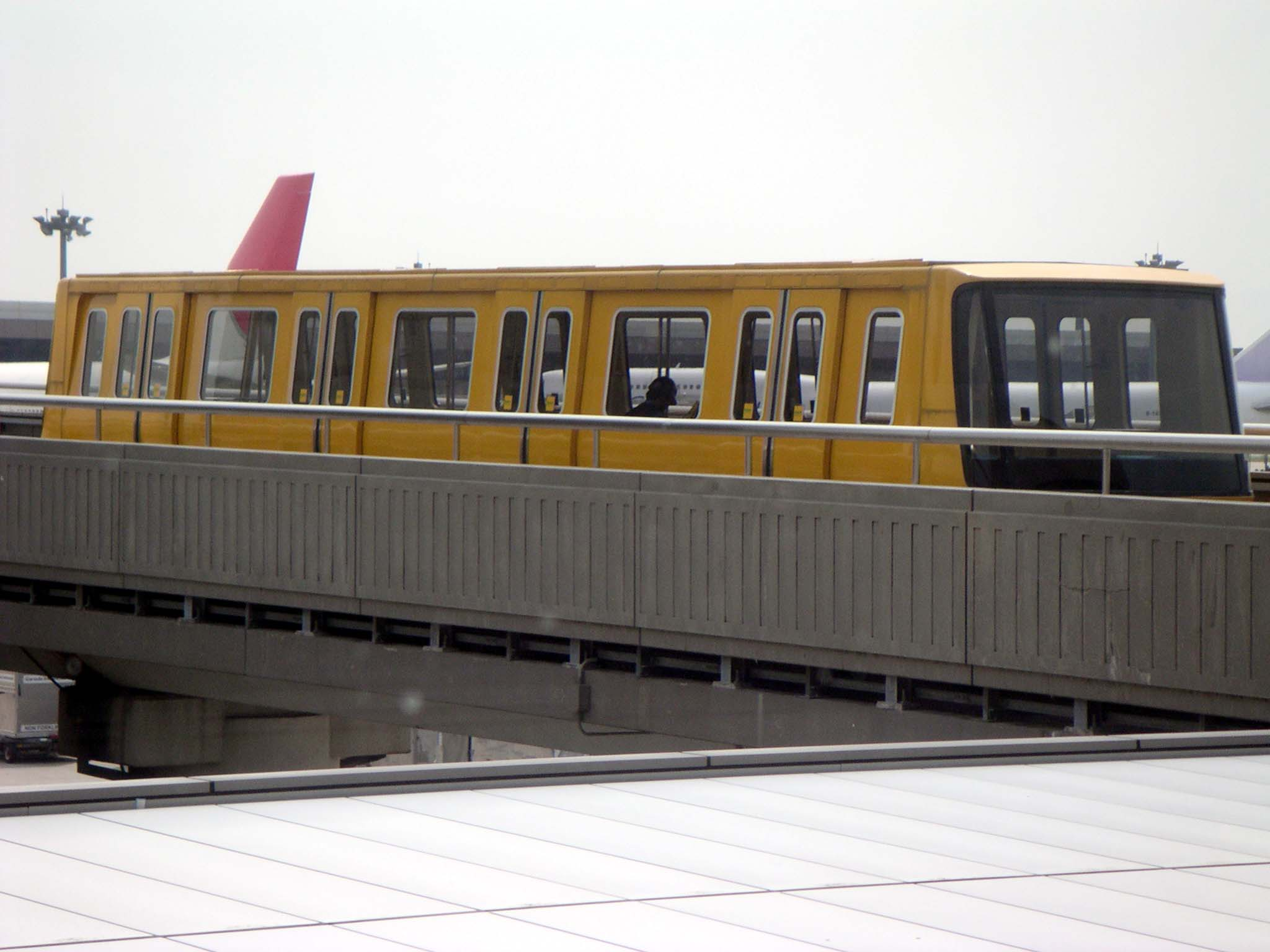
Airport people mover

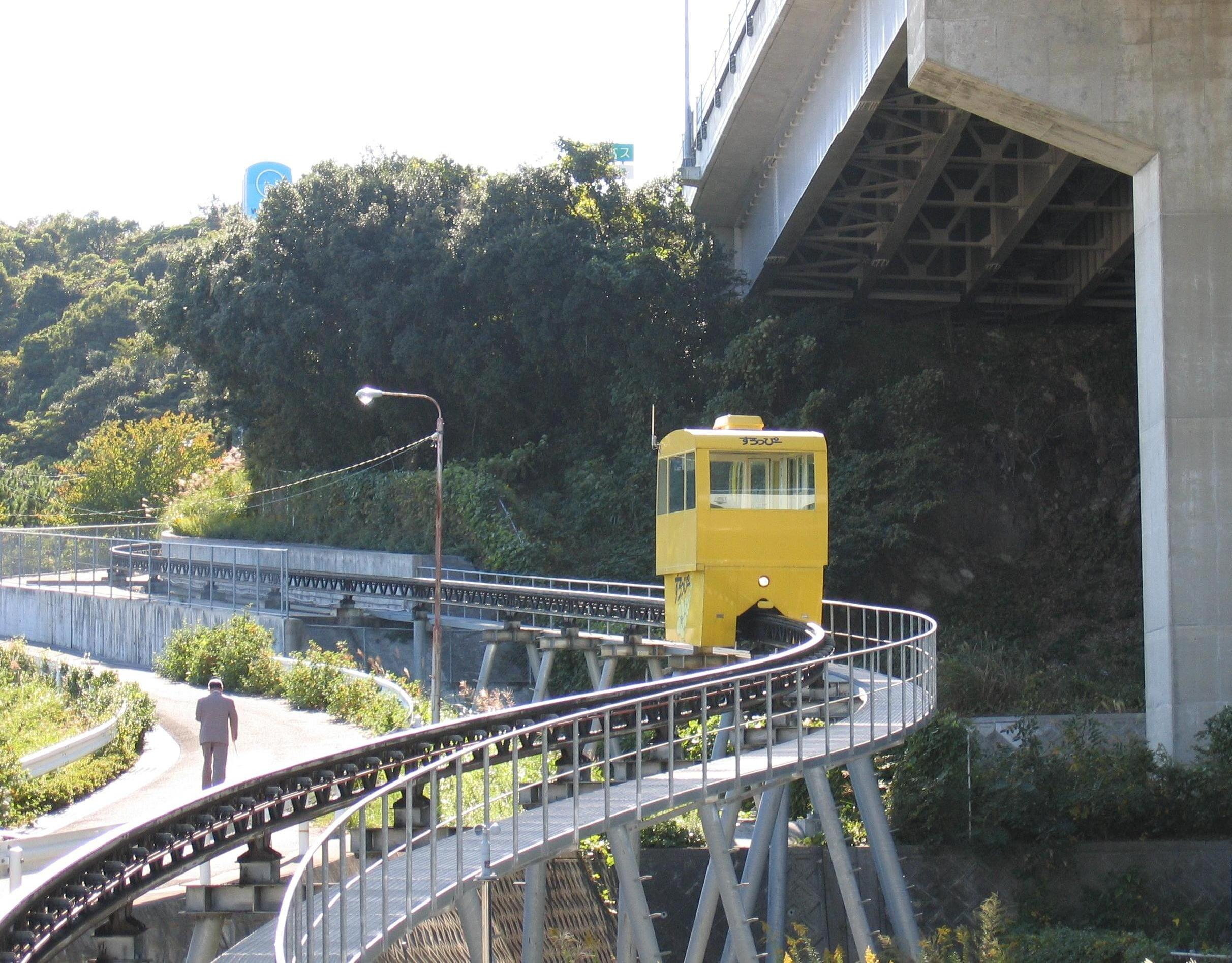
Slope car

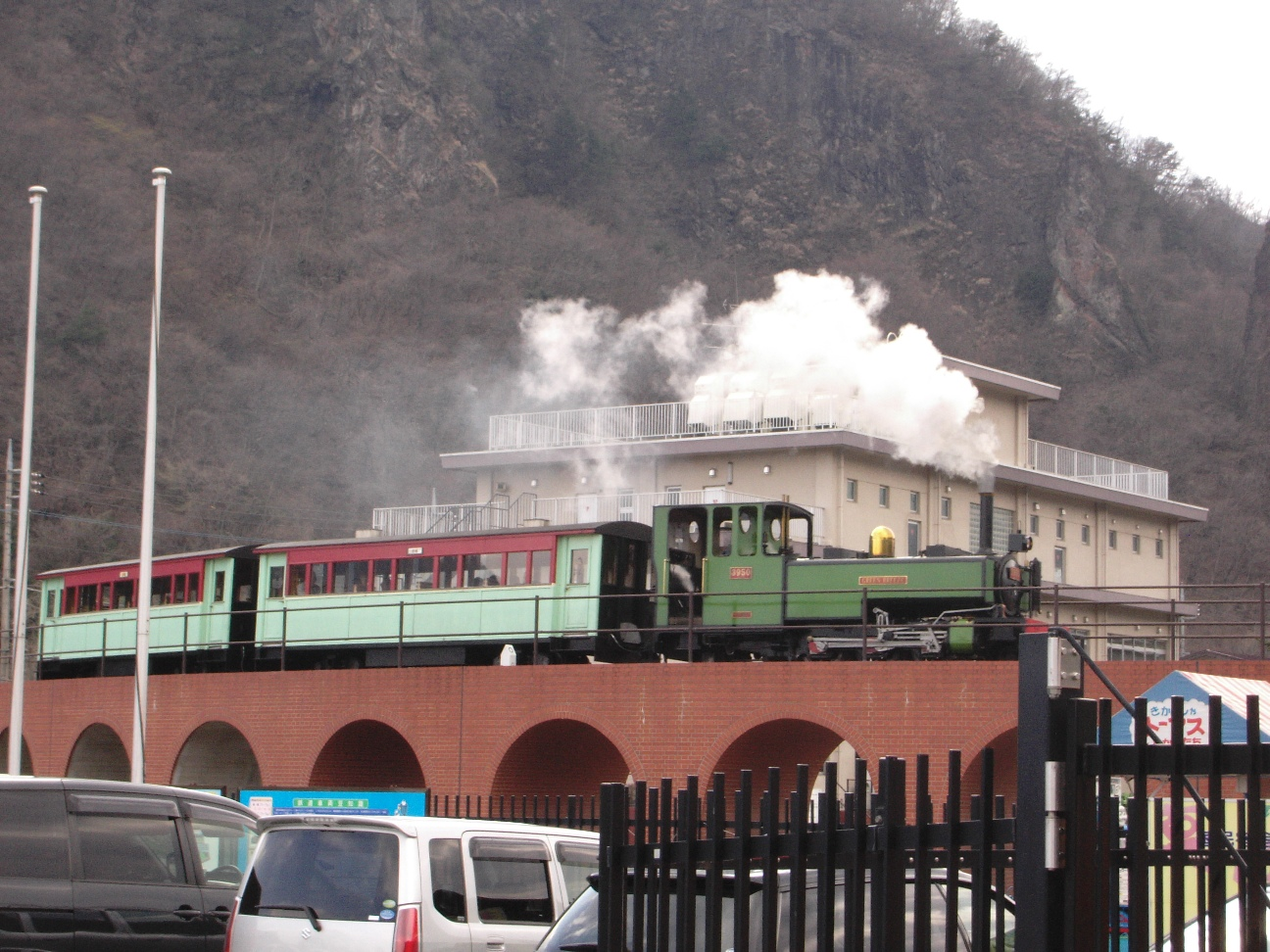
Attraction ride

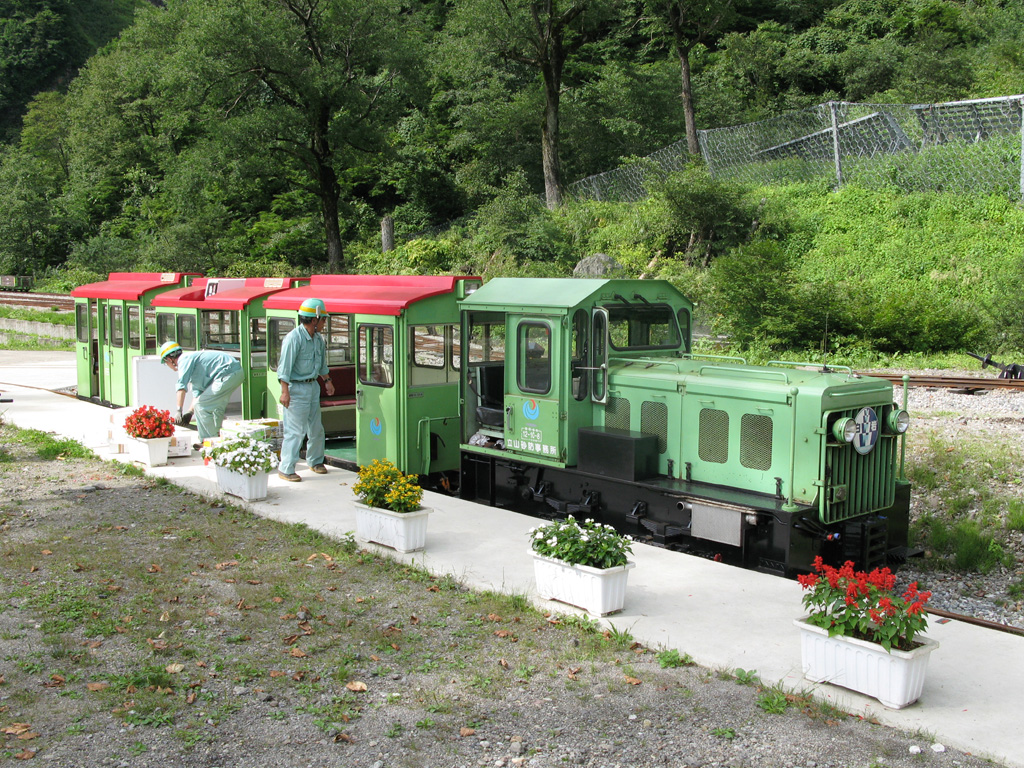
Industrial railway (some of them)
