= Nagasaki Electric Tramway Hotarujaya Line =

Hotarujaya Line
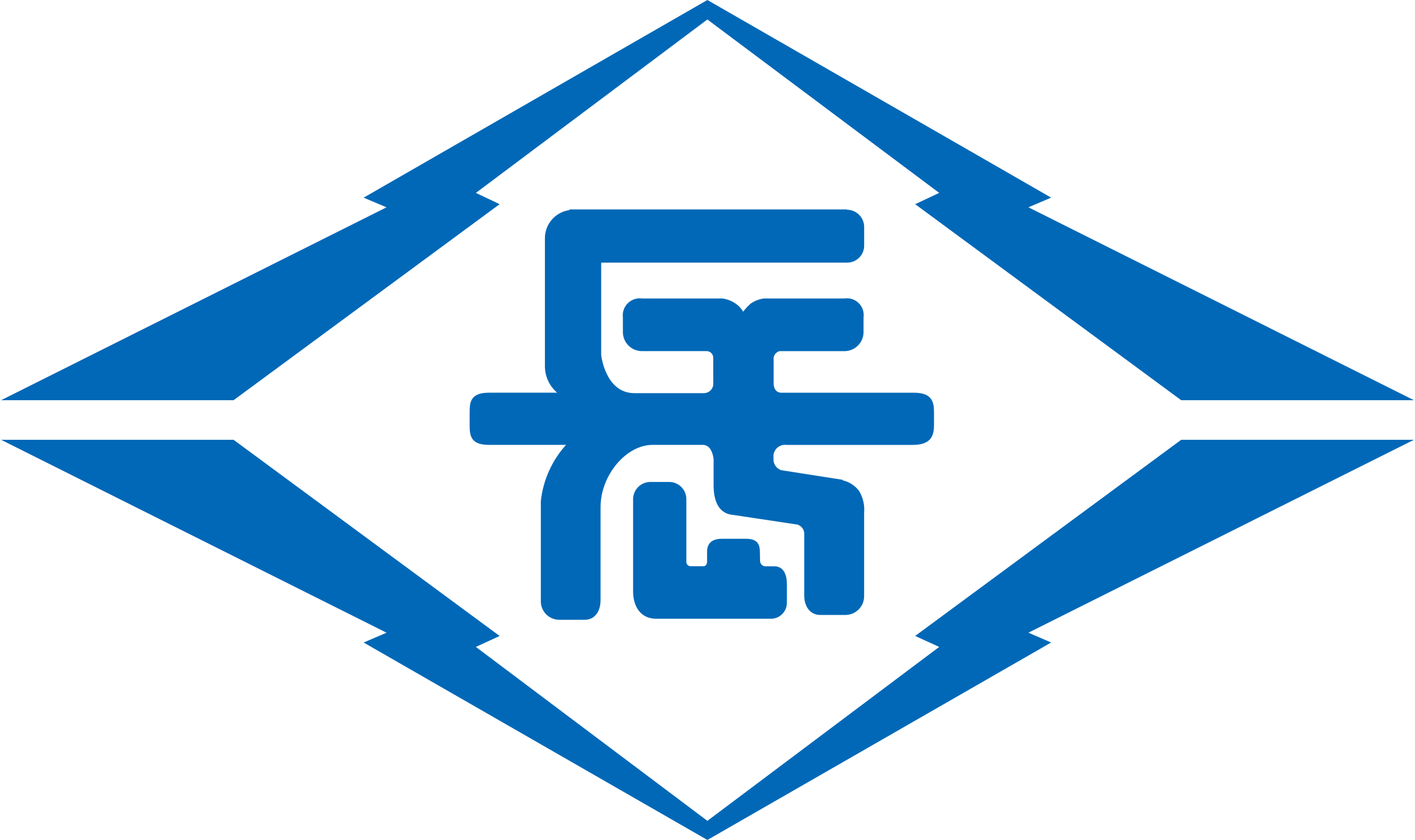

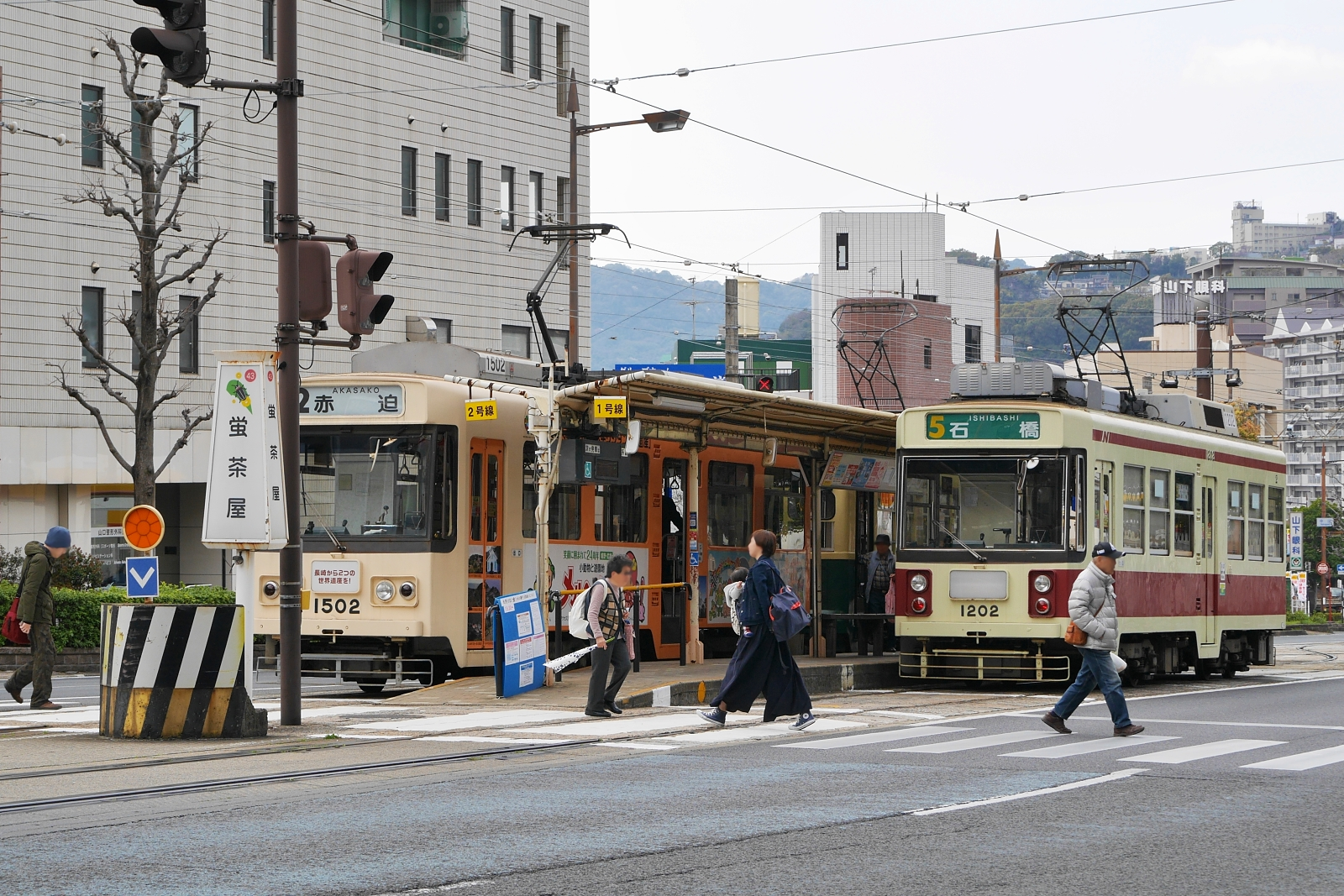
- Hotarujaya Terminal Station

Overview
- Native name: 蛍茶屋支線
- Locale: Nagasaki
- Termini: Nishihamanomachi; Hotarujaya
- Stations: 8

Service
- Operator(s): Nagasaki Electric Tramway

History
- Opened: 9 July 1920

Technical
- Line length: 2.2 km
- Number of tracks: 2
- Track gauge: 1,435 mm (4 ft 8 1/2 in)
- Electrification: 600 V DC overhead
Route map
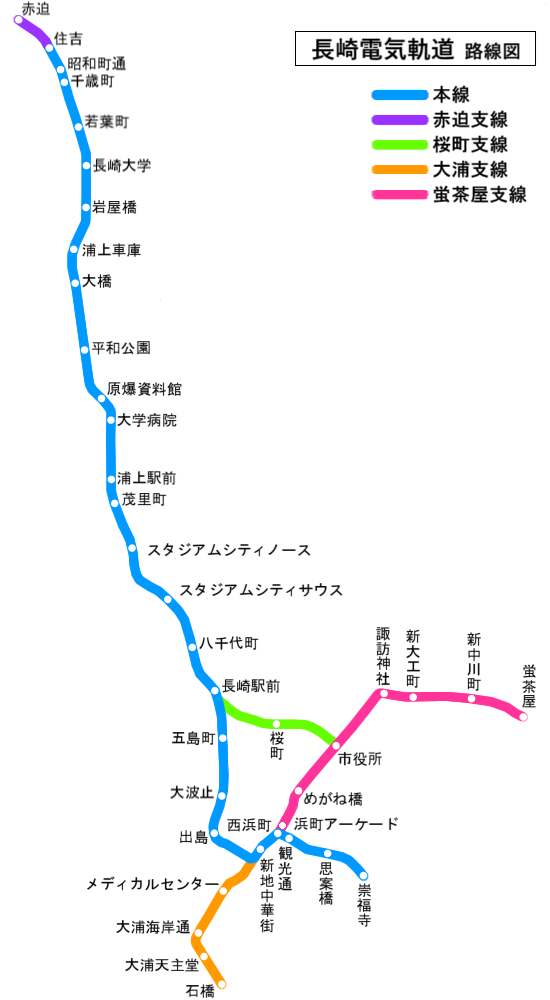
Hotarujaya Line (shown by the pink line)

The Nagasaki Electric Tramway Hotarujaya Line (長崎電気軌道蛍茶屋支線, Nagasaki-denki-kidō Hotarujaya-shisen) is a light rail line operated by the private railway operator Nagasaki Electric Tramway in the island of Kyushu, Japan. This line is entirely located within Nagasaki.

== Overview ==
Hotarujaya Line is the branch to the eastern urban area of Nagasaki. There is Hotarujaya Rail Yard at the end of this line, therefore most trains of Nagasaki Electric Tramway go to Hotarujaya.

The following routes are operated in this line:

- □ Route 2: Akasako — Sumiyoshi — Nagasaki-Ekimae — Nishihamanomachi — City Hall — Hotarujaya
- ■ Route 3: Akasako — Sumiyoshi — Nagasaki-Ekimae — Sakuramachi — City Hall — Hotarujaya
- ■ Route 4: Sofukuji Temple — Kankodori — Hamanomachi Arcade — City Hall — Hotarujaya
- ■ Route 5: Ishibashi — Shinchi Chinatown — Nishihamanomachi — City Hall — Hotarujaya

== Stations ==
No.	Station	Japanese	Distance (km)	Transfers
32	Nishihamanomachi	西浜町	0.0	Nagasaki Electric Tramway: Main Line
36	Hamanomachi Arcade	浜町アーケード	0.1	
37	Meganebashi	めがね橋	0.4	
38	City Hall	市役所	0.8	Nagasaki Electric Tramway: Sakuramachi Line
39	Suwa-jinja Shrine	諏訪神社	1.3	
40	Shindaikumachi	新大工町	1.5	
41	Shinnakagawamachi	新中川町	1.9	
43	Hotarujaya	蛍茶屋	2.2	

== History ==
The first section opened in 25 December 1920, between Furumachi (古町) (Note: Furumachi station closed in 1954, by opening Okeyamachi (桶屋町) Station, now City Hall Station.) and Umamachi (馬町), as a part of the branch from Nagasaki-Ekimae (now Sakuramachi Line). In the same year, this line connected to Sembacho (千馬町: now Shinchi Chinatown) and Ishibashi by opening the section between Nishihamanomachi and Furumachi.In 1922, a rail yard was built near Umamachi Station, which made Hotarujaya Line important.

The last part, between Umamachi and Hotarujaya, opened in 1934. Umamachi Station and its rail yard closed in a few months ago. In 1937, Hotarujaya Rail Yard opened.
