= Rail transport in Japan =

Japan

Operation
- Infrastructure company: Category 1 and Category 3 Railway Businesses, JRTT
- Major operators: JR Groups, Large private railway companies, Third-sector railway operators

Statistics
- Ridership: 7.589 billion (2014)
- Passenger-distance: 260 billion (2014)

System length
- Total: 30,625 km
- Electrified: 21,600 km

Features
Map
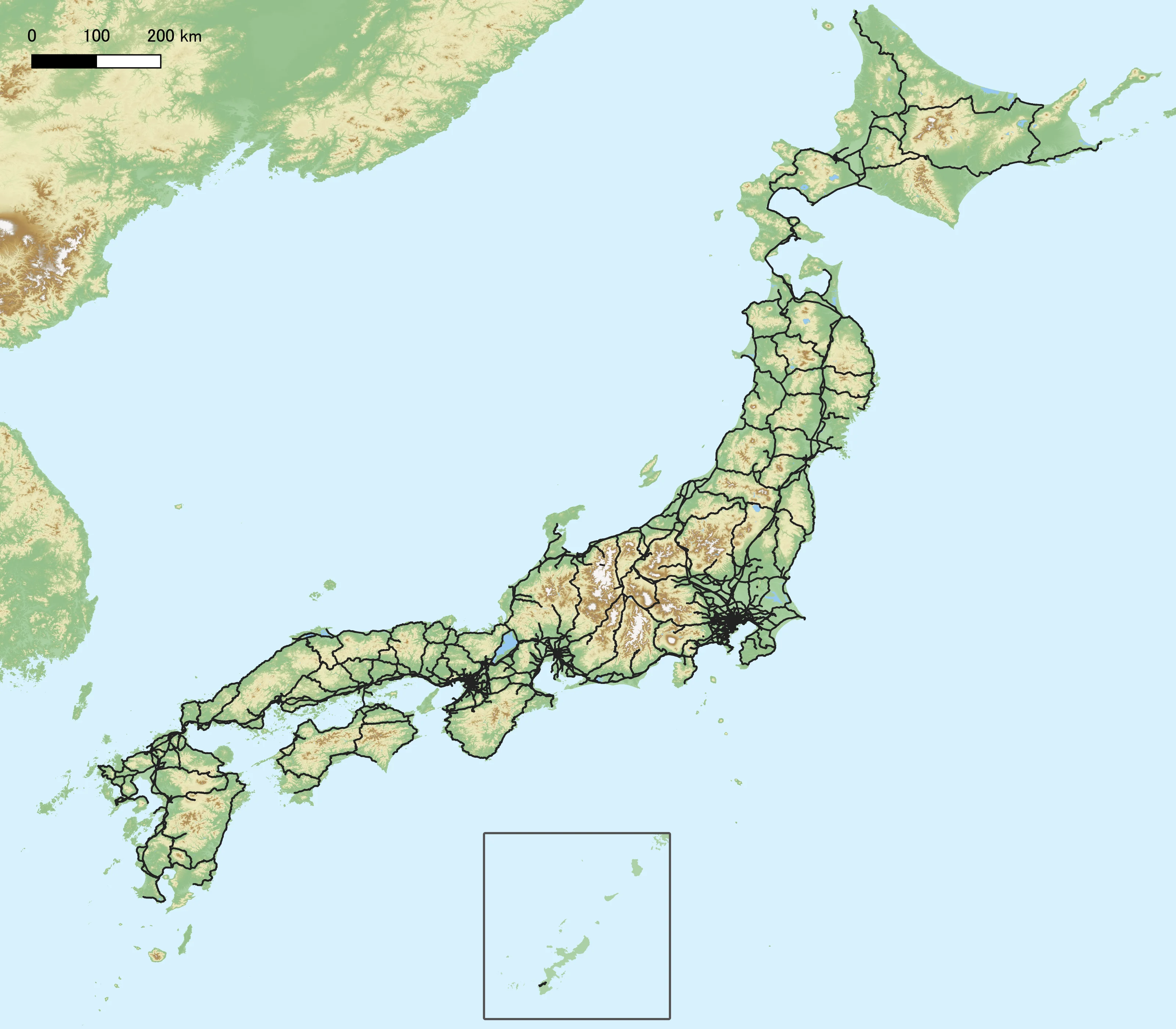
- Railway map of Japan

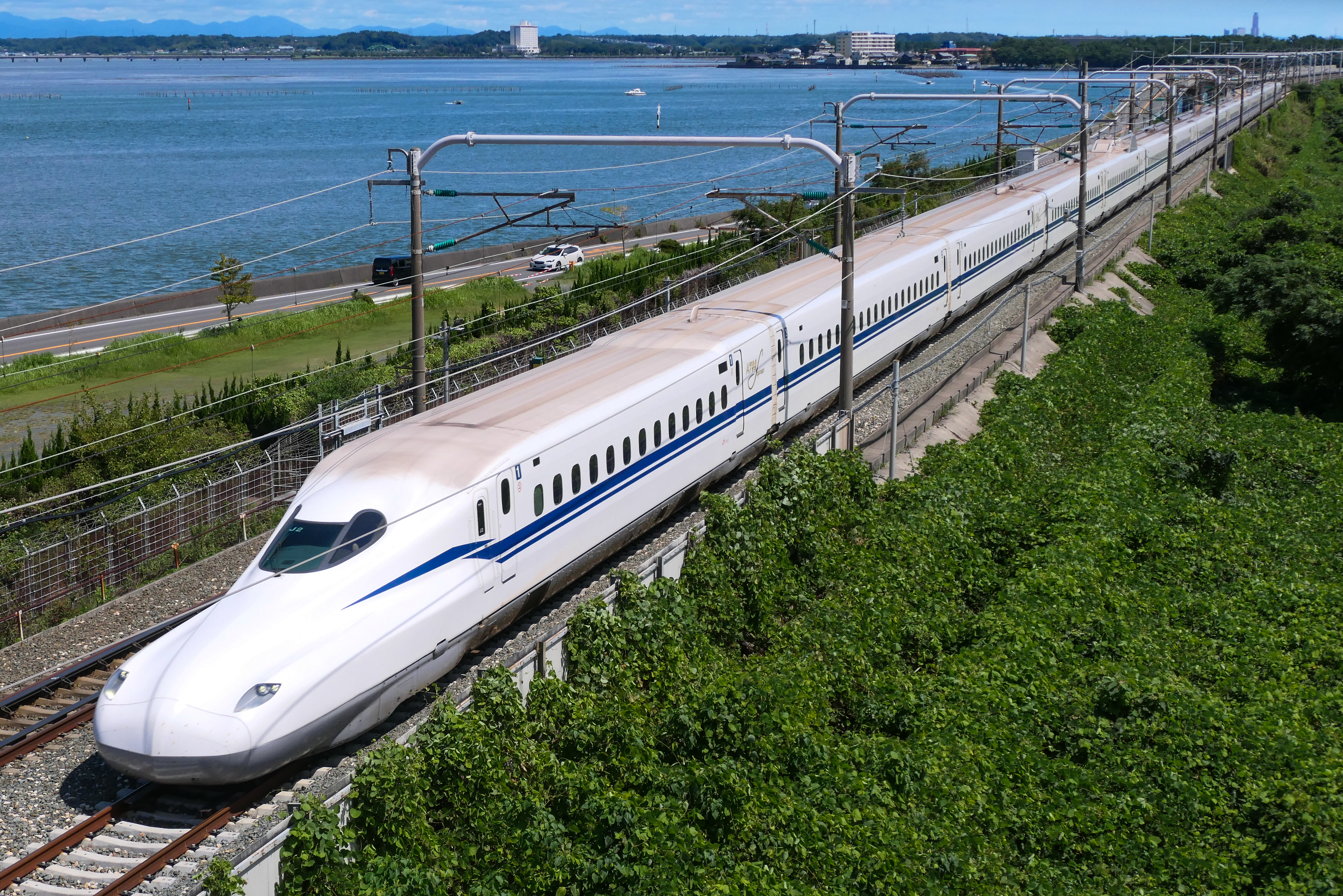
N700S series Shinkansen train

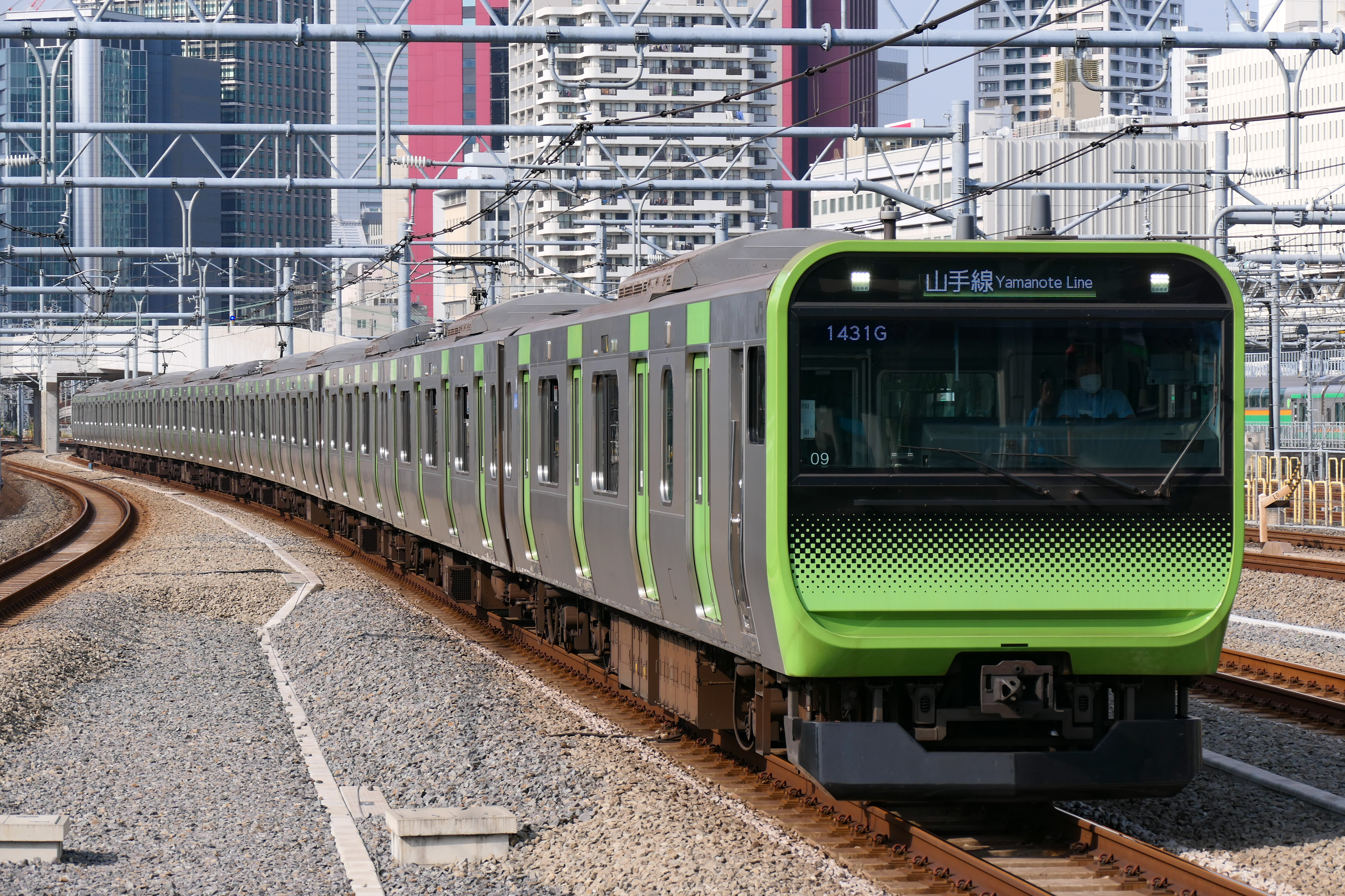
E235 series train on the Yamanote Line

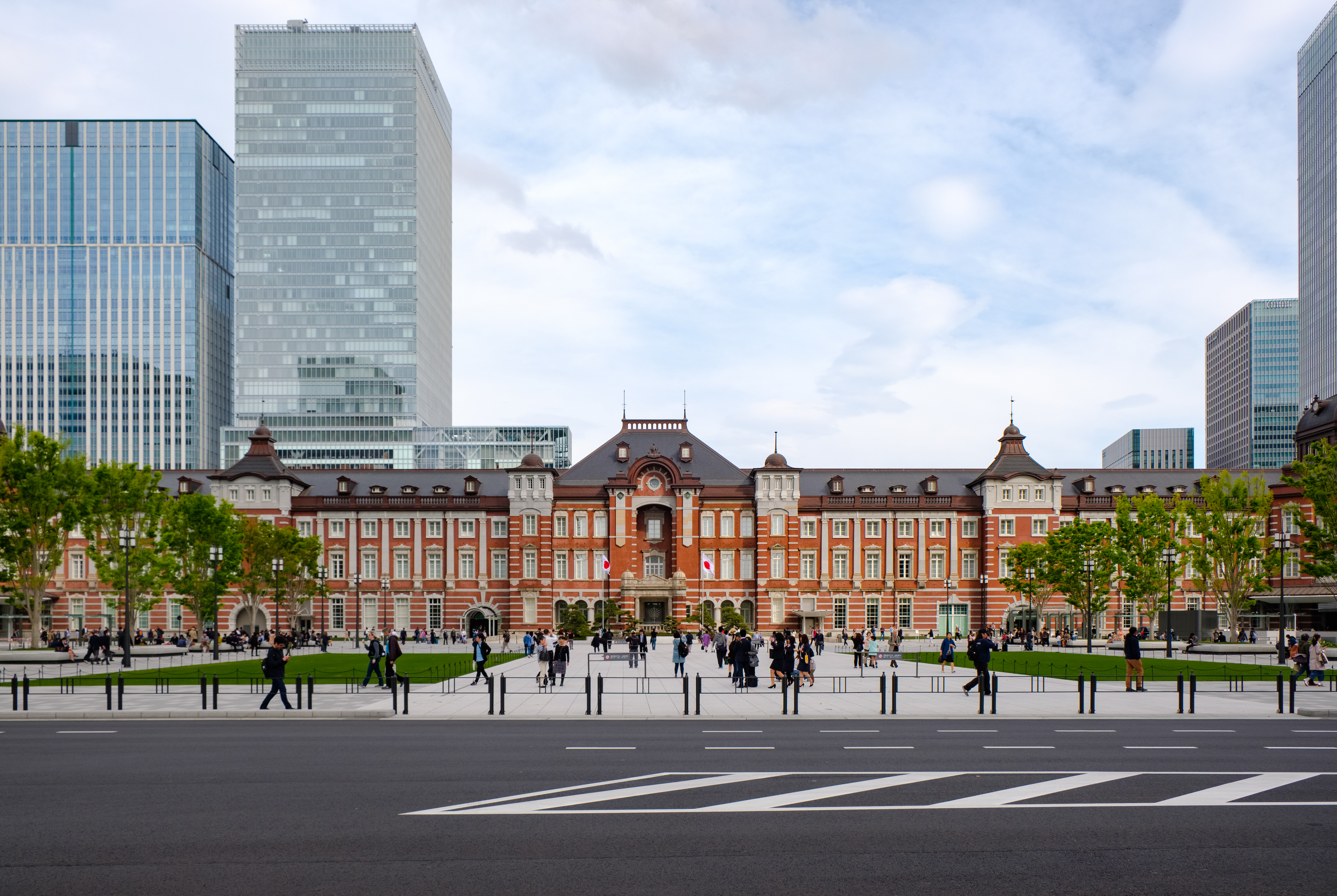
Tokyo Station in Tokyo

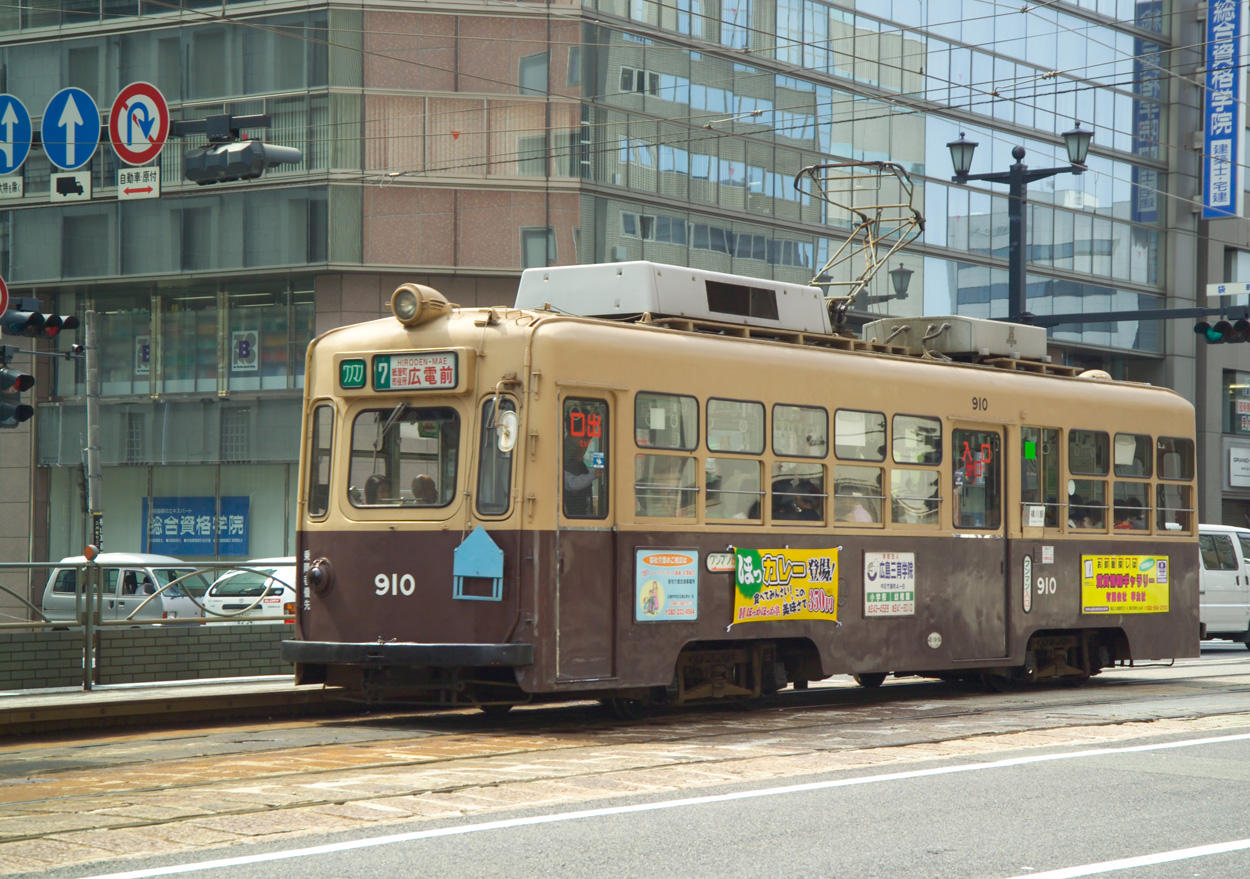
Hiroden Tram in Hiroshima

Rail transport in Japan is a major means of passenger transport, especially for mass and high-speed travel between major cities and for commuter transport in urban areas. It is used relatively little for freight transport, accounting for just 0.84% of goods movement. The privatized network is highly efficient, requiring few subsidies and running with extreme punctuality, though since privatization, several unprofitable but socially valuable lines have been closed by operators.

== Overview ==
Rail transport services in Japan are provided by more than 100 companies, including:

- The six Japan Railways Group (JR) regional companies (state owned until 1987) which provide passenger services: JR Central, JR East, JR Hokkaido, JR Kyushu, JR Shikoku, and JR West
- The nationwide JR Freight company
- The 16 major private railway operators: Hankyu, Hanshin, Keikyu, Keihan, Keio, Keisei, Kintetsu, Meitetsu, Nankai, Nishitetsu, Odakyu, Seibu, Sotetsu, Tobu, Tokyo Metro, and Tokyu
- Dozens of smaller local railways

Many of the private rail companies rank among the top corporations in the country. Railways were built by private corporations developing integrated communities along the railway lines, allowing them to achieve profitability by diversifying into real estate, retail, and numerous other businesses. These rail integrated communities are a form of transit oriented development unique to the rail system in Japan. Rail integrated communities increase walkability in these urban spaces. As they are to be used by pedestrians, they include sidewalks and bikeways. Regional governments, and companies funded jointly by regional governments and private companies, also provide rail service.

There are 30,625 km (19,029 mi) of rail crisscrossing the country. JR (a group of companies formed after privatization of JNR) controlled 20,135 km of these lines as of March 31, 1996, with the remaining 7,133 km (4,432 mi) in the hands of private enterprise local railway companies. Japan's railways carried 9.147 billion passengers (260 billion passenger-kilometres) in the year 2013–14. In comparison, Germany has over 40,000 km (25,000 mi) of railways, but carries only 2.2 billion passengers per year. Because of the massive use of its railway system, Japan is home to 46 of the world's 50 busiest stations.

The major usage is of urban and intercity lines, and around the time of the privatisation of JNR, many unprofitable local and rural lines were closed, especially in Hokkaido and Kyushu. However, with patronage on many non-urban local lines continuing to decline due to factors such as rising levels of car ownership and declining rural populations, further closures are planned. For example, On October 16, 2015, JR West announced that it was considering closing the 108 km (67 mi) Sanko Line due to poor patronage, and was in discussion with the two prefectures served by the line, Shimane and Hiroshima, as well as other municipalities served, concerning future plans. In fiscal 2014, the line carried an average of 50 passengers per km per day, compared to 458 per km per day in 1987. The entire line closed on March 31, 2018.

On November 19, 2016, JR Hokkaido's President announced plans to further rationalise its network by up to 1,237 km (769 mi), or ~50% of the current network, including closure of the remaining section of the Rumoi Main Line (the Rumoi - Mashike section closed on December 4, 2016), the Shin-Yubari - Yubari section of the Sekisho Line, the non-electrified section of the Sassho Line and the Nemuro Line between Furano and Kami-Ochiai Junction. Other lines including the Sekihoku Main Line, Senmo Main Line, the Nayoro - Wakkanai section of the Soya Line and Kushiro - Nemuro section of the Nemuro Line are proposed for conversion to Third Sector operation, but if local governments are not agreeable, such sections will also face closure.

Fukuoka, Kobe, Kyoto, Nagoya, Osaka, Sapporo, Sendai, Tokyo and Yokohama have subway systems. However, unlike Europe, the vast majority of passenger traffic is on suburban commuter trains that criss-cross metropolitan areas. In addition, many cities have streetcar and monorail networks.

Japan pioneered the high-speed shinkansen or "bullet train", which now links Japan's largest cities at speeds of up to 320 km/h (200 mph). However, other trains running on the conventional line or "zairaisen" remain relatively slow, operating at fastest 160 km/h (99 mph) and mostly under 130 km/h (81 mph), most likely due to the wide usage of narrow-gauge tracks they operate on.

Japan's railways carried 31 million tons (21 billion tonne-kilometres) of goods in 2013–14. The share of railways in the national logistics is as small as 6.2% (2010), by far the lowest in the G8.

== History ==
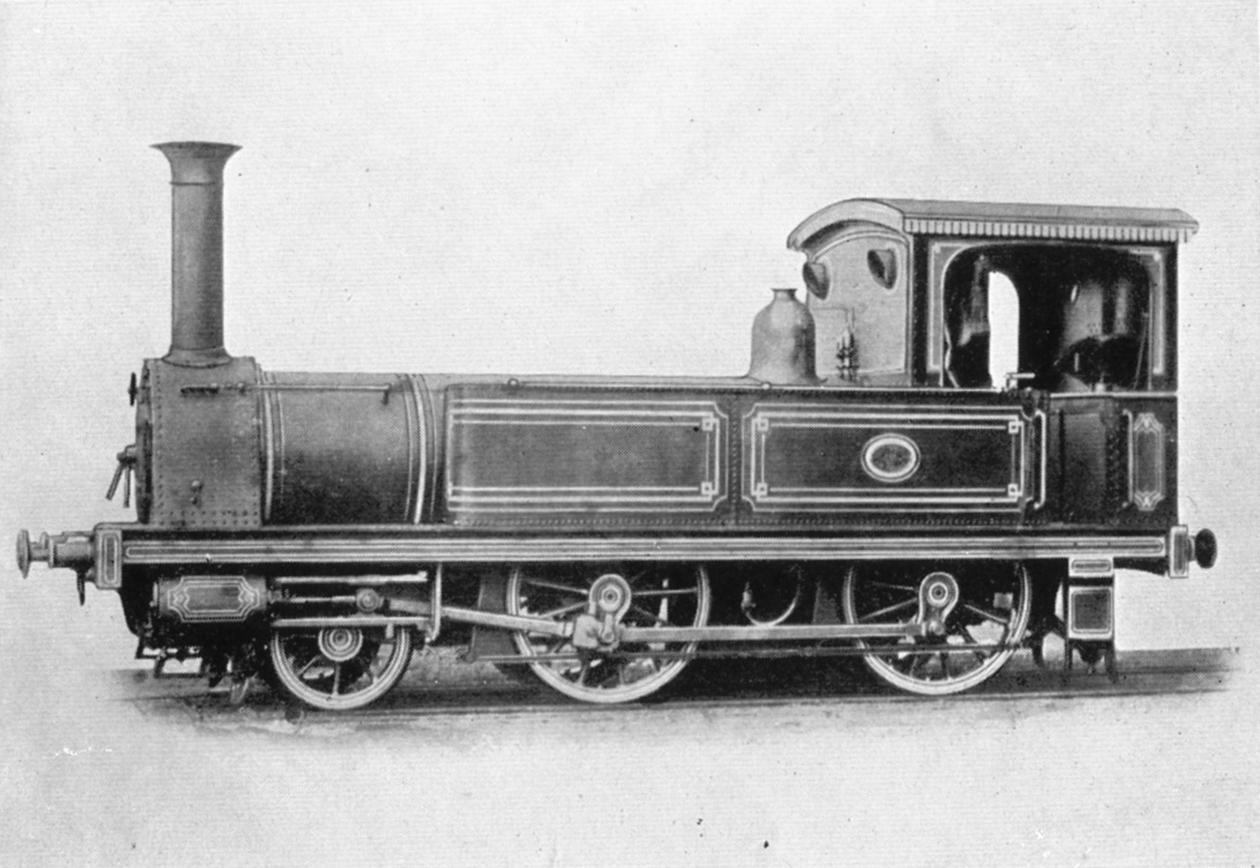
Class 150 steam locomotive made by Vulcan Foundry came to Japan in 1871. It is one of the steam locomotives which ran between Tokyo and Yokohama in 1872. This line was the first railway in Japan.

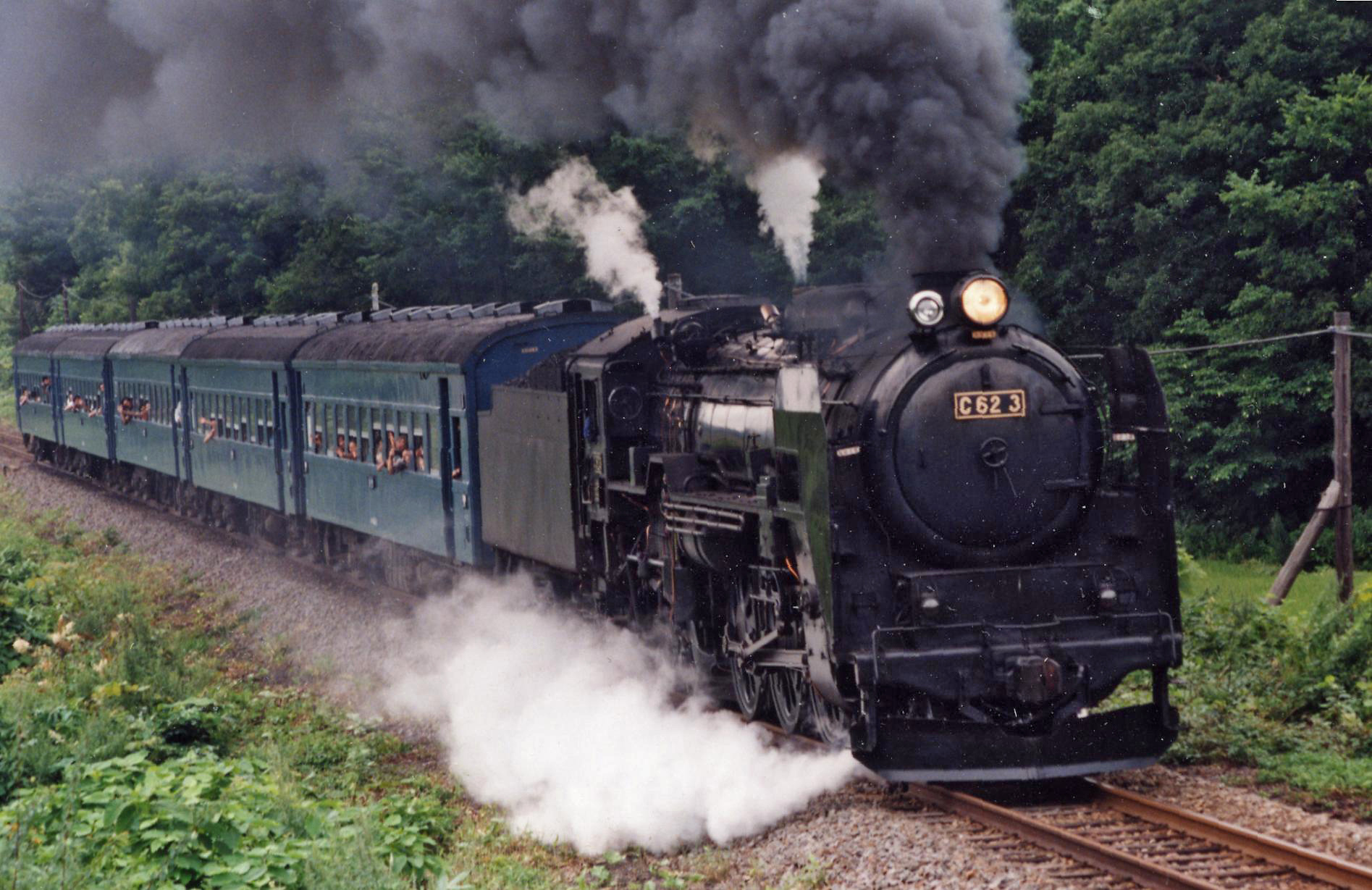
Steam excursion train Niseko hauled by a C62 locomotive on the Hakodate Main Line

Railways are the most important means of passenger transportation in Japan, maintaining this status since the late nineteenth century. Government policy promoted railways as an efficient transportation system for a country that lacks fossil fuels and is nearly completely dependent on imports.

Rural land near large cities was acquired cheaply by private railway companies from the late nineteenth century, which then built lines that became the backbone of urban transport between the suburbs and cities formed around the railway lines radiating out from metropolitan areas, similar to suburban growth around railways in other nations.

Despite this efficiency, growing affluence and associated car ownership led to road transportation usage increasing to the detriment of rail from the 1960s. The relative share of railways in total passenger kilometers fell from 66.7 percent in 1965 to 42 percent in 1978, and 29.8 percent in 1990, although this still accounted for the largest percentage of the OECD member countries.

The figure is 43.5% (as of 2001) in the largest metropolitan areas in Japan: Tokyo (including Chiba, Saitama, Tokyo, and Kanagawa Prefectures), Osaka (including Kyoto, Osaka, and Hyōgo Prefectures), and Nagoya. Private automobiles in Greater Tokyo account for less than 20% of daily trips as car ownership is restricted to those with a dedicated parking space.

=== Timeline ===
- 1872: Opening of Japan's first railway between Edo (Tokyo) and Yokohama by Masaru Inoue
- 1881: Foundation of Nippon Railway, Japan's first private railway company
- 1882: Opening of Horonai Railway, first railway in Hokkaido
- 1888: Opening of Iyo Railway, first railway in Shikoku
- 1889: Opening of Kyushu Railway, first railway in Kyushu
- 1889: Completion of the Tōkaidō Main Line
- 1893: Class 860 steam locomotive, first locomotive built in Japan
- 1895: Opening of Japan's first streetcar in Kyoto
- 1895: Japan's acquisition of railway in Taiwan
- 1899: Opening of Keijin Railway, first railway in Korea
- 1906: Opening of first railway in Karafuto
- 1906: Foundation of South Manchuria Railway
- 1906–1907: Nationalization of 17 private railways
- 1914: Opening of Tokyo Station
- 1925: Inauguration of the Yamanote Line
- 1927: Opening of Tokyo subway, the first subway in the East
- 1942: Opening of Kanmon Tunnel connecting Honshu and Kyushu
- 1945: End of World War II; railways were severely damaged
- 1949: At the behest of the Supreme Commander for the Allied Powers, Japanese Government Railways (JGR) was reorganized to become a state-owned public corporation named the Japanese National Railways (JNR)
- 1956: Completion of electrification of the Tōkaidō Main Line
- 1958: Kodama, the first EMU express between Tokyo and Osaka
- 1960: Hatsukari, the first DMU express between Ueno (Tokyo) and Aomori
- 1964: Opening of the first Shinkansen line between Tokyo and Shin-Osaka
- 1975: Retirement of steam locomotives from all JNR services (switchers remained until 1976)
- 1980: Enactment of JNR Reconstruction Act; low-profit lines were to be abandoned
- 1987: Privatization of the JNR; the Japan Railways Group companies succeeded the former JNR.
- 1988: Opening of Seikan Tunnel connecting Honshu and Hokkaido
- 1988: Opening of Great Seto Bridge connecting Honshu and Shikoku

== Classifications of rail transport in Japan ==
The COVID-19 pandemic in Japan abruptly reduced passenger railway ridership in 2020, which has been increasing since 1960.

=== Types of operators ===
==== JR ====
The Japan Railways Group, more commonly known as JR Group, is a group of successors of the government-owned Japanese National Railways (JNR). The JR Group lies at the heart of Japan's railway network, operating almost all intercity rail services and a large proportion of commuter rail services.

The six passenger operating companies of the JR Group are separated by region, but many operate long-distance train services beyond their regional boundaries. The six companies are: Hokkaido Railway Company, East Japan Railway Company, Central Japan Railway Company, West Japan Railway Company, Shikoku Railway Company, and Kyushu Railway Company.

Freight service belongs to Japan Freight Railway Company or JR Freight which operates all freight network previously owned by JNR.

==== Major private railways ====
Japan also features multiple competing private railway systems. In post-war Japan, the Japanese government encouraged private corporations to develop their own mass transit systems in order to quickly rebuild the country's urban transport networks.

Private rail lines were encouraged to compete with each other as well as the national rail lines with the government's role limited to regulation of fares. In exchange for developing rail lines, private corporations were given business opportunities to diversify their operations and develop the real estate surrounding their railway networks.

By allowing private corporations to control transit oriented developments as well as railway lines, planned communities were facilitated allowing private railway operators to establish a vertically integrated business of developing residential, business, industrial and retail land and the commuting methods used by the populace to travel between such areas.

As such, through diversification of their business, the majority of the private railways in Japan are financially independent and their railway operations are usually profitable, in sharp contrast to most transit networks in other countries.

The Japan Private Railway Association classifies the following 16 companies as the major private railways of Japan. These companies, in total, operate 2,870.1 kilometers of rail. In a one-year period from April 2009, a total of 9.46 billion passengers (118 billion passenger kilometers) traveled by means of these major railways.

- Tobu Railway
- Seibu Railway
- Keisei Electric Railway
- Keio Corporation
- Odakyu Electric Railway
- Tokyu Corporation
- Keikyu Corporation
- Tokyo Metro
- Sotetsu
- Meitetsu
- Kintetsu Railway
- Nankai Electric Railway
- Keihan Electric Railway
- Hankyu Corporation
- Hanshin Electric Railway
- Nishitetsu

==== Other railways ====
Other railway operators include:

- City governments (municipal transportation bureaus)
- "Third-sector railway" companies funded jointly by regional governments and private companies
- Other minor private railway companies

=== Railway and tram ===
In the legal sense, there are two types (with several subcategories) of rail transportation systems in Japan: railway (鉄道, tetsudō) and tramway (軌道, kidō). Every public rail transportation system under government regulation in Japan is classified either as railway or tramway. In principle, tramways can have sections shared with road traffic while railways cannot, but the choice may seem rather arbitrary in certain cases. For example, Osaka Metro is a tram system while subways in other cities are railways.

Railways and trams are respectively regulated by the Railway Business Act (鉄道事業法, Tetsudō Jigyō Hō; Act No. 92 of 1986) and the Tram Act (軌道法, Kidō Hō; Act No. 76 of 1921).

=== Categories of railway ===
Under the Railway Business Act, operations of "railways" (in the legal meaning) are divided into three categories, defined as follows:

- Category 1 Railway Business (第一種鉄道事業, Dai-isshu Tetsudō Jigyō): Operating passenger or freight railway services (except tramways) on one's own railway.
- Category 2 Railway Business (第二種鉄道事業, Dai-ni-shu Tetsudō Jigyō): Operating passenger or freight services on railway infrastructure operated/constructed by another railway business.
- Category 3 Railway Business (第三種鉄道事業, Dai-san-shu Tetsudō Jigyō): Constructing railway infrastructure for use by a Category 1 or Category 2 railway business.

Most railway operations in Japan are Category 1. Examples of Category 2 railway businesses include most operations of Japan Freight Railway Company (JR Freight) and the JR Tōzai Line operation of West Japan Railway Company (JR West).

Examples of Category 3 railway businesses include Kōbe Rapid Transit Railway and the government of Aomori Prefecture with regards to Aoimori Railway.

== Common features of Japanese railways ==
=== Gauge ===
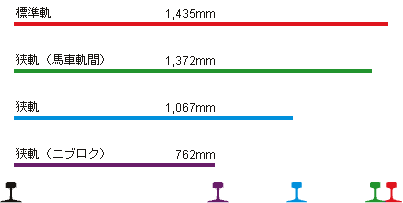
Comparison of track gauges in Japan

The national railway network was started and has been expanded with 1,067 mm (3 ft 6 in) narrow gauge track. Railways with broader gauge are limited to those built not intending to provide through freight and passenger transport with the existing national network. The Shinkansen network uses standard gauge. The rail system of Japan consists of the following (as of 2009):

- 22,301 km (13,857 mi) of 1,067 mm (3 ft 6 in) narrow gauge, of which 15,222 kilometres (9,459 mi) are electrified. Used mainly for general passenger and freight lines. See: 1067 mm gauge railways in Japan.
- 4,251 km (2,641 mi) of 1,435 mm (4 ft 8 1/2 in) standard gauge, all electrified. Used for the Shinkansen high-speed network, various subway lines, some suburban rail lines (including the majority of private railways in the Kansai region), and a number of tram (streetcar) lines. See: Standard-gauge railways in Japan.
- 96 km (60 mi) of 1,372 mm (4 ft 6 in) Scotch gauge, all electrified. Used for the Keiō Line and the Toei Shinjuku Line, the two remaining tram (streetcar) systems in Tokyo (Toden Arakawa Line and the Setagaya Line), and the Hakodate City Tram. See: 1372 mm gauge railways in Japan.
- 48 km (30 mi) of 762 mm (2 ft 6 in) narrow gauge, all electrified, mostly regional. See: 762 mm gauge railways in Japan.

=== Railway speeds ===
Excluding the Shinkansen, even with Automatic Train Control cab signalling, most Japanese trains are limited to a maximum speed of 130 km/h (81 mph), which restricts the viability of longer-distance routes. This is due to legislation restricting emergency stopping distances of trains to 600 m (2,000 ft) on a railway with grade crossings. Grade separated railways, without grade crossings, are not subject to such legislation. Both the Keisei Narita Airport Line, and formerly the Hokuhoku Line, being grade separated, currently operate or operated at a posted speed limit of 160 km/h (99 mph), the latter being the fastest narrow-gauge line in Japan.

Due to the tight and twisty nature of Japanese narrow-gauge railways, many intercity/limited express services also extensively utilise tilting trains, which shorten travel time by enabling a train to corner faster. Kamome (883 series and 885 series), Azusa (E353 series), Shinano (383 series) and Ōzora (261 and KiHa 283 series) are some examples of limited express services ran by tilting trains.

=== Electrification ===
JR Group railroads use 1,500 V DC and 20 kV AC electrification systems for conventional lines, and 25 kV AC for Shinkansen. Like all of Japan, the frequency of AC power supply is 50 Hz in eastern Japan and 60 Hz in western Japan.

Electrification with 600 V DC and 750 V DC is also seen in private lines.

=== Loading gauge ===
Japanese national network operated by Japan Railways Group employs narrow gauge 1,067 mm (3 ft 6 in) and has maximum width of 3,000 mm (9 ft 10 in) and maximum height of 4,100 mm (13 ft 5 in); however, a number JR lines were constructed as private railways prior to nationalisation in the early 20th century, and feature loading gauges smaller than the standard. These include the Chūō Main Line west of Takao, the Minobu Line, and the Yosan Main Line west of Kan'onji (3,900 mm (12 ft 10 in) height). Nevertheless, advances in pantograph technology have largely eliminated the need for separate rolling stock in these areas.

There are many private railway companies in Japan and the loading gauge is different for each company.

=== Proposed railway links to adjacent countries ===
- Russia: proposed fixed link, break-of-gauge 1,435 mm (4 ft 8 1/2 in)/1,520 mm (4 ft 11 27/32 in) (with 25 kV 50 Hz AC) in the northern Hokkaido (see Sakhalin-Hokkaido Tunnel).
- China: proposed train ferries from Hakata to Shanghai, and from Shimonoseki to Dalian (both with 1,435 mm (4 ft 8 1/2 in) on board).
- South Korea: proposed train ferry from Sasebo to Busan (with 1,435 mm (4 ft 8 1/2 in) on board).

=== Tickets, fare and surcharges ===
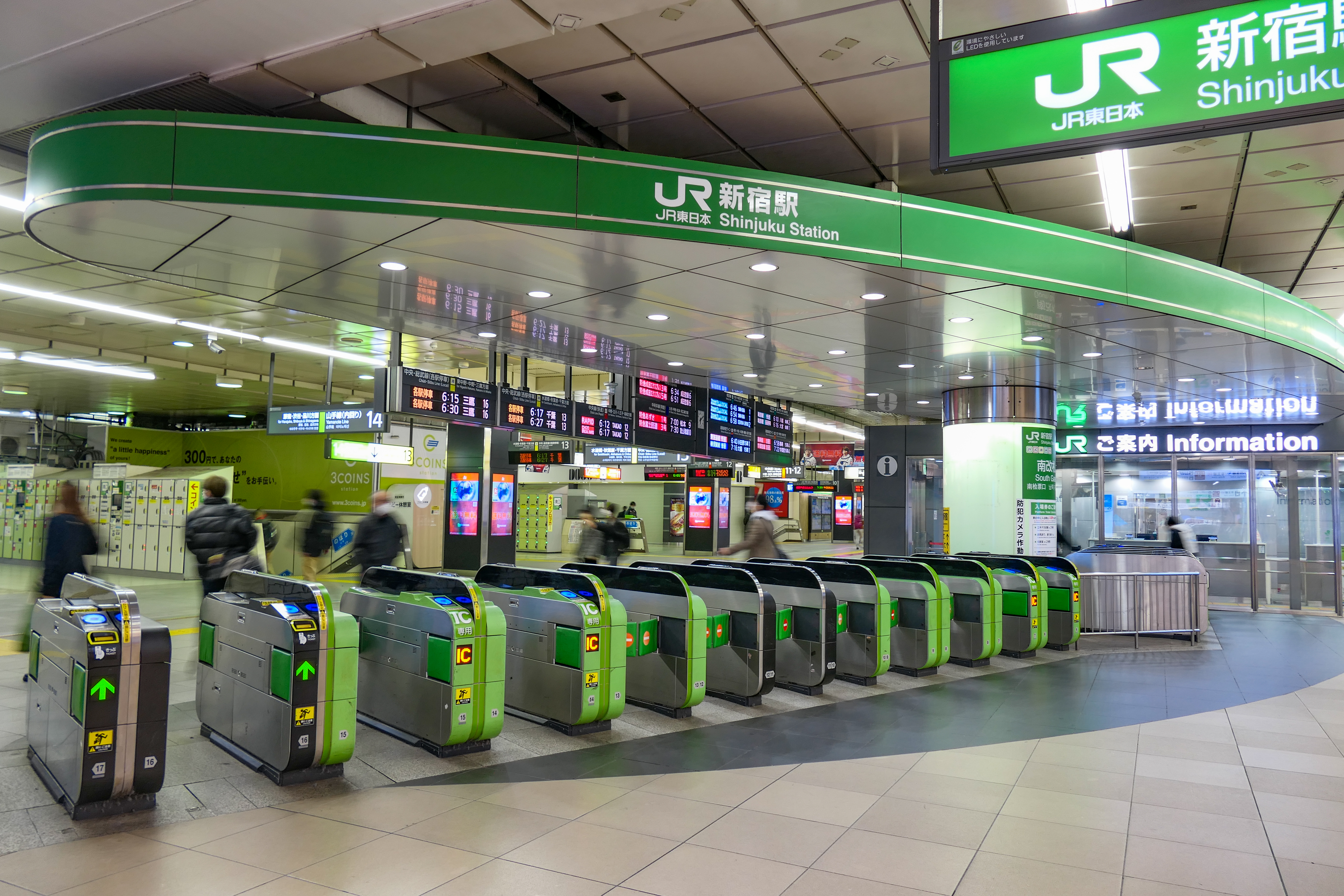
Ticket barriers at Shinjuku Station

Rail transport in Japan is usually for a fee. In principle a fare is pre-charged and a ticket is issued in exchange for a payment of fare. A ticket is inspected at a staffed or automated gate in the station where a travel starts and is collected at the station where the travel ends.

A ticket required for a travel by railway is called a fare ticket (乗車券, jōshaken), the price of which is fare (運賃, unchin). The fare ticket is valid regardless of number of transfers. Long-distance travellers (usually longer than 101 km (63 mi)) are allowed unlimited number of stopovers (途中下車, tochū-gesha) along the route subject to the duration of the validity of the fare ticket. In addition, a ride on a specific train and/or coach may require a surcharge ticket (料金券, ryōkinken).

Except for very short railways and some tram systems with a flat fare, fare varies by distances or number of zones travelled. The pricing based on the time of travel (peak or off-peak) is not common in Japan. The children's fare (小児運賃, shōni-unchin) for children between 6 and 12 is half of the adult fare.

For subway systems in major cities, operators commonly sell one-day or 24 hour passes, which allow for unlimited rides on that subway line for one day, or 24 hours from purchase (depending on the type of ticket).

Stored-value card systems, often referred to as IC cards, are shared by multiple operators in large cities, such as Suica, Pasmo and PiTaPa, by which passengers can avoid consultation with complicated fare tables and lineups for ticket machines before each train ride. Reciprocal agreements allow the cards from many cities to be used elsewhere.

There are many types of surcharges. For example, in JR, surcharges include:

- Express fee (急行料金, kyūkō ryōkin) for travel on an "express train"
- Limited express fee (特急料金, tokkyū ryōkin) for travel on a reserved seat of a "limited express train"
- Non-reserved limited express fee (自由席特急料金, jiyūseki tokkyū ryōkin) for travel on a non-reserved seat of a "limited express train"
- Reserved seat fee (指定席料金, shiteiseki ryōkin) for travel on a reserved seat of trains except for a "limited express train"
- Green fee (グリーン料金, gurīn ryōkin) for travel on a special coach called "Green Car"
- Bed fee (寝台料金, shindai ryōkin) for travel on a sleeping car

An unusual feature of Japanese surcharges, compared with other train systems, is that they often require a separate ticket. Thus, if riding the shinkansen, for instance, rather than purchasing a single shinkansen ticket, one purchases two tickets: a fare ticket (乗車券) for the distance traveled, and an additional shinkansen ticket (新幹線特急券, shinkansen tokkyūken; shinkansen special express ticket) to allow one to ride the shinkansen for that distance, rather than ordinary trains. At most stations, shinkansen services depart from dedicated tracks which are behind a second set of ticket gates, which verify that the super express ticket is held. Manual inspection of tickets can also be performed by a conductor, and express tickets can be purchased from the conductor. IC cards normally can be used for the basic fare but not the surcharge, which must be paid some other way such as via a paper ticket.

=== Types and names of trains ===
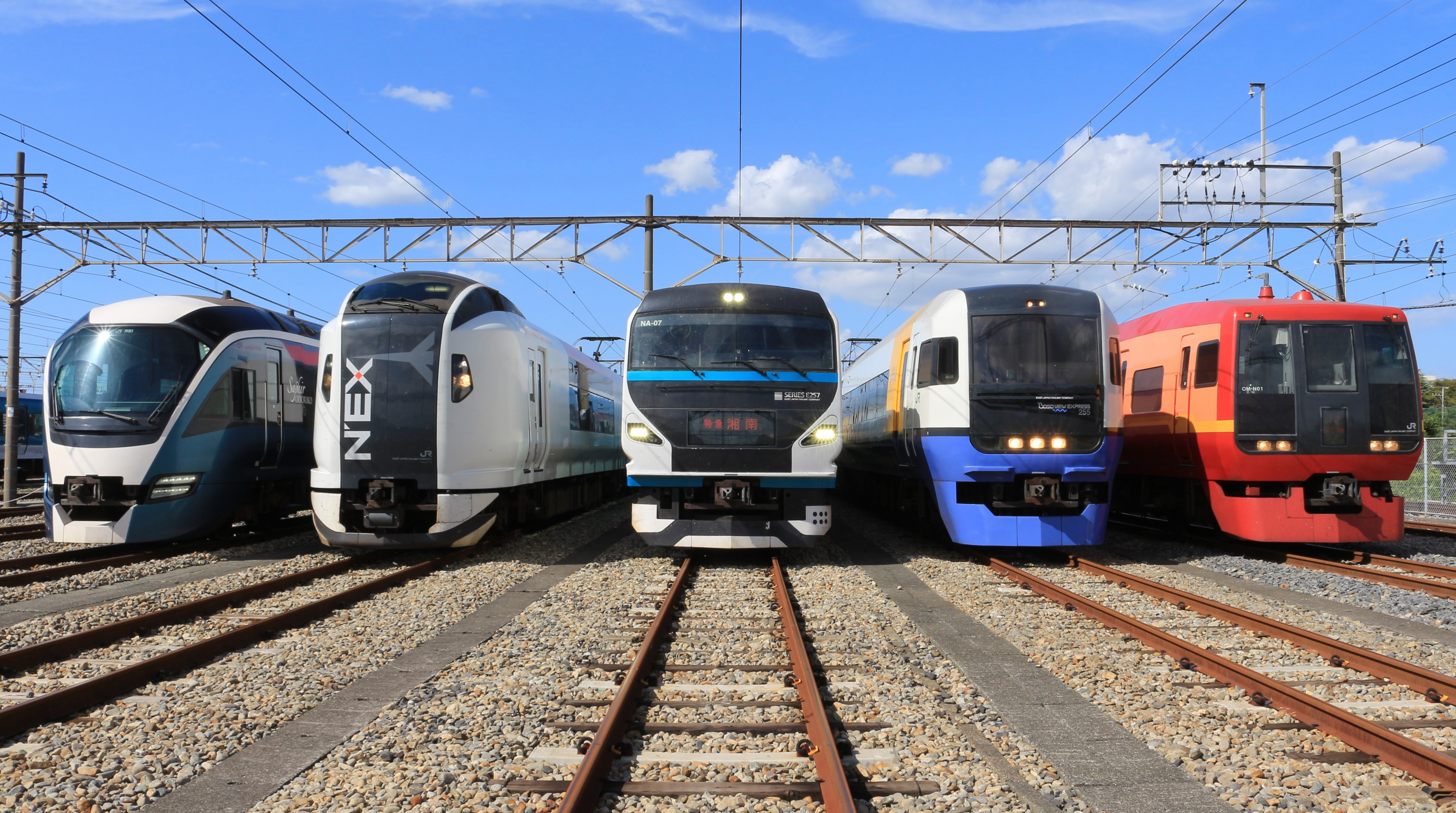
JRE Limited Express trains

Suburban or intercity railway lines usually set several types of trains (列車種別, ressha shubetsu) with different stop patterns.

A train that stops at every station is called a local train (普通列車/各駅停車, futsū-ressha/kakueki-teisha). Only a fare ticket is required to ride local trains. Trains that stop at fewer stations and are therefore faster than local trains are classified as Rapid (快速, kaisoku), Express (急行, kyūkō), Limited Express (特急, tokkyū), etc. and may require surcharges depending on company policies. Railways with many types of trains use prefixes like "semi-", "rapid-", "section-", or "commuter-". For example, the Tōbu Isesaki Line has Local, Section Semi-Express, Semi-Express, Section Express, Express, Rapid, Section Rapid, and Limited Express.

Train operators usually name long-distance trains (Kintetsu is a rare exception of this practice). The process of ticket reservation utilizes the train names instead of the train numbers. Train numbers are almost exclusively for professional use.

=== Railway lines ===
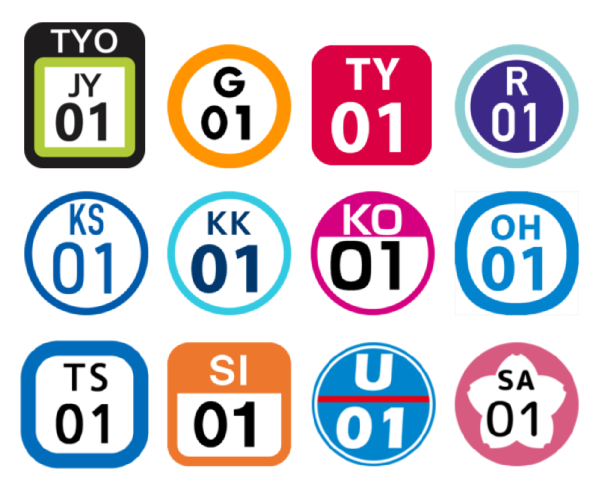
Railway lines have adopted station numbering in preparation for Tokyo 2020, making it easier for tourists to distinguish the stations. Station numbering was previously exclusive to subway lines.

All the railway and tram lines in Japan are named by the operators. In principle (with some exceptions), a section of railway has only one name. Line names are shown on a ticket to indicate the route of the ticket. Passengers refer the railway by the name of line (e.g. "Tōyoko Line") or the name of operator (e.g. "Hanshin").

The line names may come from a name of destination or a city along the line (e.g. the "Takasaki Line" goes to Takasaki, Gunma); a name of region (e.g. the "Tōhoku Main Line" goes through the Tōhoku region); an abbreviation of provinces or cities (e.g. the "Gonō Line" connects Goshogawara and Noshiro); or a course of the line (e.g. the "Tōzai Line" means the East-West Line).

Line names were used as a basis for the division and privatization of Japanese National Railways in the 1980s. The railway business was evaluated line-by-line in order to identify significantly unprofitable lines for closure. This left some unnamed branch lines, which would have been closed if they had line names, unaffected by the restructure.

In some cases the current route of a railway has changed but the historic line name has not reflected the change, in which case the operational name will be different from the original line name. Examples include the Keihin-Tōhoku Line and the Shōnan-Shinjuku Line.

== Subways and light rail transit ==
Tokyo subway map

In addition to its extensive railway network, Japan has a large number of subway systems. The largest is the Tokyo subway, where the network in 1989 consisted of 211 kilometers of track serving 205 stations. Two subway systems serve the capital: one run by the Tokyo Metro (named Teito Rapid Transit Authority until 2004), with nine lines (the oldest, Ginza line was built in 1927), and the other operated by the Tokyo metropolitan government's Transportation Bureau (Toei), with four lines. Outlying and suburban areas are served by seven private railway companies, whose lines intersect at major stations with the subway system. More than sixty additional kilometers of subway were under construction in 1990 by the two companies.

There are a number of other metro systems in other Japanese cities, including the Fukuoka City Subway, Kobe Municipal Subway, Kyoto Municipal Subway, Osaka Metro, Nagoya Subway, Sapporo Subway, Sendai Subway and Yokohama Subway.

While metro systems in Japanese cities are usually operated by the city government and therefore tend to limit their networks within the city border, there are many cases of through services using subway trains on suburban railway lines and vice versa. One of the reasons for this situation was the sharp increase of ridership on the railways in the rapid growth of the postwar economy that could not be handled by small original railway terminals in the city center.

Automated guideway transit (rubber-tired motor cars running on concrete guideways) has also developed in Japan. Cities with such intermediate capacity transit systems include Hiroshima, Kobe, Osaka, Saitama and Tokyo.

Some cities operate streetcar systems, including Hiroshima, Matsuyama, Nagasaki, Tokyo (one line only) and Toyohashi. All of these cities are also well served by public and private railroads; also, there are private tramways not included above.

== In Japanese culture ==
=== Punctuality ===
Japanese railways are among the most punctual in the world. The average delay on the Tokaido Shinkansen in fiscal 2018 was 0.7 minutes. When trains are delayed for five minutes, the conductor makes an announcement apologizing for the delay and the railway company may provide a "delay certificate" (遅延証明書). Japanese passengers rely heavily on rail transit and take it for granted that trains operate on time. When trains are delayed for an hour or more, it may even appear in the newspaper. However, some argue that railway staff are under too much pressure from the public.

=== Trains and crime ===
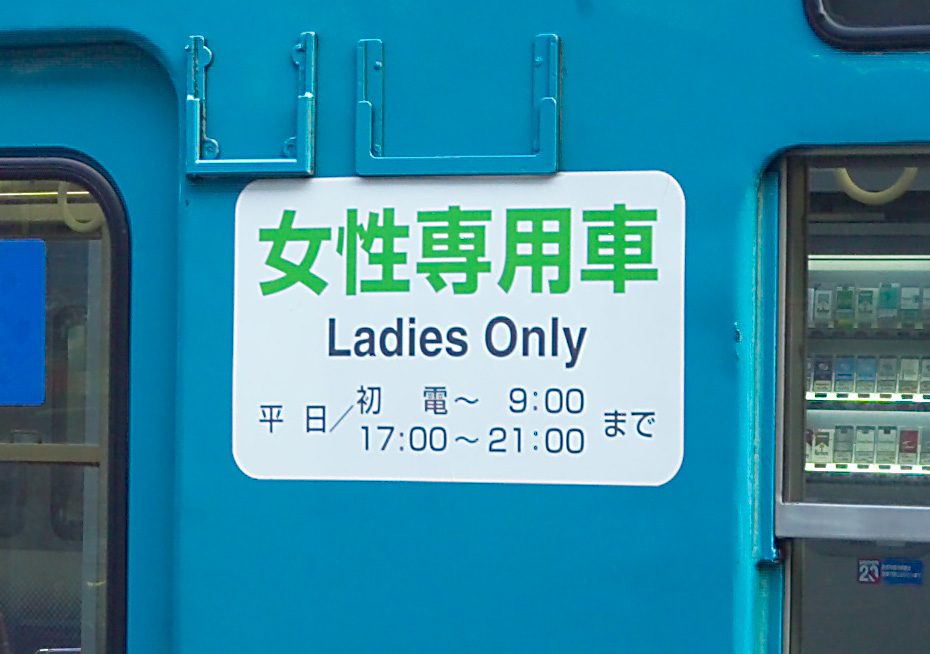
Ladies-only car on JR West

One of the most widely publicized crimes committed on trains is chikan or groping, taking advantage of overcrowded cars and a reluctance for people to ask for help, or to jump to the aid of another. A recent trend for railway companies to promote their lines is to service female-only cars on some trains (typically during morning rush-hours and late night trains, and often the front or back car) and is quickly becoming a standard practice, especially among Tokyo's busy commuter lines.

The Japanese language has a number of expressions for fare evasion. One is Satsuma-no-kami. It is a reference to Taira Satsuma-no-kami Tadanori, a member of the Taira clan who is mentioned in the Tale of the Heike. His name, Tadanori, is pronounced the same as words meaning "riding for free".

Another expression is kiseru jōsha. This refers to a kiseru, a smoking pipe that has a long hollow section made of bamboo between the bowl (where the smoke enters) and the mouthpiece (where it leaves) made of metal. Based on an association of metal and money, kiseru jōsha is the practice of using one ticket to enter the train system and a different ticket to exit, with a long unpaid segment in the middle – purchasing two separate tickets, covering just the initial and final segments of the journey (corresponding to the bowl and mouthpiece), rather than one ticket for the whole length.

Other notable crimes staged in railway facilities in Japan include the assassination of the Prime Minister Hara Takashi in Tokyo Station in 1921, the deliberate train wreck at Mitaka Station in 1949 and the Sarin gas attack on the Tokyo subway in 1995.

=== Suicides ===
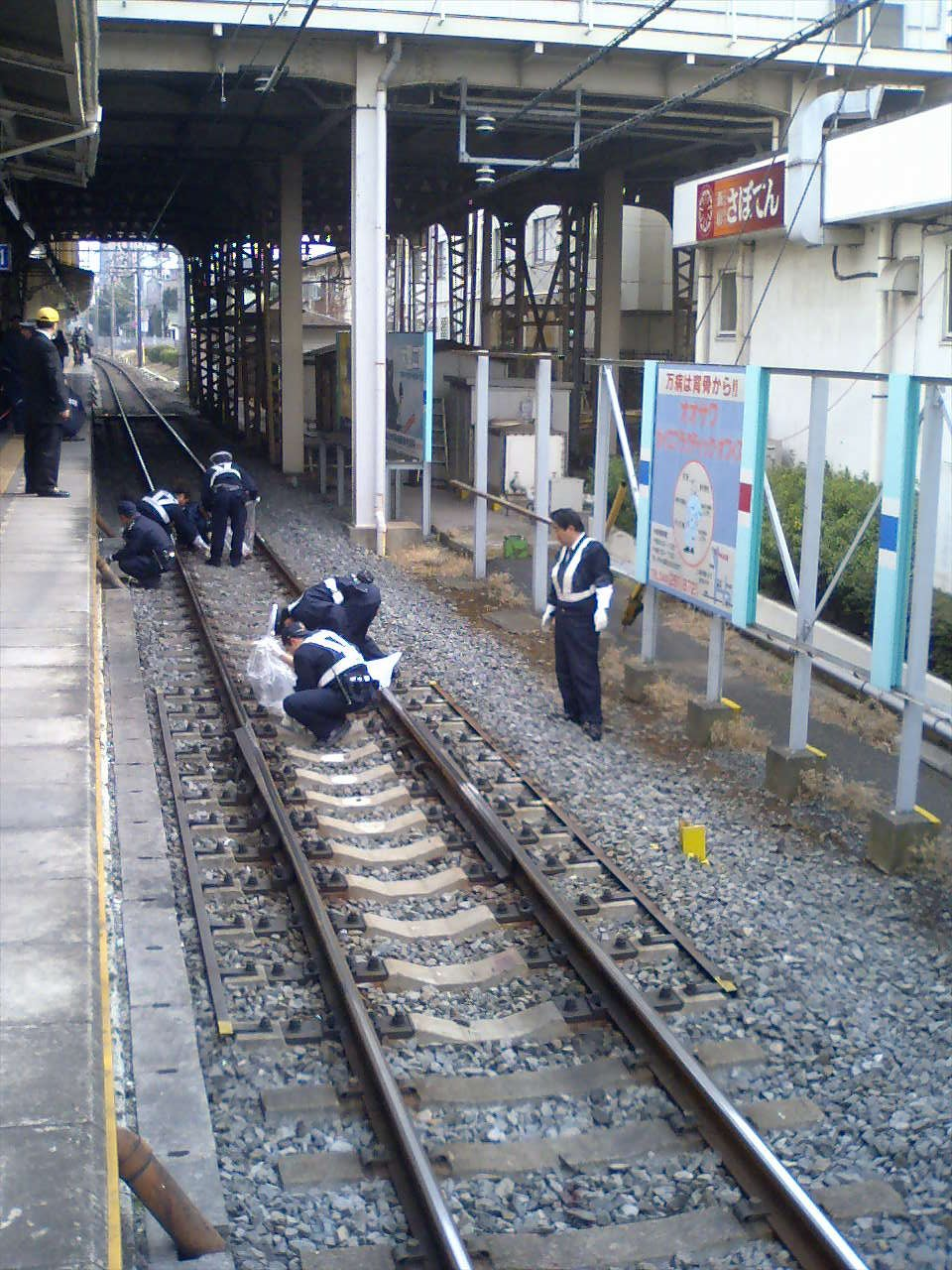
Police officers investigate a suicide in Saitama Prefecture, February 2006

Trains are also used as a means to commit suicide. Its relative popularity is partly due to its practical ease, and to avoid causing a nuisance to one's family, although families are often charged or sued by the railway companies to compensate for the trouble caused by the accident. Suicides often cause delays on the lines on which they occur. The deceased's family may be charged damages on the order of approximately 1 million yen by railway operating companies. Railroad operators have taken steps to discourage and prevent suicides. This includes use of blue LED lights in stations, which officials hope will calm potential jumpers. Platform edge doors are also being installed at numerous stations in an effort to keep people contained on the platform until the train arrives.

=== Ekiben ===
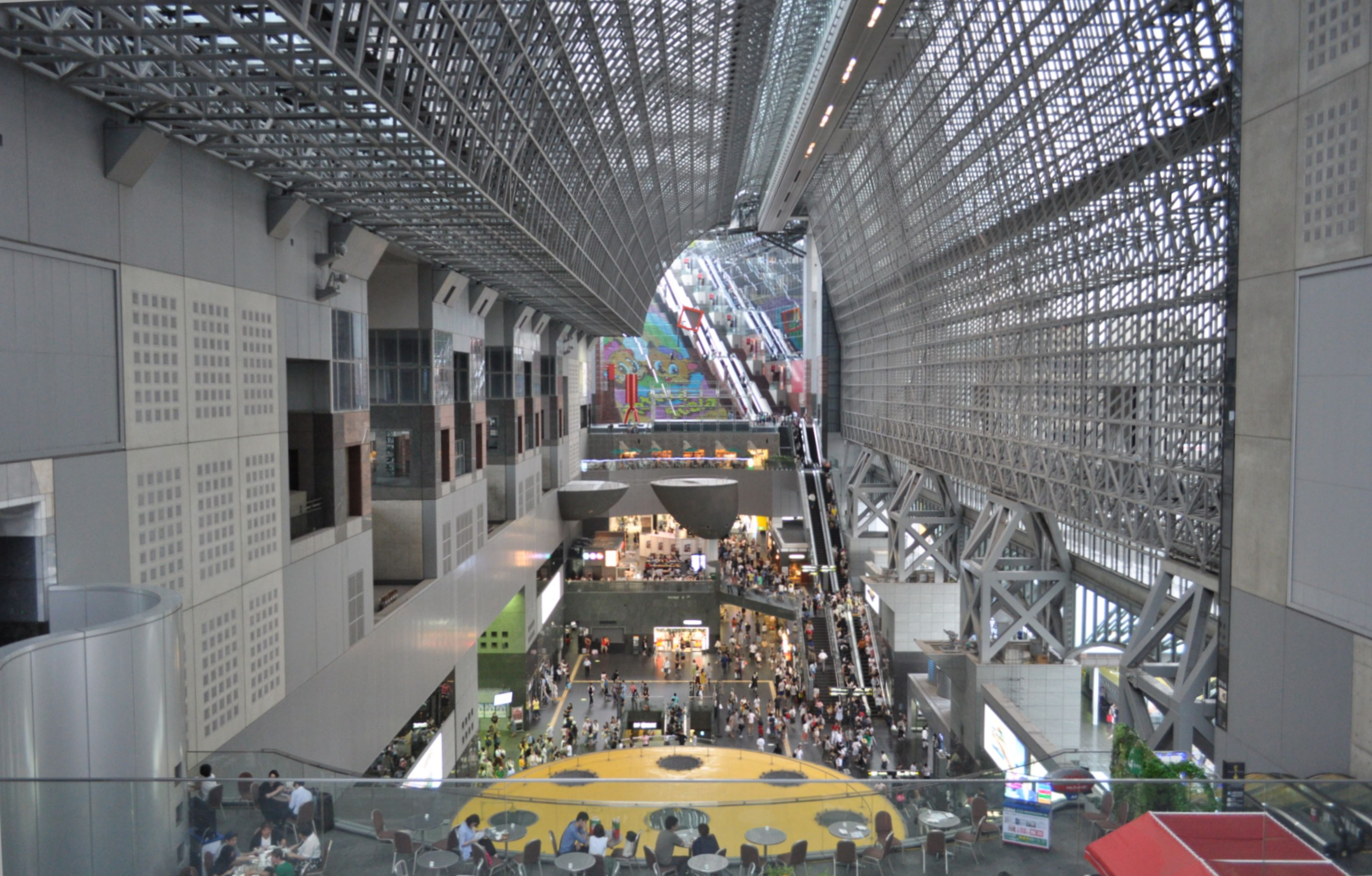
Shoppers, travelers, and hotel guests share Kyoto Station

An important aspect of the romance of the rails in Japan is the ekiben, the station bento lunchbox. The first pre-packed station lunchboxes originated at Utsunomiya Station in 1885 and became an instant success. Many stations (eki) around the country soon began to make special bento featuring local specialties such as seafood, meat or vegetables. Including generous portions of rice, the ekiben was a complete meal. It was often served in a wooden box; nowadays cardboard and plastics have become popular, although wooden chopsticks still accompany the ekiben. The Central Committee of the Japanese Association of Railroad Station Concessionaires (社団法人日本鉄道構内営業中央会) is a prominent trade organization promoting ekiben.

=== Sightseeing trains ===
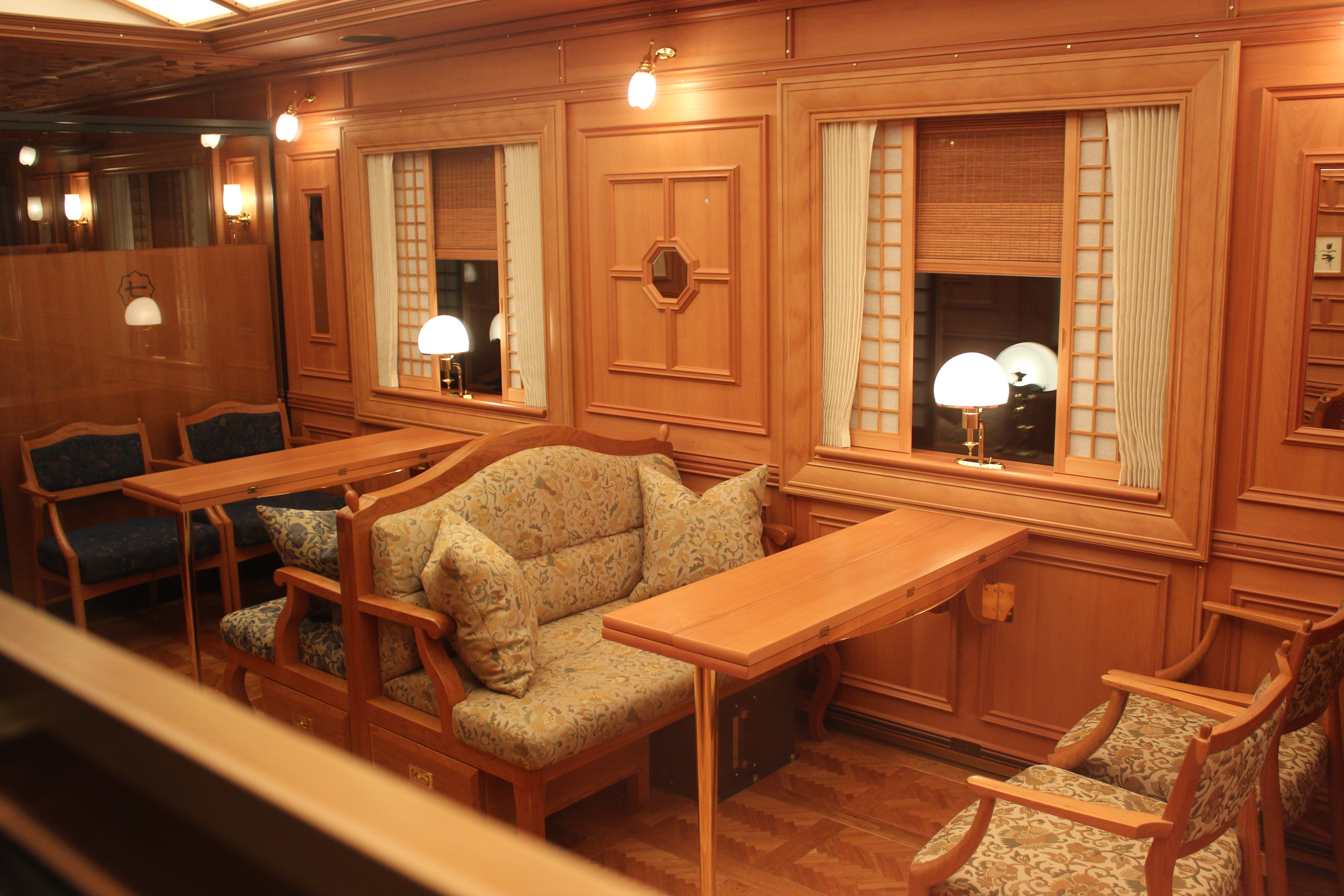
Seven Stars in Kyushu

A wide variety of sightseeing trains operate in Japan, including collaborations with popular anime franchises such as Hello Kitty, Neon Genesis Evangelion, and Demon Slayer: Kimetsu no Yaiba.

After the privatization and breakup of Japanese National Railways (JNR) in 1987, which led to the formation of the Japan Railways Group (JR Group), the number of specially designed sightseeing trains known as Joyful Train increased on many lines.

Since the 2000s, prolonged economic stagnation in Japan has led consumers to become more selective about high-cost spending, shifting their focus from material goods to experiential consumption. In response to this trend, the number of sightseeing trains operating across the country has increased. During the 2010s, several significantly more luxurious sleeper trains were introduced and attracted considerable popularity, including the Seven Stars in Kyushu, Train Suite Shiki-shima, and Twilight Express Mizukaze.

=== In media ===
Japanese books and television feature rail transport in various contexts. Examples include travelogues visiting rustic routes or unusual trains, such as the popular Sci-Fi franchise Galaxy Express 999 or murder mysteries on sleeper trains.

A major television series based on rail transport, Ressha Sentai ToQger, was broadcast on TV Asahi from 2014 to 2015.

Densha de Go! is a series of Japanese train simulators.

== See also ==
- List of urban rail systems in Japan
- List of railway companies in Japan
- List of railway lines in Japan
- List of railway stations in Japan
- List of railway electrification systems in Japan
- Japanese railway signals
- Monorails in Japan
- List of defunct railway companies in Japan
- Transport in Japan
