= Delay certificate =

Proof of a train service running late

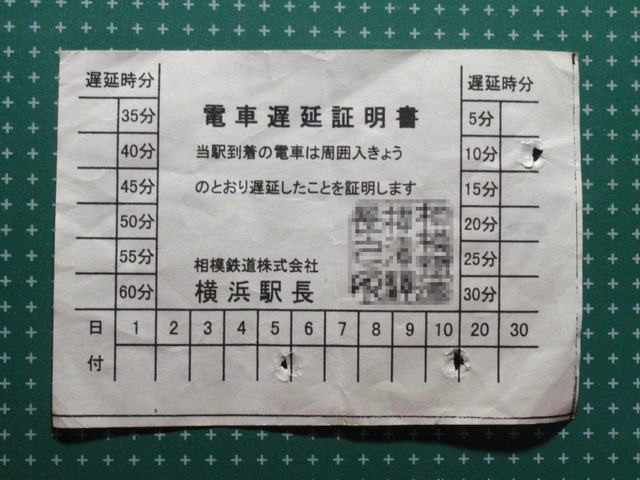
Example of a delay certificate issued by a Japanese railway (Sagami Railway Yokohama station).

A delay certificate (Japanese: 遅延証明書, Hepburn: chien shōmei sho) is a document issued by a railway company to certify that a scheduled passenger train arrived at a station later than what is stipulated in the company's scheduled timetable. It is provided to passengers affected by the delay, who can then produce it to their superiors at school or work and is considered as a valid reason for reporting late.

This practice is most prevalent in private and public Japanese railway companies, and has been emulated by a number of rail transport operators in other countries. In addition, a few bus companies in Japan have also adopted this practice.

== In Japan ==
Certificates are issued when delays as little as five minutes occur, and even for instances where the delay is caused by circumstances beyond the railway company's control, such as foul weather or rail suicide. These come in the form of handwritten certificates or printouts given out (generally in 10 × 15 cm strips) by conductors or station staff.

Major Japanese railway companies such as JR East, Tokyu Corporation and Tokyo Metro have introduced electronic versions of the delay certificates on their websites, which would remain there for a week or less. Affected passengers who were unable to or did not collect the certificate could alternatively access and download it into their mobile phones or computers, and print them out if necessary.

== In other countries ==
=== France ===
Paris' RATP issues delay certificates under the name bulletin de retard, for any delays greater than 15 minutes. They can be used, for example, for late admission at university exams.

=== Germany ===
Germany's Deutsche Bahn issues delay certificates known as Bescheinigung über Zugverspätung, "certificate about train delay".

=== Malaysia ===
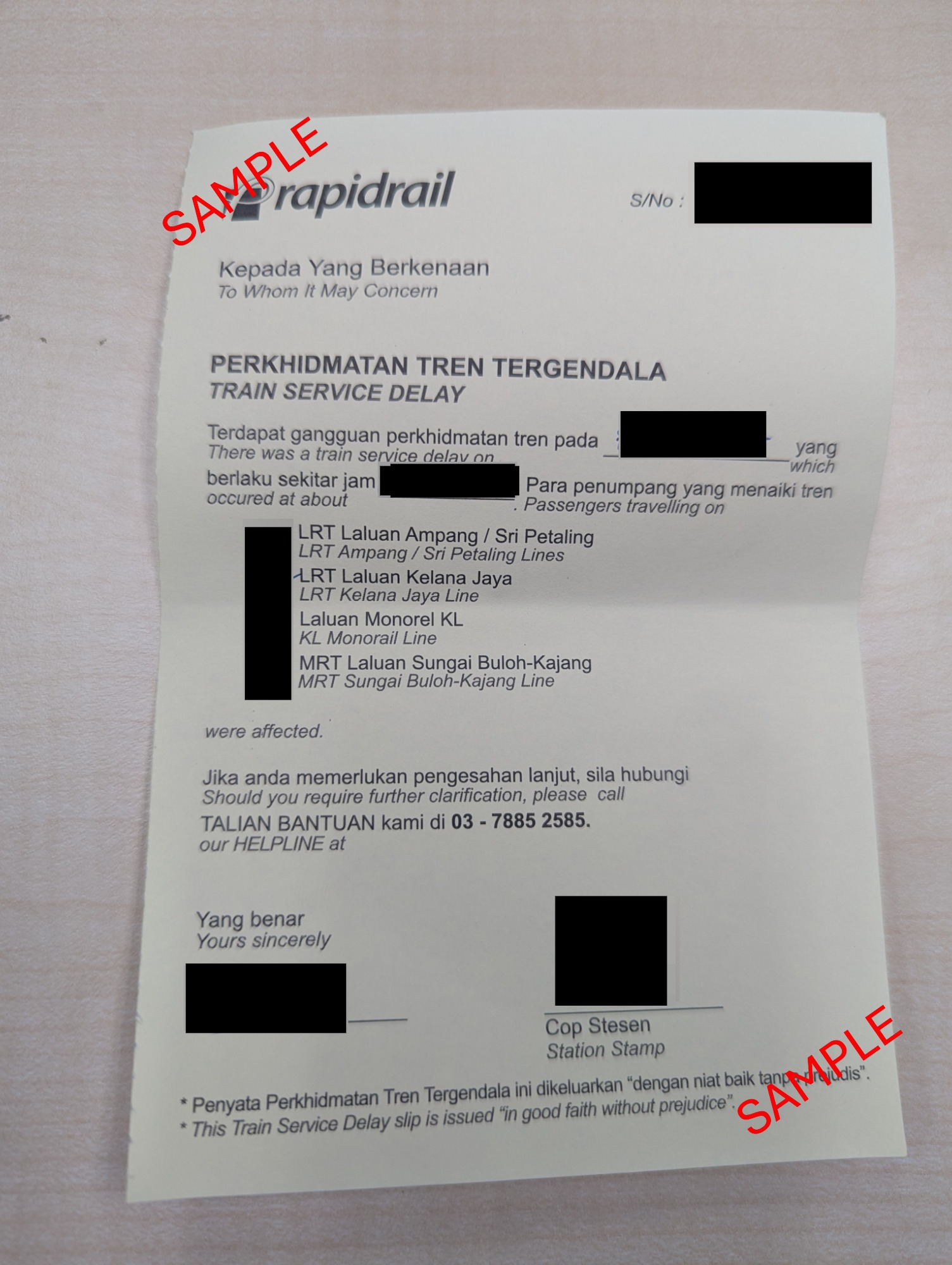
Example of a delay certificate or 'late slip' issued by Malaysia's Rapid Rail, in English and Malay.

Malaysia's Rapid Rail, which operates the MRT, LRT and monorail in the Klang Valley issues such delay certificates or 'late slip' upon request at their counters if the service delay is due to the operator's fault.

=== Singapore ===
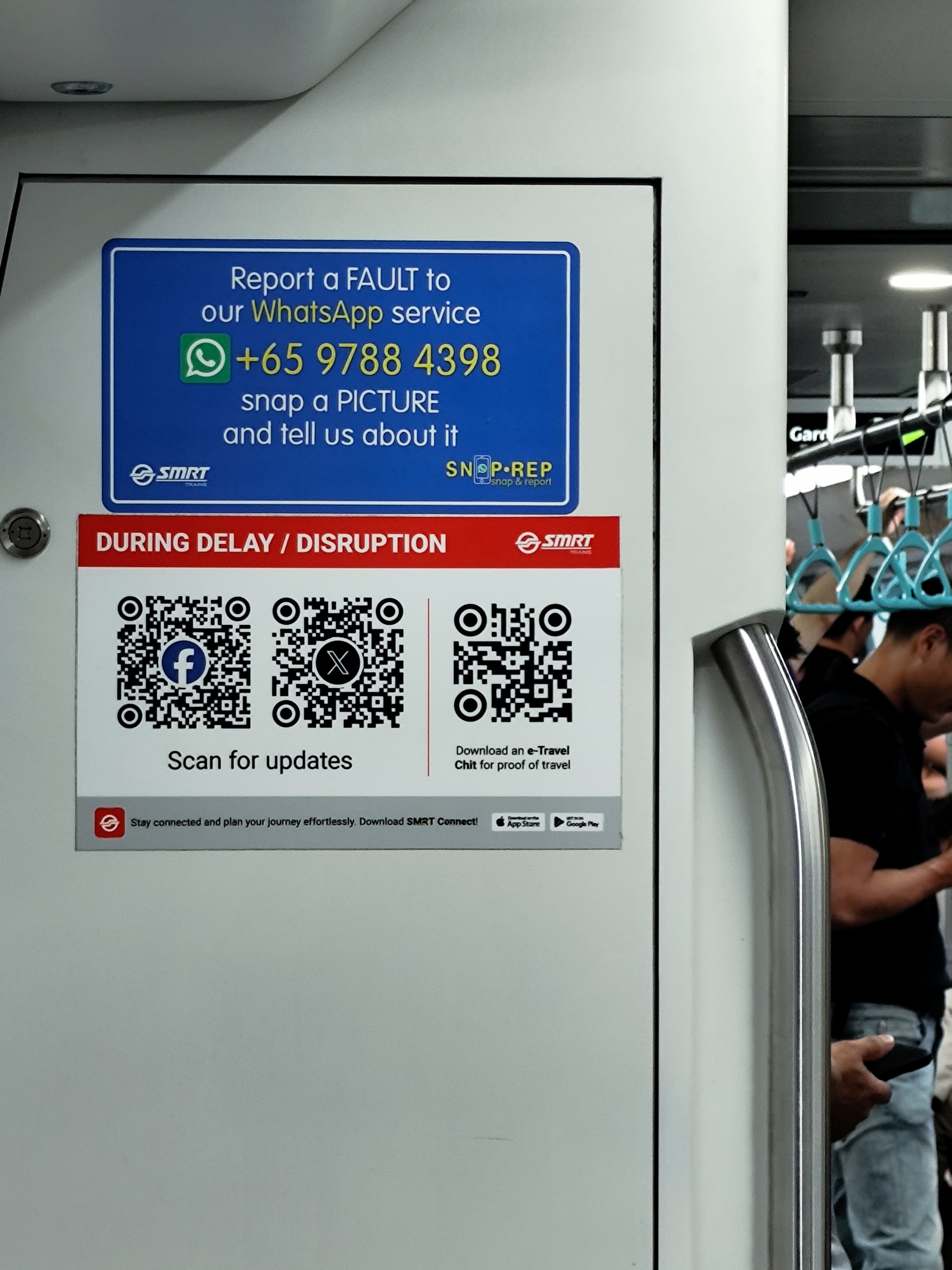
An informational notice poster for information and electronic travel chit during event of a disruption or delay, in an SMRT Trains operated metro train serving the East-West MRT line in Singapore.

Operators of Singapore's Mass Rapid Transit system generally provide travel chits that testifies the commute of the bearer over the affected stretch of the rail network during an event of a delay or disruption. Such travel chits are officially recognised for late admission to all national examinations, such as the Primary School Leaving Examination. Paper chits are distributed by transport operator staff at transit stations during disruptions. Alternatively, electronic travel chits ("e-travel chit") can be obtained from a web service for part of the rail network operated by SMRT Trains, which utilises the geolocation of the user's mobile device to verify that they are affected by the disruption.
