= Nagasaki Electric Tramway Sakuramachi Line =

Sakuramachi Line
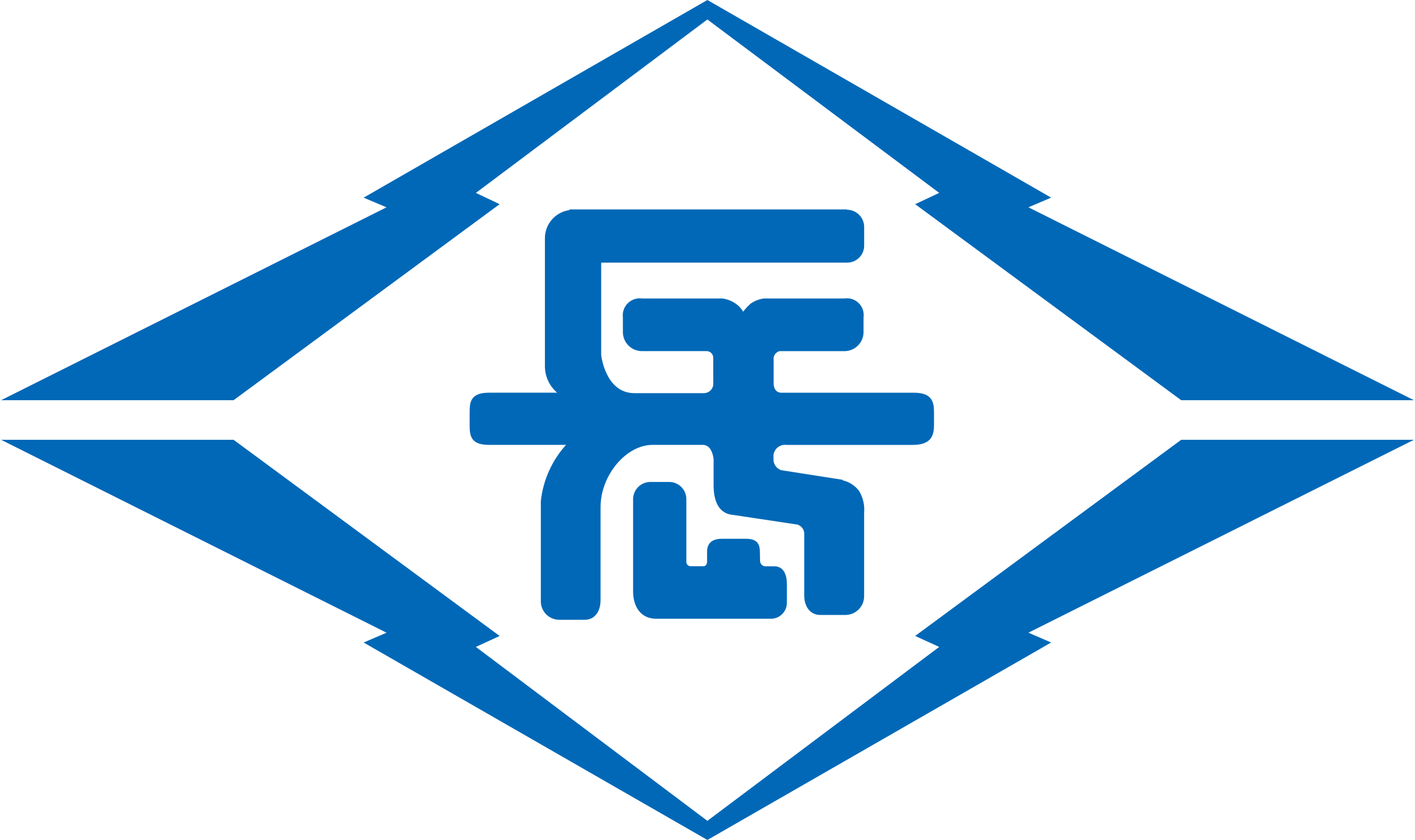

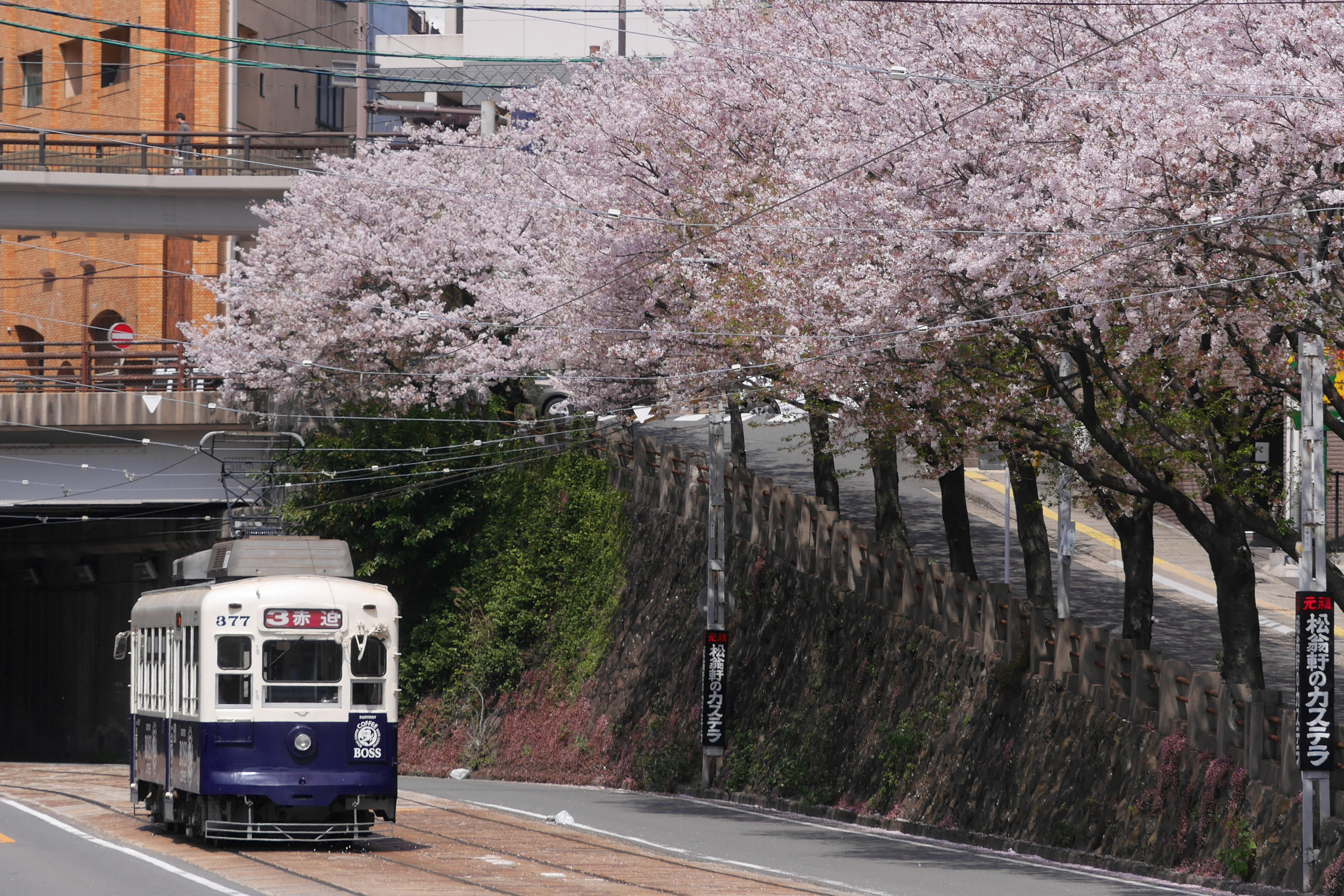
- Tram traveling under cherry blossom trees

Overview
- Native name: 桜町支線
- Locale: Nagasaki
- Termini: Nagasaki-Ekimae; City Hall
- Stations: 3

Service
- Operator(s): Nagasaki Electric Tramway

History
- Opened: 25 December 1919

Technical
- Line length: 0.9 Km
- Number of tracks: 2
- Track gauge: 1,435 mm (4 ft 8 1/2 in)
- Electrification: 600 V DC overhead
Route map
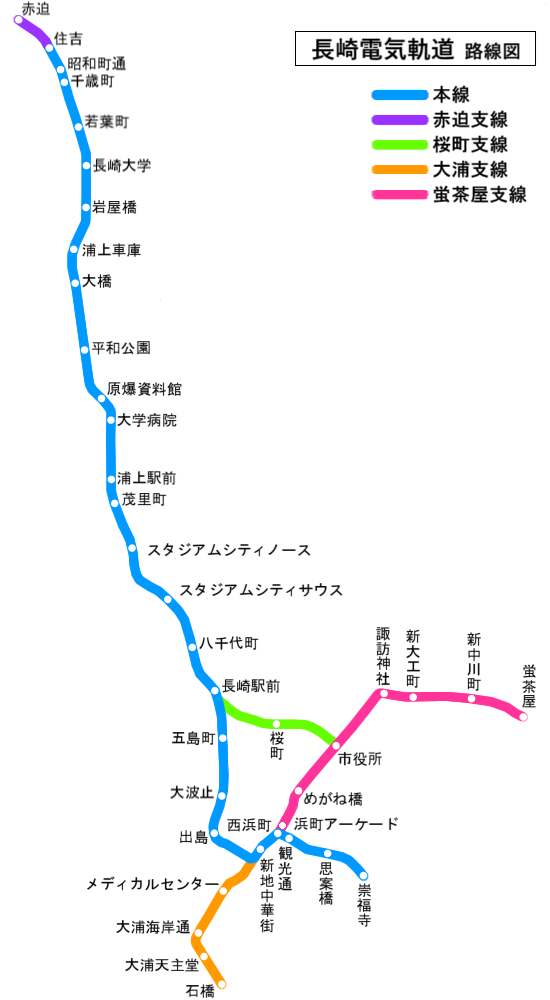
Sakuramachi Line (shown by the green line)

The Nagasaki Electric Tramway Sakuramachi Line (長崎電気軌道桜町支線, Nagasaki-denki-kidō Sakuramachi-shisen) is a light rail line operated by the private railway operator Nagasaki Electric Tramway in the island of Kyushu, Japan. This line is entirely located within Nagasaki.

== Overview ==
Sakuramachi Line connects Main Line with Hotarujaya Line and is the shortcut from Nagasaki Peace Park , Urakami Station and Nagasaki Station to Hotarujaya.

The following route is operated in this line:

- ■ Route 3: Akasako — Sumiyoshi — Nagasaki-Ekimae — Sakuramachi — City Hall — Hotarujaya

== Stations ==
No.	Station	Japanese	Distance (km)	Transfers
27	Nagasaki	長崎駅前	0.0	Nagasaki Electric Tramway: Main Line; Kyushu Railway Company: Nishi Kyushu Shinkansen, Nagasaki Main Line
44	Sakuramachi	桜町	0.5	
45	City Hall	市役所	0.9	Nagasaki Electric Tramway: Hotarujaya Line

== History ==
In 25 December 1919, The section between Nagasaki-Ekimae and Sakuramachi (Note: Different from the recent station.) via Bungomachi (豊後町) (Note: Renamed to Ogawamachi (小川町) after a few years later, and renamed again to Sakuramachi in 1966.) opened. It extended to Umamachi (now Suwa-jinja Shrine) via Furumachi (古町) in the next year. This line was called Furumachi Line (古町支線, Furumachi-shisen) until 1983.

In the 1950s, the route underwent several changes. Nagasaki-Ekimae Station was moved 36 m (118 ft) east in 1950. After that, the section between Ogawamachi and Furumachi was closed and the newer line from Ogawamachi to Okeyamachi (桶屋町) (Note: Renamed for several times: Kokaido-mae (公会堂前, Kōkaidōmae): 1963-2018, Civic Hall (市民会館): 2018-2023, City Hall: 2023-.) was opened in 1954.

Since 2007, 5 derailment accidents have happened at the terminus: twice in 2007, once in 2015, once in 2016 and once in 2019. The most recent incident occurred despite track improvements being made in 2017.
