= Nagasaki Electric Tramway Oura Line =

Oura Line
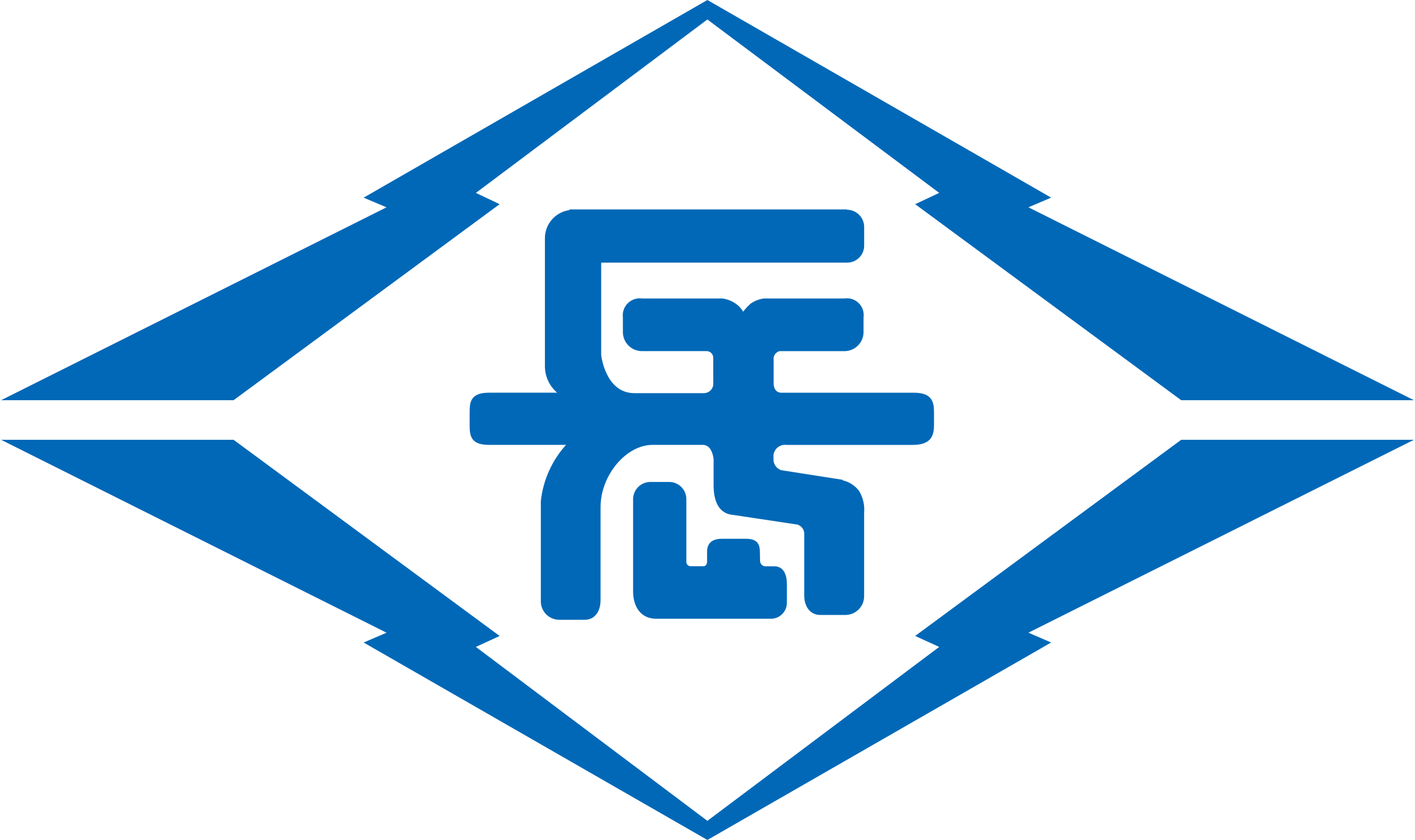

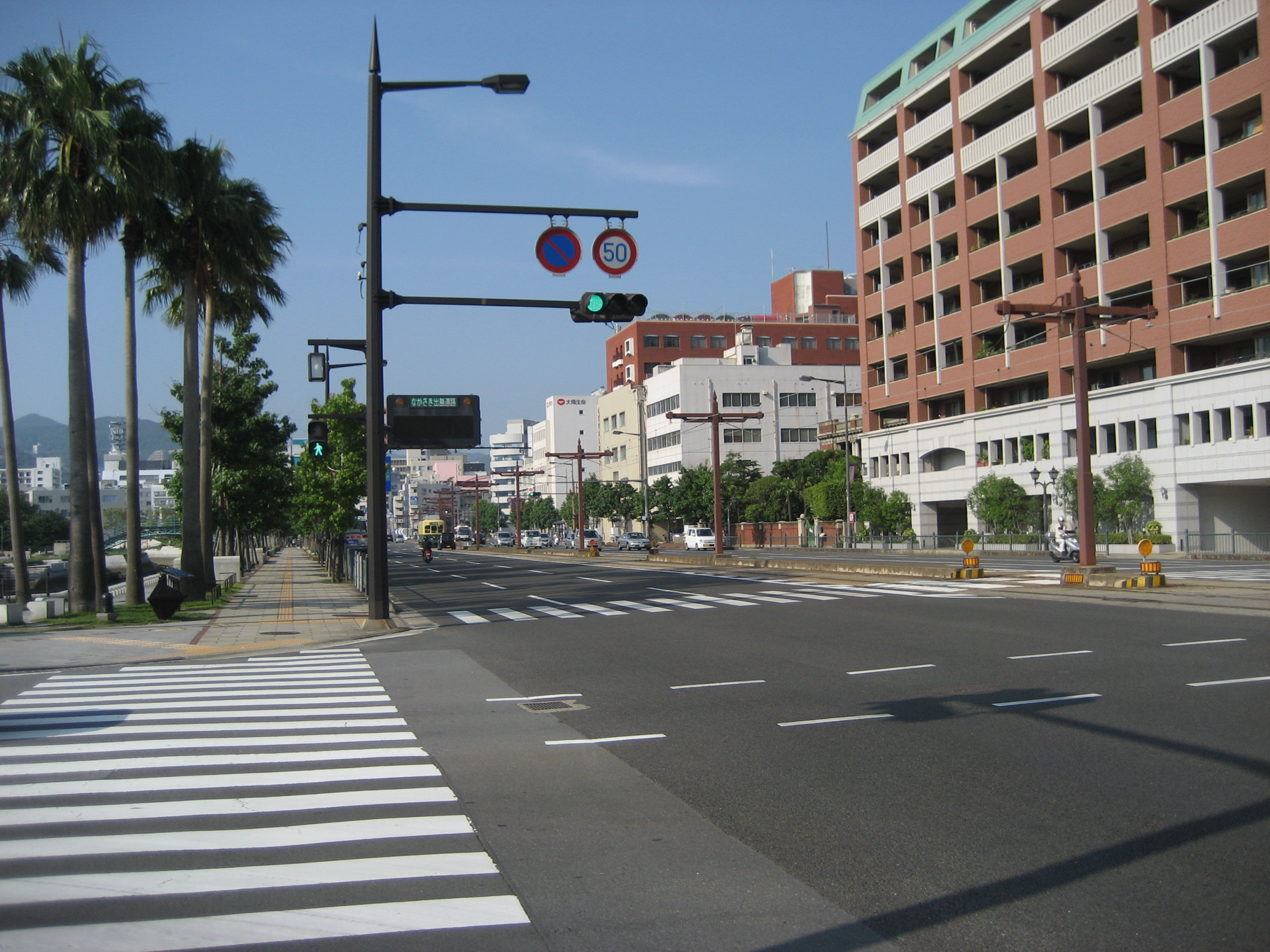
- rails on Route 499

Overview
- Native name: 大浦支線
- Locale: Nagasaki
- Termini: Shinchi Chinatown; Ishibashi
- Stations: 5

Service
- Operator(s): Nagasaki Electric Tramway

History
- Opened: 27 December 1916

Technical
- Line length: 1.1 km
- Number of tracks: 2 and 1
- Track gauge: 1,435 mm (4 ft 8 1/2 in)
- Electrification: 600 V DC overhead
Route map
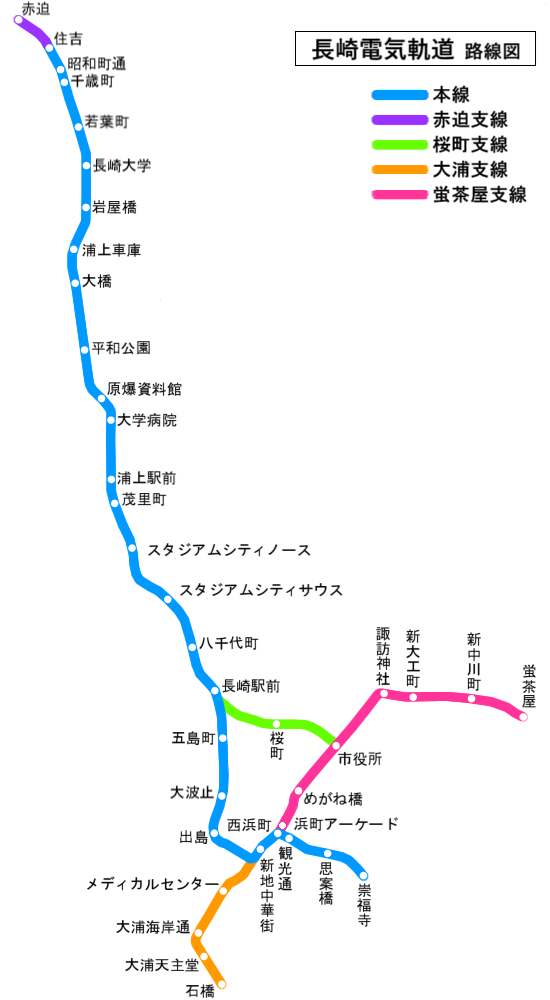
Oura Line (shown by the Orange line)

The Nagasaki Electric Tramway Oura Line (長崎電気軌道大浦支線, Nagasaki-denki-kidō Ōura-shisen) is a light rail line operated by the private railway operator Nagasaki Electric Tramway in the island of Kyushu, Japan. This line is entirely located within Nagasaki.

== Overview ==
Oura Line is the branch to the Oura area of Nagasaki, on which some sites (like Oura Cathedral and Confucius Shrine) are located. There is an only single-track section in the whole Nagasaki Electric Tramway lines.

This line opened on December 27, 1916.

The following routes are operated in this line:

- ■ Route 5: Ishibashi — Shinchi Chinatown — Nishihamanomachi — City Hall — Hotarujaya

== Stations ==
No.	Station	Japanese	Distance (km)	Transfers
32	Shinchi Chinatown	新地中華街	0.0	Nagasaki Electric Tramway: Main Line
36	Medical Center	メディカルセンター	0.4	
37	Ourakaigan-dori	大浦海岸通	0.6	
38	Oura Cathedral	大浦天主堂	0.8	
39	Ishibashi	石橋	1.1	
