= Nagasaki Electric Tramway =

Tram system in Nagasaki, Japan

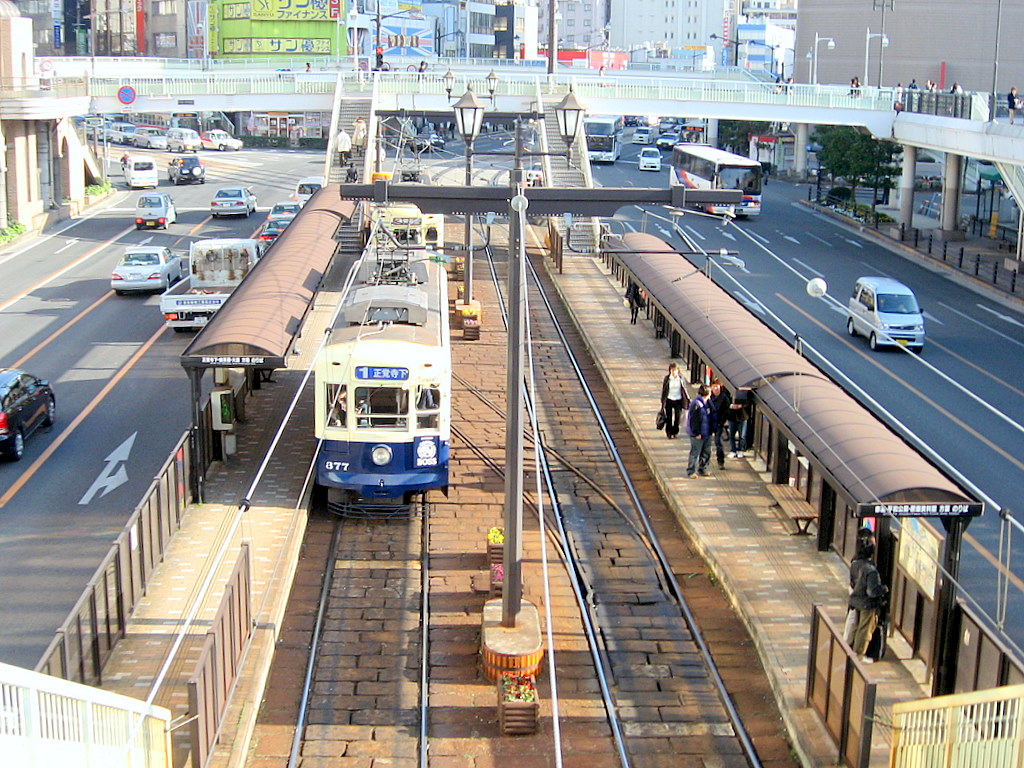
Nagasaki-Ekimae Station.

A Nagasaki Electric Tramway tram, 2016

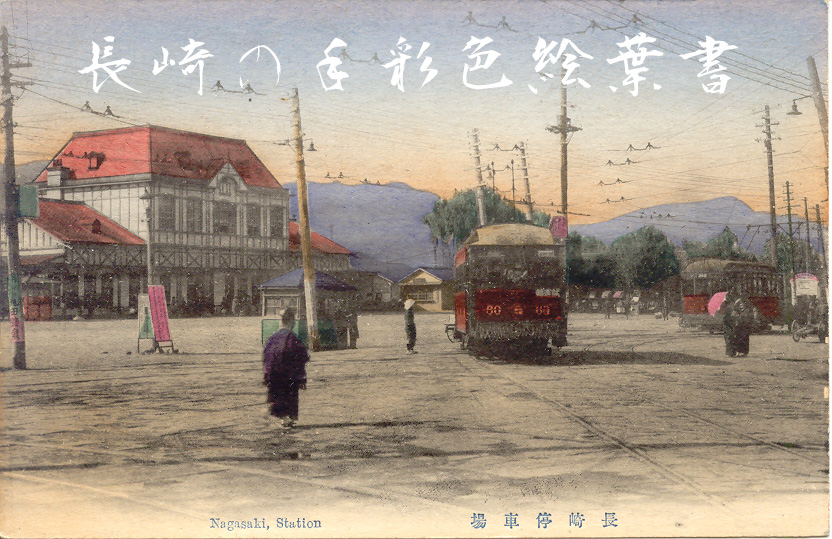
Nagasaki-Ekimae Station, Taisho Period

The Nagasaki Electric Tramway (Note: 長崎電気軌道, Nagasaki Denki Kidō) is a privately operated tram system in Nagasaki, Japan.

The company was founded on August 2, 1914, and the tramway began operation on November 16, 1915. It also operated bus lines until withdrawing from the bus division in 1971. The company and its tramway are commonly known as Nagasaki Electric Railway. (Note: 長崎電鉄, Nagasaki Dentetsu) Locals also refer to the tramway as the electric train, (Note: 電車, densha) while JR services are called JR, train cars, (Note: 列車, ressha) or locomotive trains. (Note: 汽車, kisha)

== Fares ==
Tram no. 378 on route 1

Fares can be paid in cash or by IC card. Free transfers are available only when the fare is paid by IC card. The system also offers a short-distance fare for journeys of up to two segments of track, available when payment is made using one of the Nationwide Mutual Usage Service IC cards, including the region's nimoca card.

The tramway offers one-day and 24-hour passes. The passes are also available through the iPhone and Android versions of the Japan Transit Planner by Jorudan app in several languages.

== Line and routes ==
Tram no. 1203 on route 4 beside the Nakashima River

The system distinguishes between official "lines" and the "routes" operated as scheduled services. Both are listed below. Only stations where routes can change are shown.

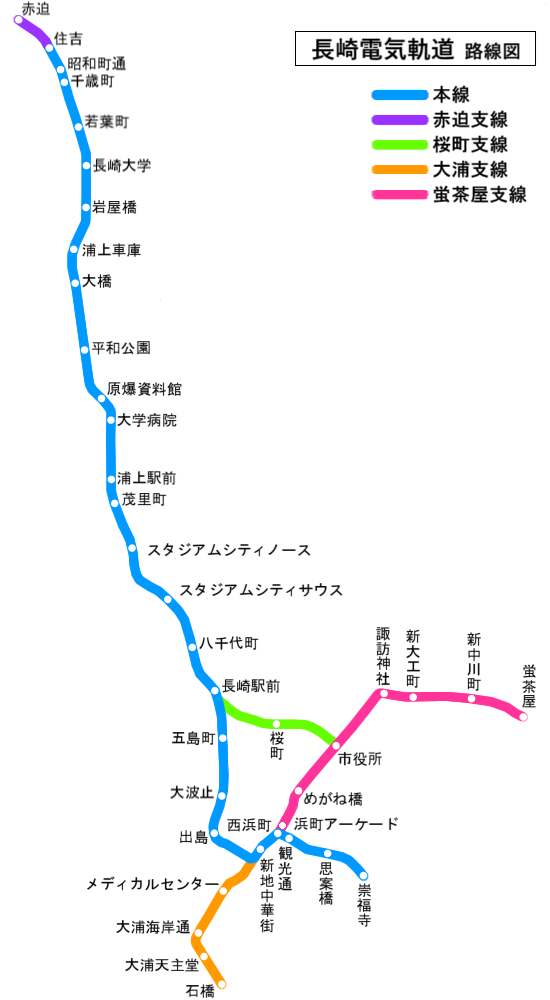
Blue: Main Line Purple: Akasako Line Green: Sakuramachi Line Orange: Ōura Line Pink: Hotaruchaya Line

- Lines: The network comprises five lines totaling 11.5 km (7.1 miles).
  - Main Line (本線): Sumiyoshi — Nagasaki-Ekimae — (Dejima) — Shinchi Chinatown — Nishihamano-machi — Sōfukuji
  - Akasako Line (赤迫支線): Sumiyoshi — Akasako
  - Sakuramachi Line (桜町支線): Nagasaki-Ekimae — (Sakuramachi) — Shiyakusho (City Hall)
  - Ōura Line (大浦支線): Shinchi Chinatown — Ishibashi
  - Hotarujaya Line (蛍茶屋支線): Nishihamanomachi — Shiyakusho (City Hall) — Hotarujaya

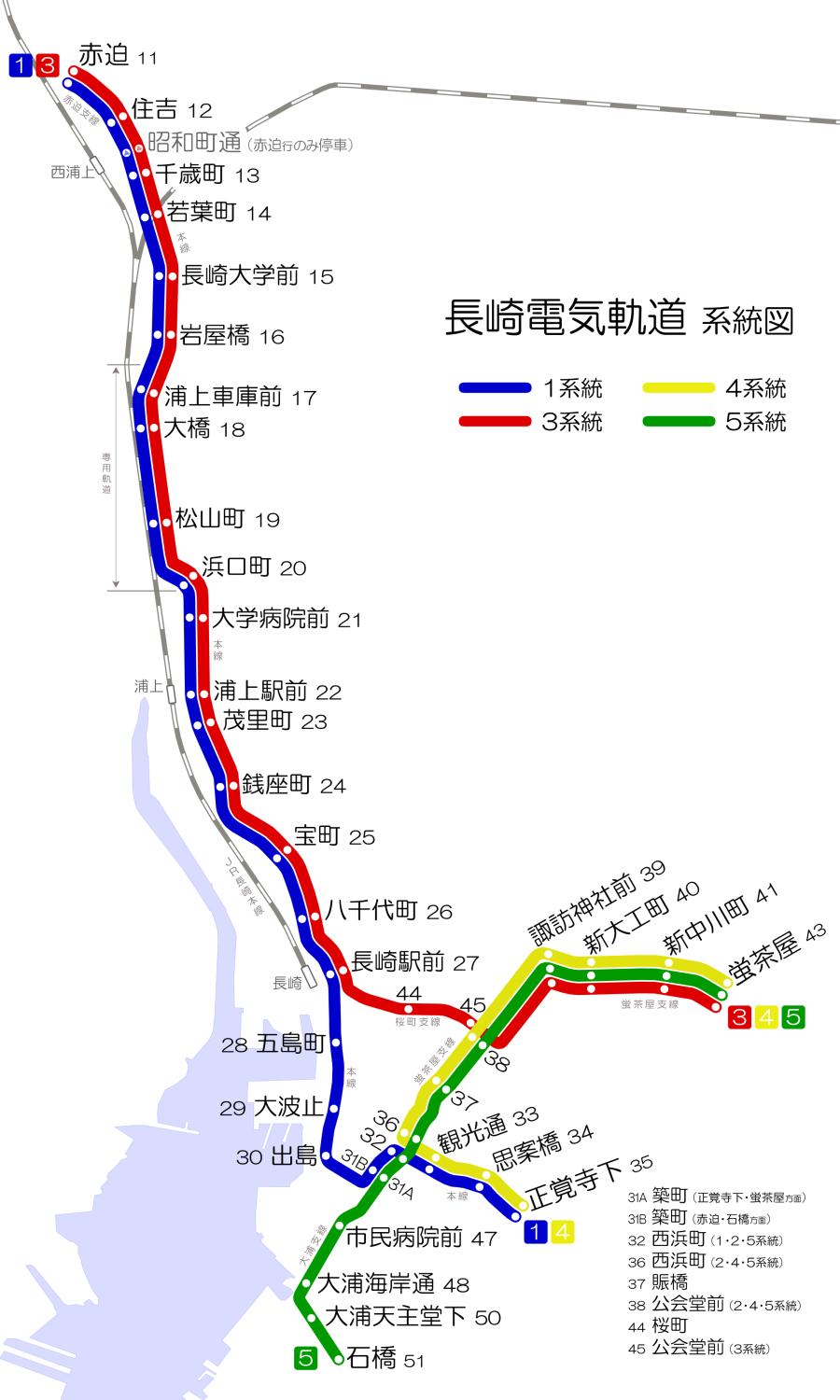
■ Route 1 ■ Route 3 ■ Route 4 ■ Route 5

- Routes: Five routes regularly operate over one or more lines. Route 2 operates only one trip per day late at night and is generally omitted from printed and online route information, while Route 4 operates only during the morning and evening peak periods. Additional temporary routes may also operate.

■ Route 1 (1系統): Akasako — Sumiyoshi — Nagasaki-Ekimae — (Dejima) — Shinchi Chinatown — Nishihamanomachi — Sōfukuji
□ Route 2 (2系統): Akasako — Sumiyoshi — Nagasaki-Ekimae — (Dejima) — Shinchi Chinatown — Nishihamanomachi — Shiyakusho (City Hall) — Hotarujaya
■ Route 3 (3系統): Akasako — Sumiyoshi — Nagasaki-Ekimae — (Sakuramachi) — Shiyakusho (City Hall) — Hotarujaya
■ Route 4 (4系統): Hotarujaya — Shiyakusho (City Hall) — Nishihamanomachi — Sōfukuji
■ Route 5 (5系統): Hotarujaya — Shiyakusho (City Hall) — Nishihamanomachi — Shinchi Chinatown — Ishibashi

== See also ==
- List of light-rail transit systems
