= 413 series =

Class of Japanese electric multiple unit

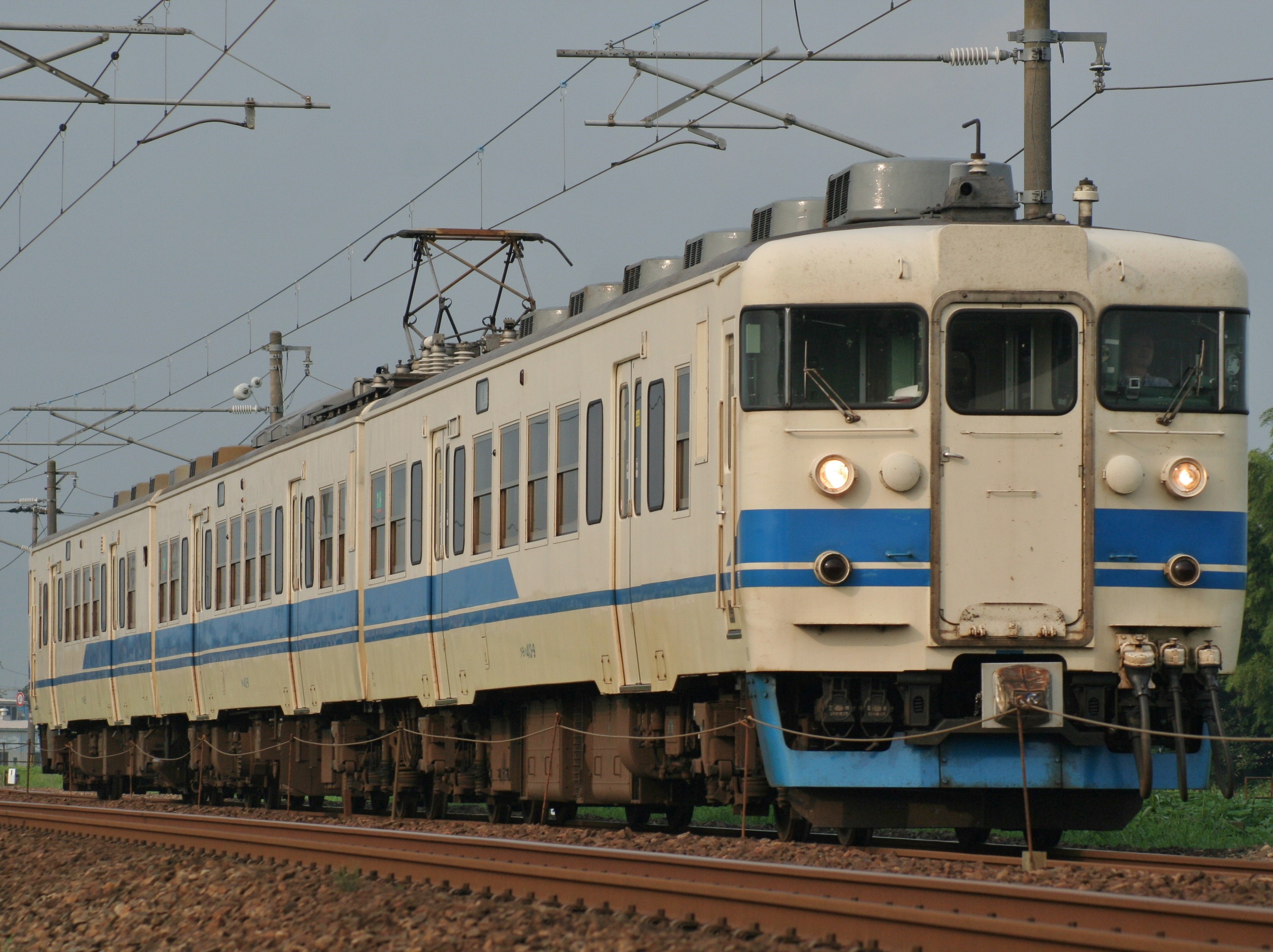
- JR West set B9 in August 2010
- Constructed: 1985–1989
- Entered service: March 1986
- Number built: 31 vehicles (11 sets)
- Number in service: 31 vehicles (11 sets)
- Formation: 3 cars per trainset
- Fleet numbers: B01–B11
- Operators: JNR (1986–1987); JR-West (1987–2021); Ainokaze Toyama Railway (2015–); Echigo Tokimeki Railway (2021–)
- Depot: Kanazawa
- Lines served: Hokuriku Main Line; Ainokaze Toyama Railway Line

Specifications
- Car body construction: Steel
- Car length: 20,000 mm (65 ft 7 in)
- Width: 2,950 mm (9 ft 8 in)
- Doors: 2 pairs per side
- Maximum speed: 110 km/h (70 mph) (service); 130 km/h (80 mph) (design)
- Traction system: Resistor Control
- Traction motors: MT54 (120kW)
- Power output: 120kW
- Transmission: Gear ratio: 19:80
- Electric system: 1,500 V DC, 20 kV AC, 60 Hz overhead catenary
- Current collection: Pantograph
- Track gauge: 1,067 mm (3 ft 6 in)

The 413 series (413系, 413-kei) is a Japanese dual-voltage (1,500 V DC and 20 kV AC 60 Hz) electric multiple unit (EMU) train type first introduced by Japanese National Railways (JNR) in March 1986, and later operated on local services on the Hokuriku Main Line by the West Japan Railway Company (JR-West) from 1987 and also by the third-sector railway operating company Ainokaze Toyama Railway from March 2015. The units were built by re-using the underframes, bogies and electrical equipment from former 471 series and 473 series express-type EMUs with new suburban type bodies based on the design of the 417 series EMUs introduced in 1978.

== Variants ==
- 413-0 series: 29 cars converted from former 471 series cars
- 413-100 series: two cars (KuMoHa 413-101 and MoHa 412-101) converted from former 473 series cars

== Operations ==
JR-West trainsets are used on the Nanao Line, Hokuriku Main Line, and IR Ishikawa Railway. Ainokaze Toyama Railway trainsets are used on the Ainokaze Toyama Railway, IR Ishikawa Railway, and Echigo Tokimeki Railway.

== Formations ==
As of 1 April 2017, all 31 of the 413 series cars built are in service, with six three-car sets (including two 455 series cars) operated by JR-West and five three-car sets operated by Ainokaze Toyama Railway.

Trainsets consist of two motored ("Mc" and "M") cars and a non-powered driving trailer ("Tc") car, with the Tc car at the Kanazawa end.

Designation	Mc	M'	Tc'
Numbering	KuMoHa 413	MoHa 412	KuHa 412

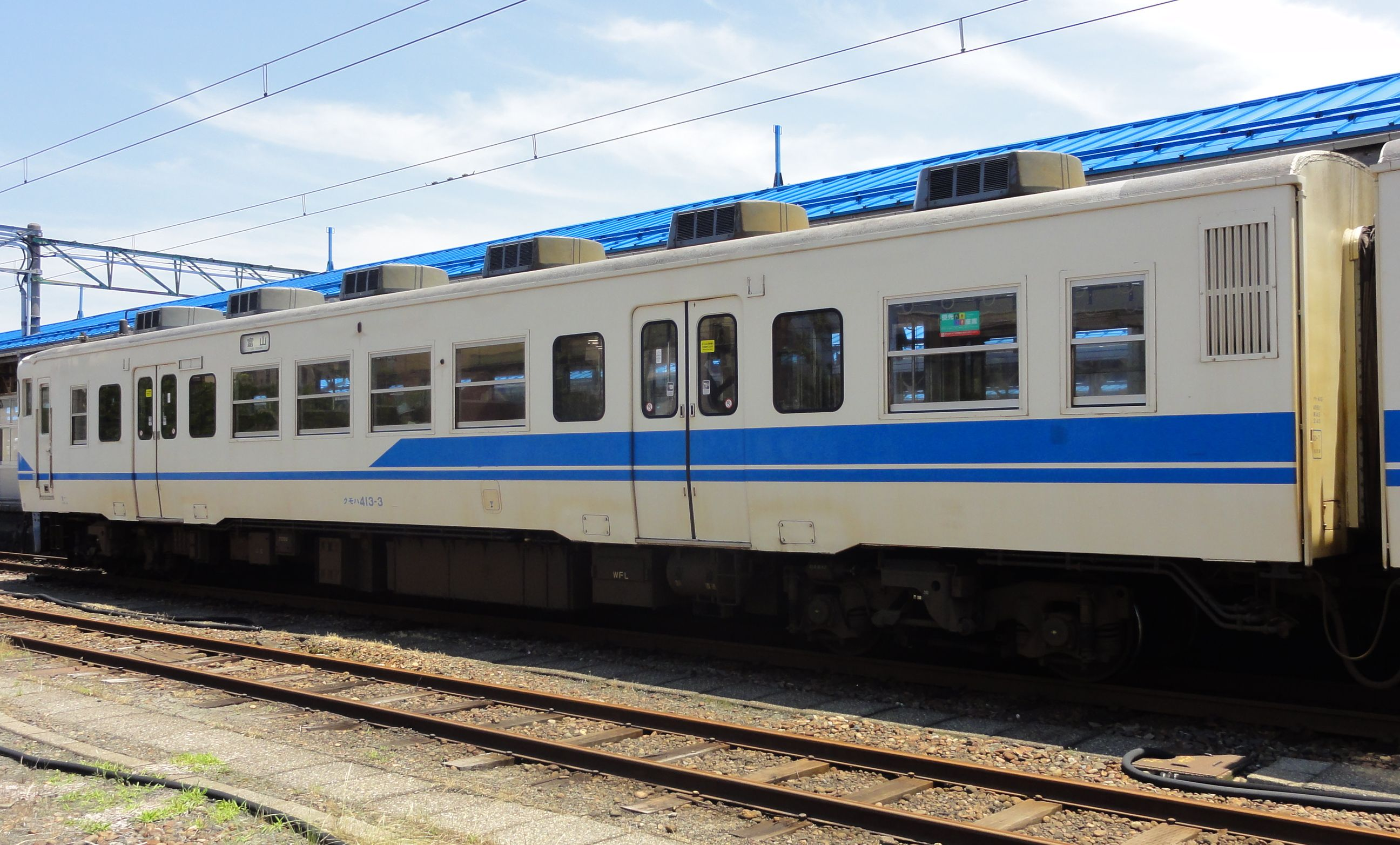
KuMoHa 413-3 of set B03 in June 2011

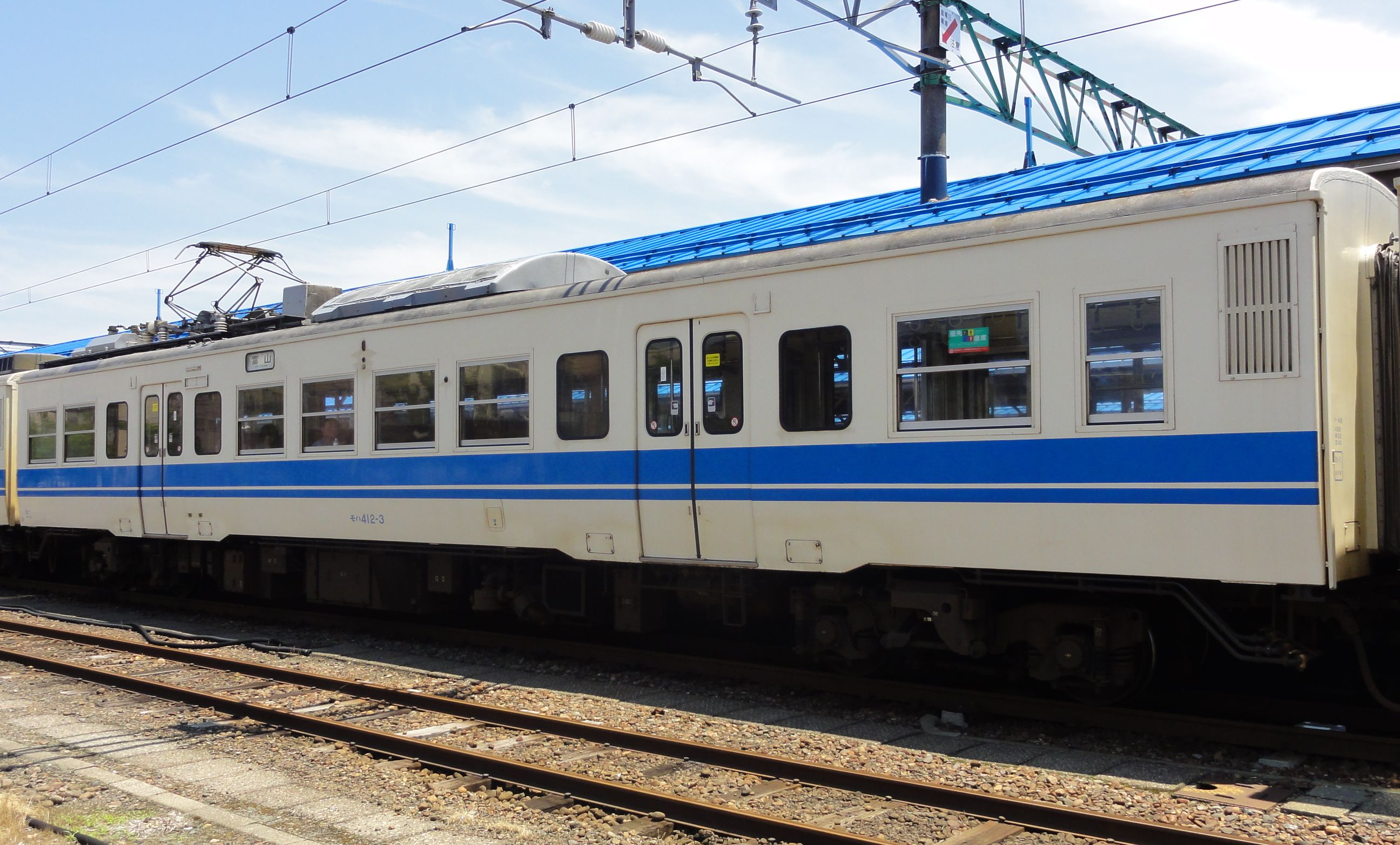
MoHa 412-3 of set B03 in June 2011

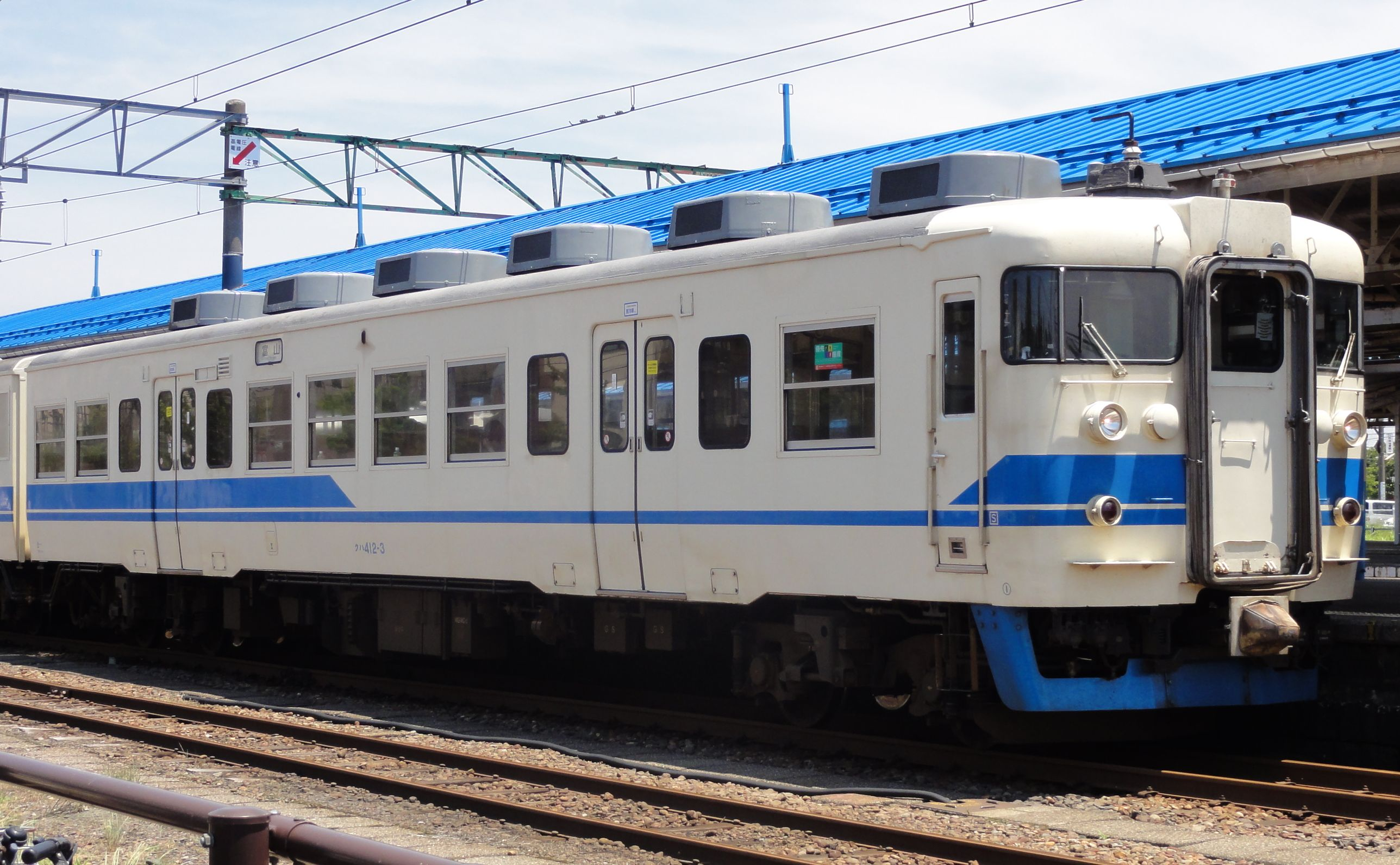
KuHa 412-3 of set B03 in June 2011
- The MoHa 412 car is fitted with one PS21 lozenge-type pantograph.
- Sets B04 and B11 have a KuHa 455-700 driving car at the west (Kanazawa) end. These were converted from former SaHa 455 intermediate cars.
- Set B11 includes 413-100 series cars KuMoHa 413-101 and MoHa 412-101.
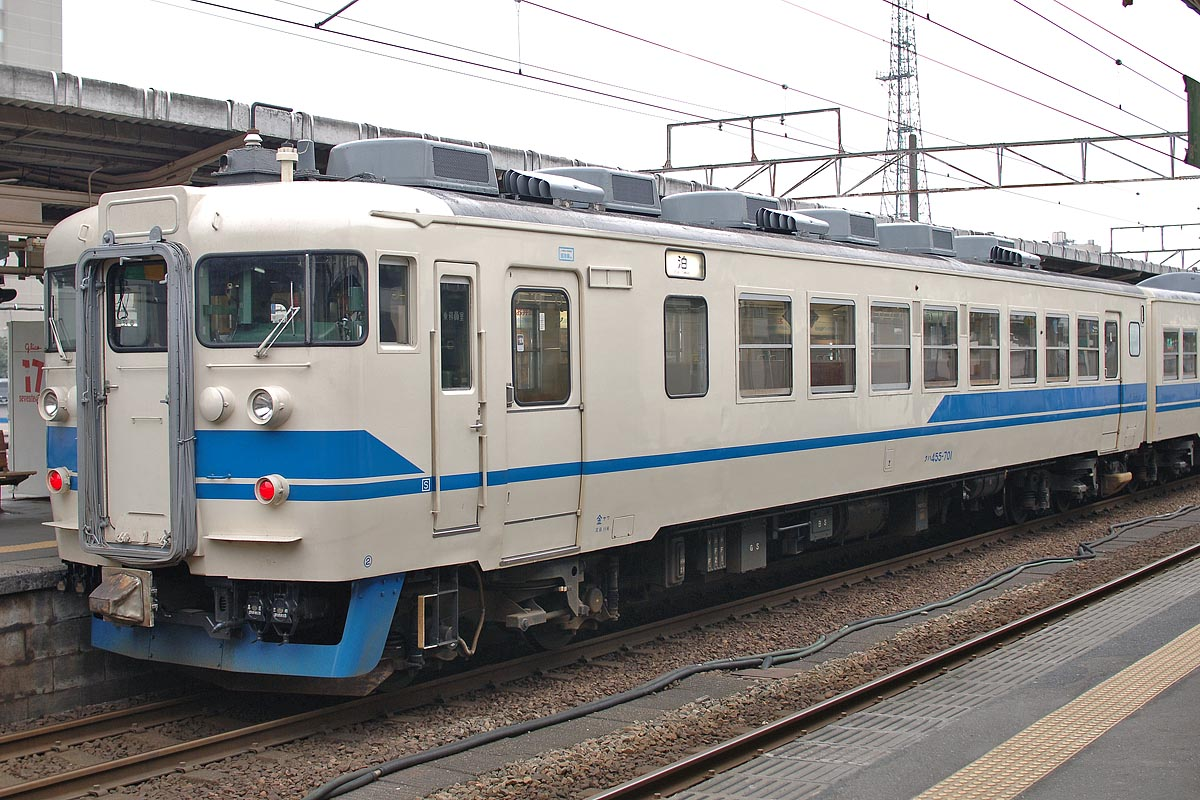
KuHa 455-701 in set B04 in April 2006

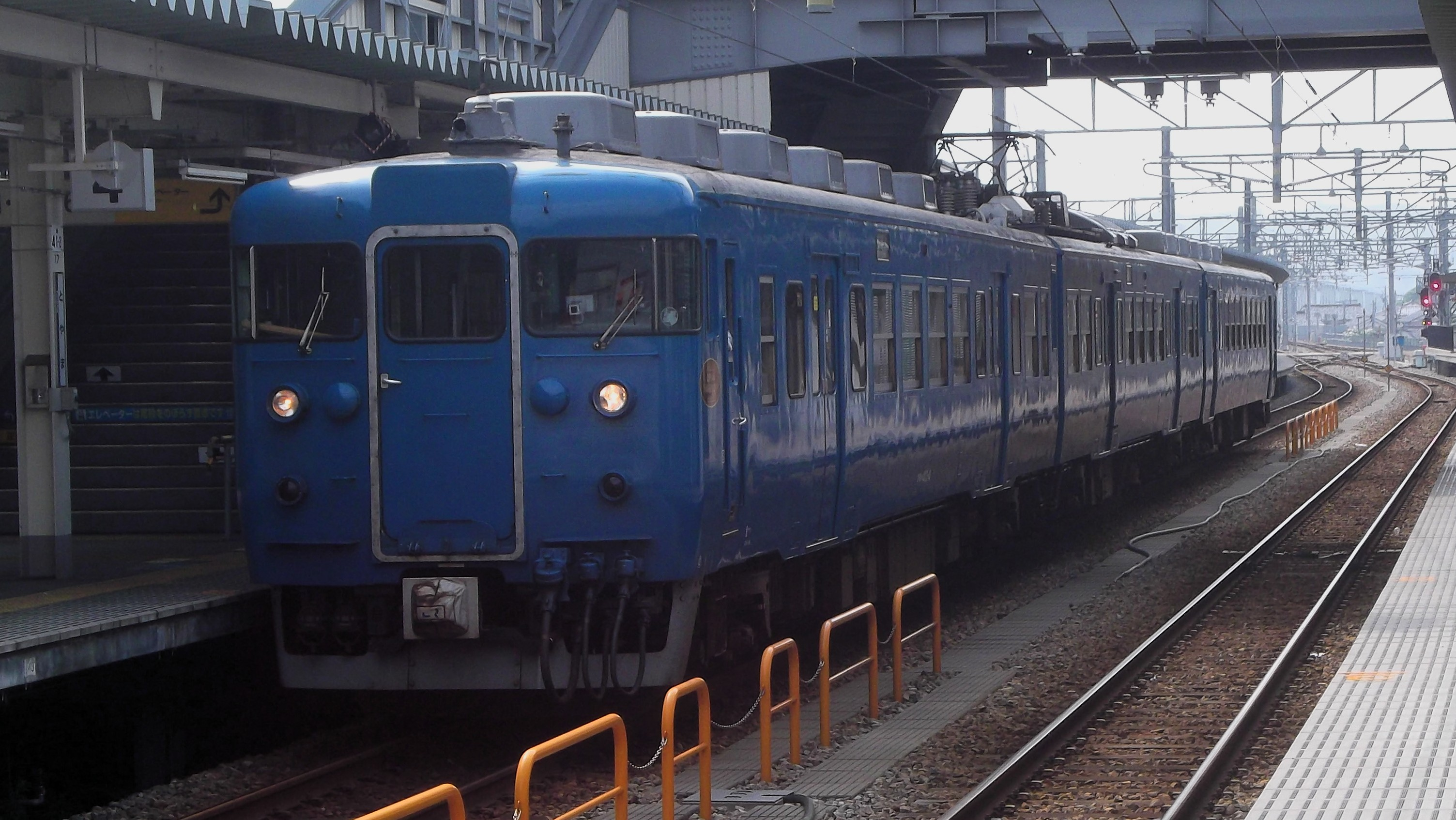
Set B04 in July 2013, with its KuHa 455 driving car visible at the rear end

== Interior ==
Passenger accommodation consists of a mixture of transverse four-person seating bays and longitudinal bench seating.

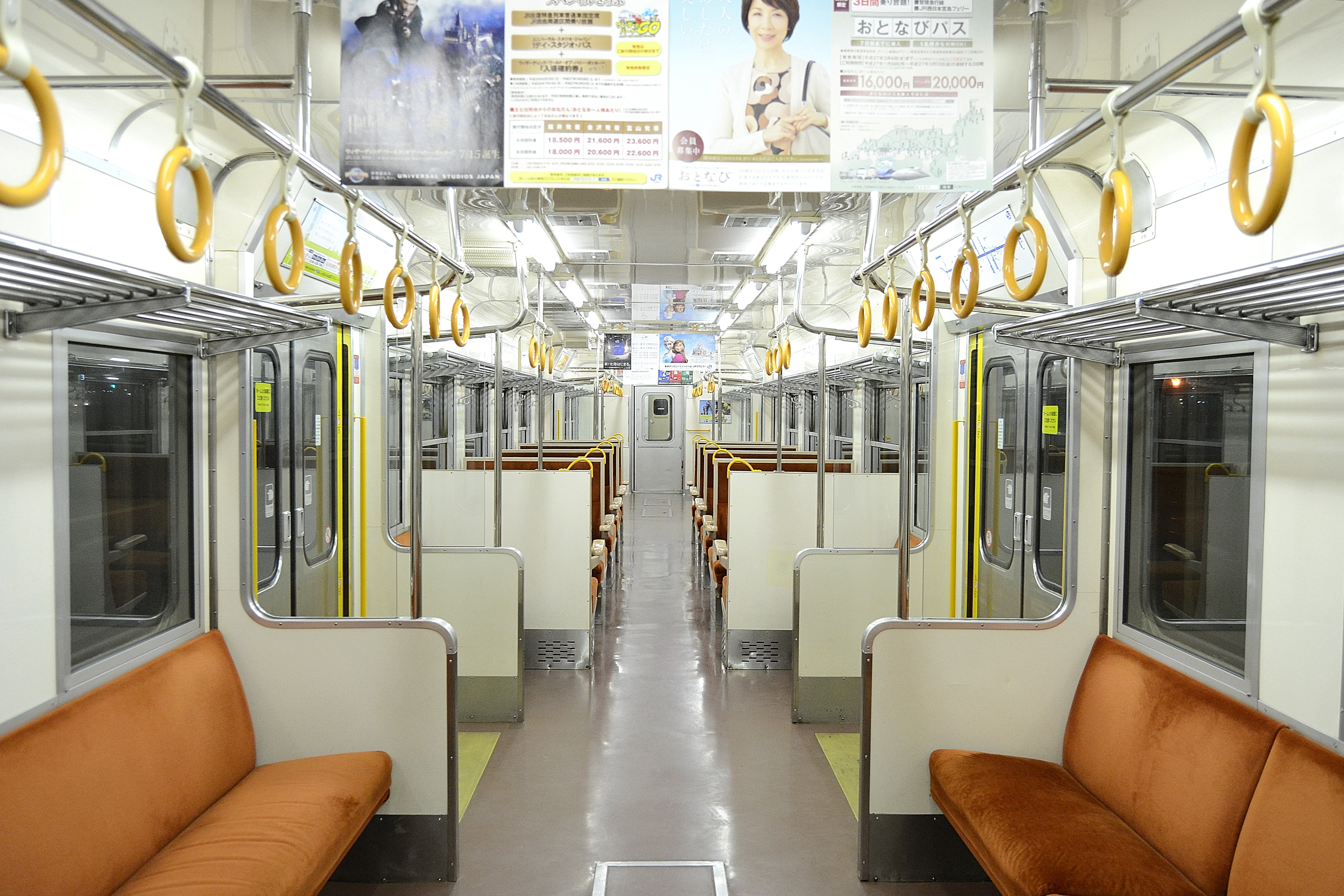
Interior of a refurbished 413 series set in February 2015

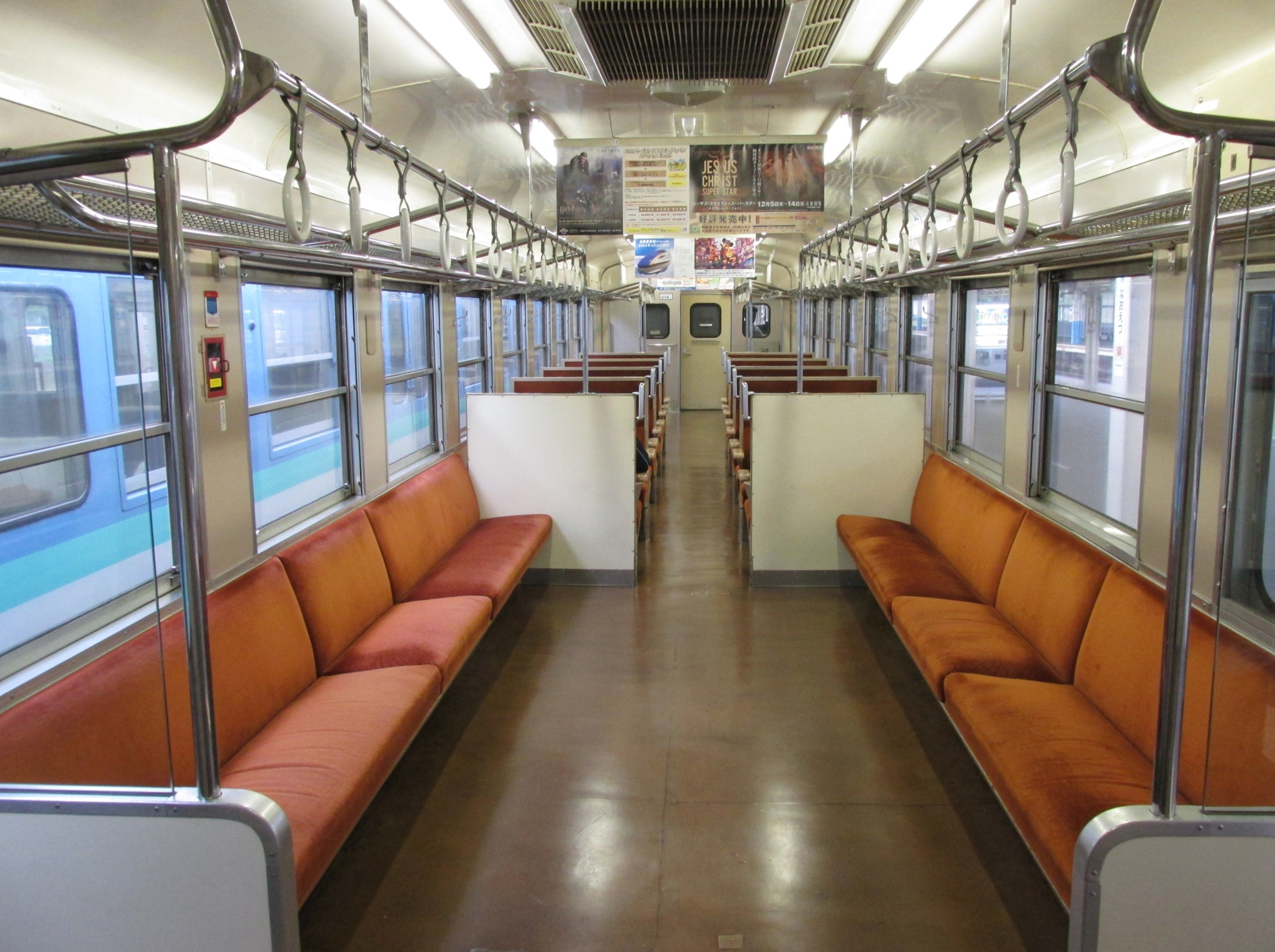
The interior of 455 series car KuHa 455-702 included in 413 series set B11

== History ==
The eleven three-car sets were built between 1985 and 1989.

From 14 March 2015, five 413 series sets (B01 to B03, B07, and B10) were transferred from JR-West ownership to the third-sector railway operating company Ainokaze Toyama Railway, which took over control of the section of the former Hokuriku Main Line within Toyama Prefecture when it was separated from the JR-West network, coinciding with the opening of the Hokuriku Shinkansen extension from Nagano to Kanazawa. The former identities of the trainsets operated by Ainokaze Toyama Railway are as follows:

Set No.	Former JR-West No.
AM01	B01
AM02	B02
AM03	B03
AM04	B07
AM05	B10

In 2016, Ainokaze Toyama Railway set AM03 was modified at JR-West's Kanazawa Workshop for use as a special-event train, receiving Toyama Emaki (とやま絵巻) branding and a new external livery.

== Future developments ==
From the first half of fiscal 2018, an Ainokaze Toyama Railway 413 series set will be rebuilt as a tourist train, returning to service on the line in the second half of fiscal 2018.

== Livery variations ==
Initially painted in maroon with a white stripe, the sets later received the JR-West "New Hokuriku" livery of "oyster white" with "light cobalt blue" lining. From 2012, some sets received the overall blue (color code "DIC N-897") livery applied to JR-West Kanazawa area local trainsets, however, the JR-West fleet was subsequently repainted into an overall crimson (color code "DIC N-715") Nanao Line livery, with all trainsets treated by August 2017.

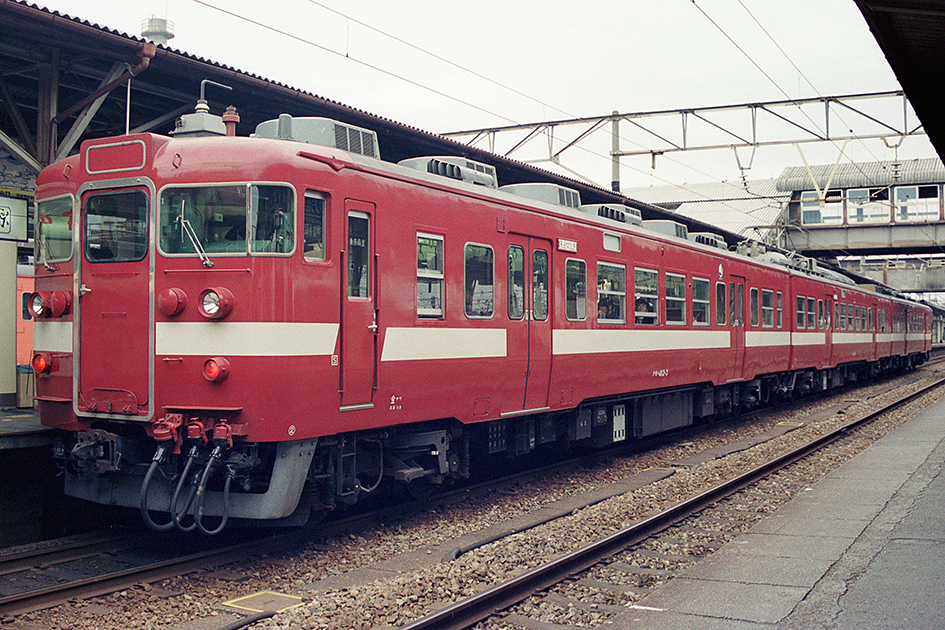
A 413 series in original AC/DC local livery in 1987

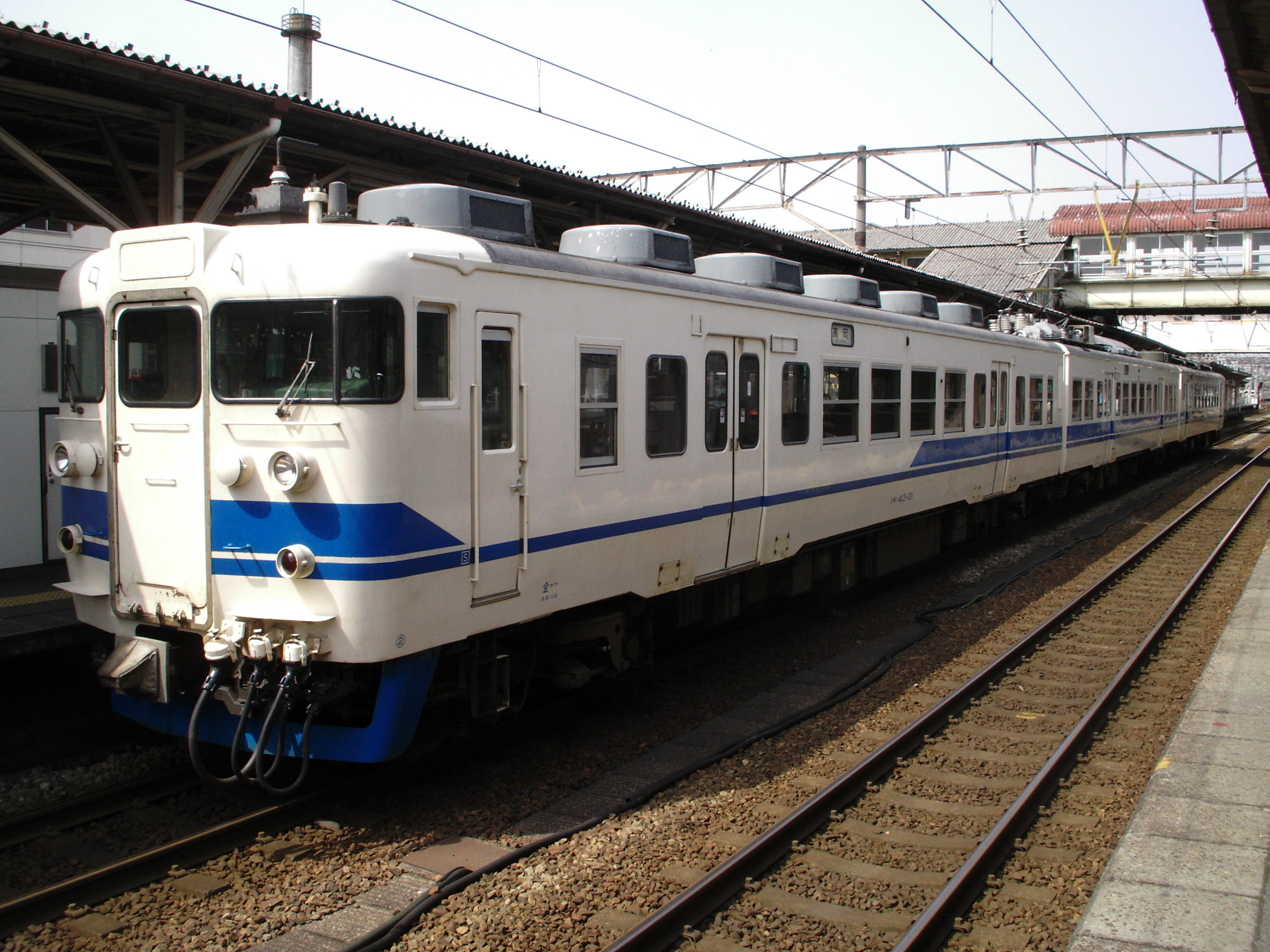
Set B11 in JR-West "New Hokuriku" livery in March 2006

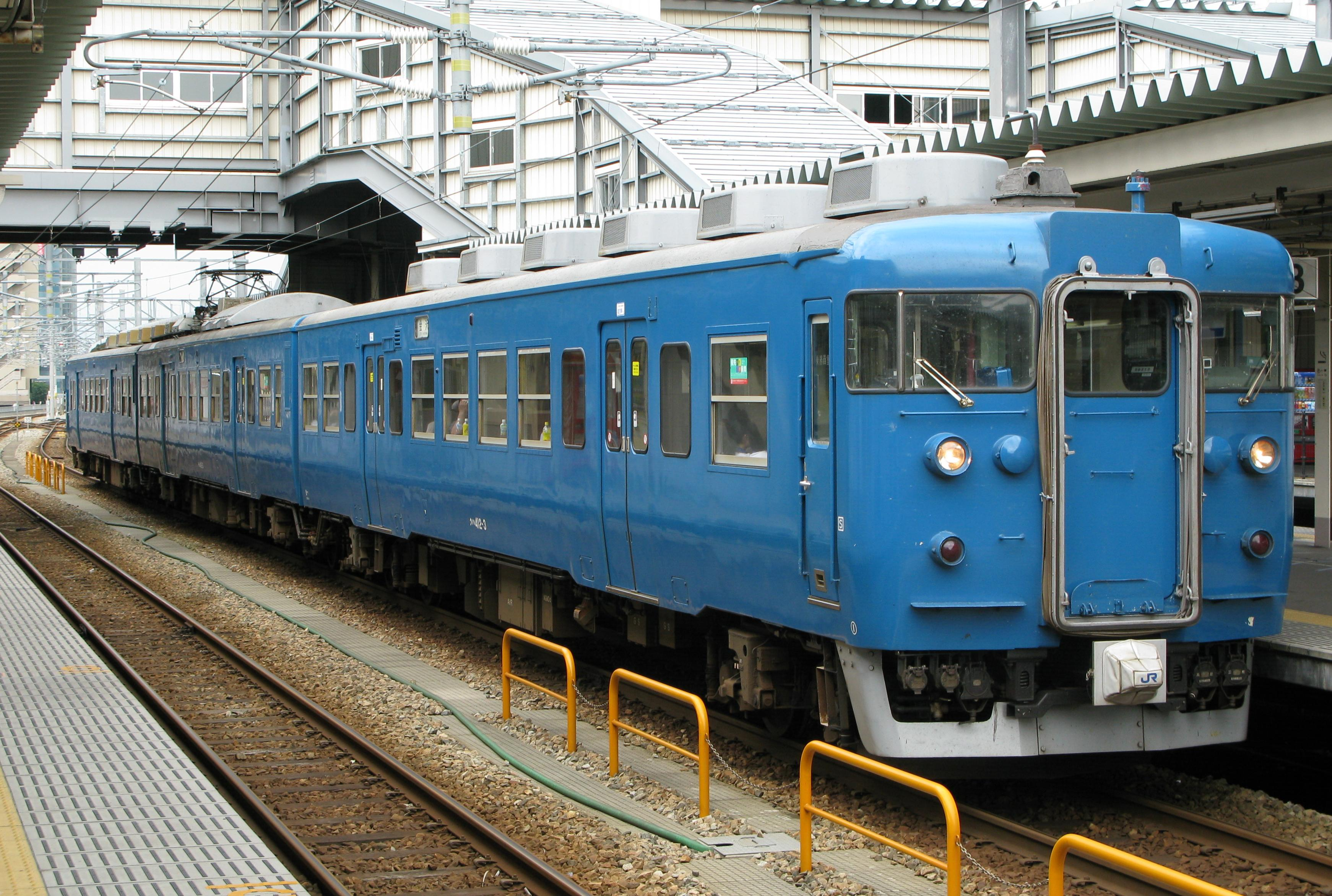
Set B03 in JR-West all-over blue in July 2013

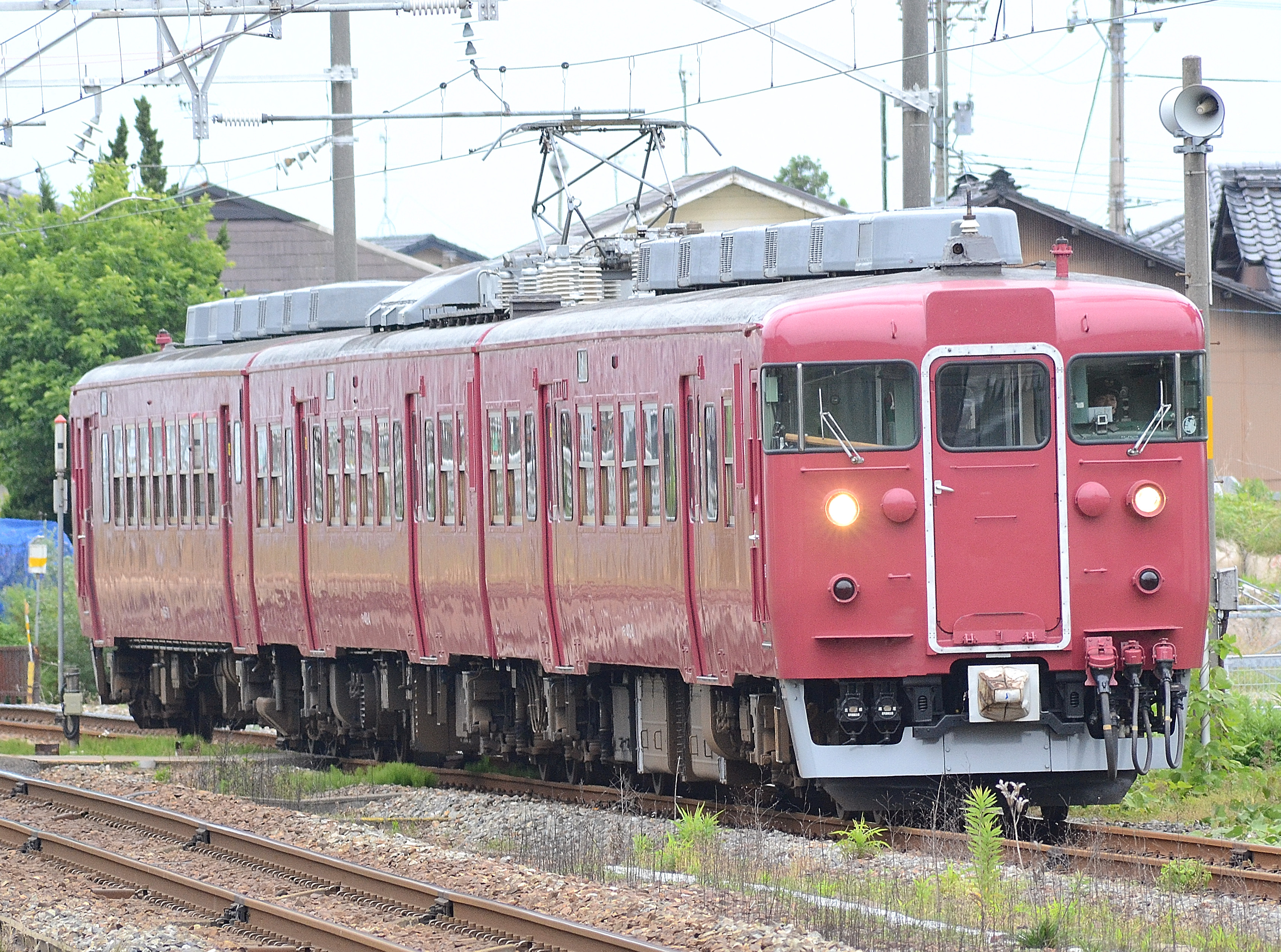
Set B04 in JR-West all-over crimson Nanao Line livery in June 2015

=== JR-West ===
Set No.	Livery (as of August 2017)	All-over blue	All-over crimson
B04	Crimson	February 2013	April 2015
B05	Crimson	-	December 2015
B06	Crimson	-	March 2016
B08	Crimson	February 2013	April 2016
B09	Crimson	February 2013	August 2017
B11	Crimson	-	July 2015

=== Ainokaze Toyama Railway ===
Set No.	Livery (as of April 2016)	All-over blue	Notes
AM01	White/blue	-	
AM02	White/blue	-	
AM03	Toyama Emaki	March 2013	Converted to Toyama Emaki train in August 2016
AM04	Blue	May 2014	
AM05	Blue	February 2014	
