= 455 series =

Japanese train type

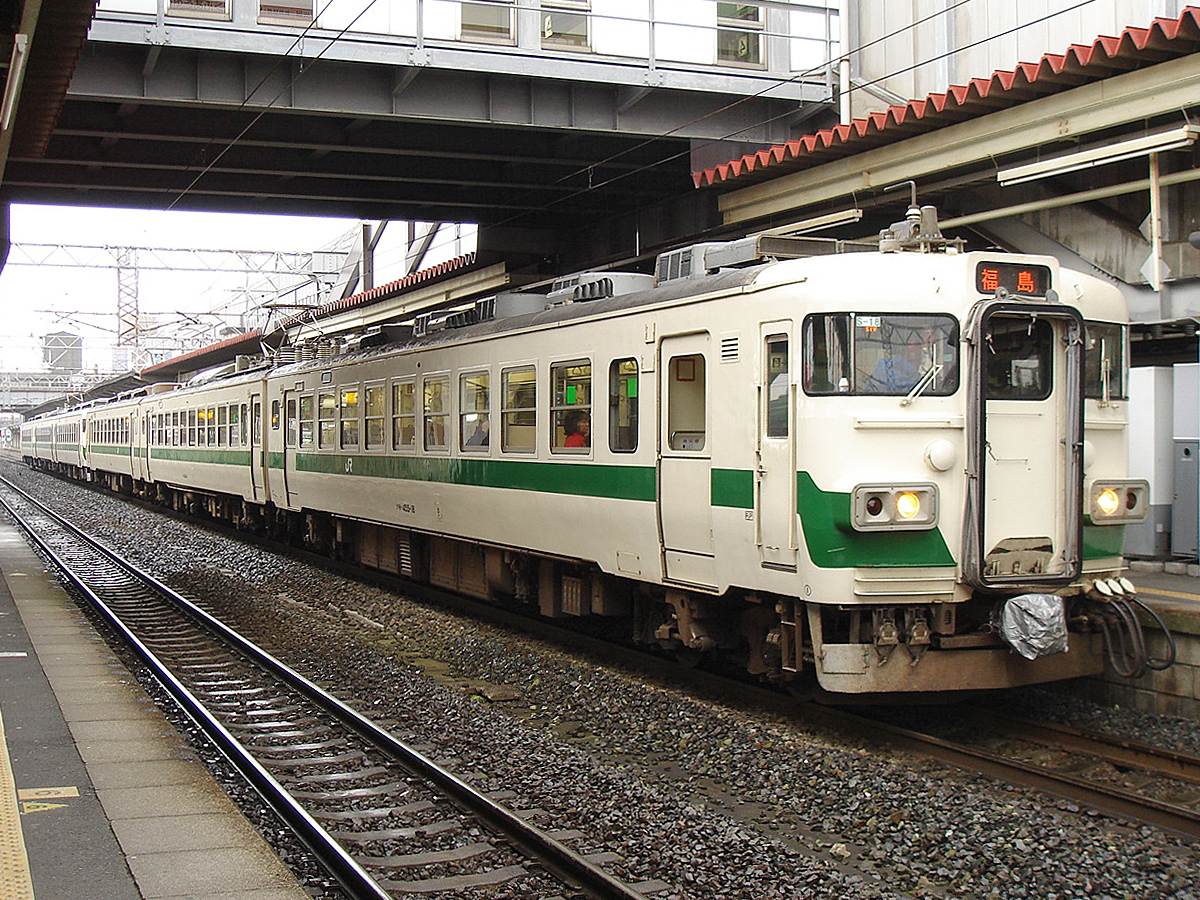
- A JR East 455 series in 2006
- In service: October 1965–March 2015 (general service); 2015–2021 (remaining driving cab mixed from 413/455 series trainsets of JR West)
- Constructed: 1965–1971
- Number in service: 2 vehicles
- Number preserved: 3 vehicles
- Operators: JNR (1965–1987); JR East (1987–2008); JR Kyushu (1987–2010); JR West (1987–2015, 2015-2021); Echigo Tokimeki Railway (2021–)

Specifications
- Car body construction: Steel
- Car length: 20,000 mm (65 ft 7 in)
- Width: 2,950 mm (9 ft 8 in)
- Doors: 2 per side
- Maximum speed: 110 km/h (70 mph)
- Traction system: Resistor control
- Traction motors: MT54 120 kW traction motors
- Electric system: 1,500 V DC, 20 kV AC 50 Hz
- Current collection: Overhead catenary
- Multiple working: 451/453/457/471/473 series
- Track gauge: 1,067 mm (3 ft 6 in)

The 455 series (455系, 455-kei) is a Japanese dual-voltage (1,500 V DC and 20 kV AC 50 Hz) electric multiple unit (EMU) train type introduced by Japanese National Railways (JNR) on express services in 1965 and later operated by East Japan Railway Company (JR East), West Japan Railway Company (JR-West), and Kyushu Railway Company (JR Kyushu).

The last sets operated by JR-West were withdrawn in 2015. However, 2 cars remain in service as the driving car of a mixed 413/455 series set until they resold to the private railway operator in 2021 hence ended their overall service by JR West.

== Design ==
Intended for use in the Tohoku region, the basic design and appearance was identical to the 475 series dual-voltage (1,500 V DC and 20 kV AC 60 Hz) EMUs introduced around the same time in Kyushu, and similar to the earlier 453 and 473 series EMUs. The first units built were not equipped with air-conditioning, except for the SaRo 455 "Green" (first class) cars.

== Variants ==
- 455-0 series
- 455-200 series
- 455-300 series
- 455-400 series
- 455-500 series
- 455-600 series
- 455-700 series

=== 455-0 series ===
These were the 455 series cars built from new between 1965 and 1971.

- KuHa 455-1 – 75, driving trailer cars
- KuMoHa 455-1 – 51, driving motor cars
- KuRoHa 455–1, composite driving trailer converted from KuHa 455–44 with three rows of "Green" (first class) seats
- MoHa 454-1 – 51, intermediate motor cars, with pantograph
- SaHa 455-1 – 8, intermediate trailer cars (built for use in 457 series sets)
- SaRo 455-1 – 45, "Green" (first class) trailer cars
- SaHaShi 455-1 – 26, buffet cars
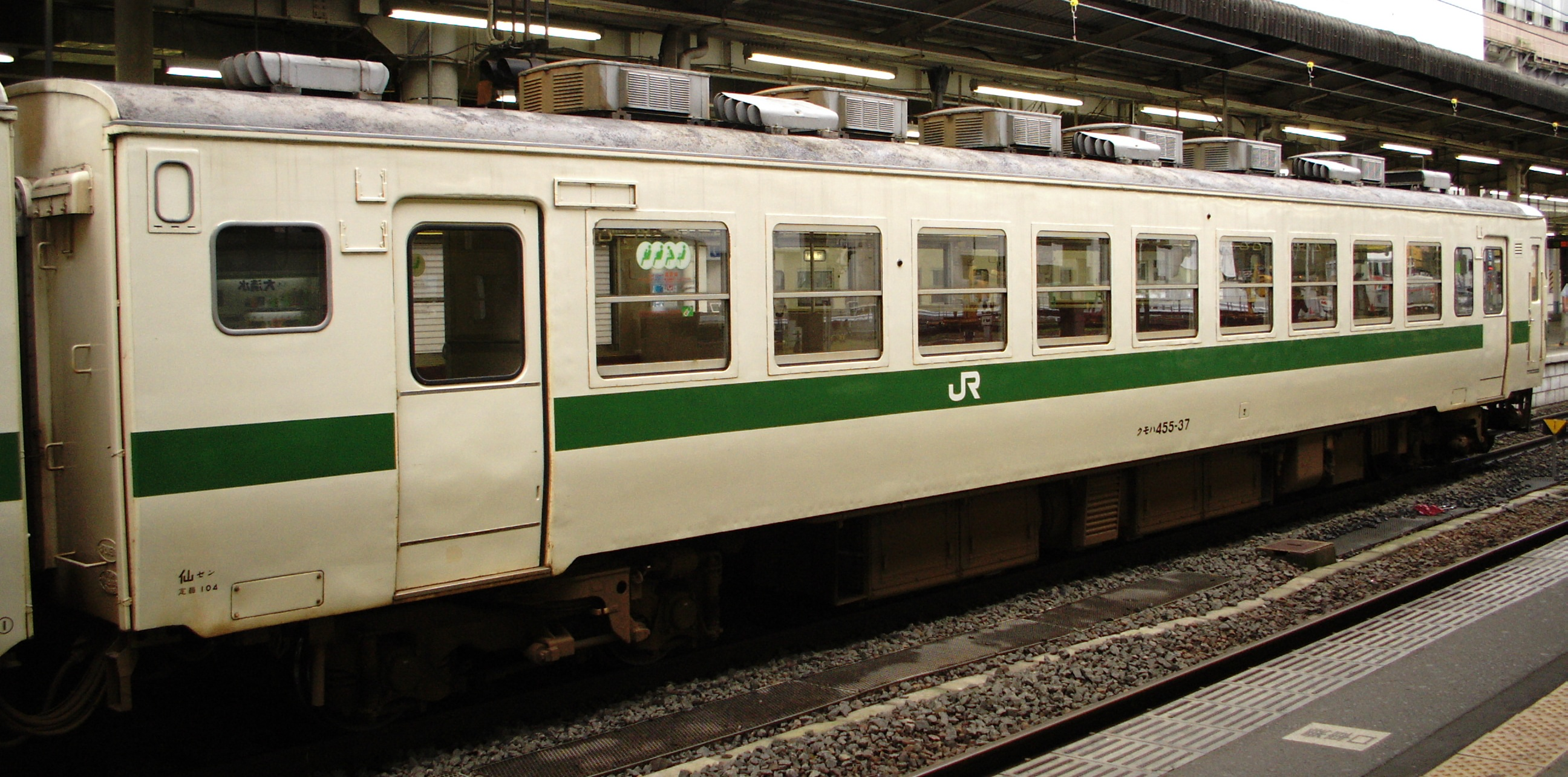
JR East KuMoHa 455–37, July 2006

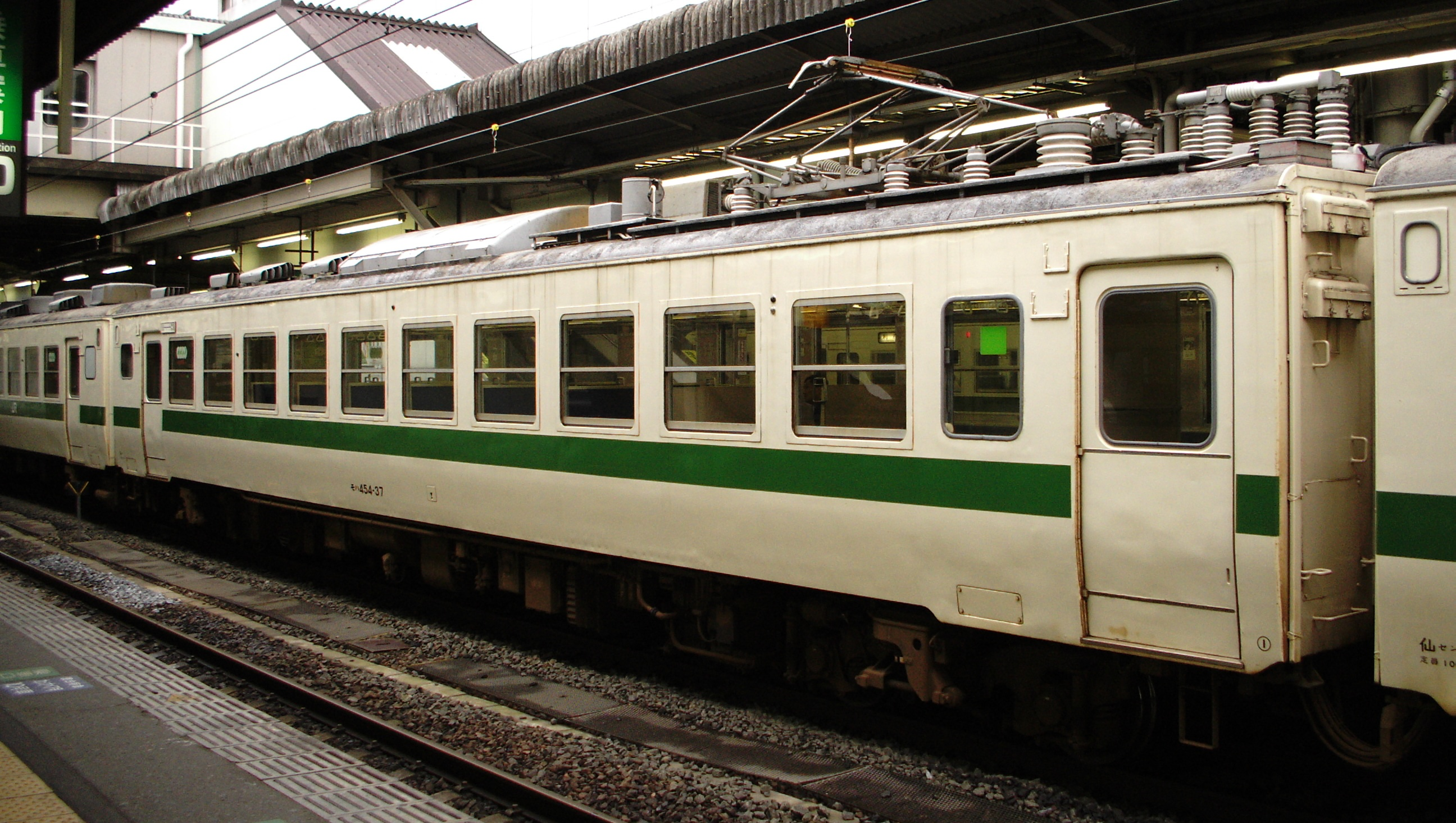
JR East MoHa 454–37, July 2006

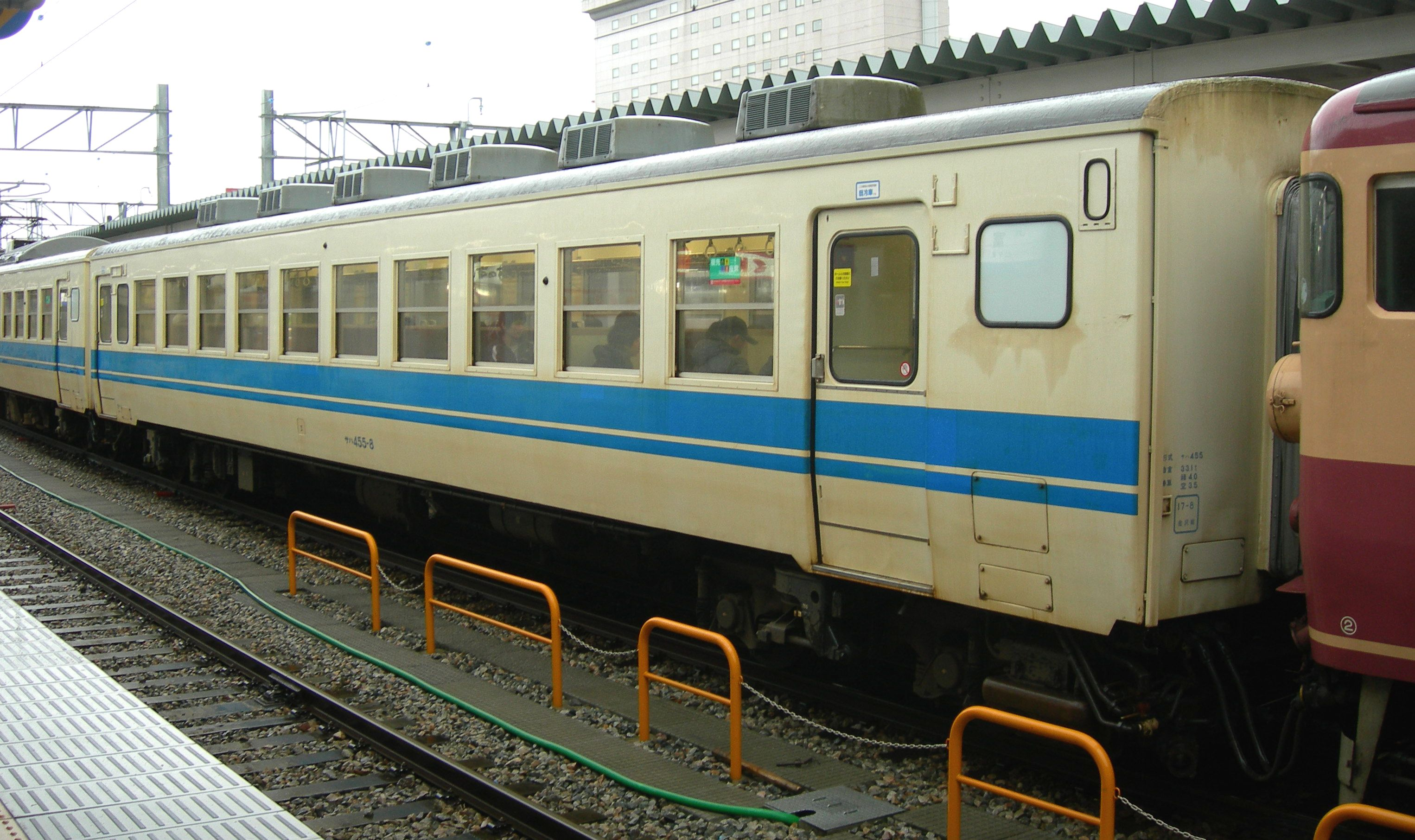
JR-West SaHa 455–8, March 2010

With the reduction in express services and gradual reassignment of 455 series sets to local services, a number of cab cars were subsequently rebuilt from intermediate cars or other EMU types from 1975 to allow shorter sets to be formed.

=== 455-200 series ===
- KuHa 455-201: Rebuilt in 1975 from SaHaShi 455-18 buffet car
- KuHa 455-202 – 203: Rebuilt in 1979 from 451 series EMU driving cars KuHa 451-26 and 27

=== 455-300 series ===
- KuHa 455-301 – 320: Rebuilt in 1984 from 165 series EMU KuHa 165 driving cars.
- KuHa 455-321 – 324: Rebuilt 1984-1985 from 169 series EMU KuHa 169-900 driving cars.

=== 455-400 series ===
- KuHa 455-401: Rebuilt in 1984 from 165 series EMU KuMoHa 165 driving car.
- KuHa 455-402 – 405: Rebuilt 1984-1985 from 169 series EMU KuMoHa 169-900 driving cars.

=== 455-500 series ===
- KuHa 455-501 – 505: Rebuilt in 1983 from 165 series EMU SaHa 165 intermediate trailer cars.

=== 455-600 series ===
- KuHa 455-601 – 605: Rebuilt in 1984 from 455 series EMU SaRo 455 intermediate "Green" trailer cars.
- KuHa 455-606 – 611: Rebuilt from 165 series EMU SaRo 165 intermediate "Green" trailer cars.

=== 455-700 series ===
- KuHa 455-701 – 702: Rebuilt in 1986 and 1987 from 455 series EMU SaHa 455 intermediate trailer cars.
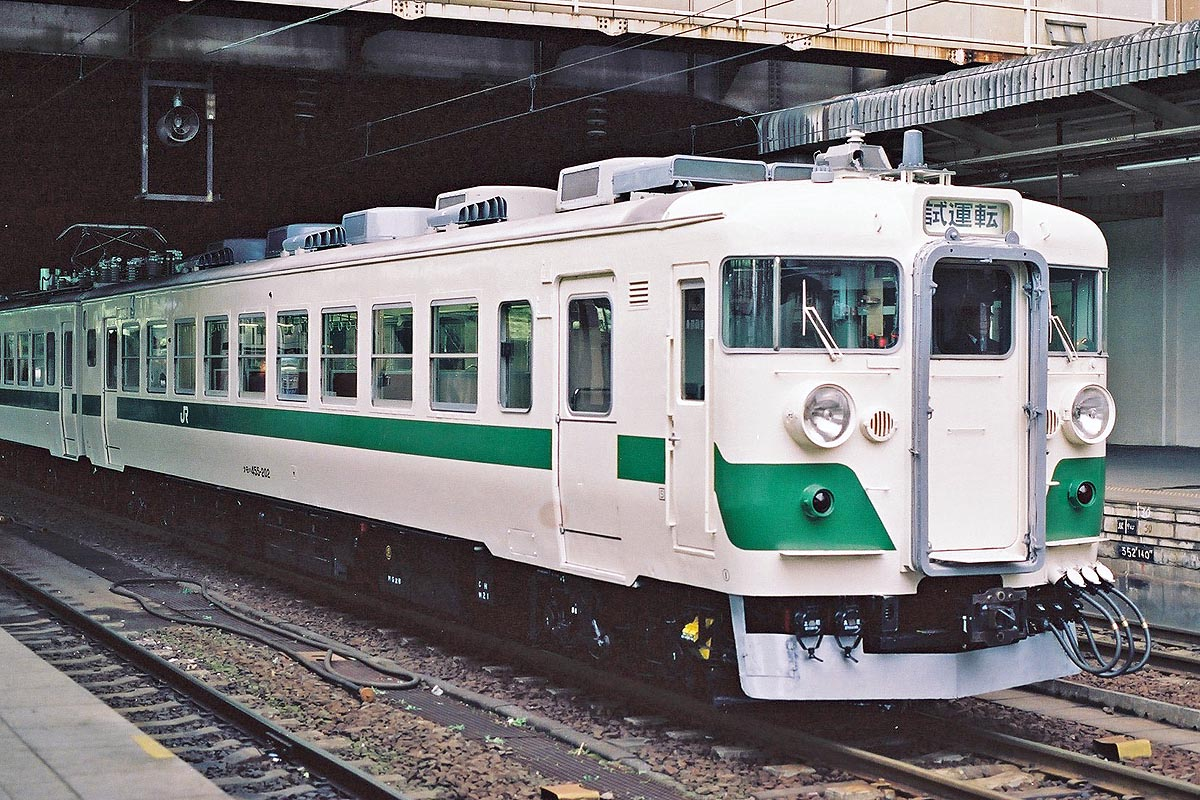
JR East KuMoHa 455–202, March 1989

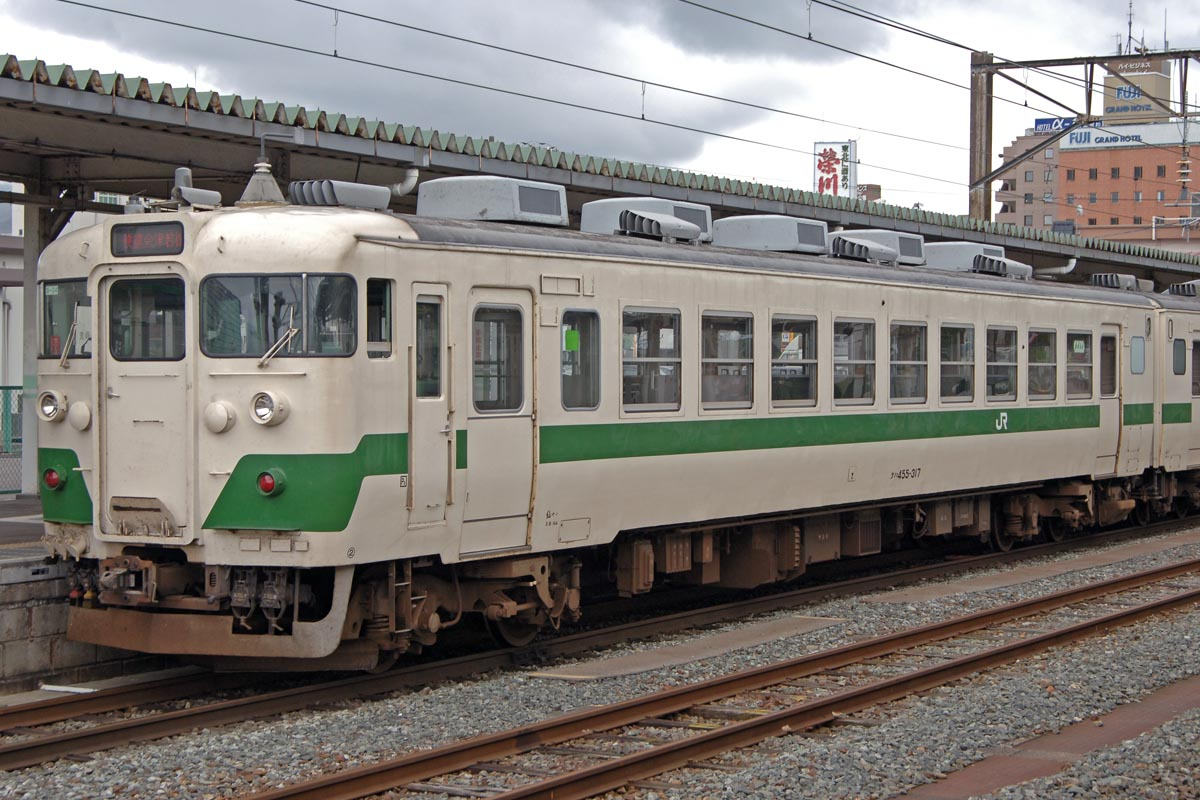
JR East KuHa 455–317, July 2006

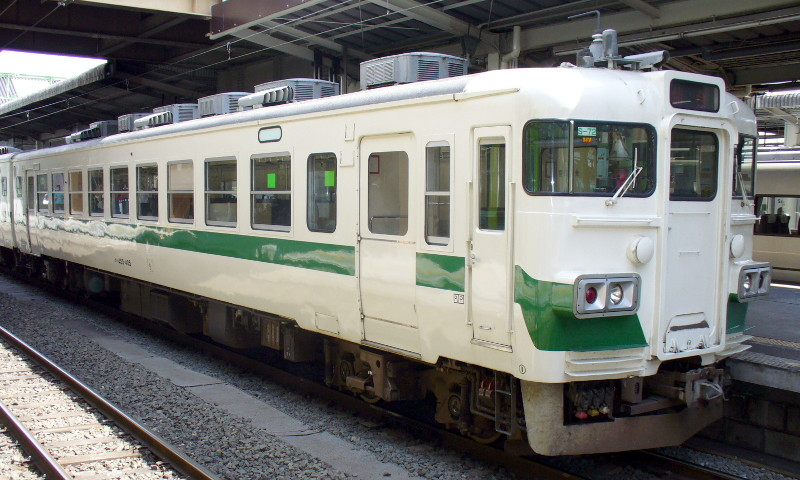
JR East KuHa 455–405, April 2007

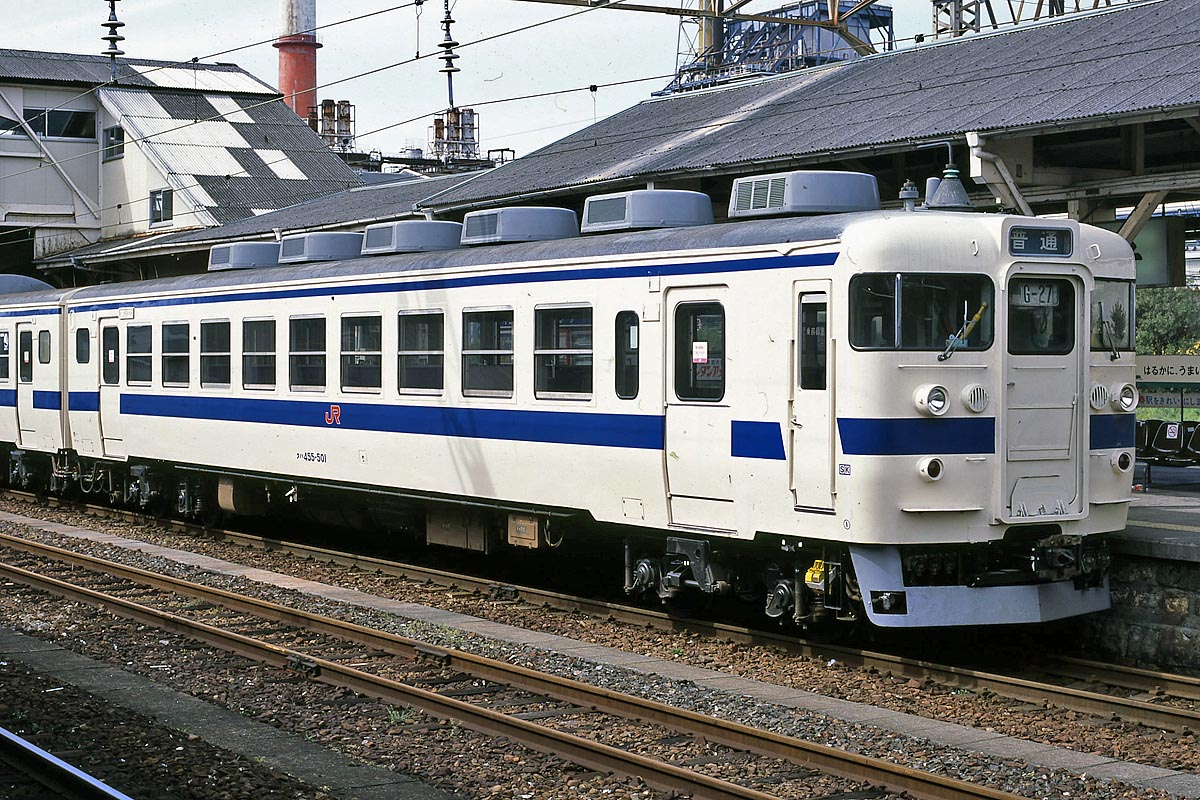
JR Kyushu KuHa 455–501 in a mixed 475/455 series set, March 2002

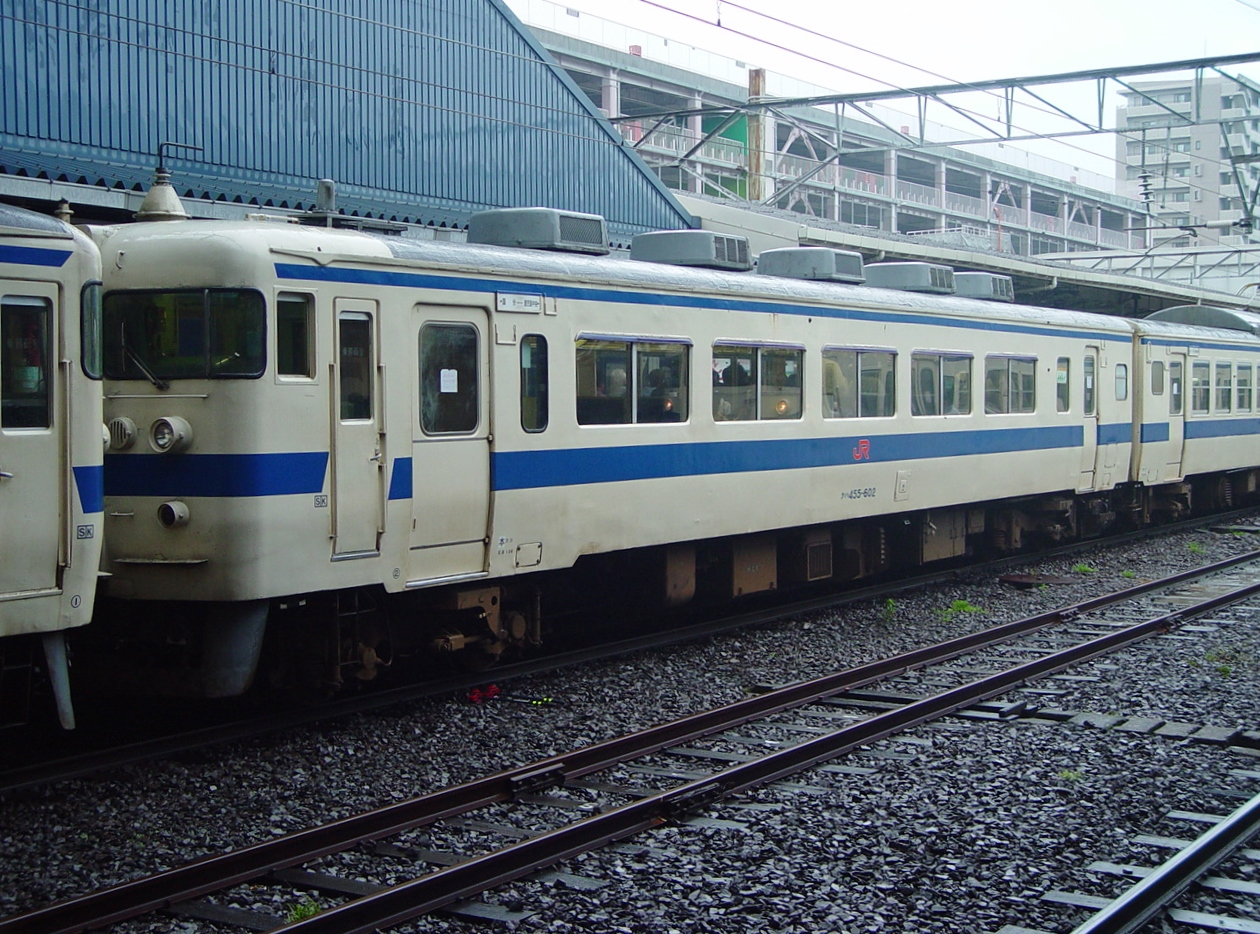
JR Kyushu KuHa 455–605 in a mixed 475/455 series set, May 2006

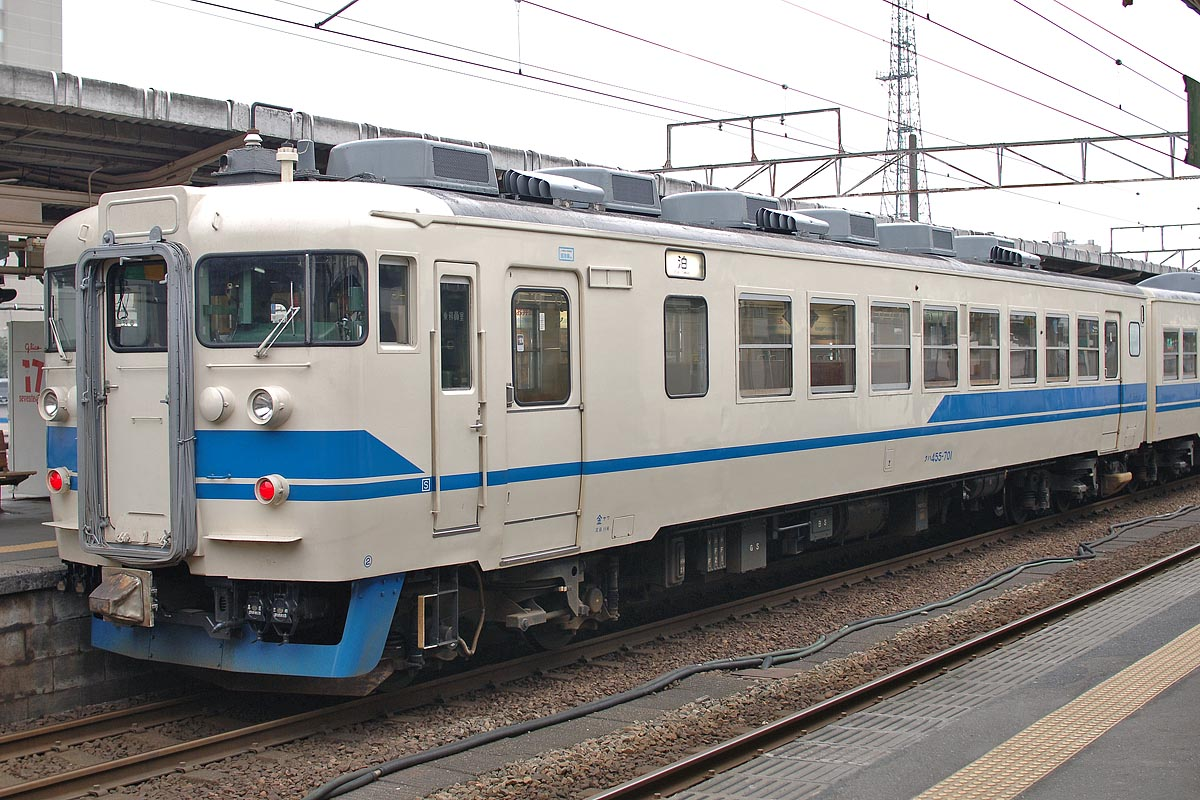
JR-West KuHa 455–701 in a mixed 413/455 series set, April 2006

== Formations ==
As of 1 October 2019, JR-West operates 2 KuHa 455-700 cars. These cars are included in mixed 413/455 series three-car sets based at Kanazawa Depot and used on the Nanao Line. They are formed as shown below.

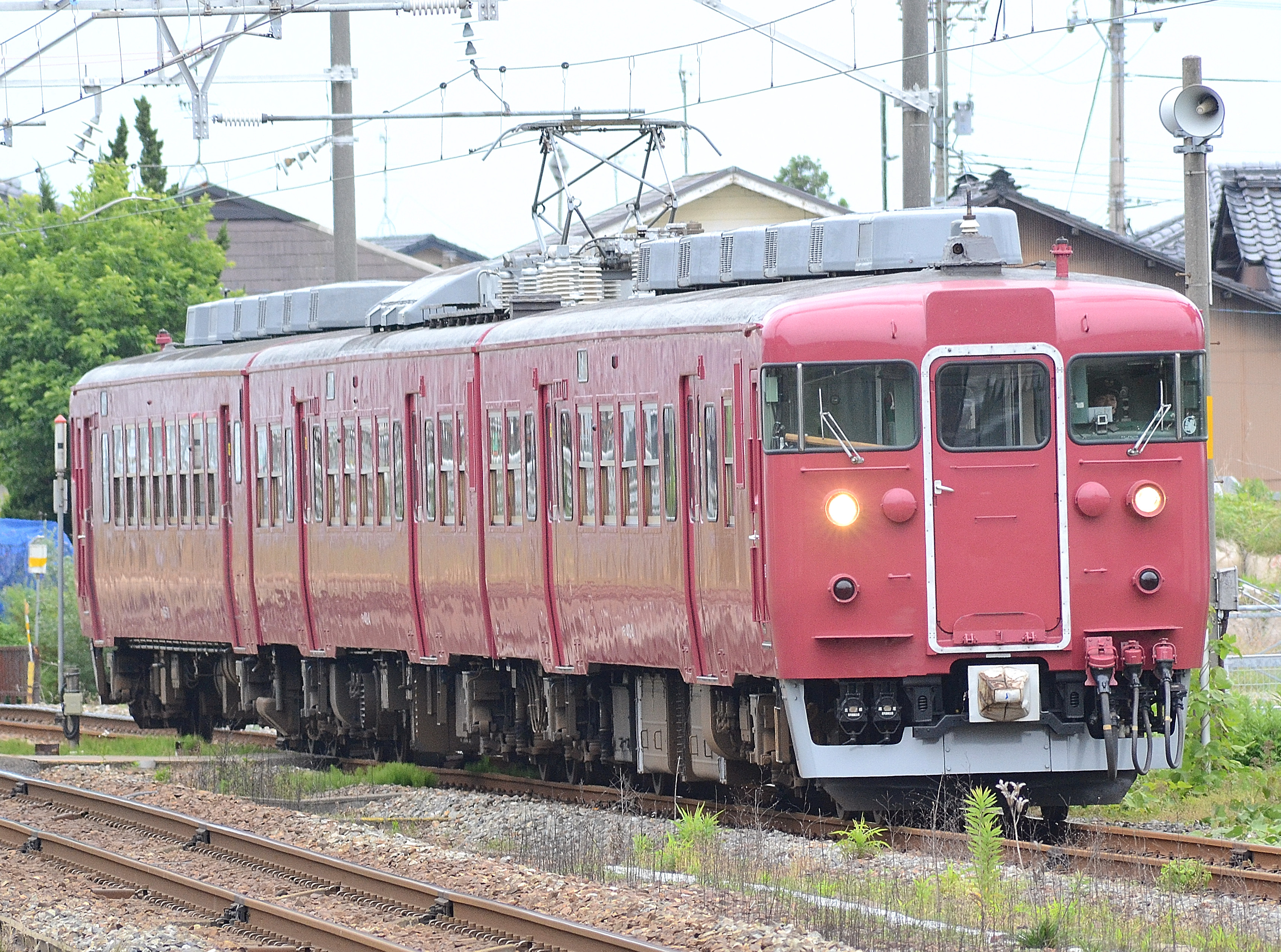
413/455 series set B04 painted in madder red Nanao Line livery

Designation	Mc	M'	Tc'
Numbering	KuMoHa 413	MoHa 412	KuHa 455-700

- The MoHa 412 car is fitted with one PS21 lozenge-type pantograph.
- Set B11 includes 413–100 series cars KuMoHa 413-101 and MoHa 412–101.

=== Past formations ===
As of October 1, 2013, JR-West operated 16 KuHa 455 cars (including two KuHa 455-700 cars), included in mixed 413/455 and 475/455 series three-car sets based at Kanazawa Depot and used on the Hokuriku Main Line. They were formed as shown below.

=== 413 series sets B04 and B11 ===
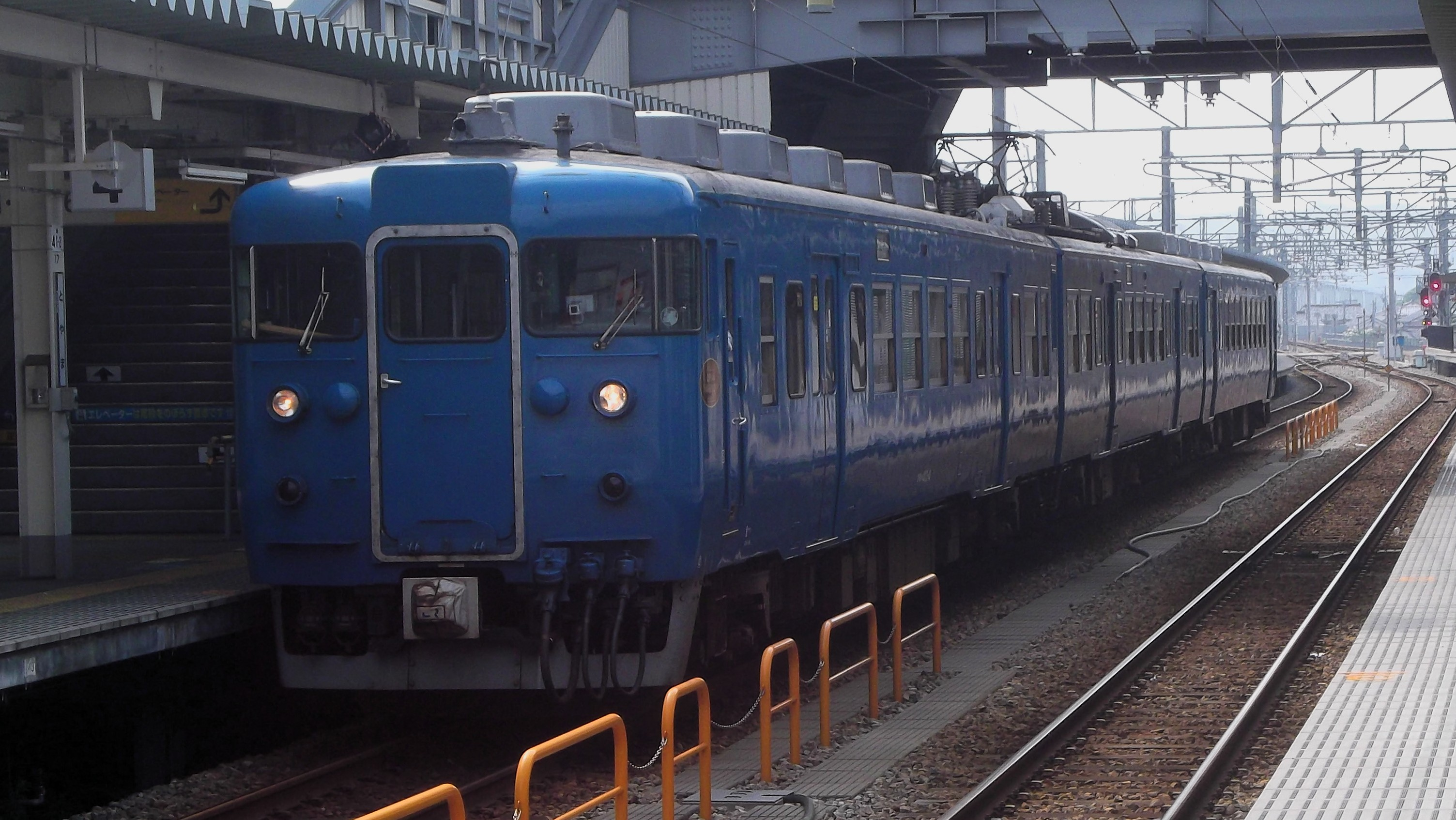
413/455 series set B04 in July 2013, with its KuHa 455 driving car visible at the rear end

Designation	Mc	M'	Tc'
Numbering	KuMoHa 413	MoHa 412	KuHa 455-700

- In March 2013, these sets were reallocated to the Nanao Line.

=== 475 series sets A05 and A26 ===
Designation	Mc	M'	Tc'
Numbering	KuMoHa 475	MoHa 474	KuHa 455

- The MoHa 474 car is fitted with one PS21 lozenge-type pantograph.

A typical formation for a combined Bandai (455 series, cars 1 to 6, Ueno - Kitakata) and Iwate (451/453 series, cars 7 to 13, Ueno - Morioka) service as of March 1972 is shown below.

Car No.	1	2	3	4	5	6	7	8	9	10	11	12	13
Numbering	KuHa 455	MoHa 454	KuMoHa 455	SaRo 455	MoHa 454	KuMoHa 455	KuHa 451	SaHaShi 451	MoHa 450	KuMoHa 451	SaRo 455	MoHa 454	KuMoHa 455

JR East 3-car sets (S2 to S51) based at Sendai Depot and used in the Tohoku region until their withdrawal in 2008 were formed as shown below.

Designation	Mc	M'	Tc'
Numbering	KuMoHa 455	MoHa 454	KuHa 455

- The MoHa 454 car was fitted with one PS16 lozenge-type pantograph.

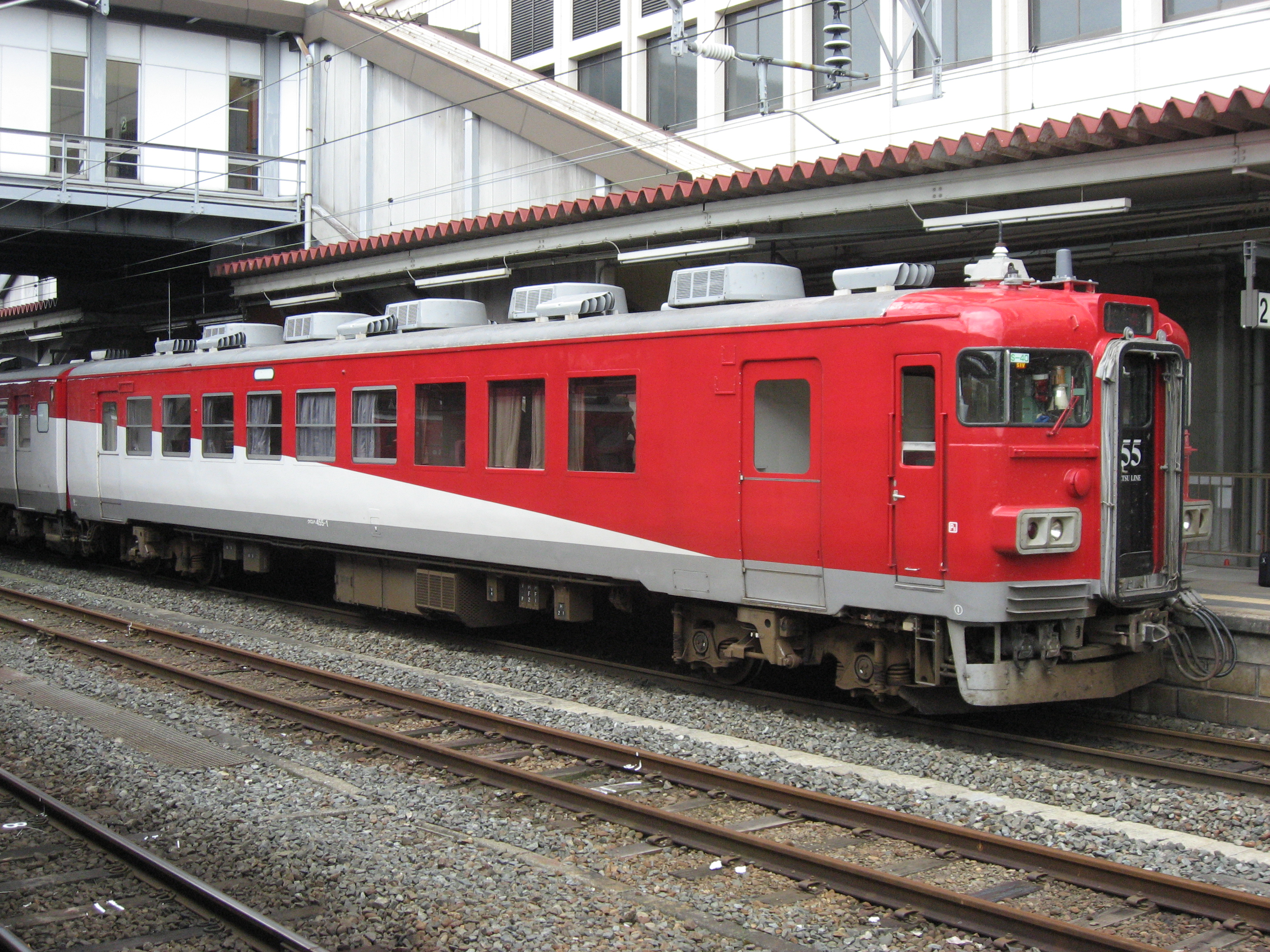
Rebuilt car KuRoHa 455–1 in 2006 with Green car saloon at the outer end

One JR East 3-car set, S40, based at Sendai Depot, was modified in 1999 with a KuRoHa 455 car at the north end including three rows of "Green" car (first class) accommodation arranged 2+2 abreast.

Designation	Mc	M'	Tc'
Numbering	KuRoHa 455-1	MoHa 454-40	KuMoHa 455-40

- The MoHa 454 car was fitted with one PS16 lozenge-type pantograph.

=== Key ===
- KuHa: Standard class driving trailer car
- KuMoHa: Standard class driving motor car
- MoHa: Intermediate motor car
- SaRo: "Green" (first class) trailer car
- SaHaShi: Buffet car

== Interior ==
Designed for use on express services, passenger accommodation consisted of fixed 4-person seating bays.

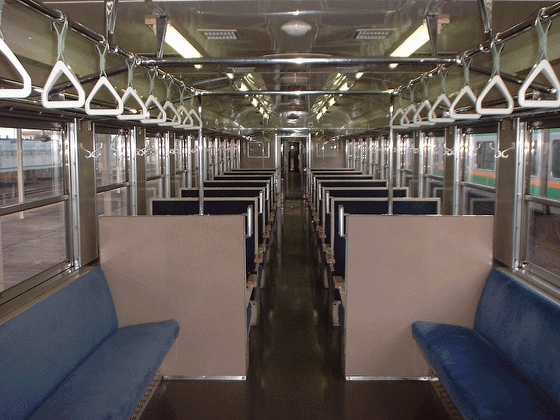
Interior of a JR East set, August 2003

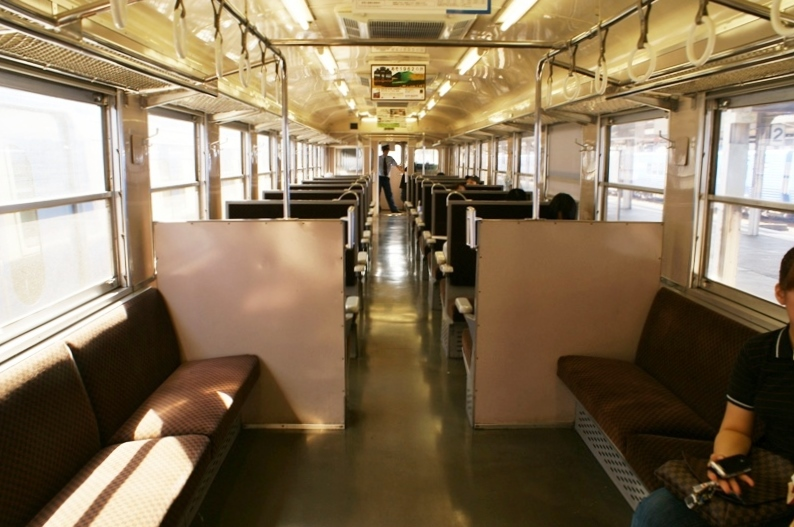
Interior of JR Kyushu KuHa 455-22 included in a 475 series set, July 2006

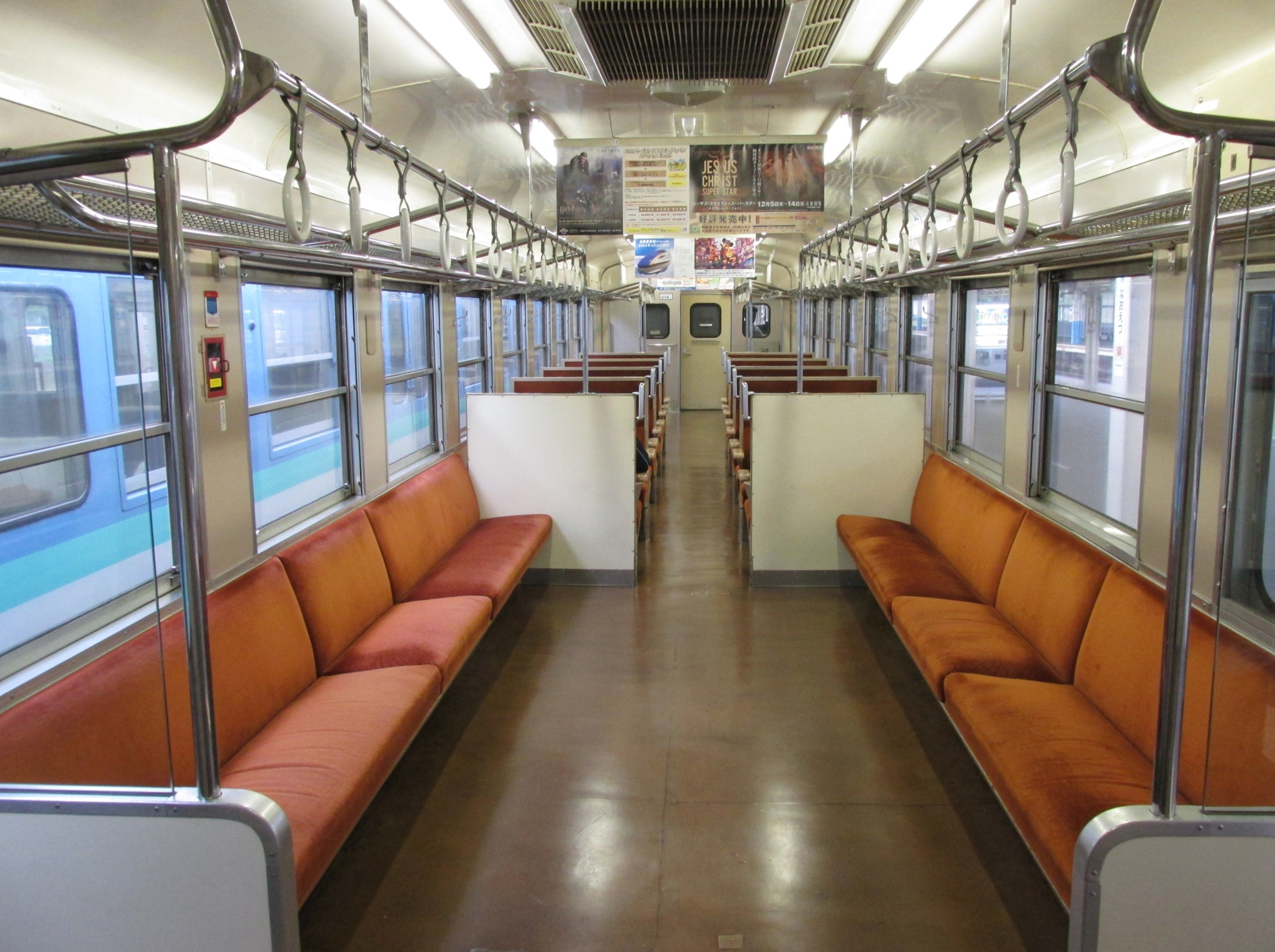
The interior of JR-West KuHa 455-702 included in 413 series set B11, October 2014

== Liveries ==
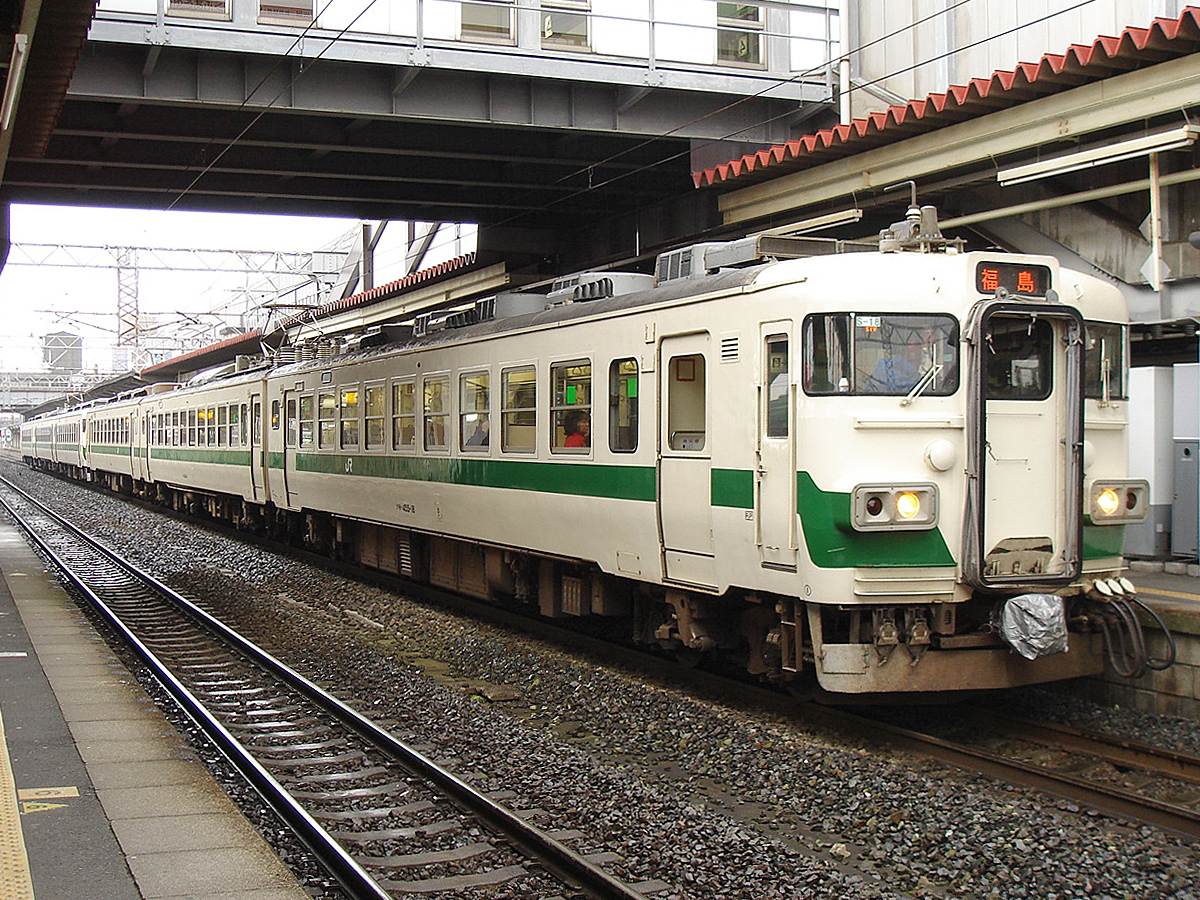
A JR East 455 series set in Tohoku livery in December 2006

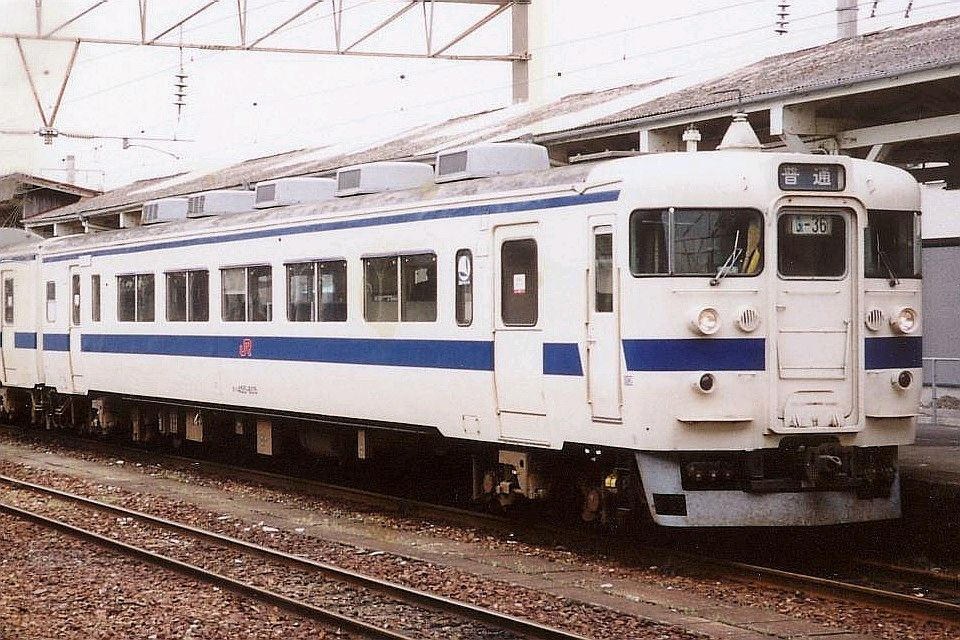
A JR Kyushu 455 series car in Kyushu livery in April 2000

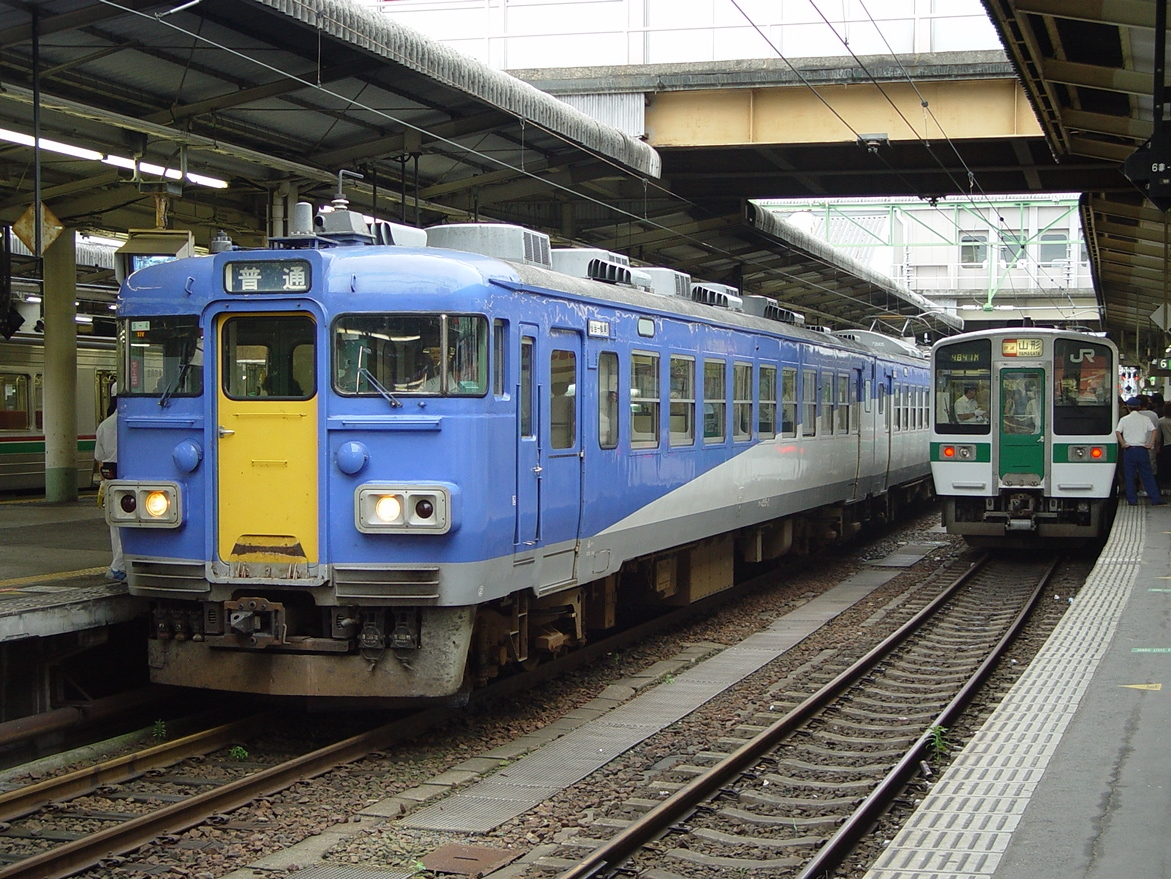
JR East 455 series set S-4 in Senzan Line livery in August 2002

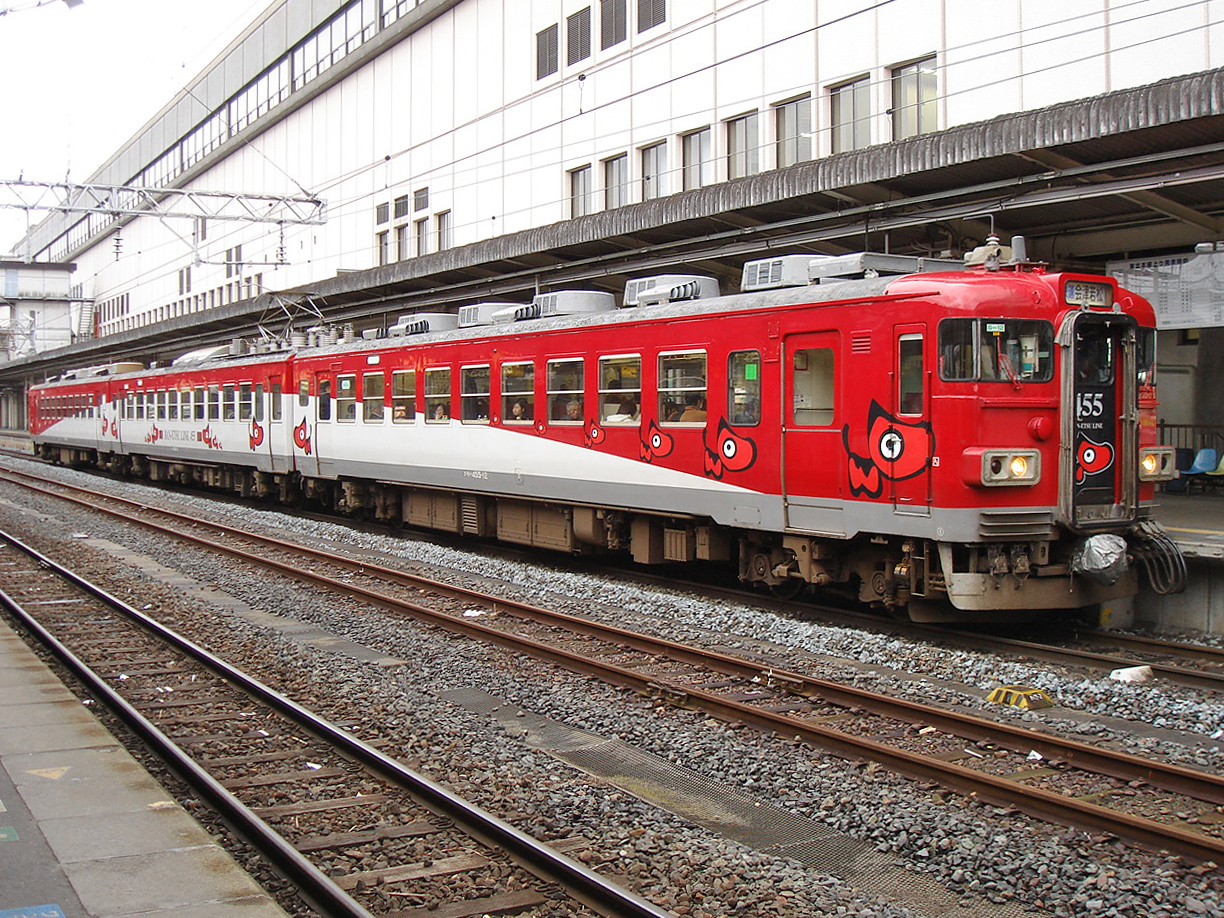
A JR East 455 series set in Banetsu West Line livery in December 2006

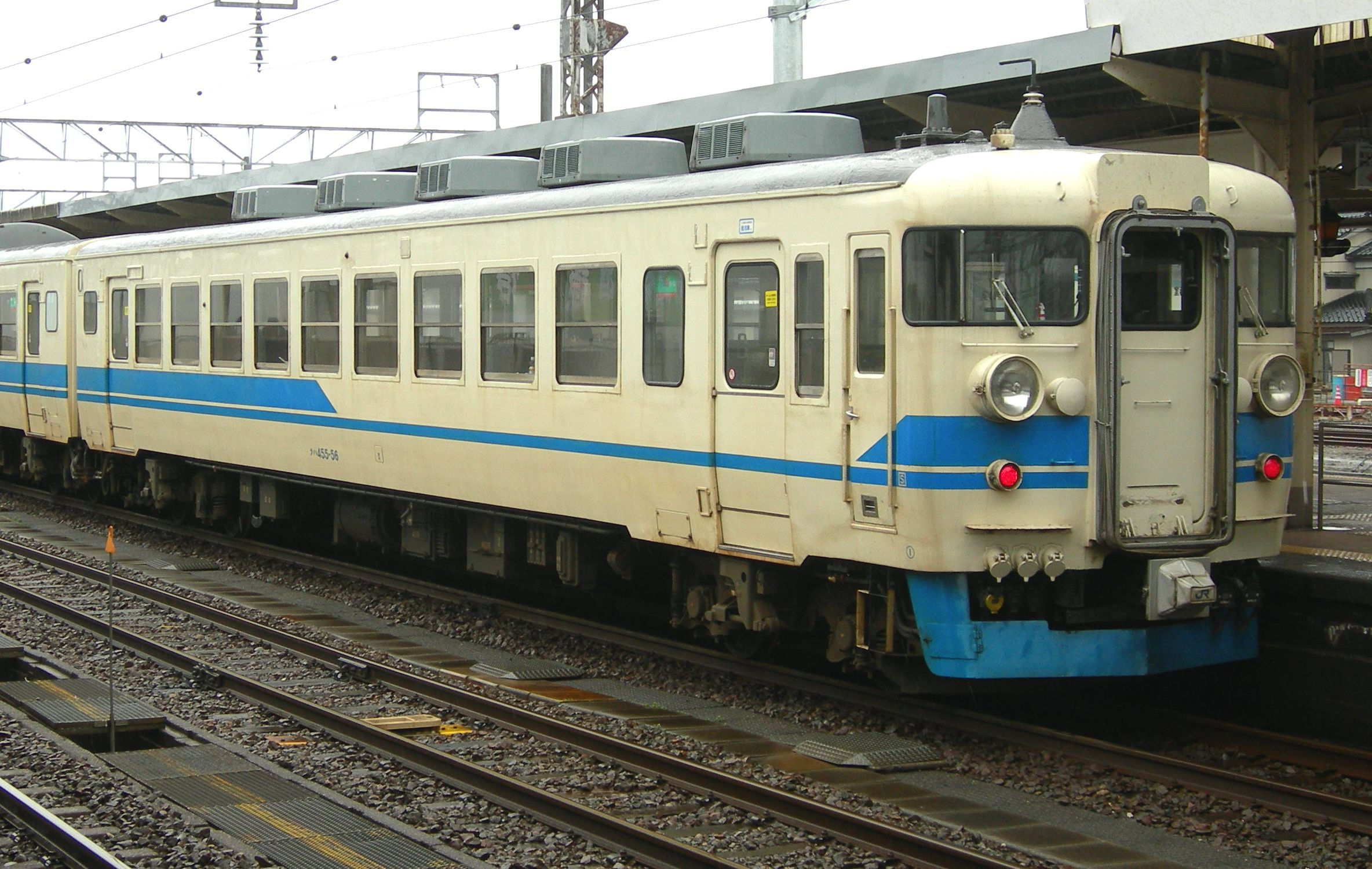
A JR-West 455 series car in "Hokuriku" livery in March 2010

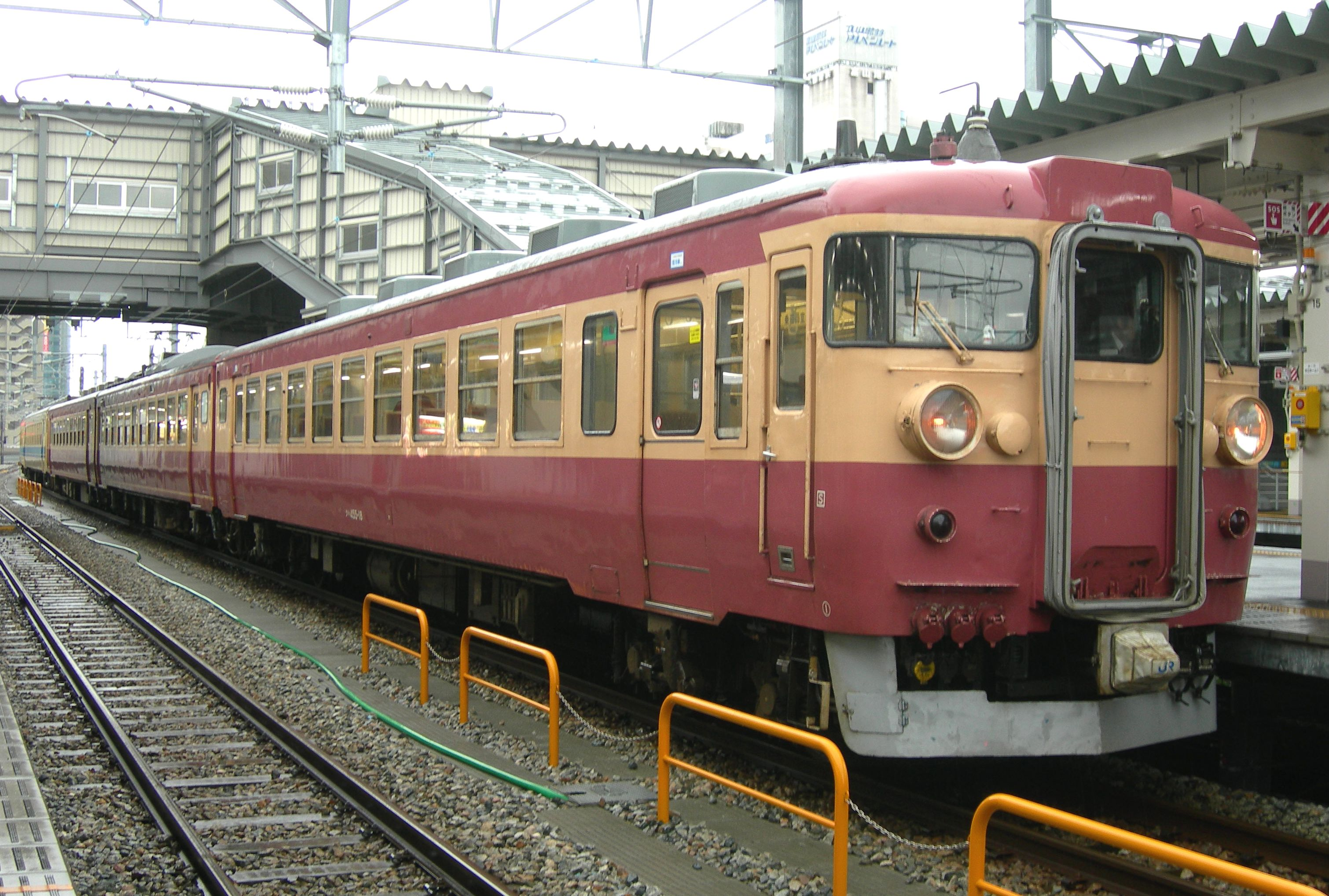
A JR-West 455 series car repainted into original JNR express livery in March 2010

== History ==
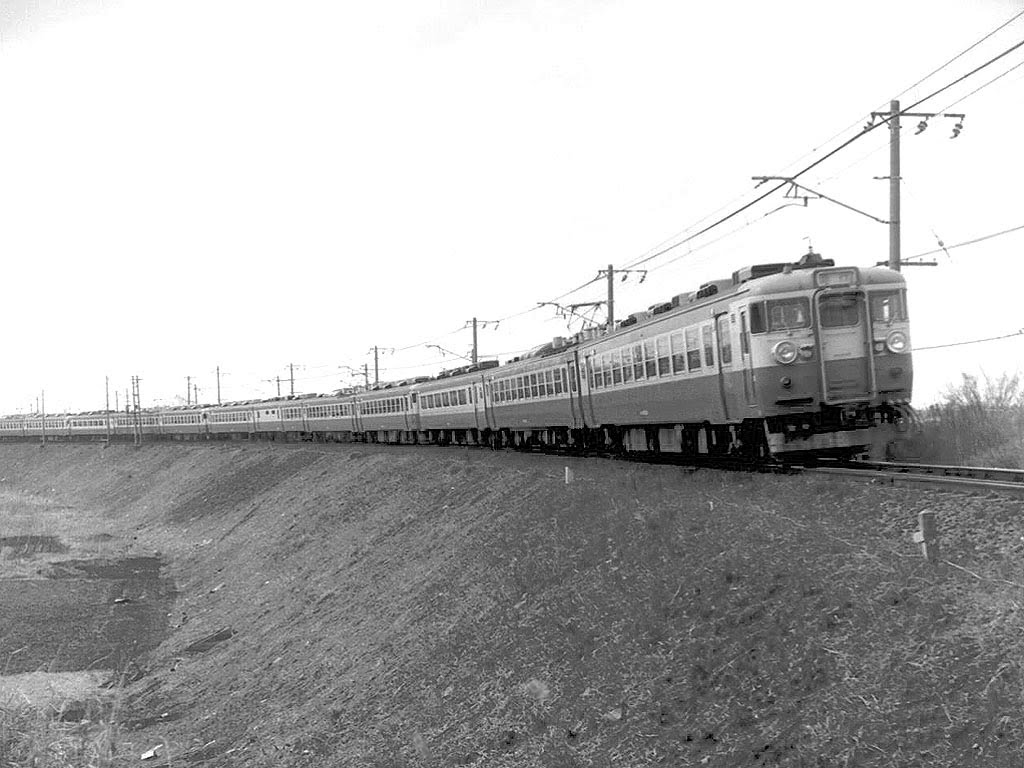
A 455 series formation on a Matsushima express service

The 455 series trains were first introduced from the start of the 1 October 1965 revised timetable, operating on Iwate and Kitakami express services between Ueno in Tokyo and Morioka in the north-east of Japan, and also on Matsushima services between Ueno and Sendai.

From 1 July 1967, 455 series trains were introduced on new Bandai express services operating on the Banetsu West Line. From 1 October 1968, with the completion of AC electrification of the route between Fukushima and Sendai via the Ou Main Line and Senzan Line, 455 series trains were introduced on Zaō services operating between Ueno and Yamagata.

From the late 1960s, JNR was beginning to install air-conditioning on its trains, and 455 series cars built from June 1968 were designed to allow air-conditioning to be added easily at a later date. Air-conditioning was subsequently retrofitted between 1969 and 1975.

With the opening of the Tohoku Shinkansen, the number of express services in the region were cut back from the start of the 15 November 1982 timetable revision, and discontinued by March 1985. JR East 455 series sets were reassigned to local services, and withdrawn by 2008.

== Preserved examples ==
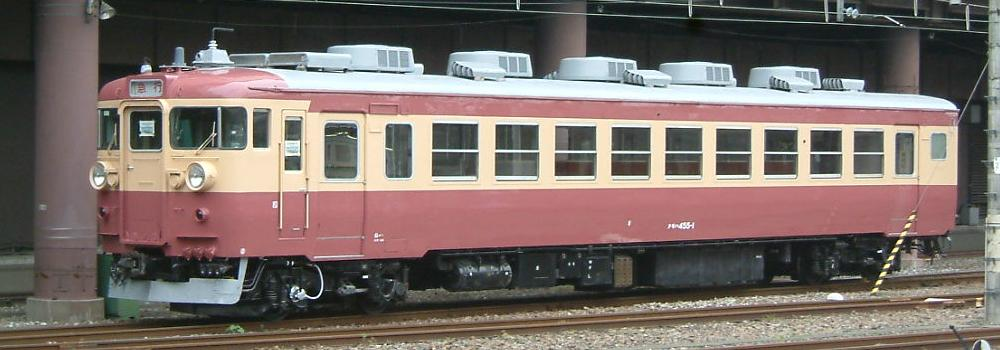
Preserved car KuMoHa 455–1 in 2007 before being moved to the Railway Museum in Saitama

As of 2012, three 455 series EMU cars are preserved, all at the Railway Museum in Saitama Prefecture.

- KuMoHa 455-1 (restored in original JNR express livery)
- KuHa 455-2 (in cream/green livery, used as a rest area)
- MoHa 454-4 (in cream/green livery, used as a rest area)
