= Toyota 86 =

Japanese sports car

Toyota 86 / Subaru BRZ
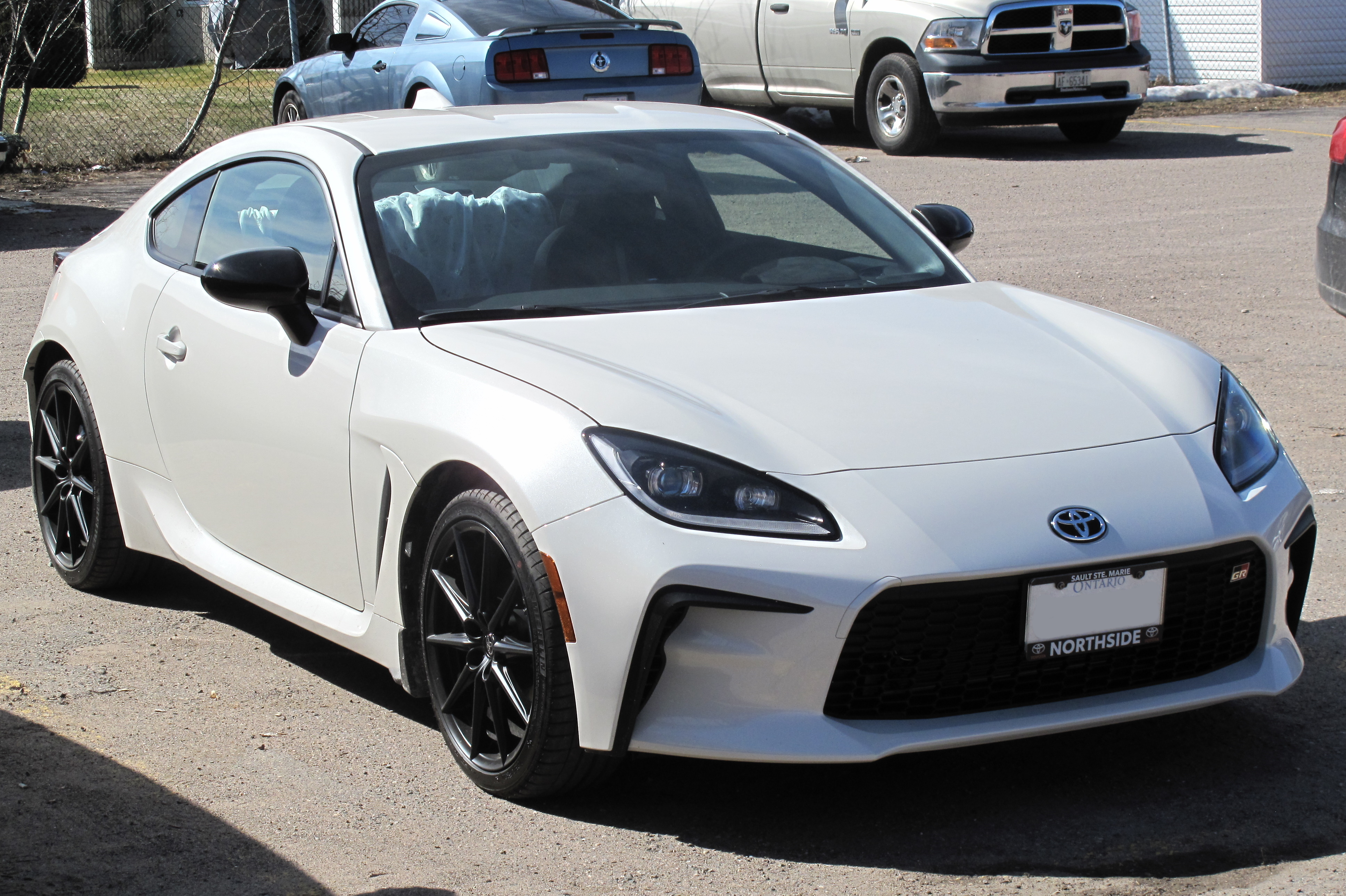
- 2022 Toyota GR86 Premium (ZN8, US)

Overview
- Manufacturer: Toyota; Subaru
- Also called: Subaru BRZ; Toyota GT86 (Europe, 2012–2021); Scion FR-S (North America, 2012–2016); Toyota GR86 (2021–present); Toyota FT86 (Brunei, Nicaragua and Jamaica)
- Production: January 2012 – present
- Model years: 2013–present
- Assembly: Japan: Ōta, Gunma (Subaru Corp. Gunma Plant)

Body and chassis
- Class: Sports car (S)
- Body style: 2-door fastback coupé
- Layout: Front-engine, rear-wheel-drive

The Toyota 86 and the Subaru BRZ are 2+2 sports cars jointly developed by Toyota and Subaru, manufactured at Subaru's Ōta, Gunma assembly plant.

The 2+2 fastback coupé has a naturally aspirated boxer engine, front-engined, rear-wheel-drive configuration, 53/47 front/rear weight balance and low centre of gravity; it was inspired by Toyota's earlier AE86, a small, light, front-engine/rear-drive Corolla variant widely popular for Showroom Stock, Group A, Group N, Rally, Club and drift racing.

For the first-generation model, Toyota marketed the sports car as the 86 in Asia, Australia, North America (from August 2016), South Africa, and South America; as the Toyota GT86 in Europe; as the 86 and GT86 in New Zealand; as the Toyota FT86 in Brunei, Nicaragua and Jamaica and as the Scion FR-S (2012–2016) in the United States and Canada.

The second-generation model is marketed by Toyota as the GR86 as part of the Gazoo Racing (GR) family.

== Name ==
The development code of the 2+2 was 086A and the eight six (Hachi-Roku in Japanese), references the historic 1983 to 1987 AE86.

== Pre-launch concept cars ==
Initial layout and design elements for the 86 were presented by Toyota using its "FT" (Future Toyota) concept car nomenclature. The first was the Toyota FT-HS, which was presented at the North American International Auto Show in 2007. It had a front engine, rear-wheel drive layout and 2+2 seating and was powered by a V6 engine with hybrid electric assistance. In 2008, Toyota bought 16.5% of Fuji Heavy Industries, which includes the Subaru automotive brand. Toyota, led by project leader Tetsuya Tada, then invited Subaru to partner in the project, by co-developing the new D-4S boxer engine. The offer, which conflicted with Subaru's reputation for high performance all-wheel drive (AWD) cars, was rejected. The project came to a six-month halt before Toyota invited journalists and Subaru engineers to test a developmental prototype. Following the test, Subaru agreed to become further involved in development.

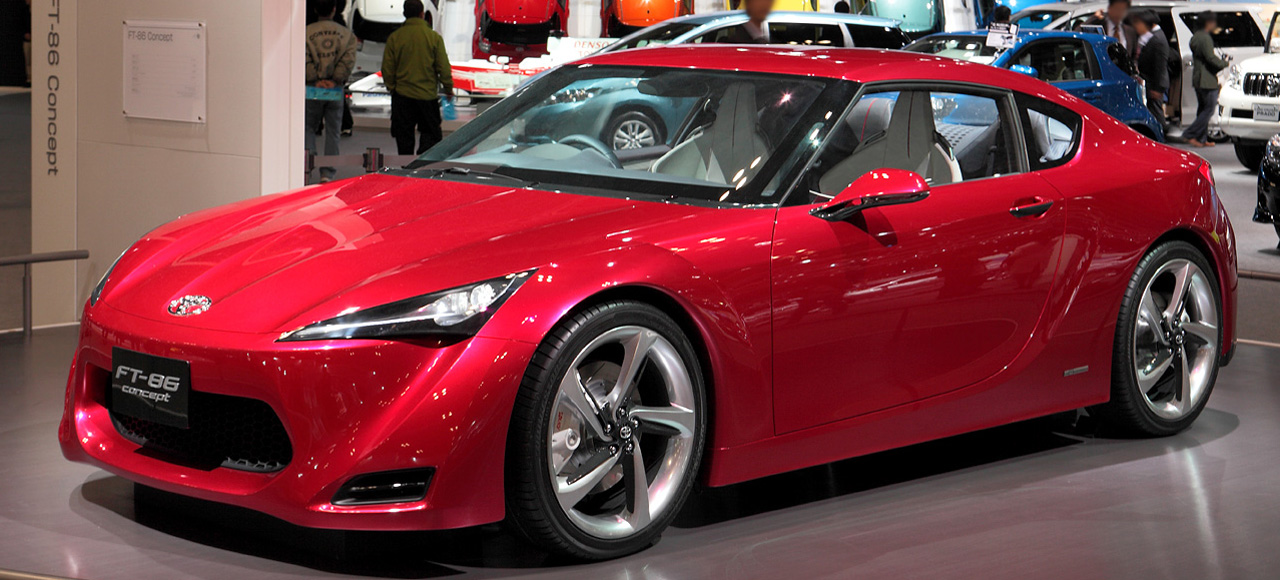
Toyota FT-86 Concept (2009)

The collaboration produced a concept car, the FT-86 Concept, which debuted at the Tokyo Motor Show in October 2009. Smaller than the FT-HS, the design of the FT-86 was further refined by Toyota's ED^{2} design studio while the hybrid V6 powerplant was replaced by the new D-4S boxer. Subaru provided the chassis, modifying it from their Impreza. The custom red paint was based on the backside of a Japanese macaque. Classic Toyota sports cars such as the AE86, Celica and Supra were cited as inspirations for the concept.

At the 2010 Tokyo Motor Show, Toyota launched its G Sports line of aftermarket accessories, along with the FT-86 G Sports concept car. It featured G Sports carbon fibre panels, a vented bonnet, rear wing, 19 in (48 cm) wheels, Recaro race seats, and an interior rollcage. The D-4S engine also added a turbocharger.

In 2011, Toyota and Subaru unveiled five near-production concept cars to show their progress with the project. The first, known as the FT-86 II Concept, was unveiled at the Geneva Motor Show in March 2011. ED^{2} refined the design of the initial FT-86, by developing new front and rear fascias, and marginally increasing the dimensions of the concept. At the same show, Subaru unveiled a transparent silhouette of the car showing the new D-4S boxer engine and displayed the "Boxer Sports Car Architecture".

Scion followed in April 2011 at the New York International Auto Show with the FR-S Sports Coupé Concept, co-developed with aftermarket tuner Five Axis. Another semi-transparent Subaru concept, known as the BRZ Prologue, was shown at the Frankfurt Motor Show that September, followed in November at the Los Angeles Auto Show by the BRZ Concept STi, the first full mock-up of Subaru's version of the 86 with input from Subaru Tecnica International (STI).

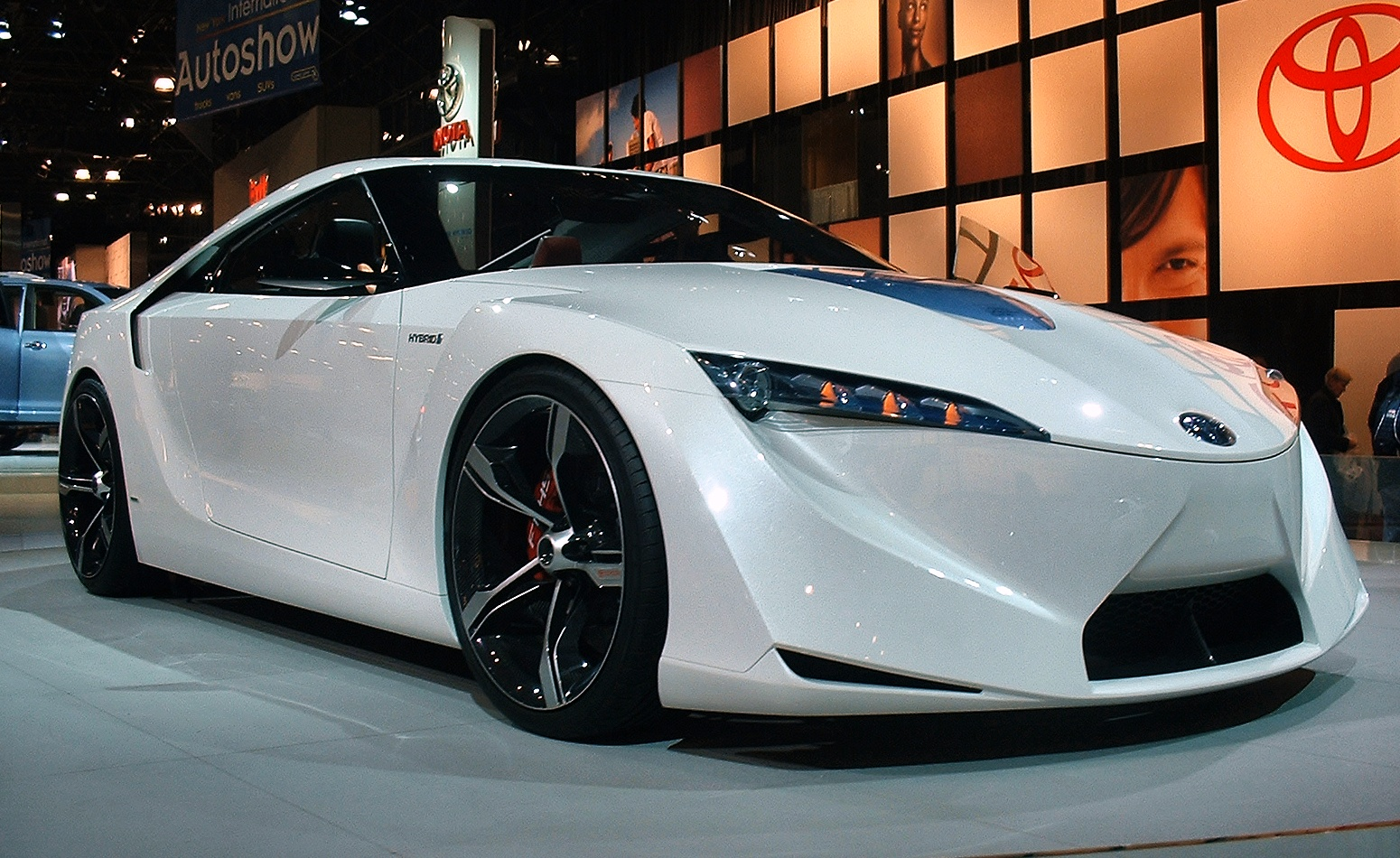
Toyota FT-HS (2007)

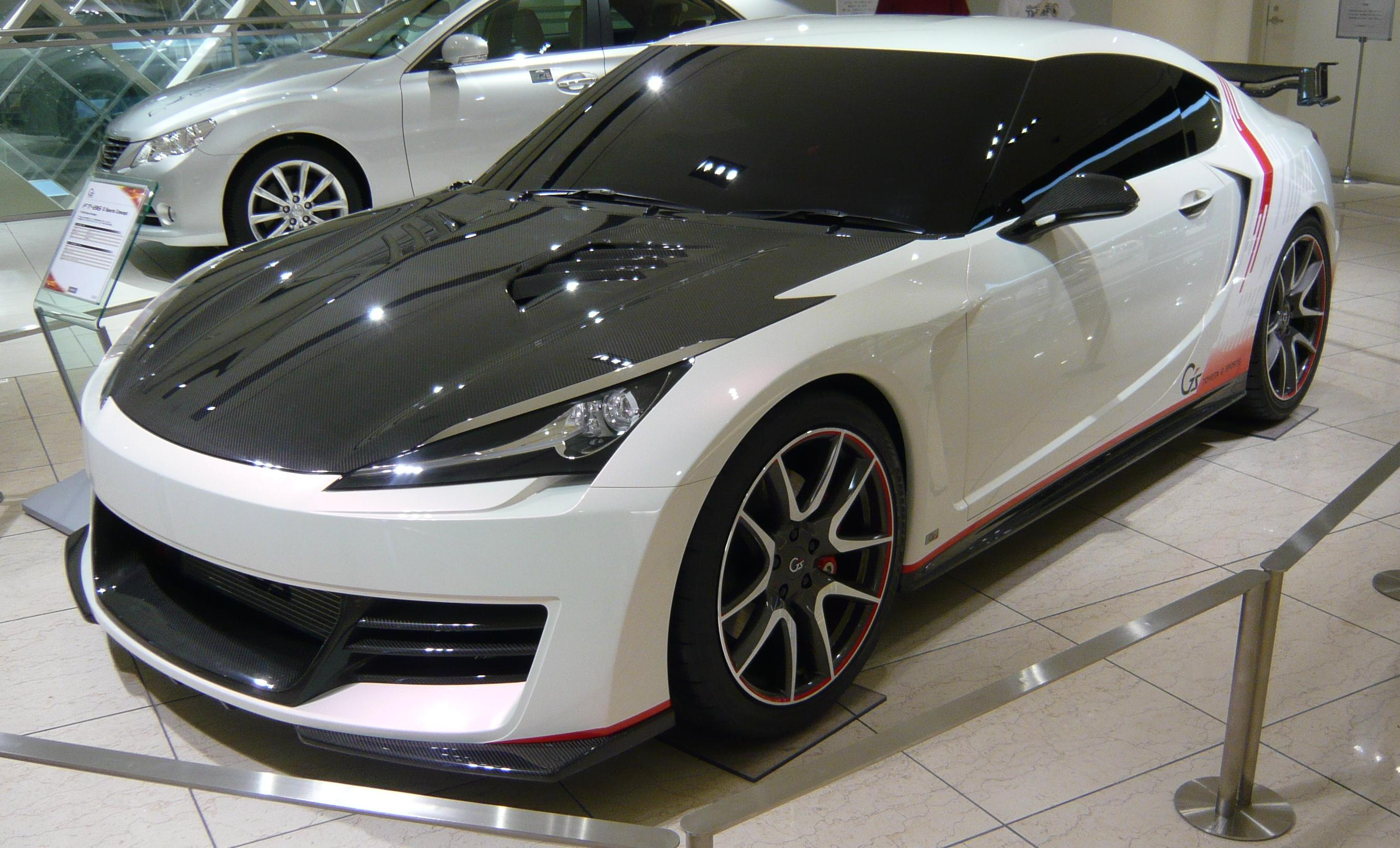
Toyota FT-86 G Sports (2010)

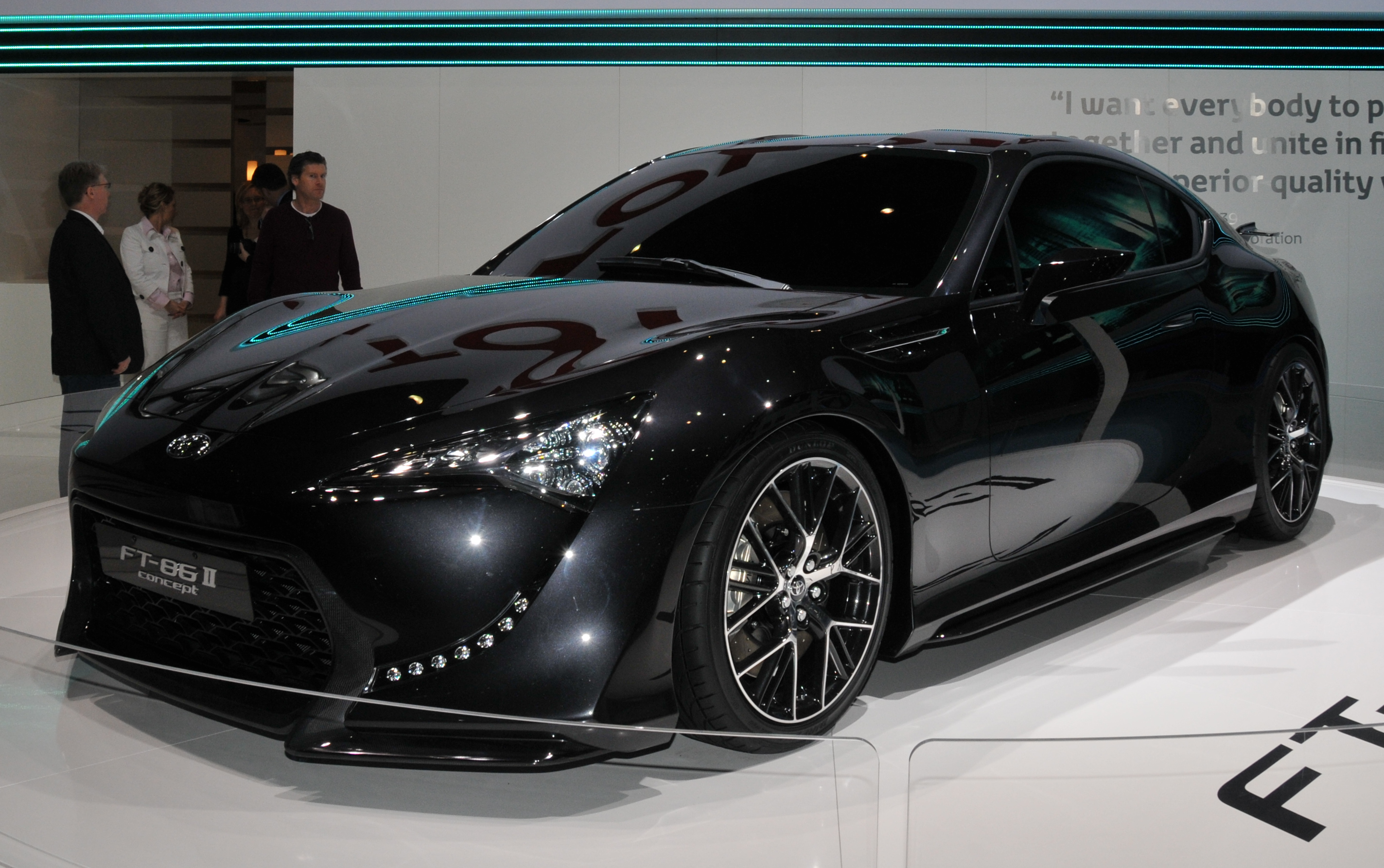
Toyota FT-86 II (2011)

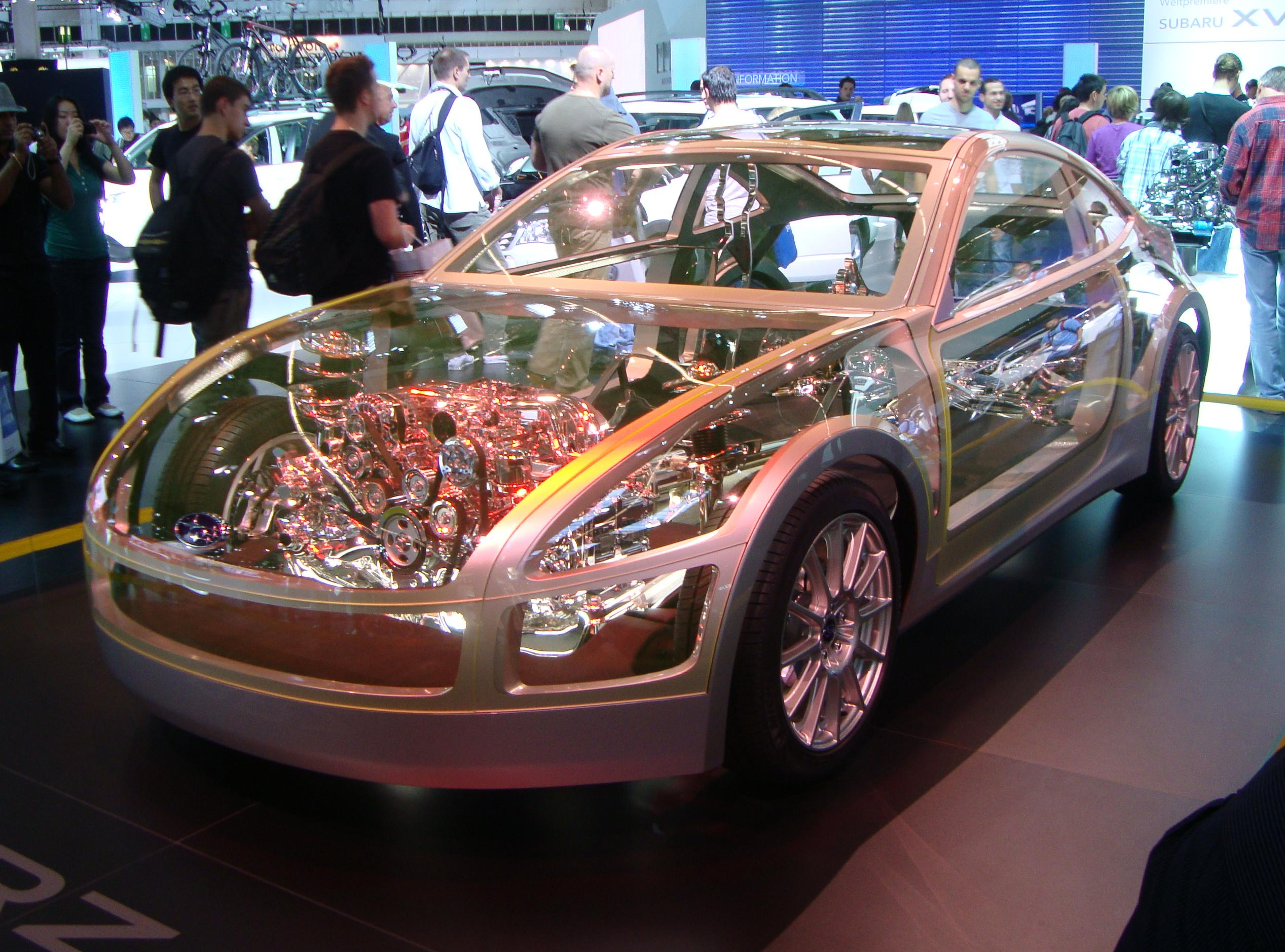
Subaru BRZ Prologue (2011)

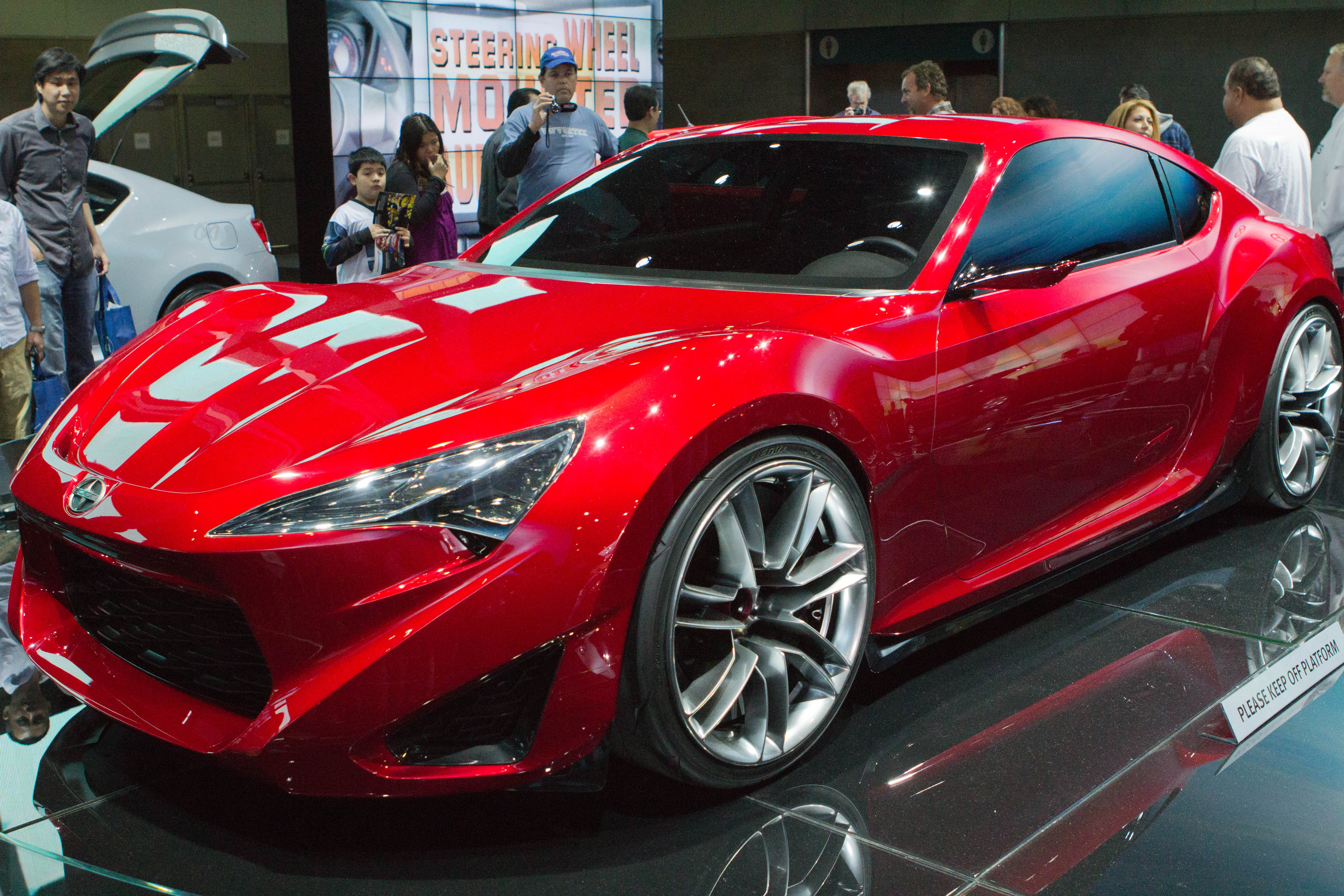
Scion FR-S Sports Coupé (2011)

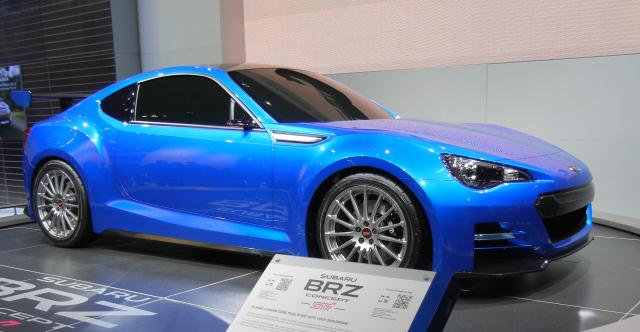
Subaru BRZ Concept STi (2011)

== First generation (ZN6/ZC6; 2012) ==
First generation
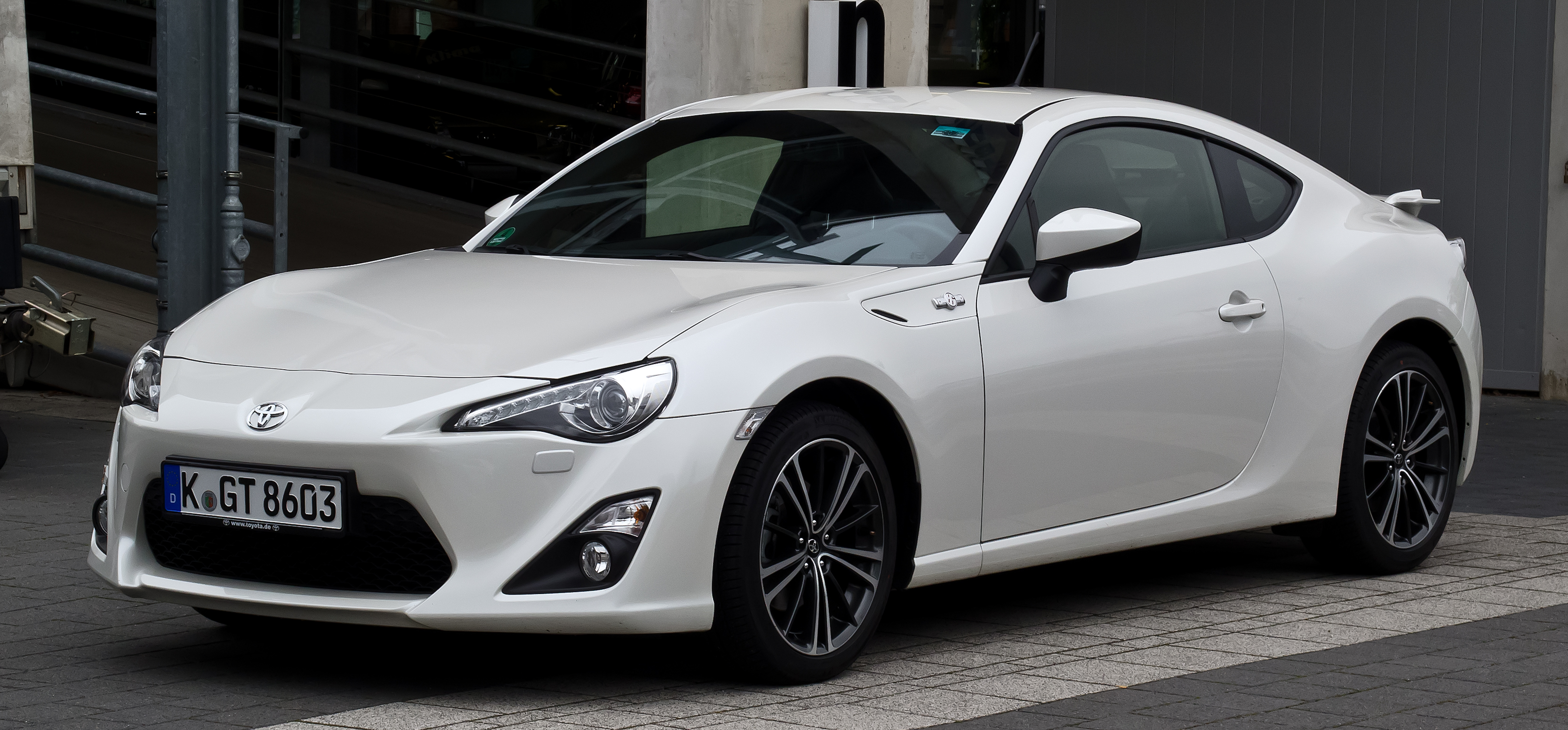
- Toyota GT86 (Europe; pre-facelift)

Overview
- Model code: ZN6 (Toyota/Scion); ZC6 (Subaru)
- Also called: Subaru BRZ; Toyota GT86 (Europe); Scion FR-S (North America, 2012–2016)
- Production: January 2012 – March 2021 (86/GT86); January 2012 – July 2020 (BRZ)
- Model years: 2013–2020 (North America)
- Designer: Kenji Kido, Tatsuya Sonoda, Kosuke Kubo, Takanori Ito, Ryota Nakai, Hiroyuki Kobayashi and Kouhei Kobayashi (Toyota 86 exterior)

Powertrain
- Engine: 2.0 L 4U-GSE/FA20 H4
- Power output: 200–207 PS (147–152 kW; 197–204 hp)
- Transmission: 6-speed Toyota TL70 (Aisin AZ6) manual; 6-speed A960E automatic

Dimensions
- Wheelbase: 2,570 mm (101.2 in)
- Length: Standard 86/BRZ/FR-S: 4,240 mm (166.9 in); Subaru BRZ tS: 4,260 mm (167.7 in); Toyota 86 special models: 4,280 mm (168.5 in) (GR Sport); 4,285 mm (168.7 in) (14R); 4,290 mm (168.9 in) (GR/GRMN); 4,310 mm (169.7 in) (Style Cb); 4,335 mm (170.7 in) (14R-60)
- Width: 1,775 mm (69.9 in) (standard 86/BRZ/FR-S models); 1,790 mm (70.5 in) (Toyota 86 GR)
- Height: 1,285–1,320 mm (50.6–52.0 in)
- Kerb weight: Toyota 86: 1,190–1,298 kg (2,624–2,862 lb); Subaru BRZ: 1,190–1,270 kg (2,624–2,800 lb); Scion FR-S: 1,251–1,273 kg (2,758–2,806 lb)

Chronology
- Predecessor: Scion tC (North America)

=== Development and production ===
The production Toyota 86 debuted at the December 2011 Tokyo Motor Show. Its development was led by chief engineer Tetsuya Tada. All variants are built at Subaru's Gunma Main Plant, with the first cars assembled on 2 February 2012 before sales began in March and deliveries in April. 7,000 orders were placed for the Toyota 86 in the first month of production, while Subaru took in 3,500 orders.

In the United States, Scion were allocated 10,000 units of the 2013 model year (MY13) production, while Subaru was limited to only 6,000 units.

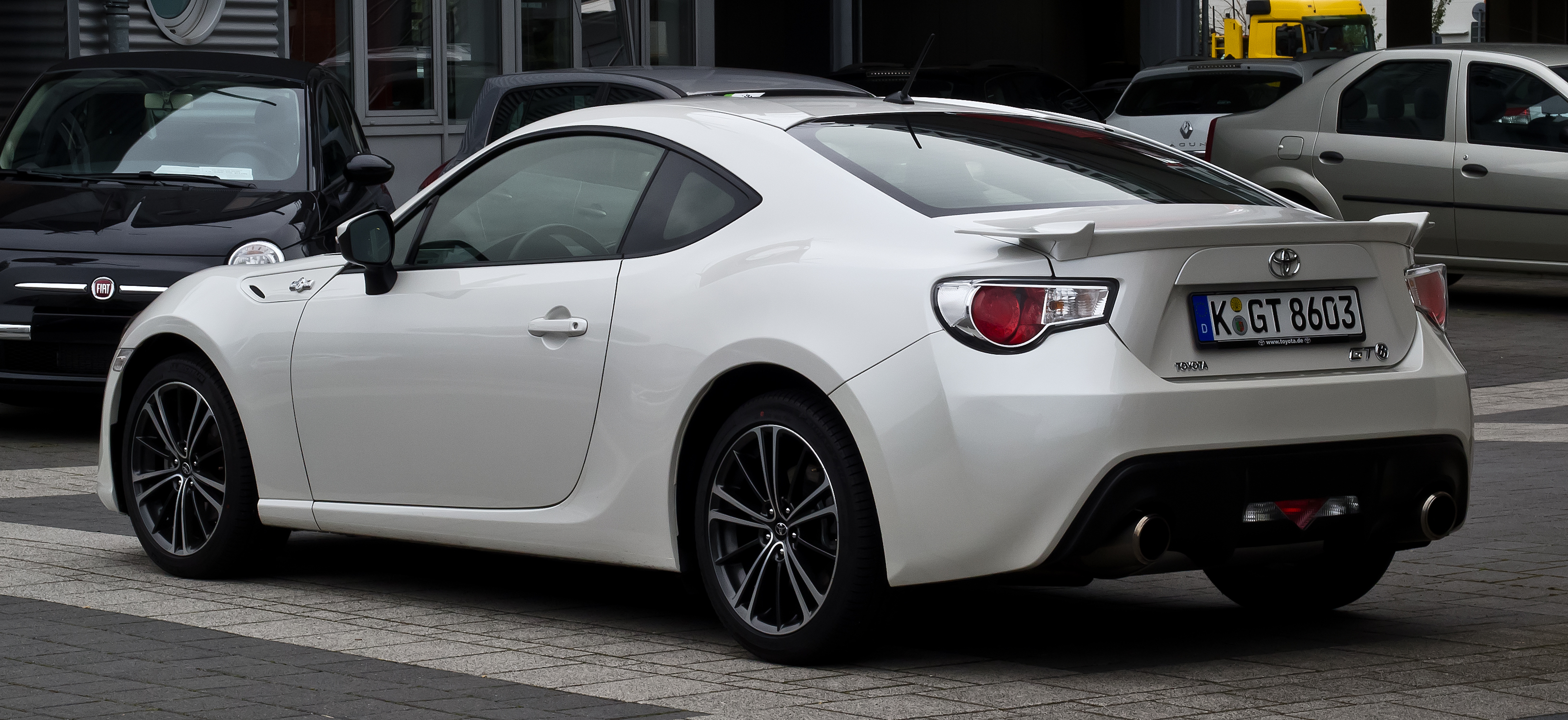
Rear (Germany; pre-facelift)

==== Engineering ====
The 86's low-weight design uses an aluminium bonnet, a fixed roof, and a boot as opposed to a hatchback. To improve driving dynamics, the boxer engine is mounted low in a front engine / rear drive layout, yielding a weight distribution of 53% in front and 47% in the rear and a low centre of mass height.

The 86's engine, known by the Toyota code 4U-GSE and Subaru code FA20, is a naturally aspirated engine that uses Subaru's flat-four engine design, with the addition of Toyota's D-4S injection system, which uses Gasoline direct injection (GDI). With its front-engine, rear-wheel-drive layout, its engine runs on 98 RON (premium unleaded) fuel and features a compression ratio of 12.5:1 with a bore and stroke of 86 mm (3.39 in) for a total displacement of 2.0 L; 121.9 cu in (1,998 cc) that results in 200 PS (197 bhp; 147 kW) at 7,000 rpm and 151 lb⋅ft (205 N⋅m) of torque at 6,400 rpm.

The 86, BRZ and FR-S are offered with two six-speed transmissions: an in-house developed Toyota TL70 manual gearbox (based on Aisin AI's AZ6) and an Aisin-Warner A960E automatic transmission, which is modified from that used on the Lexus IS 250. The latter uses a traditional wet torque converter design, but its software has been engineered to mimic the response of a dual-clutch transmission. The automatic transmission uses three different modes: Sport, Snow, and Normal. A torsen style limited-slip differential is standard on most models.

The vehicles are offered with 16" steel and alloy wheels fitted with Yokohama dB Decibel E70 tyres in 205/55 size or 17" alloy wheels fitted with Michelin Primacy HP tyres in 215/45 size, depending on sales market. The limited editions Toyota Racing Development (TRD) GT86 models are instead offered with 18" forged aluminium wheels, which are fitted with either Yokohama Advan Sport tyres or Michelin Pilot Sport 3 tyres in 225/40 size, also depending on market. The braking systems vary between models and countries:

- Dual-piston front sliding calipers, single-piston rear sliding calipers, 294/290 mm ventilated disks (front/rear) – US market, EU markets, higher trim levels on most other markets
- Dual-piston front sliding calipers, single-piston rear sliding calipers, 277 mm ventilated disks front / 286 mm solid disks rear – lower trim levels on most other markets
- Four-piston front fixed calipers, two-piston rear fixed calipers, 326/316 mm ventilated disks (front/rear) – Performance Pack cars
- Six-piston front fixed calipers, four-piston rear fixed calipers, 355 mm two-piece / 345 mm ventilated disks (front/rear) – TRD Edition cars

Suspension design comprises front MacPherson struts and double wishbones at the rear.

In 2016, for the 2017 model year, the manual transmission 86 was upgraded to 153 kW (205 bhp; 208 PS) and 212 N⋅m (156 lb⋅ft). The final drive ratio was changed from 4.10 to 4.30.

Facelift (2017)
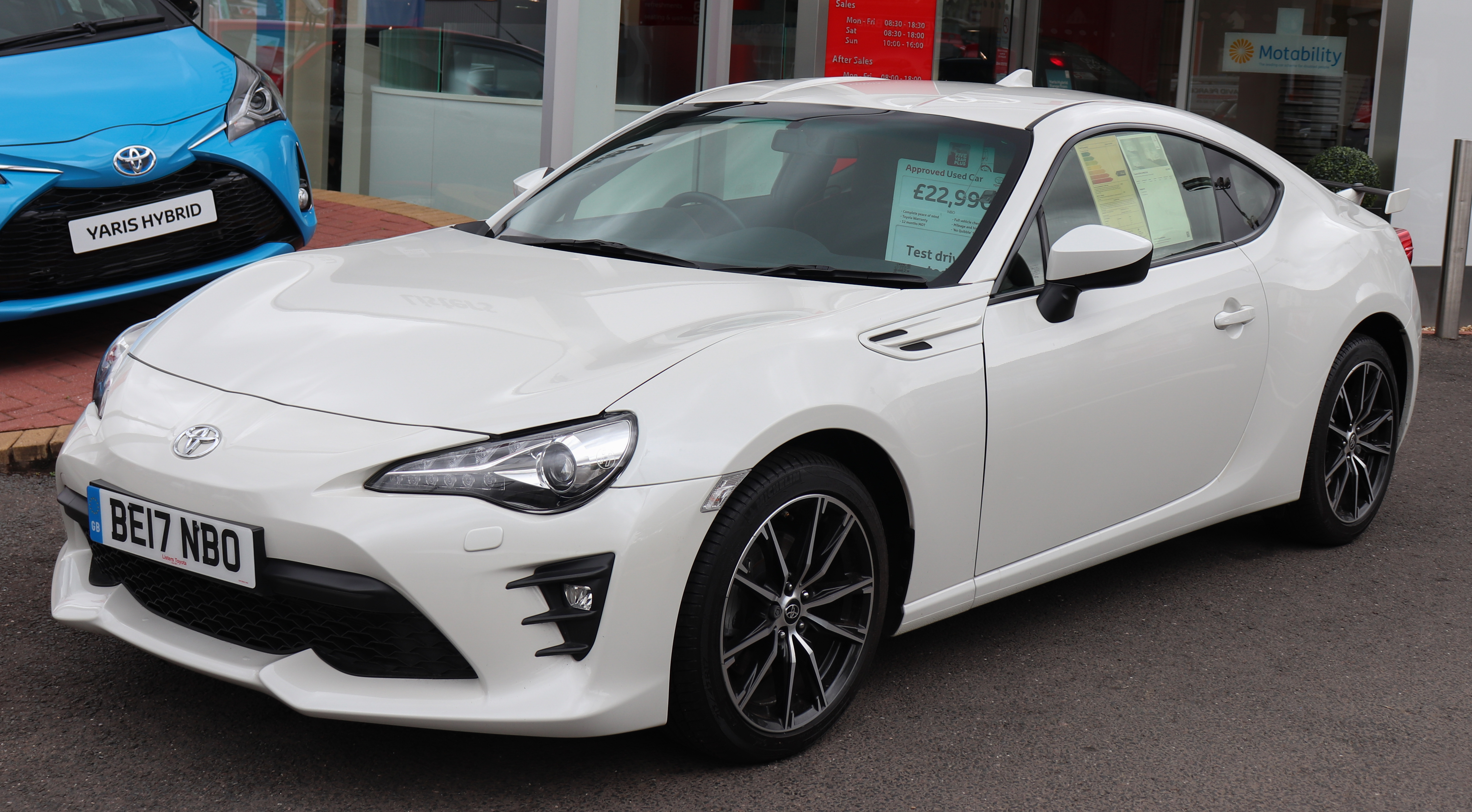

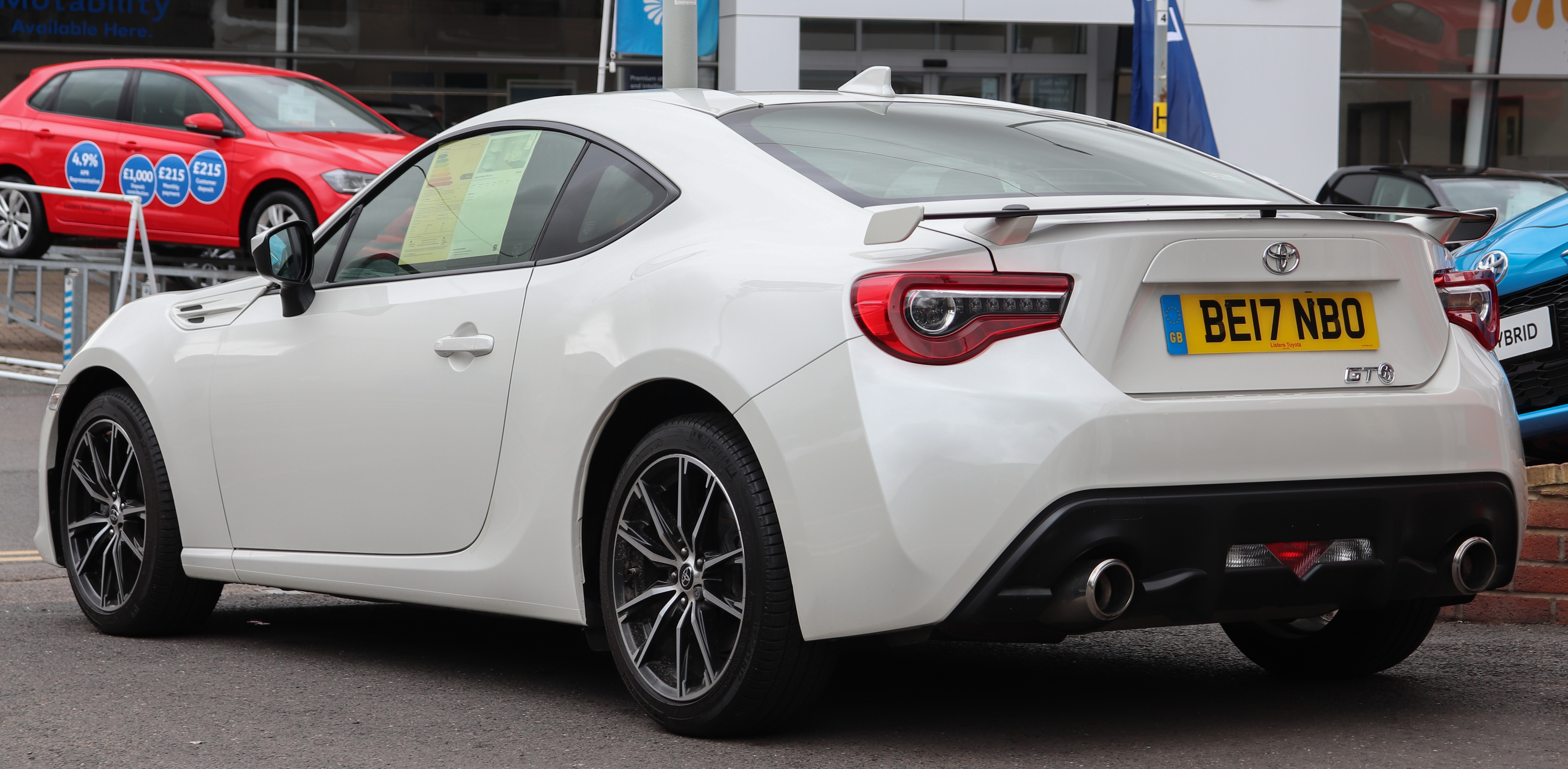
Toyota GT86 (United Kingdom; facelift)

==== Design ====
The 86's rear-wheel drive configuration and front-mounted flat boxer engine allow a low centre of gravity for strong handling characteristics. The bodywork has a drag coefficient of Cd=0.27.

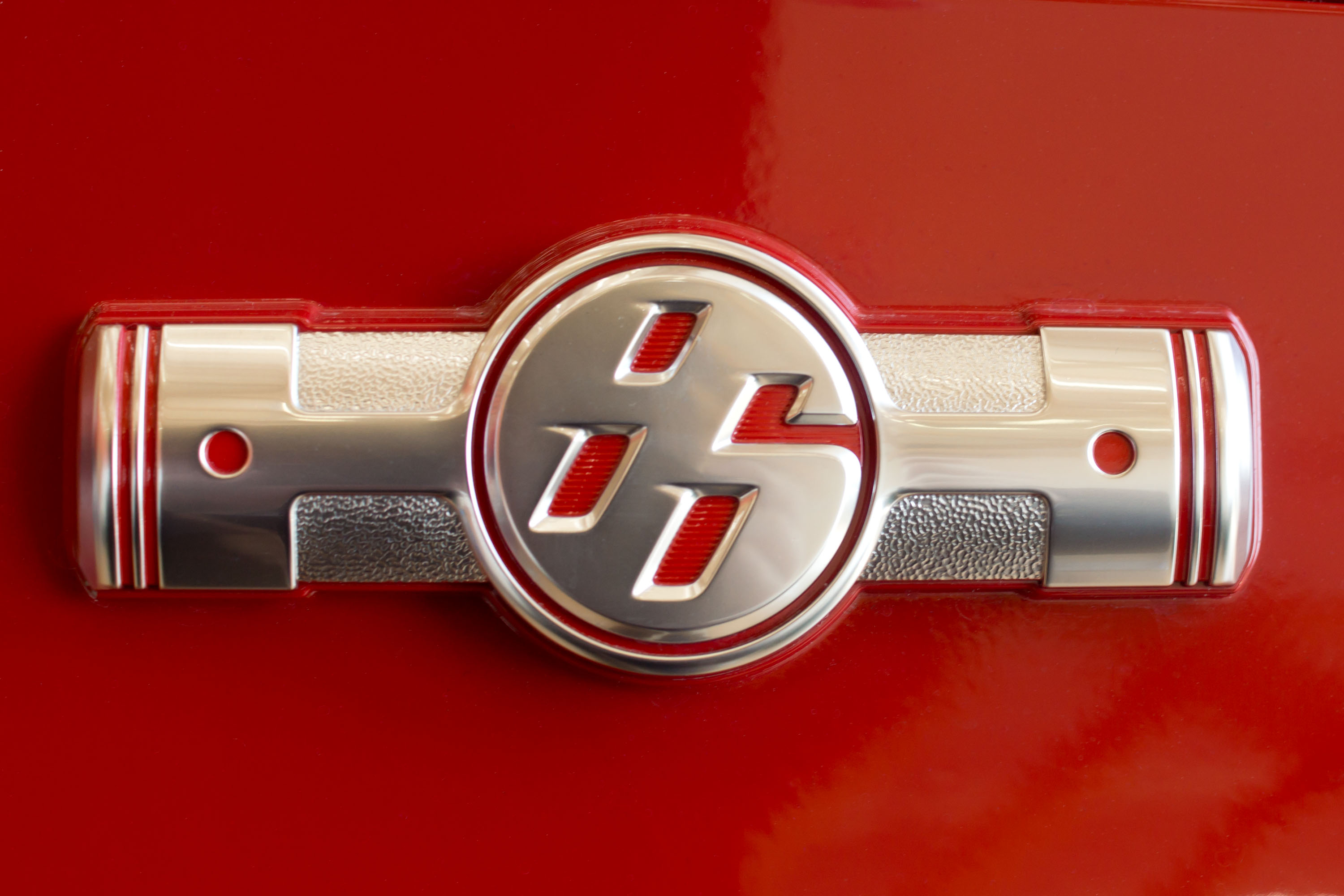
The "86" boxer side badge on Toyota and Scion models

According to the 86's designers, "The goal was to create an authentic rear-wheel drive sports car with compelling style, exceptionally balanced performance and handling, flexible utility and surprising MPG." When asked about the TRD version of the car, the lead engineer Mr. Tada said "There is definitely going to be a more TRD oriented variant down the line. However any of the parts that would be standard on the TRD model will fit on your current Toyota 86 so there is no need to wait."

The design of the GT86 was inspired by the Toyota 2000GT, as part of the concept of 'Neo Functionalism' (the idea that the cars driving quality and appearance were part of its functionality). 2000GT references were especially apparent in the side profile, windows and dashboard of the car.

The 86 "boxer" side badge appears on all Toyota and Scion versions of the car, but not the Subaru BRZ. Aside from badging, the main differences between the 86/GT86 and the BRZ are the front grilles and bumper bars.

The car included numerous references to the number 86:

- the engine bore and stroke is 86mm x 86mm
- the diameter of the exhaust tip is also 86mm.

==== Interior ====
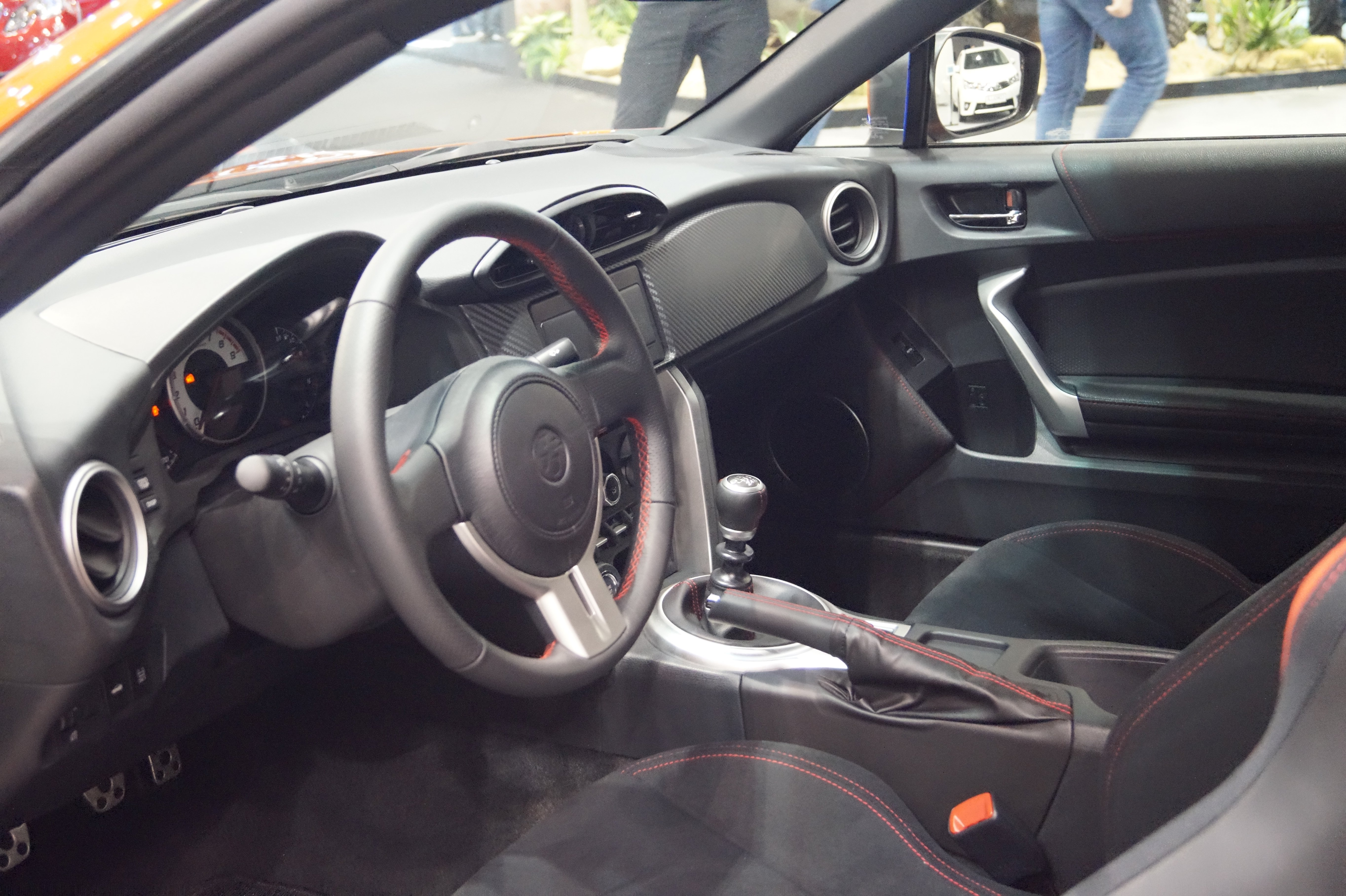
Toyota 86 interior with bucket seats

The interior uses low mounted front seats and fold down rear enabling increased storage space. The FR-S and base 86 models have cloth seats with all black interior trim with a black patterned dash trim, and shift boot red stitching. The BRZ has two available interiors, one identical to the FR-S but with silver dash trim, a red stitched parking brake boot, black gauge faces (instead of the white tachometer of the 86 GTS models) and a touch-screen navigation head unit; the second interior to leather and Alcantara heated seats, automatic HVAC controls, and a push-button start. The top-of-the-range 86 models are fitted like the BRZ except as noted above, and the Japanese interior can be had in black and red leather and Alcantara or full black leather and Alcantara.

==== Performance ====
- Top speed: 145 mph (233 km/h) (as tested)
- Acceleration:
  - 0–62 mph (0–100 km/h): 7.6 seconds (manufacturer's claim)
  - 0–60 mph (0–97 km/h): 6.0–6.2 seconds (estimated)
  - Standing 1/4 Mile: 14.7–14.9 seconds (estimated).

=== Toyota 86, GT86 and FT86 ===
The Toyota 86 is available in Japan from Toyota's Netz Store and Corolla Store line of dealerships; the 1983–1987 Sprinter Trueno and Corolla Levin were also sold at the same networks. Four trim levels are offered, with the RC model being the base aimed at people wishing to modify or race their vehicles. This model is available with only a six-speed manual transmission and comes with unpainted bumpers and mirrors, 16 inch steel wheels, simpler interior trim components, analogue speedometer and no stereo or air conditioning. Outside Japan, the RC model is only available in New Zealand. The G model adds all the interior components missing from the RC, plus a fully painted exterior and 16 inch alloy wheels and the availability of an automatic transmission. The GT86 model adds high intensity discharge headlights with LED daytime running lights, fog lamps, automatic climate control, keyless start with engine start button, 17 inch alloy wheels, chrome exhaust tips, white tachometer face with analogue and digital speedometer, silver accents on the centre dash and steering wheel, aluminium pedals. The top-of-the-range GT Limited adds leather and Alcantara seating and a rear spoiler.

In Europe, GT86 models are generally the same as the Japanese 86 GT with a red/black leather/Alcantara interior with red stitching. In the United Kingdom, the Japanese G model is sold as the GT86 Primo and the car has also been available as a limited edition Toyota Racing Development "TRD GT86", which features: 18 inch forged aluminium wheels with Yokohama Advan Sport tyres; full bodykit with front and side skirts, rear spoiler and new diffuser; quad-exhaust system; TRD-branded detailing on the filler cap, radiator cap and gear knob. In New Zealand, the TRD 86 is sold with the above features except for Michelin Pilot Sport 3 tyres instead plus upgraded TRD braking system. Options not available to all markets include a Bose sound system upgrade.

In Australia, the GT is the equivalent of the Japanese G model but with only an all black interior trim and standard radio head unit, whereas the top-of-the-range GTS model is the equivalent of the Japanese GT Limited except for an all black leather/Alcantara and red-stitch interior trim only and touchscreen multimedia head unit. Upon Australian launch in June 2012, all models for Australia featured a full-size spare wheel, the GTS lacked a rear spoiler, and a limited-slip differential or LSD was standard on all models except automatic GT's. The full-size spare wheel was phased out after the first shipments to Australia, replaced with a repair kit. This model also benefited from a remapping of its Electronic Control Unit (ECU) to address initial reports of rough idling and stalling. The range of models and main options had the following retail prices: GT manual A$29,990; GT automatic A$32,490; GTS manual A$35,490; GTS automatic A$37,990; metallic paint A$425 for all models; "Aero pack" bodykit A$3,000 for GTS only.

As of the August 2013 production update (which carried the formal year designation MY14), the automatic GT also gained LSD as standard (but with a price increase of A$300; manual price unchanged in Australia) and the GTS gained the same rear spoiler fitted to the Japanese GTS Limited and the Subaru BRZ (with a price increase of A$500 for both the manual and automatic model in Australia). Other distinguishing features on the MY14 models include the removal of the lettered "TOYOTA" badge from the rear bonnet of the GTS and optional availability of rear parking sonar sensors on GT and GTS.

In July 2014, an updated version of the Australian Toyota 86 range was launched with year designation MY15. The key highlights include: revised suspension settings; "shark-fin" roof antenna; GTS instrument cluster on GT; carbon-fibre look dash insert and reverse-view camera on GTS; new white and silver exterior paints. The price of the GT remained unchanged while the GTS was the subject of a price increase of A$500 and A$800 for the manual and automatic version, respectively.

In late 2014, as part of its MY15 range, Toyota offered in the UK two new models: the GT86 Aero, featuring a full bodykit and 18 inch OZ Ultraleggera alloy wheels in anthracite grey finish; and the GT86 "Giallo" (meaning yellow in Italian), limited to only 86 units. Similar to the latter, Toyota also offered in Italy a total of 50 "Limited Edition" models. Externally, the key distinguishing feature of these limited editions is the new Sunrise Yellow metallic paint and black side stripes (bonnet, roof and bonnet stripes are available in the UK at no extra cost and standard in Italy). The interior is distinguished by a limited edition badge and heated quilt leather seats with yellow 86 logo. The retail price of the Limited Edition in Italy is €28,500, which translates to €1,700 more than the standard base model.

At the same time in Japan, Toyota released the 14R-60 model limited to 100 units, inspired by the GT86 TRD Griffon Project of 2013. Its engine power remains the same as the standard models despite featuring various drivetrain changes such as twin central exhausts, a TRD mechanical LSD, a short-shifter, and revised gearing for the six-speed manual transmission. Other changes include extra body reinforcement, a variable-height coil-over spring suspension setup and more rigid suspension bushings. A TRD bodykit with carbon fibre components is complemented by 18 inch magnesium wheels and, overall, 14R-60 model results lighter than the base model. Inside there are race-style bucket seats with four-point belts, an Alcantara-clad steering wheel, carbon fibre dashboard trim and yellow piping and highlights. Price-wise, this Japan-only model is listed for ¥6,300,000, which is significantly higher than the ¥2,100,000 for the base RC model or ¥3,100,000 for the top-of-the-range GT Limited.

In 2015, the 86xstyle Cb was officially launched after its presentations at the 2013 and 2014 Tokyo Auto Salon. It is characterised by a drastically different front end design with revised lights and bumper bar but standard bonnet. Available in six-speed manual or automatic transmission, it has revised interior trimmings including a red Cb logo embroidered leather steering wheel, white (instead of red) backlit instruments and a dark woodgrain-style panel across the dashboard. The most peculiar features are the replacement of the front side gills with a set of LED-illuminated fins and optional contrasting colour for the car's upper body section. Another option is different alloy wheels than those fitted as standard on the GT86. On sale from April, this Japan-only model is listed for ¥4,180,000, which is a ¥1,280,000 premium over the regular 86 GT on which this variant is based.

To celebrate Australia's 86 2016 Pro-Am racing series, the following November Toyota launched 450 "Blackline" units (250 of which with manual transmission). Based on the standard GTS model, this limited edition carries a A$2,000 premium because of its cosmetic upgrade with TRD parts and special livery.

In Indonesia, the 86 was launched in 2012. The facelifted version was launched in August 2016. Toyota Indonesia sells the 86 in the TRD package with only an automatic transmission and the non-TRD package with both manual and automatic transmission.

In 2018, Toyota sold a special edition 86 called Apollo Blue to celebrate that the 86 had passed 20,000 units sold in Australia. It features a unique Apollo Blue body colour, black rear spoiler and mirror caps, and is only available with the optional Dynamic Performance Package.

Peculiarly, in Jamaica and Nicaragua, the 86 is marketed and sold using one of its pre-launch concept car badges, the "FT-86".

Although BRZ production ended in July 2020, 86 production was to continue at least until the third quarter of 2020.

=== Subaru BRZ ===
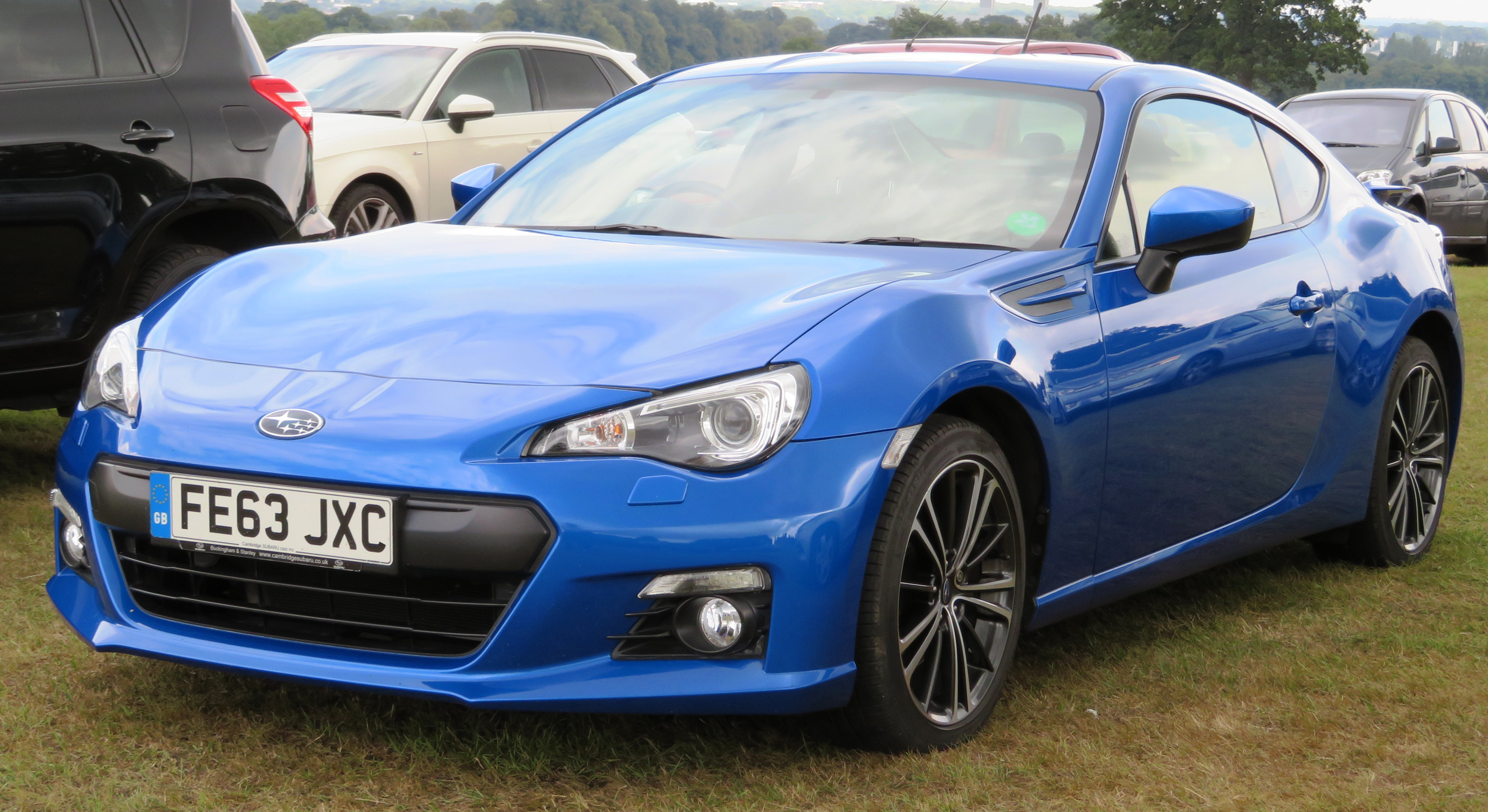

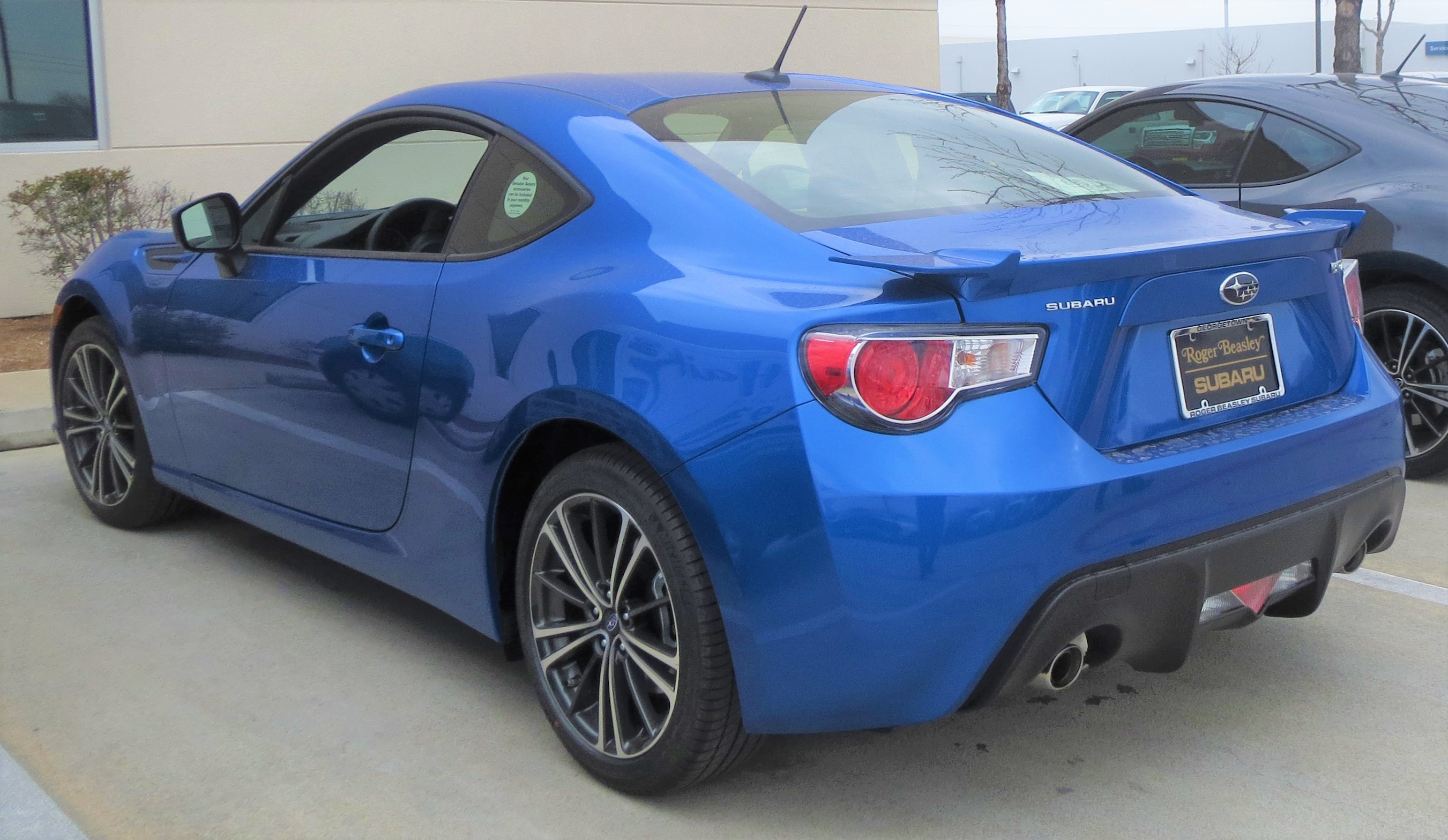
Subaru BRZ (pre-facelift)

The BRZ's name comes from three elements: Boxer engine, rear-wheel drive, and Z standing for Zenith. The Subaru BRZ differs from the 86's design in the front fascia, with a different grille and headlight assembly, as well as a different front wing vent. The BRZ's grille is hexagonal in shape and inverted, compared to the Toyota's trapezoid. The BRZ features a wraparound of LED parking lights in the headlight assembly, while daytime running lights are integrated into the bumper. The suspension setup of the Subaru is different from the Toyota. Like the Japanese Toyota 86, Subaru offers an RA base model lacking most interior comforts and using 16 inch steel wheels, with the only difference from the 86 RC being that the BRZ RA's bumpers are painted the same colour as the body. Two main trim levels are offered: R trim, known as Premium in North America, and S trim, known as Limited in North America. The most notable differences between the trims being the S trim (Limited) received leather seats with Alcantara inserts that were heated rather than the cloth seats in the R trim (Premium). In Europe and Australia BRZs offer a Toyota stereo unit, while Japanese and North American vehicles use a Subaru unit. Australian BRZs were originally available for sale only online.

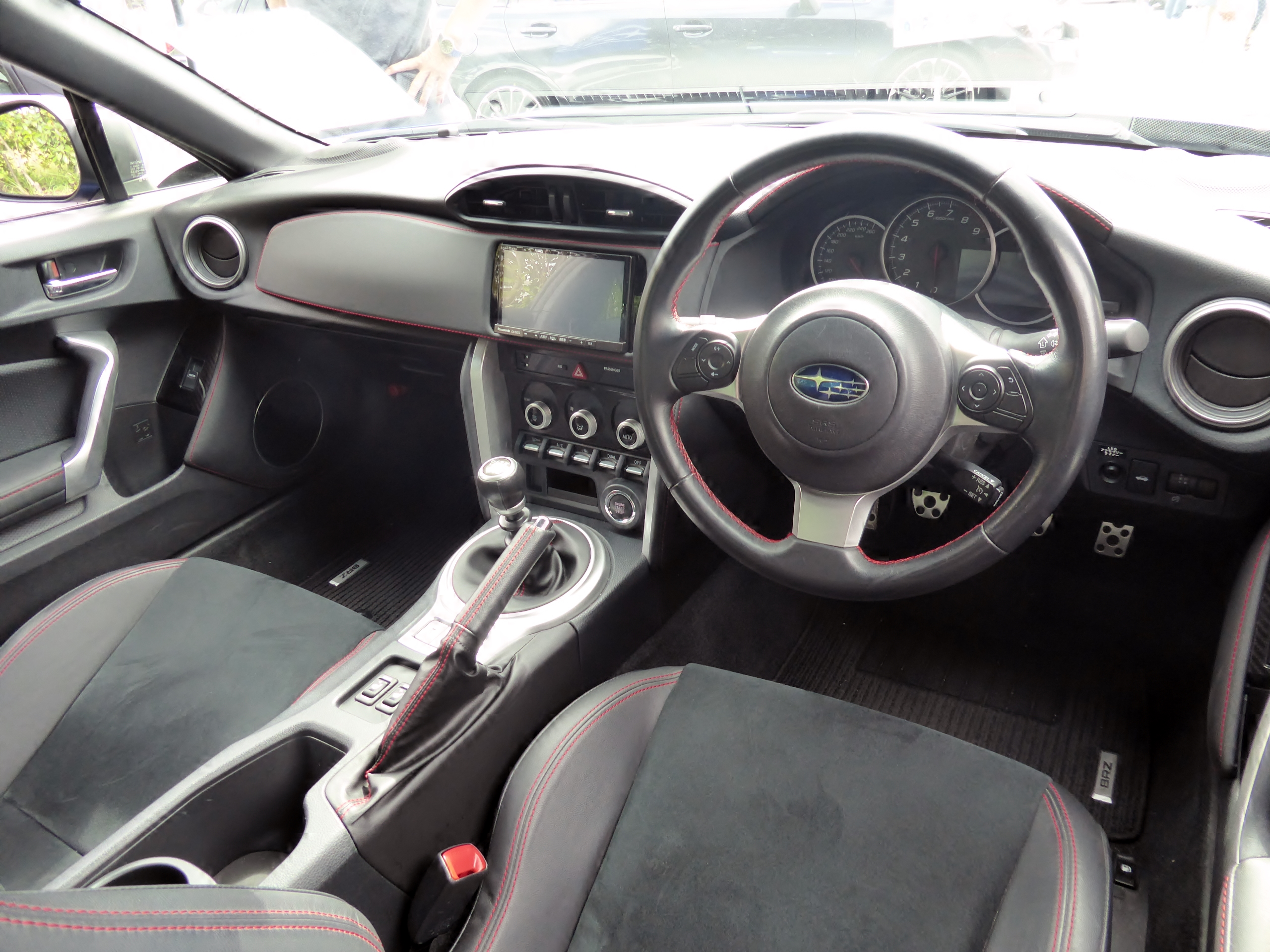
Interior

In 2013, Subaru unveiled a BRZ tS model for the Japanese market, tuned by STI. The tS model features an improved suspension setup, 18 inch silver BBS wheels, STI bodykit and front spoiler, a larger drive shaft, and Brembo brakes, along with interior changes including a new steering wheel, front seat, gauges, and Alcantara accents. A further tS GT Package includes Recaro seats, black BBS wheels, and an adjustable carbon fibre rear wing. The tS is limited to 500 units in total, with a maximum of 250 of them being the GT package. In 2015, a similar release of 300 units was sold again only in Japan.

In 2014, as part of running changes consistent with those of the MY15 Toyota 86 GTS, the Subaru BRZ also featured a new key fob and two new colours, including 'WR Blue Pearl' metallic finish. In addition, Subaru also launched special editions both for the United States and Australia markets. For the former, one thousand BRZ Series. Blue editions were marketed at additional cost, half painted in Blue Pearl and the other half in Crystal Pearl White. This model featured STI body kit parts, 17-inch STI black alloy wheels and red brake calipers. For Australia, Subaru launched a similar variant known as the Special Edition, also at additional cost. It featured stripes across the bonnet, boot and roof; 17-inch STI black alloy wheels; STI boot spoiler plus front, side and rear-side under spoilers; a rear diffuser and a push-button starter switch. It was available in every existing BRZ paint hue.

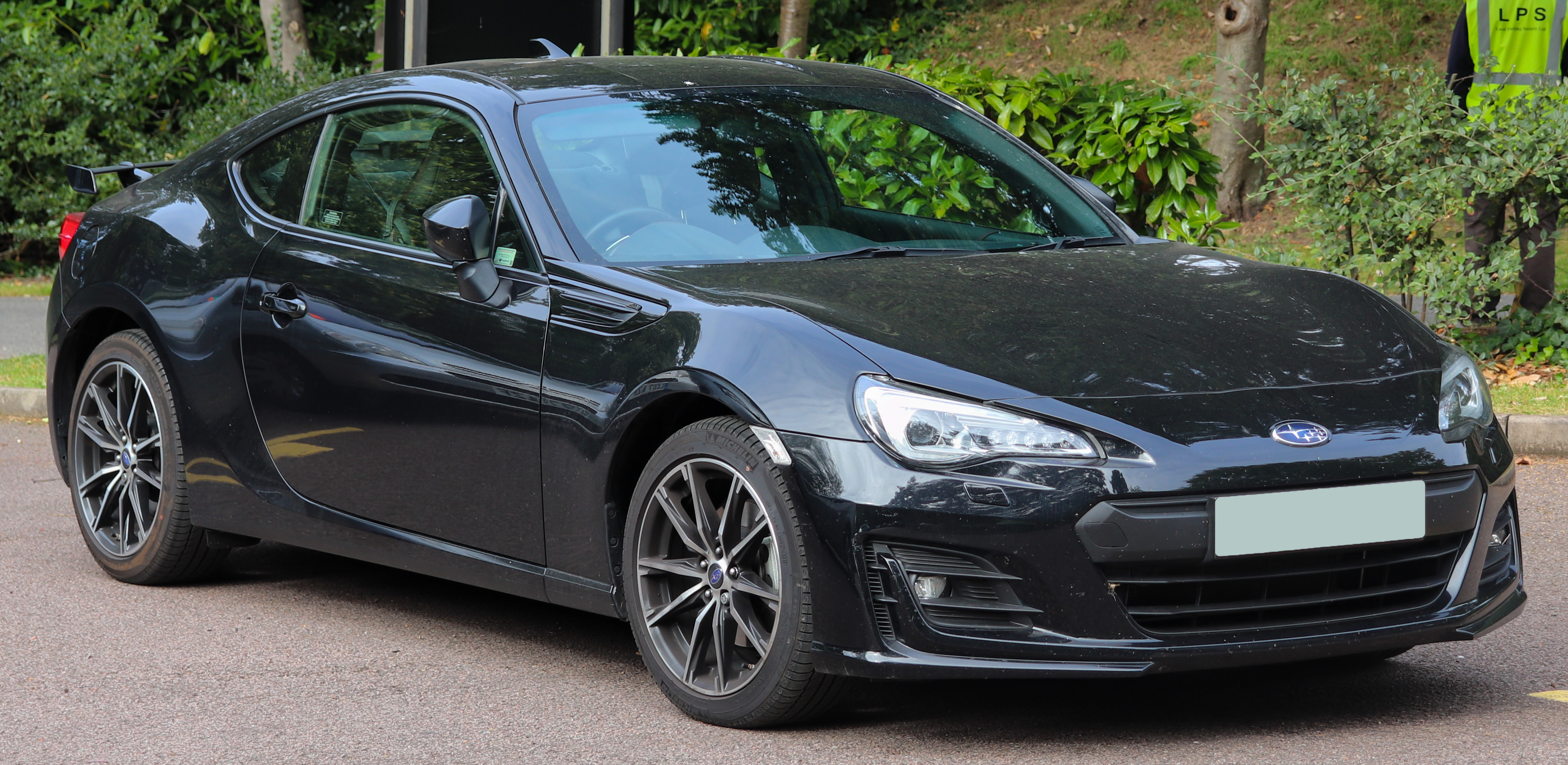
Subaru BRZ (facelift)

In 2015, for the 2016 model year, Subaru released the limited edition Hyper Blue range across its WRX, WRX STI and BRZ models. In Australia, the BRZ was limited to 50 units with manual transmission only. This limited edition is characterised by the said blue paint and a host of other cosmetic upgrades.

For the 2017 model year Subaru released another new special edition for the newly redesigned BRZ. This edition is called the Series Yellow in America which was limited to 500 units but known as the Inazuma Edition in Canada which was limited to between 200 and 250 cars. This special edition is based on the Limited trim level for the BRZ and features the optional Performance package as standard, which includes 4 piston Brembo brakes in the front, 2 piston Brembo brakes in the rear, and Sachs dampers, a special yellow body colour called Charlesite Yellow with black trim, a yellow embroidered BRZ logo on the seats, and yellow accents and stitching throughout the interior.

In February 2018, Subaru of America released a limited edition SOA 50th Anniversary edition BRZ based on the Limited trim level featuring Heritage Blue exterior colour, satin chrome exterior trim and badging; and SOA 50th anniversary emblem. The interior features black upholstery with contrasting silver stitching; silver seatbelts; and the 50th Anniversary logo embroidered on the front seats and carpeted floor mats. Only 250 were made.

In late July 2020, Subaru ended production of the first-generation BRZ, and no more orders were accepted.

=== Scion FR-S ===
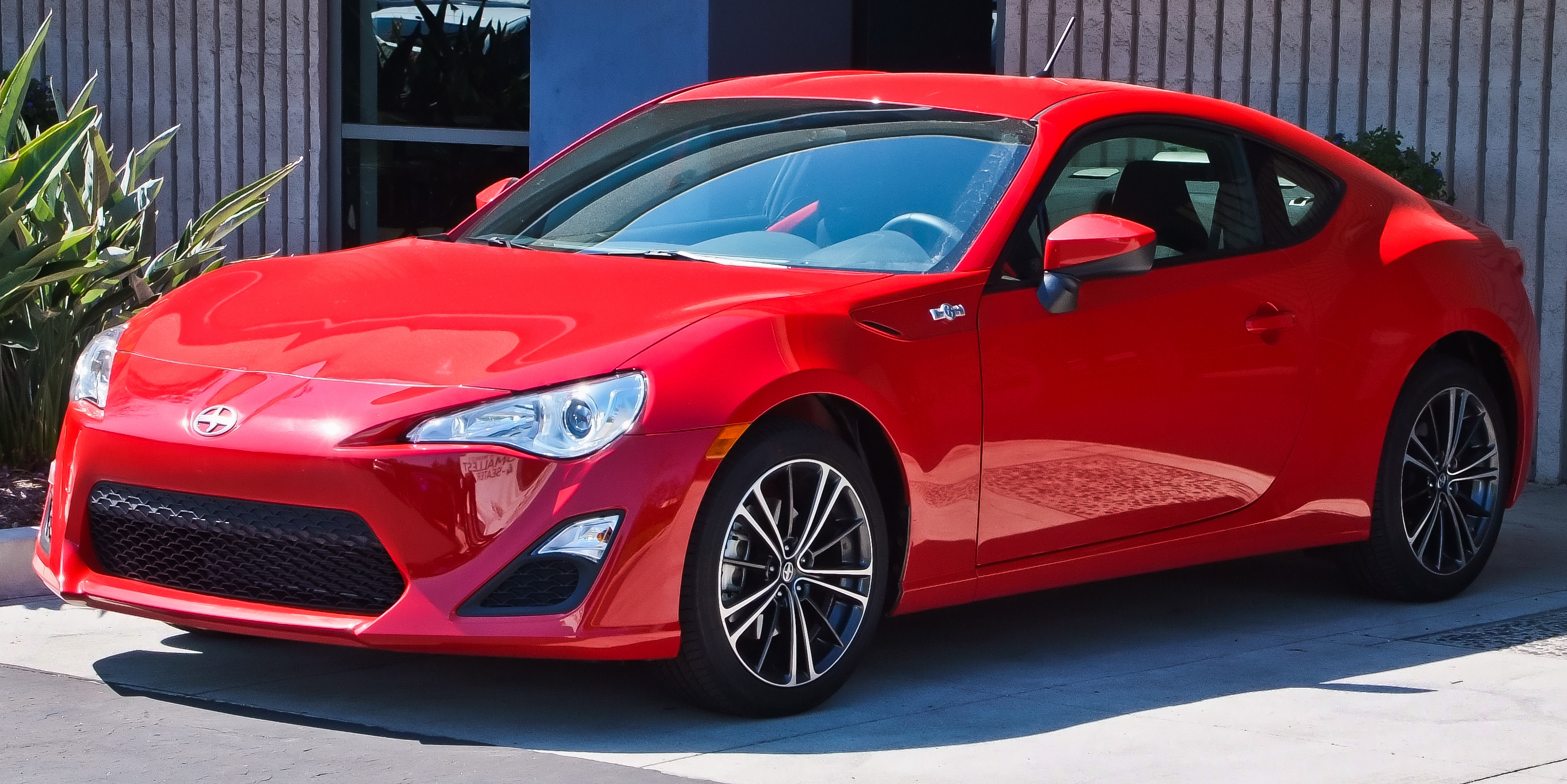

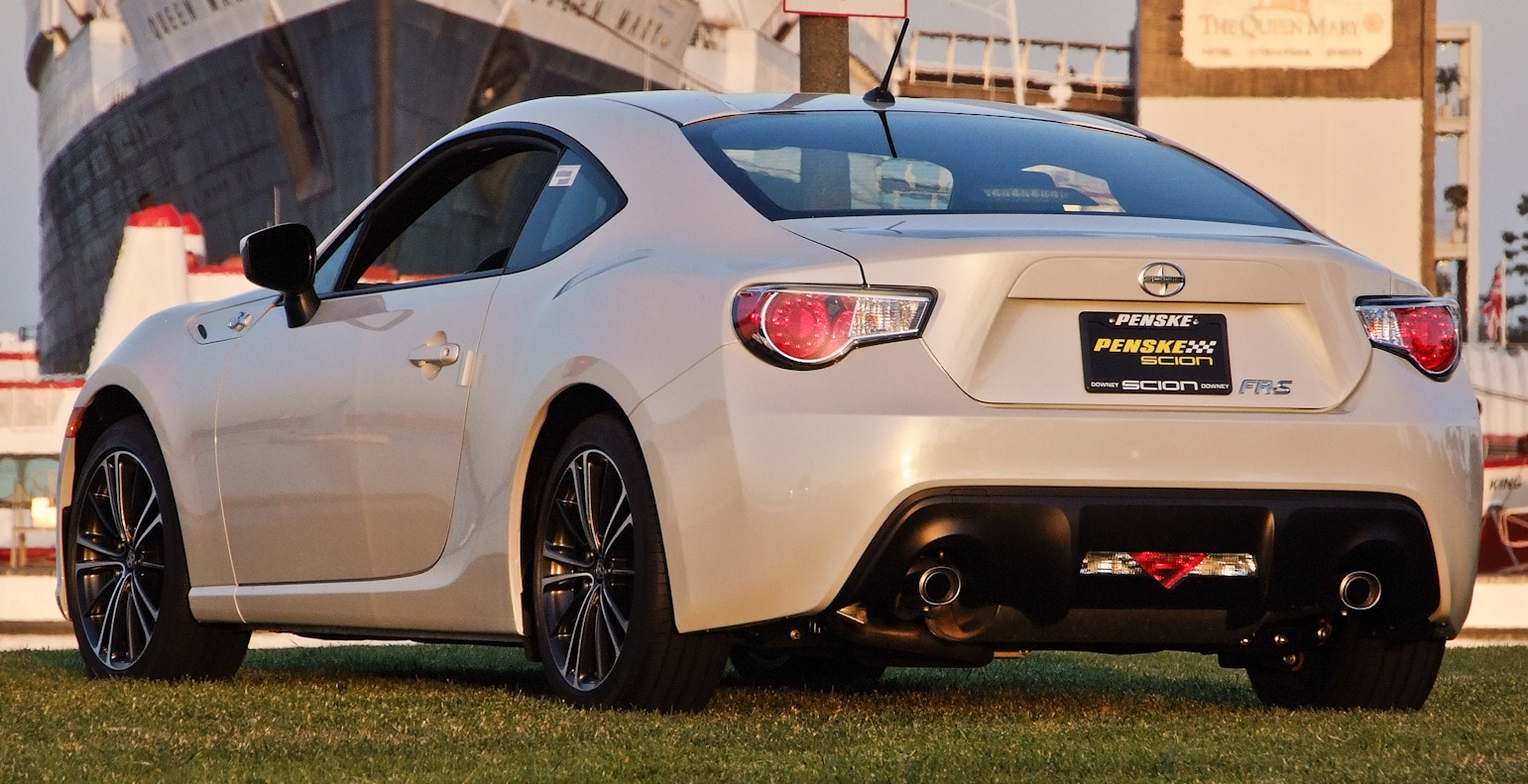
Scion FR-S (North America)

In the United States and Canada, the GT86 was initially sold under Toyota's youth-oriented Scion brand, with its name, FR-S, derived from a description of the platform: front-engine, rear-wheel drive, sport. Scion used a simplified "pure price" sales model that eschewed traditional factory options in favour of fixed base-vehicle pricing and buyer customisation via dealer-installed accessories; hence, the FR-S was offered in a single standard trim, with exterior colours and the choice of transmission typically being the only factory options. However, Scion offered some limited-production special editions with added factory equipment and exclusive colours.

==== 10 Series ====
As part of the 10th anniversary of the Scion marque, 2,500 units of "10 Series" FR-S models were released by Scion in June 2013 for the 2013 model year. They were painted in Silver Ignition and fitted with extra equipment, including HID headlights, automatic climate control, push button start, illuminated exterior badges plus shifter knob.

==== Release Series 1.0 ====
Presented at the April 2014 New York Auto Show and mirroring the European Giallo and Limited Edition yellow-painted special editions, Scion released 1500 units of the "Release Series 1.0" in similar Yuzu Yellow paint. It features TRD bodykit and quad-tip exhaust system, along with TRD lowered suspension, TRD steering wheel and shift knob and the highest specification (dual A/C, HID headlamps with LED daytime running lamps, push-button start-stop) plus a numbered commemorative plaque near the gearshift lever.

==== Release Series 2.0 ====
In October 2015, Scion revealed a limited run of 1000 cars called the FR-S Release Series 2.0.

Due to the discontinuation of the Scion marque, in August 2016 the FR-S was re-branded as the Toyota 86 in North America for the 2017 model year and onward.

=== Post-launch concept cars ===
==== Scion FR-S Tuner Challenge (2012) ====
There are 3 versions of 2013 Scion FR-S built with a $15,000 build budget, created as part of the eighth annual Scion Tuner Challenge. The FR-S Tuner Challenge vehicles are the: Carbon Stealth FR-S by John Toca of Chicago, Illinois; FR-S GT by Daniel Song of Orange County, California; Minty FReSh by Chris Basselgia of Lebanon, Pennsylvania.

The vehicles were unveiled at the 2012 SEMA show.

The 2012 challenge was won by the Minty FReSh.

==== Subaru BRZ Premium Sport Package Concept (2013) ====
At the January 2013 Tokyo Auto Salon, Subaru unveiled a BRZ Premium Sport Package concept featuring various STI parts as well as 19 inch BBS wheels and a carbon fibre roof.

==== Toyota 86 concepts – Tokyo Auto Salon (2013) ====
===== Toyota 86×Style Cb =====
The 86xStyle Cb (model ZN6-A2E7) is a re-presentation of the concept seen at the 2013 Tokyo Auto Salon. Its listed features are a six-speed automatic transmission, style Cb TB sport seats, leather-wrapped steering wheel, original meter and lighting, style Cb original floor mats, Toyota NHZD-W62G navigation system, dark smoke plated inner panel register RL, centre cluster garnish, door panel; metallic steering wheel door switch base, shift bezel; Zack suspension absorber, BBS style Cb original colour wheels (18x7J front, 18x7.5J rear) and Bridgestone POTENZA S001 86 exclusive spec tyres (215/40R18 85W front, 225/40R18 88W rear).

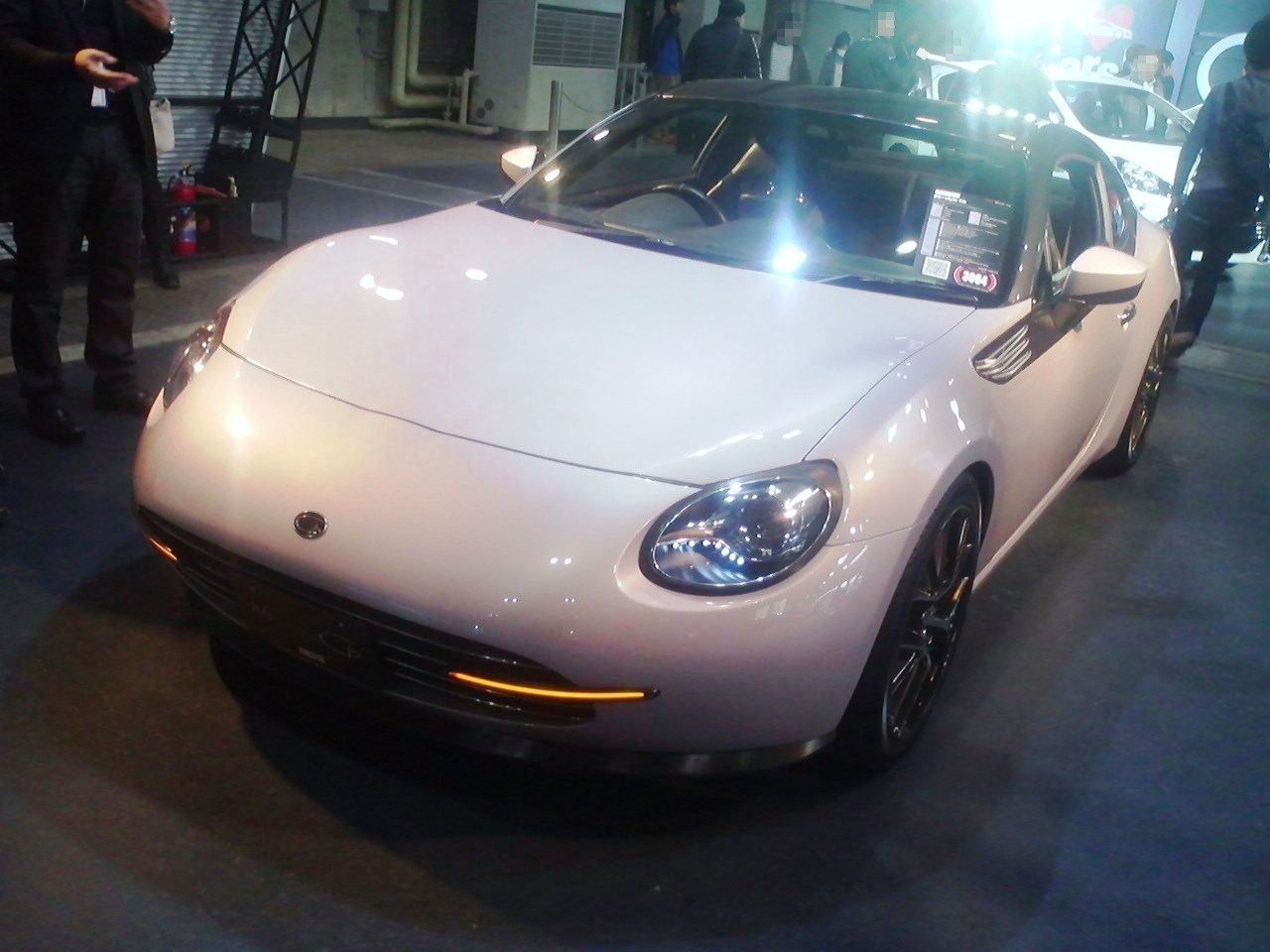
Front

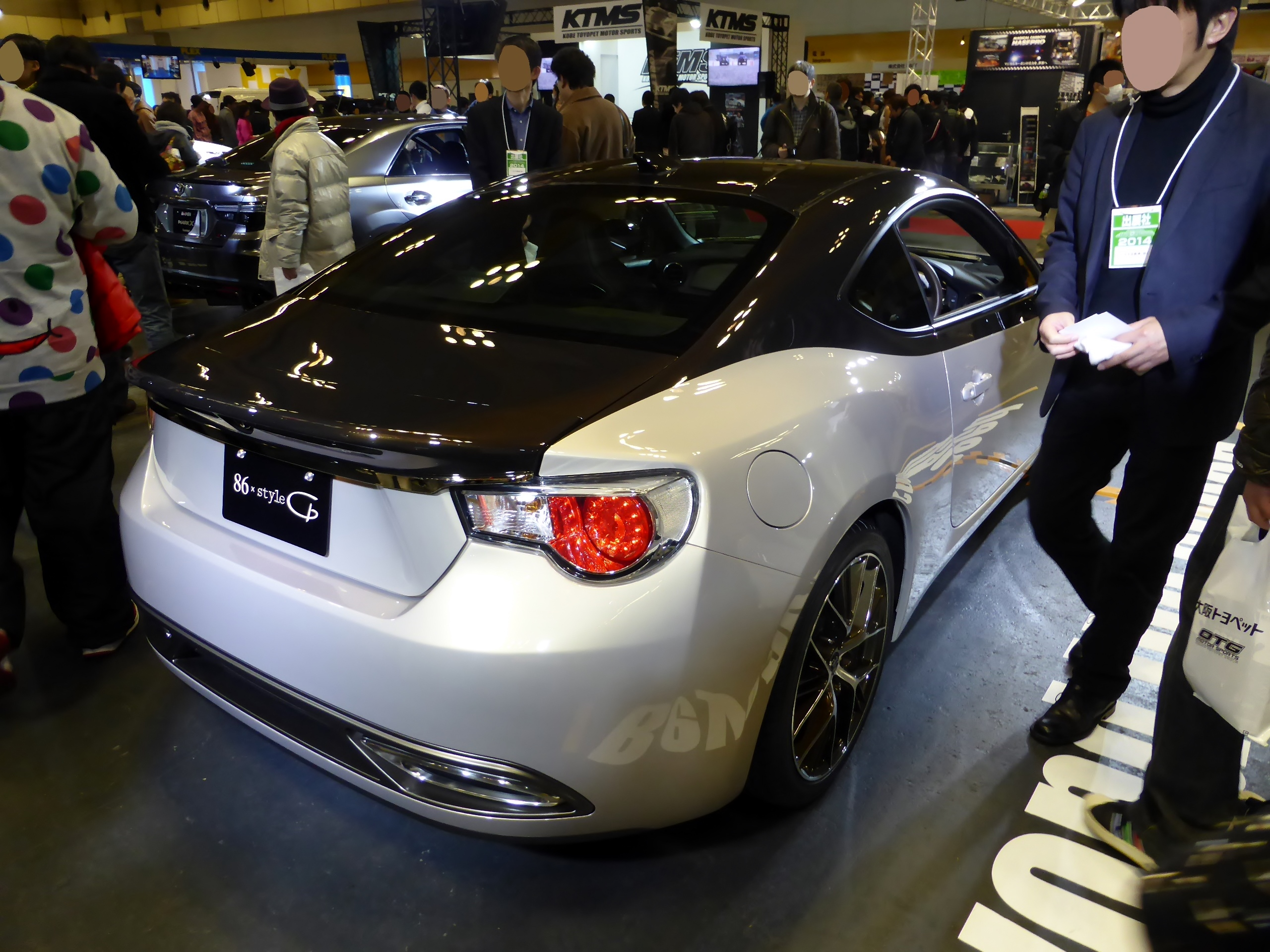
Rear

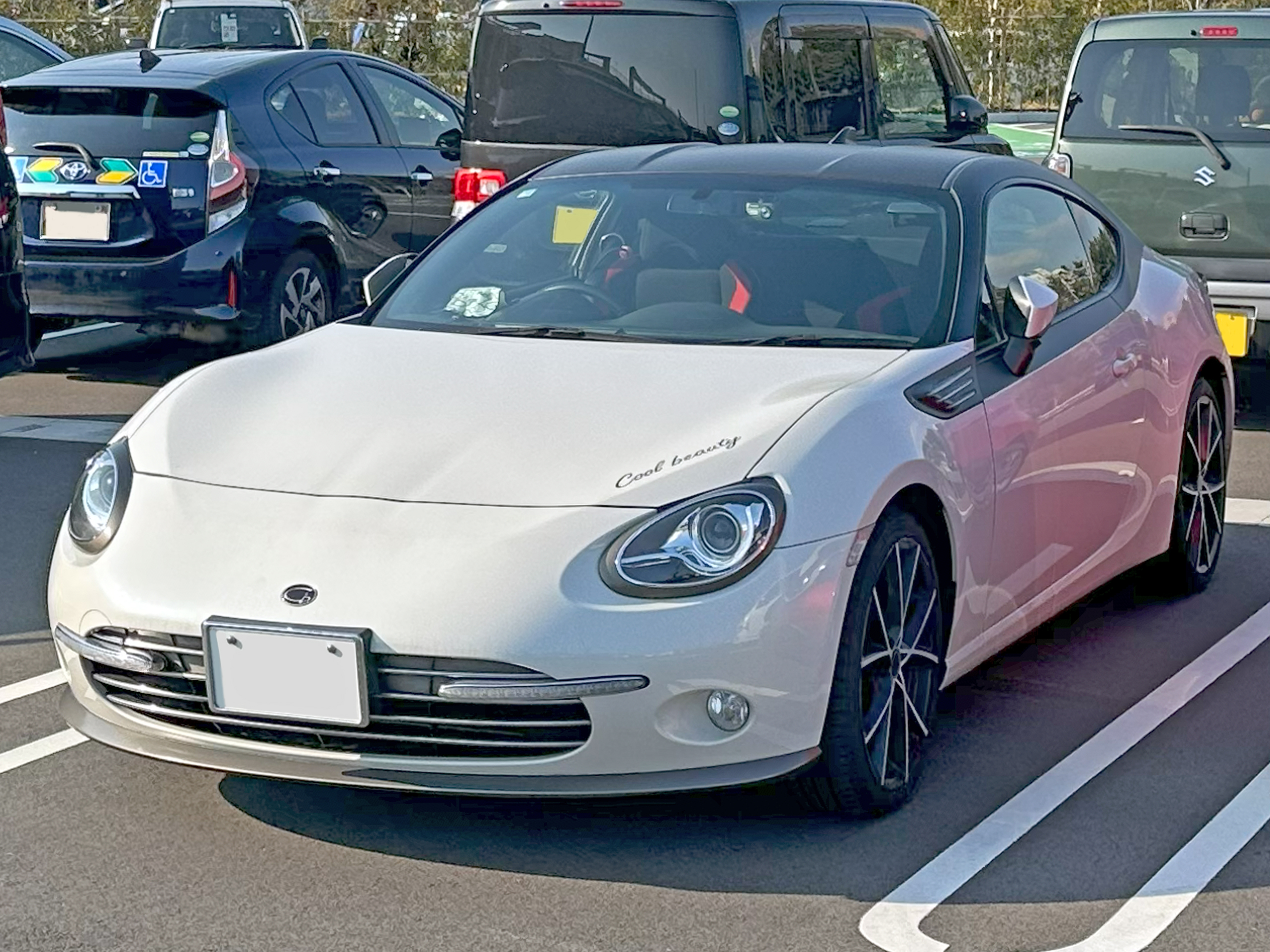
2015 Toyota 86 style Cb (front)

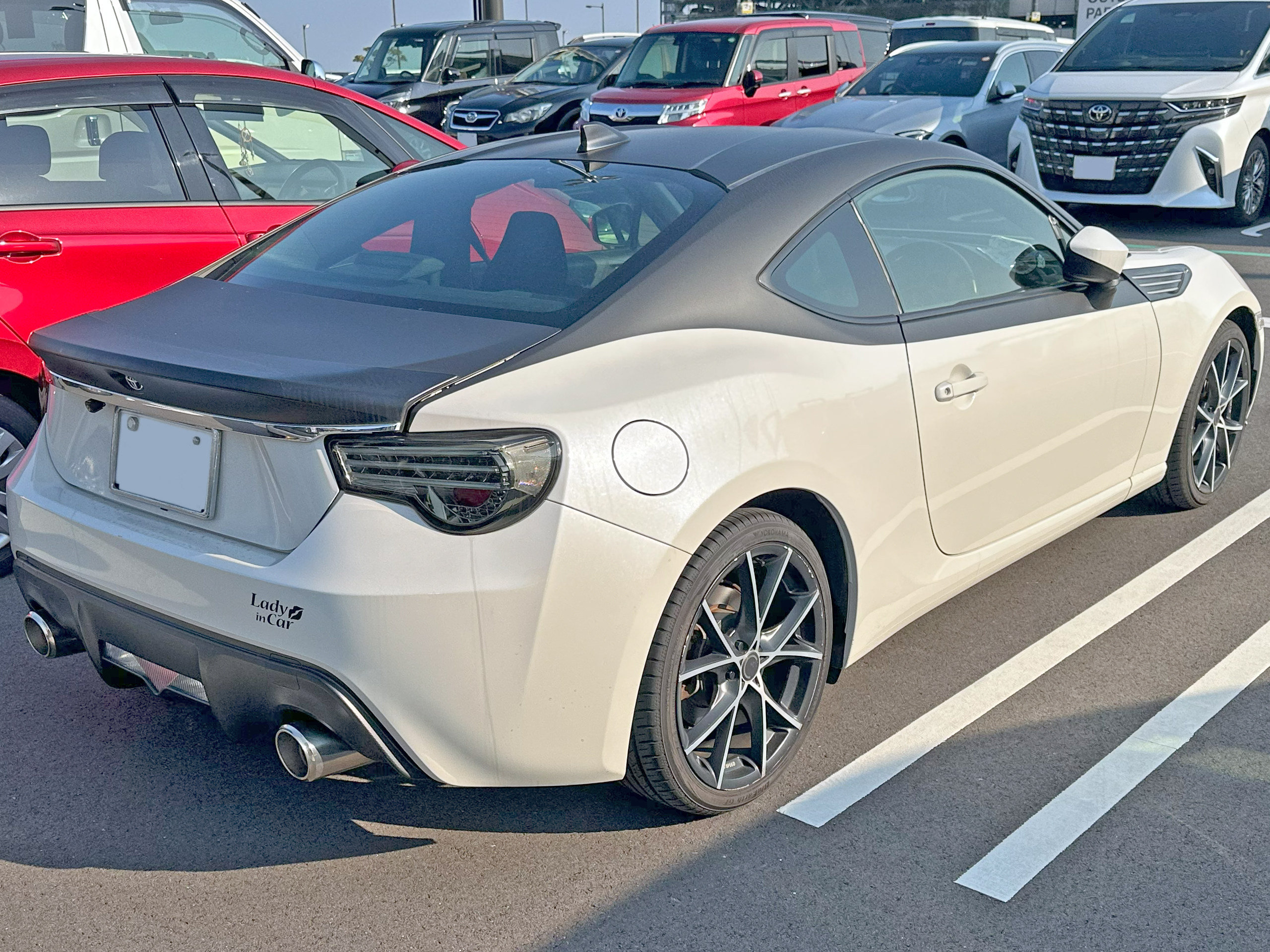
2015 Toyota 86 style Cb (rear, with aftermarket rear lamps)

===== Toyota GT86 Modellista =====
The Toyota GT86 Modellista is a version of the Toyota 86 with new side skirts, rear bumper and diffuser, a special lip spoiler, 18 inch matte chrome "Wing Dancer II" wheels with 225/40 Toyo tyres and a two-tone black and red interior with the instrument cluster and interior panels in a red metal finish.

===== TOM'S N086V =====
The TOM'S N086V is a version of the Toyota 86 with a GR 3.5 litre V6 engine originally found under the bonnet of the Lexus IS and GS rated at 298 kW (400 hp).

==== Toyota TRD Griffon Concept (2013) ====
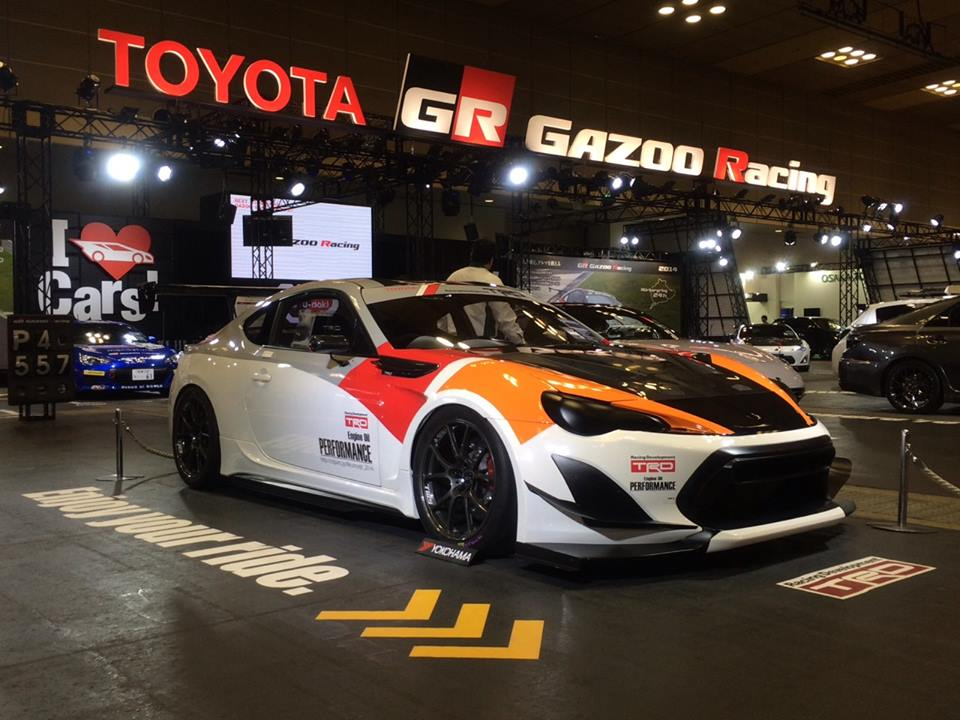
Toyota TRD Griffon Concept

The TRD Griffon Concept is a version of the GT86 designed specifically for track driving, created by Toyota Racing Development. Changes include bonnet, roof, doors, boot lid and rear wings made from lightweight carbon fibre; carbon fibre reinforced plastic bumpers, wider front wings and rear diffuser; windows made from polycarbonate material, TRD driver's bucket seat, gear shift knob, ignition button and oil pressure and water temperature gauges; MOMO steering wheel, Takata seatbelts, a TRD mechanical LSD replacing the standard Torsen limited-slip differential, coil over suspension kit, final gear ratio shortened to 4.8:1, an oil cooler for the engine, a TRD monoblock brake calliper kit with racing spec brake pads and TWS 18-inch wheels with Yokohama Advan tyres. The engine is a stock Toyota GT86 engine. The vehicle is 227 kg (500 lb) lighter than the stock Toyota GT86.

The TRD Griffon Concept was unveiled at the 2013 Tokyo Auto Salon followed by the 2013 Goodwood Festival of Speed.

==== Toyota FT-86 Open Concept (2013) ====
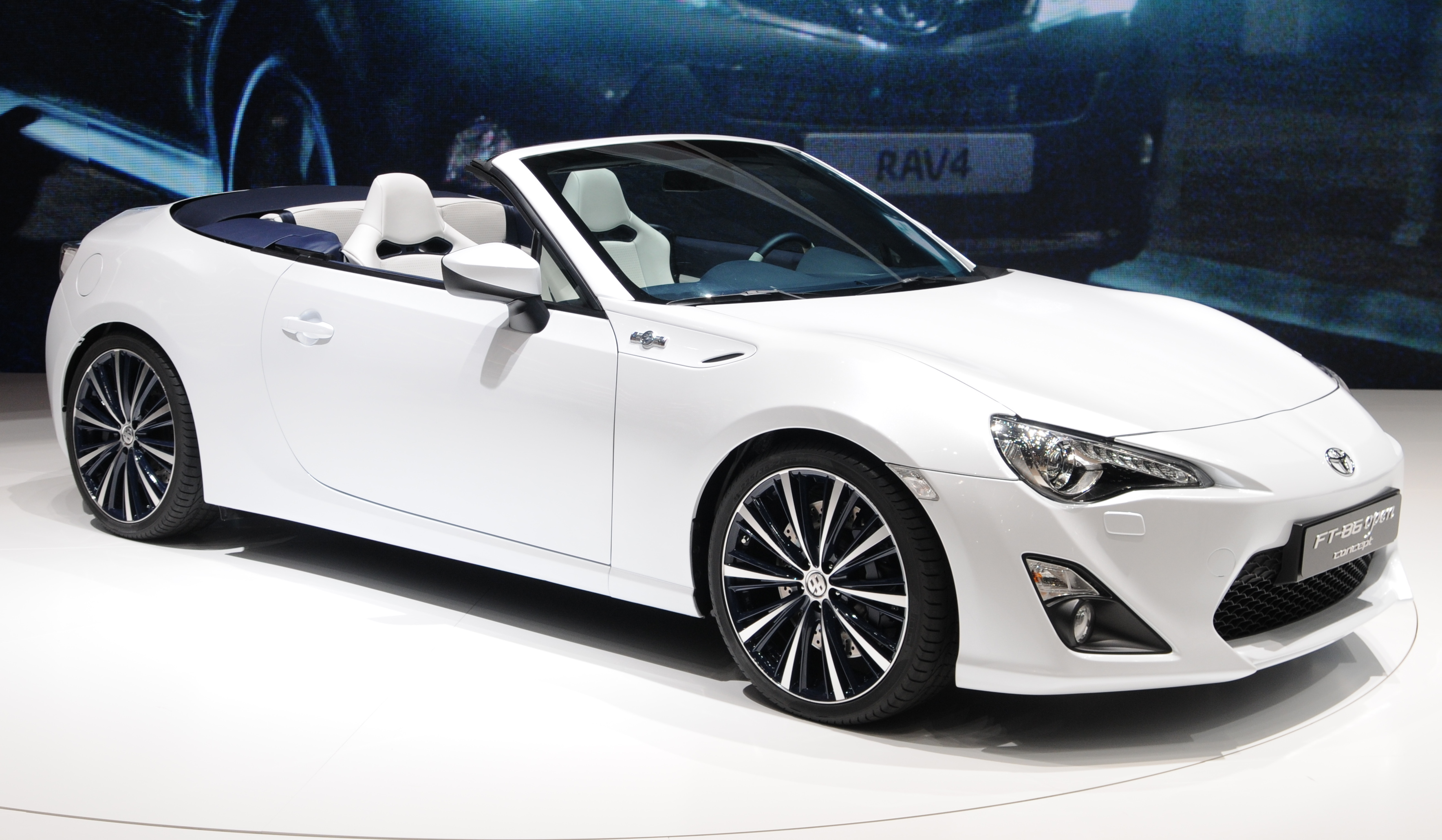
The Toyota FT-86 Open Concept, a convertible version of the 86

The FT-86 Open concept is a convertible concept vehicle based on the Toyota 86. It includes an electrically operated multi-layered fabric roof with glass, high-contrast white and navy blue interior and exterior designed by Toyota Boshoku Milan Design (TBMD) to capture the spirit and atmosphere of Milan, a white body colour and yellow-gold stitching in the floor mats and seats. It was first shown at the Geneva Motor Show in March 2013, followed by the 2013 Tokyo Motor Show (with Flash Red body colour and electrically operated soft top).

Nonetheless, Subaru brand chief Yasuyuki Yoshinaga has said that a convertible 86 would need a complete redesign to meet safety standards and that it is unlikely to happen.

==== Subaru Cross Sport Design Concept (2013) ====
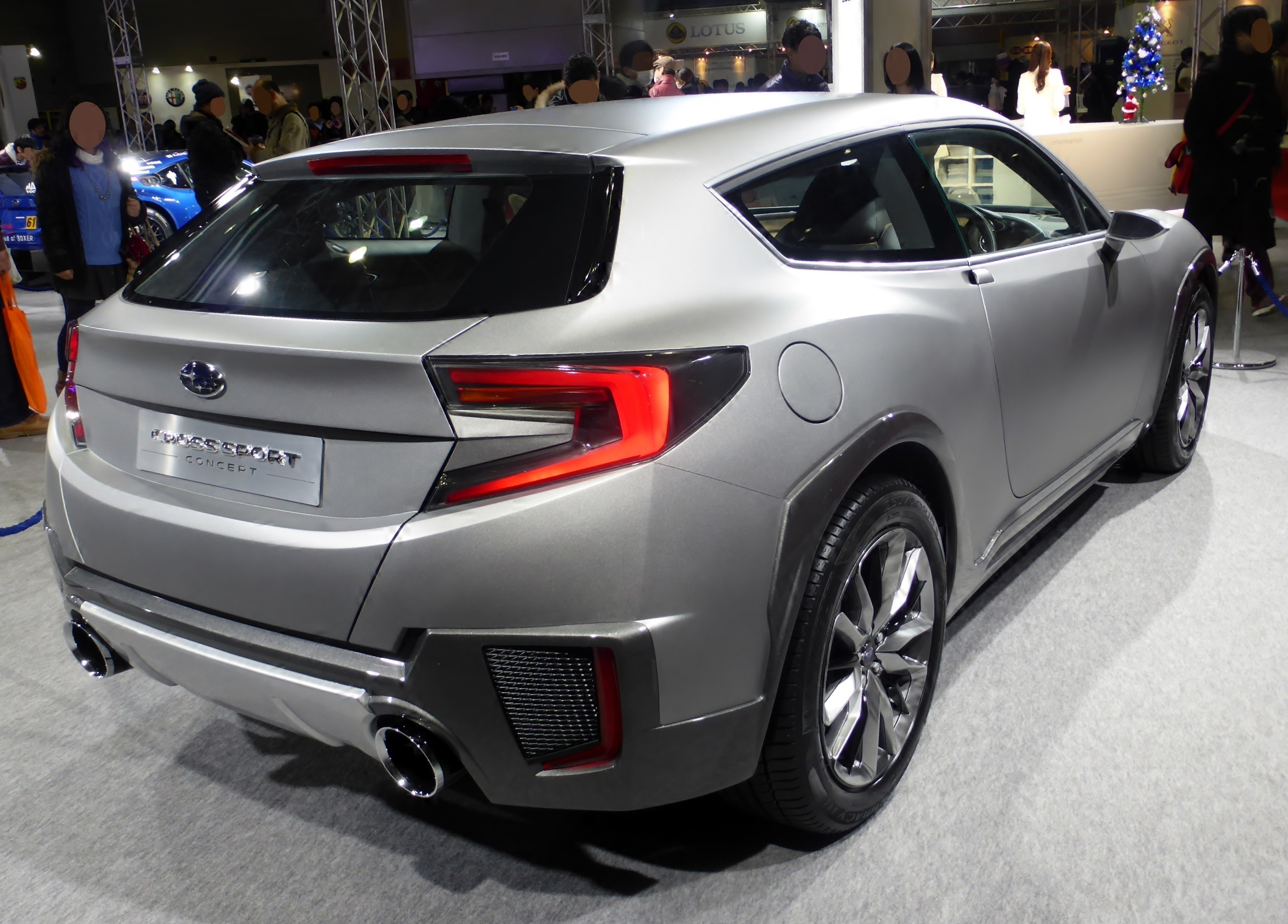
Cross Sport concept rear 3/4-view

Also seen at the Tokyo Motor Show, this vehicle was presented as a combination of 'sport' and 'utility', adopting a heavily BRZ-inspired shooting-brake body shape. Its compact body measured an overall length of 4,300 mm (169.3 in) and was described as what Subaru perceives to be the next trend in urban SUVs. The total height of the Cross Sport concept is 90 mm (3.5 in) taller than the standard BRZ.

==== Toyota Gazoo 86 GRMN Sports FR Concept Platinum (2013) ====
The Toyota Gazoo 86 GRMN Sports FR Concept Platinum is a Toyota 86/Scion FR-S modified by Toyota Gazoo Racing and equipped with a GRMN exclusive turbocharger and scroll supercharger, six-speed manual transmission, GRMN suspension tuning, GRMN brake calipers and brake rotors; GRMN dual exhaust, GRMN alloy wheels and tyres; different front and rear wing panels and bumper bars; rear wing; rear garnish; bucket seats; 4-point seat belts; roll cage; back skin tone interior and extra instrumentation (boost, water temperature and oil temperature gauges).

The vehicle was unveiled at the Nürburgring Circuit.

==== Toyota 86 concepts – Tokyo Auto Salon (2014) ====
Just like the year before, the 2014 Tokyo Auto Salon saw the presentation of various Toyota 86-based custom models and concepts.

===== Toyota GRMN 86 Concept =====
The GRMN 86 Concept is a version of the Toyota 86 that incorporates the technical expertise gained through the 24 Hours Nürburgring endurance race, achieving vehicle weight reduction, a lower centre of gravity, an enhanced powertrain and improved body rigidity. It includes an FA20 engine, six-speed manual transmission, 215/40R17 tyres, carbon fibre engine cover, roof, rear hatch, diffuser, side skirt, tail wing, seats; polycarbonate windows, reinforced engine parts, oil cooler, rewritten ECU, and mechanical limited-slip differential.

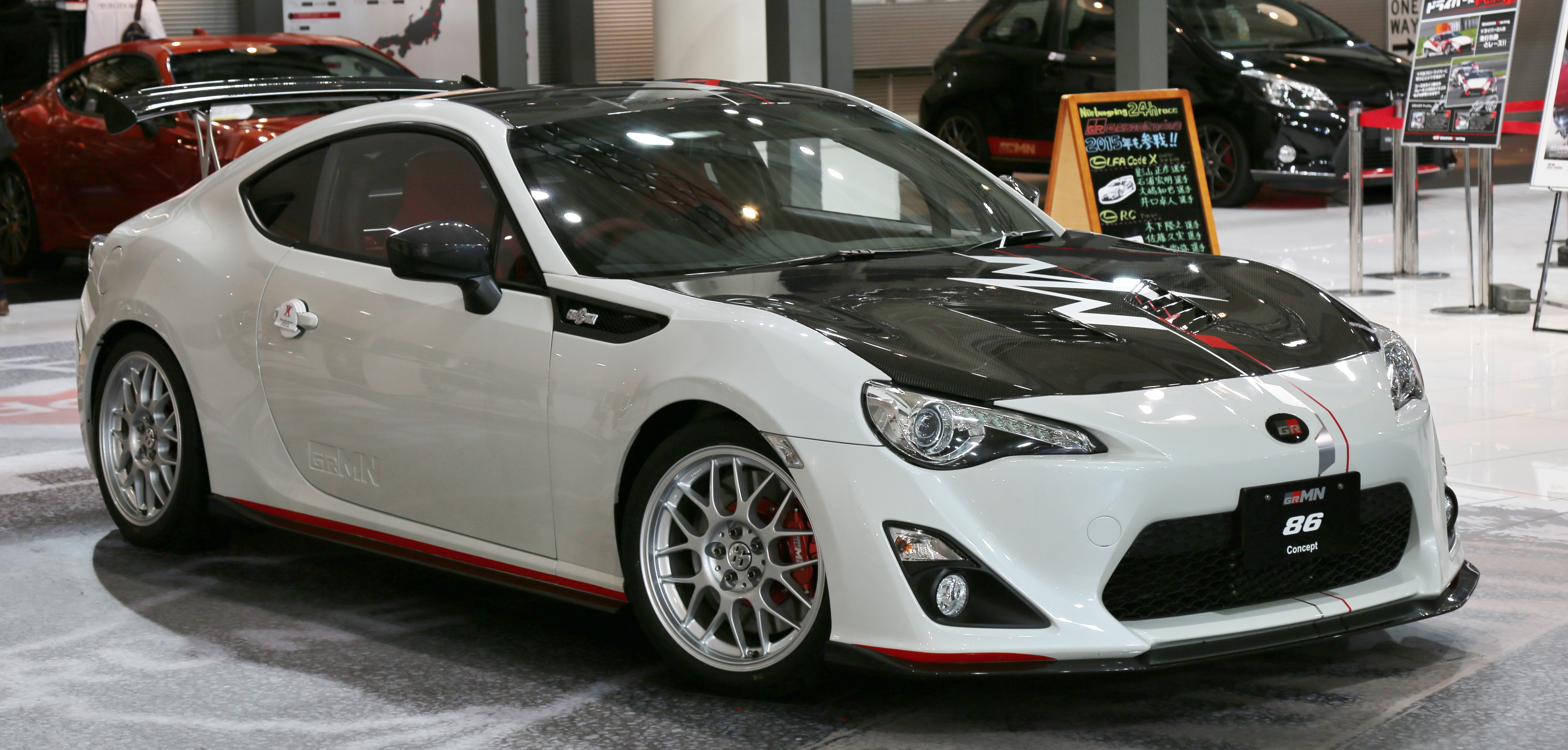
Front

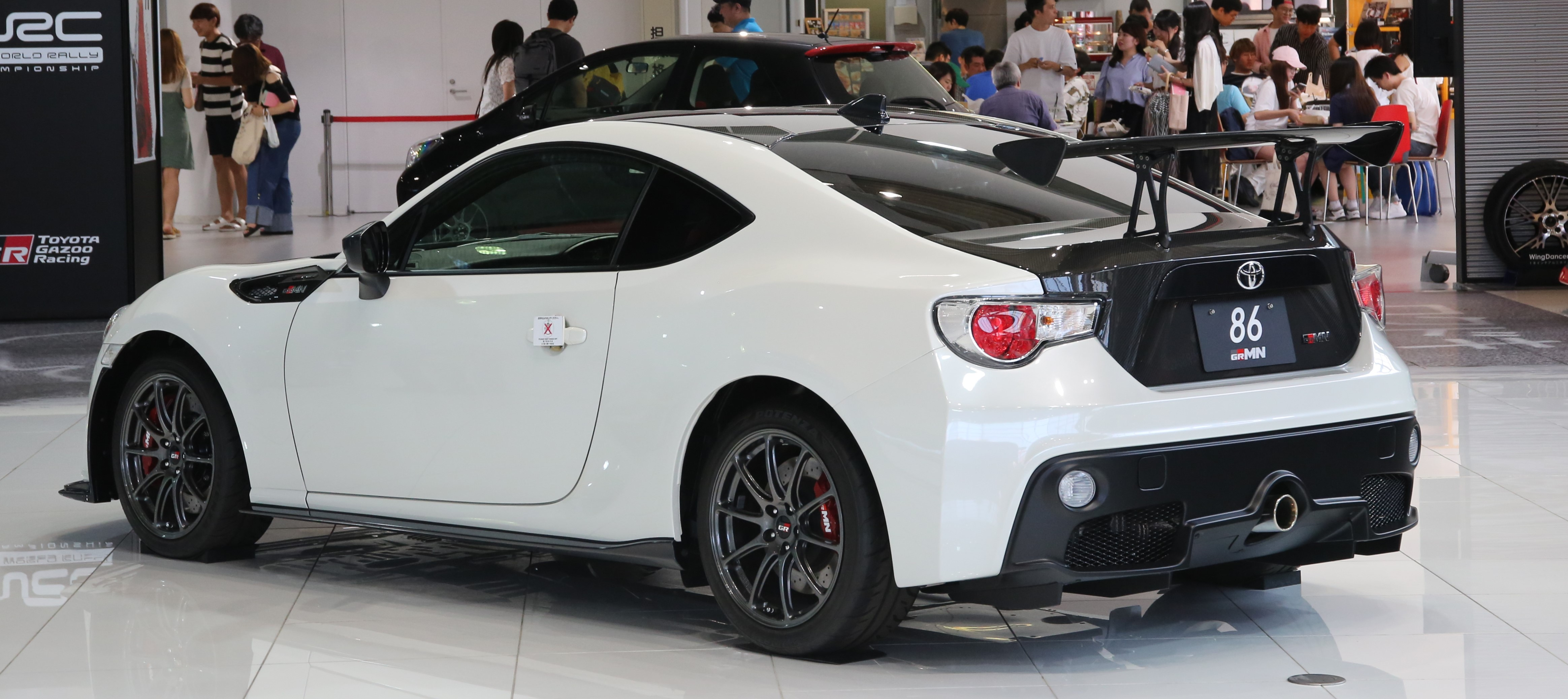
Rear

===== Toyota 86×Style Cb Spider =====
The 86xStyle Cb Spider (model ZN6-A2B8) is a convertible version of the 86 built by Toyota Original Accessory. It features a six-speed automatic transmission, wing garnish with side lamp, boot spoiler and licence garnish, rear combination lamp (in dark smoke plated), backup lamp rear bumper, spider aero bulge, rear diffuser integrated into rear bumper, one-off style Cb sport seat, leather-wrapped steering wheel, style Cb original meter panel/new decorative panel with lighting, Style Cb original floor mat, Brembo brakes with front 4-piston and rear 2-piston calipers and Goodyear Eagle LS Premium tyres (215/40R18 89W front, 225/45R18 91W rear).

===== Toyota Gazoo Racing TRD 86 =====
The Gazoo Racing TRD 86 is a race car version of the Toyota 86 for the TRD Rally Challenge. It is built by Gazoo Racing and includes a six-speed manual transmission.

===== Toyota Gazoo Racing LUCK 86 =====
The Gazoo Racing LUCK 86 is a race car version of the Toyota 86 for the JN3 class of the Japanese Rally Championship. It is built by Gazoo Racing and includes a six-speed manual transmission.

===== Toyota Gazoo Racing SPIRIT 86 =====
The Gazoo Racing SPIRIT 86 is a race car version of the Toyota 86 for the Super Taikyu Series. It is built by Gazoo Racing and includes a six-speed manual transmission.

===== Toyota 86 Supercharger =====
The 86 Supercharger produced by Team Netz with TOM'S is a version of the Toyota 86 built for the online community Area 86. It includes a six-speed manual transmission, Roots blower, exclusive ECU, water-cooled intercooler, exclusive muffler, original aero kit, Satin white pearl 37J body panel, TEAM NETZ original front bumper (made by ABS), TOM'S side step, TOM'S rear under spoiler, TOM'S ADVOX suspension kit with exclusive setting, TOM'S brake pads and brake line, 8.0J INSET44-inch TWS T66F wheel in original gun metal colour and 225/40R18 Michelin Pilot Sport 3 tyres.

===== Toyota TRD Griffon Concept 014 =====
The TRD Griffon Concept 014 is based on the 2013 TRD Griffon Concept. In turn, the 86 TRD Customize Concept 014 is based on the 86 TRD Griffon Concept 014, and features a roof fin, rear diffuser, HID bulb kit, winker bulb, full bucket driver seat, passenger sports seat, shoulder pad set, interior panel set (carbon), steering wheel and interior boot set, sport meter set (water temperature, oil temperature, oil pressure), leather shift knob (for manual transmission cars), knee pad, battery clamp, fuel cap cover, full length adjustable suspension set, pillow upper set, stabiliser set (front, rear), front strut tower bar, member brace set, door stabiliser set, sports air filter, high response muffler Ver.R, sound changer, circuit brake kit, clutch cover, clutch disc (sport phasing), flywheel, quick shift set (18-inch cast aluminium TRD TF6 18x7.5J-inch wheels, Goodyear EAGLE RS Sport 86spec 225/40R18 tyres), lug nut set (M12×P1.25), oil filler cap, sport oil filter, and radiator cap.

===== Toyota Autobacs G7 86 Potenza =====
The Toyota Autobacs G7 86 Potenza (No. 557) (model ZN6-VPNT8A) is a race car version of the Toyota 86 Racing built for the GAZOO Racing 86/BRZ Race.

===== Subaru Manatura Kota-R BRZ =====
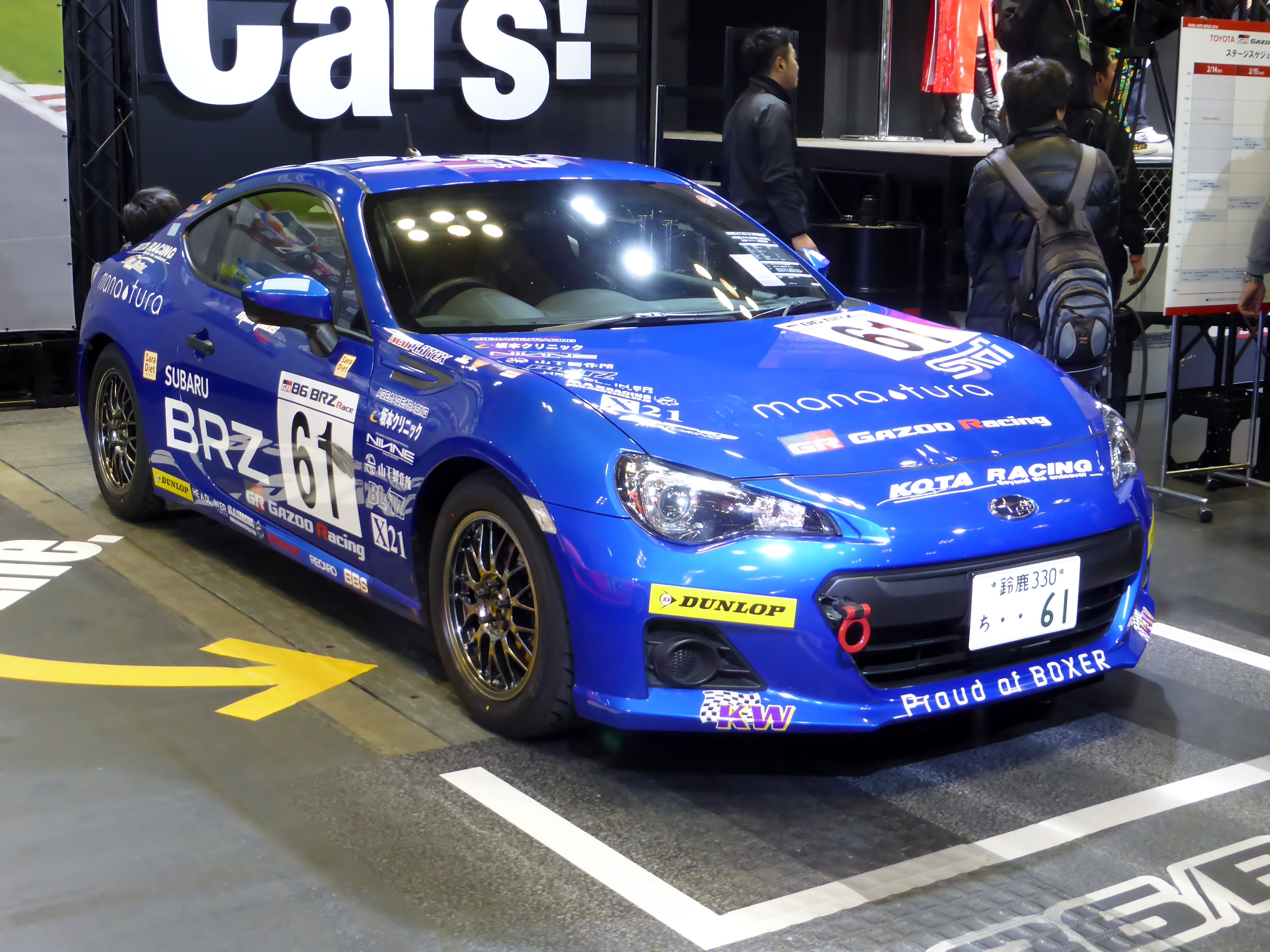
Subaru Manatura Kota-R

The Subaru Manatura Kota-R BRZ (No. 61) (DBA-ZC6) is a race car version of the Subaru BRZ RA Racing built for the Gazoo Racing 86/BRZ Race.

===== Toyota N1 Tech Potenza Win 86 =====
The Toyota N1 Tech Potenza Win 86 (No. 100) (ZN6-VPNT8A) is another race car version of the Toyota 86 Racing built for the Gazoo Racing 86/BRZ Race.

===== Toyota NETZ Gunma FK Massimo μ86 =====
The Toyota NETZ Gunma FK Massimo μ86 (No. 62) (ZN6-VPNT8A) is yet another version of the Toyota 86 Racing built for the Gazoo Racing 86/BRZ Race.

==== Scion FR-S T1 (2014) ====
Built by Los Angeles metal shop, Cartel Customs, and displayed at the 2014 SEMA Show, the Scion FR-S T1 is the first targa top version of any 86-based model. Apart from the Porsche 911-style removable roof, it features upgraded and lowered coil-over suspension, 19-in forged chrome wheels, upgrade braking system and a turbocharged engine with a centre exhaust tip. Inside it has an upgraded sound system and two-tone beige/black leather interior (including over the dashboard). The exterior is characterised by enlarged wheel arches and an integrated "duck tail" rear spoiler, and is painted in two-tone Azzurro California Blue with a contrasting black sill line up to the roof and rear louvre window.

==== Subaru STI Performance Concept (2015) ====
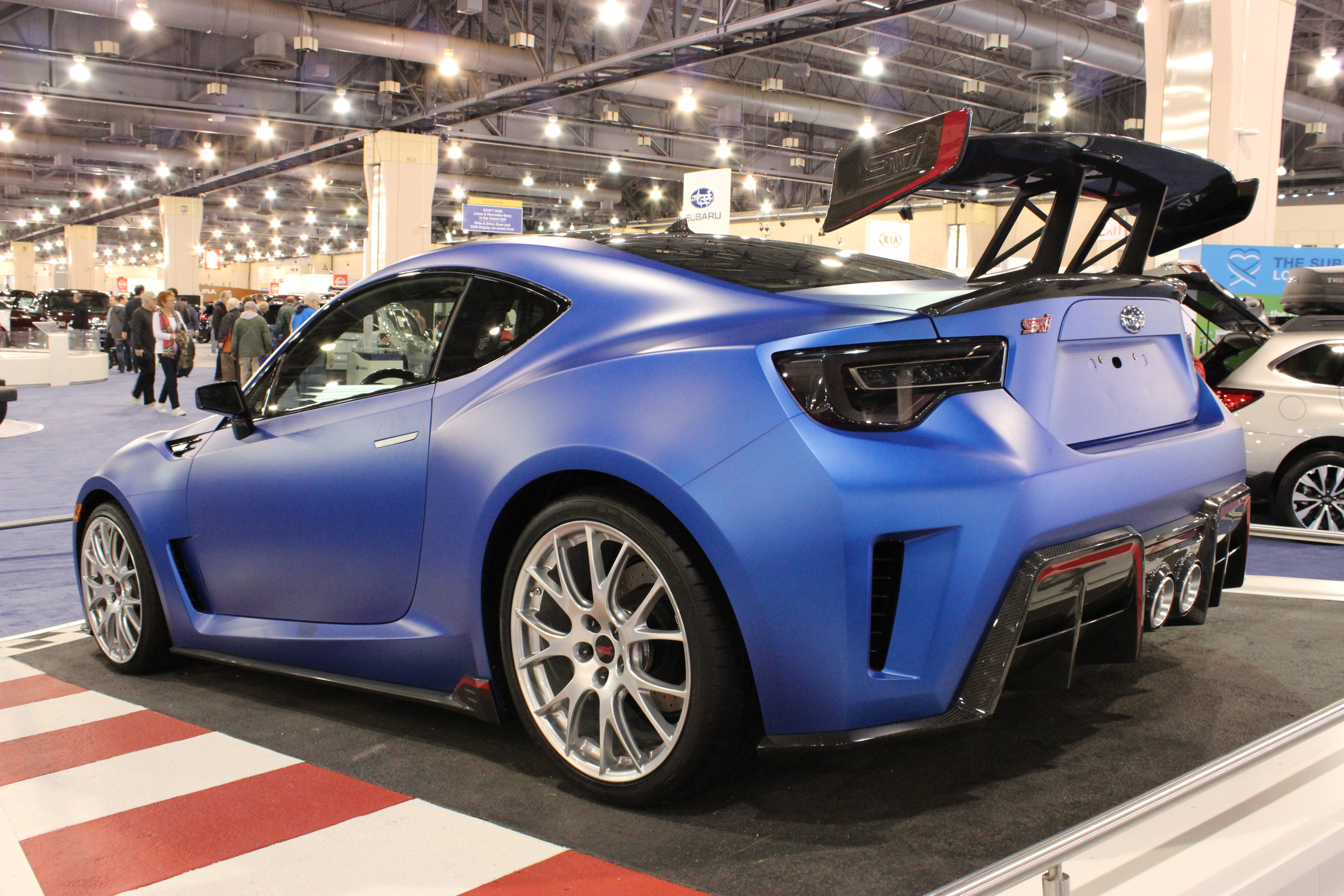
STI Performance Concept at Philadelphia Auto Show (2016)

Subaru unveiled the BRZ-based STI Performance Concept at the 2015 New York Auto Show. It stated that this concept car does not preview a production model but rather a visualisation of the future application of the STI program to the BRZ. The concept car uses the same turbocharged 2.0-litre engine employed in the BRZ GT300 race car, producing an estimated 220 kW (300 bhp) and 330 lb⋅ft (447 N⋅m). Even so, Subaru also stated that a turbocharger will not find its way into the BRZ production. Mechanically, the concept car has chassis, suspension and brake upgrades from the Japan-only BRZ tS. Externally, it is distinguished by LED headlights and taillights, new-style alloy wheels and a full bodykit featuring new-design front fascia, rear diffuser and rear wing.

==== Toyota 86 Shooting Brake Concept (2016) ====
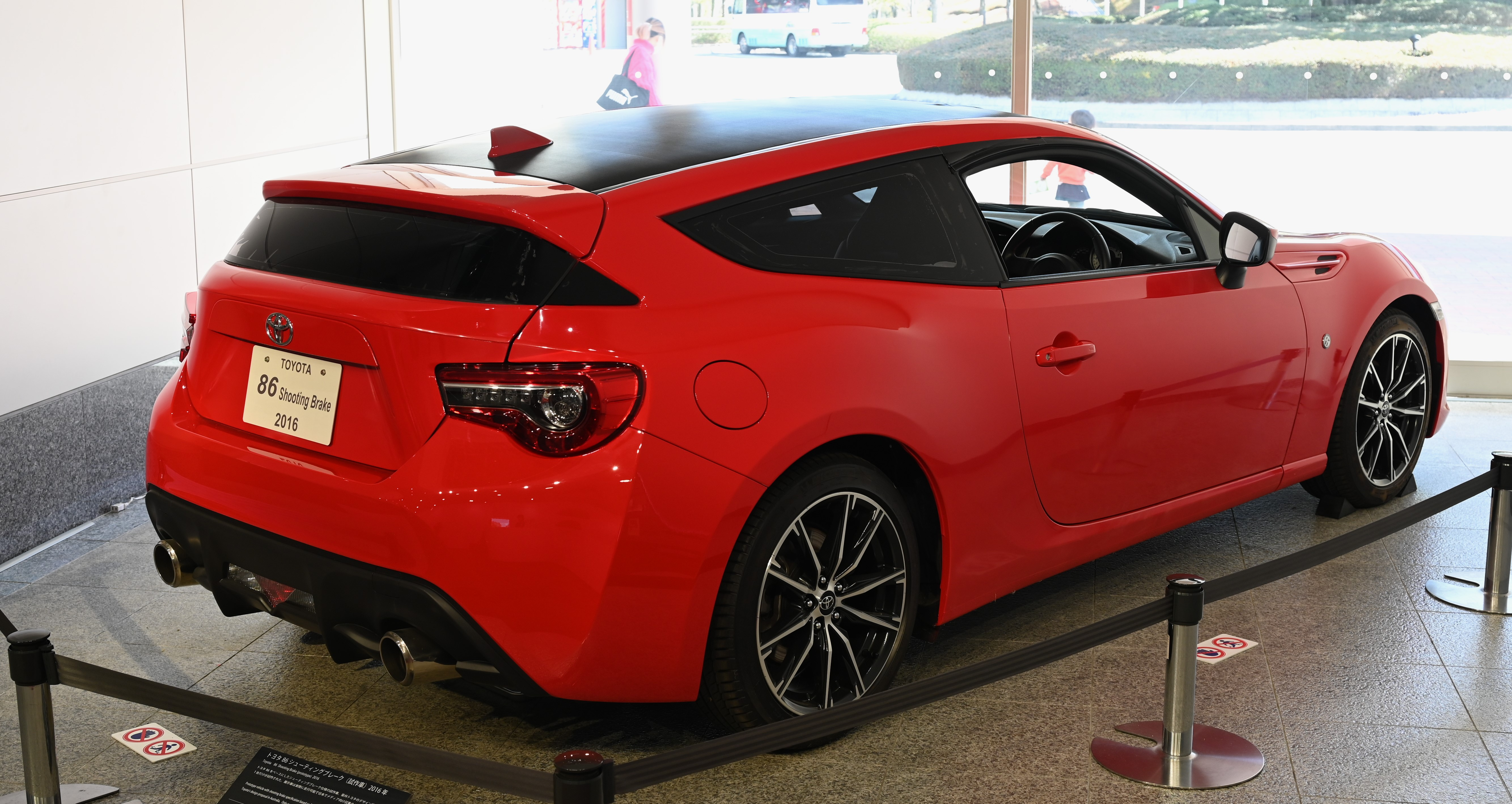
Toyota 86 Shooting Brake Concept

The Toyota 86 Shooting Brake Concept was displayed in Sydney, Australia on 6 May 2016 and at the Toyota Festival of 86 in Canberra, Australia on 7 May 2016. Toyota's global chief engineer Tetsuya Tada saw a quarter scale clay model of the car during a trip to the Australian branch in 2014 and arranged for a full scale, fully function version to be built in Japan by Toyota's Takumi ("artisan") craftsmen. Tada said, "while we never say never, and I would love this concept to become a production reality, it is very much a concept that demonstrates the passion within Toyota for cars that are fun to drive". Commenting on the new car, Toyota's Australian Divisional Manager National Marketing Brad Cramb said, "The Toyota 86 lends itself perfectly to a concept that expands its appeal with added versatility while retaining its sleek and sporty coupe styling and sharp, responsive driving character."

==== Toyota 86 Fujiwara Tofu Shop (2016) ====
In 2016, Toyota UK created a "Fujiwara Tofu Shop" version of the car as a homage to the manga Initial D and the car the protagonist drives, an AE86 Sprinter Trueno.

=== Safety ===
ANCAP test results* Toyota 86 (2012)
Test	Score
Overall	5 /5 stars
Frontal offset	14.97/16
Side impact	15.43/16
Pole	2/2
Seat belt reminders	2/3
Whiplash protection	Good
Pedestrian protection	Adequate
Electronic stability control	Standard

ANCAP test results* Subaru BRZ (2012)
Test	Score
Overall	5 /5 stars
Frontal offset	14.97/16
Side impact	15.43/16
Pole	2/2
Seat belt reminders	2/3
Whiplash protection	Good
Pedestrian protection	Adequate
Electronic stability control	Standard

=== Marketing ===
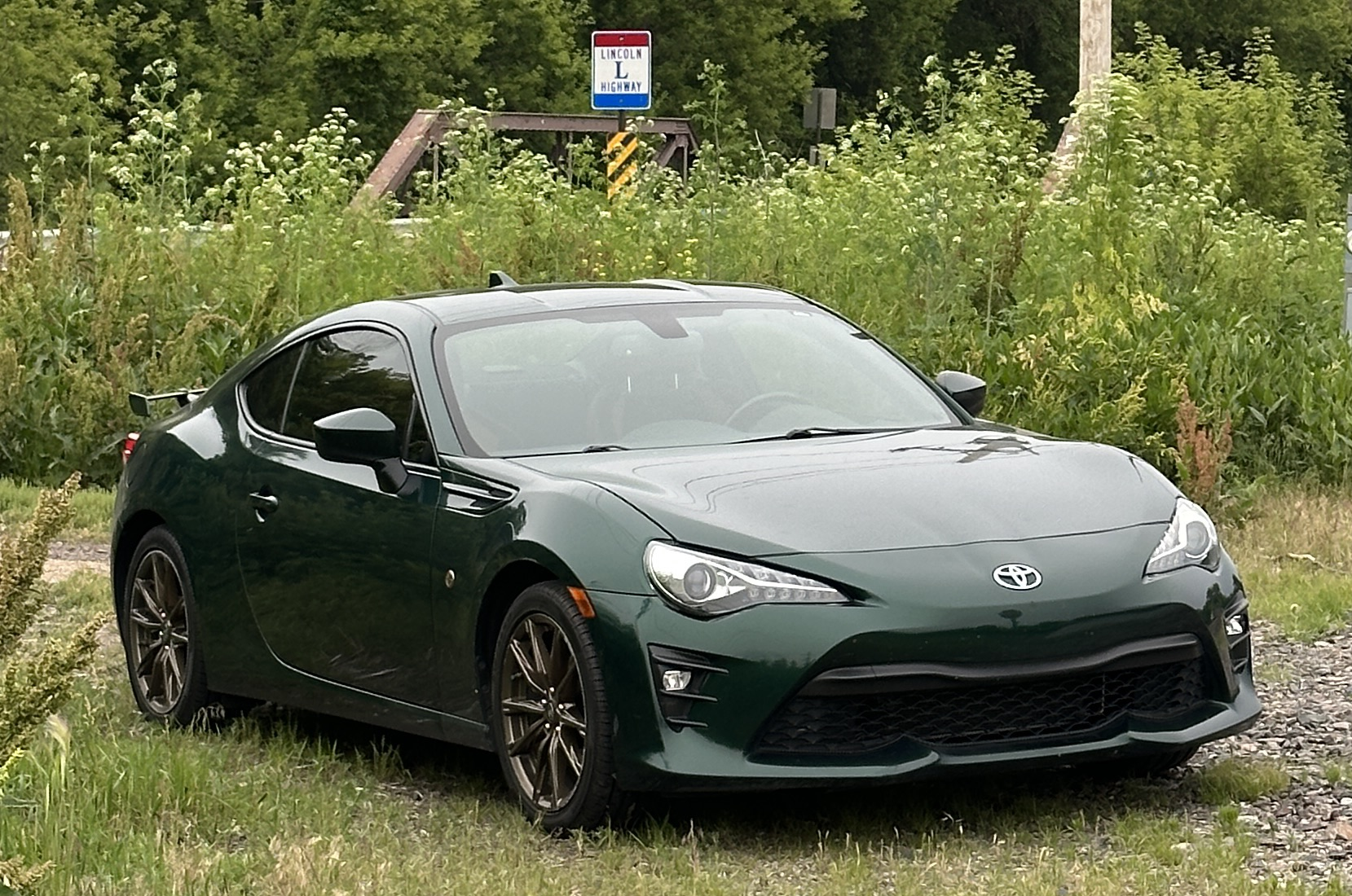
A 2020 Toyota 86 Hakone edition

At the Subaru BRZ's market launch, a 2-part film documented the car's development. In Canada, a TV commercial titled Scorched was shot at Queen and McCaul St. in Toronto.

In Australia, Subaru BRZ was the first new car ever to be sold on that market exclusively online, with orders opening on 16 July 2012. It was also marketed with free servicing for 3 years or 60,000 km. According to Subaru this sale concept was a success, after the entire 2012 Australian allocation of 201 cars was sold in under 3 hours. The first buyer was able to secure their car in less than 20 minutes from the site going live. This sale process was implemented as a consequence of the demand for the Toyota 86 far outstripping supply (resulting in long delivery times) and a low BRZ supplies for Australia. As of 1 January 2014, the vehicle became available both online and at dealerships, with free servicing no longer included in the purchase.

Scion made a similar decision in the United States, creating the 'First 86' program to allow 86 buyers to take delivery of their cars before the general public sales. On 12 January 2012 users had eight hours and six minutes to submit their requests to a program website. Winners were required to take their confirmation number and $500 to a dealer within 96 hours to claim their cars. Scion produced a commercial called Close Call featuring Ken Gushi avoiding a collision with a deer while driving Scion FR-S in Mt. Diablo State Park in Northern California.

A British Toyota GT86 commercial titled The Real Deal was banned for encouraging motorists to drive irresponsibly.

The 2020 model year was offered in the special "Hakone" edition. Named for the Hakone Turnpike, it featured a glossy "Hakone Green" colour(marketed as "British racing green" in Japan) with matching Bronze rims and interior. It was otherwise identical to the GT trim level.

== Second generation (ZN8/ZD8; 2021) ==
Second generation
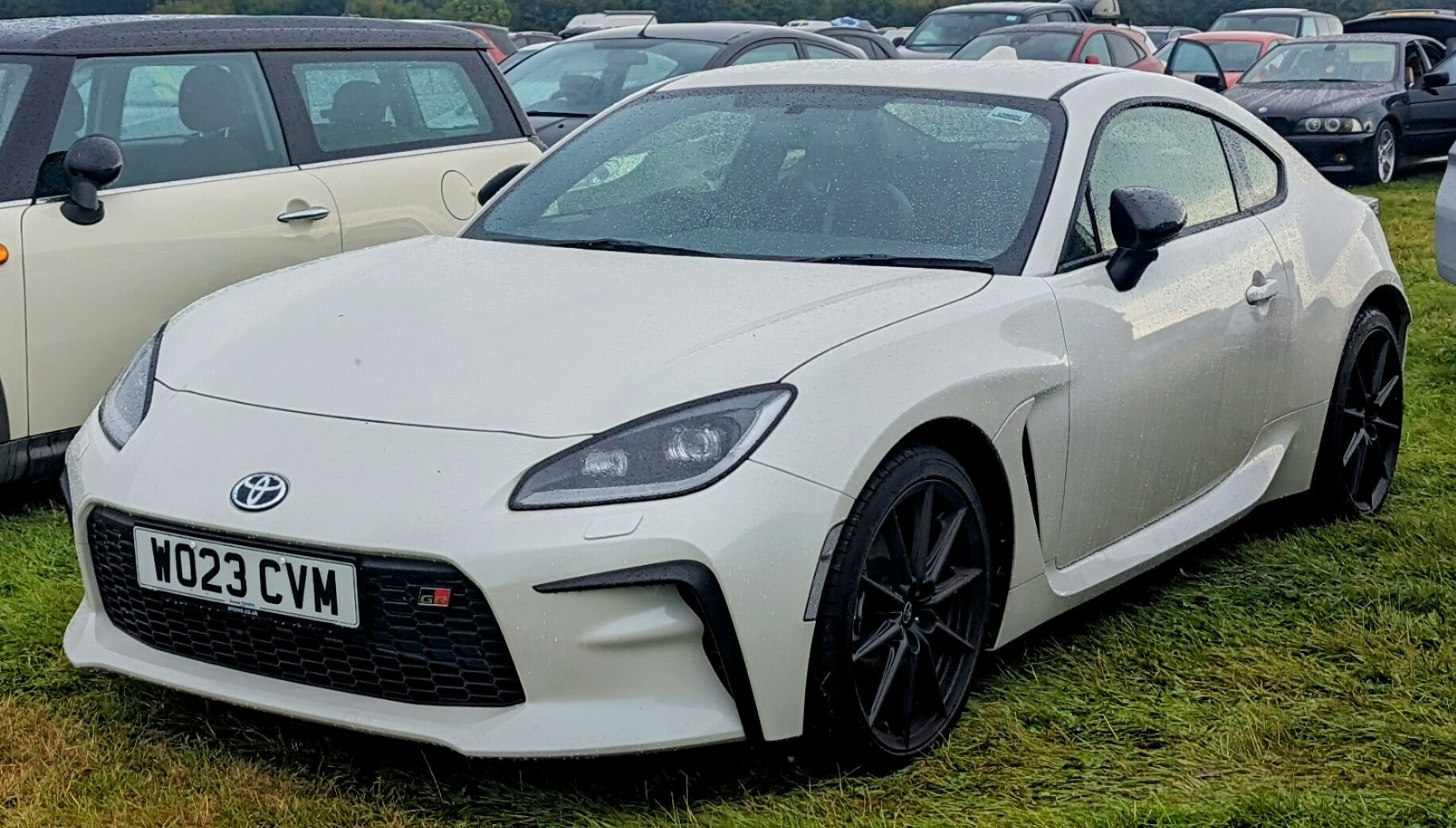
- 2023 Toyota GR86 (ZN8)

Overview
- Model code: ZN8 (Toyota); ZD8 (Subaru)
- Also called: Subaru BRZ; Toyota GR86
- Production: July 2021 – present (BRZ); October 2021 – present (GR86)
- Model years: 2022–present
- Designer: Koichi Matsumoto (project chief designer); Kosuke Kubo and Kazuhiko Ito (GR86 exterior); Kazuki Tanaka and Yuka Kanazawa (interior)

Powertrain
- Engine: 2.4 L FA24D H4
- Power output: 231–235 PS (170–173 kW; 228–232 hp)
- Transmission: 6-speed Toyota TL70 (Aisin AZ6) manual; 6-speed A960E automatic

Dimensions
- Wheelbase: 2,575 mm (101.4 in)
- Length: 4,265 mm (167.9 in)
- Width: 1,775 mm (69.9 in)
- Height: 1,310 mm (51.6 in) (including antenna)
- Kerb weight: 1,270–1,307 kg (2,800–2,881 lb)

The second-generation BRZ debuted on 18 November 2020 and went on sale in the US in late 2021. The Toyota version was introduced later on 5 April 2021, briefly named the "GR 86". It was later renamed "GR86", without the space, for digital marketing reasons.

The roof, bonnet and front wings are made from aluminium to lower the vehicle's centre of gravity and reduce the weight gain from the engine and safety features. The second-generation BRZ and GR86 architecture adopts elements from the Subaru Global Platform (SGP), claiming 50 percent more torsional rigidity than its predecessor.

In August 2026, the GR86 received minor updates such as a new EyeSight triple camera replaced the two camera setup, and the automatic transmission option for GR86 Cup Car Basic grade. The Solid Gray, which was previously available in the first generation 86, was reintroduced. The updated GR86 went to sale on 28 August 2026.

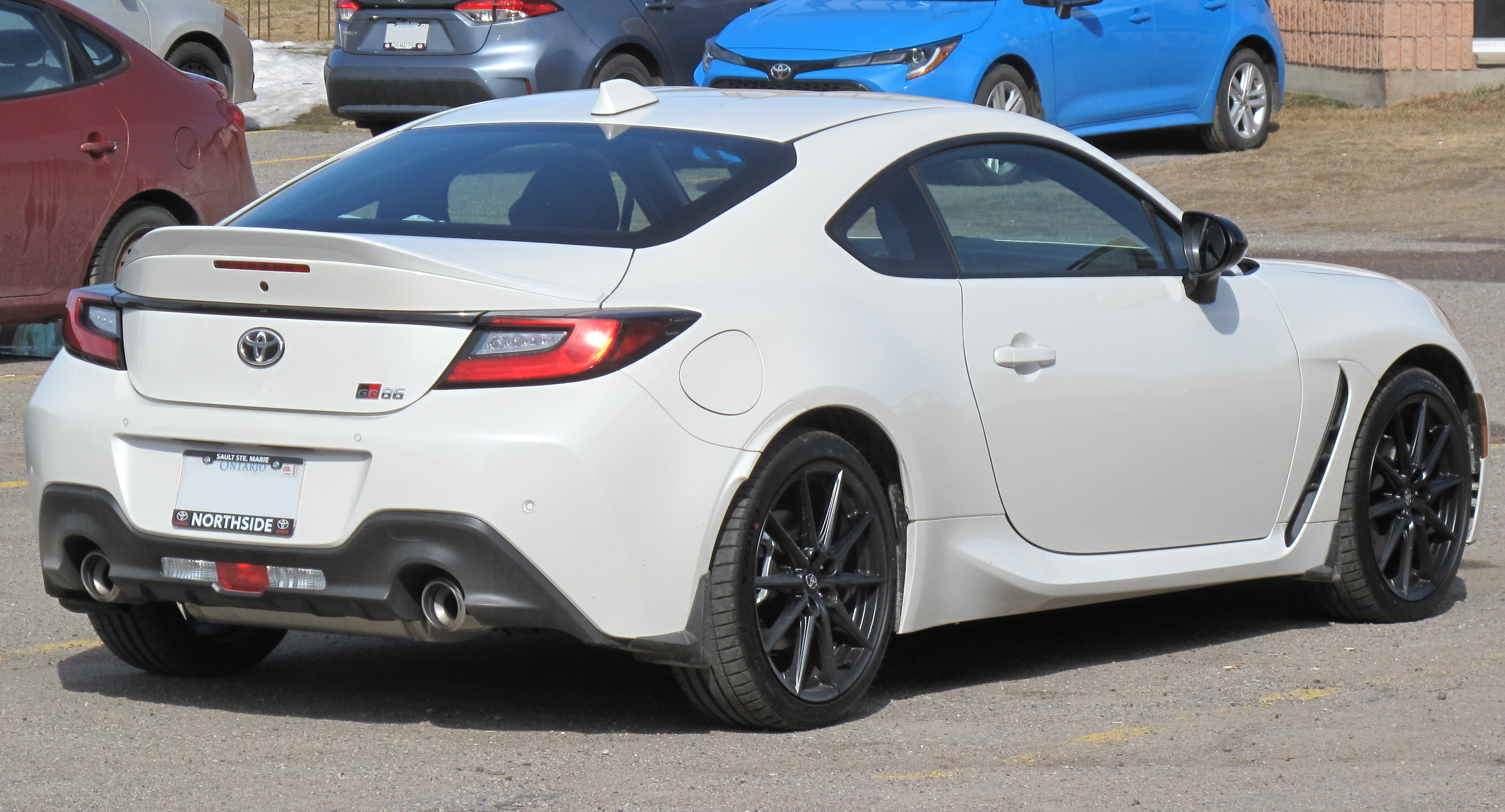
Rear

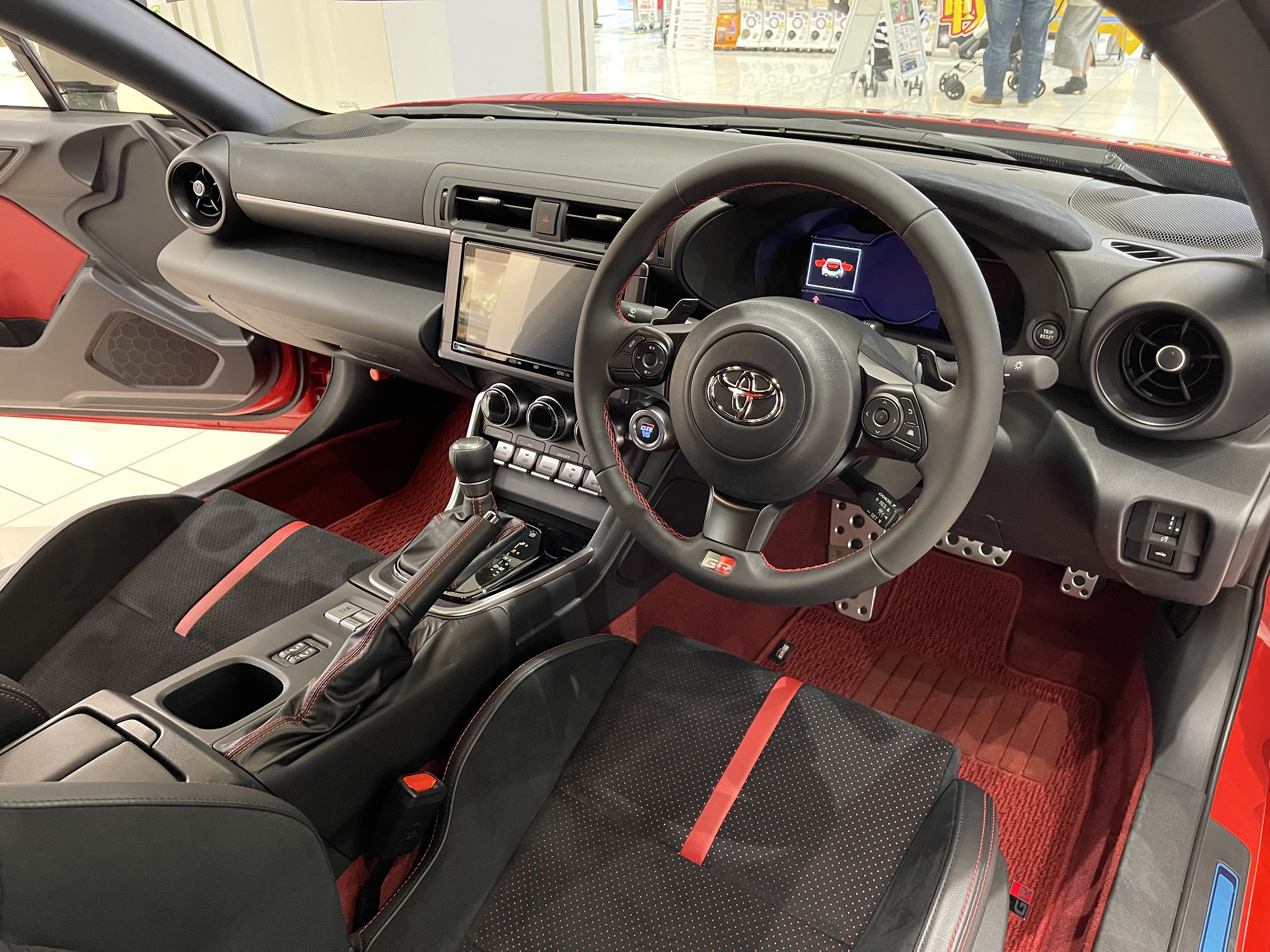
Interior

=== Subaru BRZ ===
Subaru uses the FA24D designation for the new engine. It has a displacement of 2,387 cc (145.7 cu in) using a 94 mm × 86 mm (3.7 in × 3.4 in) bore and stroke, with a power output of 231–235 PS (170–173 kW; 228–232 hp) at 7,000 rpm and a torque output of 250 N⋅m (184 lb⋅ft; 25 kg⋅m) at 3,700 rpm. According to Subaru, a naturally aspirated engine was chosen to meet the goal of developing "the ultimate pure sports car". Compared to the previous gen FA20 it retains a free-revving character, with a larger cylinder bore increasing peak torque at a lower rpm.

When tested by Car and Driver, the BRZ achieved a 0–97 km/h (0–60 mph) time of 5.4 seconds, with the top speed electronically limited to 225 km/h (140 mph).

Vehicles equipped with an automatic transmission (and manual transmission, starting from 2024) include Subaru's advanced driver-assistance system, using Eyesight-branded stereoscopic cameras; however, the BRZ/GR86 deletes the assisted steering feature to suit the sporty nature of the car.

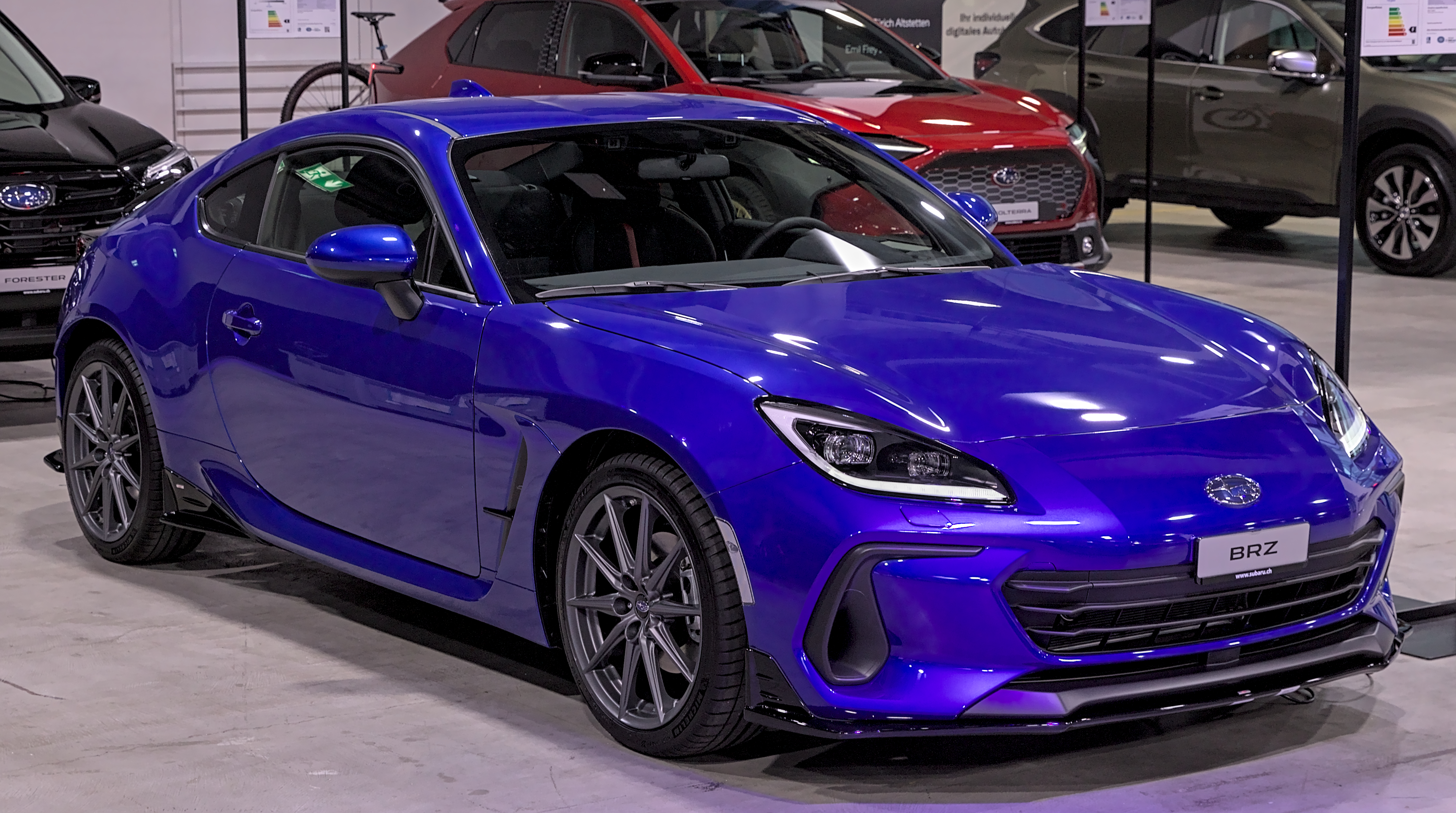
Subaru BRZ [with STI Aero Kit] (ZD8)

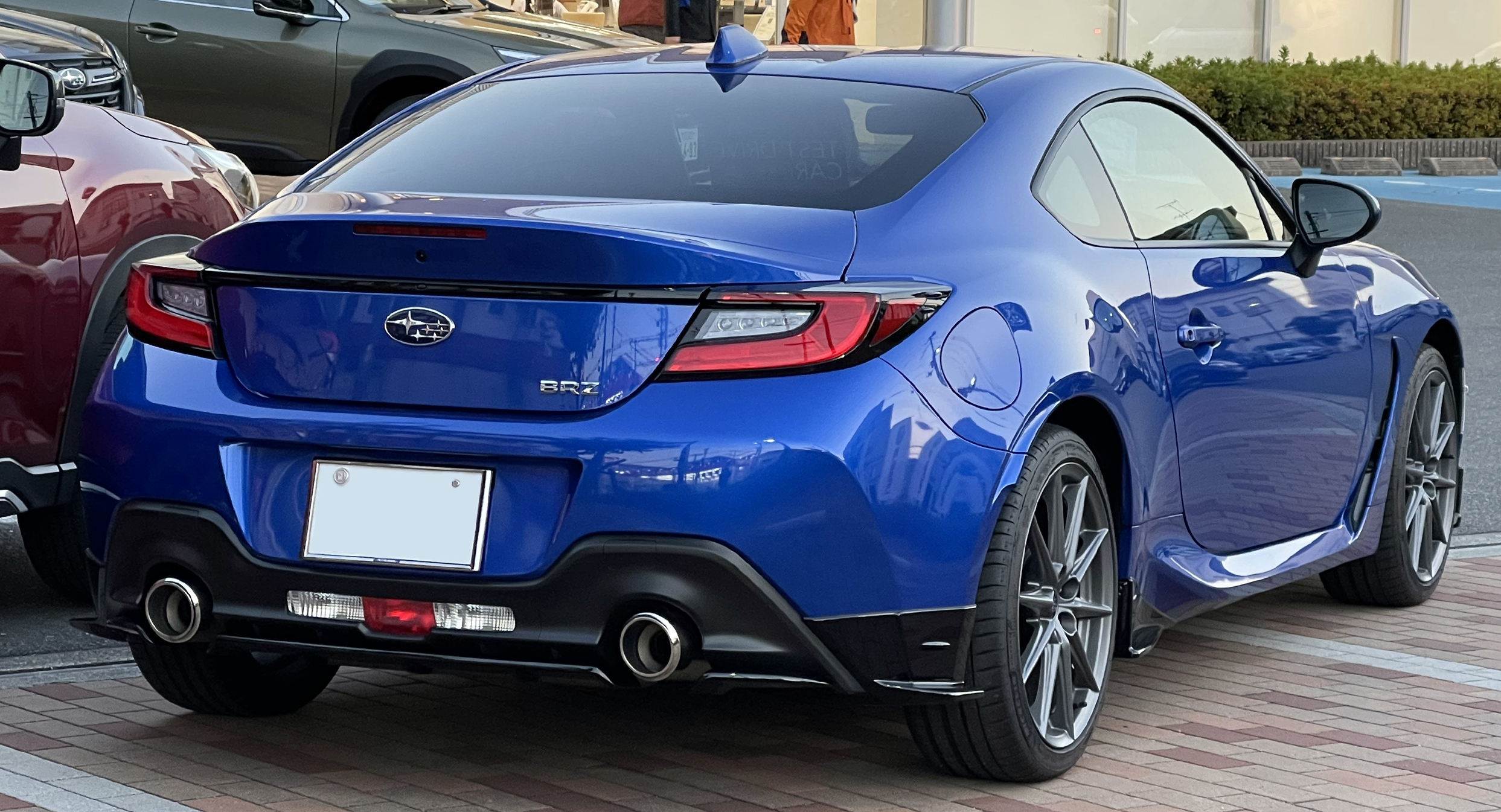
Subaru BRZ (ZD8, Japan)

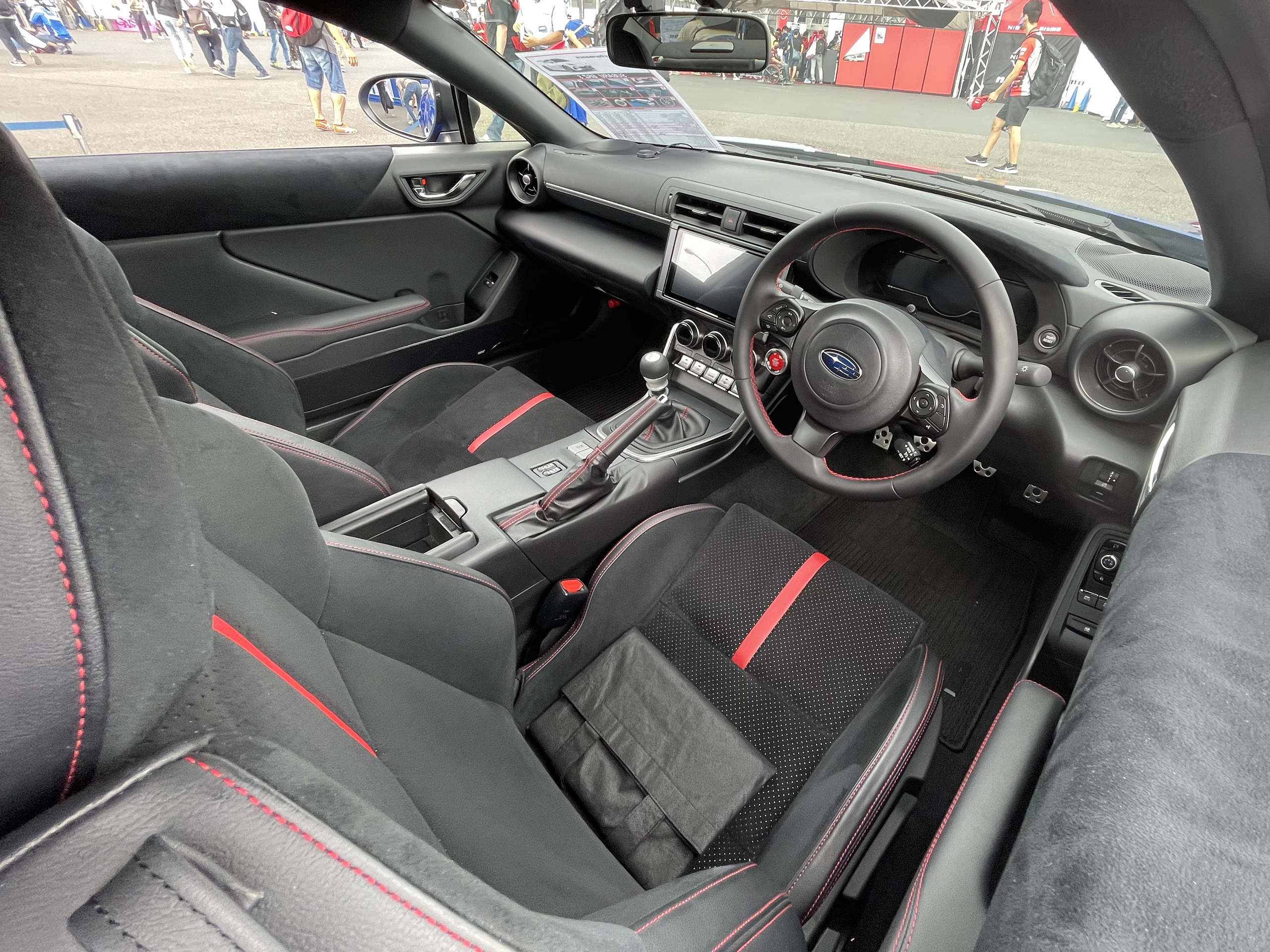
Interior

==== BRZ tS ====
In July 2023, for the 2024 model year, Subaru released the BRZ tS (tS standing for "tuned by STI") as a new trim that features an upgraded interior with blue stitching, an STI-themed instrument cluster, a red STI engine start button, golden 4-piston Brembo brakes in the front, 2-piston brakes in the back, upgraded suspension, black metallic-finish wheels, black mirror caps, and a black antenna fin. It also features Subaru's Eyesight system with the manual transmission along with the rest of the 2024 model trims. The tS trim is only available with the manual transmission, and is based on the Limited trim, featuring heated seats and a similar interior design. While previous tS editions of the cars were under limited production, this one is mass-produced. The customer is able to choose the car's colour, add accessories, etc. It was released again in 2024, for the 2025 model year.

Front

Rear

=== Special editions ===
==== 10th Anniversary Special Edition ====
In 2022, for the 2023 model year, a new 10th Anniversary Special Edition ("SE") 86 is available in North America and Japan. Celebrating ten years since the release of the Scion FR-S in North America and Toyota 86 in Japan, and based on the top-tier Premium trim level, the 86 Special Edition is finished in a unique "Solar Shift" (Orange) exterior paint colour, with unique Matte Black-finished eighteen-inch forged aluminium-alloy wheels, black exterior side mirror caps, a "Duck-Bill" rear spoiler, a black rear deck (boot) lid accent bar, and black "C"-pillar stripe decals. A Gazoo Racing (GR)-tuned performance exhaust system with black chrome-finished exhaust tips is also included with the Special Edition 86. In US, Production limited to 860 units.

The 10th Special Edition was also sold in Japan in same year alongside the BRZ 10th Anniversary Edition. Based on the RZ variant, sales were limited to 24 July to 30 September.

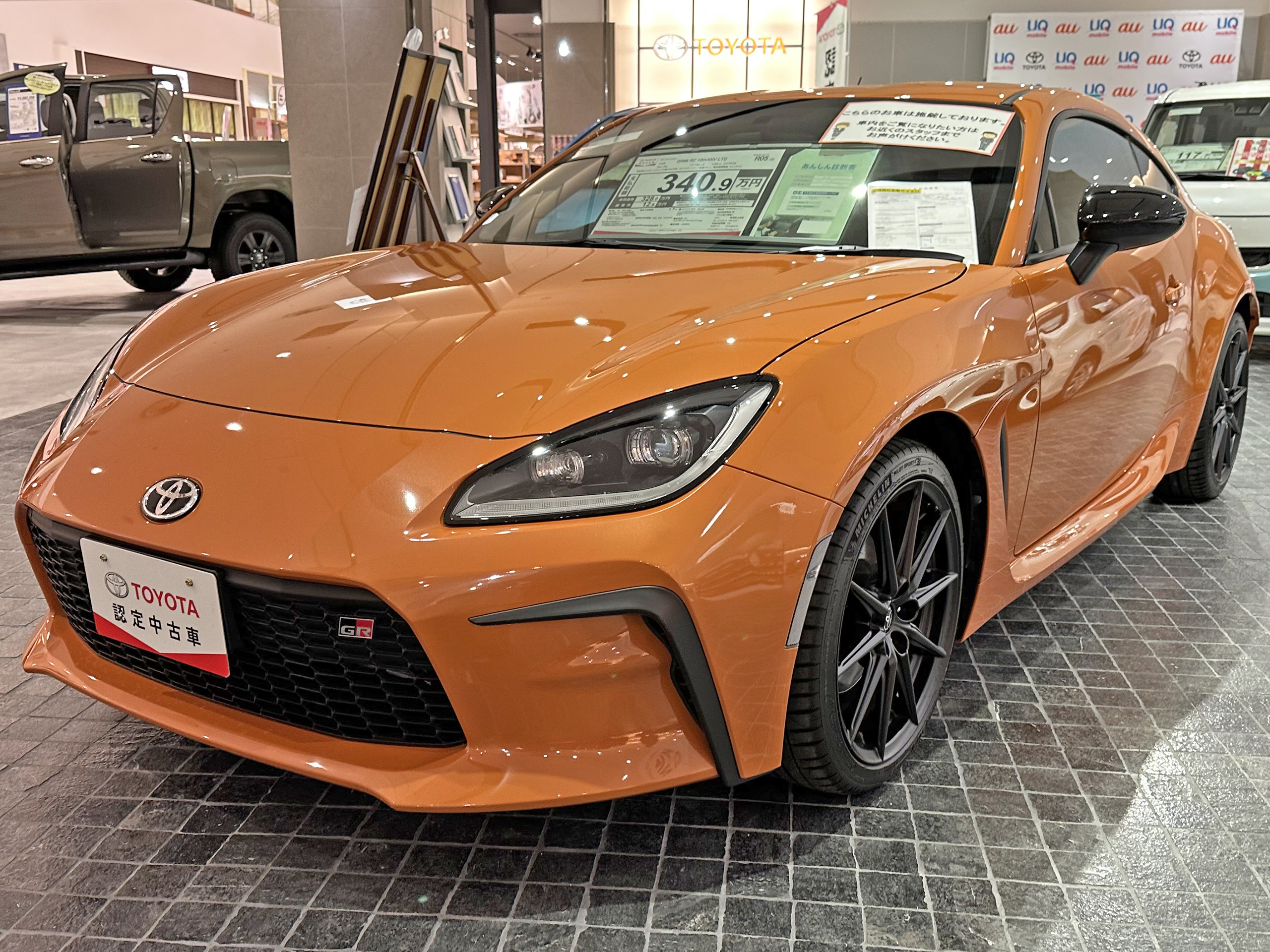
GR86 10th Anniversary Special Edition (Japan)

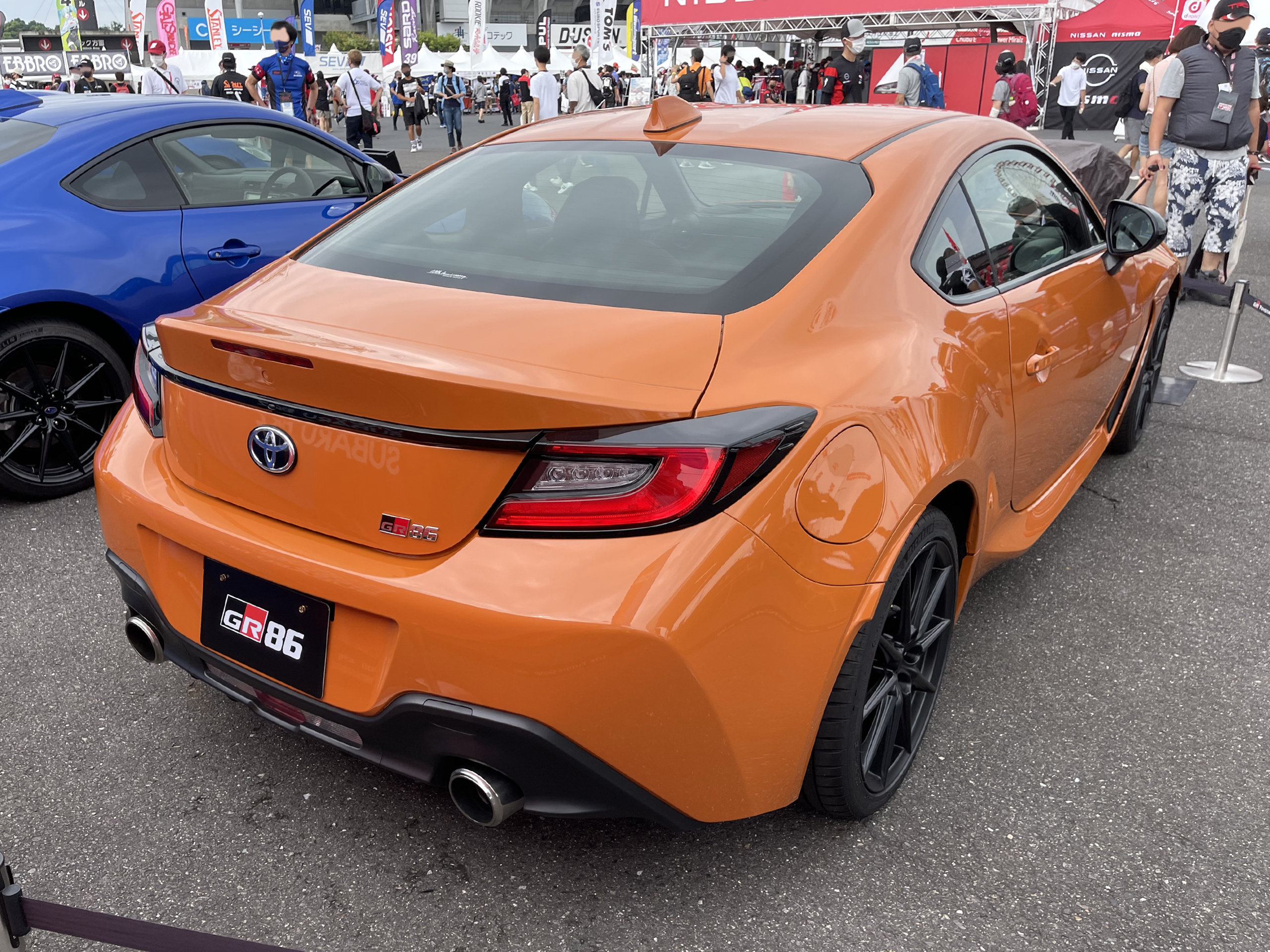
Rear (Japan)

==== Trueno Edition ====
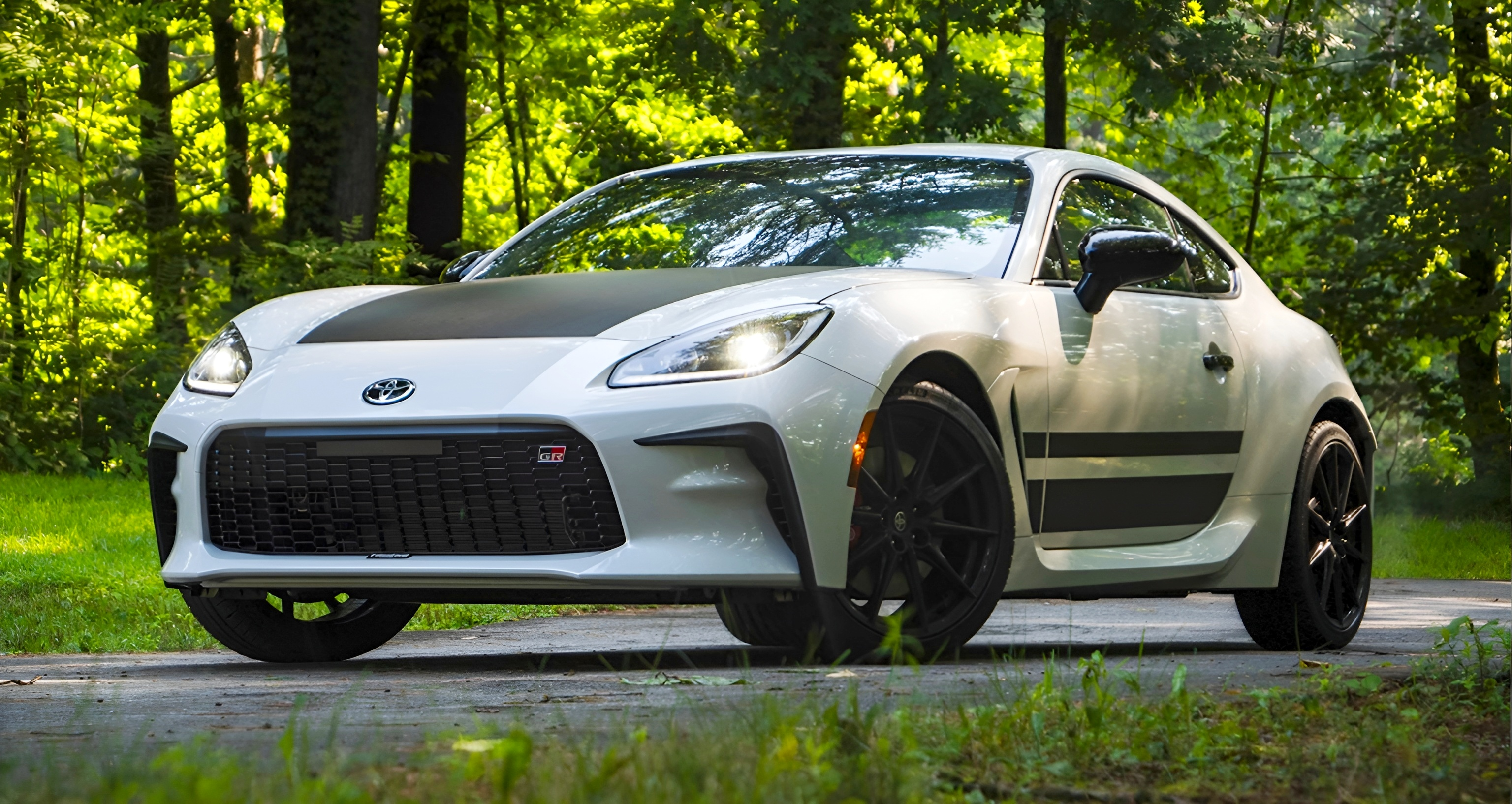

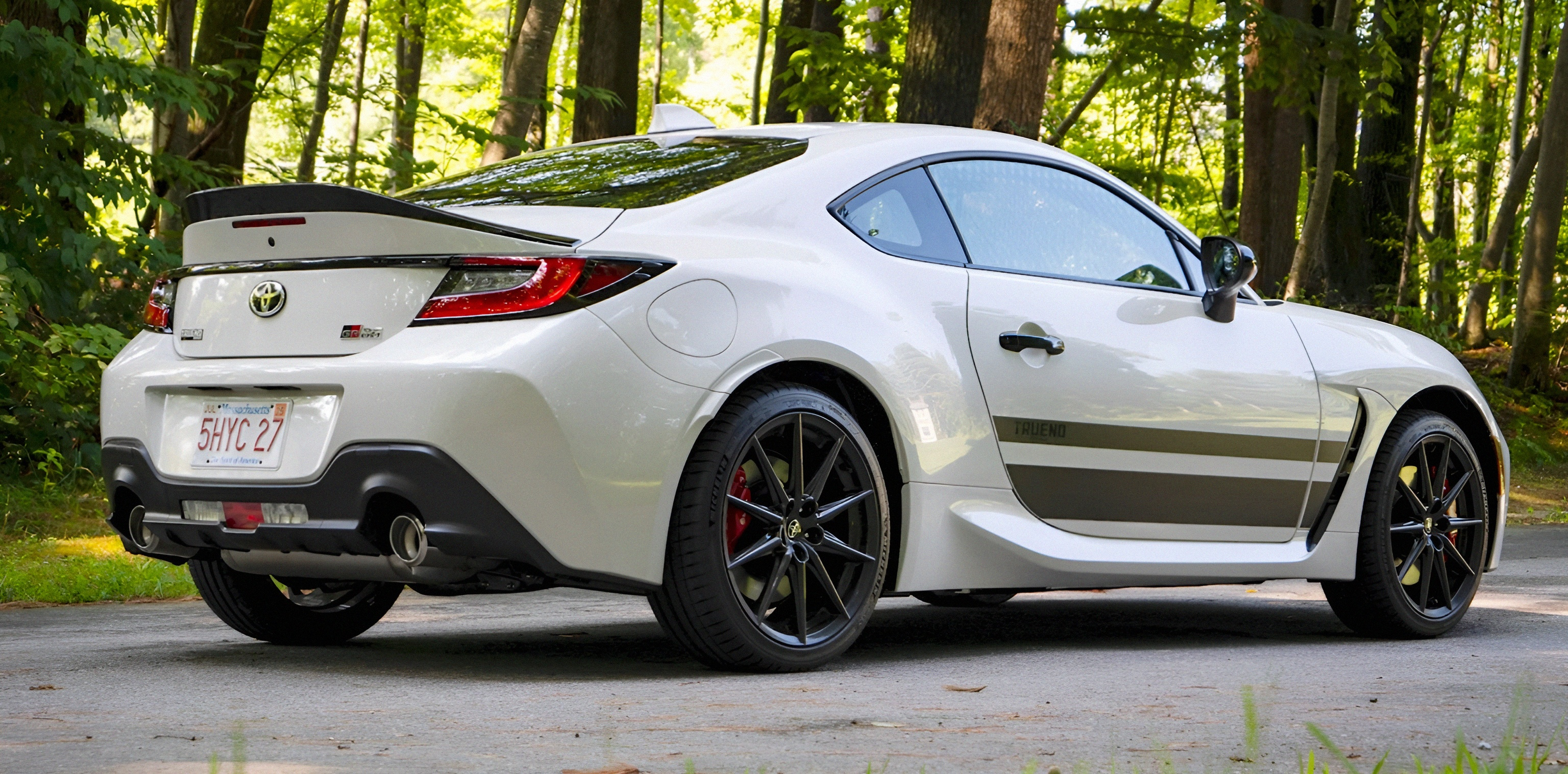
Toyota GR86 Trueno Edition (ZN8, North America)

In June 2023, for the 2024 model year, another limited edition of the GR86 called the Trueno Edition was released exclusively in North America. It was made to celebrate 40 years since the release of the AE86 Sprinter Trueno in Japan. It came with a Matte Black-finished bonnet, a white exterior paint colour with black stripe decals on the doors and front fenders resembling the original "High-Tech Two-Tone" colour option of the AE86, black exterior side mirrors, a black "Duck-Bill" rear spoiler, and is fitted with Matte Black-finished aluminium alloy wheels. Like the Special Edition 86, production of this variant is limited to 860 units.

==== Kongō-class 86 ====
On 12 June 2024, Toyota began accepting orders for the Kongō-class 86 series, a collaboration between Kantai Collection and Toyota's sports car, the GR86.

This vehicle debuted at a Kantai Collection real-life event held at Fuji Speedway by C2 Kikan, and features a special exterior design inspired by the four Kongō-class battlecruisers (金剛型姉妹). The line-up includes four types: "Kongo 86," "Hiei 86," "Kirishima 86," and "Haruna 86". Only 8 units are planned.

==== Hakone Edition ====
On 12 July 2024, Toyota announced the GR86 Hakone Edition for the 2025 model year in North America. Like the 2020 86 Hakone Edition that preceded it, the GR86 Hakone Edition pays tribute to the Hakone Turnpike in Japan. It is offered in a single colour, Ridge Green with tan leather seats and satin bronze wheels, and limited to 860 units.

==== Yuzu Edition/Yellow Limited ====
In April 2025, Toyota announced the Yuzu Edition for the 2026 model year in North America. The exclusive colour, Yuzu Yellow, is a nod to the Scion FR-S Release Series 1.0. Like the previous three limited editions, the Yuzu Edition is limited to 860 units.

In Japan, Toyota announced the "Yellow Limited" in September 2025. The Yellow Limited is based on the RZ grade with the addition of yellow stitching in the cabin, grey wheels, Brembo brakes and Sachs shock absorbers. It is limited to 300 units.

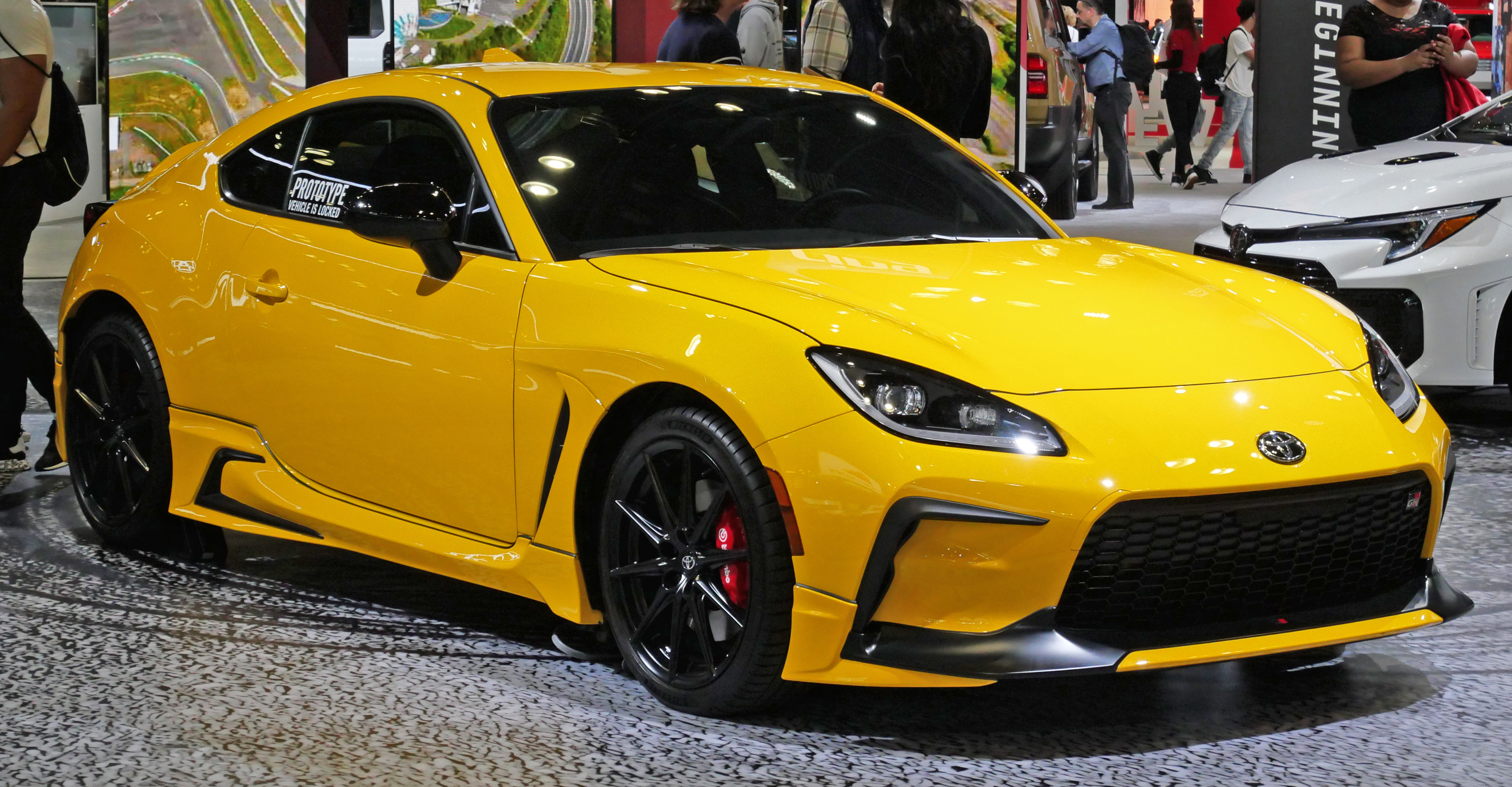
Toyota GR86 Yuzu Edition

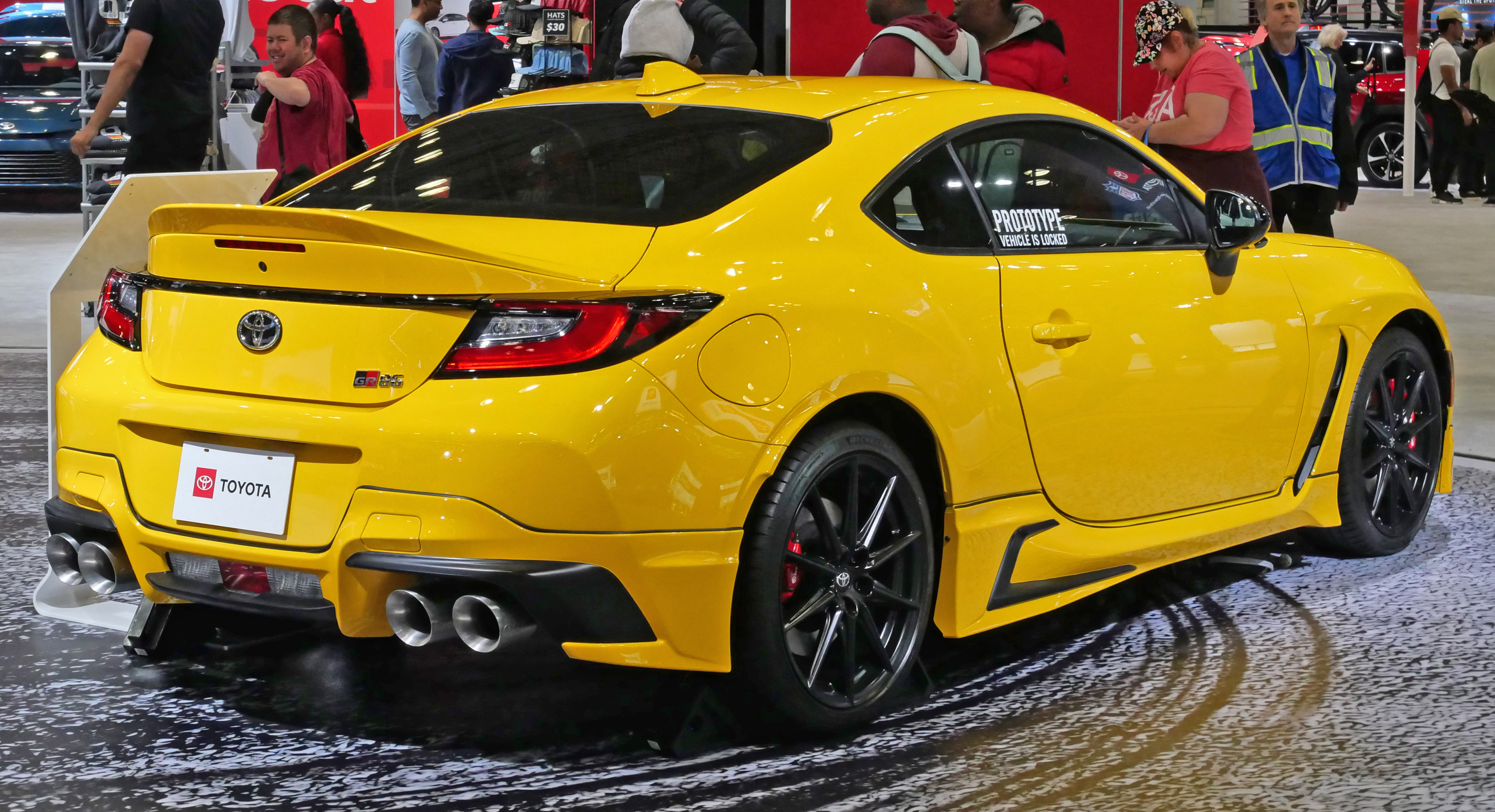
Rear

=== Safety ===
The 2022 BRZ was tested by the IIHS and its top trim received a Top Safety Pick+ award:

IIHS scores
Small overlap front (Driver)	Good	
Small overlap front (Passenger)	Good	
Moderate overlap front	Good	
Side (original test)	Good	
Roof strength	Good	
Head restraints and seats	Good	
Headlights	Good	
Front crash prevention (Vehicle-to-Vehicle)	Superior	optional
Front crash prevention (Vehicle-to-Pedestrian, day)	Superior	optional
Child seat anchors (LATCH) ease of use	Acceptable	

== Awards ==
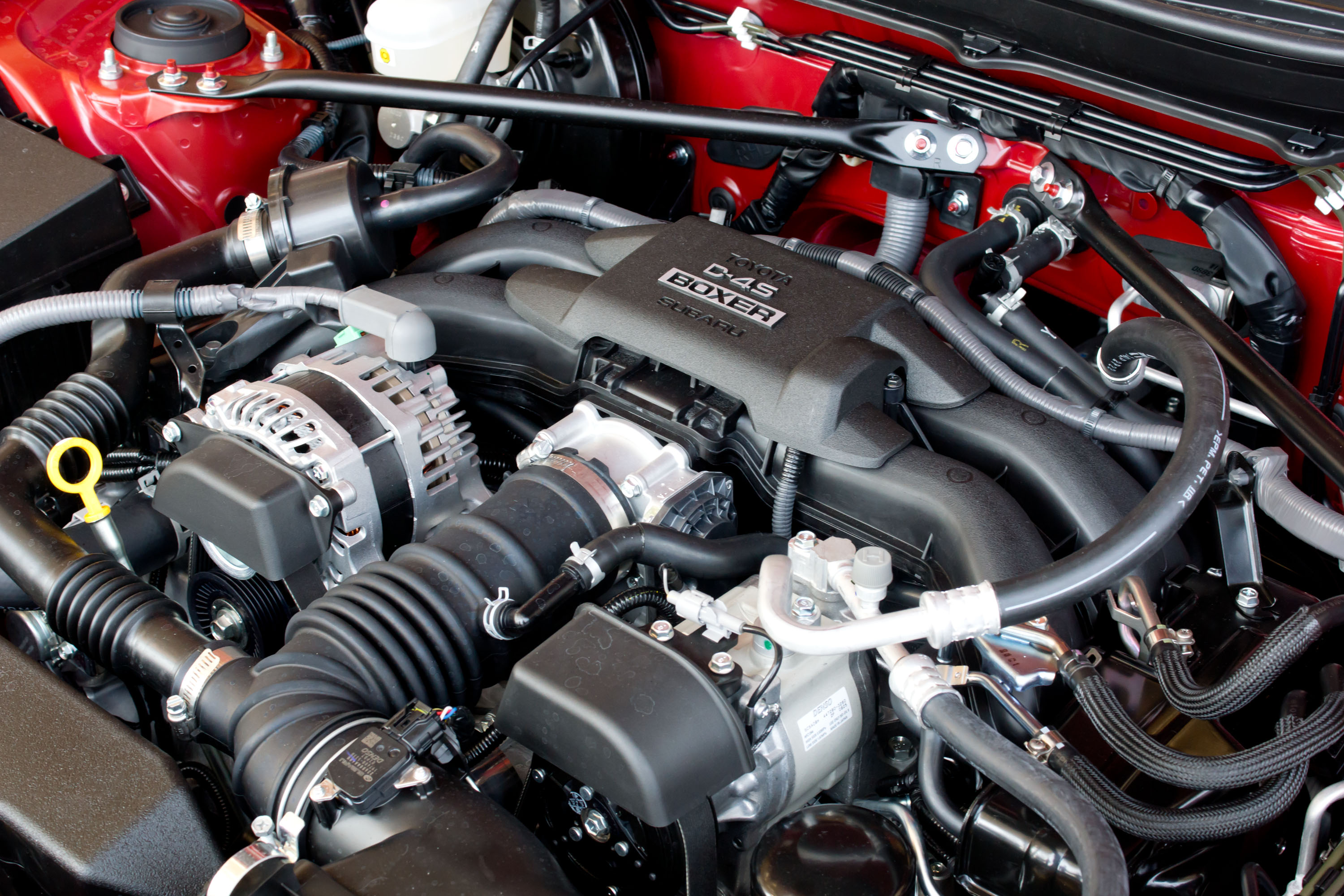
The Subaru FA20/Toyota 4U-GSE engine, marketed as the D-4S Boxer, was named one of Ward's 10 Best Engines in 2013

In Europe, the GT86 was awarded the following titles in 2012:

- Car of the Year by Top Gear magazine (and Jeremy Clarkson) who also crowned it Coupé of the Year and winner of the Top Gear Speed Week (against competition including the McLaren MP4-12C, Porsche 911 Carrera S, and Lotus Exige S);
- Best Driver's Car by Autocar;
- Performance Car by Auto Express.

In Australia, the 86 was awarded the following titles in 2012:

- Car of the Year award by Wheels magazine, CarsGuide, and Drive (shared with Subaru BRZ);
- Best Performance Car under A$60,000 and People's Choice again by Drive;
- People's Choice Best Performance Car under A$100,000 by Carsales (shared with Subaru BRZ).

Other awards received include:

- 2012 Car of the Year in New Zealand (Toyota 86 and GT86);
- 2012 Best Affordable Sports Car by US News (Scion FR-S);
- 2012 Insurance Institute for Highway Safety Top Safety Pick in the US (Scion FR-S and Subaru BRZ);
- 2013 10Best List by the American Car and Driver (Scion FR-S and Subaru BRZ);
- 2012–2013 Japan Car of the Year "Special Award" (Toyota 86 and Subaru BRZ).

The Subaru BRZ was also crowned:

- Fun-est Car of the Year by Top Gear Australia (against the Toyota 86, BMW M135i, Porsche 911 Carrera, Audi RS5, Ford Focus ST, and Renault Megane RS265);
- 2012 Sports Car of the Year by France's Échappement;
- 2013 Best Sports Car by Canada's Auto123.

In addition, the Toyota-Subaru D-4S boxer engine was named one of Ward's 10 Best Engines in 2013.

== Motorsport ==
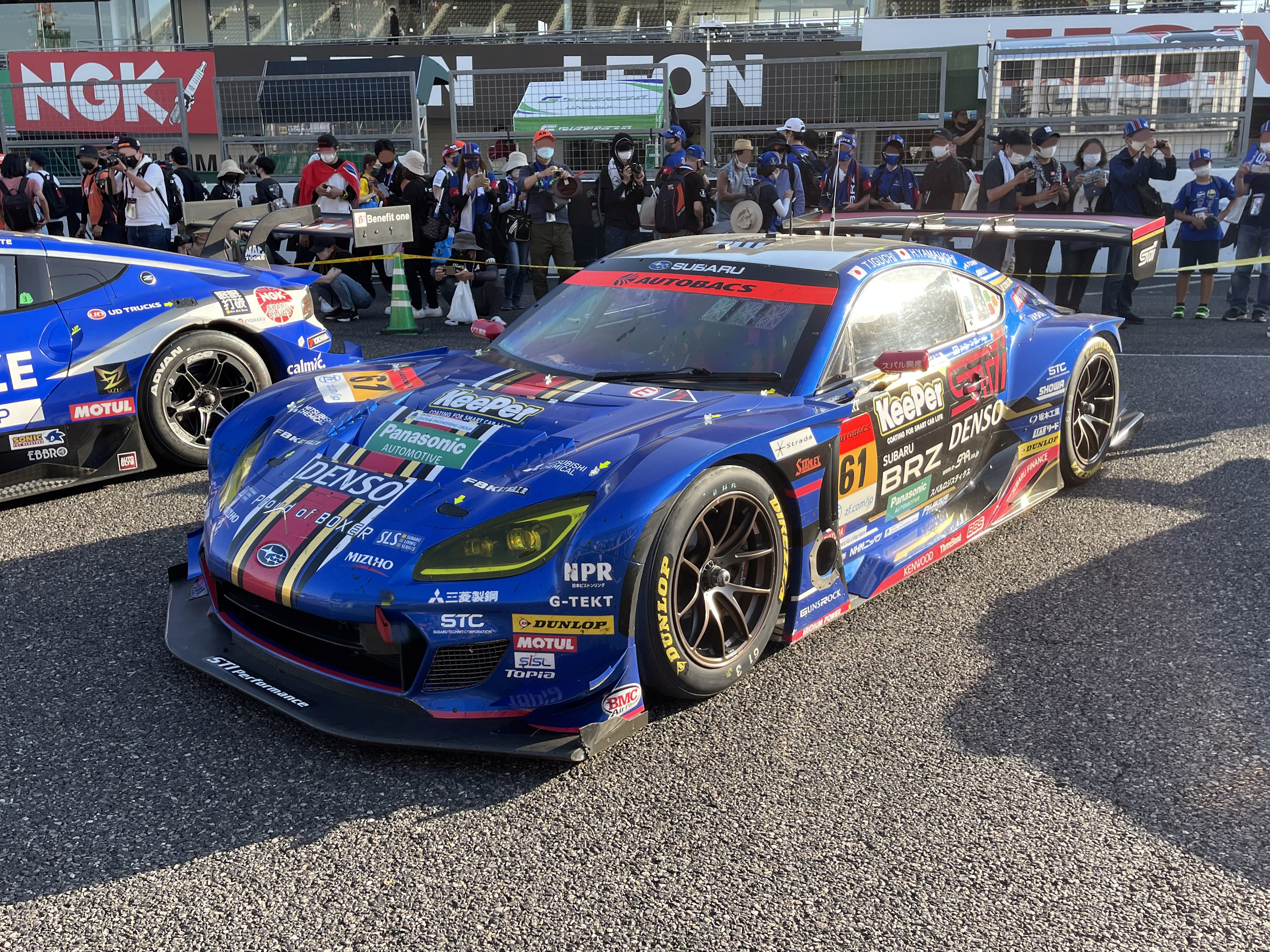
R&D Sport's Subaru BRZ currently competes in the GT300 class of the Super GT Series.

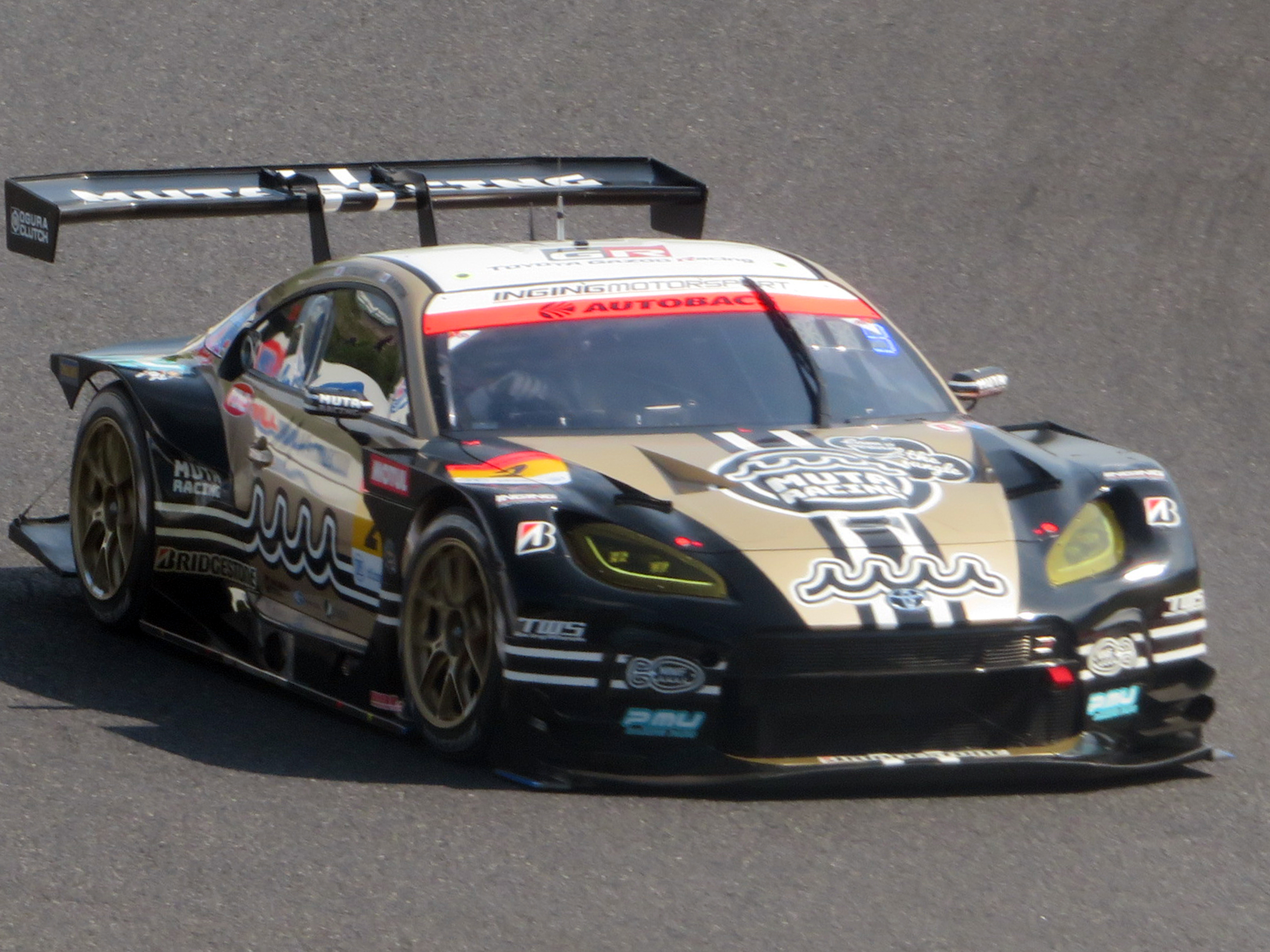
muta Racing's Toyota GR86 silhouette currently competes in the Super GT Series.

=== Super GT ===
In 2011 Subaru unveiled the Super BRZ Concept STi and their latest entry in the Super GT series GT300-category. R&D Sport developed the BRZ GT300 to replace their Legacy for the 2012 season using the EJ20 engine.

The Toyota 86 MC also competes in the GT300, but unlike the BRZ GT300 it is based on a standard Super GT Dome-produced "mother chassis" and GT Association-branded Nissan V8 engine. Only the name and body style are shared with the production car. In 2016 VivaC team Tsuchiya's 86 MC won the GT300 driver and team championships, with Takeshi Tsuchiya and Takamitsu Matsui at the wheel.

In 2021, Subaru unveiled the new BRZ GT300 based on the second-generation BRZ, followed by Toyota unveiling the new GR86 GT300 in 2022. They were built around the road car instead of a predefined mother chassis, with advanced aerodynamics and a lightweight body. The BRZ GT300 is powered by an updated version of the same EJ20 turbocharged flat-four racing engine as its predecessor. The GR86 GT300 is powered by a naturally-aspirated TRD 5.4 litre 2UR-GSE racing engine and features a Hewland six-speed sequential transmission. The Toyota GR86 GT300 is 50 kg (110 lb) lighter, with a shorter wheelbase and overall length compared to the Subaru BRZ GT300.

In its first year of competition, the new second-generation BRZ GT300 won the GT300 class of the 2021 Super GT Championship, driven by Takuto Iguchi and Hideki Yamauchi for R&D Sport.

=== Formula Drift ===
In the United States Ken Gushi used a GPP Scion Racing FR-S built by GReddy Racing for the US Formula Drift championship. The FR-S features a turbocharged EJ25 boxer engine from a Subaru WRX STI producing more than 450 kW (600 bhp). Ryan Tuerck drove a Scion FR-S powered by a stroked 2JZ-GTE producing more than 520 kW (700 bhp) for Retaks Backpacks and Maxxis Tires in the 2013 US Formula Drift championship.

=== D1 Grand Prix ===
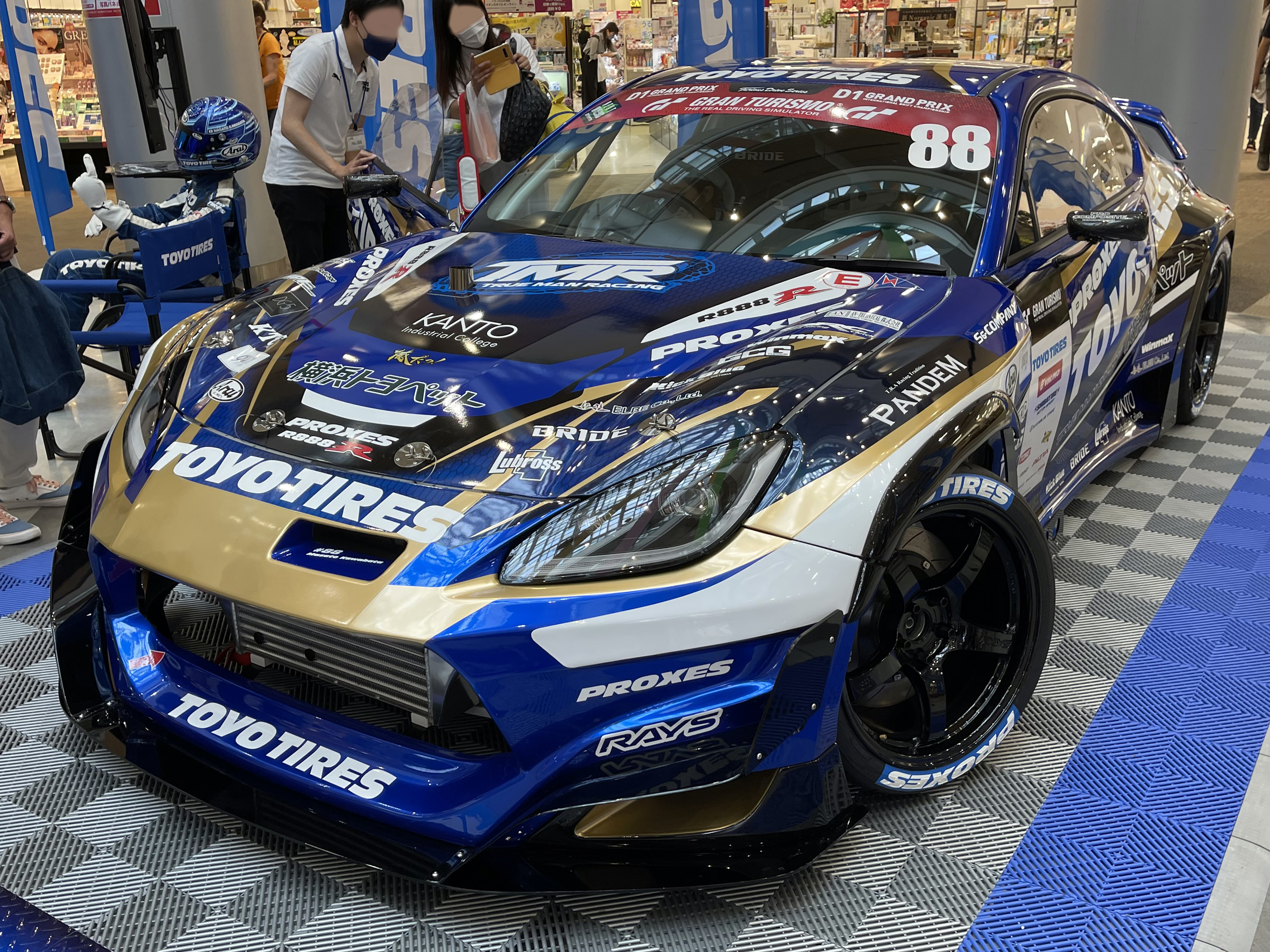
Team Toyo Tires Drift's Toyota GR86 for D1 Grand Prix

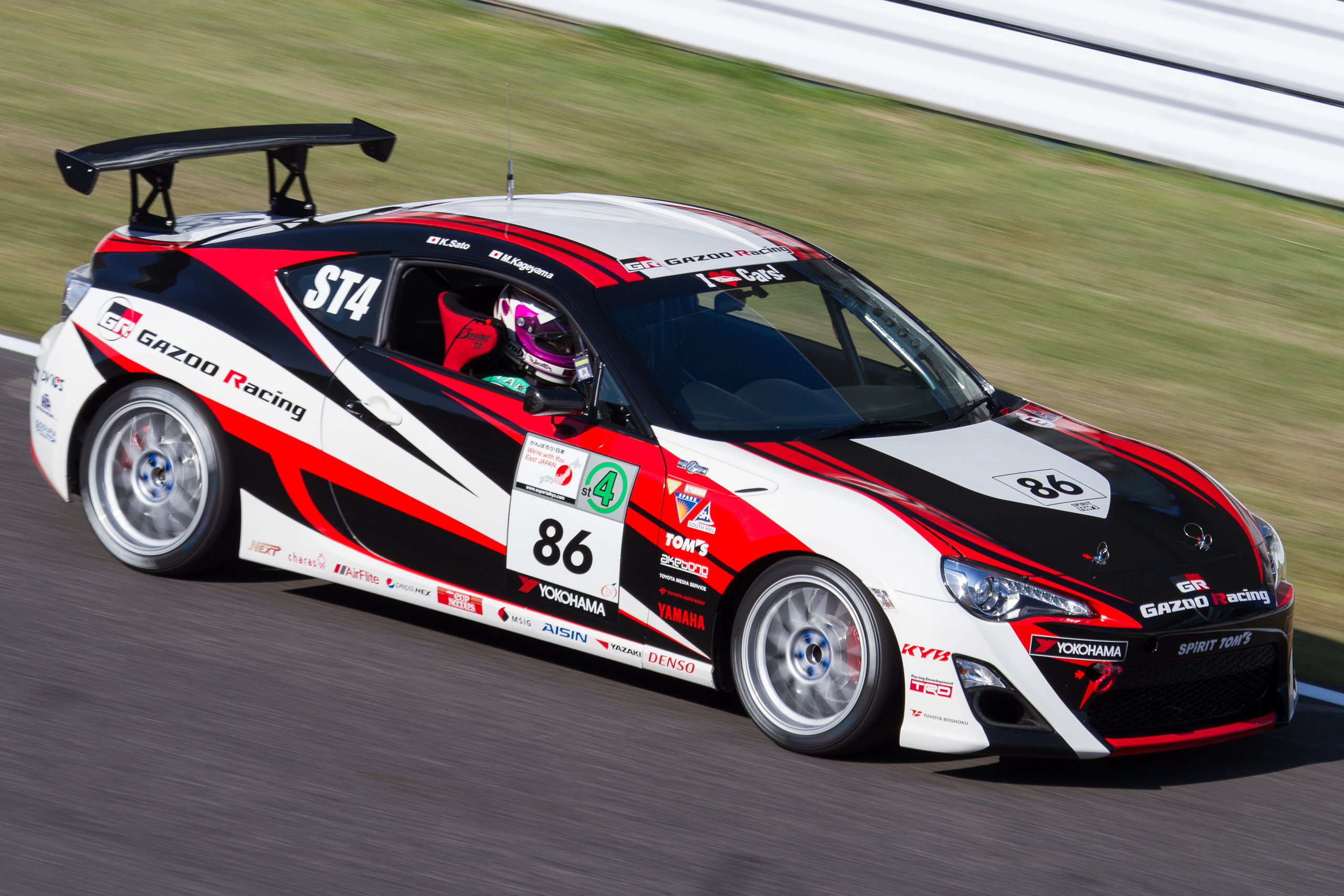
Gazoo Racing's Toyota 86 competing in the Super Taikyu Endurance Series

For 2012 season, HKS, Droo-P and Max Orido debuted their car for 2012 competition followed by Blitz in round 3 and OTG Motorsport in 2014. the first win for the chassis came at the 2013 season with Tetsuya Hibino behind the wheel of the Droo-P built 86. Manabu Orido also achieved victory with his car at 2015 season after facing Yoichi Imamura also in 86 making it the only all GT86 final in D1GP with both cars powered by V8 engines.

In 2022, Team Toyo Tires debut the new GR86 built by Wisteria. On its debut season the car win the overall round twice with Masato Kawabata behind the wheel on both occasions, Kawabata finished the season as runner-up and taking the Solo run championship making the GR86 one of the most successful seasons for a new chassis. Hideyuki Fujino drove the sister car to win the overall title in 2023 and 2025 with the latter season finished with an all-GR86 top three in overall standings.

=== 86 Racing / BRZ RA Racing ===
In October 2012 Toyota Racing Development and Gazoo Racing introduced a production racing model based on the 86. The 86 Racing adds brake and oil cooler modifications, as well as a 4-point racing harness and rollcage. The stock alloy wheels are replaced by steel wheels, while the exterior colour was only available in white. Subaru followed in early 2013 with the BRZ RA Racing, featuring similar modifications. Both cars are only available in the Japanese market, and are eligible for a one-make racing series run by Gazoo Racing. Unlike the Toyota, the BRZ RA Racing is available in any of the production car's colours.

In 2013, the FR-S replaced the Scion tC for the Toyota Pro/Celebrity Race at the Grand Prix of Long Beach.

The Series was replaced in 2022 by the Toyota Gazoo Racing GR86/BRZ Cup.

=== Toyota Gazoo Racing GR86/BRZ Cup ===
From 2022, Toyota Gazoo Racing organised an 86/BRZ-Spec championship across Japan called the Toyota Gazoo Racing GR86/BRZ Cup. The series was based on (and succeeded) the TGR 86/BRZ Racing, that consisted of races on single circuits instead of a National Series, akin to the NASCAR Weekly Series.

=== Toyota 86 Racing Series ===
The Toyota 86 Racing Series has been contested in Australia annually since 2016. It was initially announced as the 86 Pro-Am Series.

=== Sports Car Club of America ===
For 2018 onwards, the Sports Car Club of America (SCCA) created the "Solo Spec Coupe" (SSC) class for autocross competitions using the 2013–2016 Subaru BRZ or Scion FR-S, competing on Falken Azenis RT615K+ tyres. The choice of vehicle was because of its popularity with enthusiasts, modest price, rear-wheel drive, and its ability to be used as a daily driver. Vehicles may compete with original equipment or install specified performance parts including factory-sealed KONI Sport Shocks, Eibach Pro-Plus springs, anti-roll bars, and an SPC Front Alignment Kit.

In 2020, the tyre specification was changed to the Falken Azenis RT660. In 2025, it was changed to the Falken Azenis RT660+, and subsequently the Bridgestone Potenza RE-71RZ for 2027.

=== Time Attack ===
In the US, the 86CUP one-chassis time attack series was created in 2013. The series sees hundreds of drivers compete every year split among regional divisions in Southern California, Northern California, Midwest and North East. Since 2022, the competition allows mixed use of 2012–2020 86 models as well as the new 2022+ models with the 2.4L engine, using a handicap system to level the playing field between generations.

Nobuhiro Tajima entered a 86 to compete at the 2013 Pikes Peak Hill Climb, but only used the production car silhouette.

=== Miscellaneous ===
Toyota worked in partnership with Gazoo Racing to develop the 86 for motorsports, with both supporting private teams in the Super Taikyu Endurance Series and All-Japan Rally Championship. Gazoo Racing entered cars in the 24 Hours Nürburgring, winning the SP3 class in 2012. Privateers Toyota Swiss Racing also claimed the V3 category in the same year. UK-based GPRM developed a turbocharged version for classification in the European SRO Group GT4 category, without formal factory backing but "with the blessing of Toyota Great Britain." Race engine development work on the 2.0l boxer unit was carried out by Nicholson McLaren Engines. The car ran practice sessions at 2013 British GT round 3 at Silverstone but withdrew during FP2 when the car dropped oil. In 2014 the car ran four rounds in the Invitational category; starting 2015 in the same category but running as a full entry from R3 onwards.

=== Rally ===
In Europe, there was also rally tuned, production based model. Developed by Toyota Motorsport GmbH (TMG), the rear-wheel-drive GT86 CS-R3 built a presence for privateer and regional customer racing in the R3 rally category

While having success in the R3 category, the car notably achieved an outright victory in the 2016 British Rally Championship at the 2016 National A Ulster Rally.

Other production based 86/BRZ racecars have achieved success in rallying. In 2023 Lia Block and Rhiannon Gelsomino won the 2023 ARA Open 2WD rally championship in a rally tuned ZC6 Subaru BRZ winning 4 rallies and one second place on their way to the title.

== Sales ==
Calendar year	Toyota GT-86/86 (Scion FR-S)					Subaru BRZ		
Calendar year	Japan	US	Canada	Australia	UK	Japan	US	Canada
2012	22,510	11,417	1,470	2,047	1,438	4,831	4,144	504
2013	12,400	18,327	1,825	6,706	1,777	4,784	8,587	1,119
2014	8,190	14,062	1,559	4,257	1,046	2,826	7,504	922
2015	6,690	10,507	1,329	3,006	777	2,043	5,296	800
2016	6,570	7,457 (Note: Includes FR-S sales)	988	2,068	684	2,096	4,141	740
2017	7,170	6,846	919	1,619	669	2,097	4,146	787
2018	4,950	4,146	550		479	1,635	3,834	604
2019	4,630	3,398	262		349	1,291	2,334	647
2020	3,940	2,476	234		260	998	2,267	692
2021	1,620	1,152	75			6	2,320	438
2022	13,341	11,996	537				3,345	
2023	9,796	11,078					4,188	
2024		11,426					3,345	
2025		9,940					2,882	

== See also ==
- List of Subaru vehicles
- List of Toyota vehicles
