= Mount Kanmuri (Kanagawa) =

Mountain in the country of Japan

Coordinates: 35°14′07″N 139°01′13″E

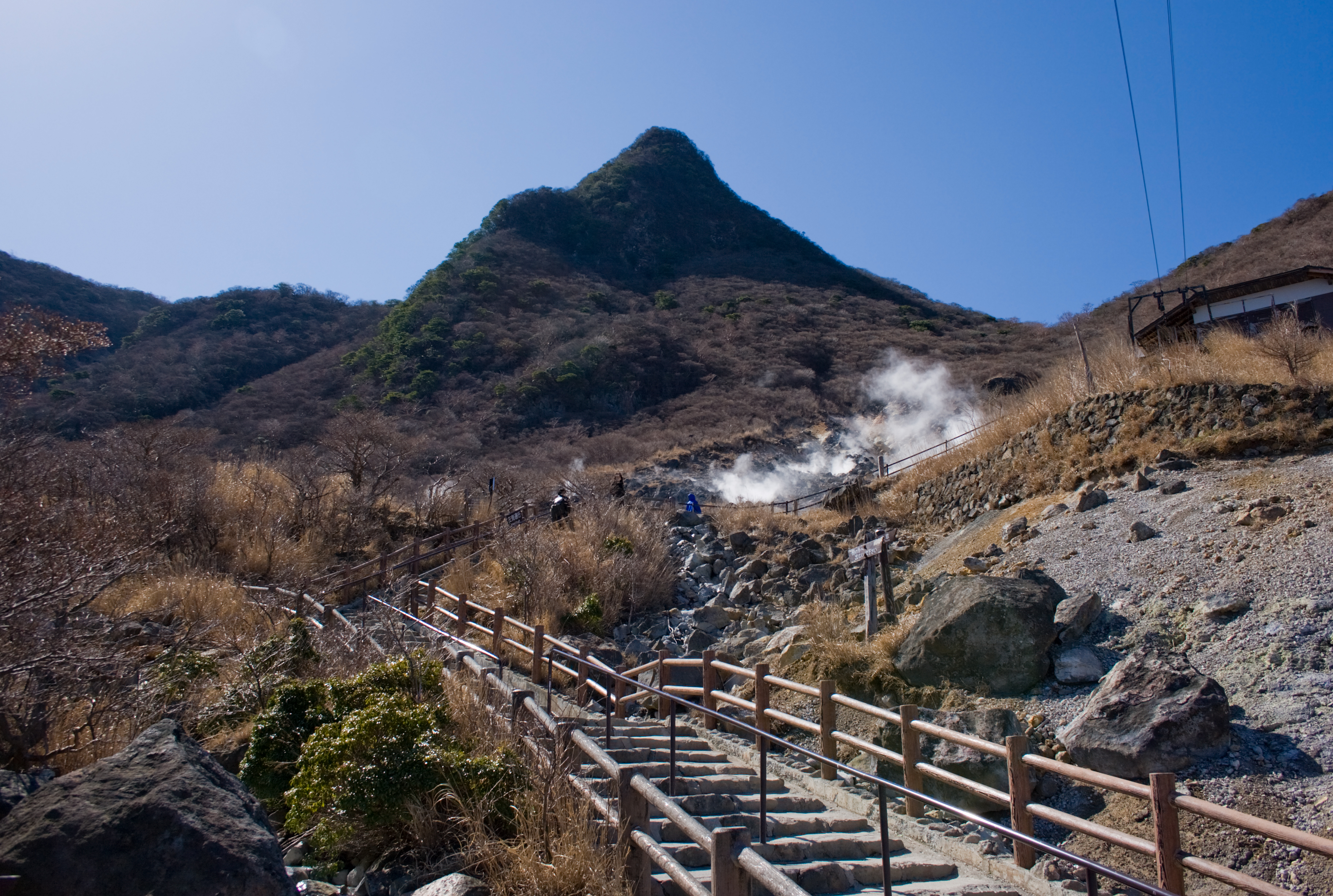
Mount Kanmuri viewed from Ōwakudani

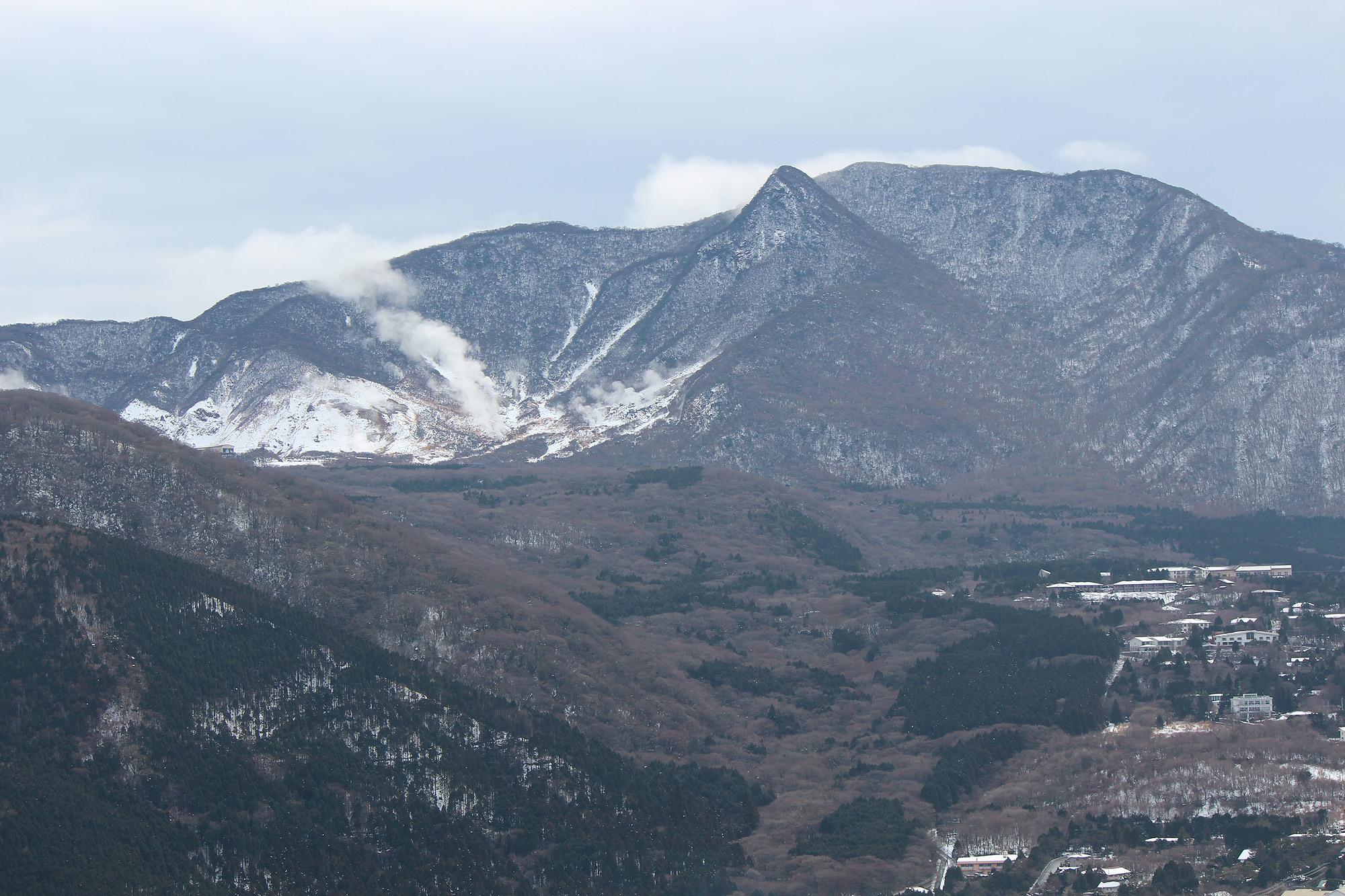
Mounts Kami and Kanmuri, with Owakudani before them on left, viewed from the Nagao Pass (長尾峠)

Mount Kanmuri (Japanese: 冠ヶ岳 = Kanmuri-ga-Take, meaning the "mountain with a Kanmuri hat") is one of the peaks of Mount Hakone, in Hakone, Kanagawa, Japan, with an elevation of 1,409m meters. When the phreatic eruptions occurred on the northwestern slope of Mount Kami about 2,900 years ago, the underground magma created a lava dome, which is the current Mount Kanmuri. These eruptions caused the damming of the Haya River, creating the Sengokuhara and Lake Ashi.

This mountain looks like the "Kanmuri" headwear, which used to be worn by the noble men in ancient Japan.

== Climbing Mount Kanmuri ==
Climbing mountains is a popular sport in the Mount Hakone area. To the top of Mount Kanmuri, there are three trails: from Mount Koma Summit Station of the Hakone Komagatake Ropeway, from Sōunzan Station of Hakone Tozan Cable Car, and from Ōwakudani Station of the Hakone Ropeway. The trail from Ōwakudani gets closed when too much volcanic vapor is evident. .

== See also ==
- Fuji-Hakone-Izu National Park
