= Hakone Resort Complex =

Resort complex in Japan

Coordinates: 35°12′50″N 139°0′30″E

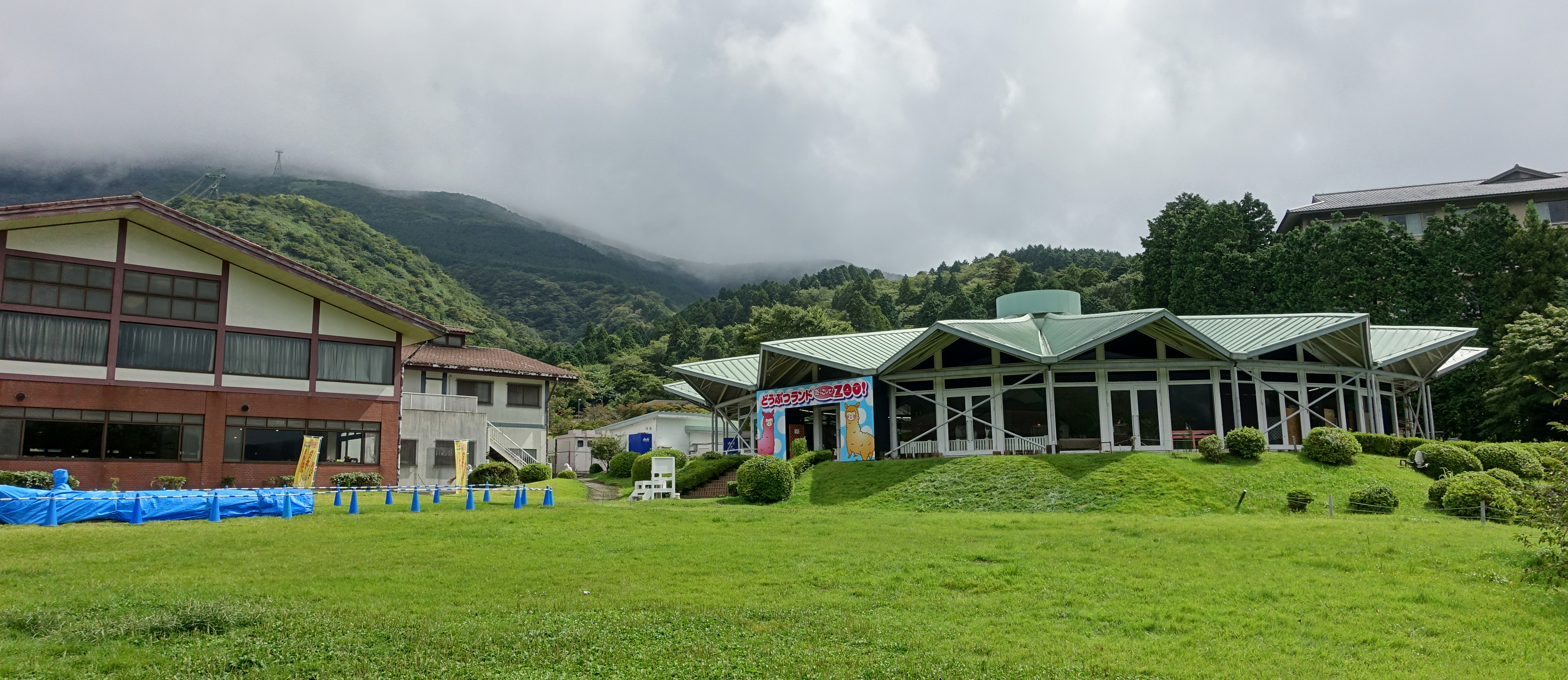
Hakone Resort Complex

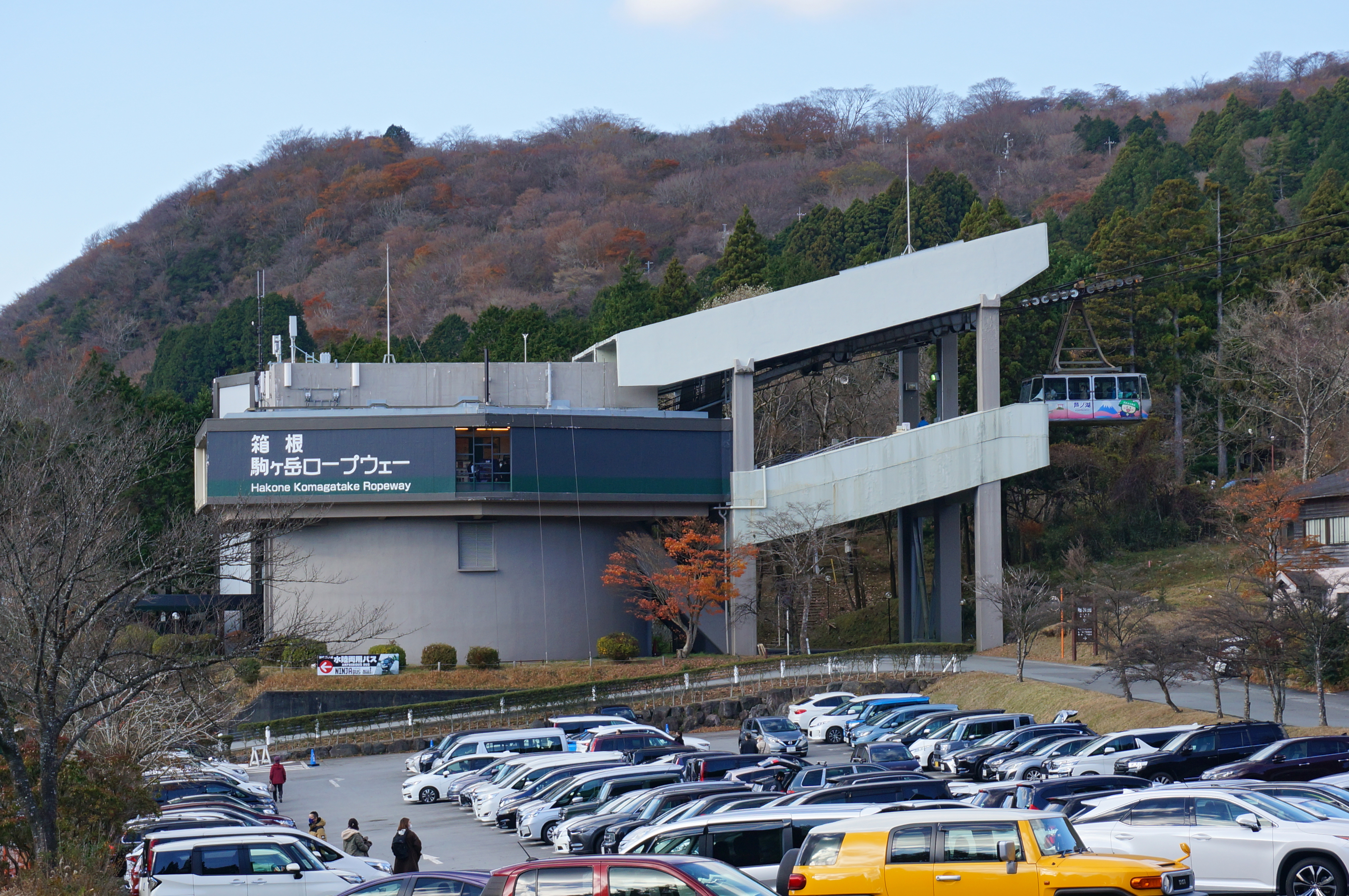
Hakone Komagatake Ropeway Station in the Hakone Resort Complex

The Hakone Resort Complex or Hakone-en (Japanese:箱根園, meaning the "Hakone Garden") is a resort complex located on the east side of Lake Ashi, along Kanagawa Prefectural Route 75 in Motohakone, Hakone-machi, Ashigarashimo-gun, Kanagawa Prefecture. It is run by Prince Hotels & Resorts (until March 2006, Kokudo and Seibu Railway). It consists of cottages, a botanical garden, an aquarium, a shopping mall, a ropeway to Mount Koma, and a pier of the sightseeing ships on Lake Ashi.

The Hakone Resort Complex has been the base of the Seibu Group, including Izuhakone Railway, in the so-called Hakone Mountain Battles (箱根山戦争|) with the Odakyu Group. Together with related facilities, it has been formed as one of the premier attractions in Hakone and Lake Ashi. On fine days Mount Fuji can be seen from Hakone-en's lake shores.

== See also ==
- Fuji-Hakone National Park
- Mount Hakone
- Lake Ashi
