= Futagoyama =

Futagoyama may refer to:

- Futagoyama stable (1962–2004), a stable of sumo wrestlers from 1962 until 2004
  - Wakanohana Kanji I (1928–2010), sumo wrestler and head of Futagoyama stable until 1993
  - Takanohana Kenshi (1950–2005), sumo wrestler and head of Futagoyama stable until 2004
- Futagoyama stable (2018), a stable of sumo wrestlers established in 2018
  - Miyabiyama Tetsushi (1977–), sumo wrestler and head of the new Futagoyama stable

== See also ==
- Futago-Yama, a twin-peak mountain in the central volcanic cones of Mount Hakone, located in Hakone, Kanagawa, Japan
