= Mount Kami =

Mount Kami may refer to:

- Mount Kami (Hakone)
- Mount Kami (Okayama)
