= Kashiya Cave Tombs =

Archaeological site in Kannami, Tōkai, Japan

- 柏谷横穴群 (Japanese)
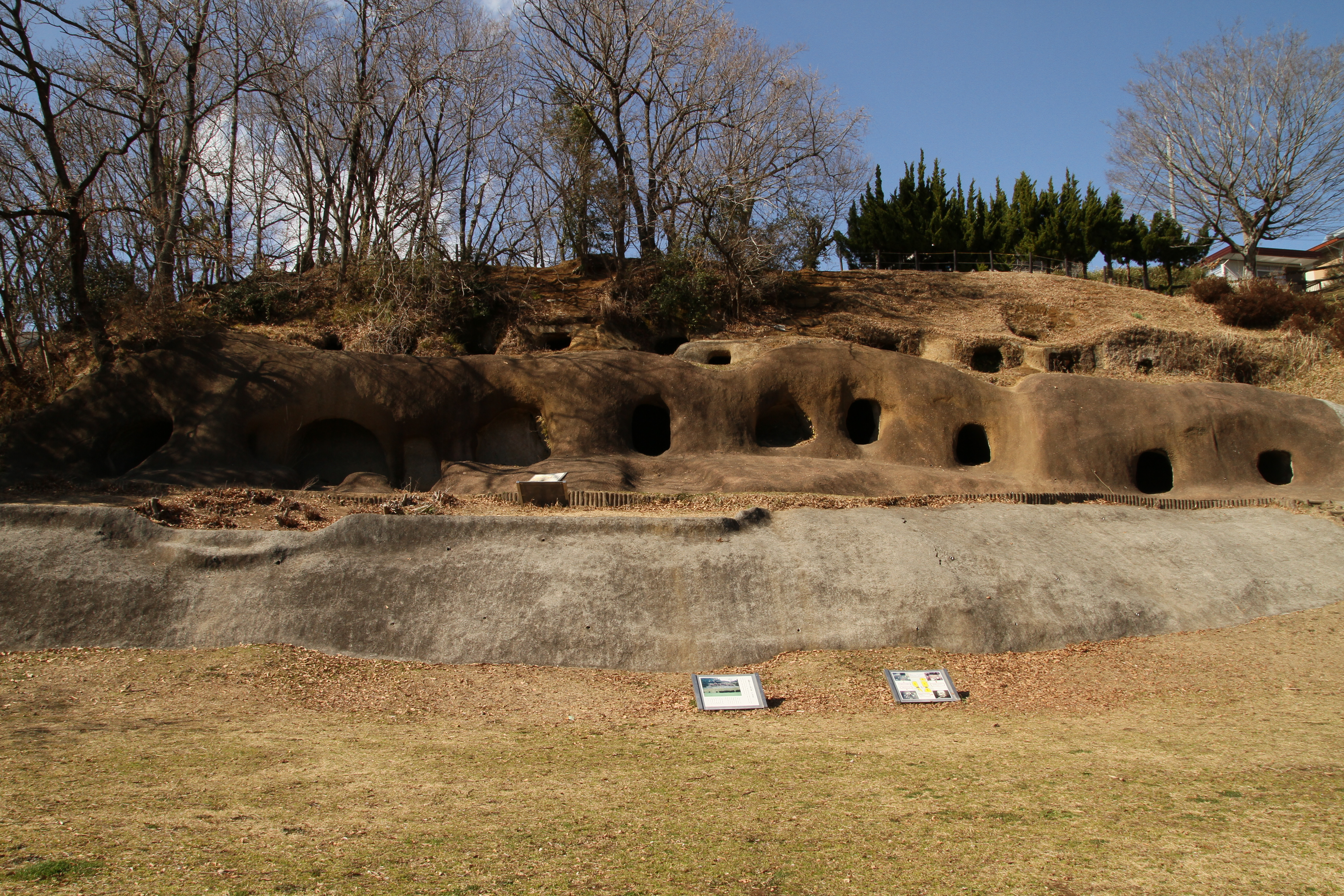
- Kashiya Yokoana-kofun

- Kashiya Yokoana-kofun Kashiya Cave Tombs (Japan)
- 35°04′58″N 138°57′34″E
- Type: Yokoanabo
- Periods: Kofun period
- Location: Kannami, Shizuoka, Japan
- Region: Tōkai region

Site notes
- Public access: Yes

The Kashiya Cave Tombs (柏谷横穴群, Kashiya Yokoana-kofun gun) is an archaeological site containing the ruins of a final Kofun period to early Nara period necropolis in the Kashiya neighborhood of the town of Kannami, Shizuoka, in the Tōkai region of Japan. The site was designated a National Historic Site of Japan in 1976, with the area under protection extended in 1998. The site is also popularly known as the Kashiya One Hundred Holes (柏谷の百穴, Kashiya no Hyakuketsu).

== Overview ==
The Kashiya site is the largest collection of yokoanabo in Shizuoka Prefecture, and it is located on the eastern side of the Tagata Plain in the Kano River basin at the northern end of the Izu Peninsula. The tombs are located on a steep hill and are dug into the tuff layer in four to five layers. Some of the upper-level tombs are heavily weathered, and some of the lowest-level tombs are buried. The tombs have rectangular, sometimes square, openings with vaulted ceilings averaging 1.5 meters high, and they are between two and three meters deep. The passages are filled with river stones.

The site consisted of between 300 and 500 tombs in a 600-by-250-meter area at an elevation of 20 to 30 meters, orientated south, east or west, facing the Tagata Plains, Mount Fuji, or Mount Hakone. Per a study by Nippon University in 1947, the tombs can be divided into five distinct groups based on location and design, which were labelled "A" through "E".

The site has been known since at least the Meiji period; however, most of groups "A", "D" and "E" have been destroyed by property development and modern housing. The preserved area consists of groups "B" and C" with approximately 116 tombs. As a result of the Kannami Town Board of Education survey in 1997, an additional 17 unopened tombs were discovered, leading to the possibility that more may exist both within and without the protected area.

Grave goods recovered from the tombs include shards of Haji ware and Sue ware earthenware; gold, copper and stone jewelry (including magatama and cylindrical beads); weapons; and horse fittings. One of the finds was a tortoise plastron used as an oracle bone for divination purposes. The graves are thought to have been created from the end of the 6th century to the end of the 8th century, and cremated human bones have also been found in the more recent graves, indicating a period of transition between burial and cremation.

== Gallery ==
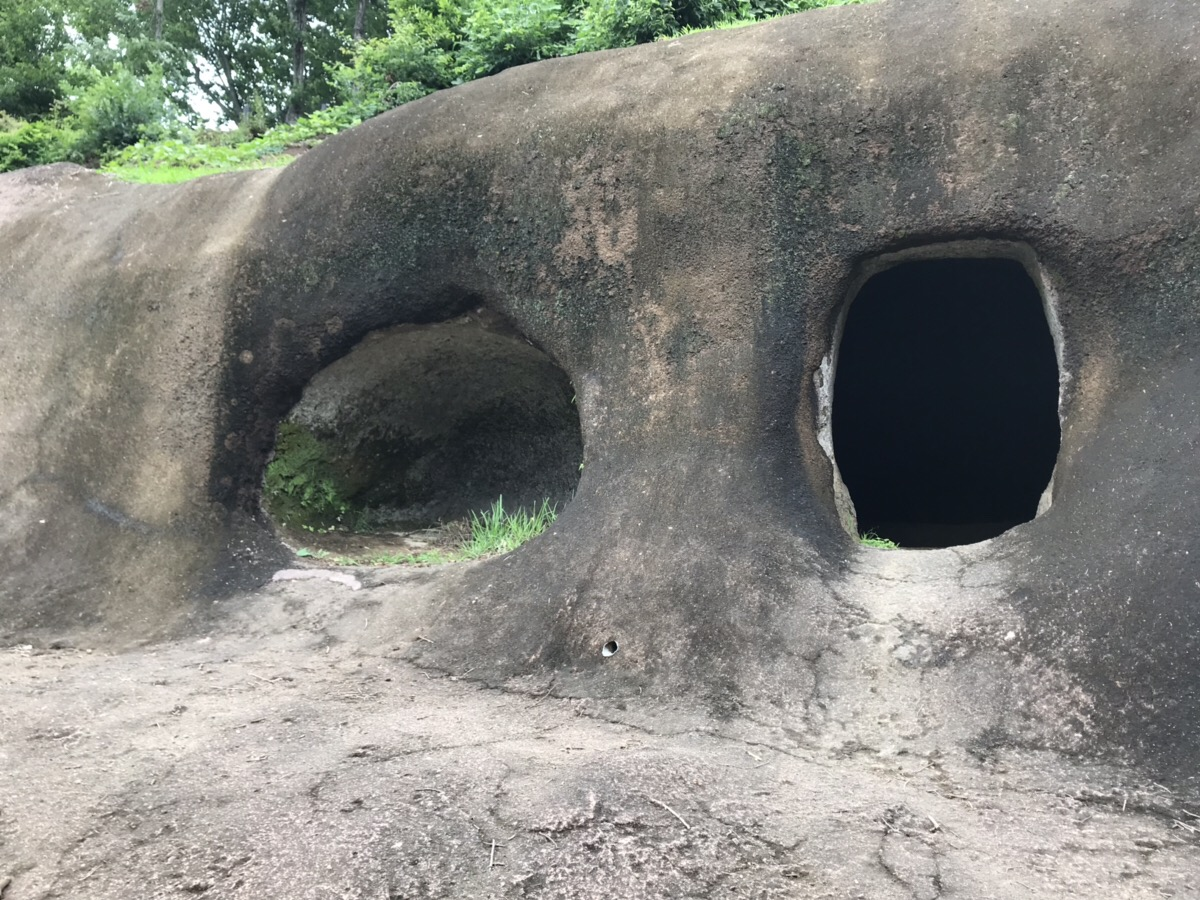
Restored cave-tombs

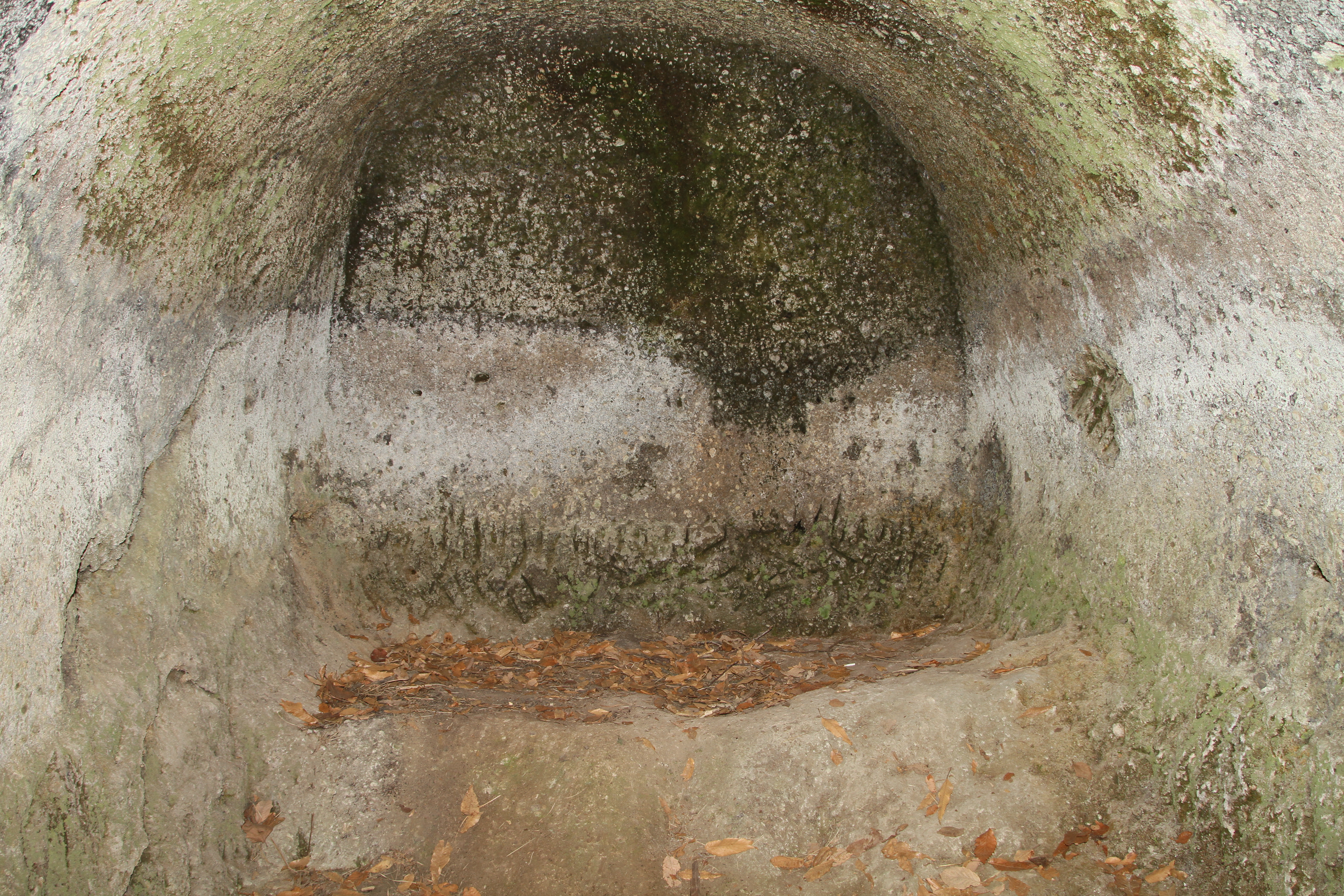
Interior of cave-tomb

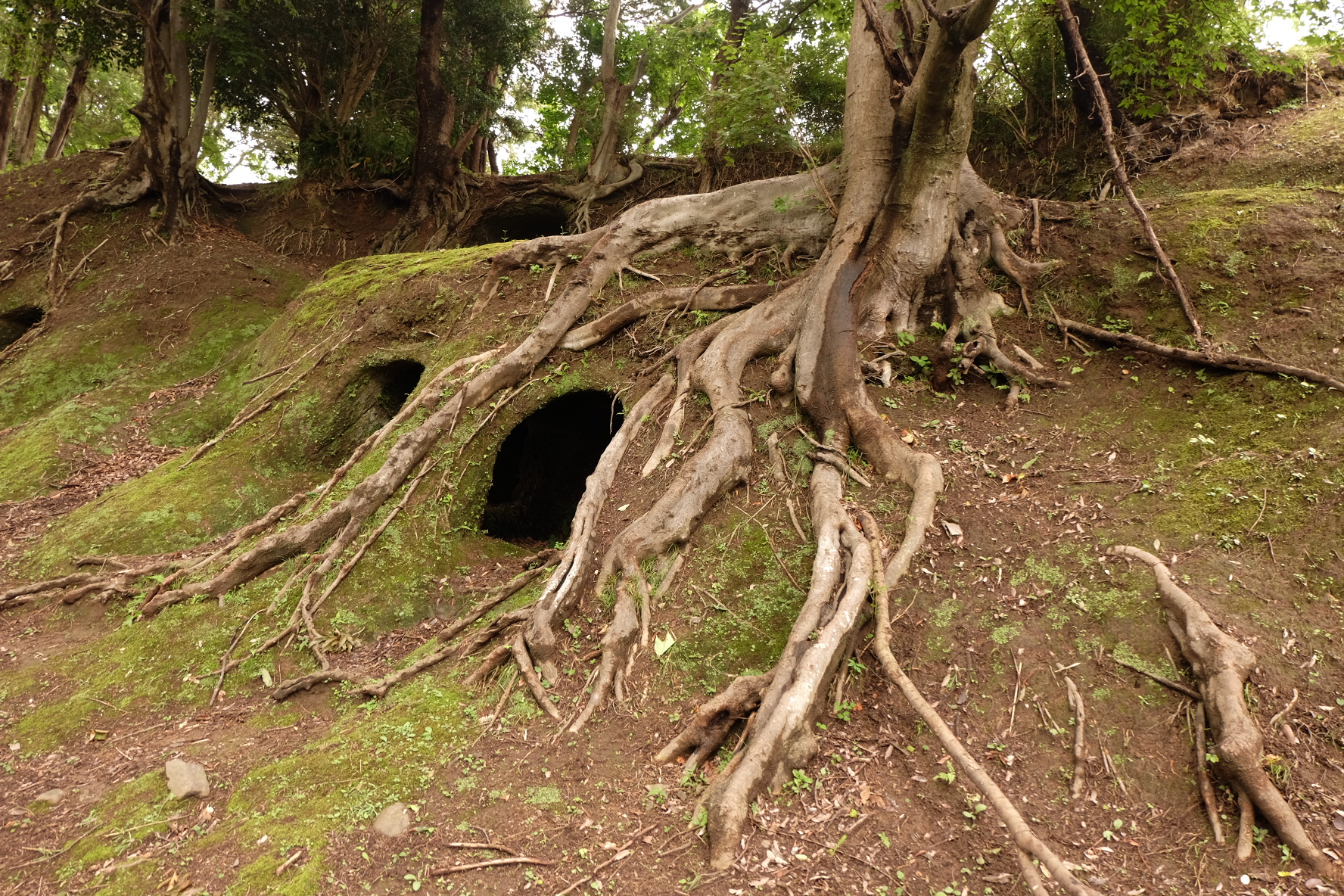
Cave-tomb in unrestored state

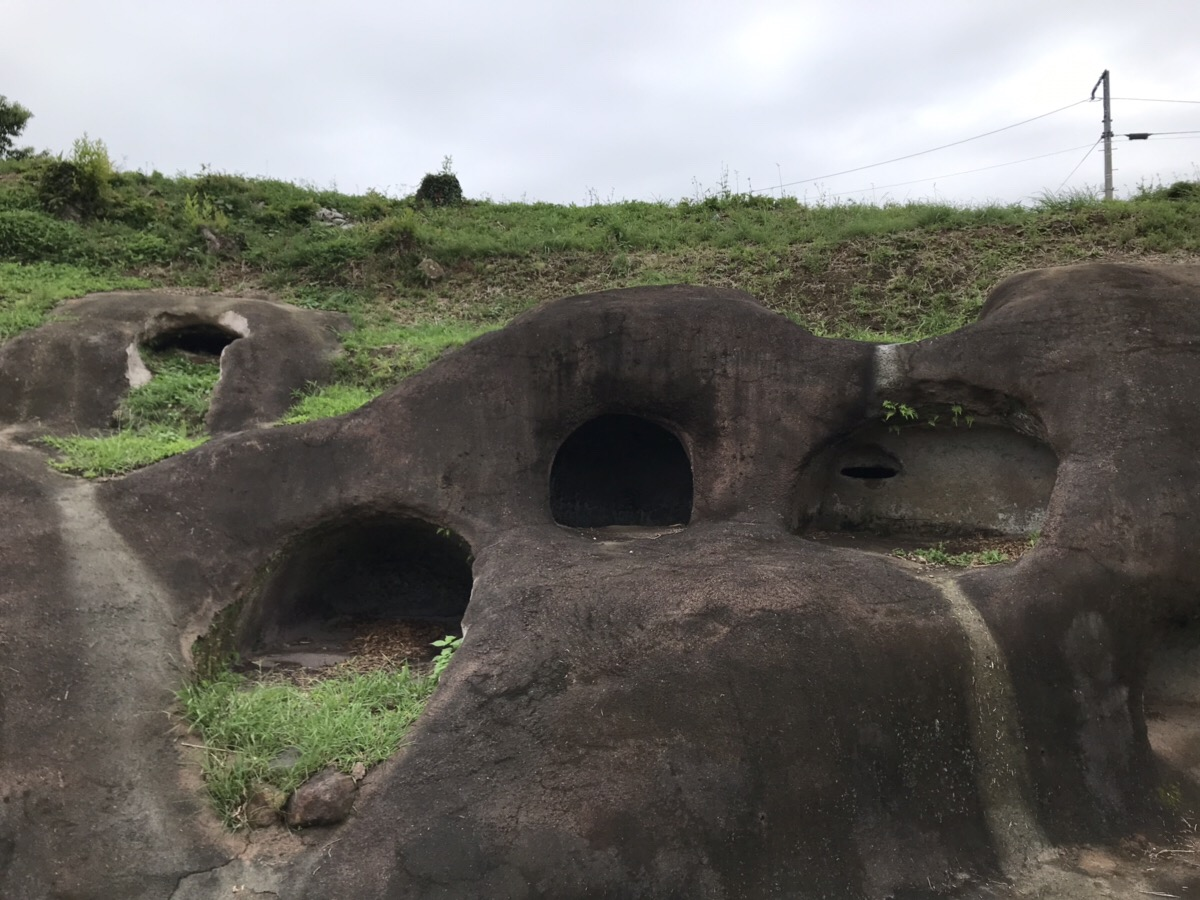
Region named a National Historic Site in 1998

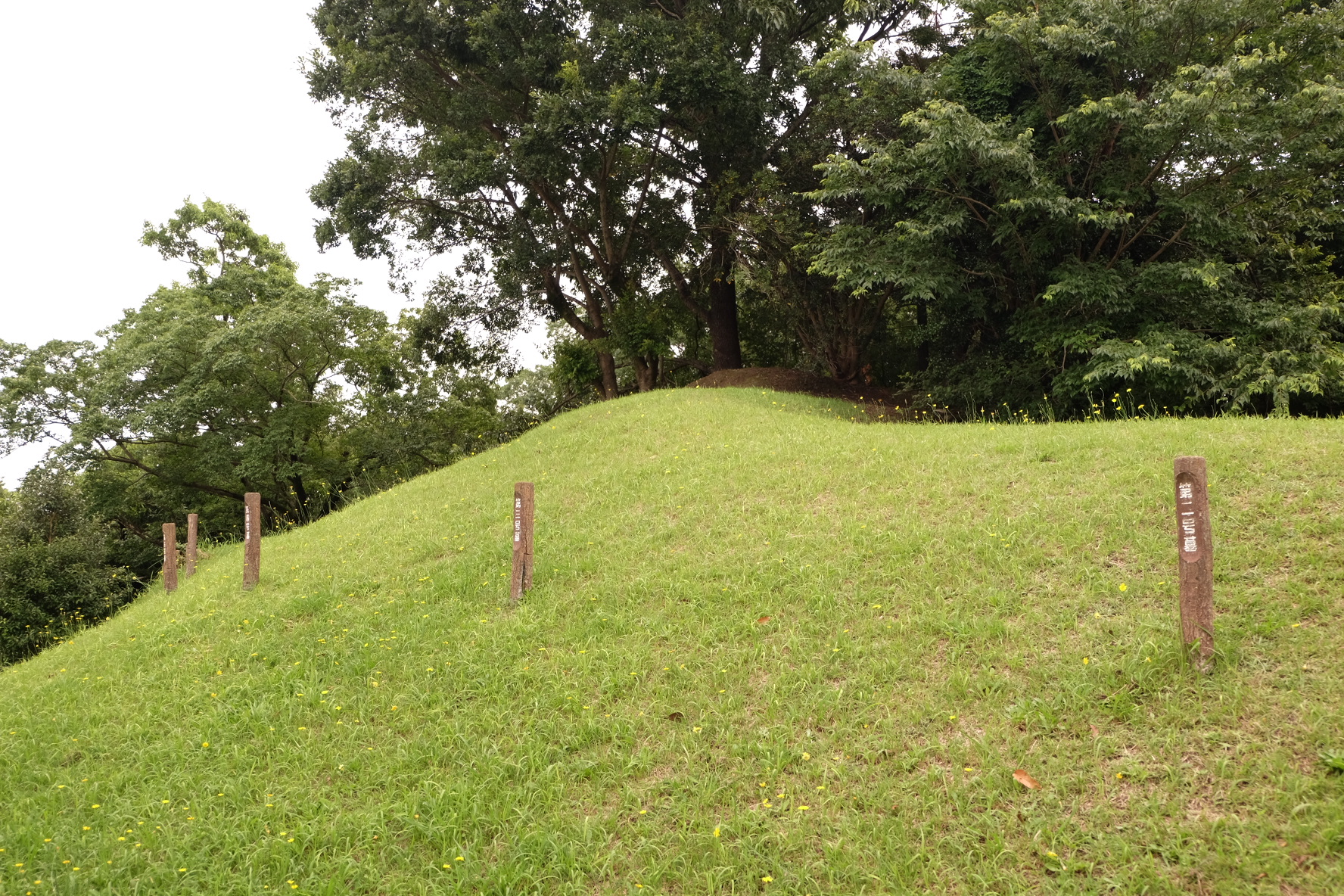
Backfilled grave-tombs for preservation

== See also ==
- List of Historic Sites of Japan (Shizuoka)
