= List of years in sumo =

The following is a list of "year in sumo" articles in chronological order, each providing an extensive overview of notable events in professional sumo for any given calendar year. The summaries next to each entry have been gleaned from their corresponding articles and concern only top division championships (makuuchi yūshō), as well as a selected few extraordinary occurrences.

== 1970s ==
- 1970 in sumo - Kitanofuji and Tamanoumi II vie for dominance with 3 and 2 yusho respectively, while Taihō manages just one. Kitanofuji and Tamanoumi are promoted to Yokozuna.
- 1971 in sumo - Kitanofuji and Tamanoumi II again vie for dominance with 3 and 2 yusho respectively, while an ageing Taihō wins his last title and retires. Tamanoumi dies suddenly in October after a delayed appendectomy.
- 1972 in sumo - There is a different winner for each basho with Hasegawa, Kitanofuji, Kotozakura, Takamiyama, Tochiazuma I, and Wajima winning one yusho a piece. Takamiyama becomes first foreign born top division champion.
- 1973 in sumo - Wajima wins 3, Kotozakura wins 2, and Kitanofuji wins his last yusho. Kotozakura and Wajima are promoted to Yokozuna.
- 1974 in sumo - Wajima wins 3 yusho while Kitanoumi takes his first 2, Kaiketsu wins his first title. Kitanoumi promoted to Yokozuna. Both Kitanofuji and Kotozakura retire.
- 1975 in sumo - Kitanoumi and Takanohana I take 2 yusho, while Mienoumi and Kongo both take their first.
- 1976 in sumo - Kitanoumi and Wajima vie for dominance with 3 and 2 yusho respectively, Kaiketsu wins his second and last yusho.
- 1977 in sumo - Wajima and Kitanoumi again vie for dominance with 3 and 2 yusho respectively, Wakamisugi II* wins his first Championship.
- 1978 in sumo - Kitanoumi dominates with 5 yusho, with Wakanohana II taking the other. Wakanohana II is promoted to Yokozuna.
- 1979 in sumo - Kitanoumi wins three tournaments, Mienoumi, Wajima, and Wakanohana II win the other three. Mienoumi is promoted to Yokozuna.

*Wakamisugi II would later become Wakanohana II

== 1980s ==
- 1980 in sumo - Kitanoumi wins 3 titles, Mienoumi, Wakanohana II, and Wajima win their last titles. Mienoumi retires.
- 1981 in sumo - Chiyonofuji and Kitanoumi vie for dominance at three and two championships respectively, Kotokaze gets first tournament win. Chiyonofuji promoted to Yokozuna. Wajima retires.
- 1982 in sumo - Chiyonofuji dominates winning 4 yusho, Kitanoumi and Takanosato win the other two.
- 1983 in sumo - Both Chiyonofuji and Takanosato win 2 yusho, with Kotokaze and Hokuten'yū winning the other two. Takanosato is promoted to Yokozuna. Wakanohana II retires.
- 1984 in sumo - Wakashimazu takes home his 1st and 2nd yusho, Kitanoumi wins his 24th and final yusho, Takanosato wins 4th and final yusho as well, surprise maegashira 12 Tagaryū claims a yusho, Chiyonofuji claims 10th yusho.
- 1985 in sumo - Chiyonofuji wins 4 of the 6 tournaments, Asashio IV wins his first and only yusho, Hokuten'yū wins 2nd and last yusho. Kitanoumi retires. The new Ryōgoku Kokugikan is opened.
- 1986 in sumo - Stablemates Chiyonofuji and Hoshi* claim all six Yusho with five and one respectively. Futahaguro is promoted to Yokozuna. Takanosato retires.
- 1987 in sumo - Hokutoumi and Onokuni are promoted to yokozuna; Futahaguro is forced to retire
- 1988 in sumo - Asahifuji has first win, Chiyonofuji takes the last four tournaments and record for longest bout winning streak in modern sumo history - later surpassed by Hakuho
- 1989 in sumo - Chiyonofuji, three titles, and Hokutoumi, two titles, vie for dominance. Konishiki wins his first title and becomes the first foreign-born wrestler to be promoted to ōzeki.

*Hoshi would later become Hokutoumi

== 1990s ==
- 1990 in sumo - Asahifuji wins two titles and is promoted to yokozuna. Chiyonofuji, wins his 31st and final title
- 1991 in sumo - Hokutoumi and Asahifuji win their last titles, Kotonishiki wins his first, Kirishima and Kotofuji win their only titles. Onokuni retires
- 1992 in sumo - Asahifuji retires leaving no yokozuna for the next eight months, championships are split Takahanada* 2, Akebono 2, and 1 each for Konishiki and Mitoizumi
- 1993 in sumo - Akebono becomes first foreign-born yokozuna, has most dominant year at four titles; Futagoyama brothers take one each.
- 1994 in sumo - Musashimaru wins his first title, Takanohana wins four titles and is promoted to yokozuna for the January 1995 tournament
- 1995 in sumo - Takanohana dominates the year, taking four titles while his brother Wakanohana takes one
- 1996 in sumo - Takanohana takes four titles, and stablemate Takanonami one for a near year sweep
- 1997 in sumo - Futagoyama wrestlers continue championship dominance
- 1998 in sumo - Between them, the Futagoyama brothers dominate, Kotonishiki becomes only wrestler to win two titles while at a maegashira rank
- 1999 in sumo - Musashimaru dominates, winning four titles. Chiyotaikai and Dejima each win their first title.

*Takahanada would later become the 2nd Takanohana.

== 2000s ==
- 2000 in sumo - Musoyama, Takatōriki, and Kaiō win their first titles, Akebono wins his 11th and final title. Wakanohana retires.
- 2001 in sumo - Takanohana and Kaiō each win two titles. Kotomitsuki wins his only title and sweeps all special prizes.
- 2002 in sumo - Musashimaru wins three titles. Takanohana misses five of six tournaments due to injury. Asashōryū wins his first title.
- 2003 in sumo - Takanohana and Musashimaru retire, Asashōryū is promoted to yokozuna.
- 2004 in sumo - Asashōryū wins five of six titles. Kaiō wins his 5th and final title.
- 2005 in sumo - Asashōryū is first to sweep all six titles in his "grand slam" year.
- 2006 in sumo - Asashōryū wins four of six titles, Hakuhō wins his first title.
- 2007 in sumo - Hakuhō is promoted to yokozuna, Asashōryū is first yokozuna to be suspended. Tokitsukaze stable hazing scandal occurs.
- 2008 in sumo - Kotoōshū becomes the first European-born champion. Marijuana scandals begin.
- 2009 in sumo - Harumafuji wins his first title, Hakuhō wins 3 titles and establishes the all-time record of 86 wins from 90 matches in one year.

== 2010s ==
- 2010 in sumo - Asashōryū retires after an alleged nightclub brawl after winning his 25th and final title. Several wrestlers are suspended for illegal baseball gambling. Hakuhō establishes the postwar record with a 63-match winning streak.
- 2011 in sumo - A match-fixing scandal leads to the cancellation of the March basho with many resignations and expulsions. Hakuhō wins a record-tying 6th consecutive title.
- 2012 in sumo - Baruto and Kyokutenhō win their only titles. Harumafuji is promoted to yokozuna.
- 2013 in sumo - Hakuhō (four) and Harumafuji (two) win all the year's titles. Sokokurai becomes the first expelled wrestler to be reinstated. 48th yokozuna Taihō dies. Miyabiyama and Baruto retire.
- 2014 in sumo - Kakuryū wins his first title and is promoted to yokozuna. Hakuhō wins the remaining five titles.
- 2015 in sumo - Hakuhō wins a record-breaking 33rd title. JSA chairman Kitanoumi dies and is replaced by Hokutoumi.
- 2016 in sumo - Kotoshogiku and Goeido win the first titles by Japanese-born wrestlers in ten years. 58th yokozuna Chiyonofuji dies.
- 2017 in sumo - Kisenosato is promoted to yokozuna. Harumafuji retires following assault allegations against him.
- 2018 in sumo - Tochinoshin wins his sole title, the first title won by a maegashira since 2012. Takakeishō and Mitakeumi each win their first title.
- 2019 in sumo - Kisenosato retires. Asanoyama wins his first title.

== 2020s ==
- 2020 in sumo - Gōeidō and Kotoshōgiku retire. Tokushōryū wins the January basho from maegashira 17 west, the lowest rank from which anyone ever won a title. The May basho is cancelled due to the ongoing COVID-19 pandemic.
- 2021 in sumo - Kakuryū and Hakuhō retire. Hakuhō wins his 45th and final title. Terunofuji wins four of six titles and is promoted to yokozuna. Asanoyama is suspended for one year for violating COVID-19 protocols.
- 2022 in sumo - Six different wrestlers win titles, including three consecutive titles won by maegashira wrestlers; Wakatakakage, Ichinojō, and Abi each win their first titles.
- 2023 in sumo - Tochinoshin retires. Takakeishō and Kirishima each win two titles, Terunofuji and Hōshōryū one each.
- 2024 in sumo - Terunofuji wins his ninth and tenth titles. Takerufuji becomes the first wrestler of the modern era to win a title in his top division debut. Ōnosato wins two titles, the first in only his seventh tournament as a professional and becomes the fastest wrestler to achieve the rank of ōzeki in the modern era. Kotozakura wins his first title. 52nd yokozuna Kitanofuji and 64th yokozuna Akebono die. Takakeishō retires.
- 2025 in sumo - Terunofuji retires. Hōshōryū wins his second title and is promoted to yokozuna. Ōnosato clinches his fourth title and becomes yokozuna after only 13 tournaments, the fastest in the modern era. Hakuhō resigns from the Sumo Association. Aonishiki wins the November tournament and becomes both the first Ukrainian-born title-winner and Ukrainian-born ōzeki.
- 2026 in sumo - Aonishiki wins his second title but is demoted for July. Kirishima wins his third title, securing re-promotion to ōzeki. Wakatakakage wins a second title only to face severe injury. Aonishiki achieves immediate re-promotion by winning a third title.

== See also ==
- Glossary of sumo terms
- List of active sumo wrestlers
- List of past sumo wrestlers
- List of sumo record holders
- List of sumo top division champions
