= Jukkokutōge Cable Car =

Japanese funicular line in Kannami, Shizuoka Prefecture

Coordinates: 35°7′40″N 139°2′27″E

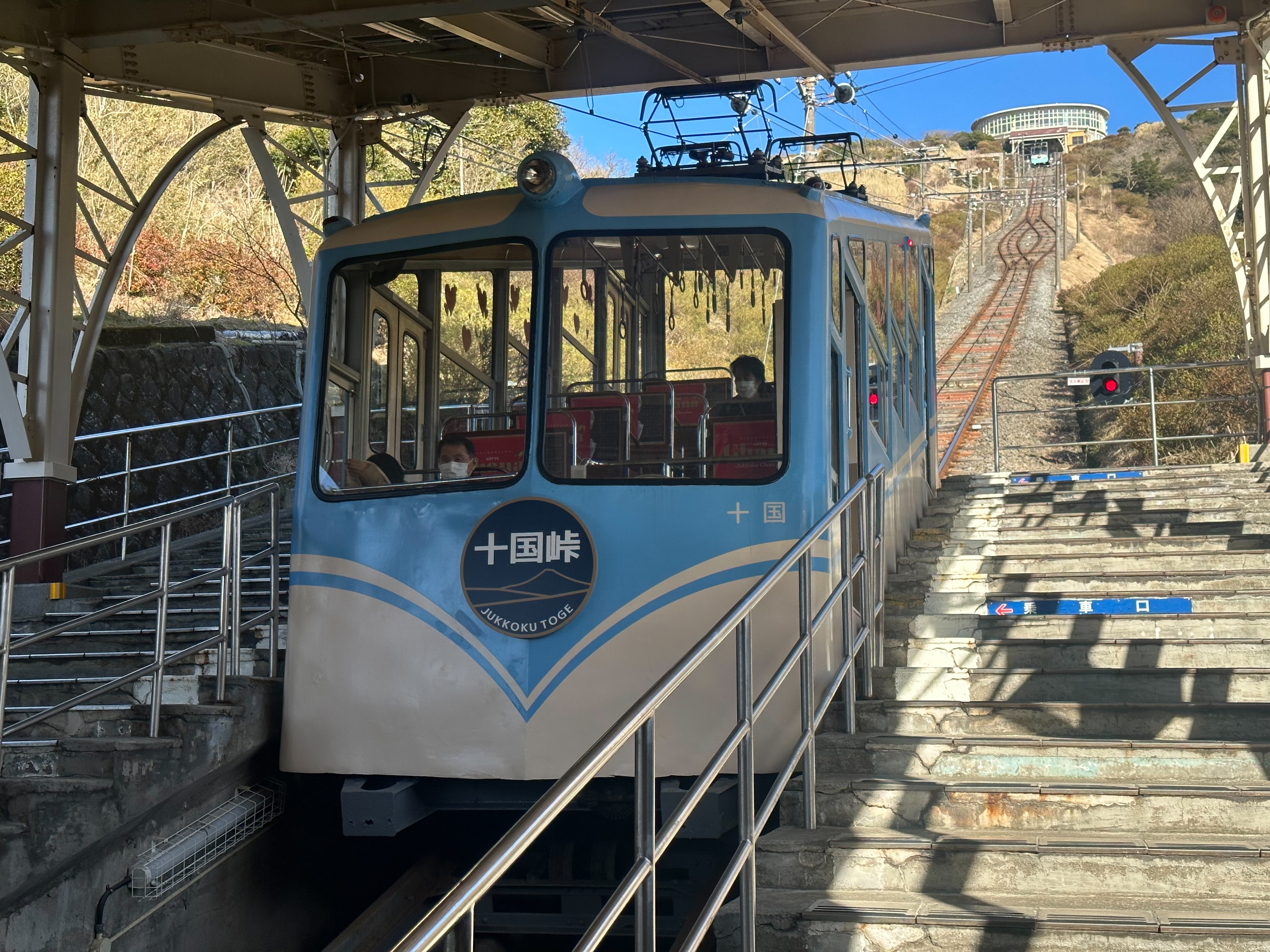
- Jukkokutōge Cable Car's funicular, 2024.

Overview
- Native name: 十国峠十国鋼索線
- Status: In operation
- Locale: Kannami, Tagata District, Shizuoka, Shizuoka Prefecture, Japan
- Termini: Jyukkokutoge-Sanroku; Jyukkokutoge-Sancho

Service
- Type: Funicular (Cable railway)

History
- Opened: October 16, 1956

Technical
- Track length: 0.3 km (0.19 mi)
- Track gauge: 1,435 mm

The Jukkokutōge Cable Car (十国峠ケーブルカー, Jukkokutōge Kēburukā), officially the Jikkoku Cable Line (十国鋼索線, Jikkoku Kōsaku-sen), is a funicular line in Kannami, Shizuoka Prefecture, Japan operated by the Fujikyu. On February 2022, Izuhakone Railway transferred this railway line to Fujikyu.

The cable car in motion.

The line was opened on October 16, 1956 by the Sunzu Railway Company, which was acquired by the Izuhakone Railway in 1957. The line climbs Jukkoku Pass, literally meaning "ten countries pass", as it is claimed that ten "countries" (old provinces of Japan) can be seen from the summit of the pass. The line runs on average every eight minutes, with travel time in each direction at 3 minutes. The cars on the line were painted in the colors of the Seibu Lions baseball team until 2018.

== Description ==
The 316m line connects Jukkokutoge-Sanroku Station and Jukkokutoge-Sancho Station. The line climbs Jukkoku Pass, literally meaning "ten countries pass", as it is claimed that ten "countries" (old provinces of Japan) can be seen from the summit of the pass. The line runs on average every 15 minutes, with travel time in each direction at 3 minutes. The line is operated by the Jukkokutoge corporation, a member of the Fujikyu Group. The line uses standard gauge tracks, and is the only cable car line in Japan to do so after Myoken Cable's closure in 2023. The line was constructed using tracks of the partially closed sections of the previously mentioned cable car line.

The line operates using two cable cars made in 1955 by Hitachi, each numbered 1 and 2. When the line was transferred from Izuhakone Railway, a member of the Seibu Railway group to the current operator Jukkokutoge Corporation, the buildings of the line were renovated along with other associated buildings. The two cable cars were also repainted from the Saitama Seibu Lions colors following this change.

On summer 2027, this cable railway will be discontinued due to aging and will be replaced by slope car.

== View from Jukkokutōge station ==
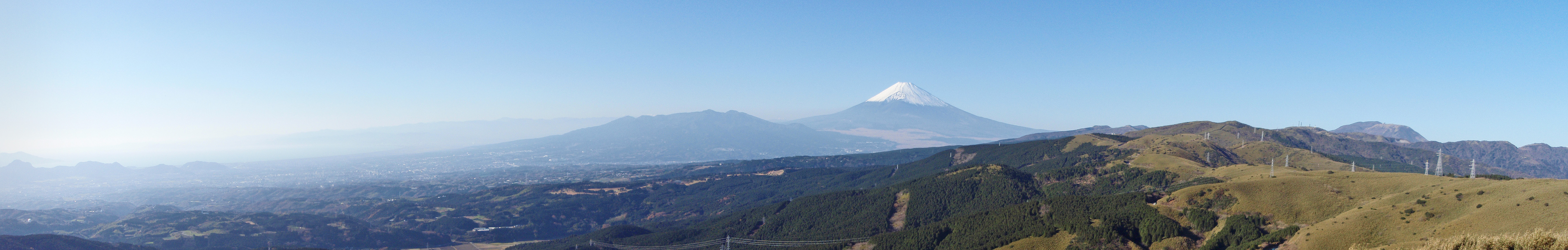
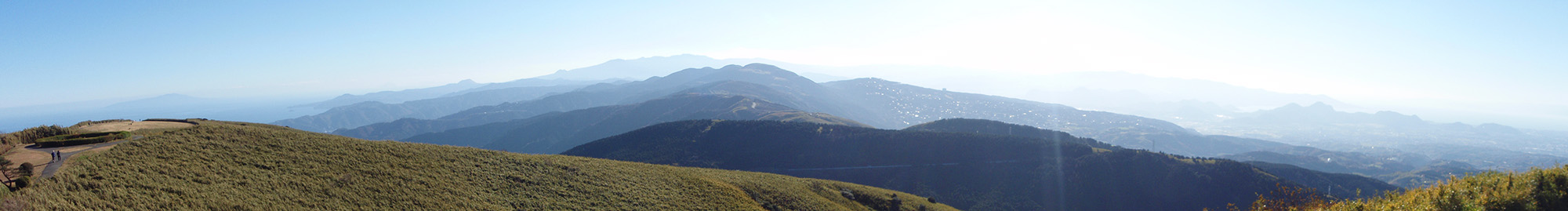

== See also ==
- Hakone Komagatake Ropeway
- List of funicular railways
