= Mount Kami (Hakone) =

Highest peak of Mount Hakone, Japan

Coordinates: 35°14′00″N 139°01′14″E

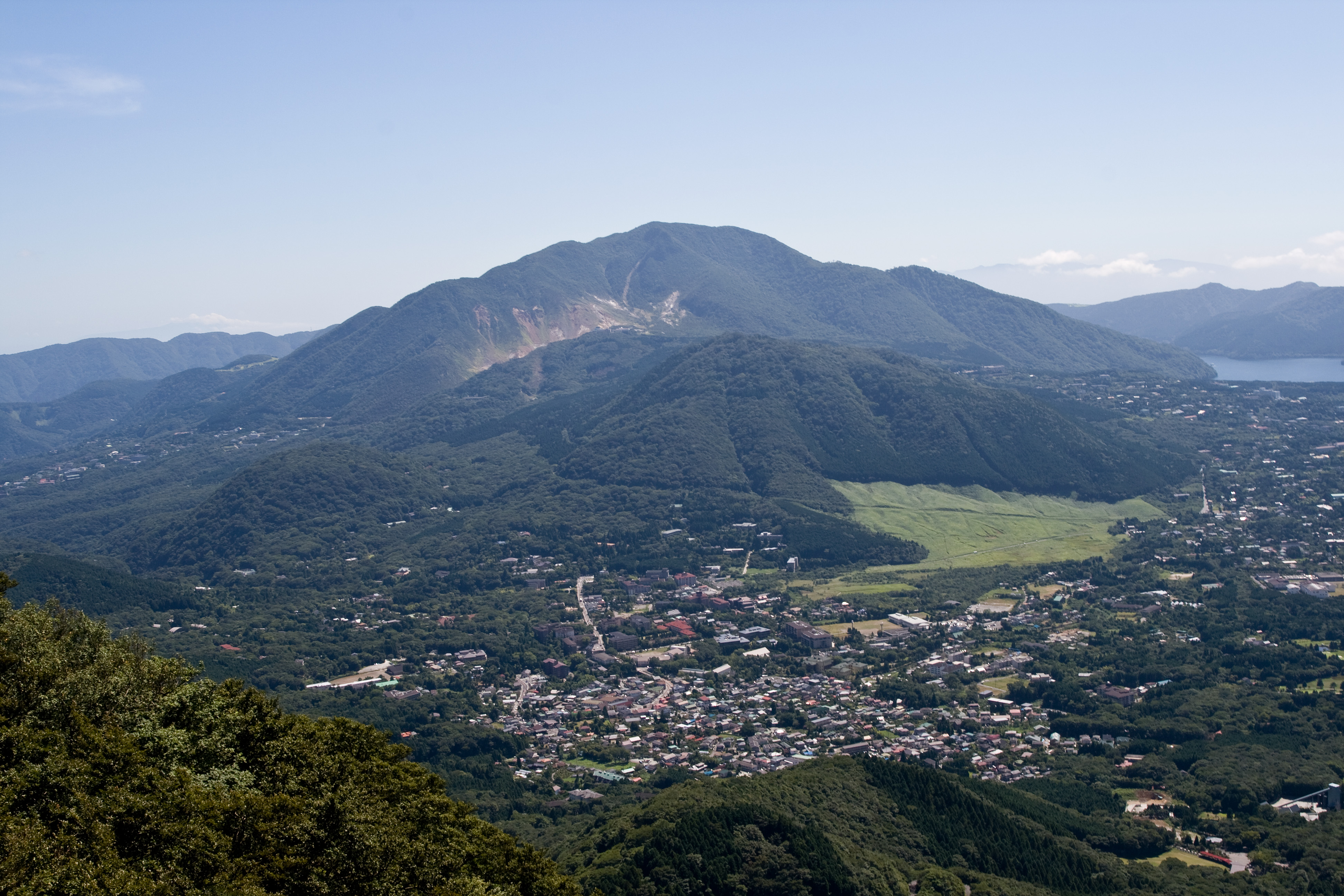
The view of the central cones of Mount Hakone with Mount Kami as the highest peak, from Mount Kintoki

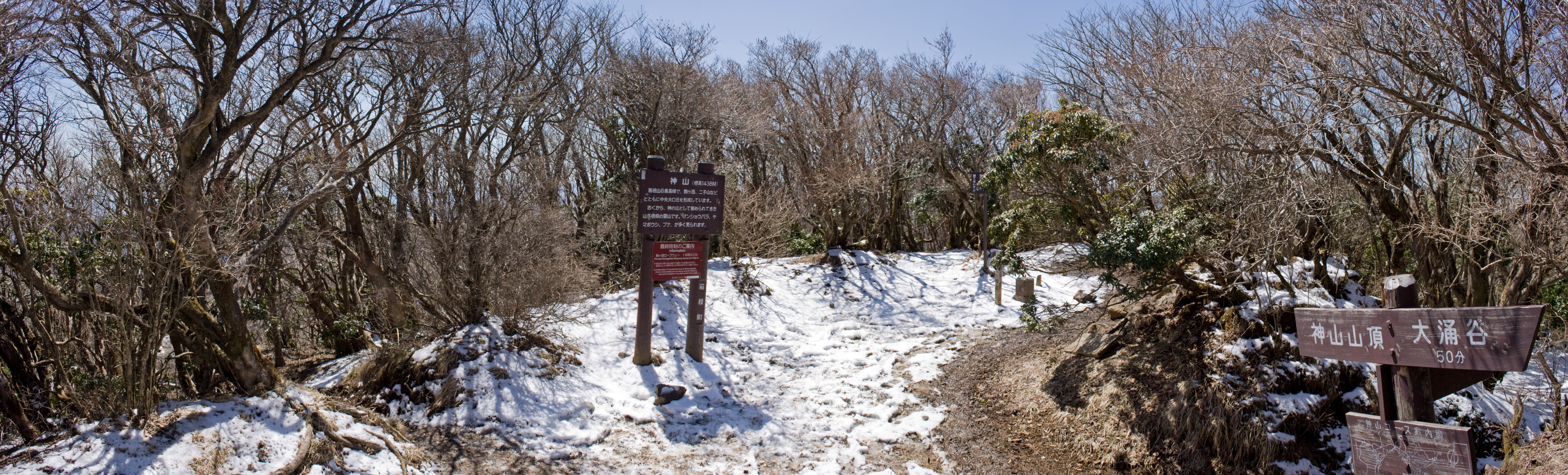
On the trail to Mount Kami (to left) and Owakudani (to right), in early April

Mount Kami (Kami-yama (神山; lit. 'god mountain')) is the highest peak of Mount Hakone, at 1,438 metres (4,718 ft), in Hakone, Kanagawa, Japan. Worshipping Mount Hakone with its highest peak is recorded in a 12th-century document, as having started at the time of the legendary Emperor Kōshō (475 BC to 393 BC).

== Climbing Mount Kami ==
Climbing mountains is a popular sport in the Mount Hakone area. To the top of Mount Kami, it takes about one hour fifteen minutes from Mount Koma Summit Station of the Hakone Komagatake Ropeway (one hour twenty minutes, on return), or one hour twenty minutes from Ōwakudani Station of the Hakone Ropeway (one hour, on return). The connection to Ōwakudani has been closed since 2015 due to fumarolic activity at the latter. The top of Mount Kami is covered with tall trees, which prevent a nice view of its surroundings.

== See also ==
- Fuji-Hakone-Izu National Park
