= Myoken Cable =

Former funicular line in Hyogo, Japan

Coordinates: 34°55′25.3″N 135°27′25″E

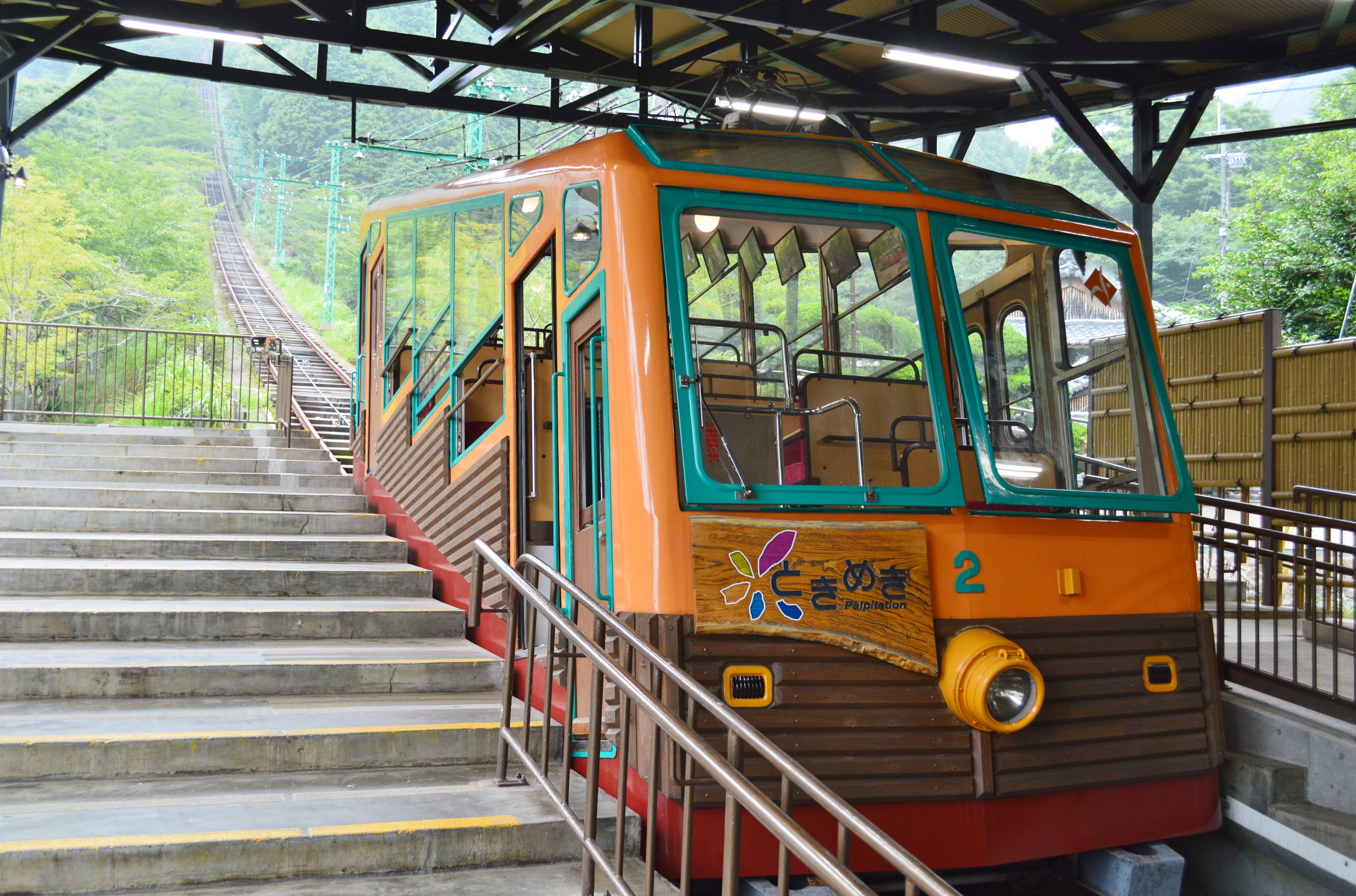
- Kurokawa station in 2017

Overview
- Native name: 妙見の森ケーブル
- Status: Permanently closed

Service
- Type: Cable car (Funicular)

History
- Opened: 1 August 1925
- Reclosed: 3 December 2023
- Closed: 11 February 1944
- Reopened: 22 April 1960

Technical
- Line length: 0.6 km (0.37 mi)
- Track gauge: 1,435 mm (Standard gauge)

The Myoken Cable (妙見ケーブル, Myōken Kēburu), officially the Myoken no Mori Cable (妙見の森ケーブル, Myōken No Mori Kēburu), was a Japanese funicular line that climbs Mount Myoken in Kawanishi, Hyōgo. It was operated by Nose Electric Railway. It was opened by Myōken Cable Railway (妙見鋼索鉄道, Myōken Kōsaku Tetsudō) in 1925, comprising the Kabu Line and Jōbu Line, both of which were closed in 1944. The Kabu Line reopened in 1960 as Myoken Cable, while the Jōbu Line became a chairlift. The line was known as the Cable Line (鋼索線, Kōsaku-sen) prior to 16 March 2013 when the line received its current name. After 63 years of operations, the Myoken Cable Line permanently ceased operations on 3 December 2023.

== History ==
The line was first opened on 1 August 1925. The Myoken Cable line in its first period consisted of two separate lines. However, the entire line was closed and the equipment were removed on 11 February 1944. The equipments for the upper part of the line was later reused for the construction of the Jukkokutōge Cable Car in 1956. The lower part of the line was reconstructed by the Nose Electric Railway on 22 April 1960, while the upper part was rebuilt as an aerial lift.

Due to aging equipments and decrease in customers, the cable line and the chair lift, along with the other "Myoken no Mori" attractions were permanently closed on 3 December 2023.

== Stations ==
Station	Japanese	Location
Myoken Cable/Kabu Line
Kurokawa	黒川	Kawanishi, Hyōgo
Cable Sanjō	ケーブル山上	Kawanishi, Hyōgo
Myōken Lift/Jobu Line (~1944)
Myōken-no-mizu Hiroba-mae	妙見の水広場前	Kawanishi, Hyōgo
Myōkensan	妙見山	Kawanishi, Hyōgo

== See also ==
- List of funicular railways
- List of railway lines in Japan
