= Mount Takanosu (Kanagawa) =

Mountain in Hakone, Kanagawa, Japan

Coordinates: 35°13′37″N 139°03′15″E

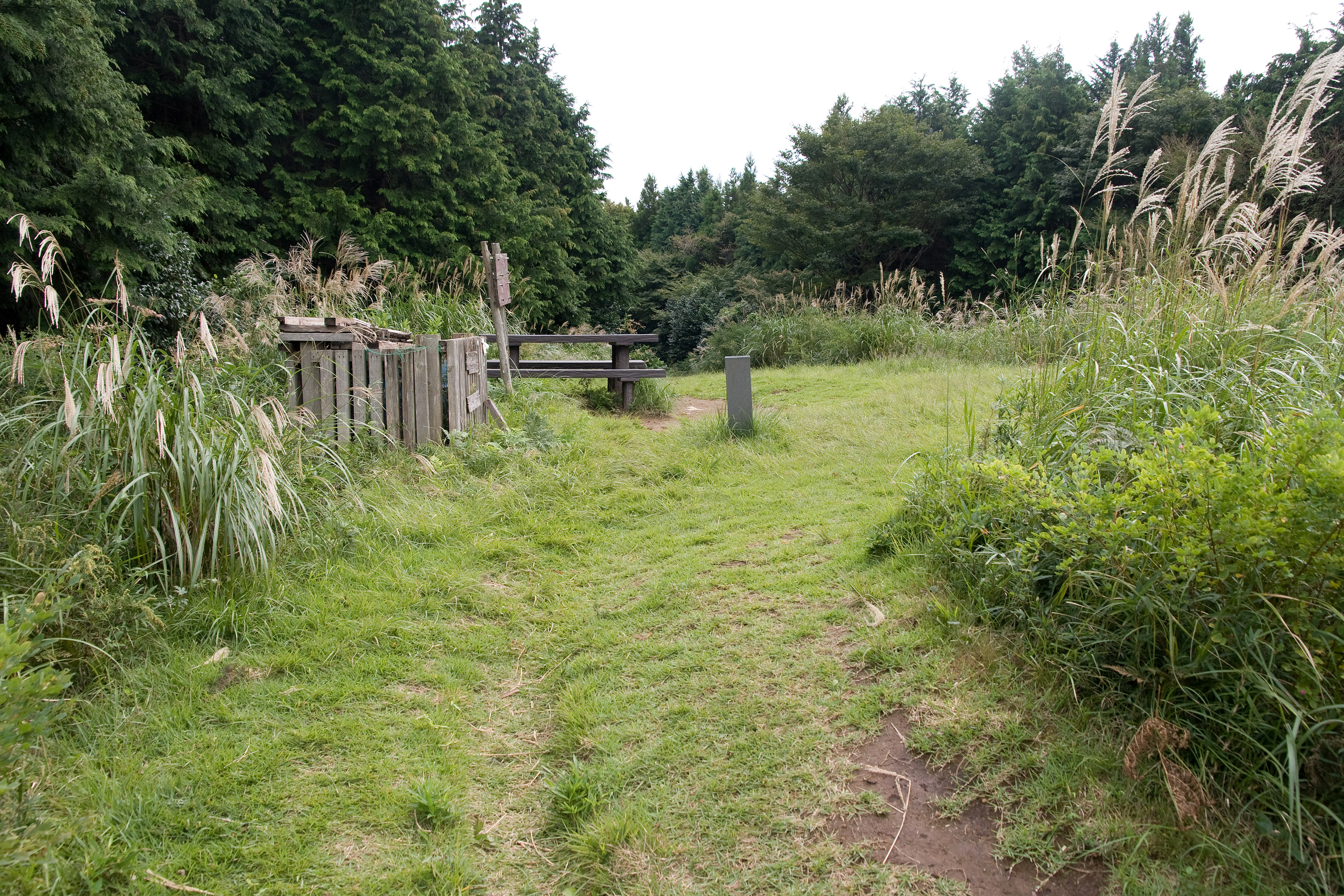
At the top of Mount Takanosu

Mount Takanosu (Japanese: 鷹巣山) is a mountain with a height of 834 meters, located in Hakone, Kanagawa, Japan. Together with Mount Sengen (Kanagawa), they sit on the Older outer rim of Mount Hakone.

There are a few trails for hiking to the top of Mount Takanosu, such as the route from Horaien (箱根小涌園蓬莱園) to Mount Takanosu via Mount Sengen and down to Lake Ashi. Nearby are the Chisuji Falls (千条ノ滝) and the Hiryu Falls (飛龍ノ滝).

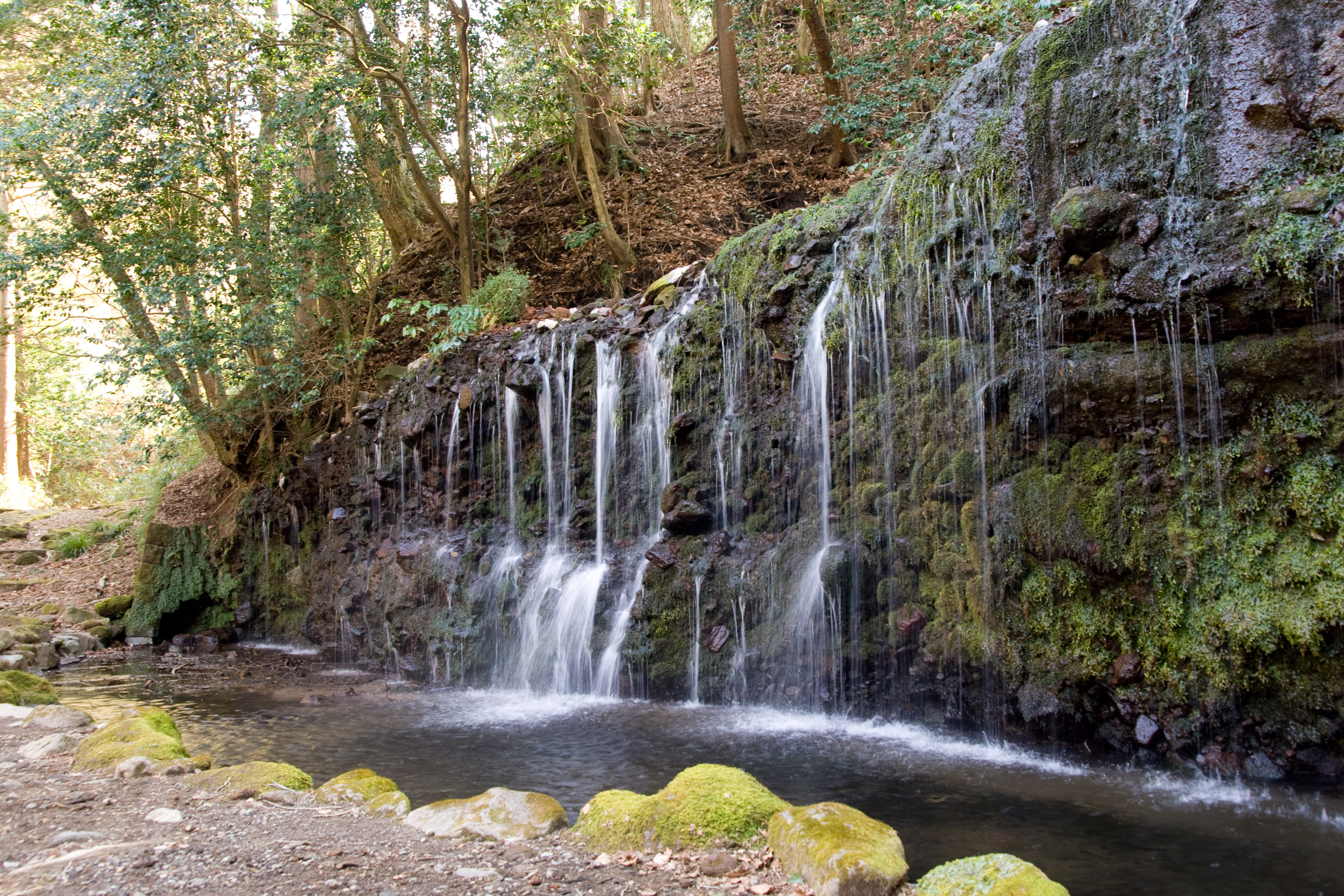
Chisuji Falls (千条の滝)

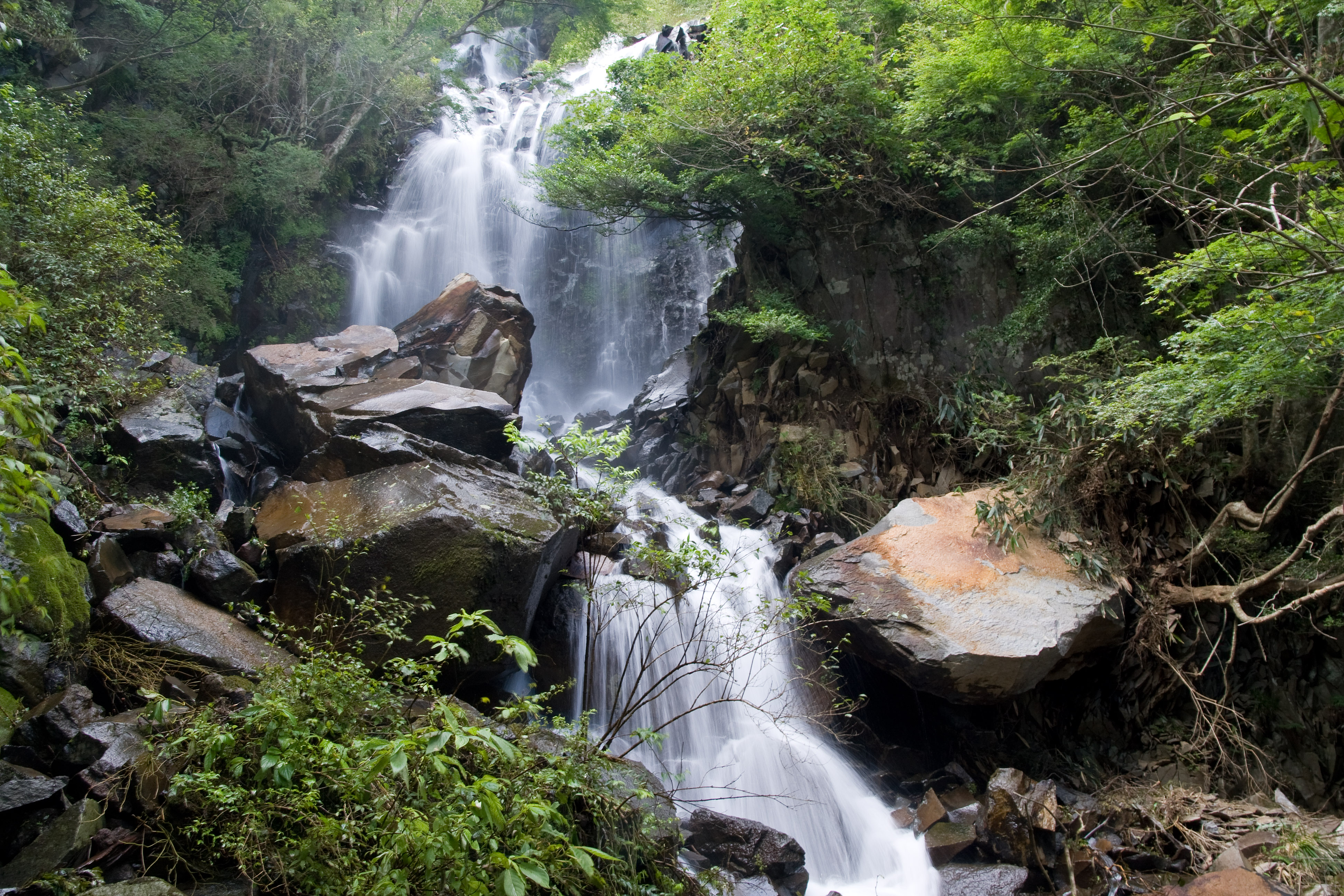
Hiru Falls (飛龍ノ滝)

== See also ==
- Fuji-Hakone-Izu National Park
