= Mount Futago (Hakone) =

Mountain in Hakone, Kanagawa, Japan

Coordinates: 35°12′27″N 139°2′53″E

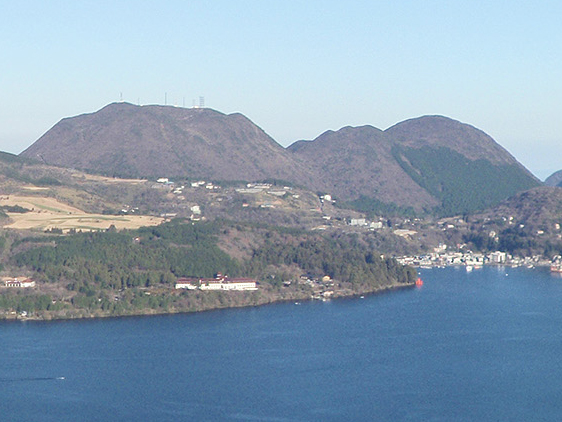
Mount Futago viewed from west, with Lake Ashi in the foreground.

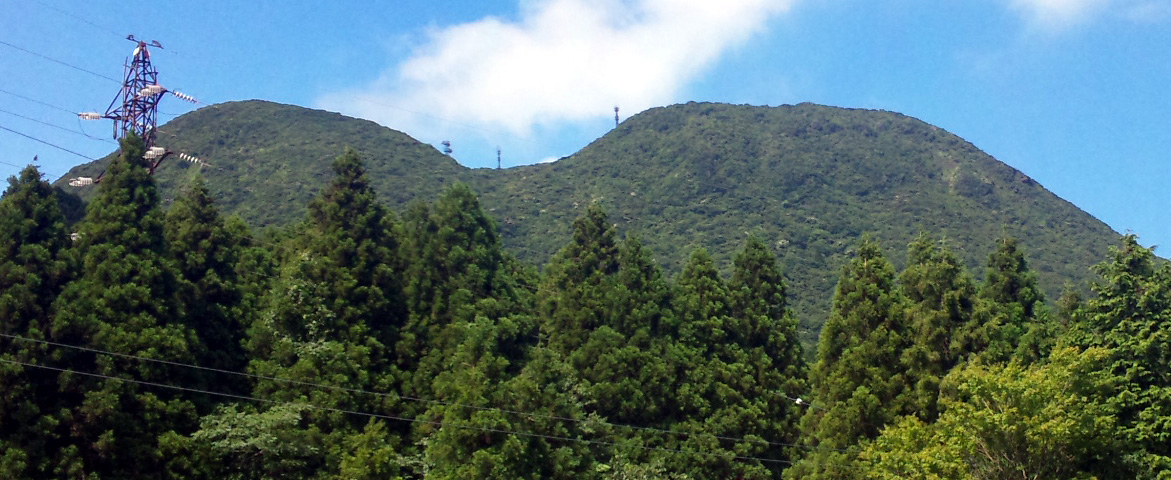
Mount Futago viewed from southwest by south

Mount Futago (Japanese: 二子山 = Futago-Yama) is a twin-peak mountain in the central volcanic cones of Mount Hakone, located in Hakone, Kanagawa, Japan. It consists of Upper Futago Mountain (1,099 meters) in the north, and Lower Futago Mountain (1,065 meters) in the south.

Although entering this mountain is prohibited in order to preserve nature, Mount Futago is easily recognizable from various directions because of its prominent twin peaks and the relay towers of NTT Telecommunications East and NTT Docomo, which play an important role in Japan's busy east-west telecommunications.

== In popular culture ==
- Mount Futago appears as a prominent location in the 6th episode of the anime Neon Genesis Evangelion and the movie The End of Evangelion, both from the same franchise.

== See also ==
- Fuji-Hakone-Izu National Park
