= Hakone Komagatake Ropeway =

Japanese aerial lift in the country of Japan

Coordinates: 35°13′10″N 139°1′6.2″E

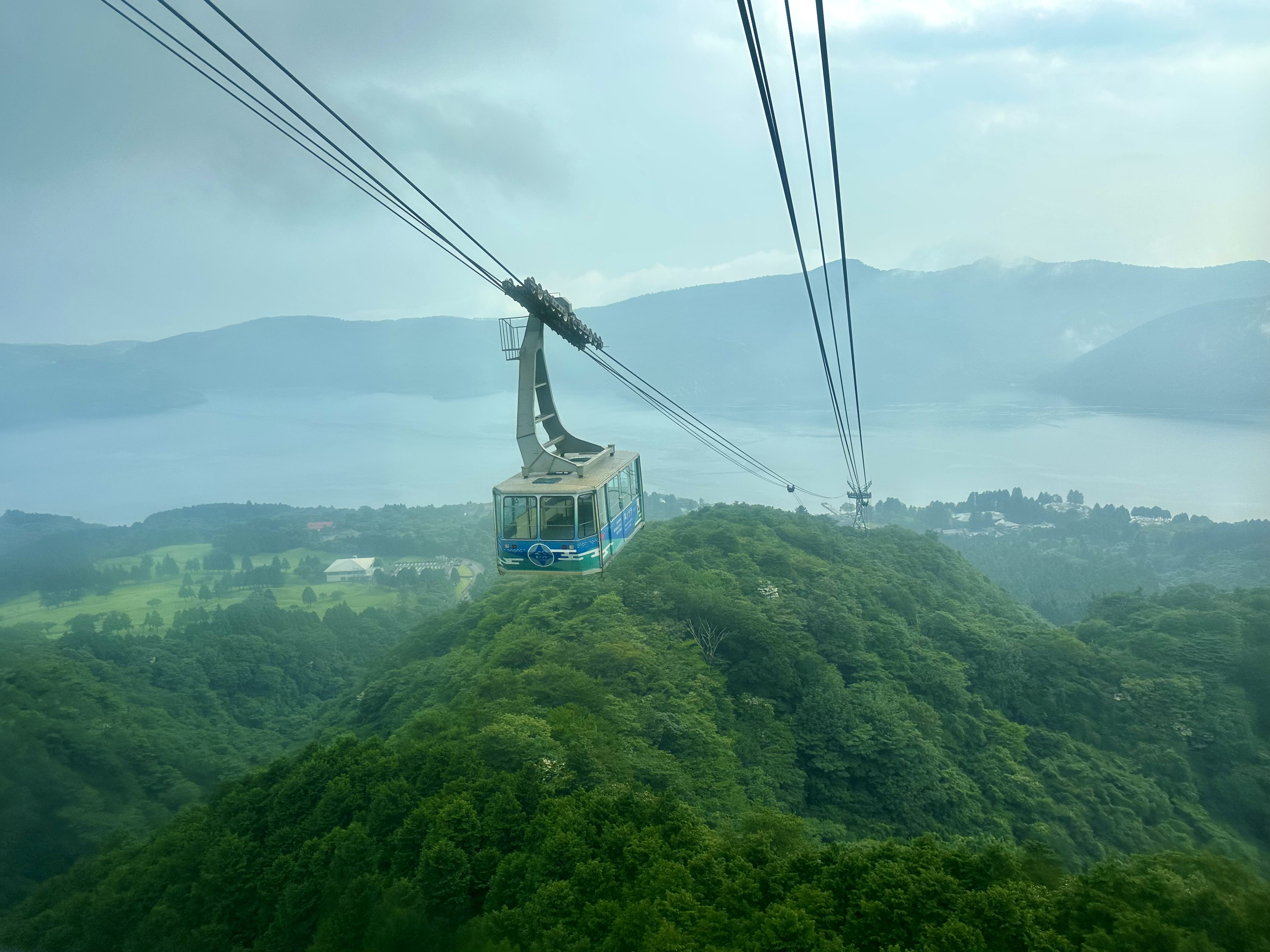
Hakone Komagatake Ropeway

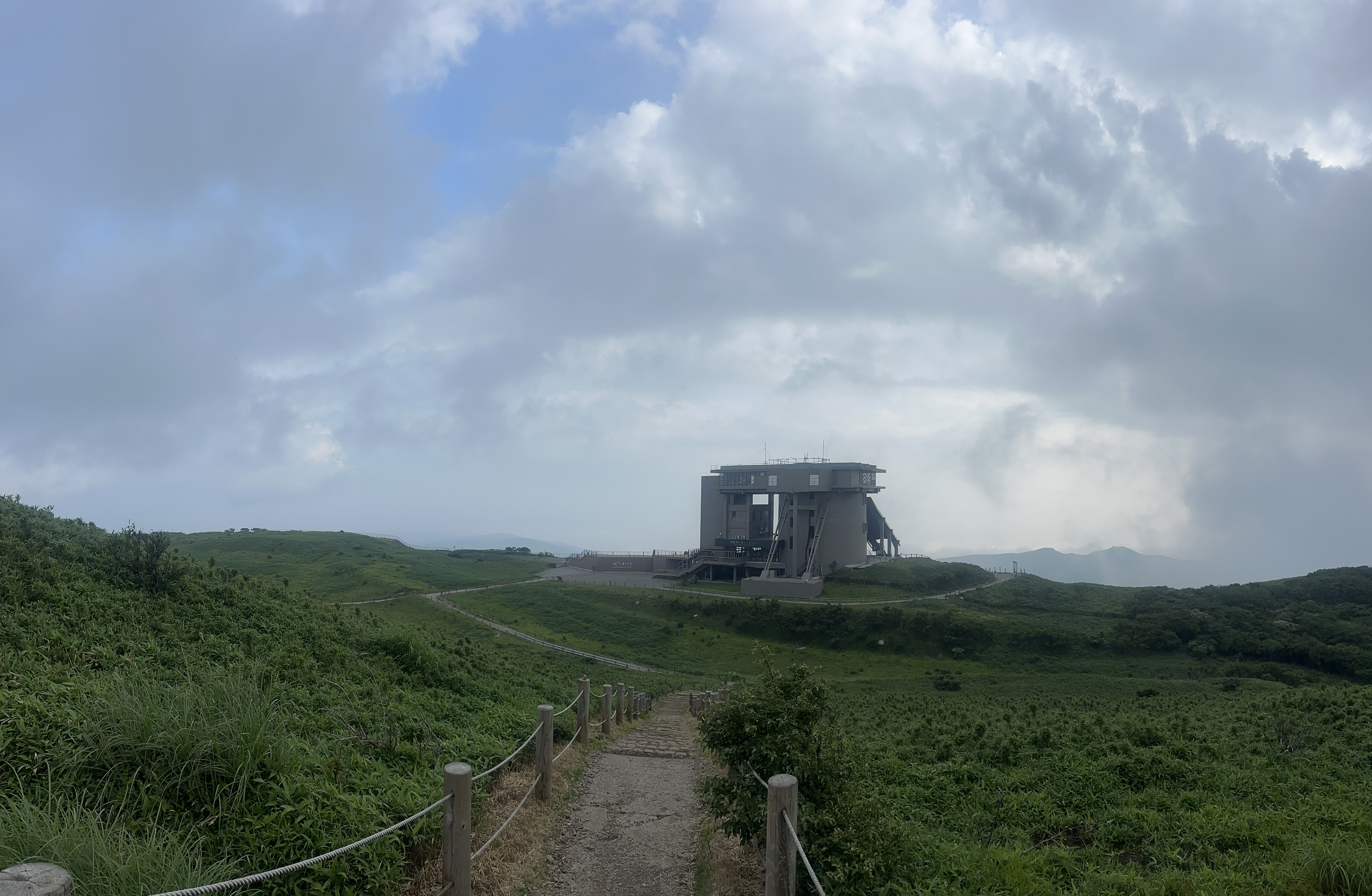
Station of summit

Hakone Komagatake Ropeway, 2025

The Hakone Komagatake Ropeway (箱根駒ヶ岳ロープウェー, Hakone Komagatake Rōpuwē), officially the Komagatake Ropeway Line (駒ヶ岳索道線, Komagatake Sakudō-sen), is a Japanese aerial lift line in Hakone, Kanagawa, operated by Seibu Prince Hotels Worldwide. Before being transferred to Seibu Prince Hotels Worldwide, which operates Hakone-en in 2016, this was owned by Izu Hakone Railway. The line, opened in 1963, climbs Mount Koma (駒ヶ岳) from the Lake Ashi lakeside.

From 1957 to 2005, Izu Hakone Railway also operated Hakone Komagatake Funicular (駒ヶ岳鋼索線) which climbed Komagatake from east side.

== Basic data ==
- System: Aerial tramway, 2 track cables and 2 haulage ropes
- Cable length: 1.8 kilometres (1.1 mi)
- Vertical interval: 590 m (1,936 ft)
- Maximum gradient: 30°15′
- Operational speed: 5 m/s
- Passenger capacity per a cabin: 101
- Cabins: 2
- Time required for single ride: 7 minutes

== Gallery ==
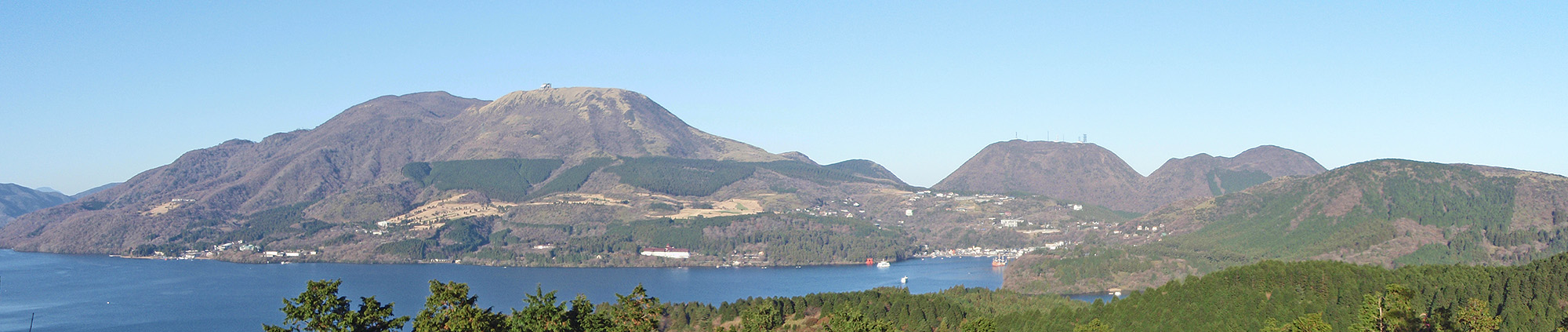
Mount Komagatake and Lake Ashi.
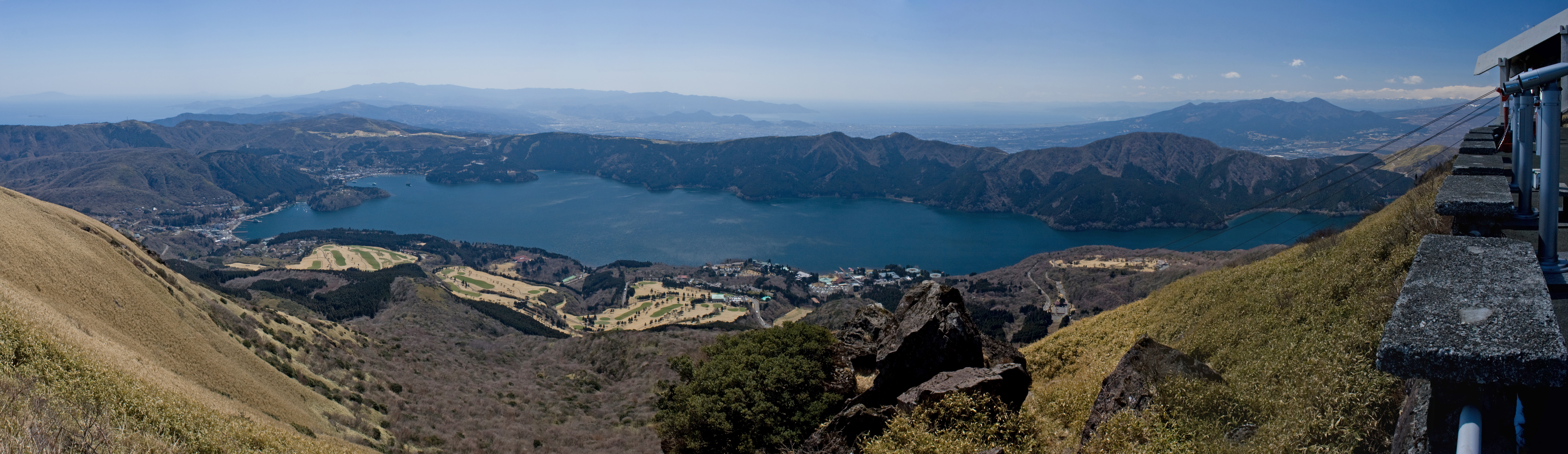
Viewed from Mt.Komagatake.

== See also ==
- Jukkokutōge Cable Car
- List of aerial lifts in Japan
