= Mount Koma (Hakone) =

Mountain in the country of Japan

Coordinates: 35°13′10″N 139°1′6.2″E

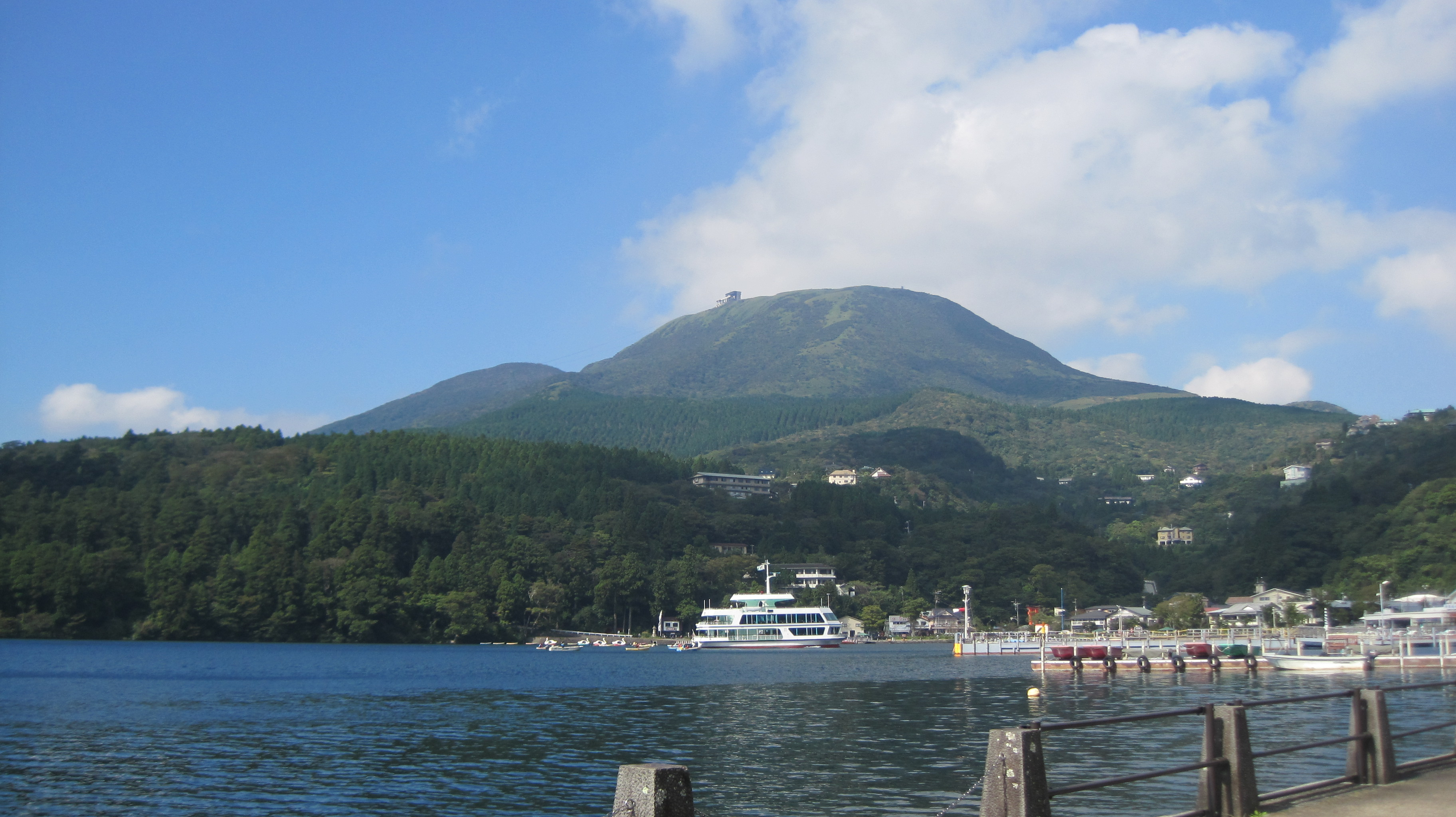
Mount Koma, viewed from Lake Ashi

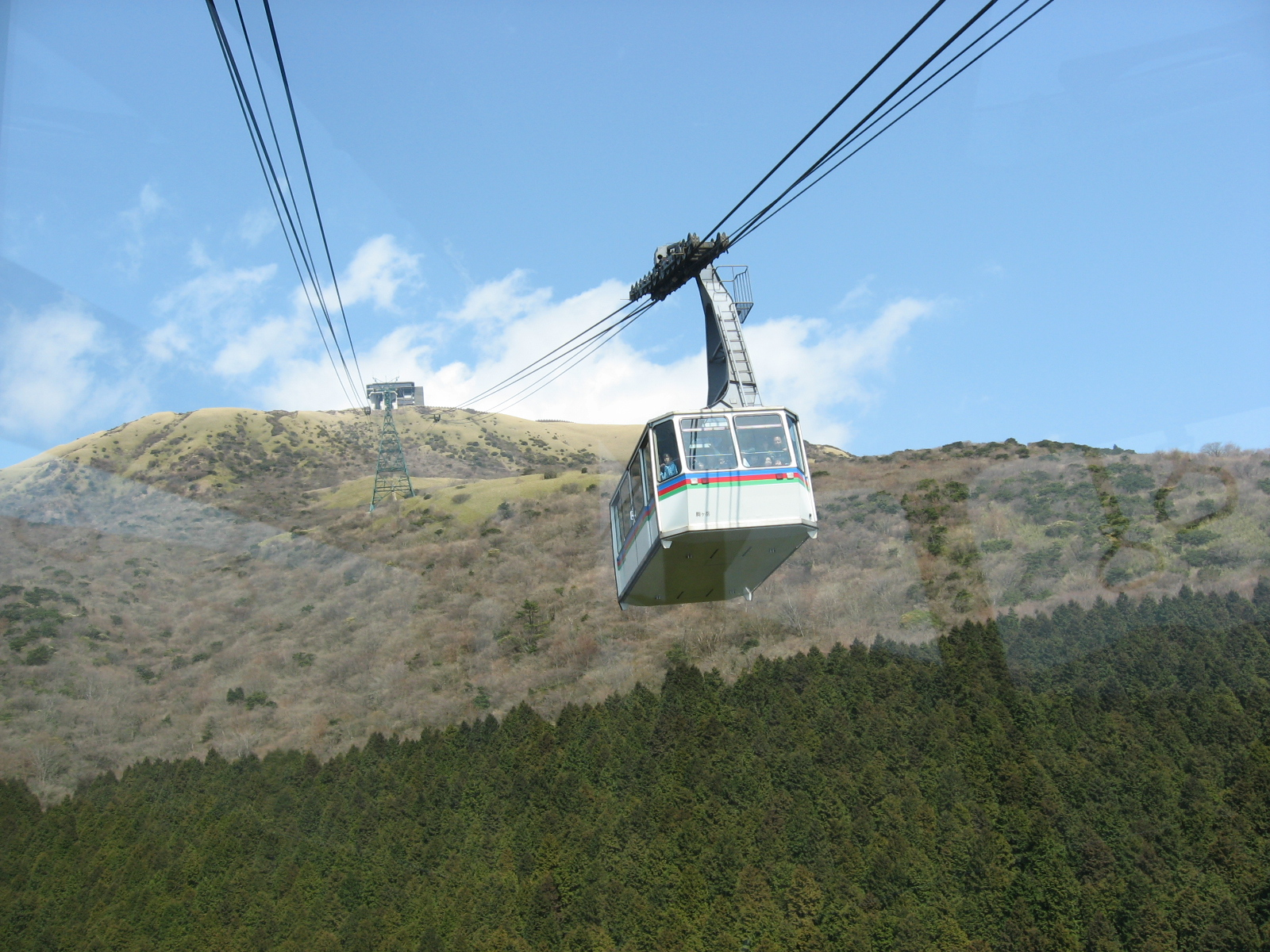
To the summit of Mount Koma, by the Hakone Komagatake Ropeway

Mount Koma or Hakone Komagatake (Japanese: 箱根駒ヶ岳), with the altitude of 1,356 meters, is one of the peaks of the central cone of Mount Hakone, located in Hakone, Kanagawa Prefecture. Its summit, a grass field that offers a great view of its surroundings, is visited by many hikers, using the 1,800-meter-long Hakone Komagatake Ropeway from the Hakone Resort Complex on Lake Ashi.

Also at the summit is the Hakone Motomiya, founded in 1964, the original shrine of the Hakone Shrine.

== See also ==
- Fuji-Hakone-Izu National Park
