= Mount Hakone =

Complex volcano on the island of Honshu, Japan

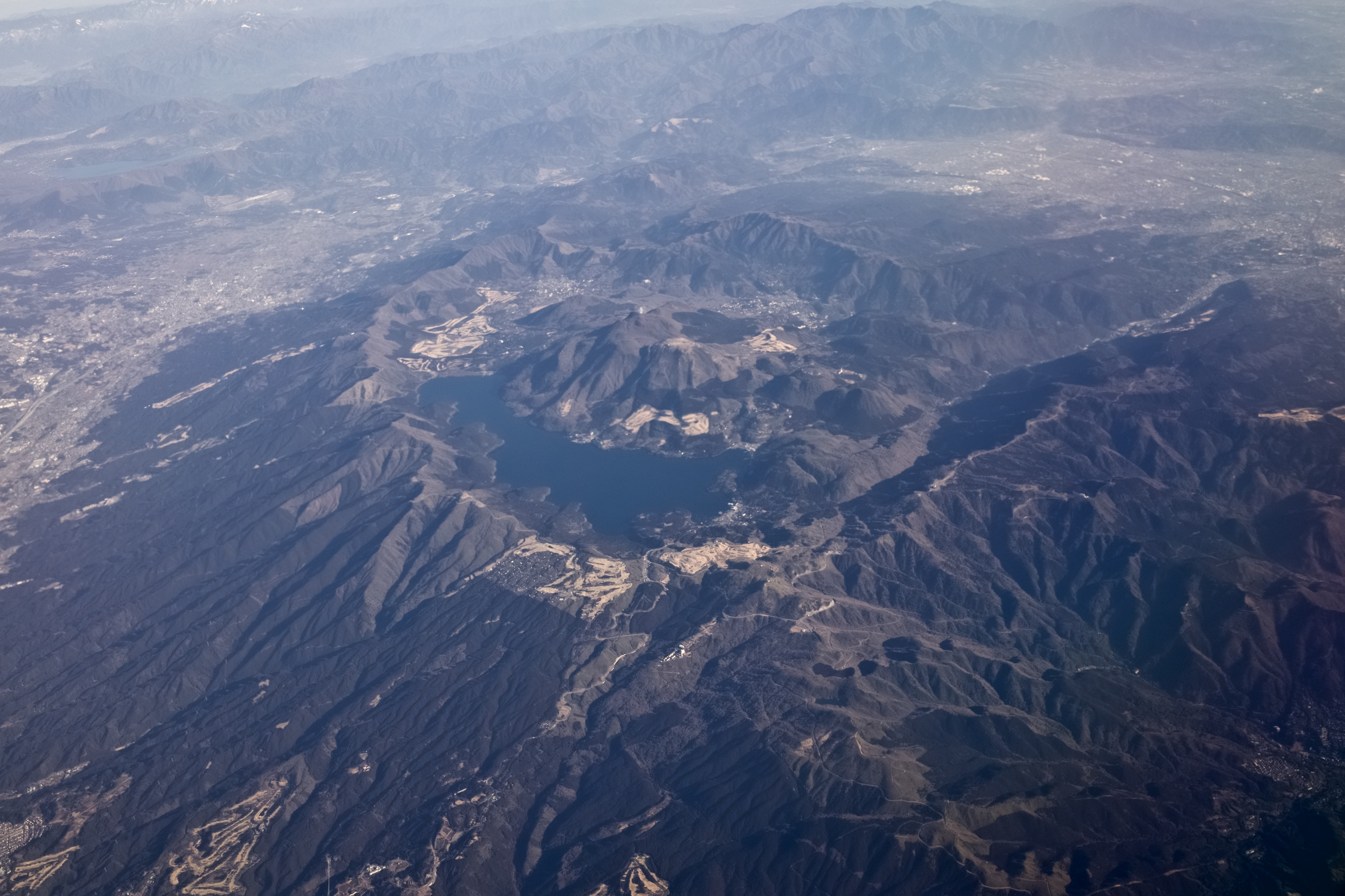
- Hakone volcano from the SW.

Highest point
- Elevation: 1,438 metres (4,718 ft)
- Coordinates: 35.230°N 139.024°E

Naming
- Native name: 箱根山 (Japanese)

Geography
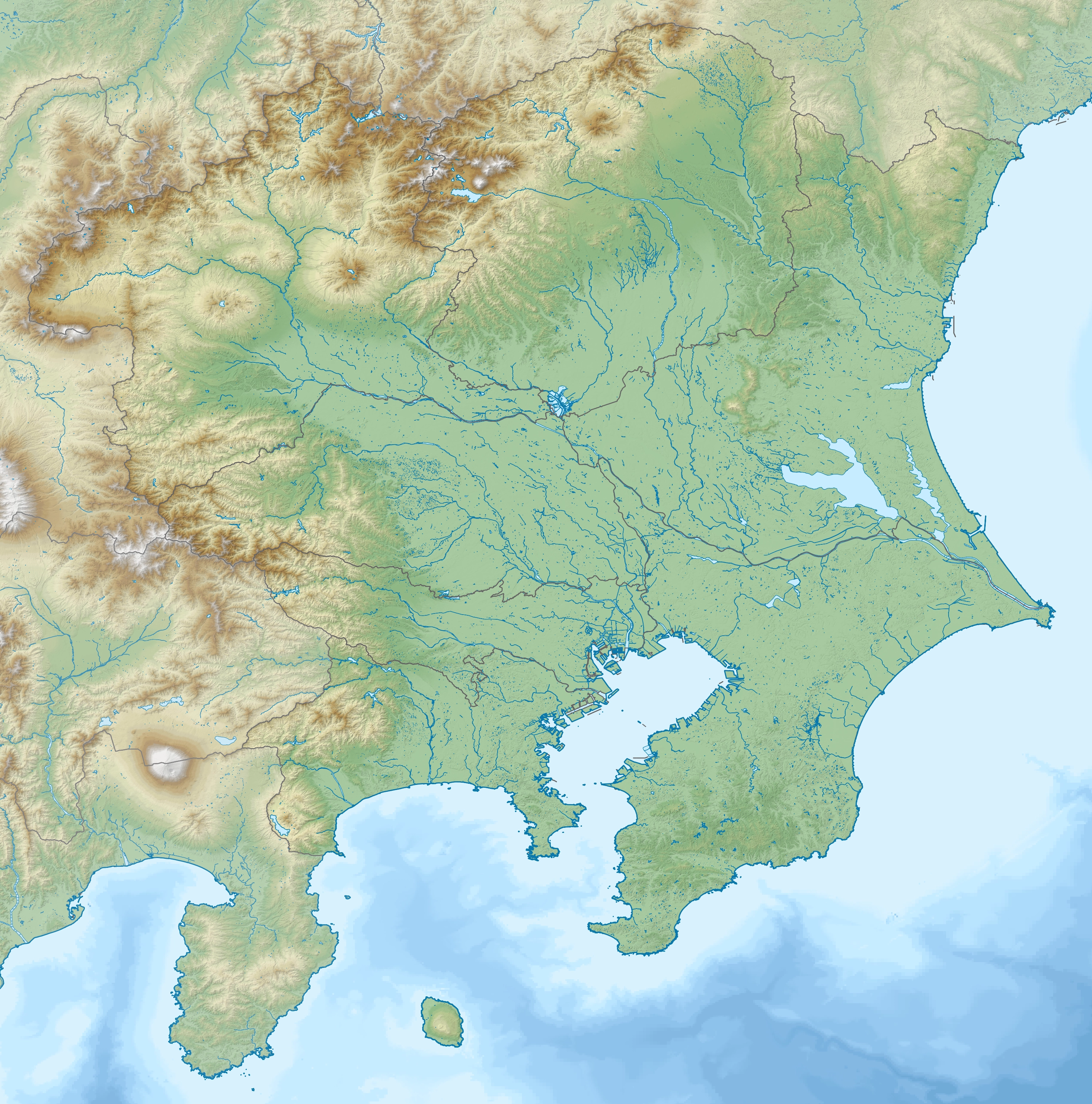
- Location within Japan Location within Kanto Area Location within Kanagawa Prefecture
- Location: Hakone, Kanagawa Prefecture, Honshu

Geology
- Mountain type: Complex calderas
- Volcanic arc: Izu–Bonin–Mariana Arc
- Last eruption: June to July 2015

Mount Hakone (箱根山, Hakoneyama), with its highest peak Mount Kami (1,438 meters), is a complex volcano in Kanagawa Prefecture, Japan that is truncated by two overlapping calderas, the largest of which is 10 × 11 km wide. The calderas were formed as a result of two major explosive eruptions about 180,000 and 49,000–60,000 years ago. Lake Ashi lies between the southwestern caldera wall and a half dozen post-caldera lava domes that arose along a southwest–northeastern trend cutting through the center of the calderas. Dome growth occurred progressively to the south, and the largest and youngest of them, Mount Kami, forms the high point of Hakone. The calderas are breached to the east by the Haya River canyon. Mount Ashigara is a parasitic cone.

The latest magmatic eruptive activity at Hakone occurred 2,900 years ago. It produced a pyroclastic flow and a lava dome in the explosion crater, although phreatic eruptions took place as recently as the 12–13th centuries AD.

According to the nearby Hakone Shrine, the Komagatake peak has been the object of religious veneration since ancient times.

== History ==
The geological history of Mount Hakone, has been researched by Dr. Hisashi Kuno et al., with Mount Hakone, located in Hakone, Kanagawa, Japan, as a volcano from the Quaternary period.

Mount Hakone started about 500,000 years ago with the eruptions, that created Mount Kintoki and Mount Myōjō on the current "Old outer rim"; and the subsequent eruptions about 160,000 years ago made the "New outer rim", on which are Mount Sengen and Mount Takanosu (Kanagawa).

From 50,000 years ago, new eruptions further created in the "Central volcanic cones" Mount Kami (35.233333°N 139.020556°E), the highest peak in Hakone, Mount Koma and other peaks; and about 300,000 years ago, the lava domes such as Mount Futago (Hakone) emerged.

Later about 3,000 years ago, the phreatic eruption on the northwest side of Mount Kami caused landslides, creating the Owakudani and, in the huge caldera, the Sengokuhara and Lake Ashi.

== Gallery ==
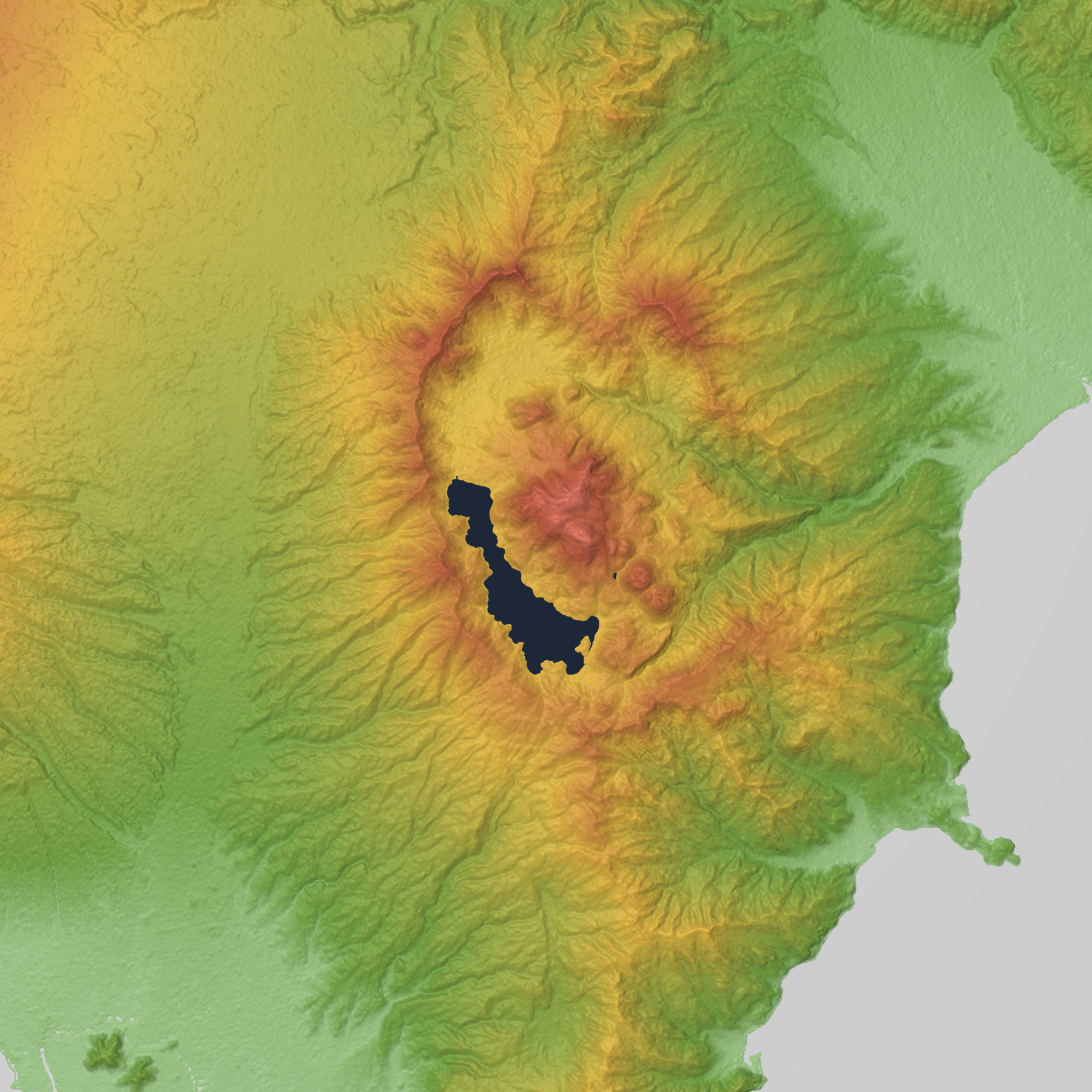
Topographic map

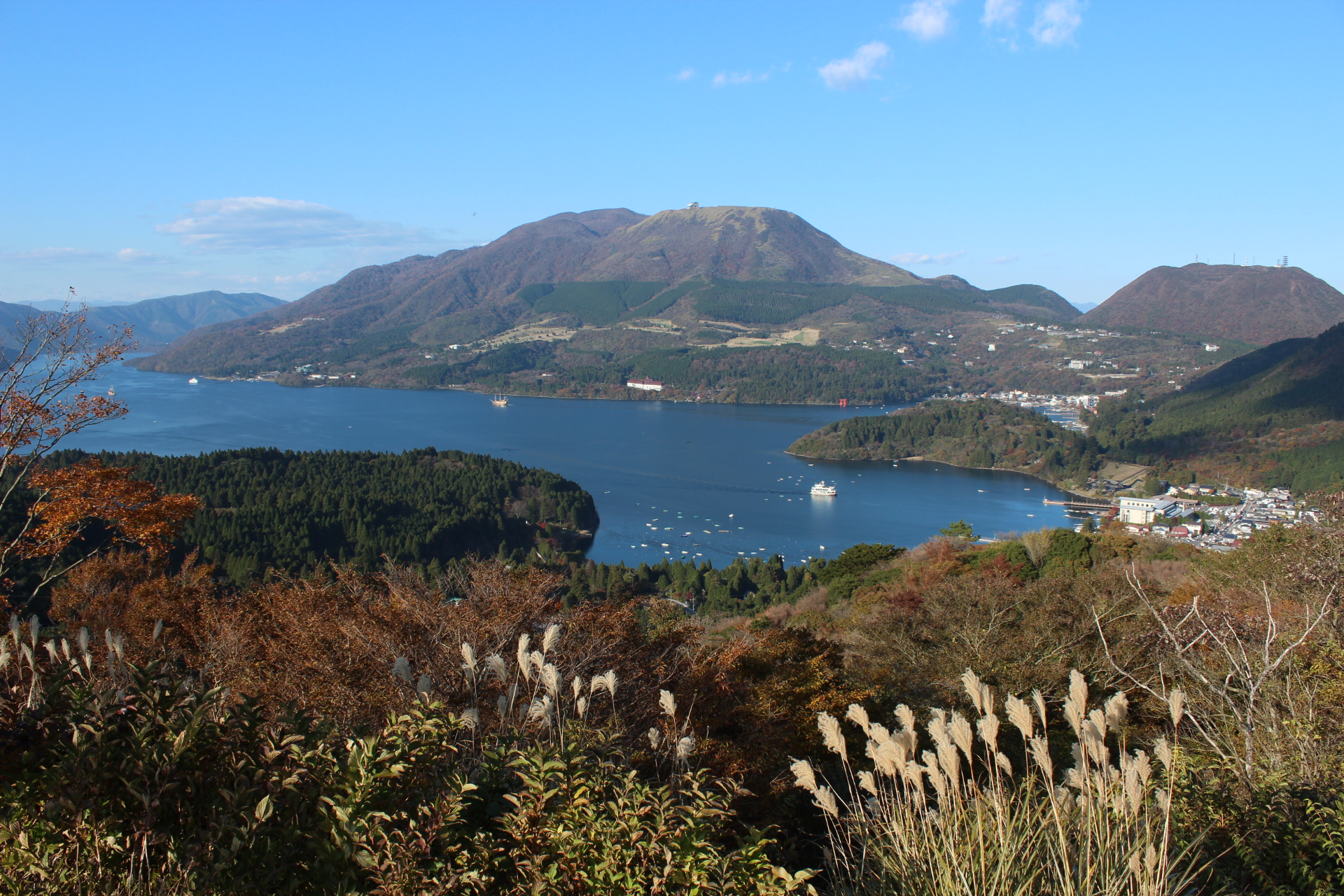
The central cones of Mount Hakone: Mounts Kami, Kanmuri, Koma, Futago, etc.

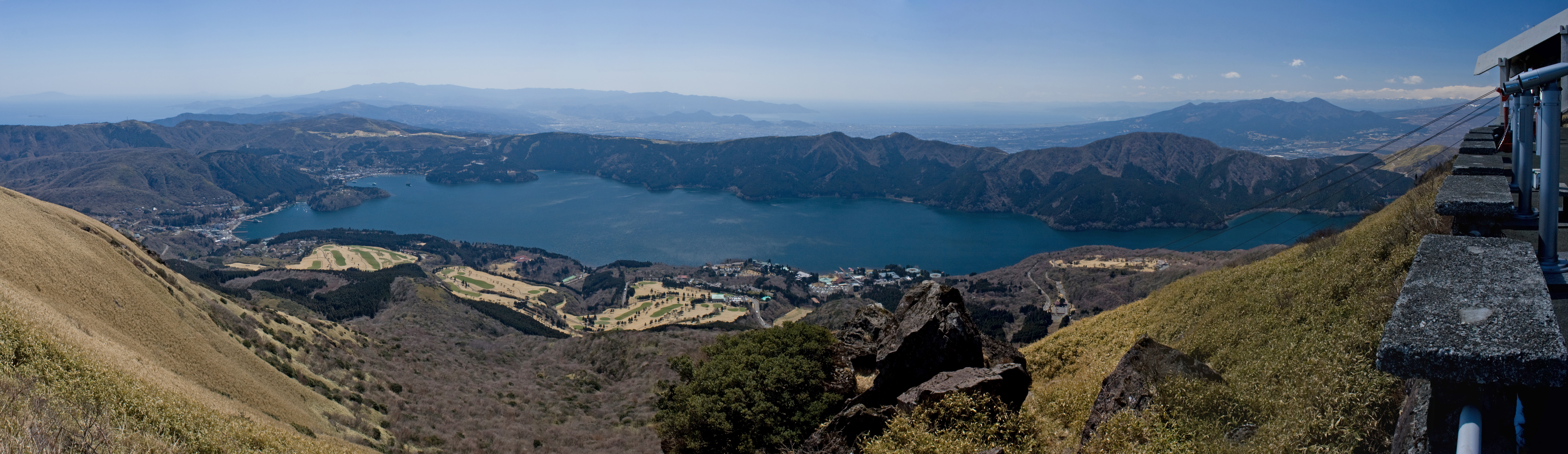
Lake Ashi viewed from the central cone of Mt. Komagatake's lava dome.

== See also ==
- List of volcanoes in Japan
- List of mountains in Japan
- History of Mount Hakone
