= Chōkoku-no-Mori Station =

Railway station in Hakone, Kanagawa Prefecture, Japan

Coordinates: 35°14′47.30″N 139°3′2.97″E

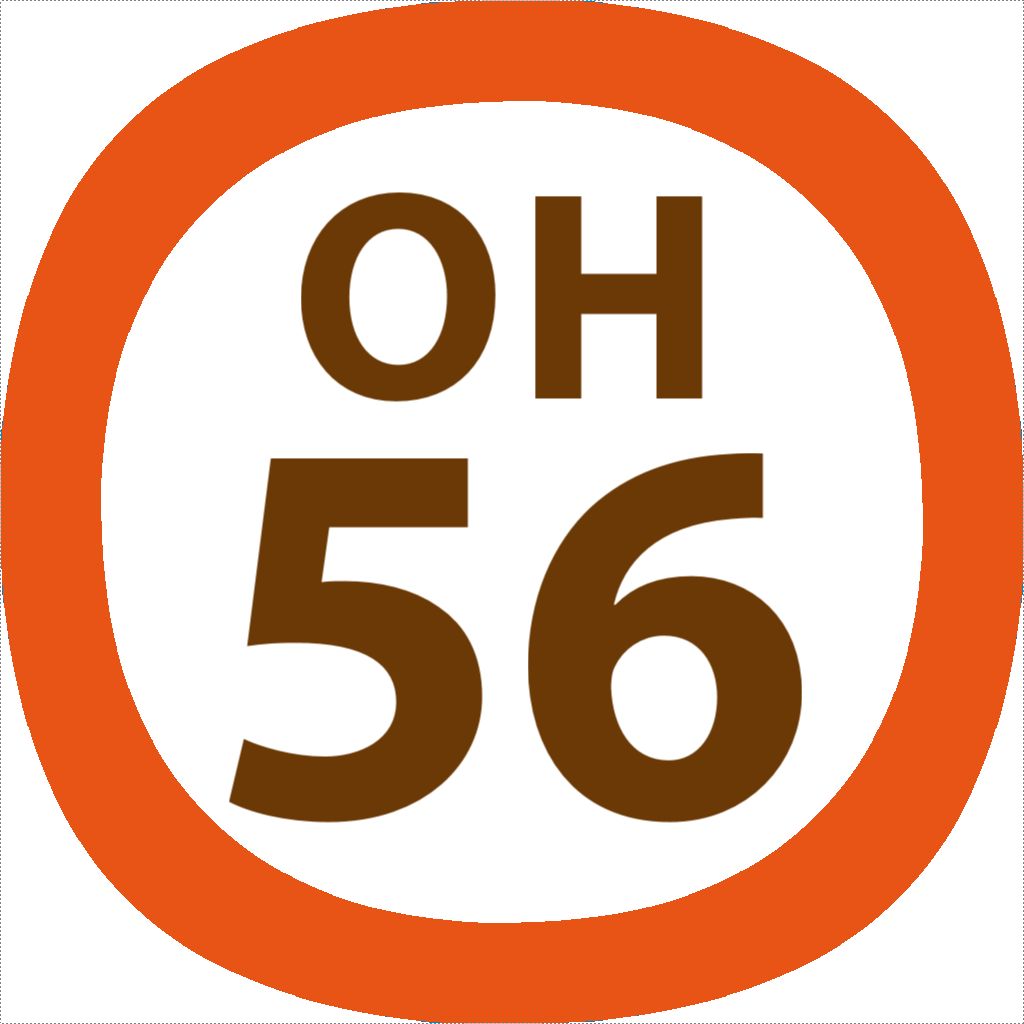
Chōkoku-no-mori Station 彫刻の森駅

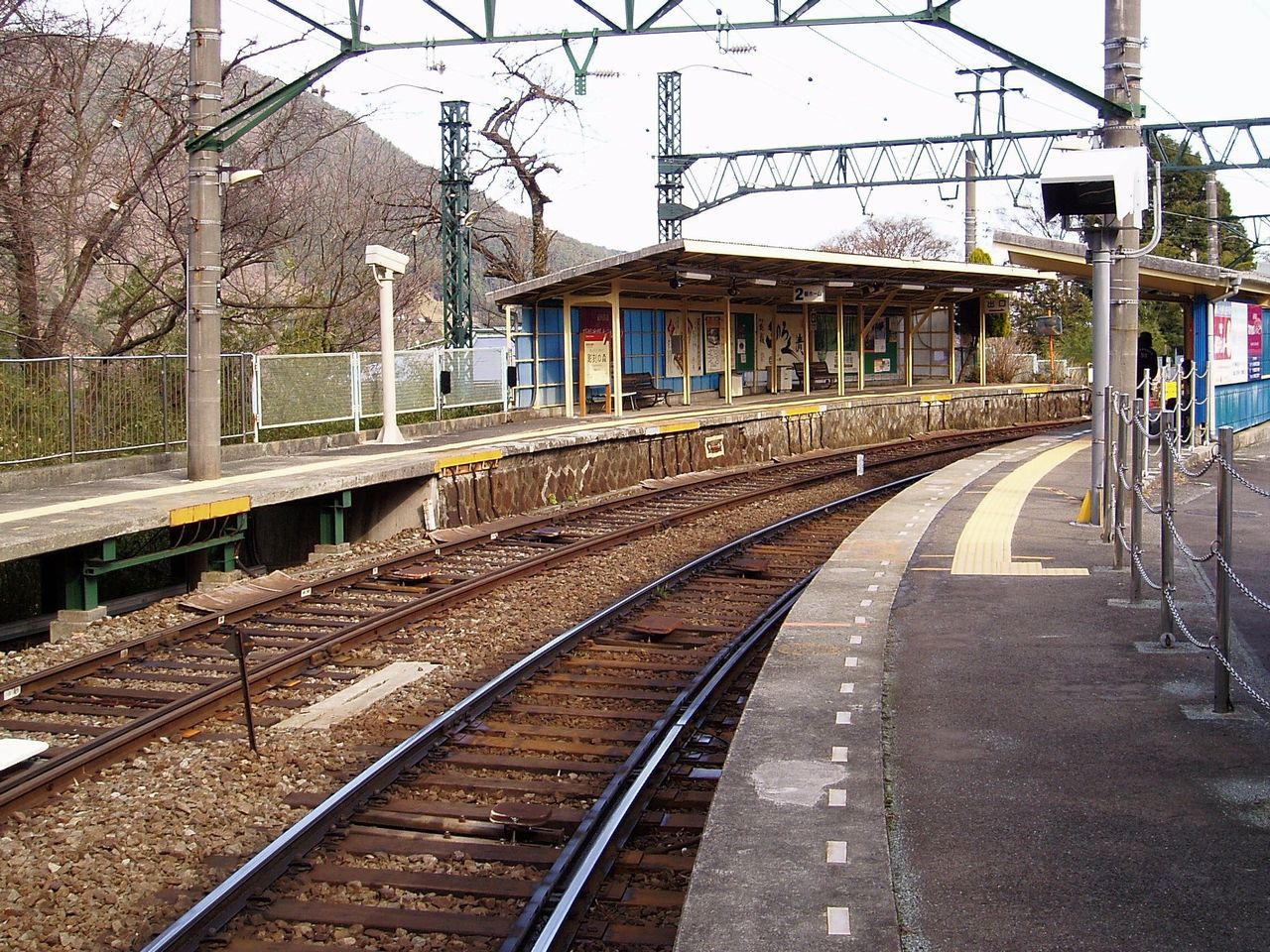
- Exterior of Chōkoku-no-mori Station

General information
- Location: Ni-no-Taira-aze, Kitabatake 1204-6, Hakone, Ashigarashimo, Kanagawa （神奈川県足柄下郡箱根町二ノ平字北畑１２０４－６） Japan
- Operator: Hakone Tozan Railway
- Line: Hakone Tozan Line
- Connections: Bus stop

History
- Opened: 1919
- Former names: Ni-no-Taira (until 1972)

Services
Preceding station	Odakyu Hakone	Following station
Gōra Terminus	Hakone Tozan Line	Kowakidani towards Hakone-Yumoto
Location

Chōkoku-no-mori Station (彫刻の森駅, Chōkokunomori-eki) is a railway station on the Hakone Tozan Line located in Hakone, Kanagawa Prefecture, Japan. It is 14.3 rail kilometers from the line's terminus at Odawara Station, named after Hakone Open-Air Museum.

== History ==
Chōkoku-no-mori Station was opened on June 1, 1919 as Ni-no-Taira Station (二ノ平駅, Ninotaira-eki). It was renamed to its present name on March 15, 1972 on the opening of the nearby Hakone Open-Air Museum of modern sculpture.

On 1 April 2024, operations of the station came under the aegis of Odakyu Hakone resulting from restructuring of Odakyu Group operations in the Hakone area.

== Lines ==
- Hakone Tozan Railway
  - Hakone Tozan Line

== Building ==
Chōkoku-no-mori Station has two opposed side platforms.

== Platforms ==
1	■ Hakone Tozan Line	Eastbound (For Hakone-Yumoto, Odawara) and Westbound (For Gōra)
2	■ Hakone Tozan Line	(closed)

== Bus services ==
- Hakone Tozan Bus
  - for Kowaki-en (transfer for Moto-Hakone (Lake Ashi) direction), Yunessun, and Ten-yu
  - for Hakone-Yumoto Station via Kowakidani Station, Miyanoshita, and Ohiradai Station
  - for Gora Station, Gora Park, Hakone Art Museum (Kōen-Kami Station), Pola Museum of Art, The Little Prince and Saint-Exupéry Museum, Senkyoro-mae (transfer for Togendai (Lake Ashi)), Hakone Venetian Glass Museum, Sengoku (transfer for JR Gotemba Station and Shinjuku Station), Lalique Museum, and Hakone Botanical Garden of Wetlands
  - for Gora Station, Miyagino (transfer for Togendai (Lake Ashi)), Hakone Venetian Glass Museum, Sengoku (transfer for Shinjuku Station), Otome Toge, Gotemba Premium Outlets, and JR Gotemba Station
