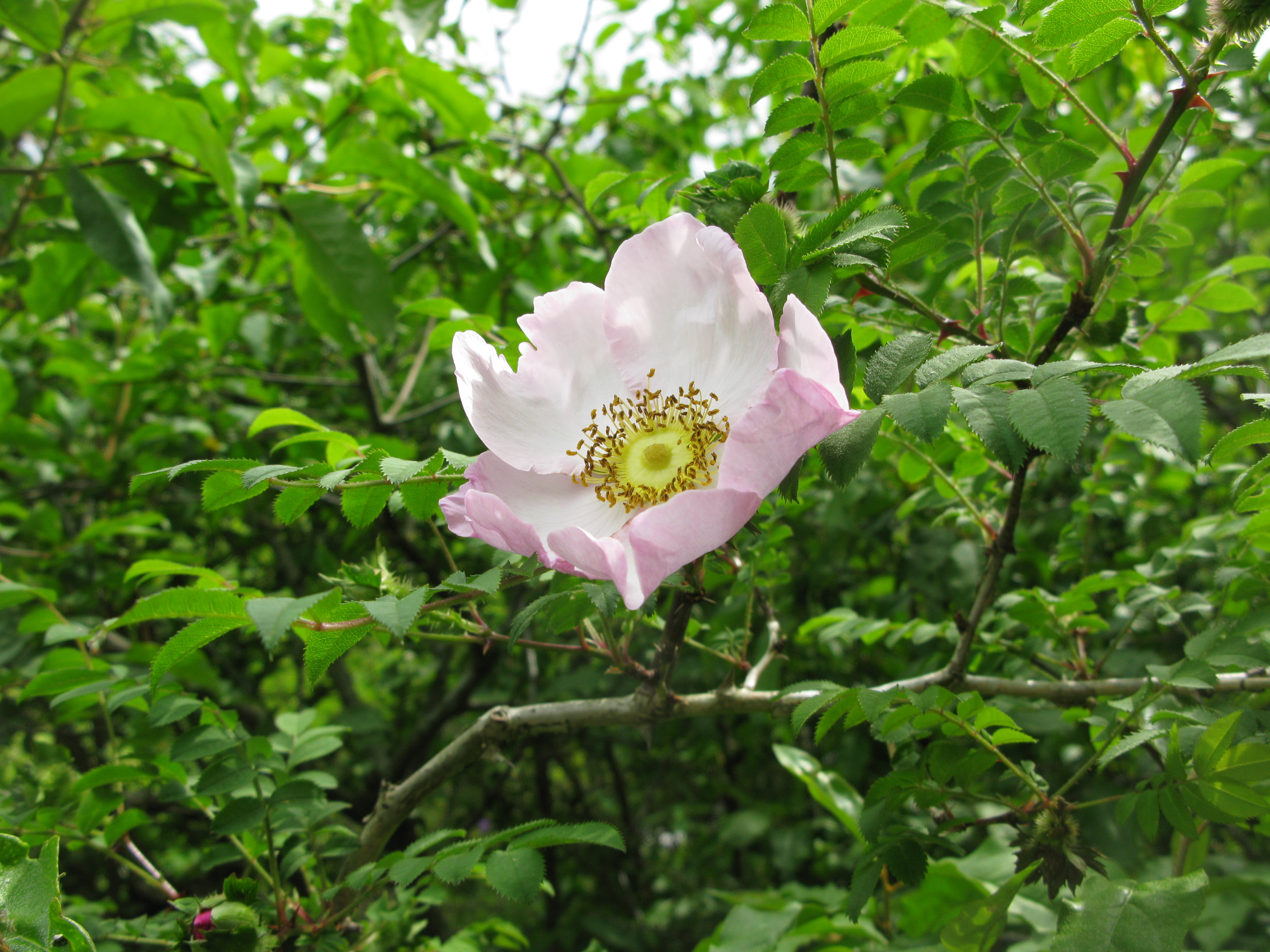
- At the Hakone Botanical Garden of Wetlands
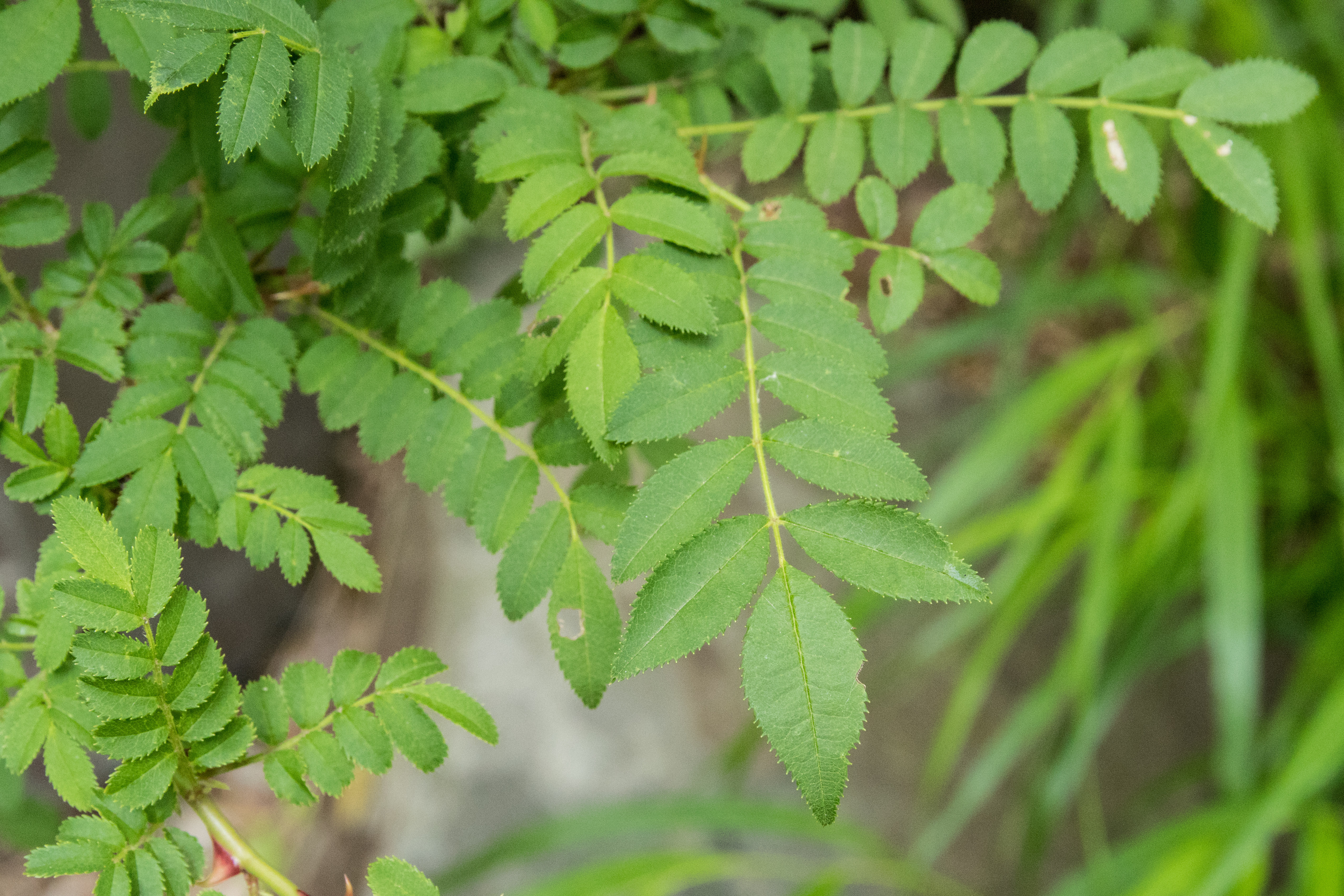
- Foliage

Scientific classification
- Kingdom: Plantae
- Clade: Embryophytes
- Clade: Tracheophytes
- Clade: Spermatophytes
- Clade: Angiosperms
- Clade: Eudicots
- Clade: Rosids
- Order: Rosales
- Family: Rosaceae
- Genus: Rosa
- Species: R. hirtula

Binomial name
- Rosa hirtula (Regel) Nakai

Synonyms
- Rosa microphylla var. hirtula Regel in Trudy Imp. S.-Peterburgsk. Bot. Sada 5: 322 (1878); Rosa roxburghii var. hirtula (Regel) Rehder & E.H.Wilson in C.S.Sargent, Pl. Wilson. 2: 320 (1915)

= Rosa hirtula =

Species of flowering plant

Rosa hirtula, the sanshou-bara or Hakone rose, is a species of flowering plant in the family Rosaceae. It is found only in the vicinity of Mount Fuji and neighboring Mount Hakone in Japan, and is the town flower of Hakone.

The pale pink, single flowers can be as wide as 7.5 cm (3 in). Quite unusually for a rose, it can take on a tree-like growth form, and reach up to 6 m (20 ft) tall. It has 4-9 pairs of leaves, the leaflets are each 1 to 3 cm (0.4 to 1.2 in) long. It flowers between May and June.

The causal fungus of a rust disease of Rosa hirtula was thought to be a common species Phragmidium rosae-multiflorae. After a study in 2019, it was concluded that it was a species distinct from P. rosae-multiflorae; and a new name, Phragmidium satoanum, was proposed for it.

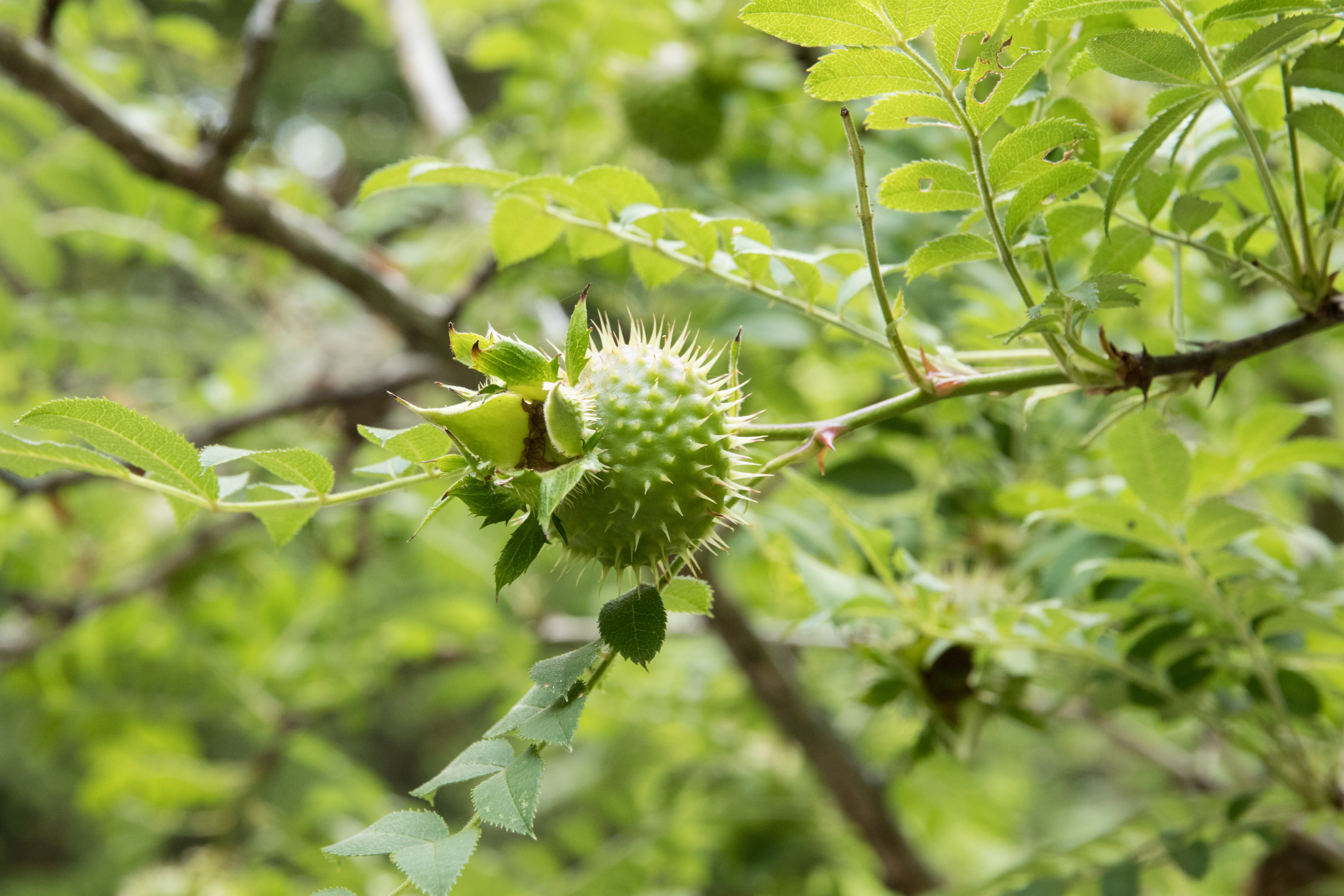
Unripe hip

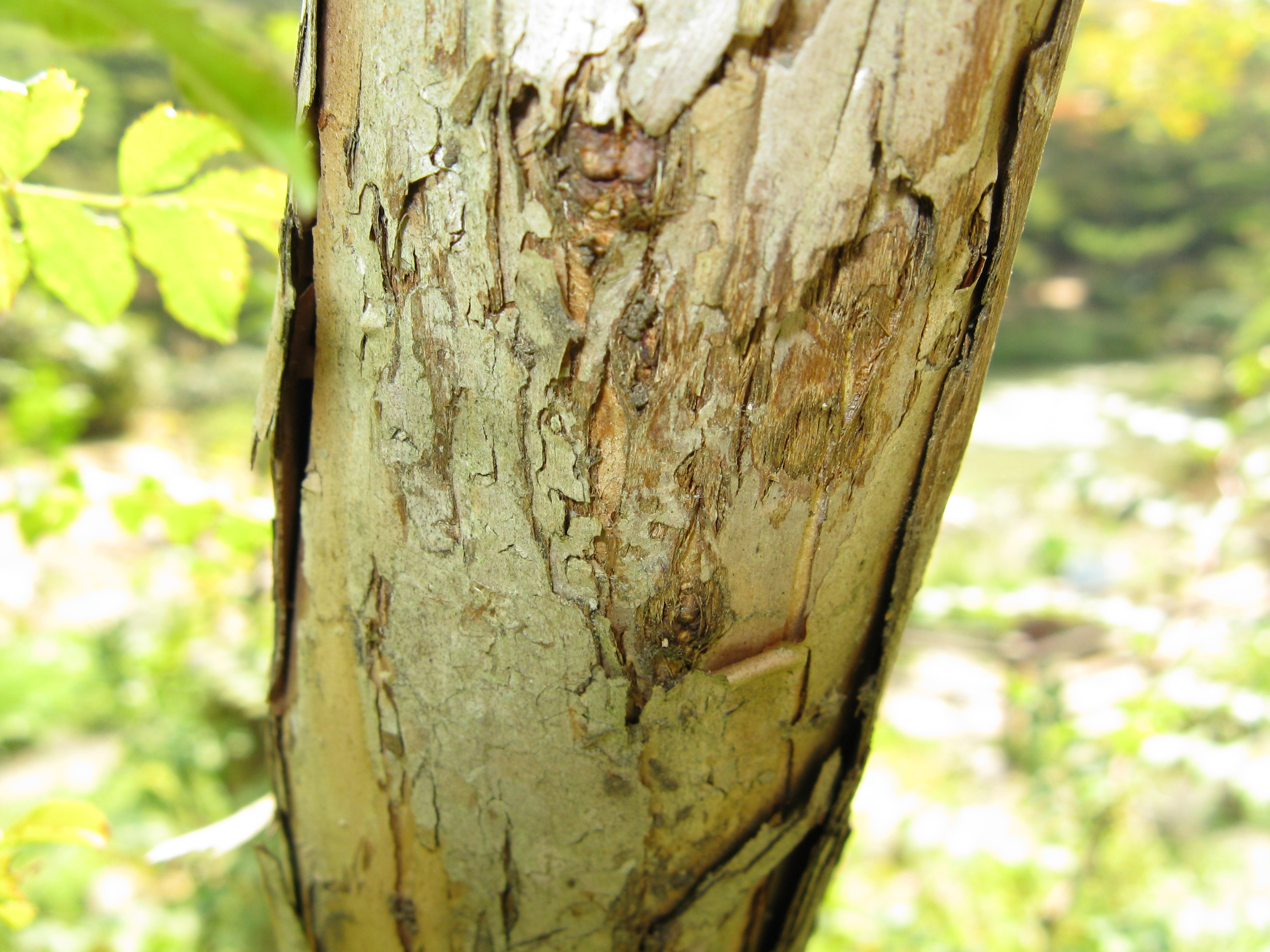
Bark tends to peel.

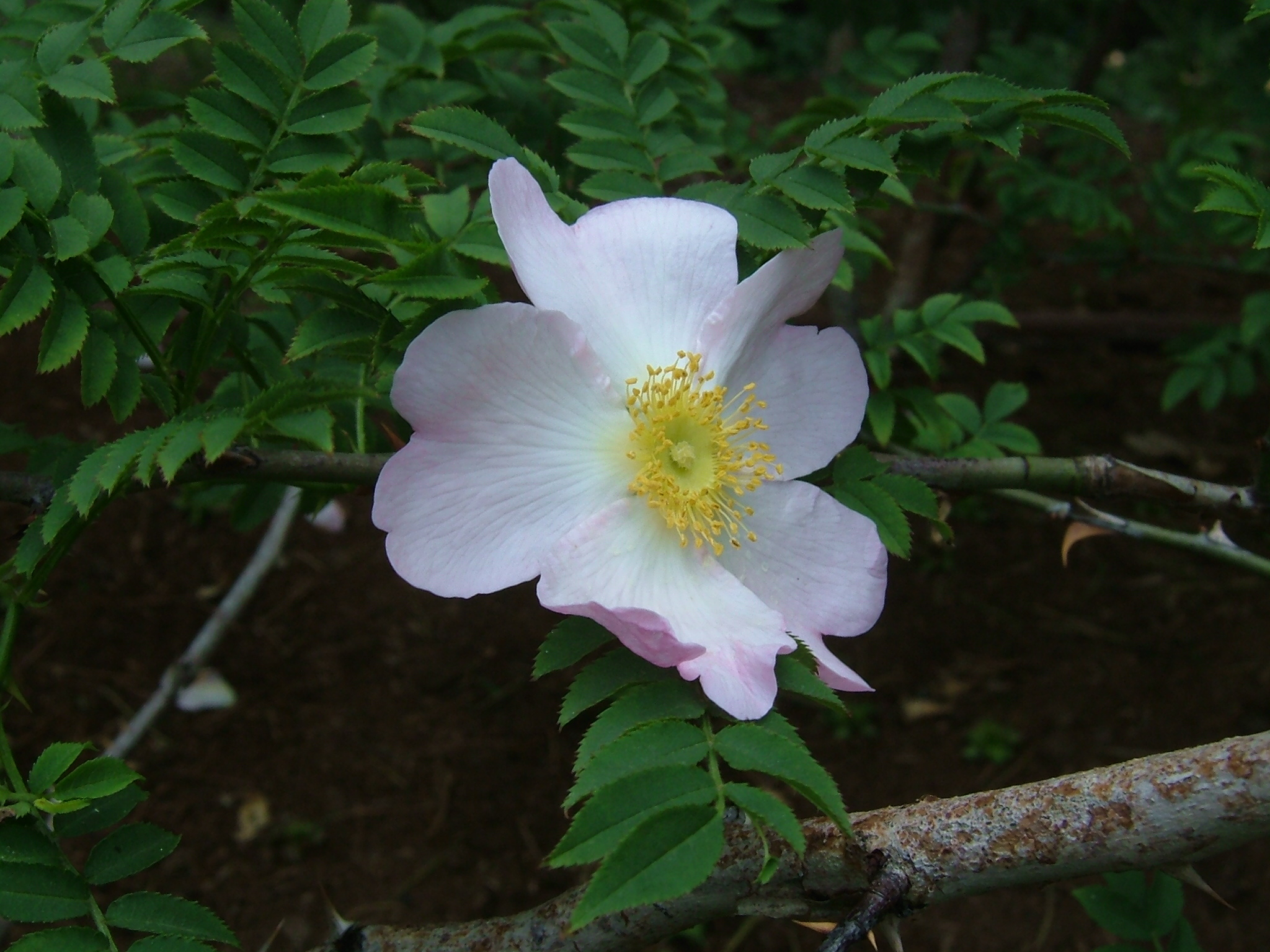
Detail of petal venation and anthers
