= Hakone =

Hakone Town 箱根町 Hakone-machi
- Town
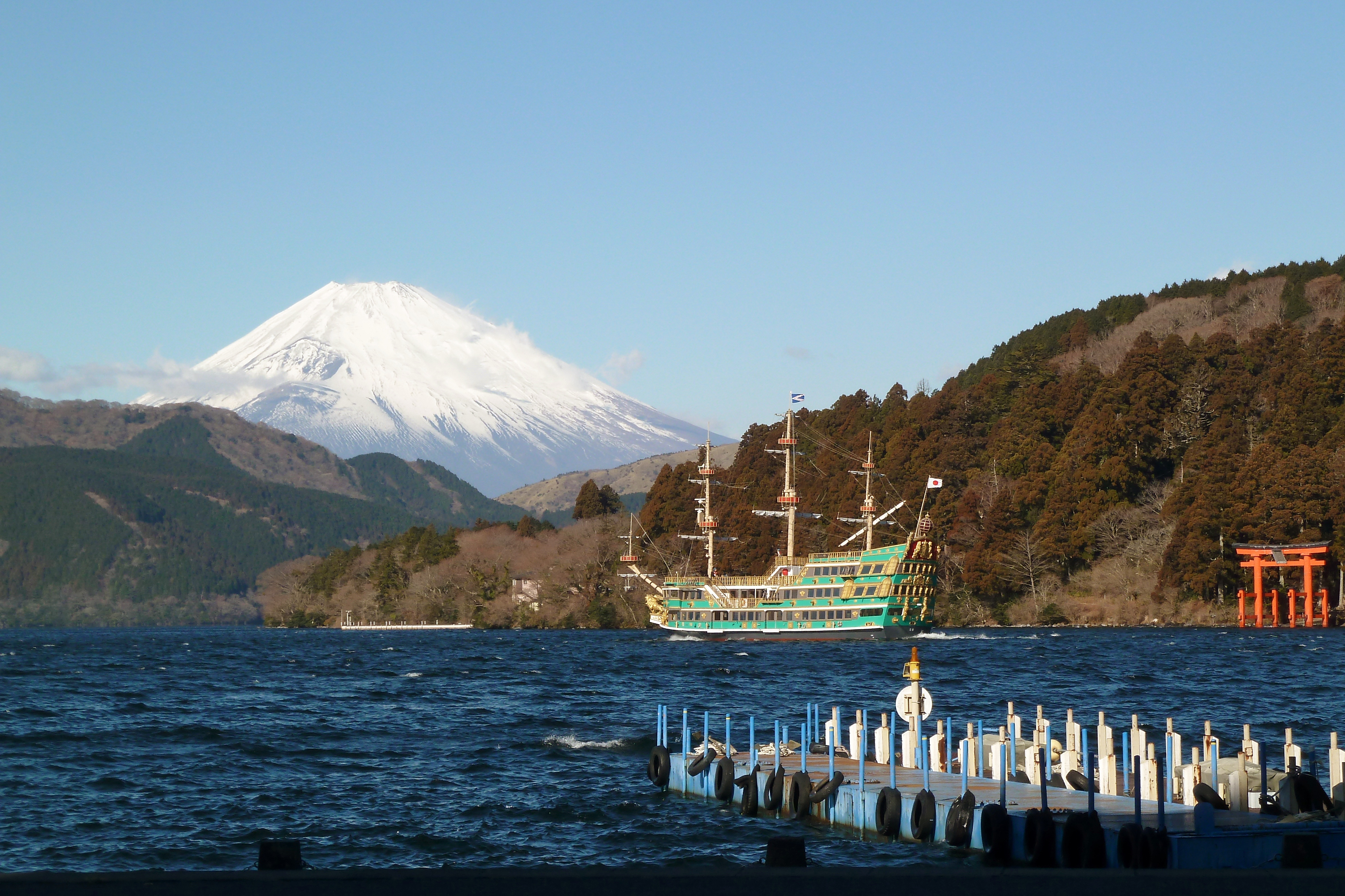
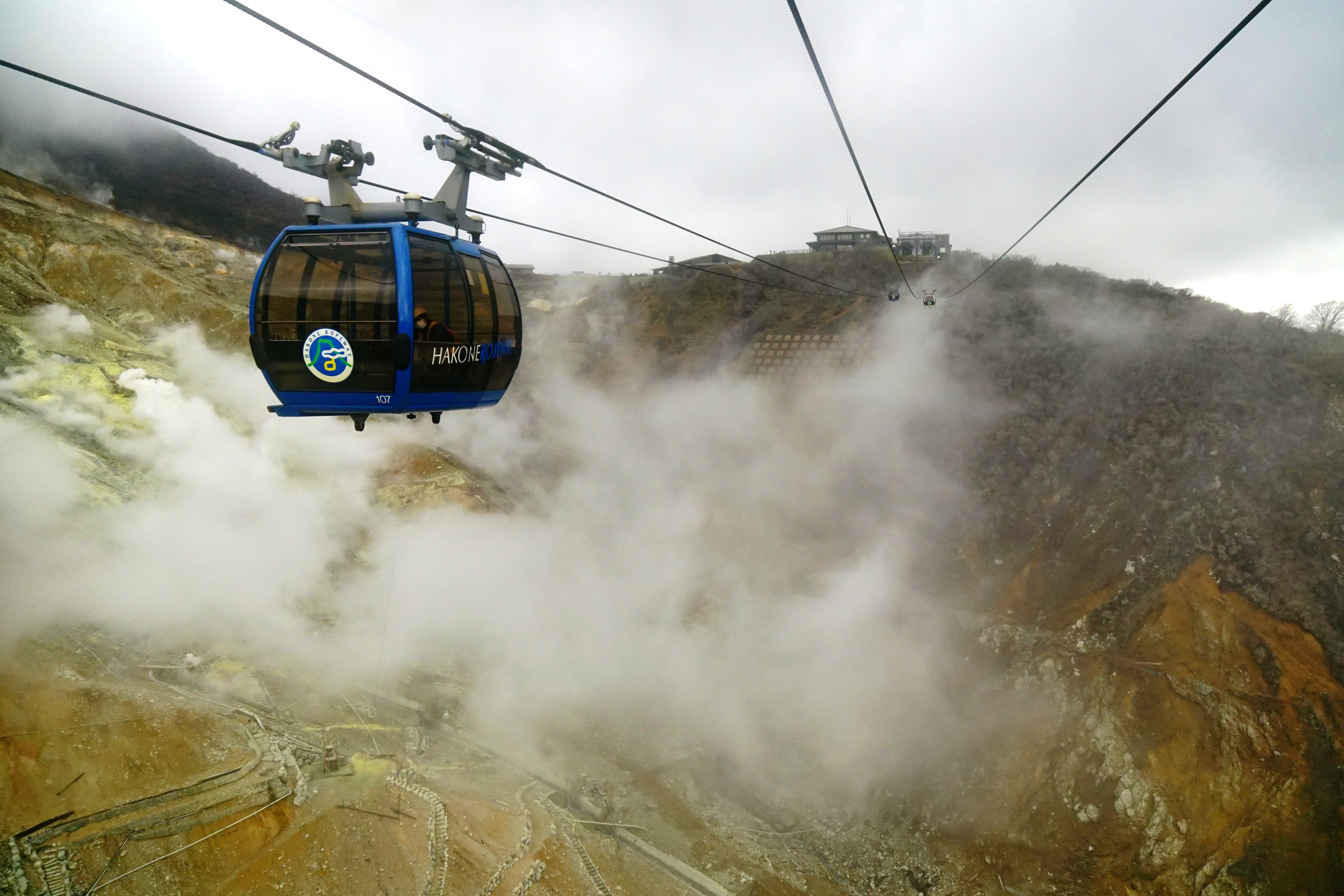
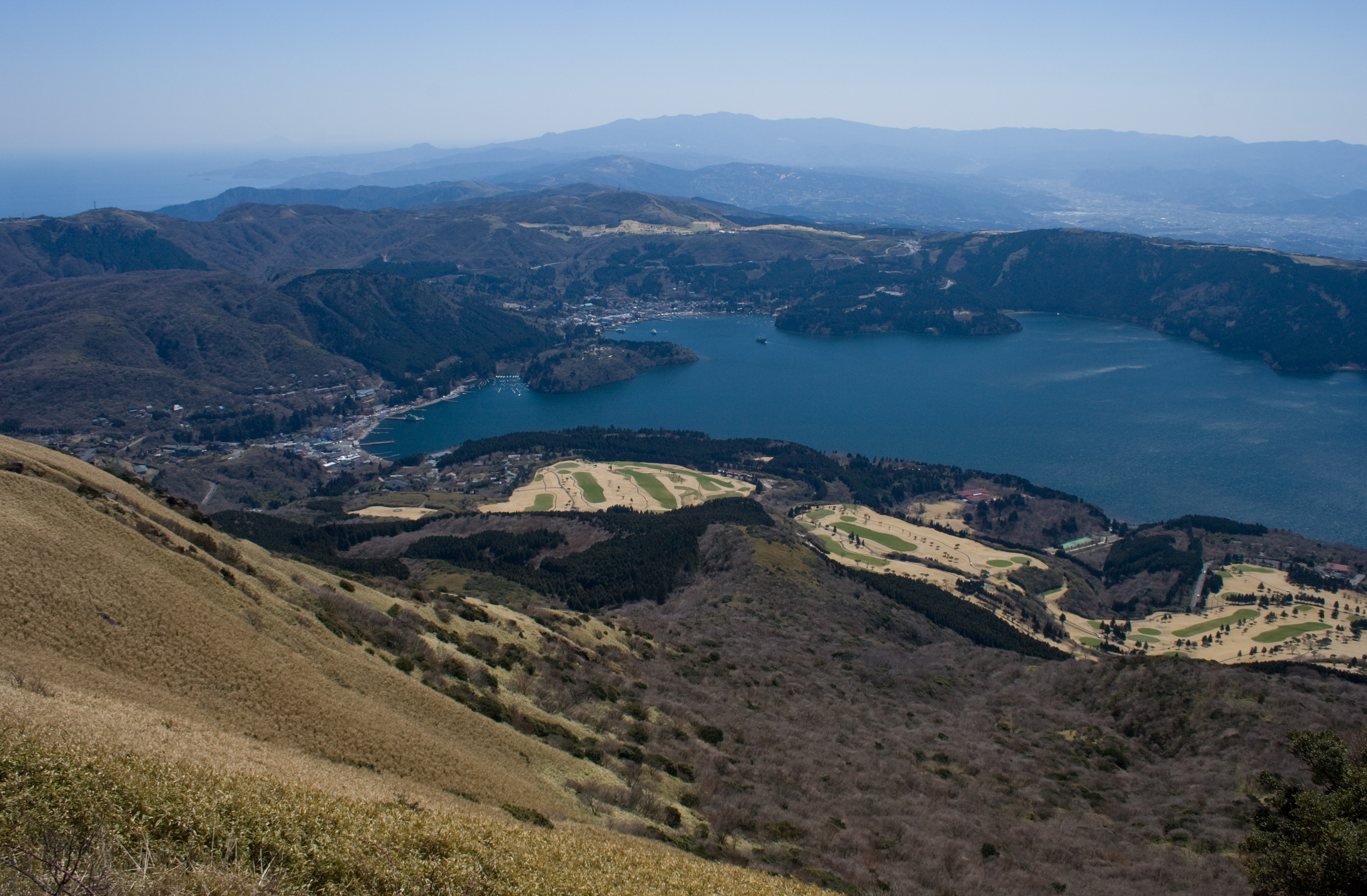
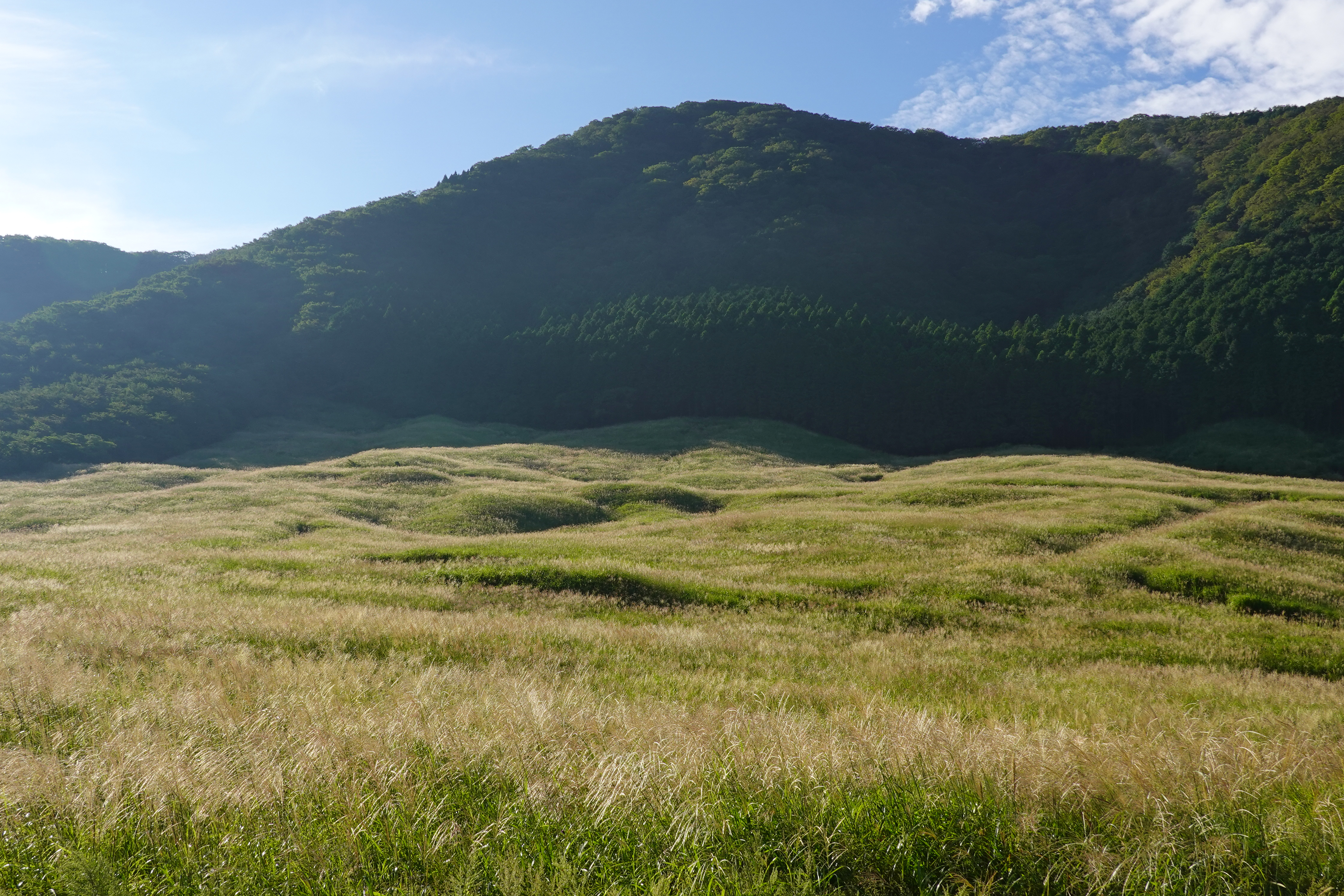
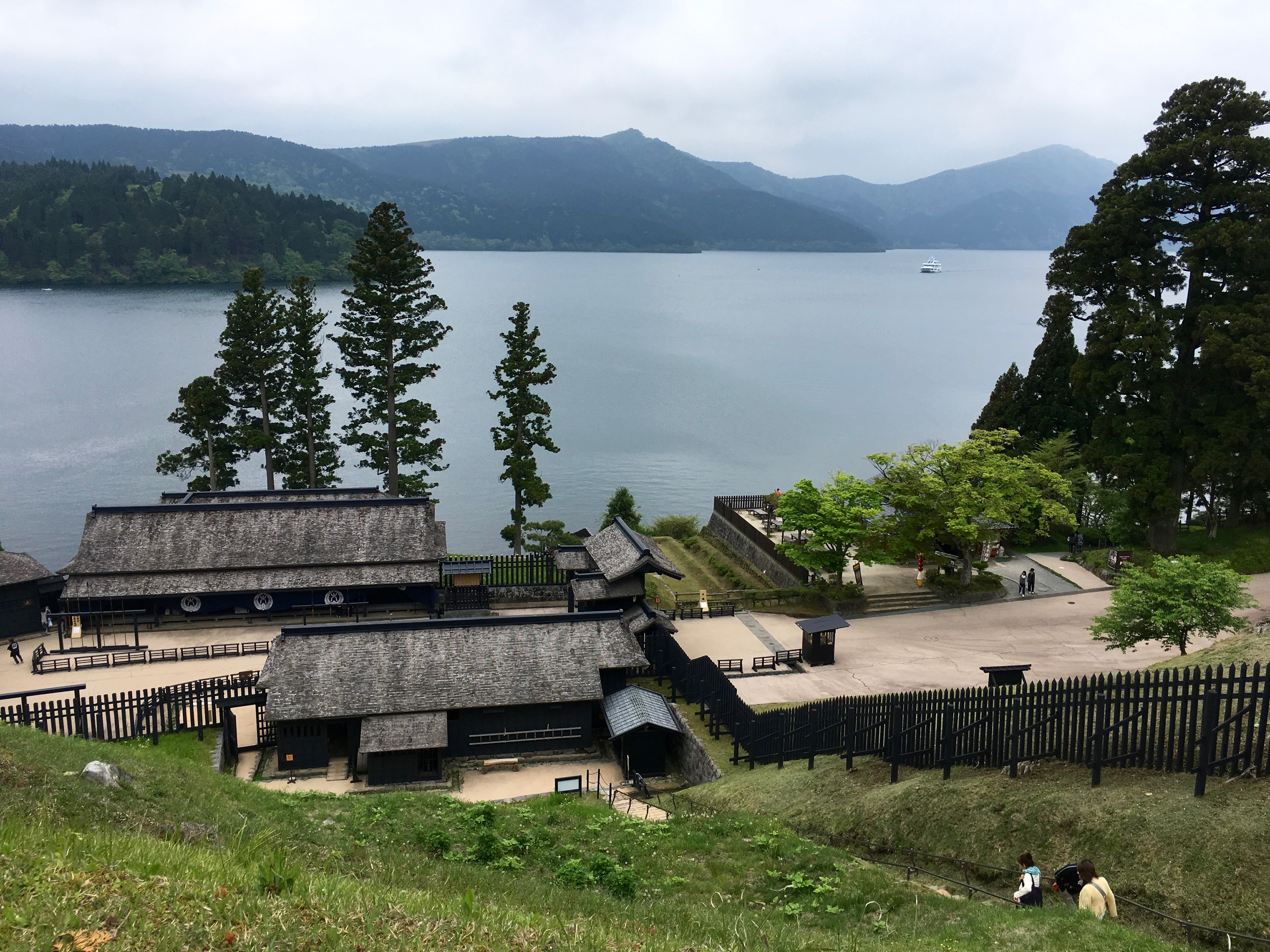
- Mount Fuji seen from Lake Ashi Owakudani and Hakone Yumoto cable car View of Lake Ashi and Hakone Town from Mount Hakone Komagatake Miscanthus sinensis in Sengokuhara Lake Ashi and Hakone Checkpoint

- Flag Seal
- Interactive map of Hakone Town
- Hakone Town (Kanto Area) Hakone Town (Kanagawa Prefecture)
- Coordinates: 35°11′22″N 139°01′29″E
- Country: Japan
- Region: Kantō
- Prefecture: Kanagawa
- District: Ashigarashimo
- First official recorded: 5th century BC (official)
- Town settled: October 29, 1892

Government
  - Mayor: Hiroyuki Katsumata (from November 2020)

Area
  - Total: 92.82 km^{2} (35.84 sq mi)

Population (April 1, 2021)
  - Total: 10,837
  - Density: 116.8/km^{2} (302.4/sq mi)
- Time zone: UTC+9 (Japan Standard Time)
  - Tree: Yamazakura (Prunus jamasakura)
  - Flower: Hakonebara (Rosa hirtula)
  - Bird: Woodpecker
- Phone number: 0460-85-7111
- Address: 256 Yumoto, Hakone-machi, Ashigarashimo-gun, Kanagawa-ken 250-0398
- Website: Official website

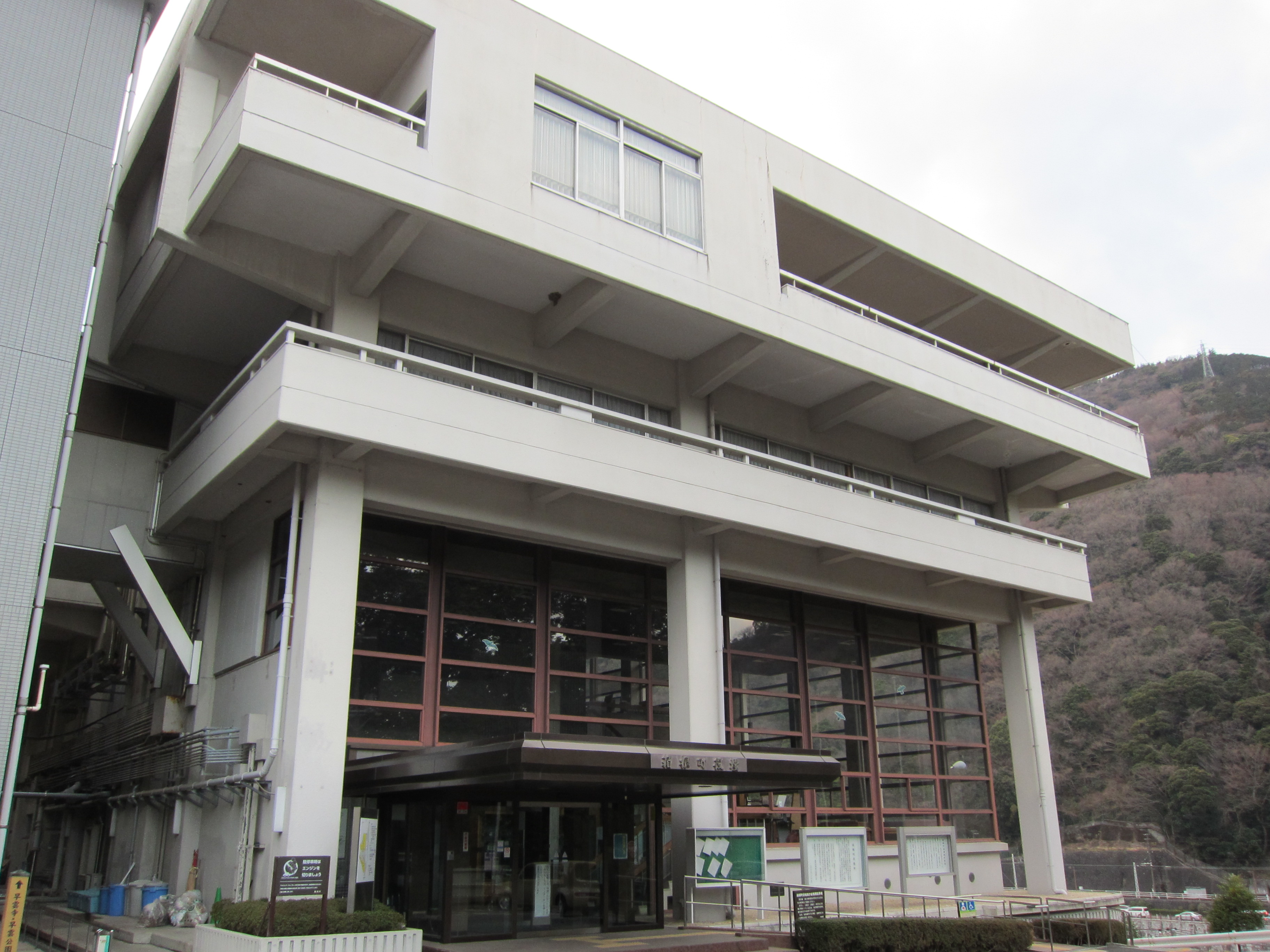
Hakone Town Hall

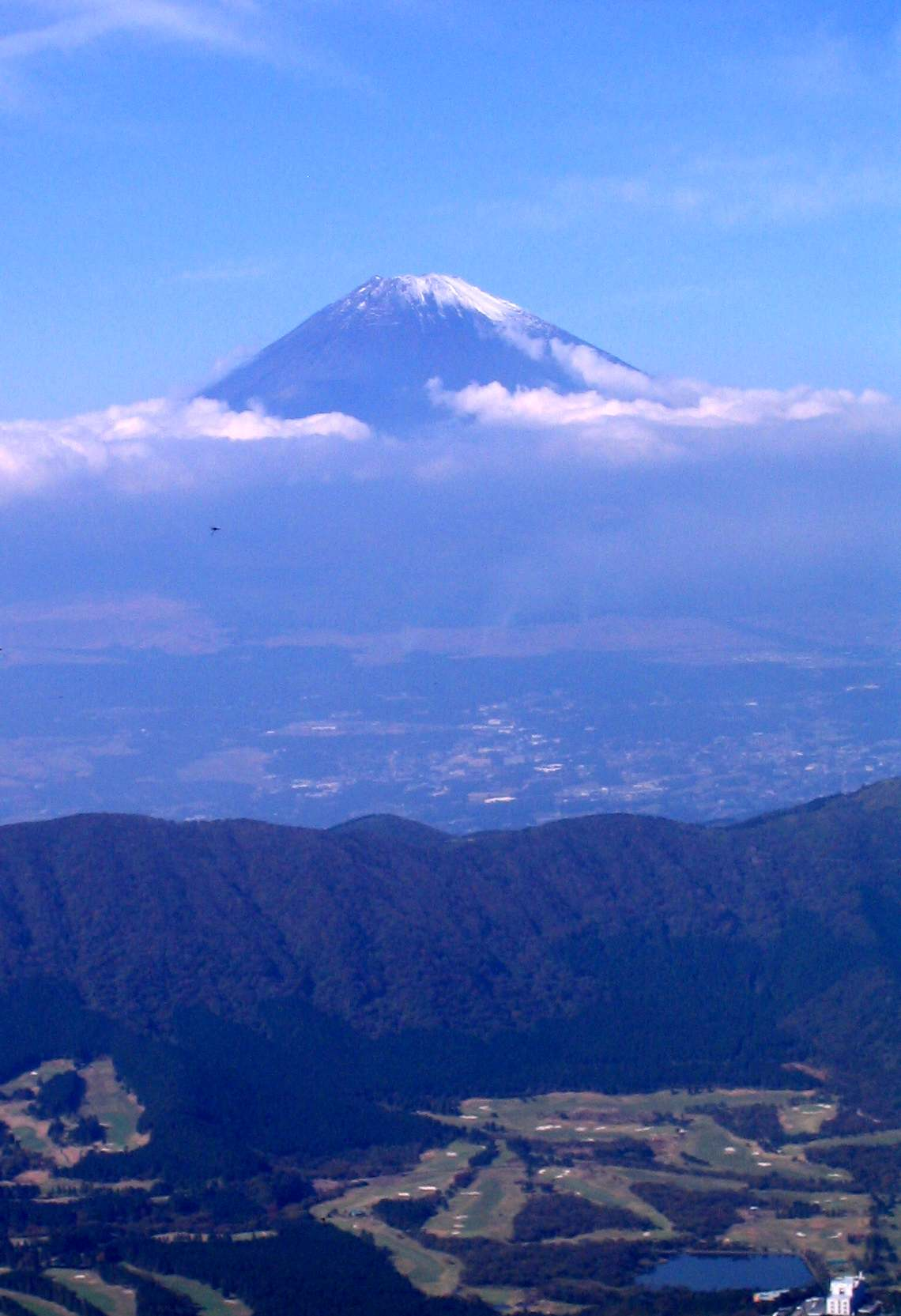
Mount Fuji from Mount Kami in the Fuji-Hakone-Izu National Park

Hakone (Japanese: 箱根, Hakone, pronounced [hakone]) is a town in Kanagawa Prefecture, Japan. As of 1 October 2023, the town had a population of 10,965, and total area of 92.82 km^{2} (35.84 sq mi).

Hakone is a notable spa town and a popular tourist destination due to its many hot springs being within view of nearby Mount Fuji, the most visited mountain in Japan.

== Geography ==
Hakone is located in the mountains in the far west of the prefecture, on the eastern side of Hakone Pass. Most of the town is within the borders of the volcanically active Fuji-Hakone-Izu National Park, centered on Lake Ashi.

=== Surrounding municipalities ===
Kanagawa Prefecture

- Minami-ashigara
- Odawara
- Yugawara

Shizuoka Prefecture

- Gotemba
- Kannami
- Mishima
- Oyama
- Susono

=== Climate ===
Hakone has a humid subtropical climate (Köppen Cfa) characterized by warm summers and cool winters with light to no snowfall. The average annual temperature in Hakone is 13.3 °C. The average annual rainfall is 2221 mm with September as the wettest month. The temperatures are highest on average in August, at around 24.0 °C, and lowest in January, at around 2.9 °C.

Climate data for Hakone
Month	Jan	Feb	Mar	Apr	May	Jun	Jul	Aug	Sep	Oct	Nov	Dec	Year
Mean daily maximum °C (°F)	6.4 (43.5)	7.1 (44.8)	10.7 (51.3)	15.4 (59.7)	19.8 (67.6)	22.6 (72.7)	26.5 (79.7)	27.4 (81.3)	24.1 (75.4)	19.0 (66.2)	14.0 (57.2)	9.0 (48.2)	16.8 (62.3)
Daily mean °C (°F)	2.9 (37.2)	3.3 (37.9)	6.5 (43.7)	11.2 (52.2)	15.7 (60.3)	19.2 (66.6)	23.2 (73.8)	24.0 (75.2)	21.0 (69.8)	15.9 (60.6)	10.6 (51.1)	5.5 (41.9)	13.3 (55.9)
Mean daily minimum °C (°F)	−0.2 (31.6)	0.1 (32.2)	2.9 (37.2)	7.5 (45.5)	12.2 (54.0)	16.5 (61.7)	20.6 (69.1)	21.5 (70.7)	18.5 (65.3)	13.3 (55.9)	7.5 (45.5)	2.6 (36.7)	10.2 (50.4)
Average precipitation mm (inches)	101 (4.0)	118 (4.6)	183 (7.2)	183 (7.2)	193 (7.6)	246 (9.7)	226 (8.9)	201 (7.9)	278 (10.9)	256 (10.1)	144 (5.7)	92 (3.6)	2,221 (87.4)
Average relative humidity (%)	70	73	73	77	81	86	87	85	84	82	80	73	79

== Demographics ==
Per Japanese census data, the population of Hakone peaked around the year 1970 and has declined since.

Historical population
Year	Pop.	±%
1920	8,379	—
1930	9,012	+7.6%
1940	10,673	+18.4%
1950	14,498	+35.8%
1960	20,972	+44.7%
1970	21,299	+1.6%
1980	19,882	−6.7%
1990	19,365	−2.6%
2000	15,829	−18.3%
2010	13,850	−12.5%
2020	11,293	−18.5%

== History ==
Hakone is the location of the Hakone Gongen, a noted Shinto shrine which is mentioned in Heian period literature. During the Genpei War, after his defeat at the Battle of Ishibashiyama in neighboring Manuzuru, Minamoto no Yoritomo prayed at this shrine for victory over his enemies.

As with the rest of Sagami Province, the area came under the control of the later Hōjō clan of Odawara during the Sengoku period. After the start of the Edo period, Hakone-juku was a post station on the Tōkaidō highway connecting Edo with Kyoto. It was also the site of a major barrier and official checkpoint on the route known as the Hakone Checkpoint (ja:箱根関, Hakone sekisho), which formed the border of the Kantō region. Under the Tokugawa shogunate, all travellers entering and leaving Edo along the Tōkaidō were stopped here by officials and their travel permits and baggage were examined to enforce Tokugawa laws that restricted the travel of women and weapons.

After the start of the Meiji Restoration, Hakone became a part of the short-lived Ashigara Prefecture before becoming part of Ashigarashimo District in Kanagawa prefecture in August 1876. Hakone attained town status in 1889. The imperial household established the summer Hakone Imperial Villa close to the lake. During the Meiji period, the area developed into a summer resort for the wealthy of Tokyo and the foreign settlement in Yokohama.

After a merger with five neighboring towns and villages in September 1956, it reached its present boundaries.

== Government ==
Hakone has a mayor-council form of government with a directly elected mayor and a unicameral town council of 14 members. Hakone, together with neighboring Manazuru and Yugawara, contributes one member to the Kanagawa Prefectural Assembly. In terms of national politics, the town is part of Kanagawa 16th district of the lower house of the Diet of Japan.

== Economy ==
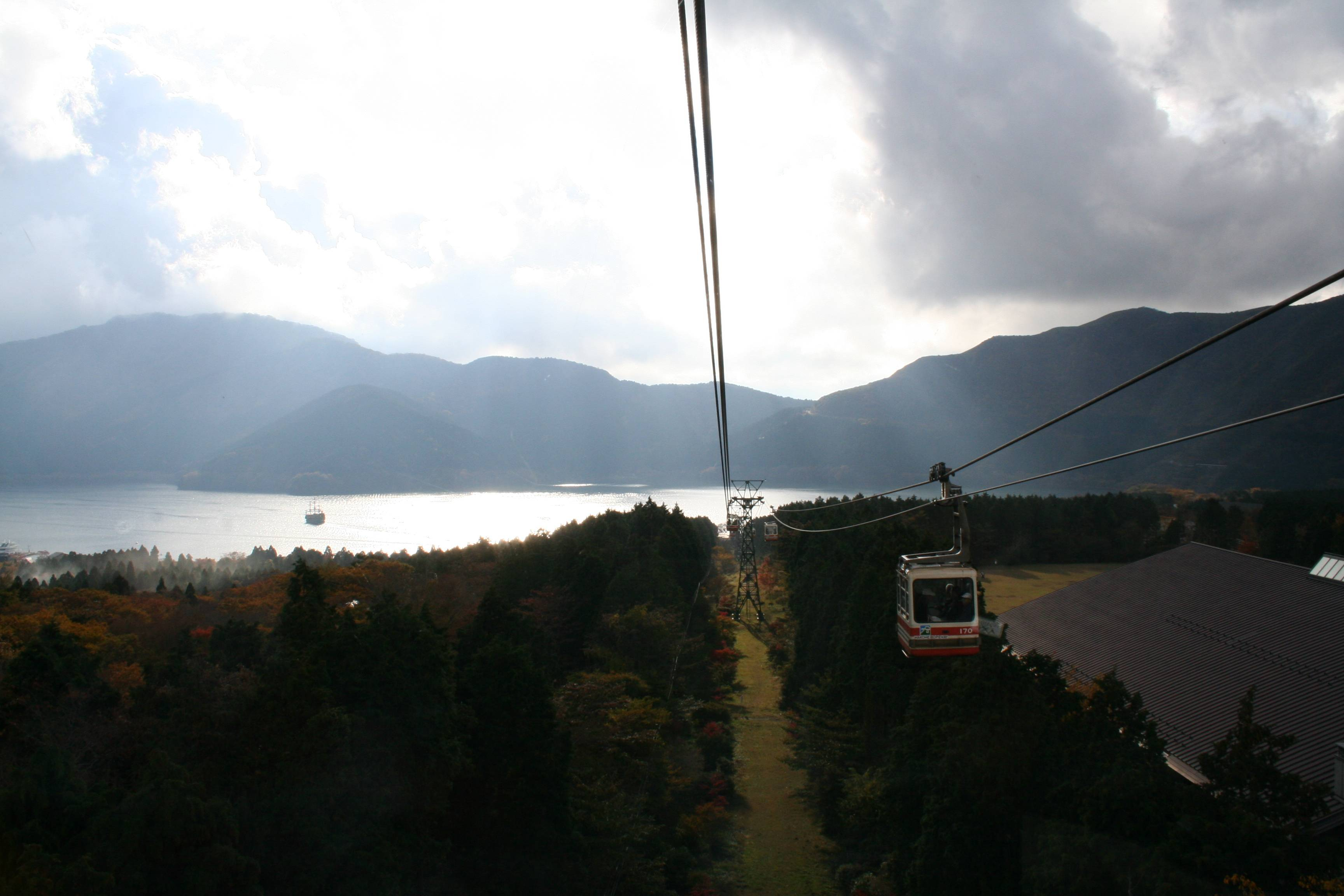
Lake Ashi from Hakone Ropeway, a major tourist attraction in Hakone

The economy of Hakone is strongly dominated by the tourist industry. Hakone is noted for its onsen hot spring resorts, which attract both Japanese and international visitors, due to its proximity to the greater Tokyo metropolis and to Mount Fuji. Sights include the volcanically active Ōwakudani fumaroles and Hakone Shrine on the shore of the lake, as well as the Hakone Botanical Garden of Wetlands. In April the cherry blossoms (sakura) and in autumn the Miscanthus sinensis (susuki) are noted sights.

Hakone has a number of art museums, including the Hakone Open-Air Museum and Pola Museum of Art.

Major events include the annual JLPGA CAT Ladies Golf tournament and the Hakone Ekiden, a long distance collegiate foot race, held at the New Year, which runs from Tokyo to Hakone and back over two days, partly in commemoration of the couriers who ran the Tōkaidō road.

One famous hotel in Hakone is the historic Fujiya Hotel in Miyanoshita, which was patronized by noted literary figures, politicians and foreign dignitaries in the Meiji, Taishō, and early Shōwa eras.

A noted local handicraft is a kind of marquetry called Yosegi.

Hakone is also well known among anime fans for being the main location in the manga and anime series Neon Genesis Evangelion, in which it has been renamed Tokyo-3, and there are numerous attractions related to the franchise offered in the town. In 2017, Hakone was included as one of 88 anime pilgrimage sites for 2018 by the Anime Tourism Association. In 2020, new decorations were introduced to the city in the anticipation of the release of the final film of the Rebuild of Evangelion tetralogy.

== Education ==
Hakone has three public elementary schools and one public middle school operated by the town government. The town does not have a public high school. There are also two private elementary schools, one private middle school, and one private high school. (Kanrei Shirayuri Gakuen Junior/Senior High School). The private Seisa University also has a campus in Hakone.

== Transportation ==
=== Railway ===
Odawara and Mishima, the terminus of the Odakyū Odawara Line, 70 minutes from Shinjuku, Tokyo. From Odawara, the Hakone Tozan Line continues into various resort towns in Hakone. Odakyu also runs the Romancecar limited express between Shinjuku and Hakone-Yumoto. From Gōra, the terminus of Hakone Tozan Line, the Hakone Tozan Cable Car funicular goes to Sōunzan. Ōwakudani can be reached by Hakone Ropeway from Sounzan and the lake, while the lake is crisscrossed by cartoonishly decorated "pirate" ships for tourists. There is also Hakone Komagatake Ropeway, which goes to the top of Mount Komagatake. A popular "Hakone Free Pass", allowing unlimited use of most forms of transport for several days, is available. Hakone Free Pass can be bought at Shinjuku Station, Odawara Station, any other chief station along Odakyū Odawara Line, Hakone-Yumoto Station, Gōra Station, any other chief station along Hakone Tozan Line, Sōunzan Station, Tōgendai Station, Sengoku-Annaijo Bus Stop, Moto-Hakone Port, Hakone-Machi Port, and JR Gotemba Station Bus Information.

- Hakone Tozan Railway
  - Hakone-Yumoto – Tōnosawa – Ōhiradai – Miyanoshita – Kowakidani – Chōkoku-no-Mori – Gōra
- Hakone Tozan Cable Car
  - Gōra – Kōen-Shimo – Kōen-Kami – Naka-Gōra – Kami-Gōra – Sōunzan
- Hakone Ropeway
  - Sōunzan – Ōwakudani – Ubako – Tōgendai

=== Highways ===
- Hakone Shindō
- National Route 1
- National Route 138
- Hakone Turnpike
- Ashinoko Skyline

== Sister cities ==
- (Japan) Tōyako, Hokkaido, since July 4, 1964
- Jasper, Alberta, Canada, since July 4, 1972
- Taupō, New Zealand, since October 7, 1987
- St. Moritz, Switzerland, friendship city since November 2, 2014

== Tourist attractions ==
Hakone Town's tourist attractions include: Lake Ashi, the Hakone Barrier, the Hakone Shrine, the Hakone Resort Complex, the Hakone Botanical Garden of Wetlands, the Hakone Venetian Glass Museum and many others.

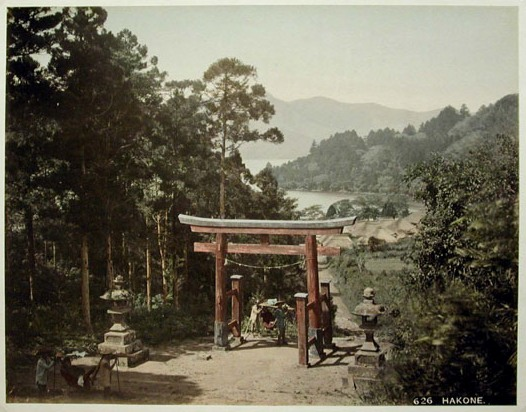
Hakone, hand-colored print 1860–1900

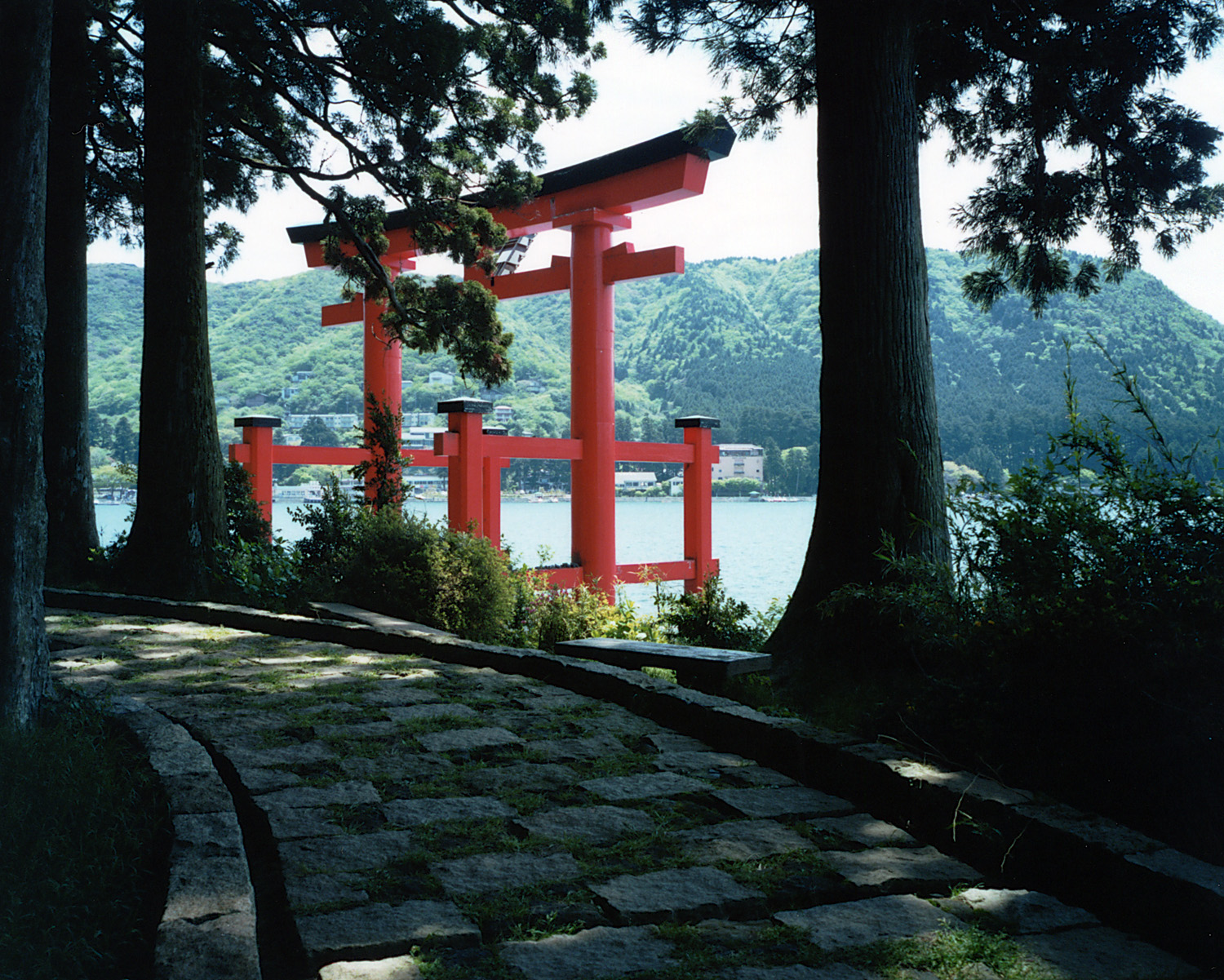
Torii of the shrine in Hakone, at Lake Ashi

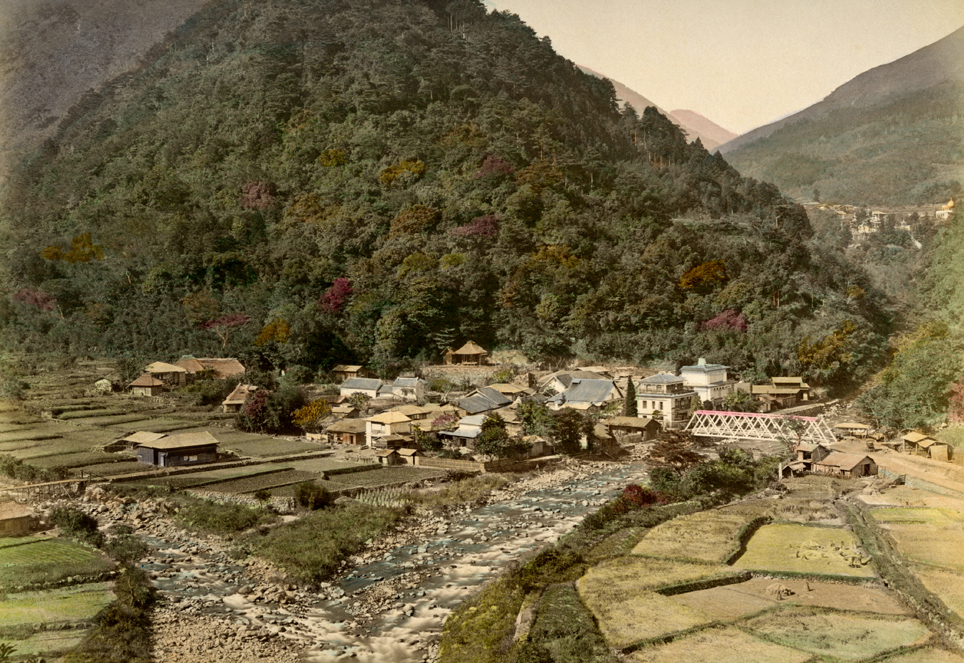
Yumoto Onsen, Meiji era

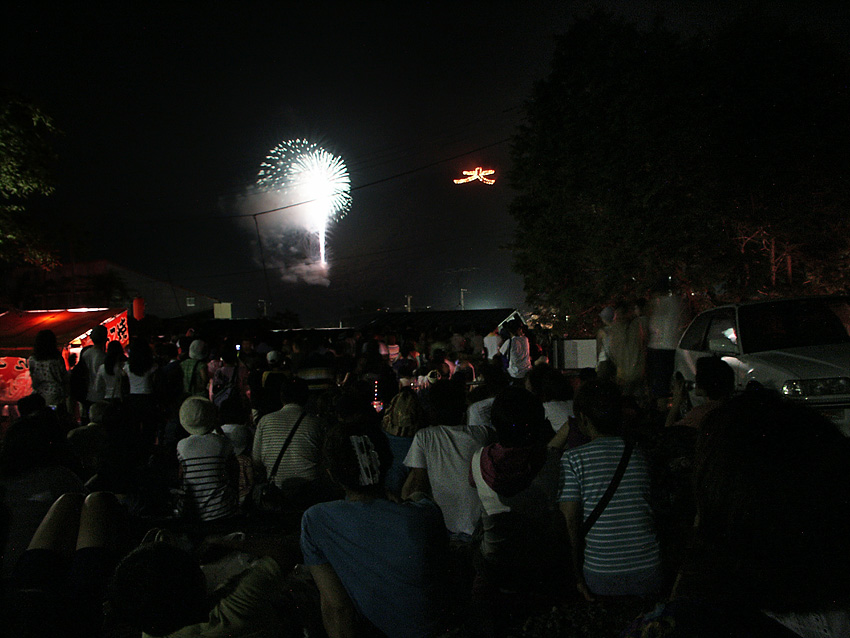
The summer festival in Hakone includes a bonfire in the shape of the kanji 大 (dai) and fireworks

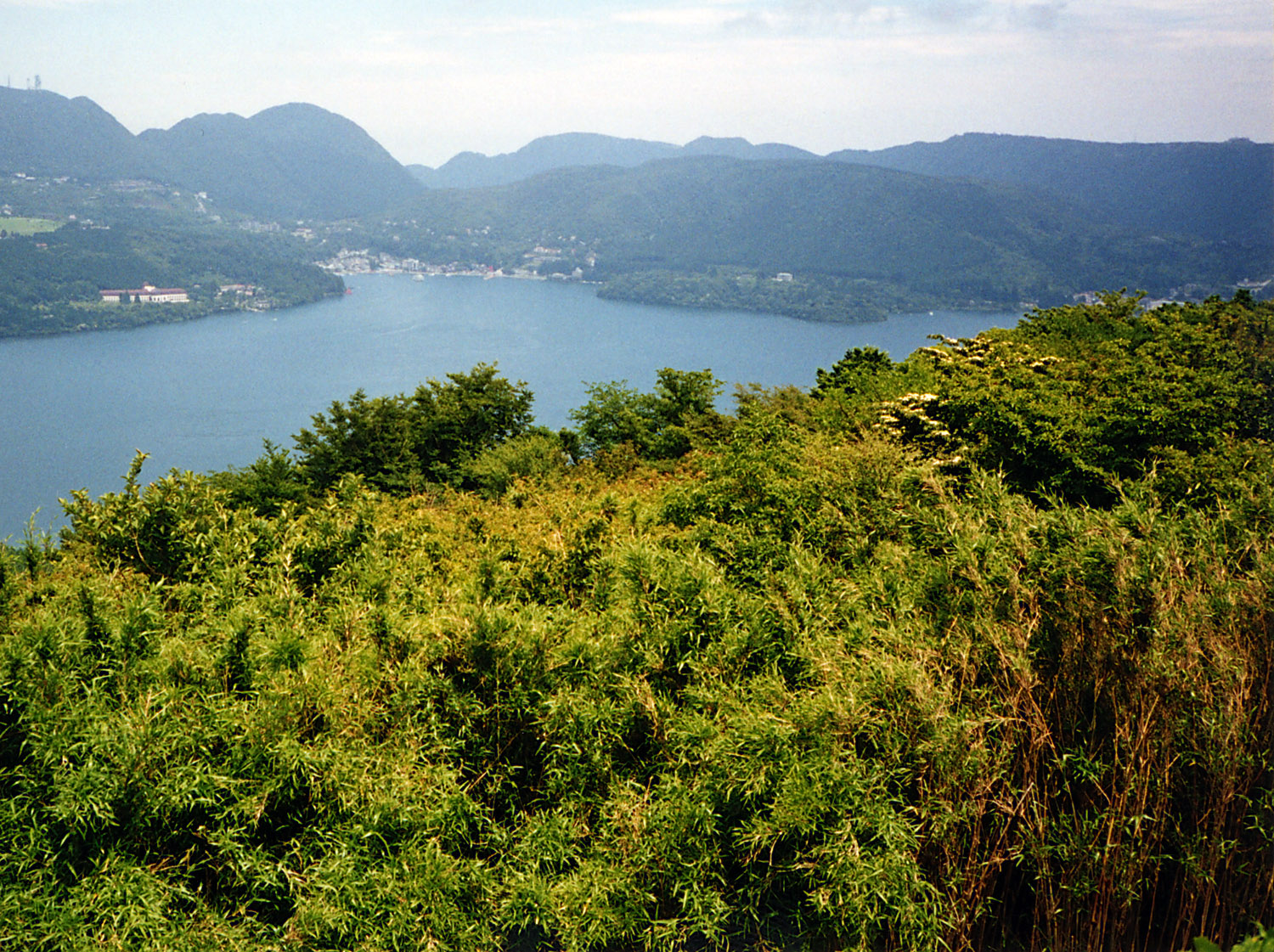
Lake Ashi

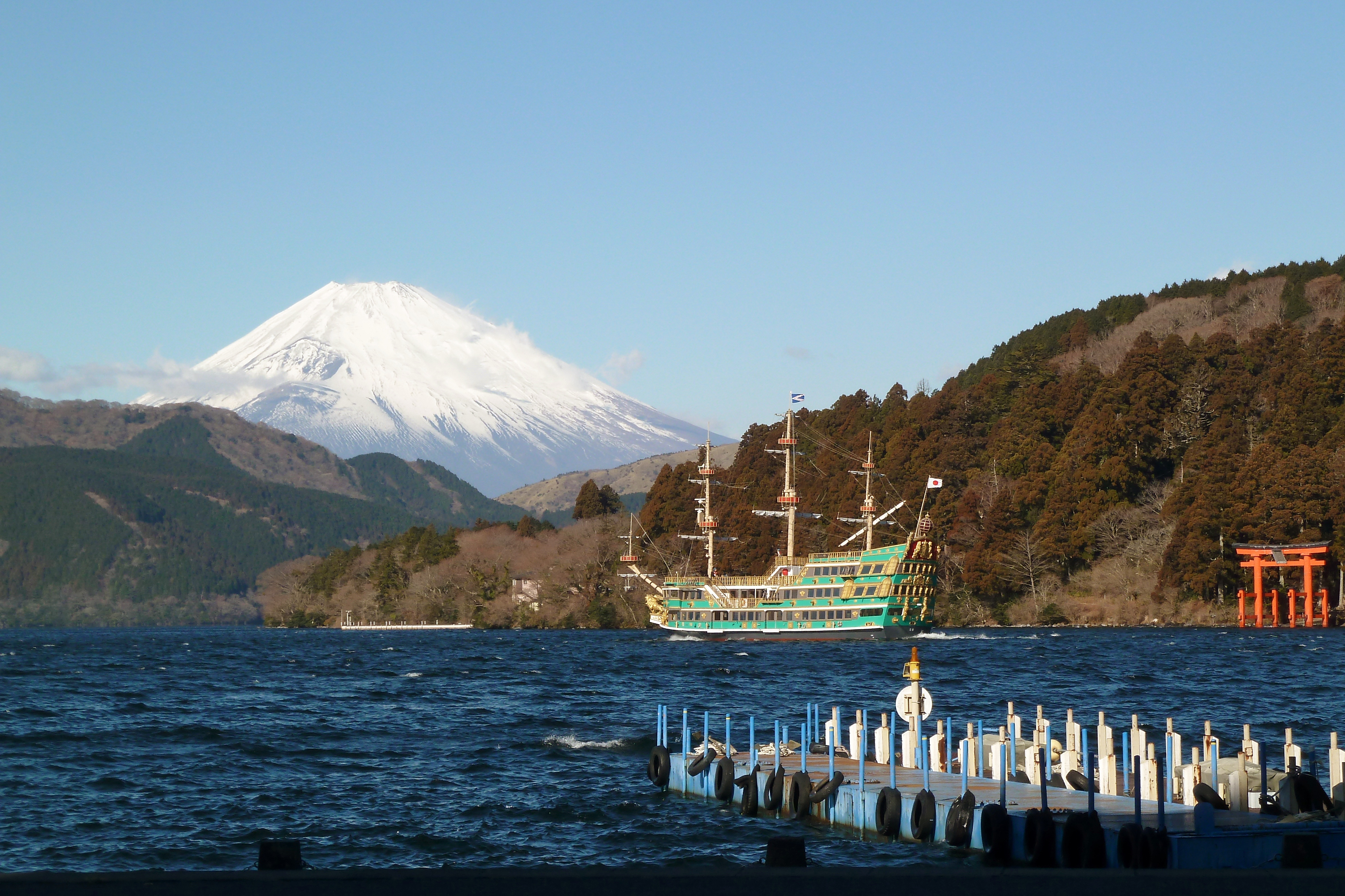
Lake Ashi pirate ship

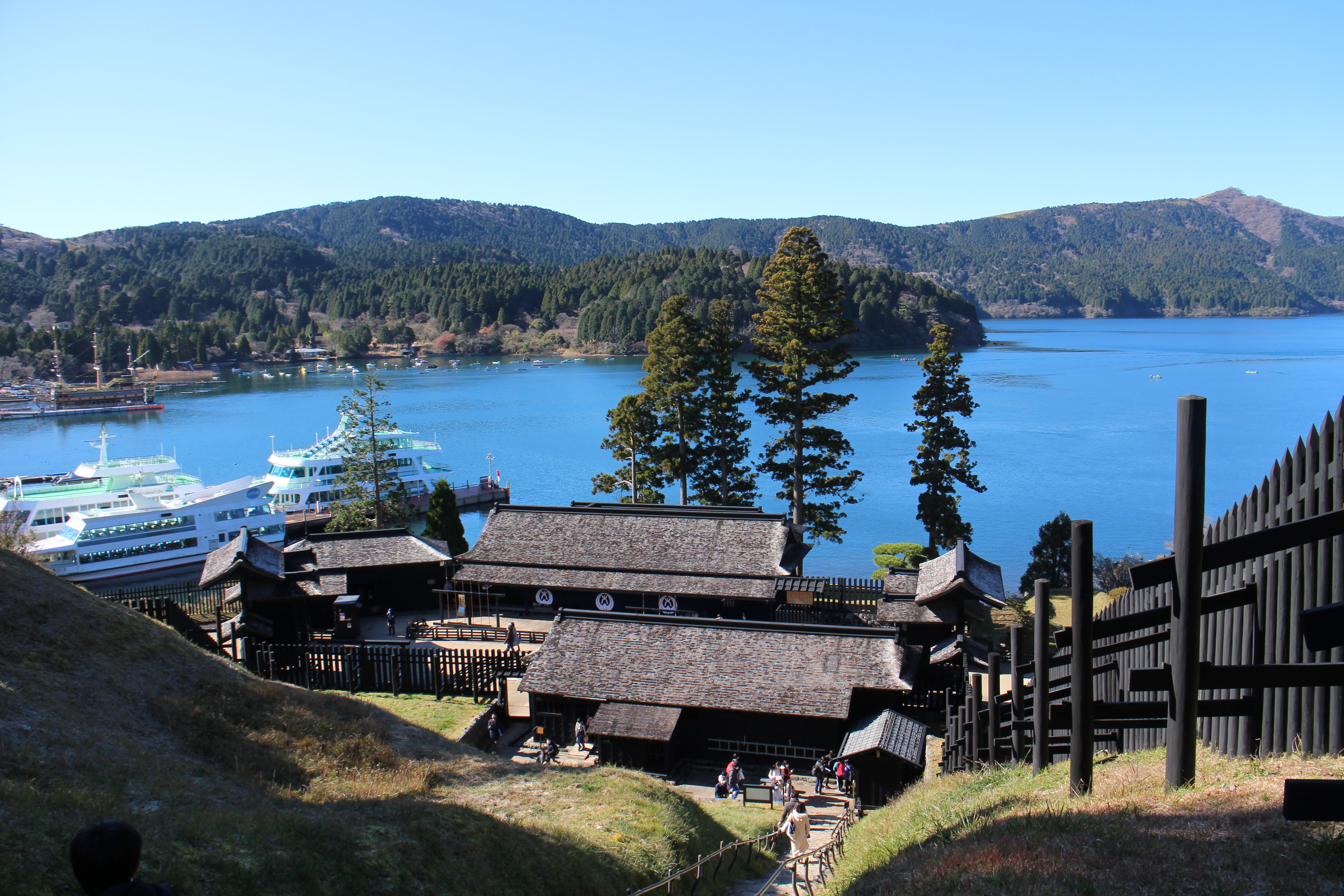
Panorama view of ancient Hakone Barrier area and Lake Ashi

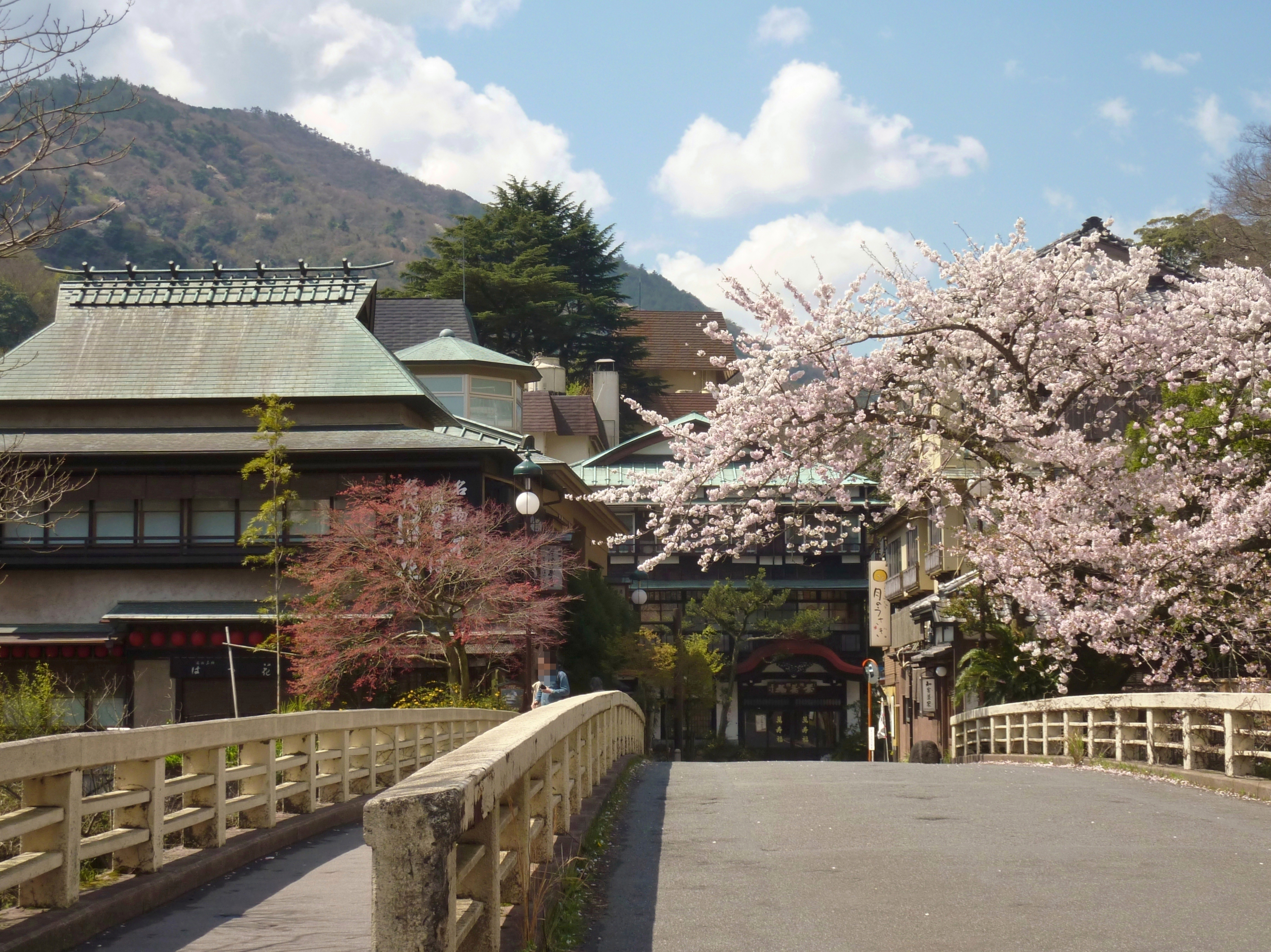
Hakone Yumoto Spa area
