= Pola Museum of Art =

- ポーラ美術館
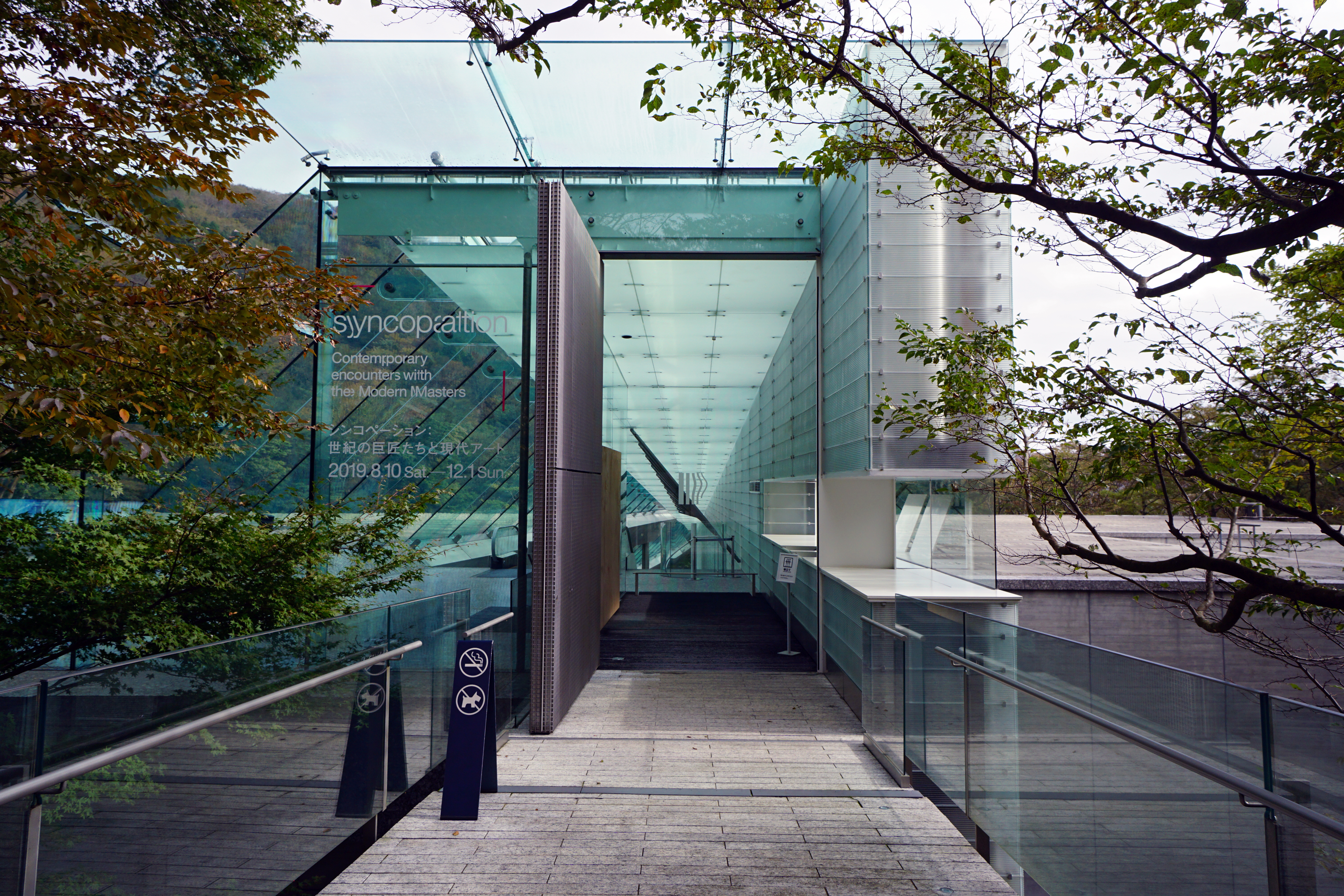
- Interactive fullscreen map

General information
- Address: 1285 Kozukayama, Sengokuhara
- Town or city: Hakone, Kanagawa Prefecture
- Country: Japan
- Coordinates: 35°15′25″N 139°1′16″E
- Opened: September 2002

Website
- www.polamuseum.or.jp/english

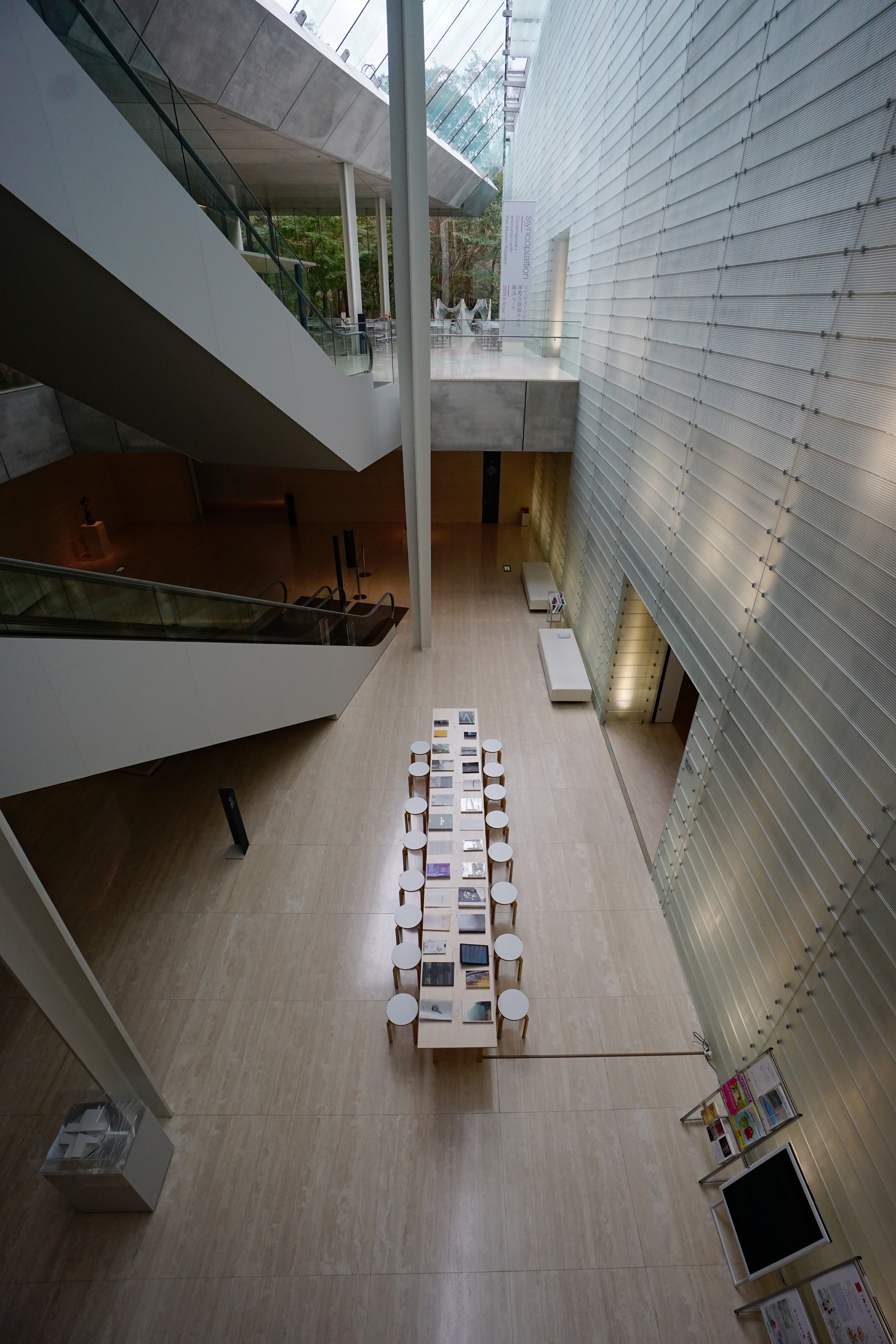
B2F lobby

Pola Museum of Art (ポーラ美術館, Pōra Bijutsukan) is located in Hakone, Kanagawa Prefecture, Japan. It opened in September 2002 within Fuji-Hakone-Izu National Park. It houses the collection of over 9,500 works acquired by the former head of the Pola cosmetics group, including many works of French Impressionism and of the École de Paris. The striking building is by Nikken Sekkei. The museum added the "Pola Museum of Art Nature Trail" in 2013, a 670 meter long hiking trail along the museum grounds intended for museum guests to enjoy the scenery at Fuji-Hakone-Izu National Park.

== Collection ==
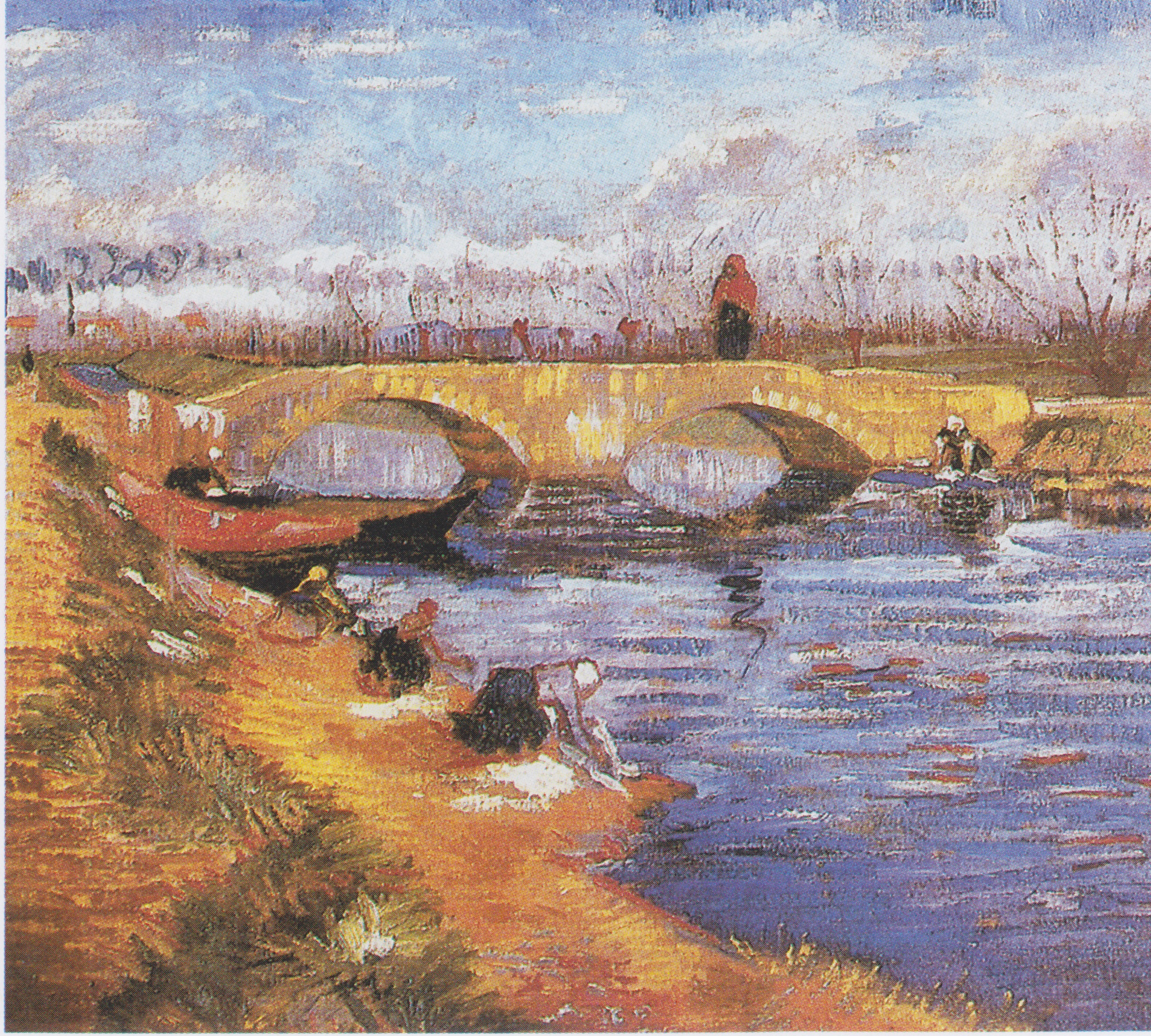
Pont de Gleize at Arles by Vincent van Gogh (1888)

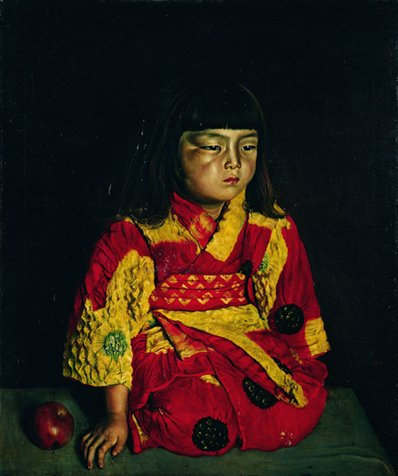
Portrait of Reiko Sitting by Ryūsei Kishida (1919)

== See also ==
- Gōra Station
- Hakone Open-Air Museum
- Hakone Botanical Garden of Wetlands
