= Hakone Imperial Villa =

Building in Hakone, Japan

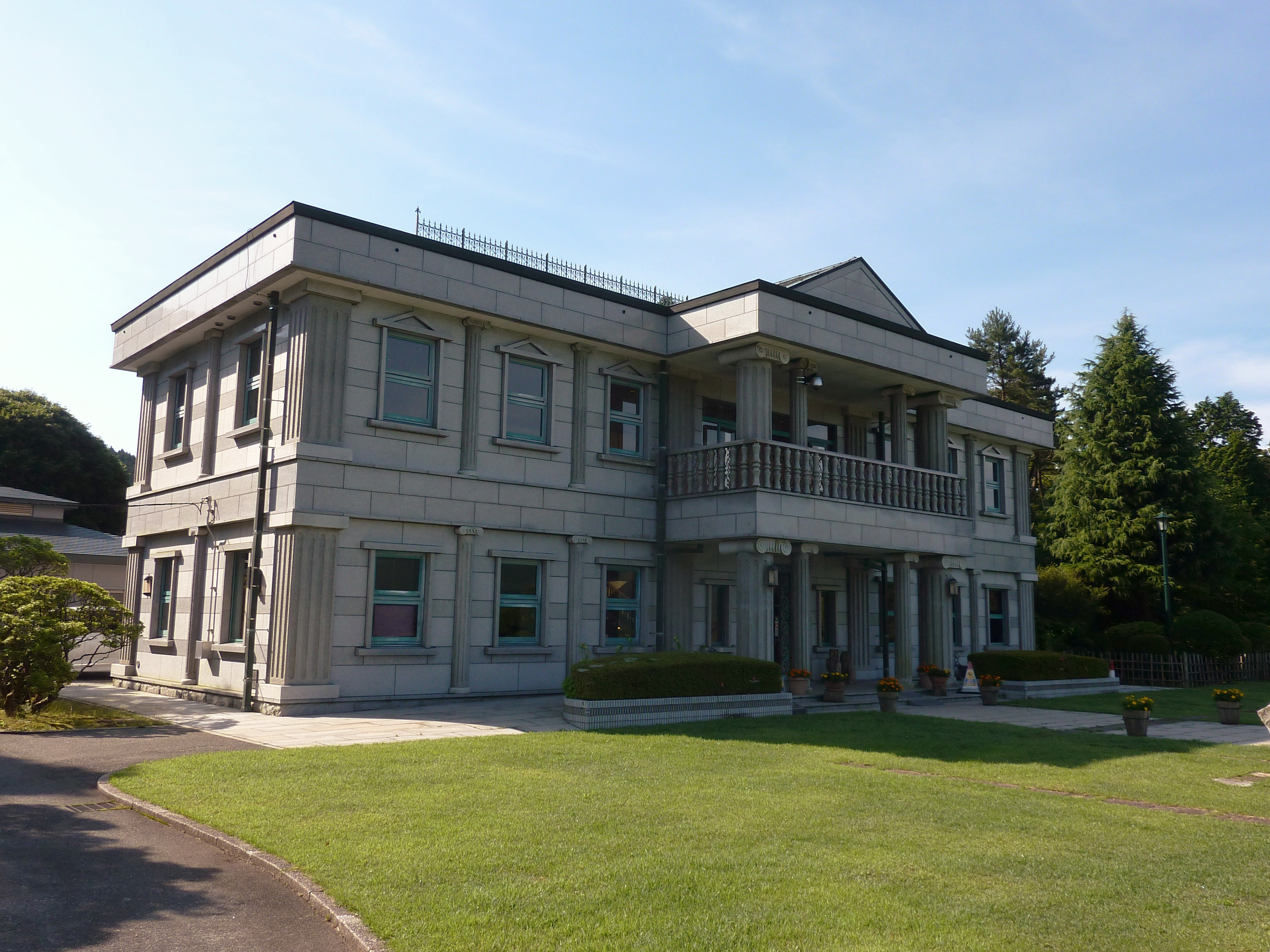
Former Hakone Imperial Villa

Hakone Imperial Villa (旧箱根離宮, Kyū Hakone Rikyū?), located in the town of Hakone, Japan is a residence formerly owned by the Japanese Imperial household. It was constructed in 1886.
