= Hakone Turnpike =

Japanese toll road

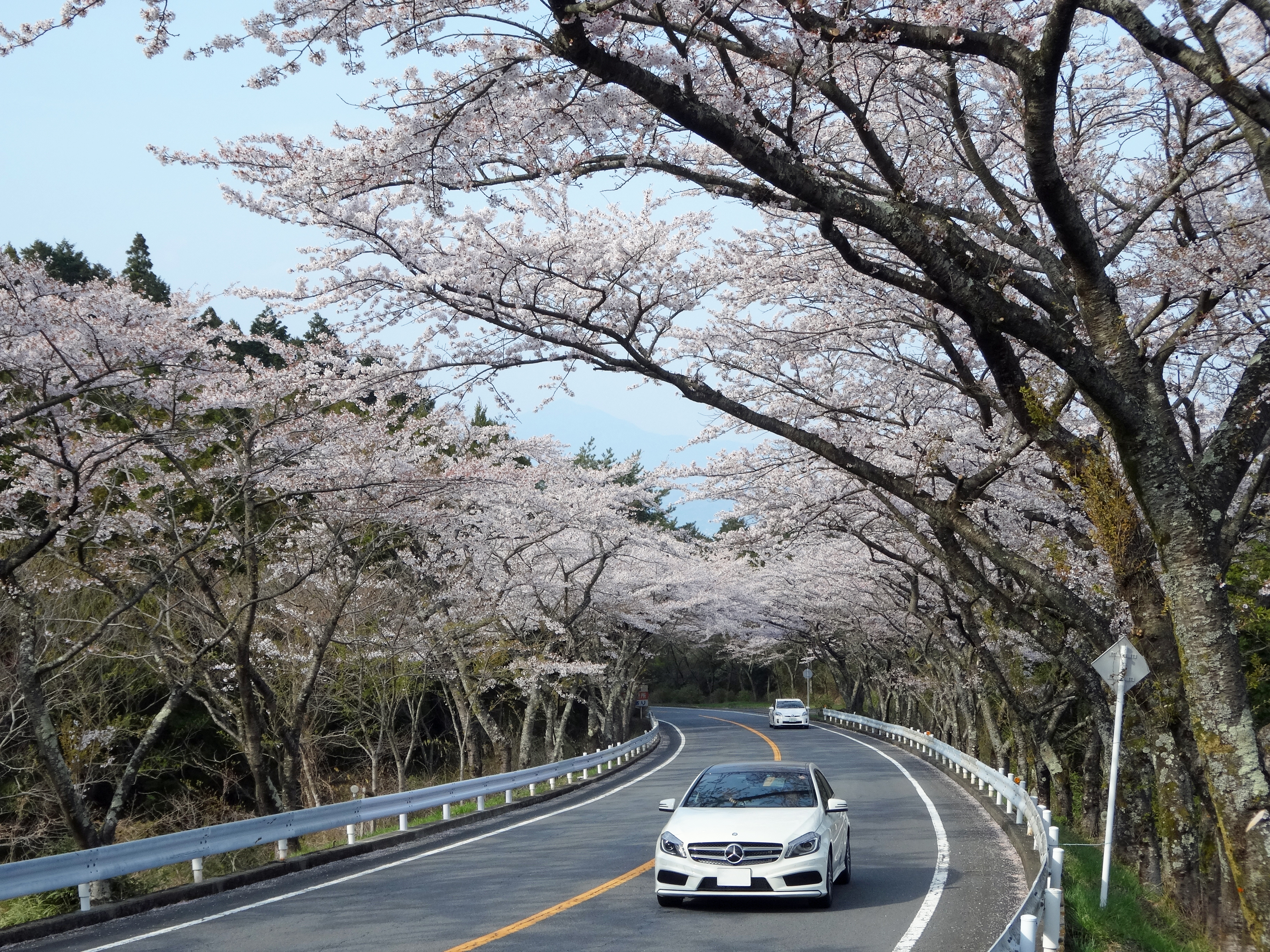
Hakone Turnpike, Japan, in Spring

Hakone Turnpike (Japanese: 箱根ターンパイク), is a 15.752 km privately owned toll road in Kanagawa, Japan, connecting Odawara with Yugawara, via Hakone.

Hakone Turnpike opened as an important bypass road of Hakone Shindō, the busy, mountainous part of National Route 1, on February 16, 1955. At the top of the road near the toll gate is the Daikanzan Observation Deck vista point giving views of Mount Fuji and is commonly used as a meeting point for automotive events held on the turnpike.

The road is famous among the automotive community and has been the site of both legal and illegal street racing for many years.

Japanese auto manufacturers commonly use the road as a sort of testing grounds for development and to showcase new vehicles to the press. It is chosen due to the low traffic and corner layout that provides a challenge both mechanically for vehicles and the skill wise for the drivers. This is very similar to how the more famous racing toll road, the Nürburgring, is used by European auto manufacturers for the same purposes. The similarities are to the extent that the road is often nicknamed Japan's Nürburgring.

Between the 2km and 7km markers the road is lined with cherry blossom trees, referred to as the Cherry Blossom Tunnel, and is a festival destination during the annual blooming season.

== Corporate partnerships ==
The road is currently owned by Central Nippon Expressway Company's Hakone Turnpike subsidiary and is officially known as the Anest Iwata Turnpike Hakone, who acquired the naming rights in 2018. Previously it was sponsored by Mazda from 2014 until 2017 during which it was officially known as Mazda Turnpike Hakone. Prior to Mazda, the road was sponsored by Toyo Tires and officially known as the Toyo Tires Turnpike from 2007 until 2014.

== See also ==
- Ashinoko Skyline, another toll road in the Hakone area
