= Ashinoko Skyline =

Road in Japan

Coordinates: 35.181944°N 139.013889°E

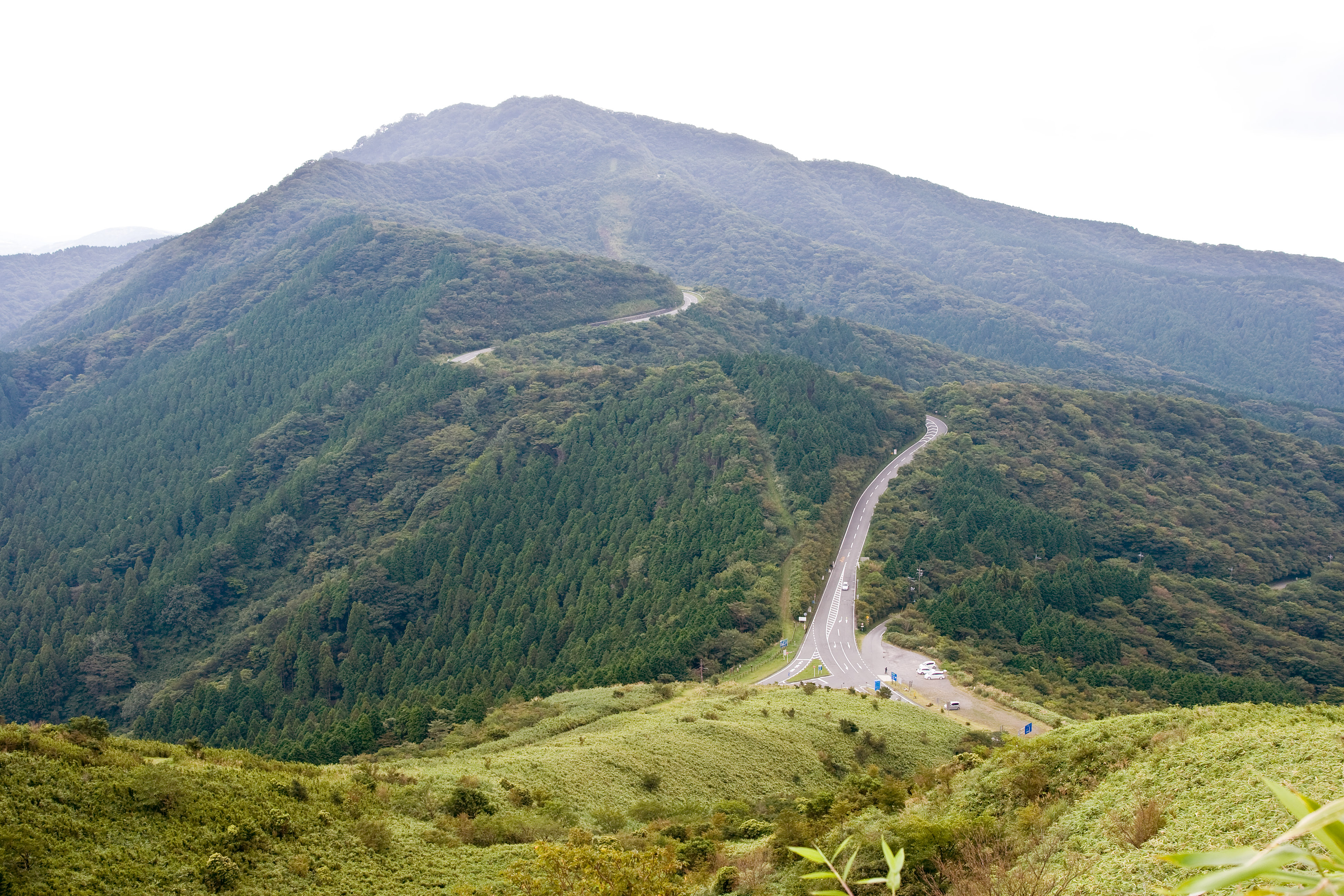
Ashinoko Skyline, Kanagawa, Japan

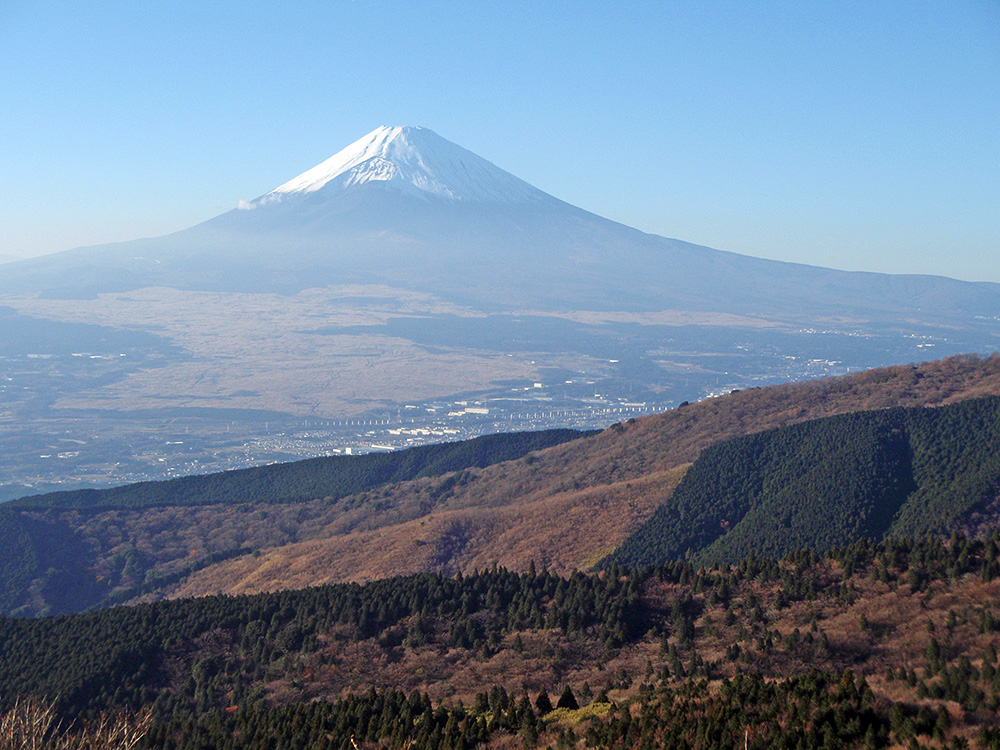
A view of Mount Fuji from Ashinoko Skyline

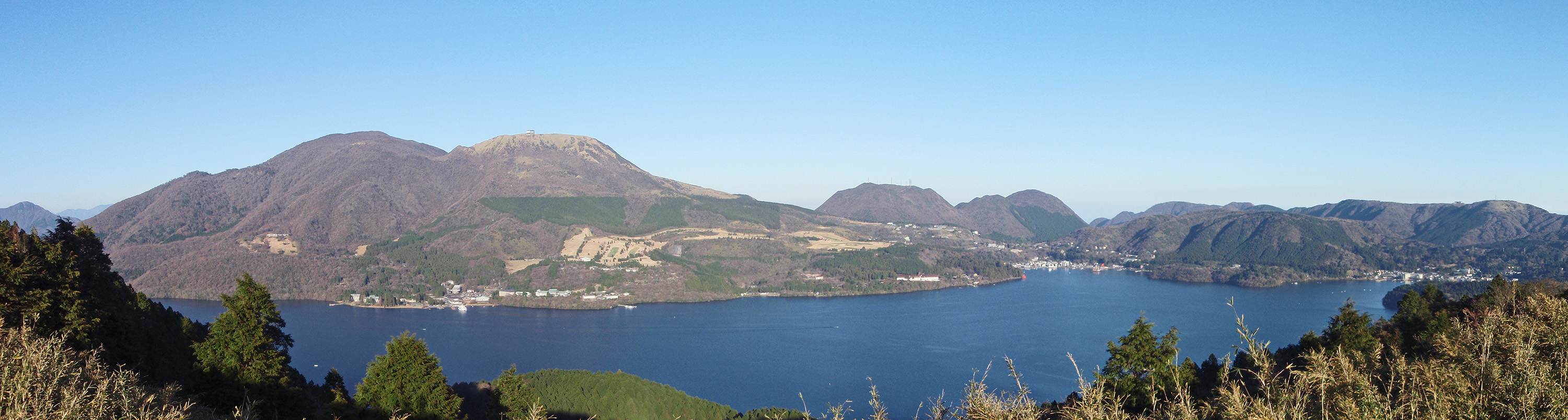
A view of Lake Ashi and the central peaks of Mount Hakone from Ashinoko Skyline

Ashinoko Skyline (Japanese: 芦ノ湖スカイライン) or Lake Ashi Skyline, is a 10.75 km toll road in Kanagawa, Japan, connecting National Route 1 near Hakone Pass, with Kojiri on the northern shores of Lake Ashi.

The entire length of Ashinoko Skyline opened in 1972, and goes over the scenic route of the outer volcanic ridge of Mount Hakone, with the views of Mount Fuji in the west, and Lake Ashi in the east. It is one of the first of the 50 or so scenic "Skyline" roads that followed in Japan, named after Skyline Drive in Shenandoah National Park over the Blue Ridge Mountains of Virginia, U.S.

== See also ==
- Hakone Turnpike
