= Hakone Botanical Garden of Wetlands =

Botanical garden in Japan

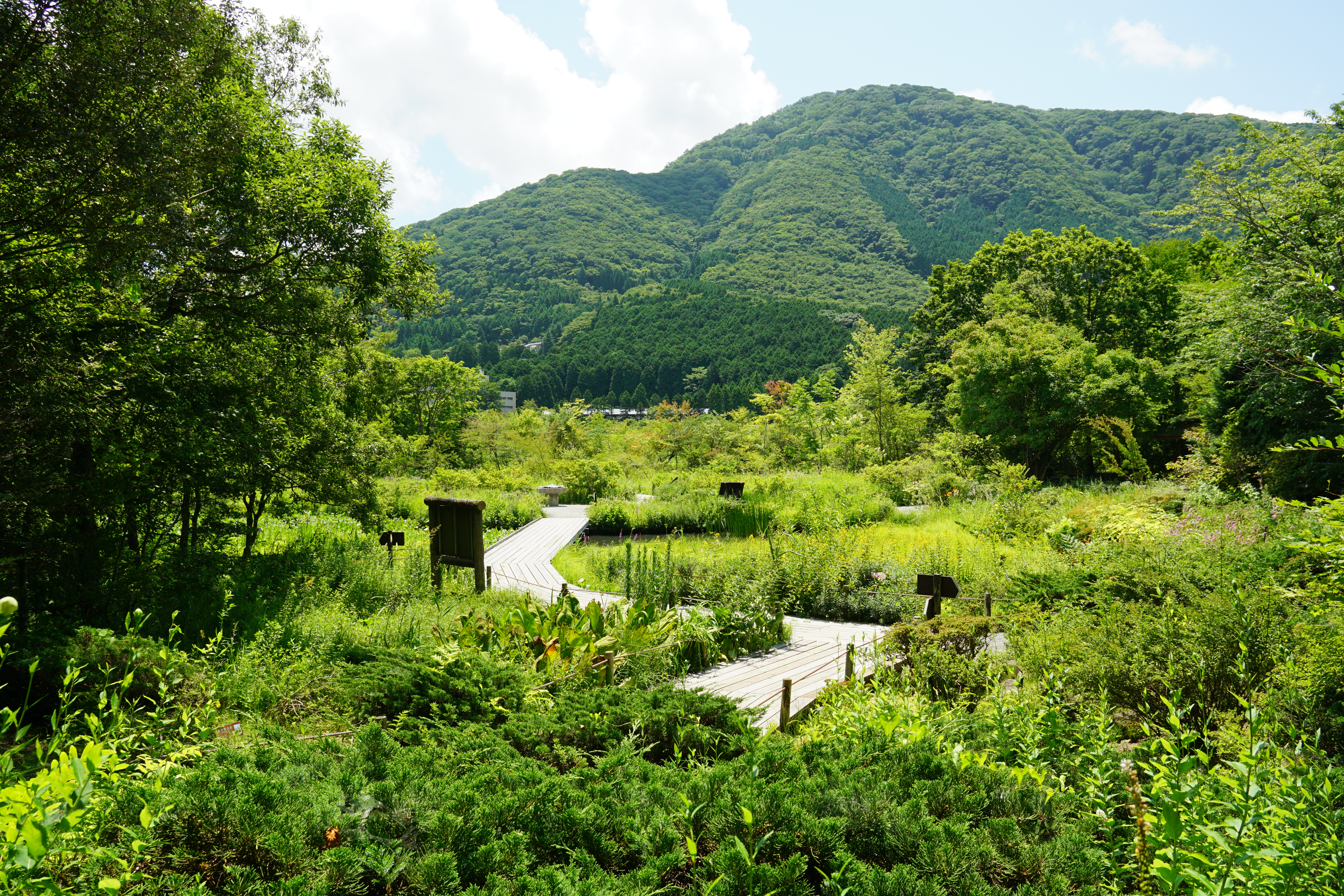
- Hakone Botanical Garden of Wetlands
- Interactive map of Hakone Botanical Garden of Wetlands
- Type: Public
- Location: Hakone, Kanagawa, Japan
- Coordinates: 35°15′58.23″N 139°00′25.48″E
- Created: 1976
- Operator: Fuji-Hakone-Izu National Park

The Hakone Botanical Garden of Wetlands (箱根湿生花園, Hakone Shisseikaen) is a botanical garden located within the Fuji-Hakone-Izu National Park at 817 Sengokuhara, Hakone, Kanagawa, Japan. It is open daily in the warmer months; an admission fee is charged.

The garden was founded in 1976, and now contains some 1700 plant varieties, including about 200 types of woody and herbaceous wetland plants from Japan, as well as 1300 varieties (120 species) of alpine plants. Collections include Habenaria, Hemerocallis, Iris, Lilium, Lysichitum, and Primula, plus deciduous trees such as Acer, Cornus, and Quercus.

== See also ==
- List of botanical gardens in Japan
- Fuji-Hakone-Izu National Park
