= Hōrai Valley =

Japanese geographical area

- 蓬莱峡
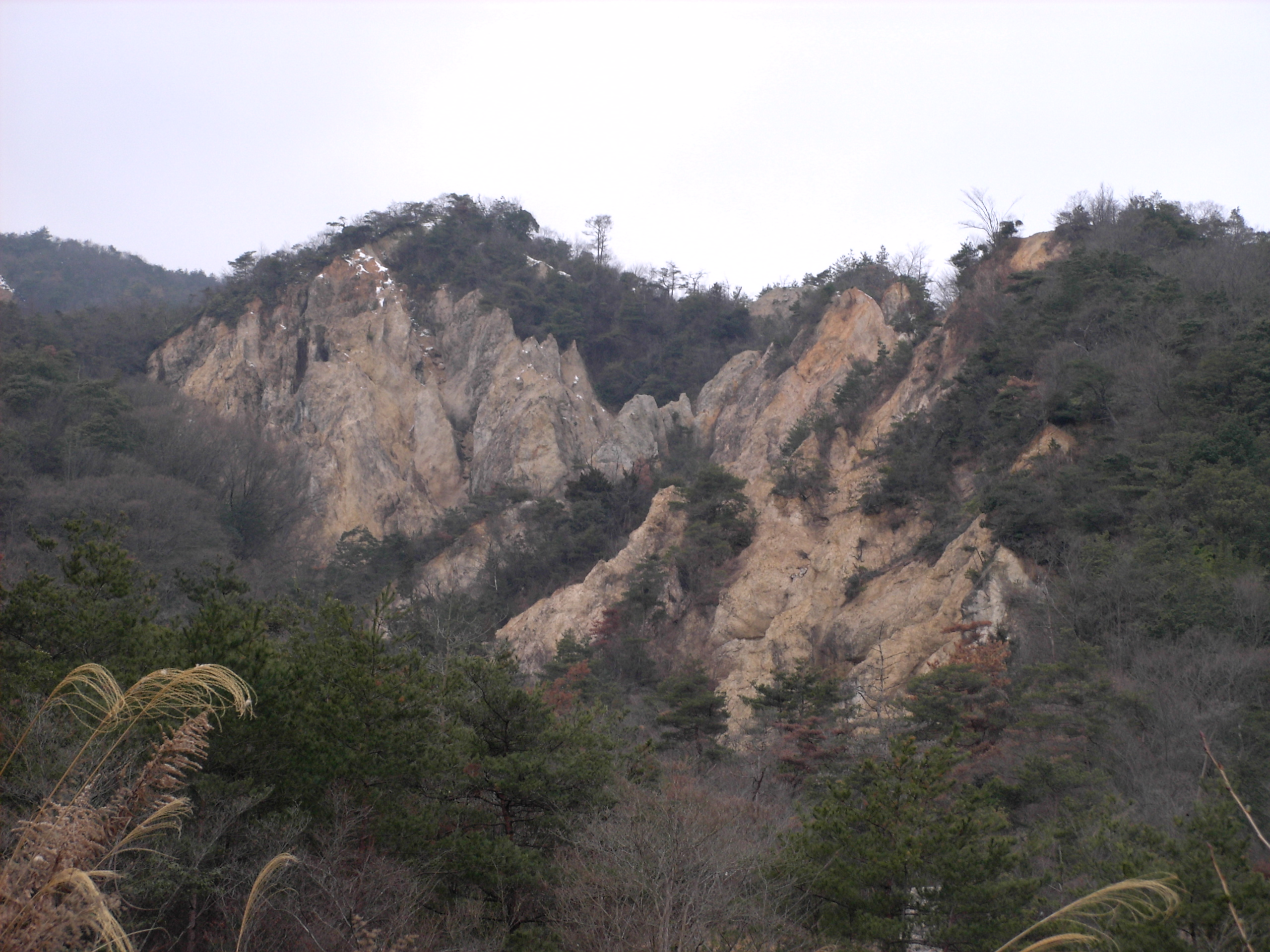
- A view of the Horai Valley

- Location within Hyōgo Prefecture Location within Japan

Geography
- Coordinates: 34°48′27″N 135°17′48″E
- Interactive map of Hōrai Valley

The Hōrai Valley (蓬莱峡, Hōrai-kyō) is a geographical area that is located in the Rokkō Mountains, Hyōgo, Japan. This valley is a part of Setonaikai National Park in Japan. The name of Hōrai Valley coming from a name of the mountain in a mystical land found in Chinese mythology.

== Outline ==
Horai Valley is located along the upper reaches of the Ōtada River in the Rokkō Mountains. Although the valley is considered to be a badland, the rugged terrain found here is rare in other badlands around the world. The valley is characterized by its white granite cliffs that stretch up to a hundred meters high, creating sawtooth-like ridges. This granite is brittle enough to be easily broken by the hands of climbers.

Because of its alien landscape, this location has often been used as a movie set for Japanese filmmakers. It is also a frequent destination for climbers and tourists alike.

== Access ==
- Shirube Iwa Bus stop or Zatodani Bus stop of Hankyu Bus.

== Gallery ==
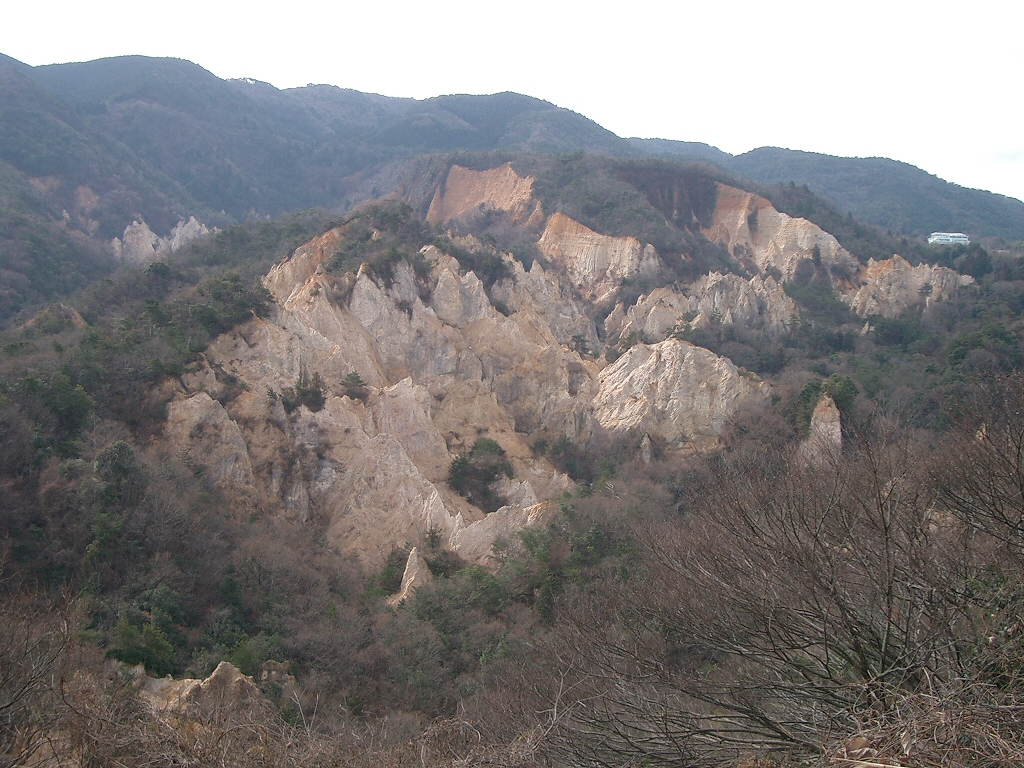
A Far View of Horai Valley (1)

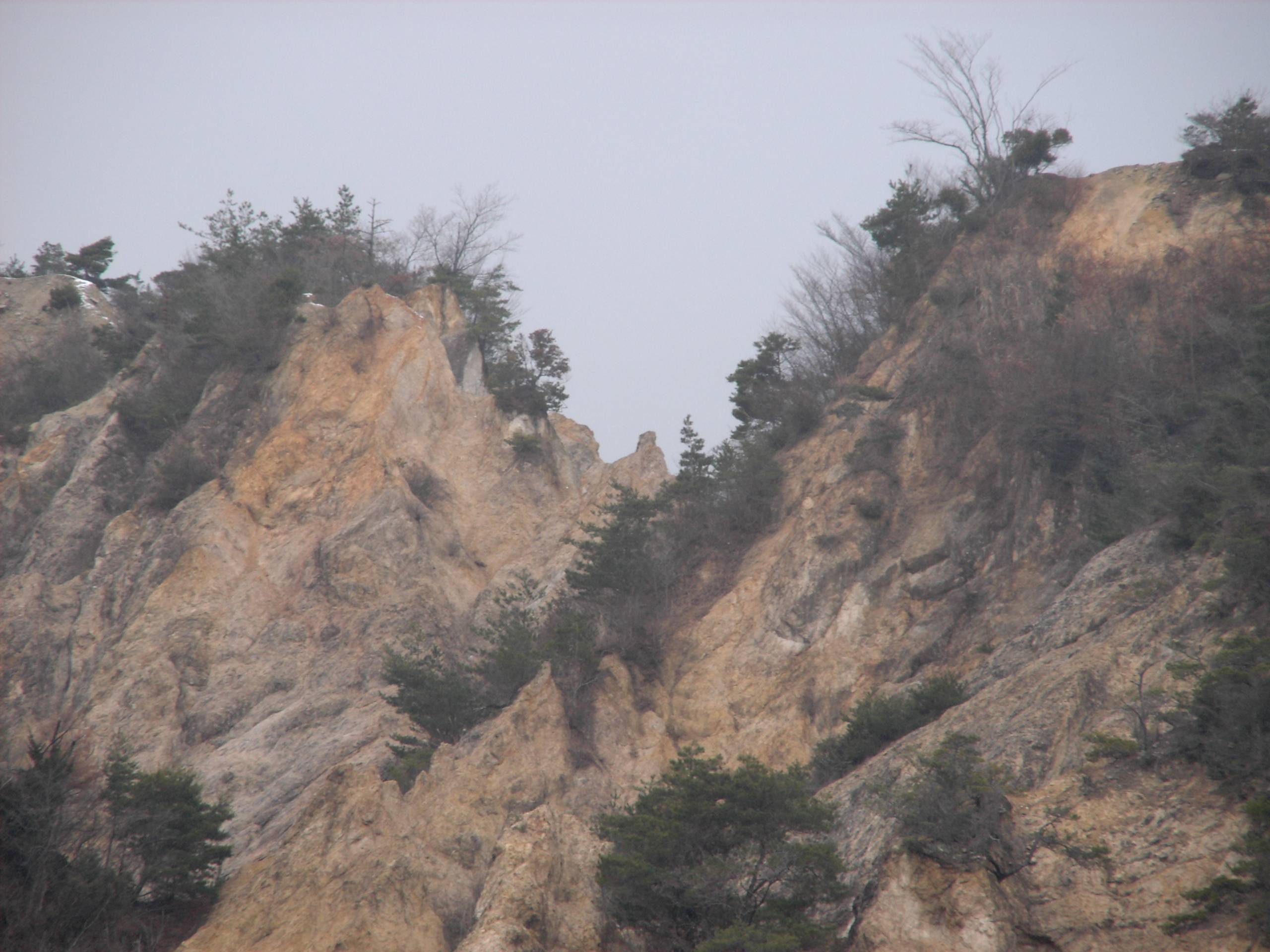
A Far View of Horai Valley (2)

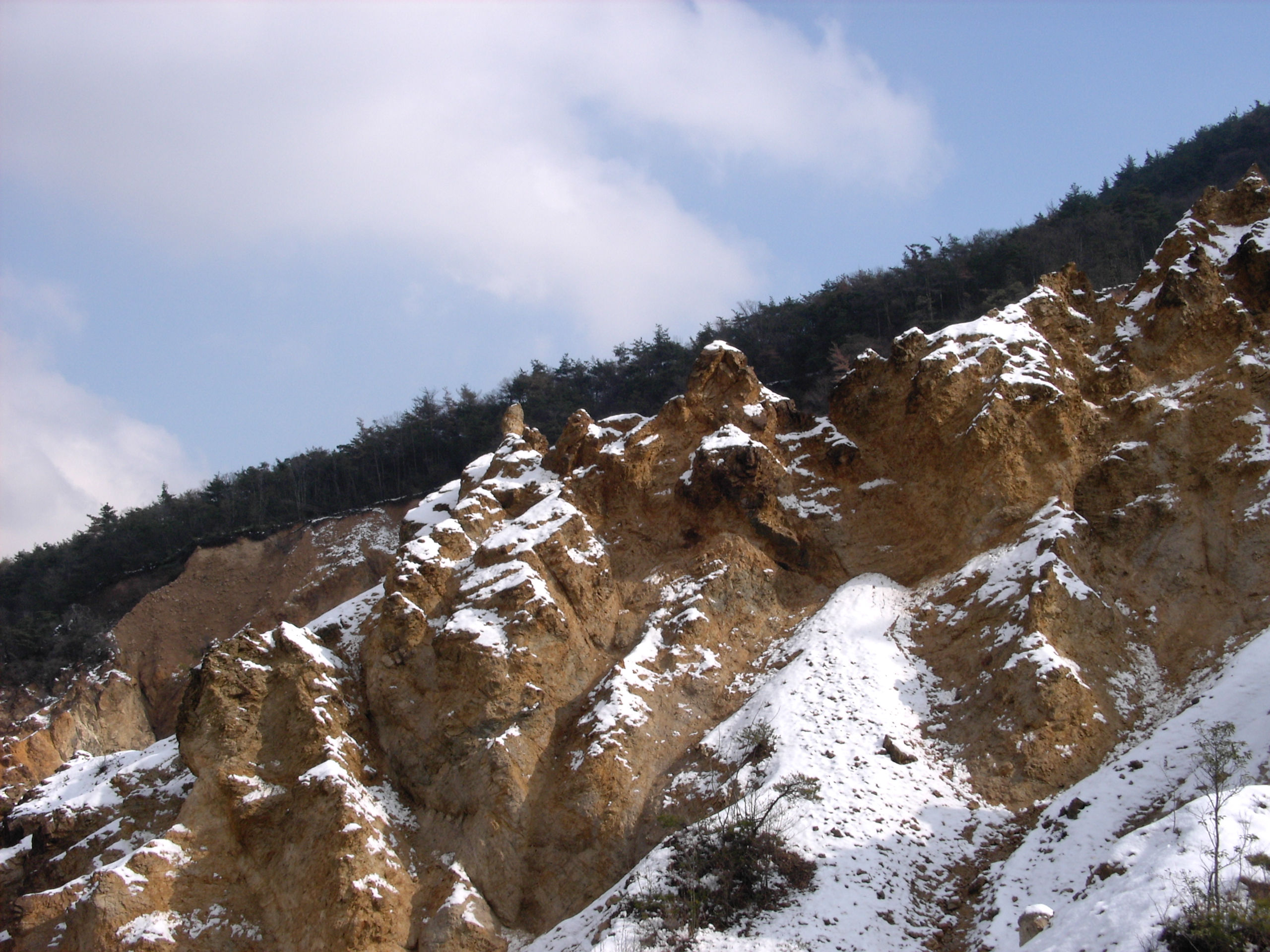
A Scene of Deep Horai Valley (1)

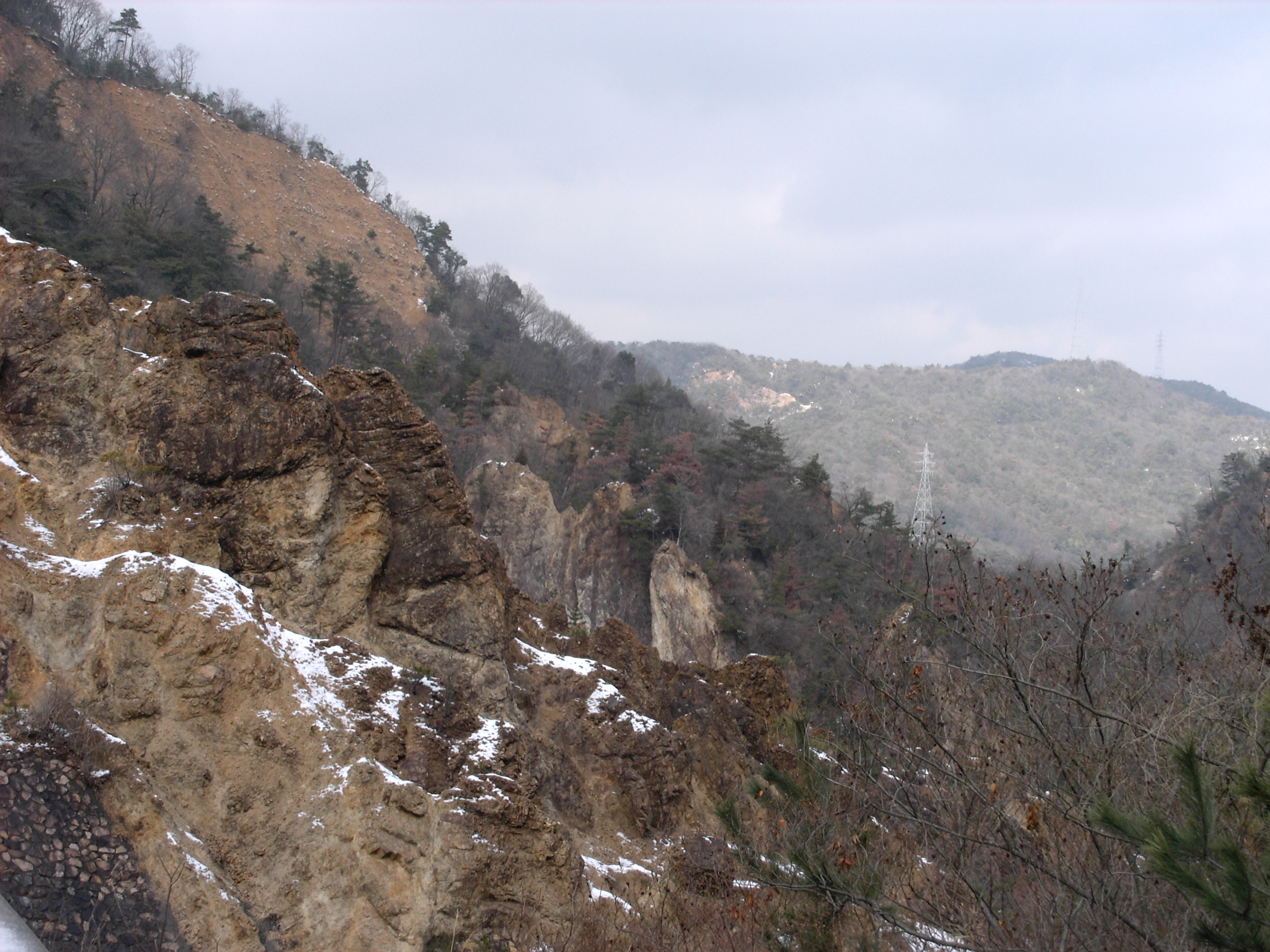
A Scene of Deep Horai Valley (2)

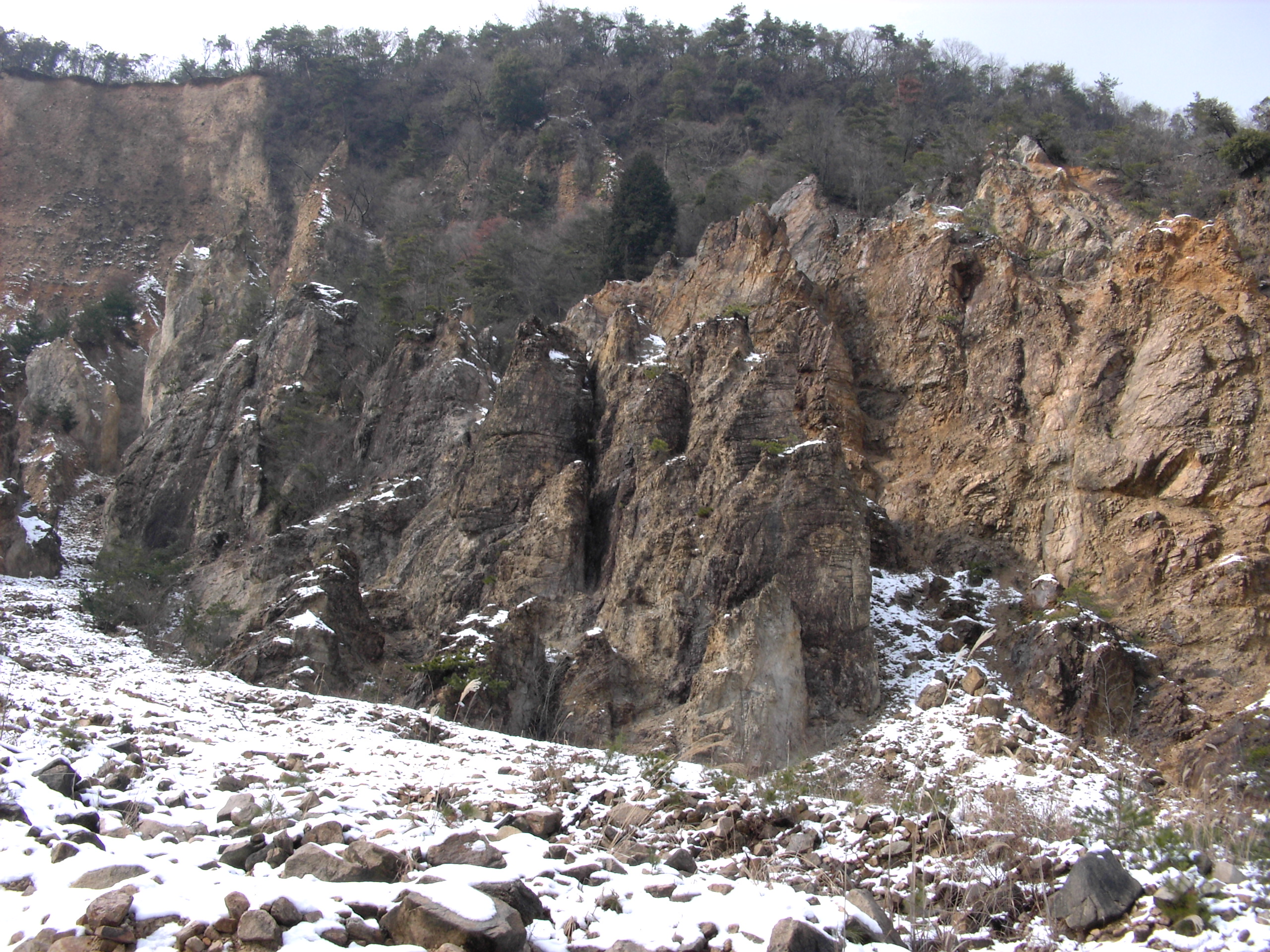
A Scene of Deep Horai Valley (3)

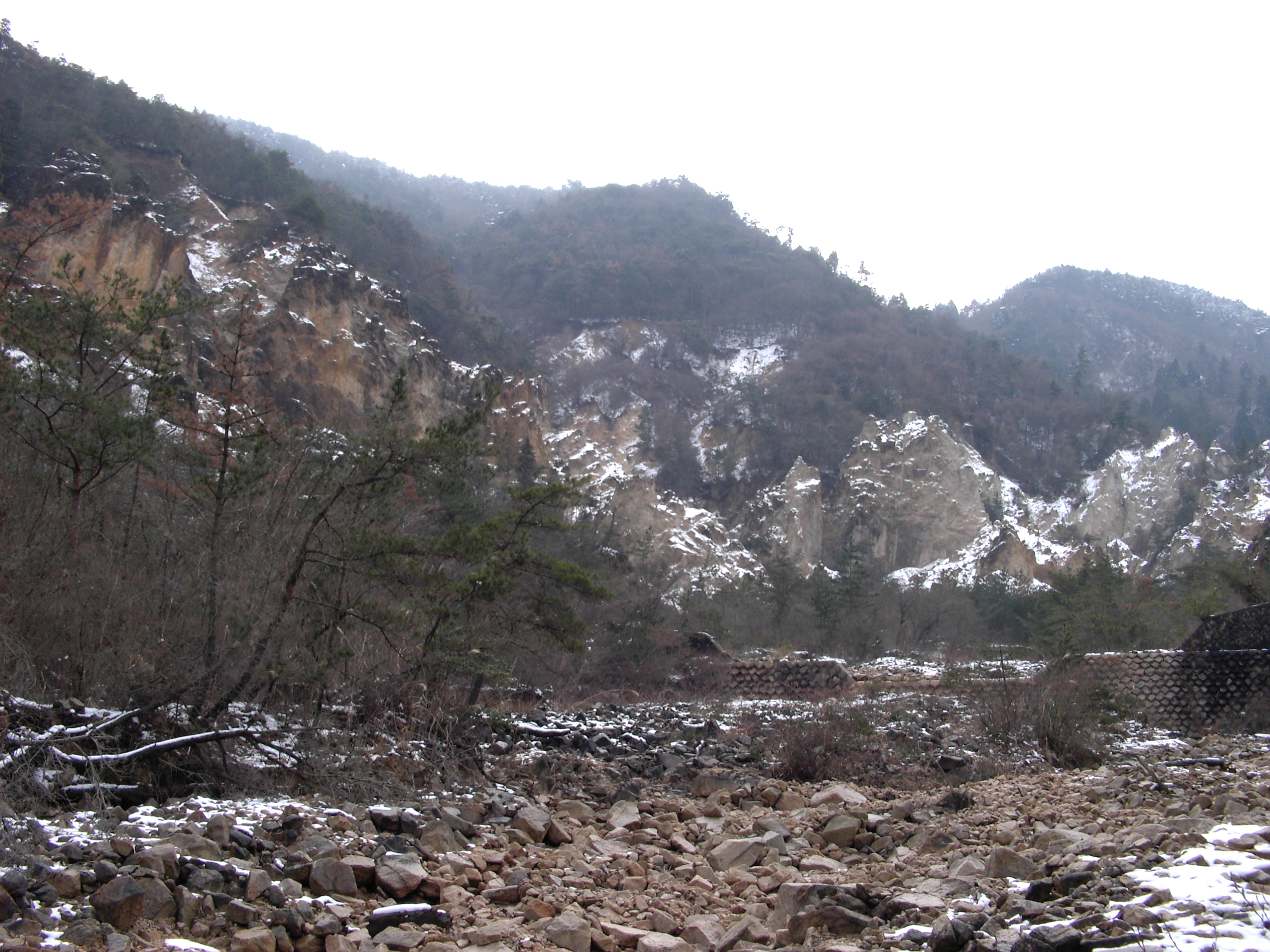
A Scene of Deep Horai Valley (4)

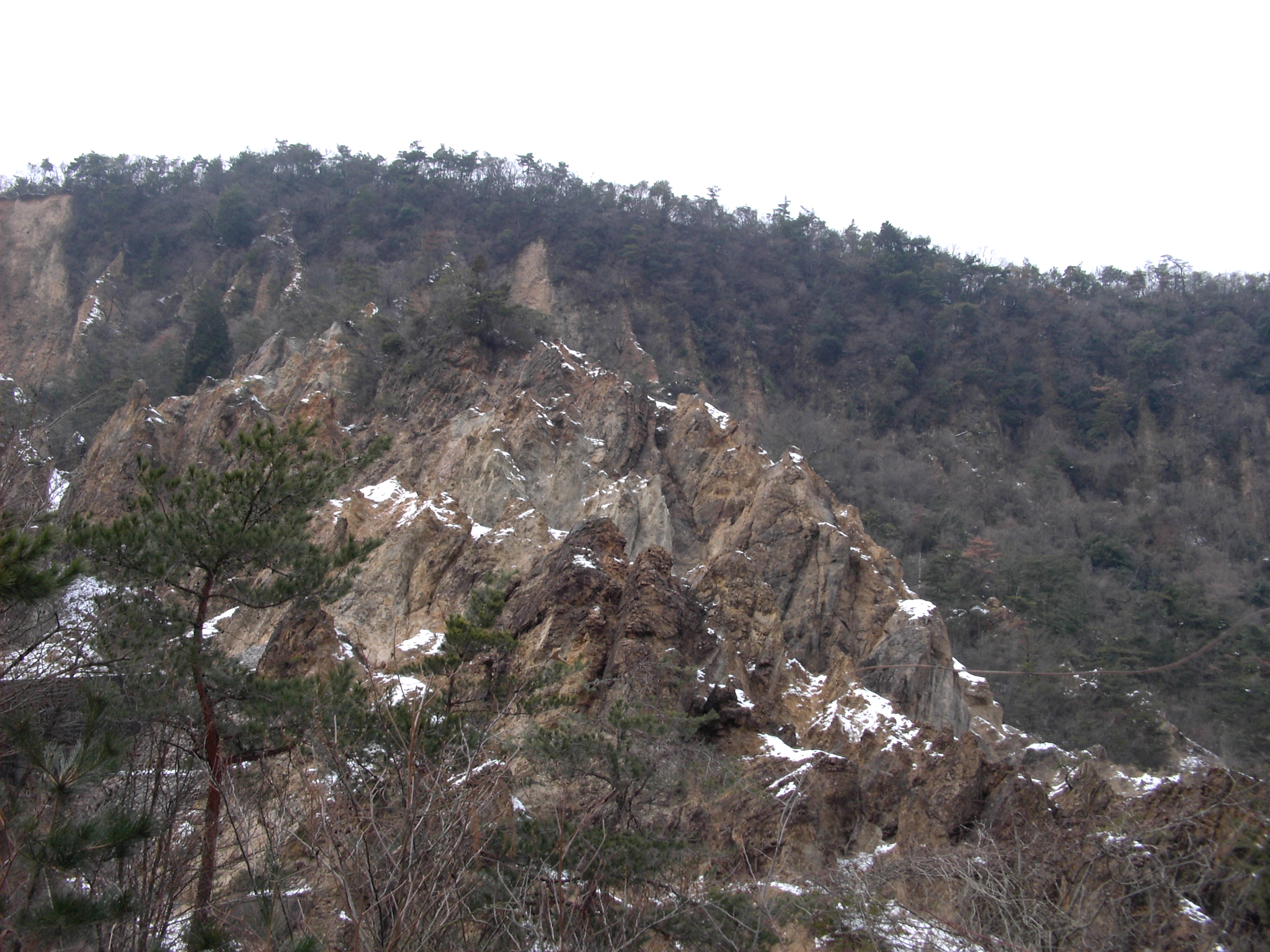
A Scene of Deep Horai Valley (5)

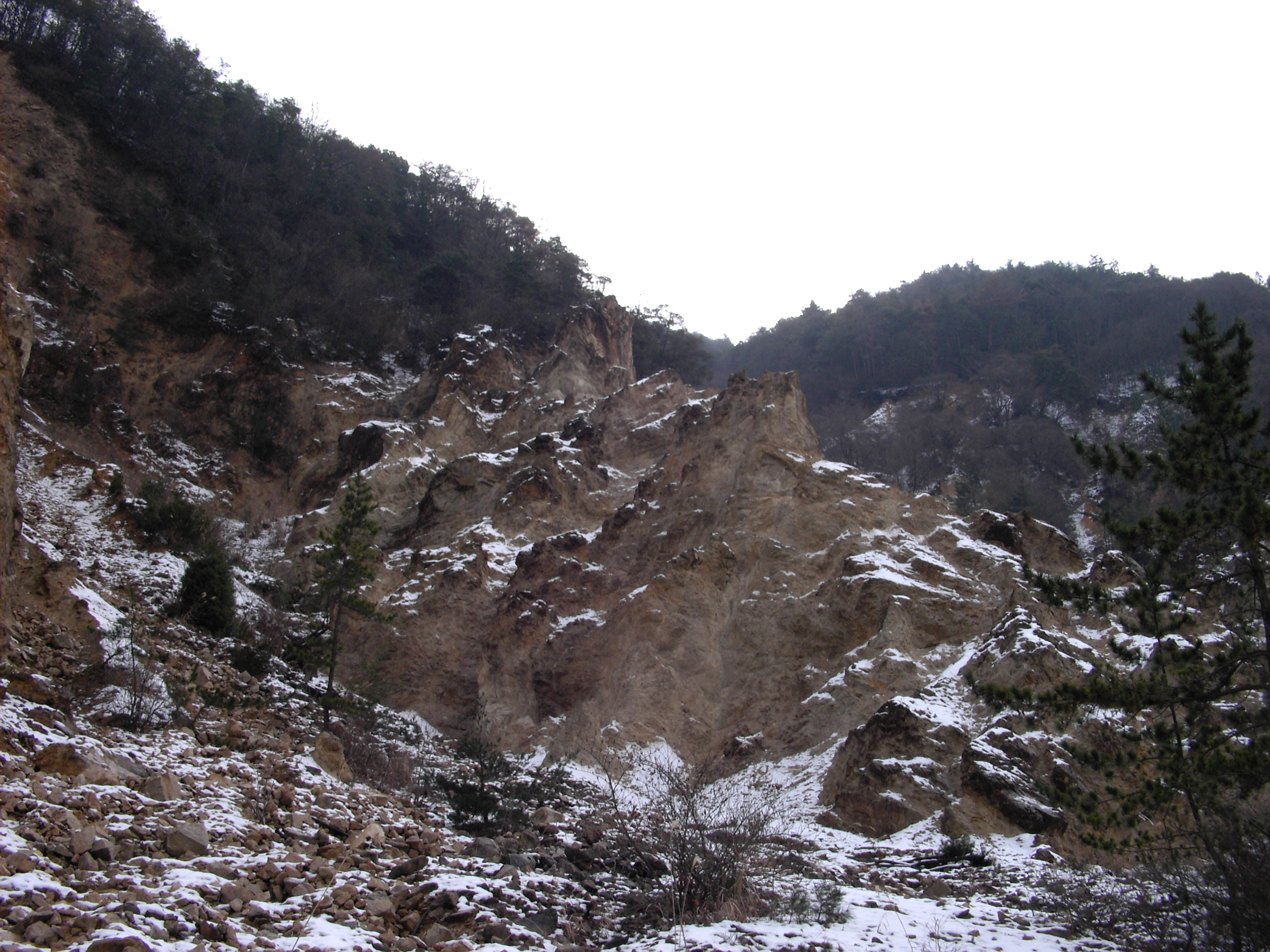
A Scene of Deep Horai Valley (6)

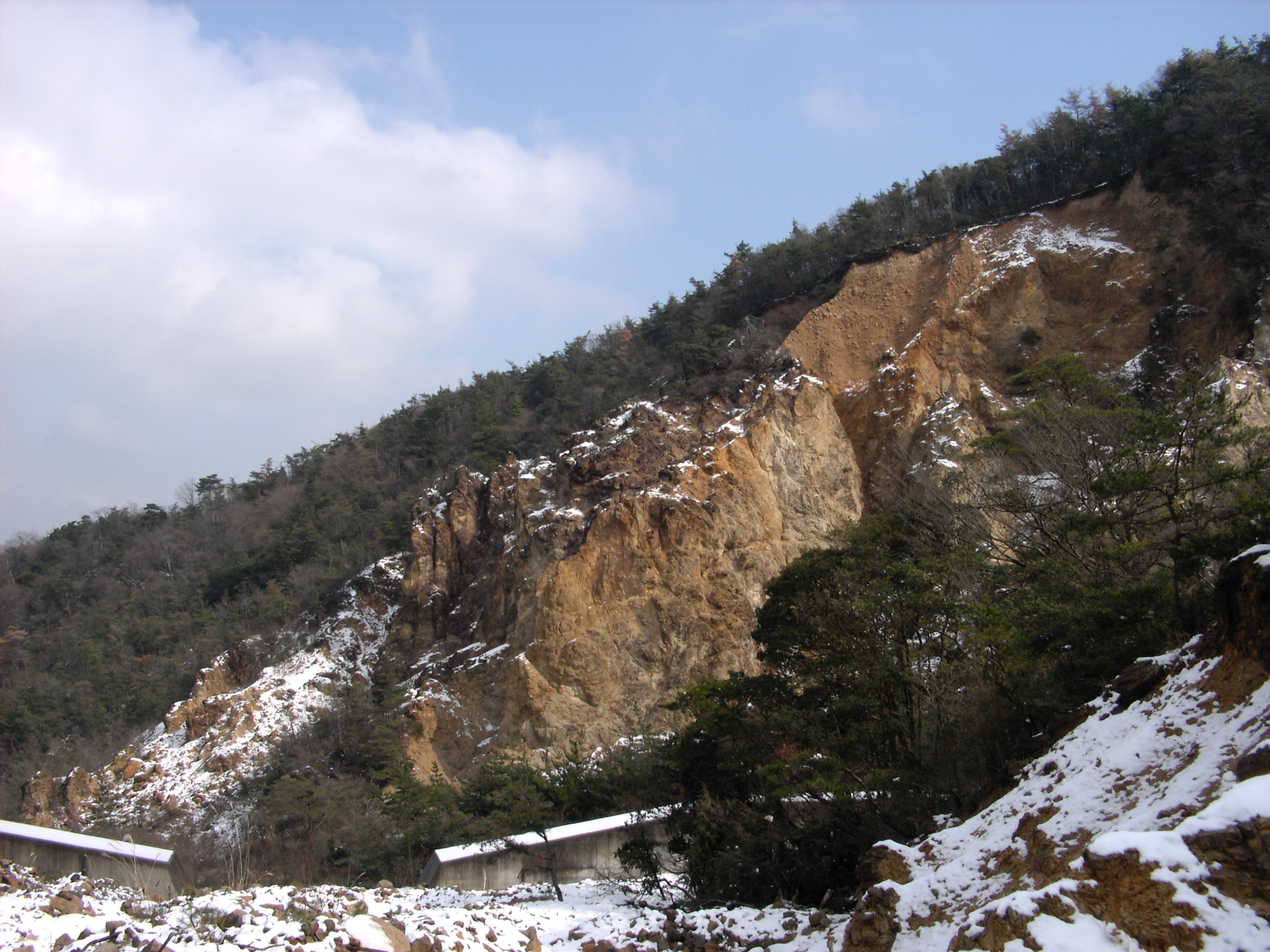
A Scene of Deep Horai Valley (7)

== See also ==
- Kamakura Valley
