= Nunobiki Herb Garden =

Herb garden in Kobe, Japan

Coordinates: 34°42′55″N 135°11′32″E

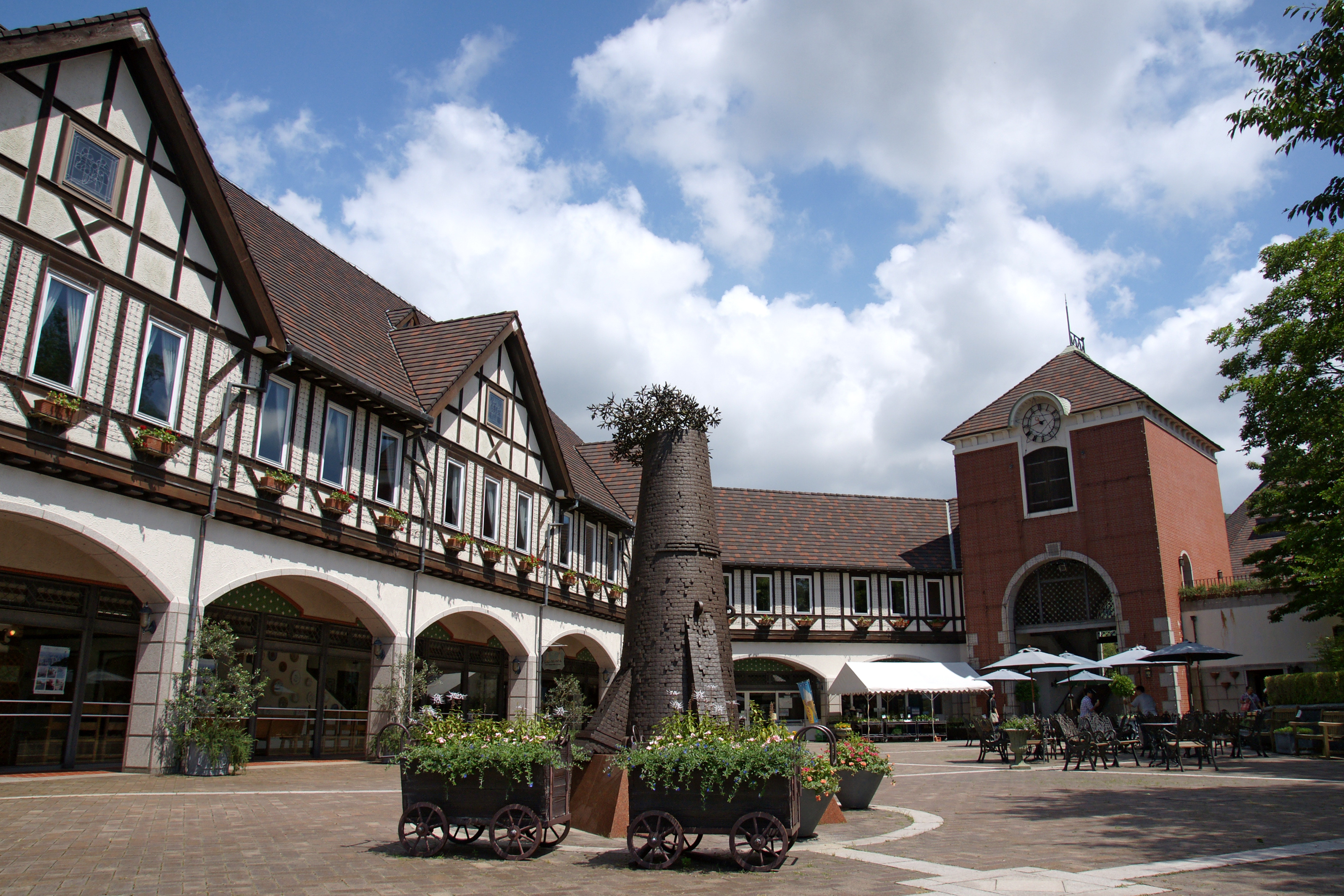
The Rest House

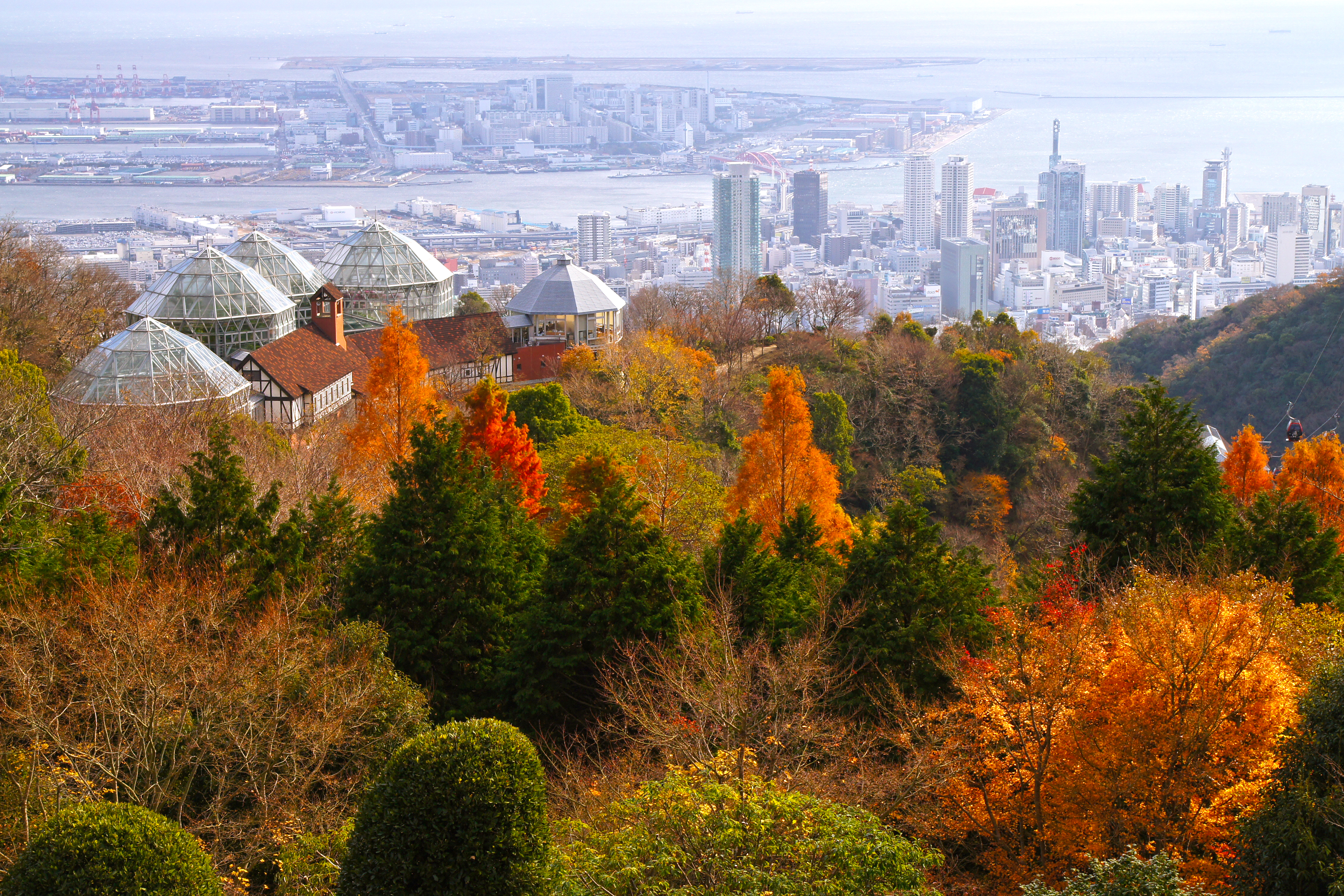
The Glass House, and city view

The Nunobiki Herb Garden (布引ハーブ園, Nunobiki Hābu-en, 40 acres) is a herb garden located on Mount Rokkō above Kobe, Japan. It is open daily; an admission fee is charged.

The garden is accessed by Shin-Kobe Ropeway gondola lift from downtown Kobe. It features over 75,000 herbs (200 varieties), plus greenhouses, restaurant and cafe, museums, exhibits, and gift shops.

The garden was built in 1991.

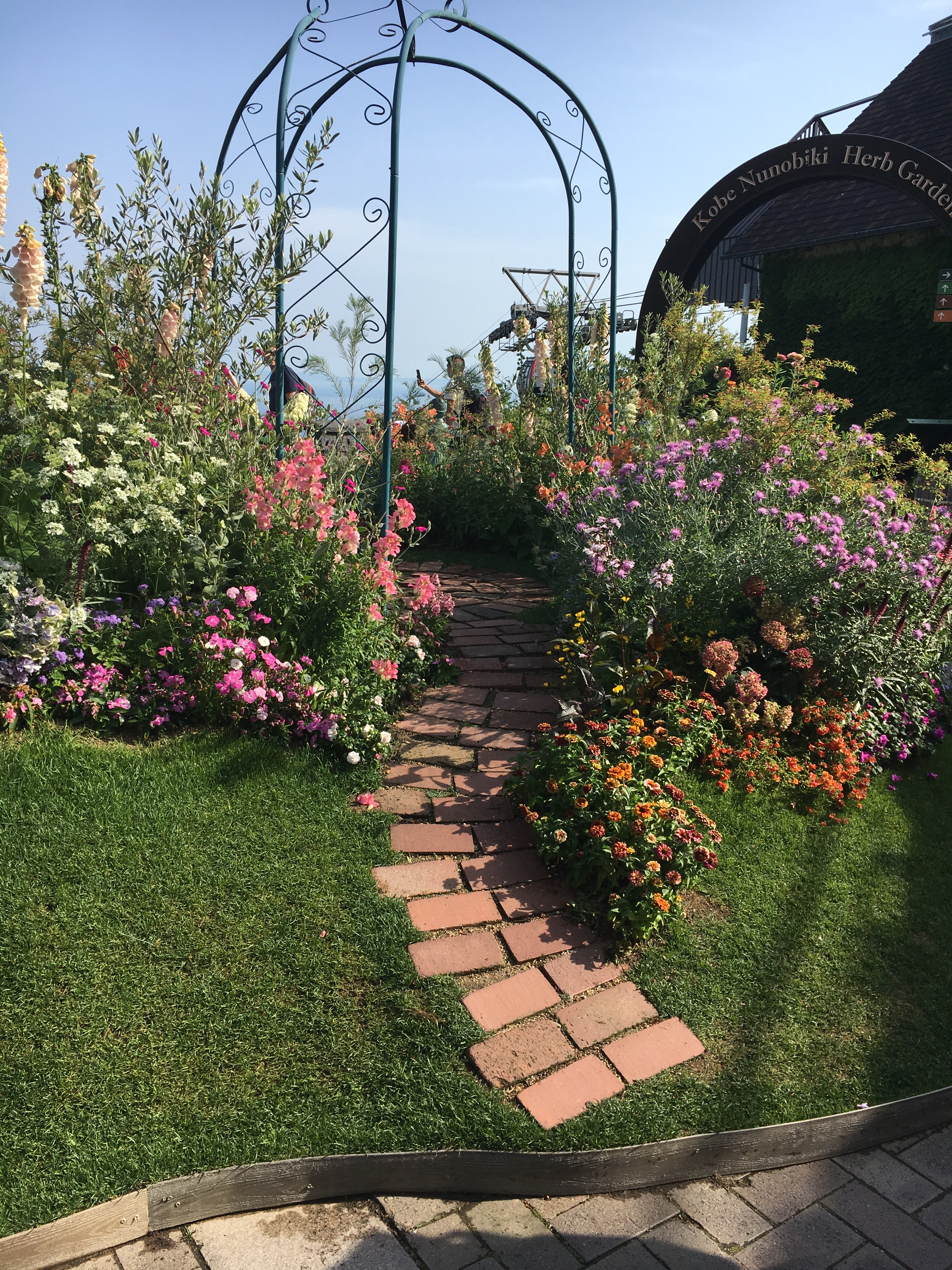
Archway with plants at the Nunobiki Herb Garden in Kobe, Japan.

== See also ==
- List of botanical gardens in Japan
