= Rokkosan Pasture =

Pasture farm in Kobe, Japan

Coordinates: 34°45′06″N 135°12′33″E

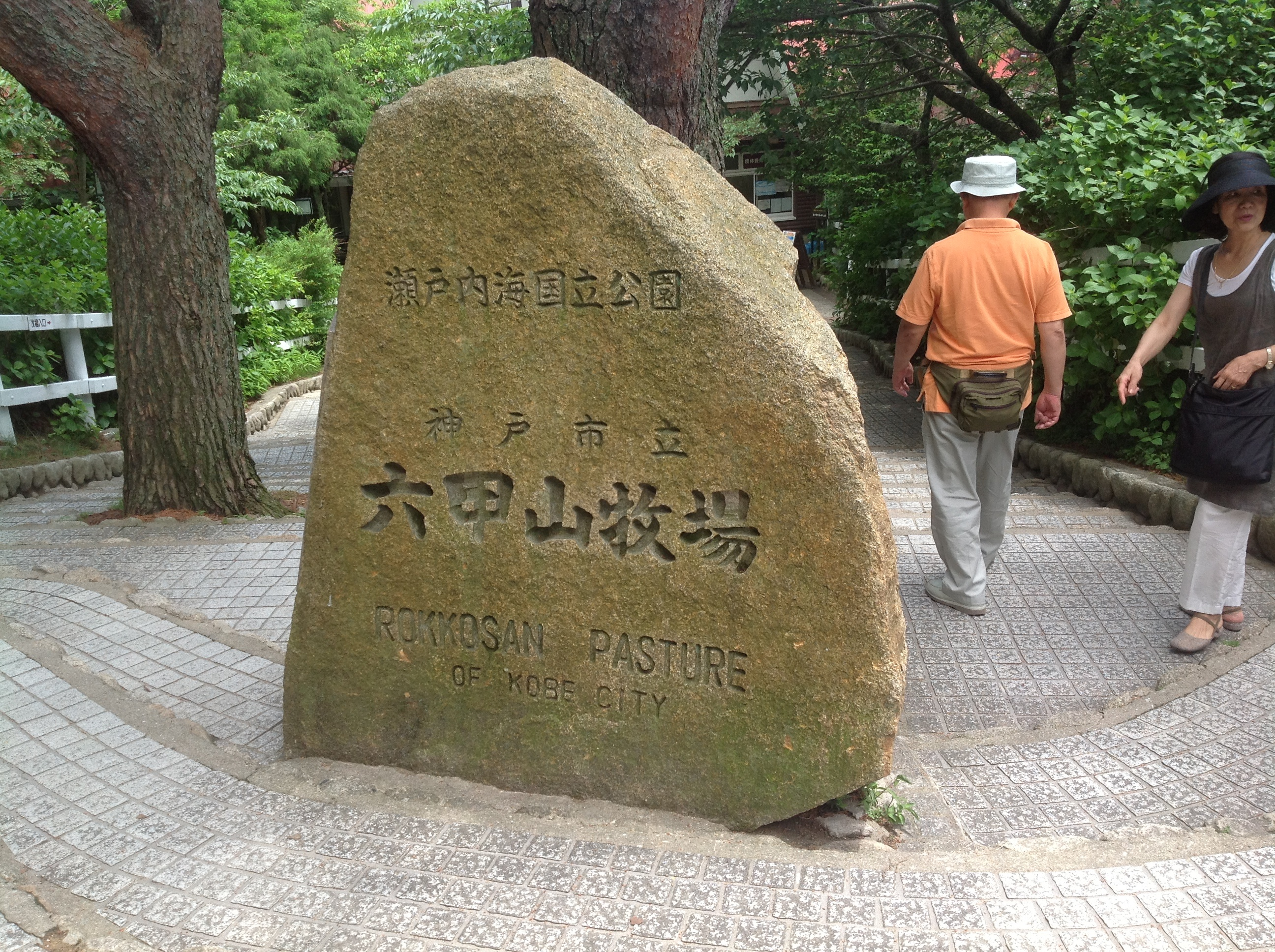
Stone plaque marking entrance of Rokkosan Pasture

Rokkosan Pasture (神戸市立六甲山牧場, Kōbe Shiritsu Rokkōsan Bokujō) is a public pasture farm situated in Mount Rokkō, Kobe, Japan.

== History ==
The construction of a pasture farm on Mount Rokkō was already considered in as early as 1975, when surveys on the pros and cons of building such a pasture were taken.

== Nature ==
Known for its "beautiful natural settings", a handful of animal species can be found roaming about in Rokkosan Pasture. This includes cows, goats, horses, and sheep.

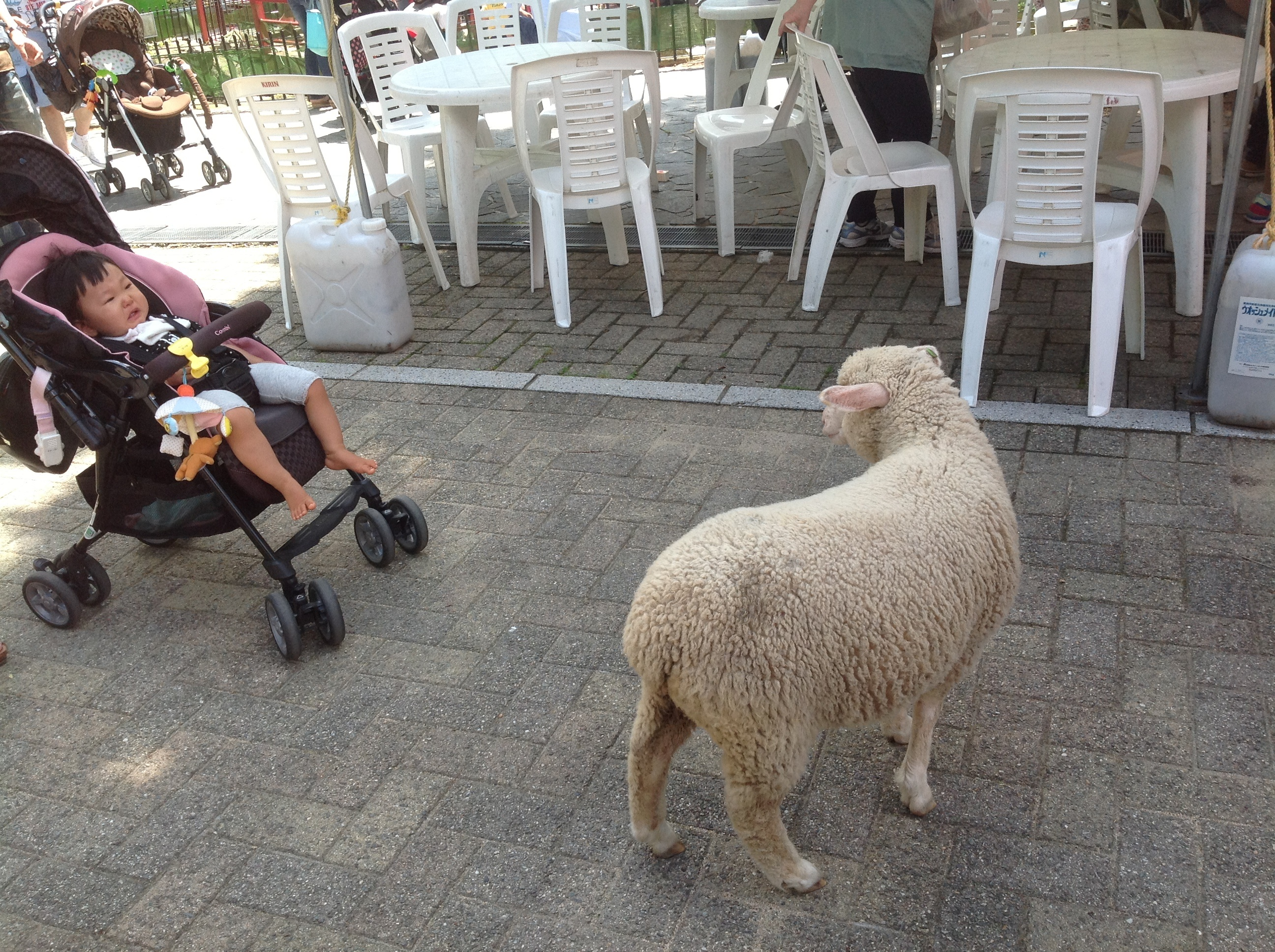
A sheep at the pasture

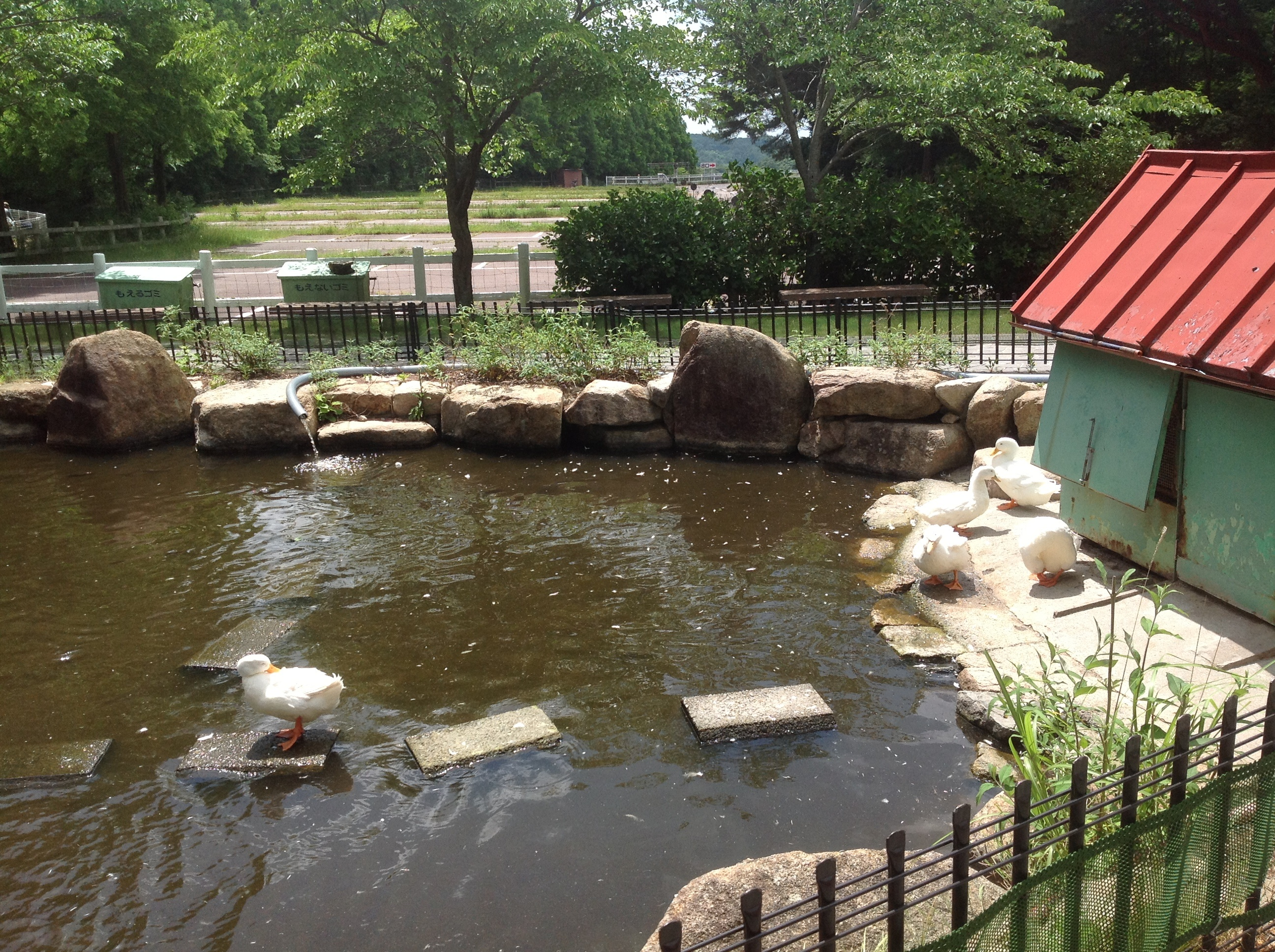
Gaggle of geese at the pasture

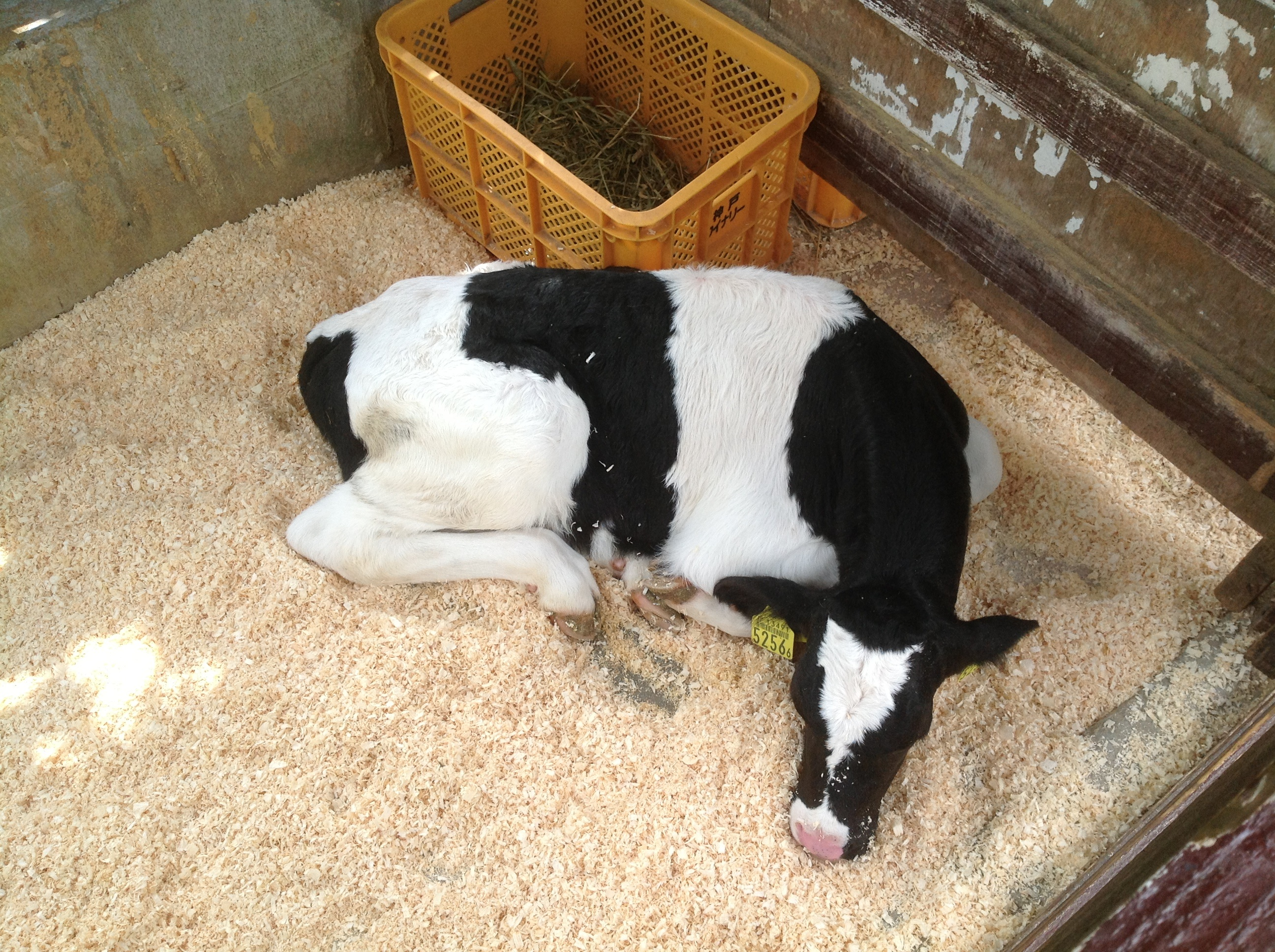
Young cow at the pasture

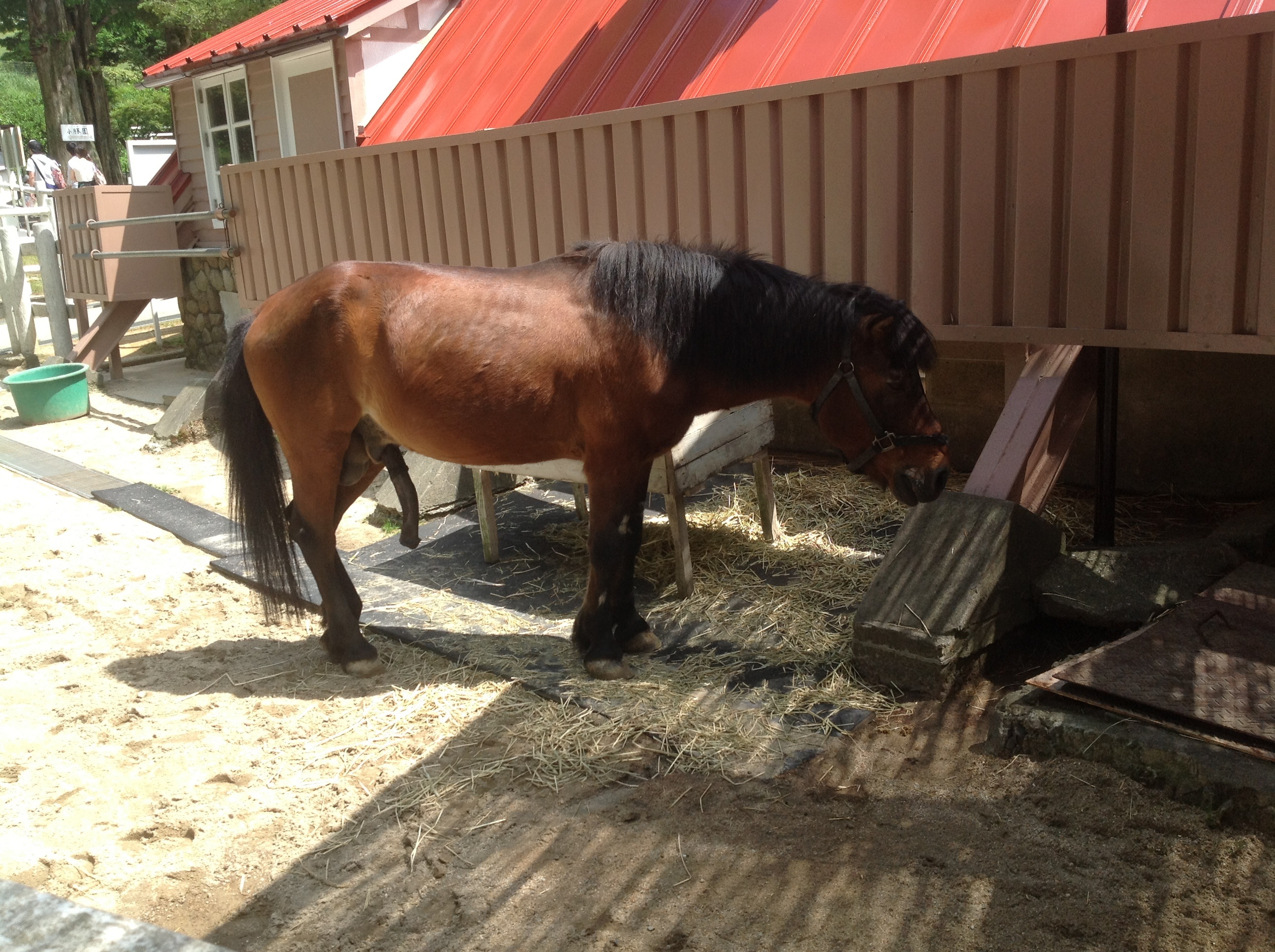
Mature horse at the pasture

== Facilities and geography ==
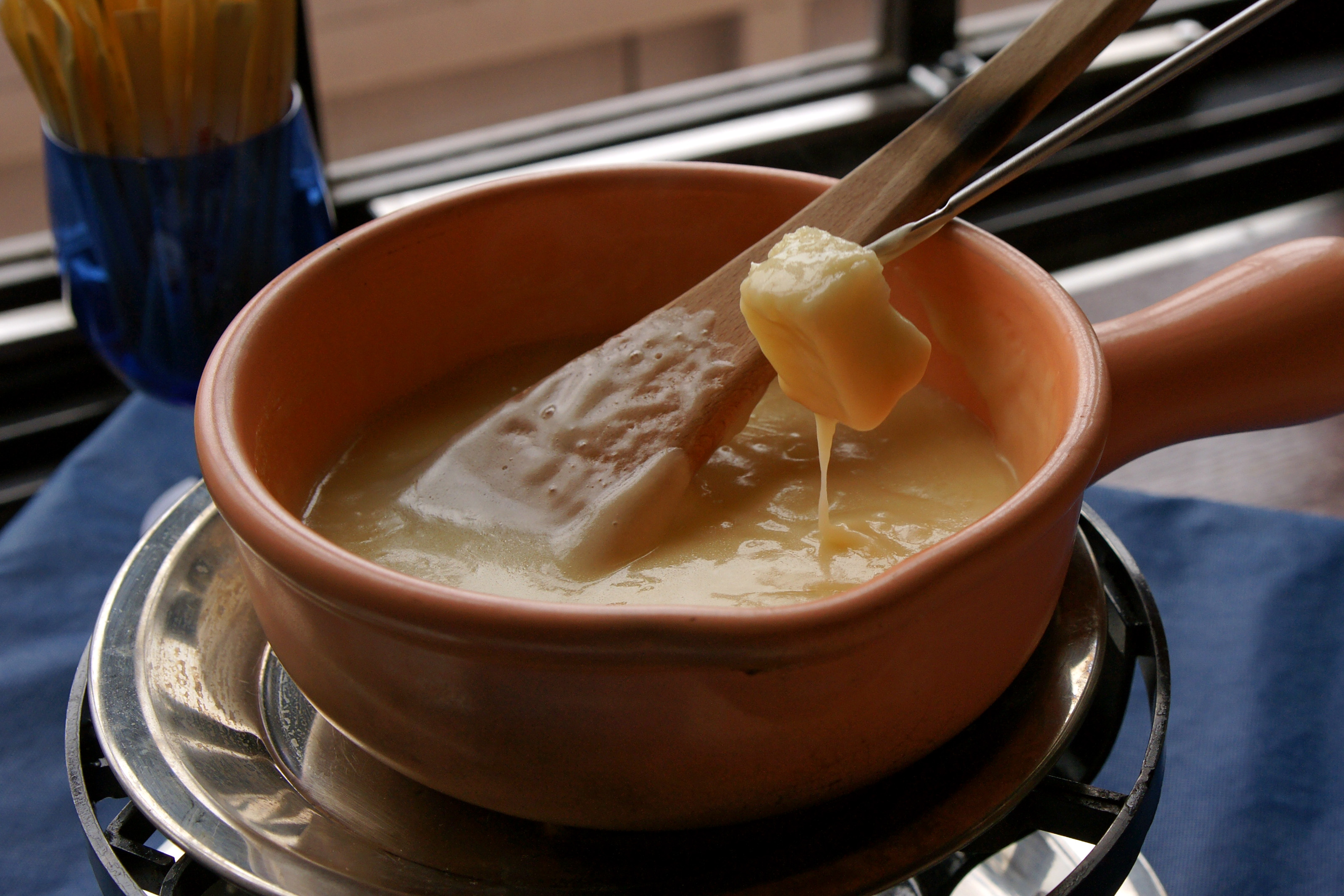
Cheese fondue at one of the pasture's restaurants

There are a few restaurants at the pasture. Horse riding opportunities are available at the pasture. In addition, visitors can have the chance to make their own select food items, including ice cream, as well as feed some of the animals on the farm ground. The Kobe cheese-making process is available for public view. The pasture is a half hour drive from Kobe below Mount Rokkō, and is linked to the mountain's ranch. Rokkosan Pasture can also be reached by cable car.

== Climate ==
The temperature at Rokkosan Pasture is at its highest in August, and at its lowest in both January and February.
