= Mount Rokkō =

Mountain range in Japan

- 六甲山
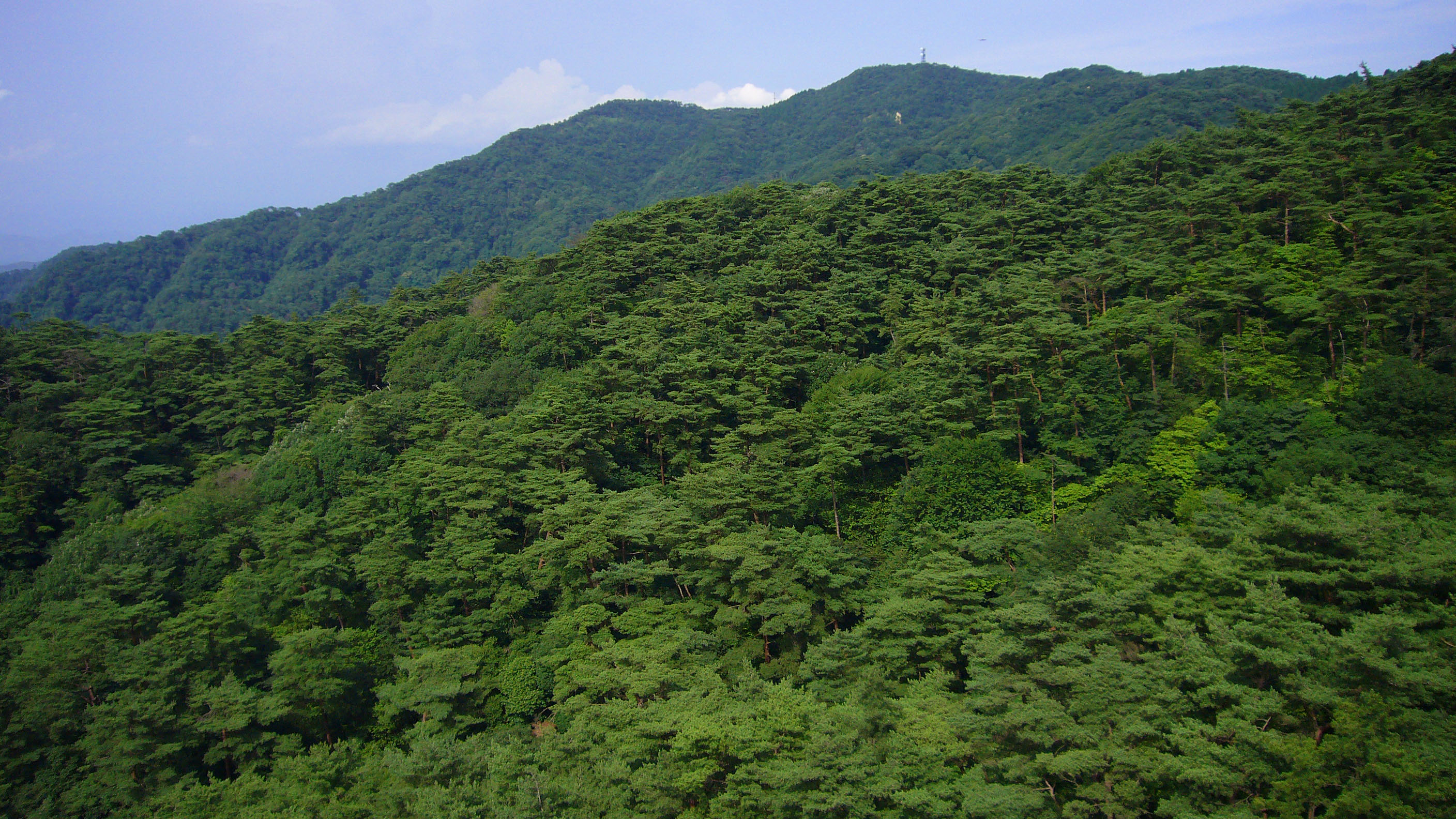

Highest point
- Elevation: 931.6 m (3,056 ft)
- Coordinates: 34°46′40″N 135°15′50″E

Naming
- Language of name: Japanese
- Pronunciation: Japanese: [ɾokkoːsaɴ]

Geography
- Location: Kobe, Hyōgo, Japan
- Parent range: Rokkō Mountains

Geology
- Mountain type: Fault-block

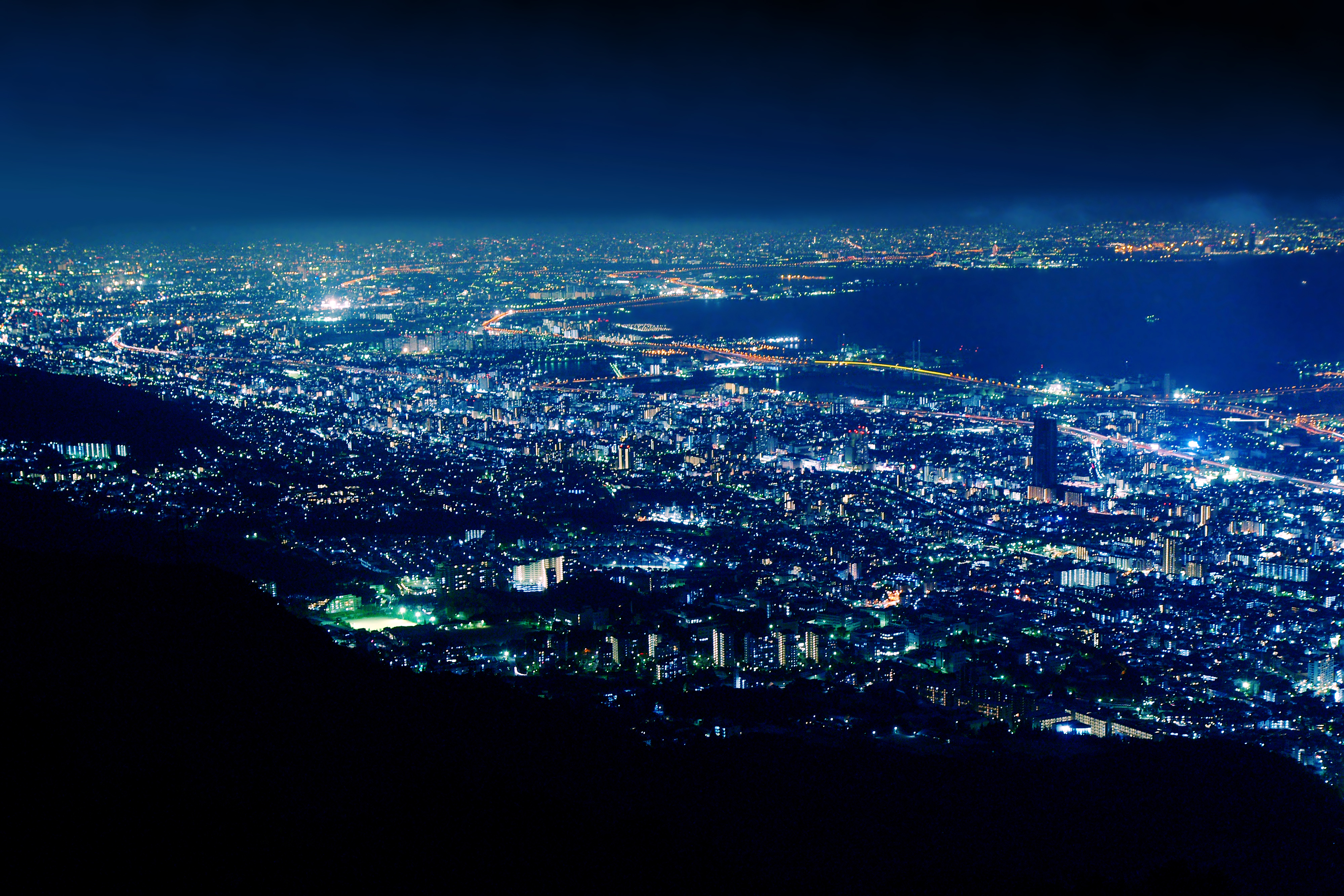
View from Kikuseidai on Mount Maya

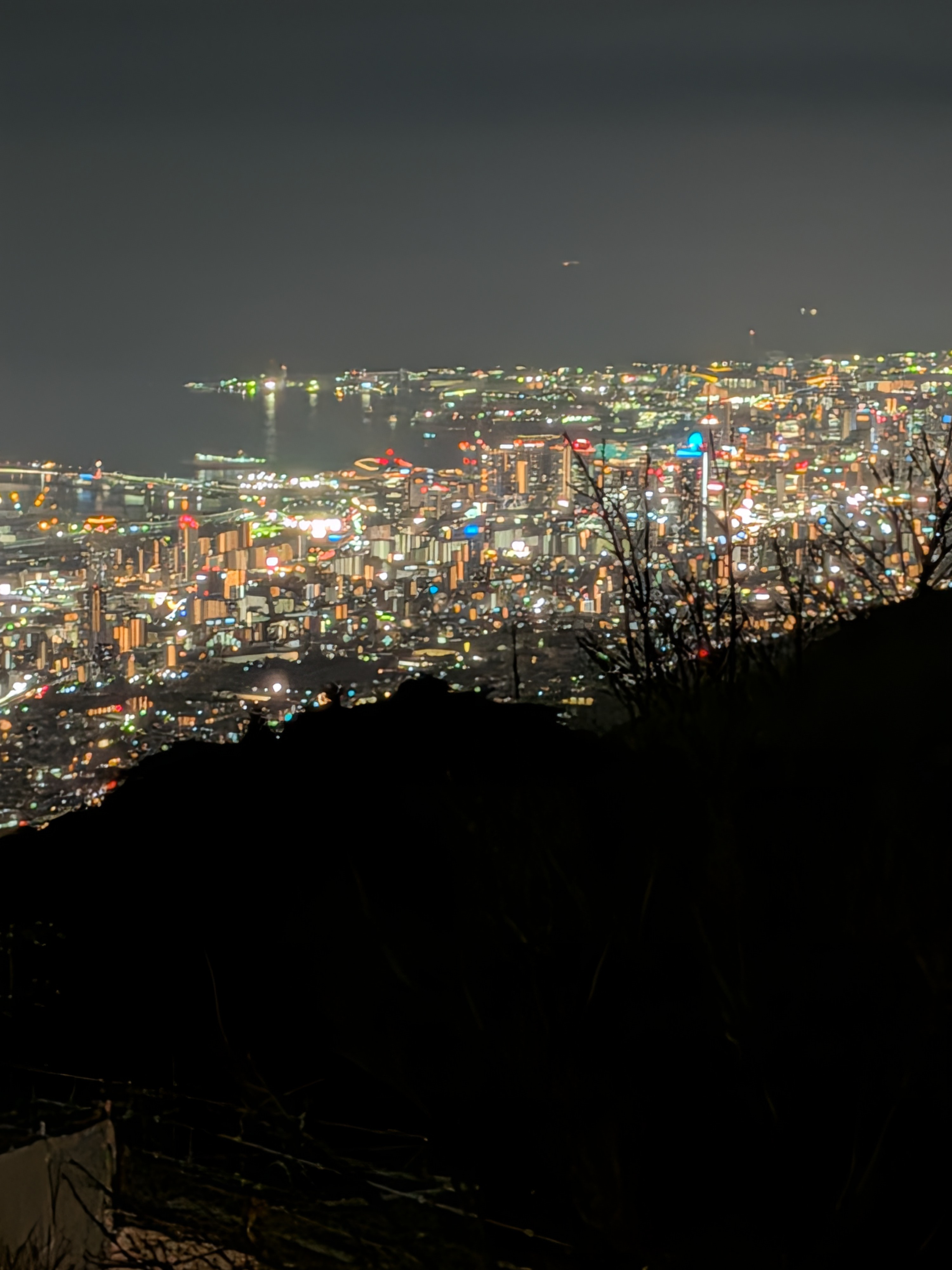
Kobe's night view seen from the garden terrace

Mount Rokkō (六甲山, Rokkō-san) is the name of a range of mountains in southeastern Hyōgo Prefecture, Japan.

== Outline ==
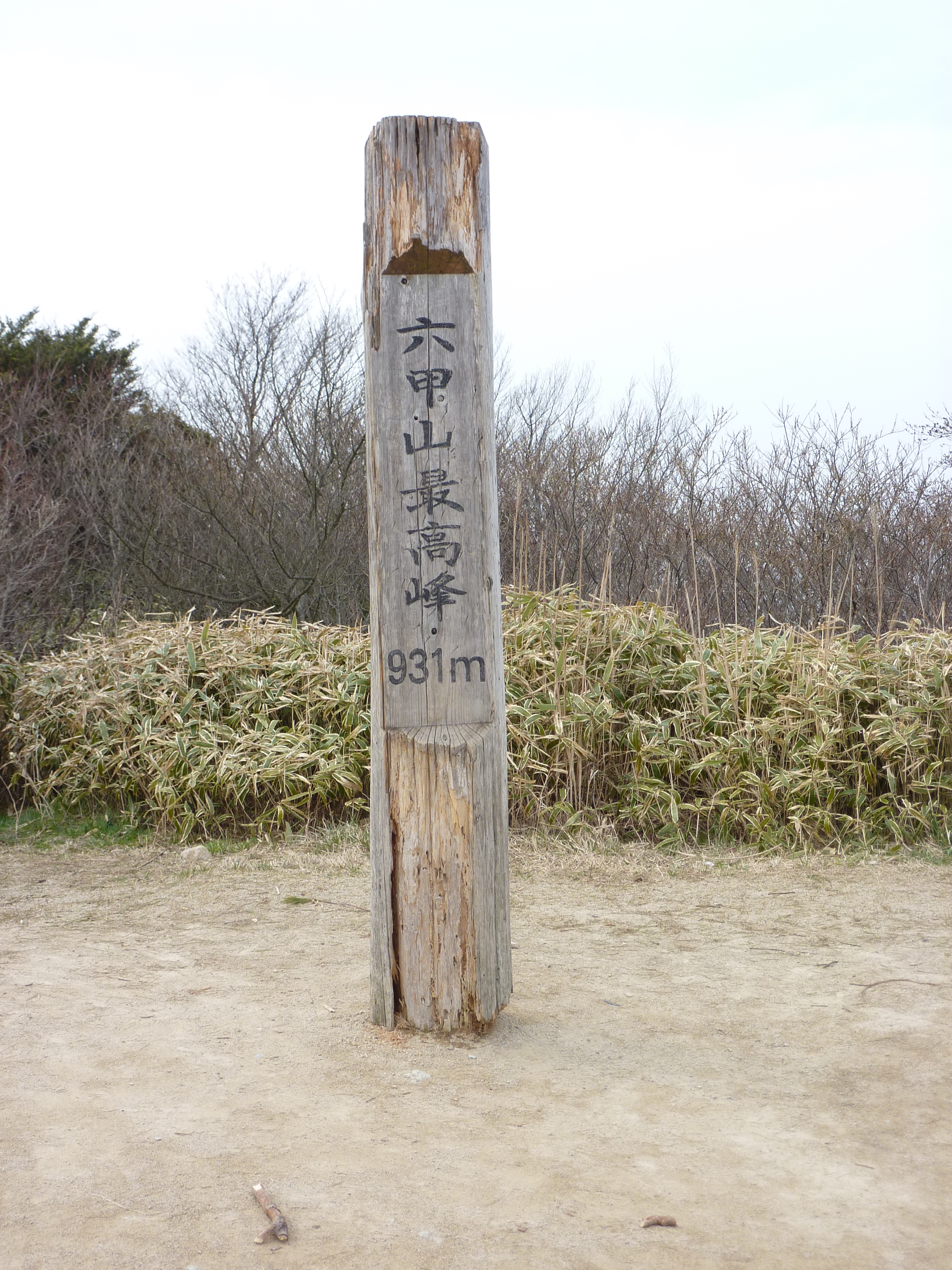
Marker at the highest peak of Mount Rokkō

There is no single mountain or peak called "Rokkō," although the highest peak of the mountains is called Rokkōsan-Saikōhō (六甲山最高峰), (literally, the highest peak of the Rokkō Mountains) and the area to the south is known as the Rokkō area. The mountains run approximately east-west from Sumaura Kōen Park in western Kobe to Takarazuka, and the length of the range is about 56 km (35 mi). The highest point is 932 metres (3,060 ft). It also includes Mount Maya, Mount Kabutoyama, Mount Iwahara and Mount Iwakura.

Today, the Rokkō mountain area is a centerpiece of a popular sightseeing and hiking area for people in the metropolitan Kansai region. Mt. Rokkō is a symbol of Kobe as well as Osaka.

== History ==
Arthur Hasketh Groom opened the first golf course in Japan, Kobe Golf Club, on Mount Rokko in 1903.

Mount Rokkō was the first place to introduce rock climbing to the Japanese by Kuzou Fujiki who established the first rock climbing club in Japan in 1924.

== Points of interest ==
- Rokkō Alpine Botanical Garden
- Nunobiki Herb Garden
- Nunobiki Falls
- Rokko Musicbox Museum
- Rokkosan Pasture
- Kobe Golf Club
- Ashiya Country Club
- Okuike
- East Rokko Observatory/Route Cafe

== In popular culture ==
For many years, lenses made by the Minolta Camera Company, headquartered in Osaka, were named "Rokkor" after the mountains.

The theme song of the baseball team Hanshin Tigers, based in Nishinomiya, is titled "Rokko Oroshi" (六甲おろし; lit. 'Rokko Mountain Wind').

== Access ==
- Rokkō Sanjō Station of Rokkō Cable Line
- Kinenhidai Bus Stop of Hankyu Bus
- Hoshi no Eki Station of Maya Cable

== Gallery ==
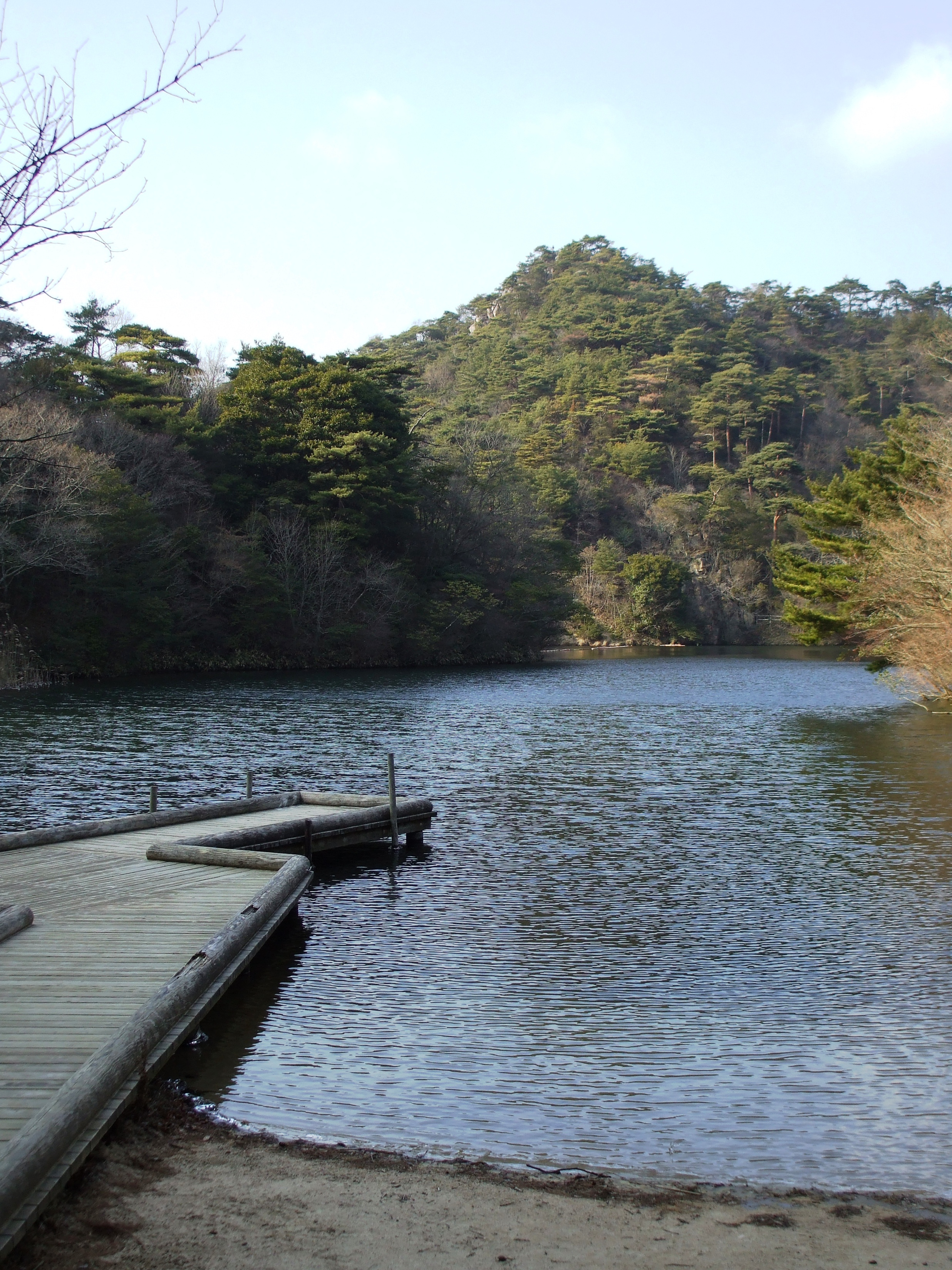
Lake Hotaka

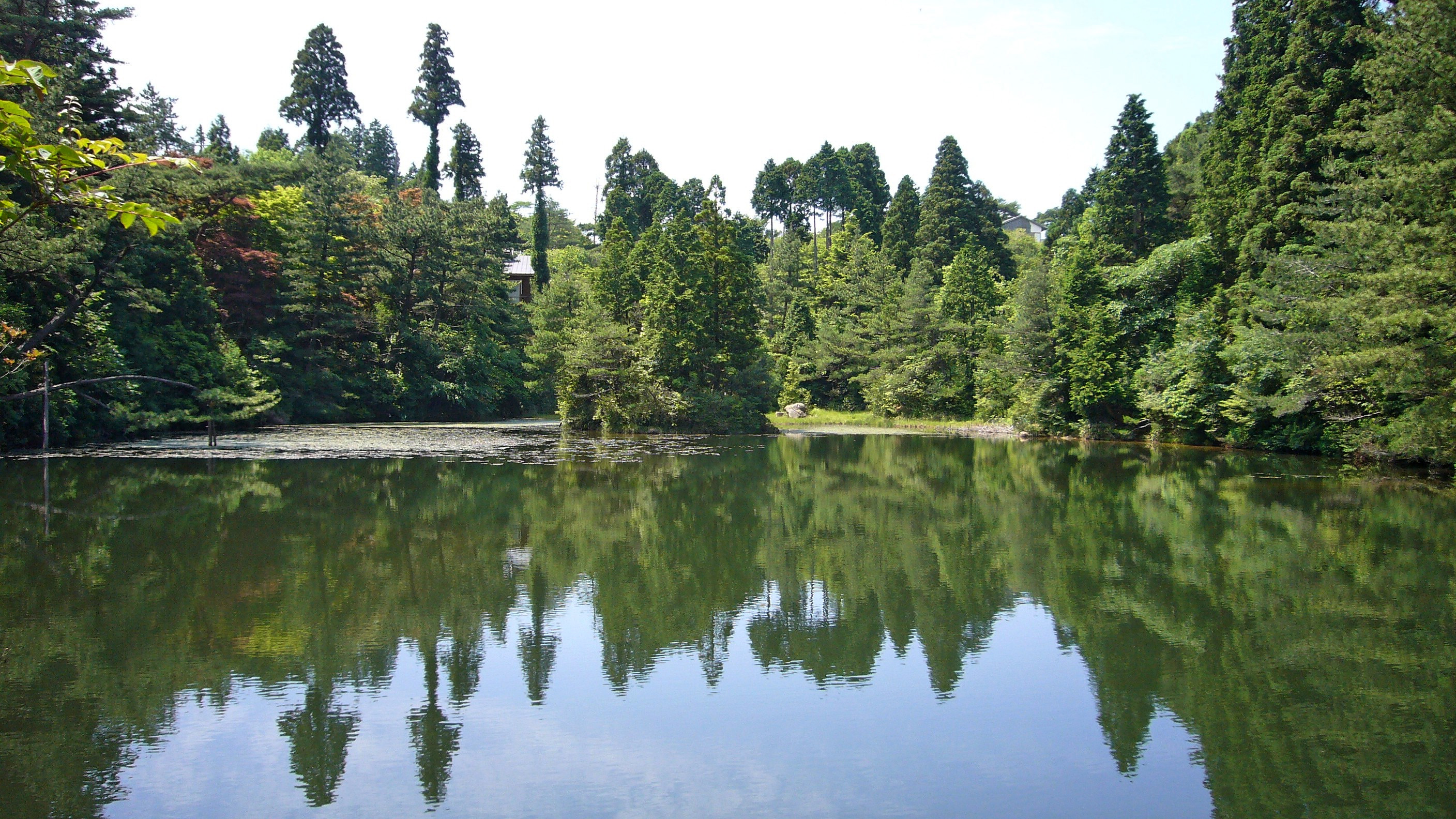
Lake Mikuni

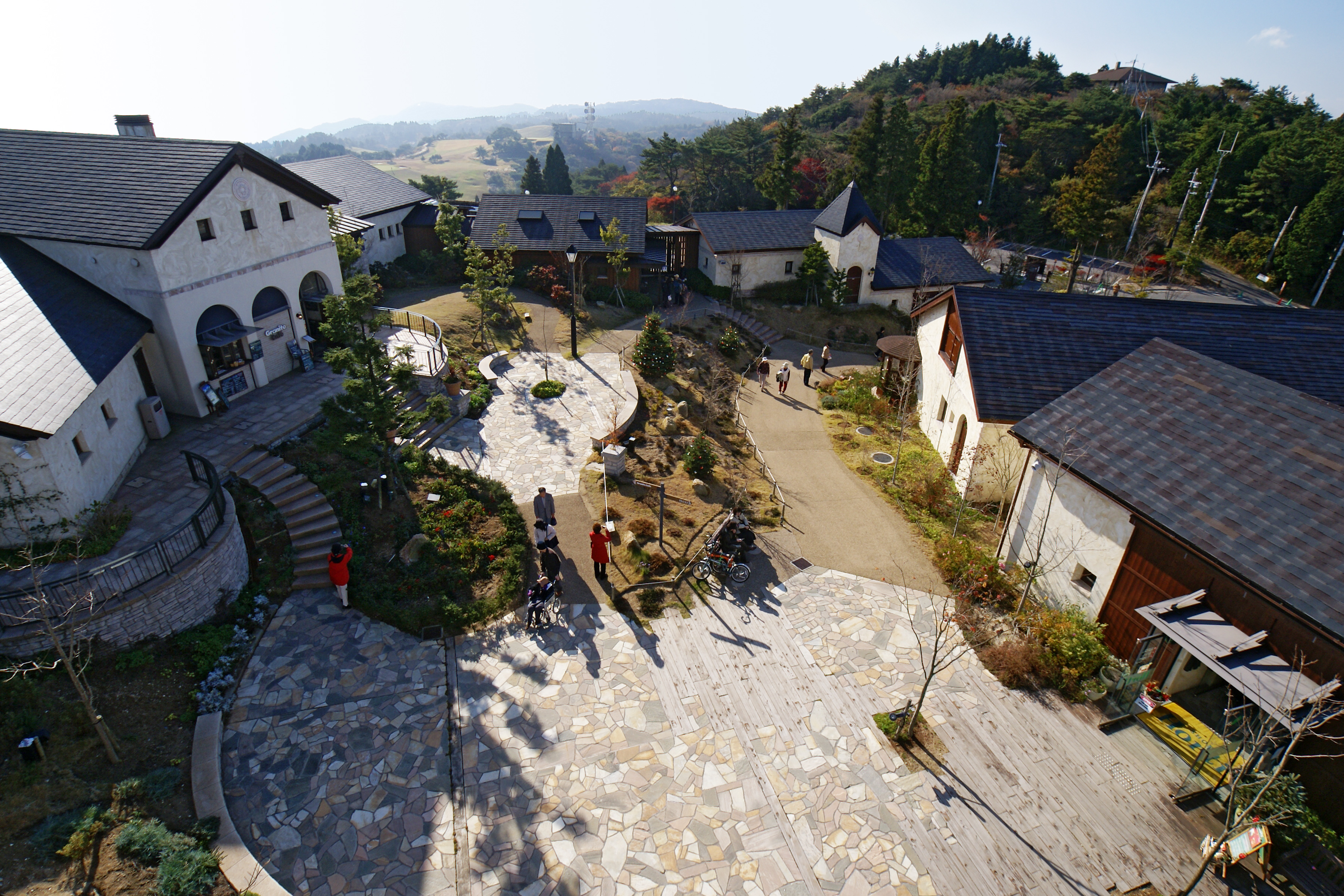
Rokko Garden Terrace

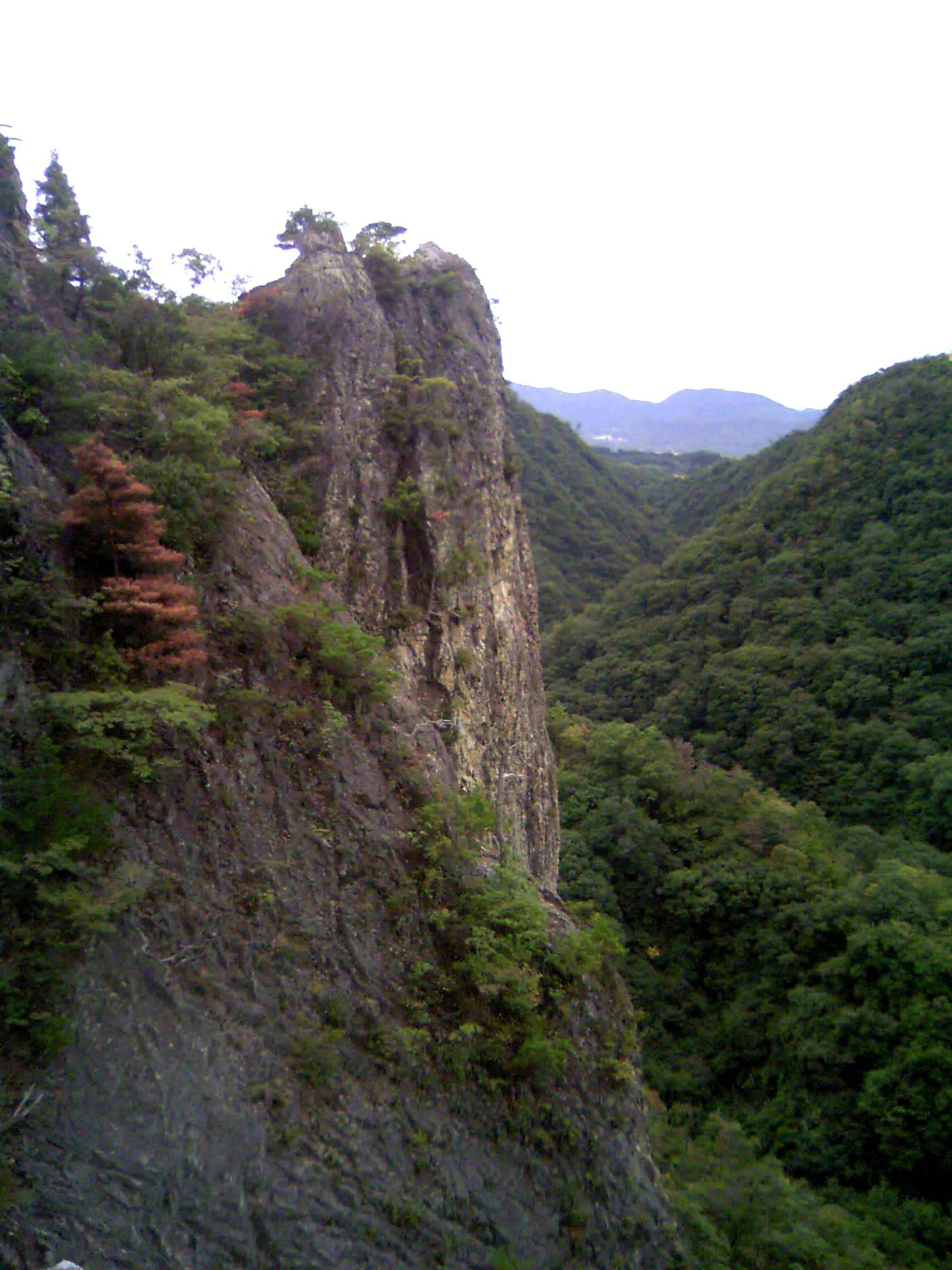
Kamakura Valley

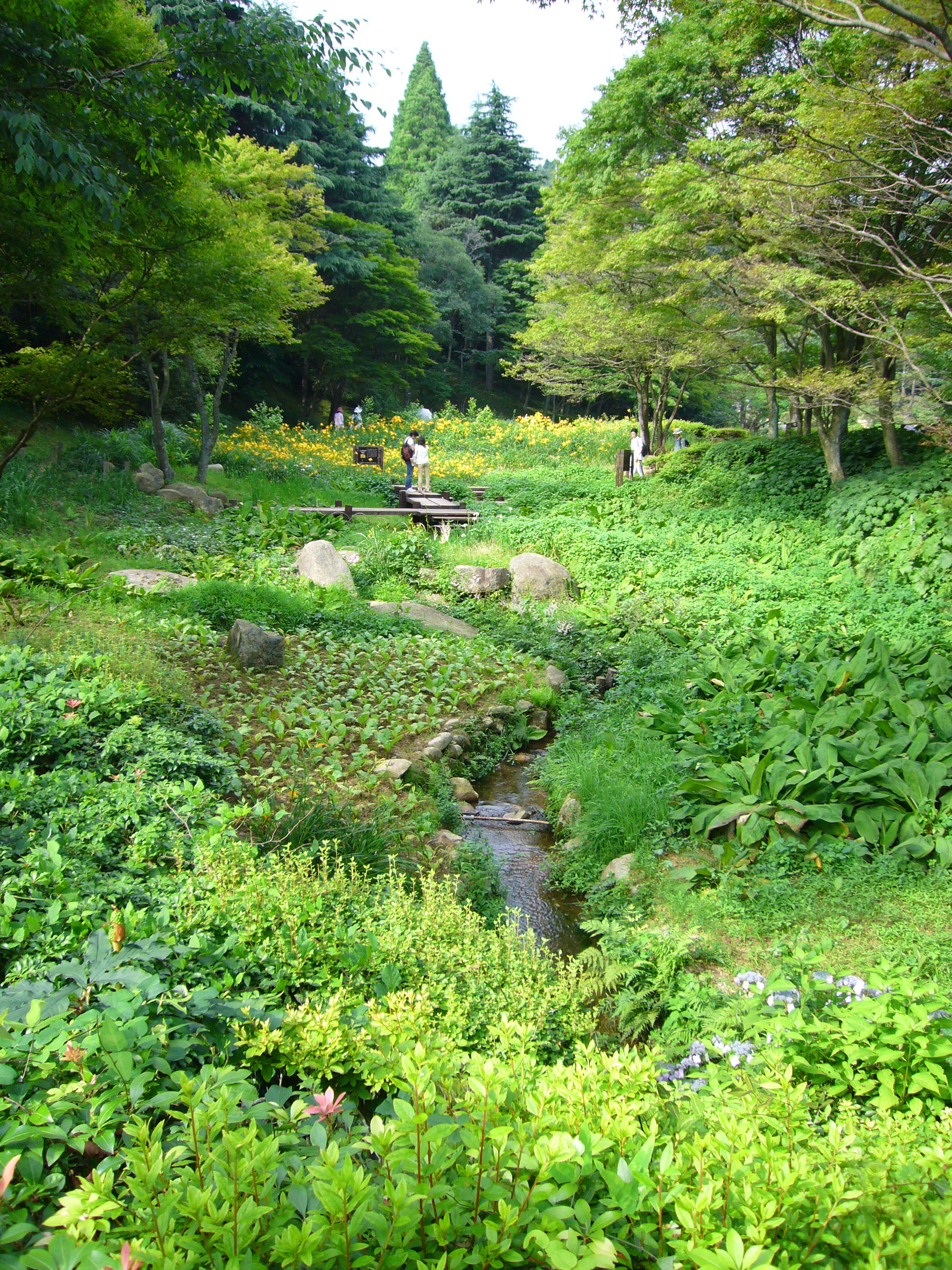
Rokkō Alpine Botanical Garden

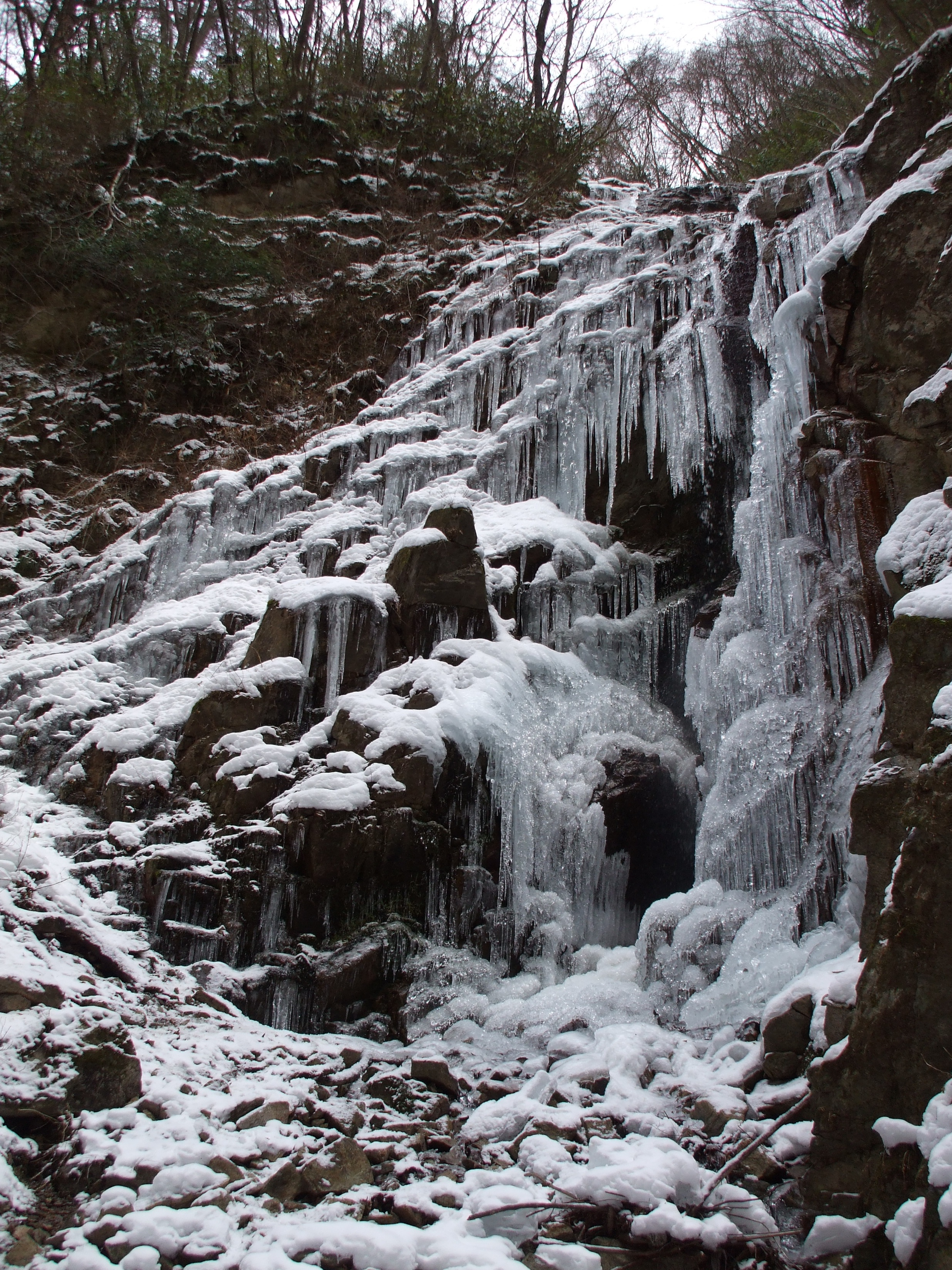
Frozen Nanamagari Waterfall

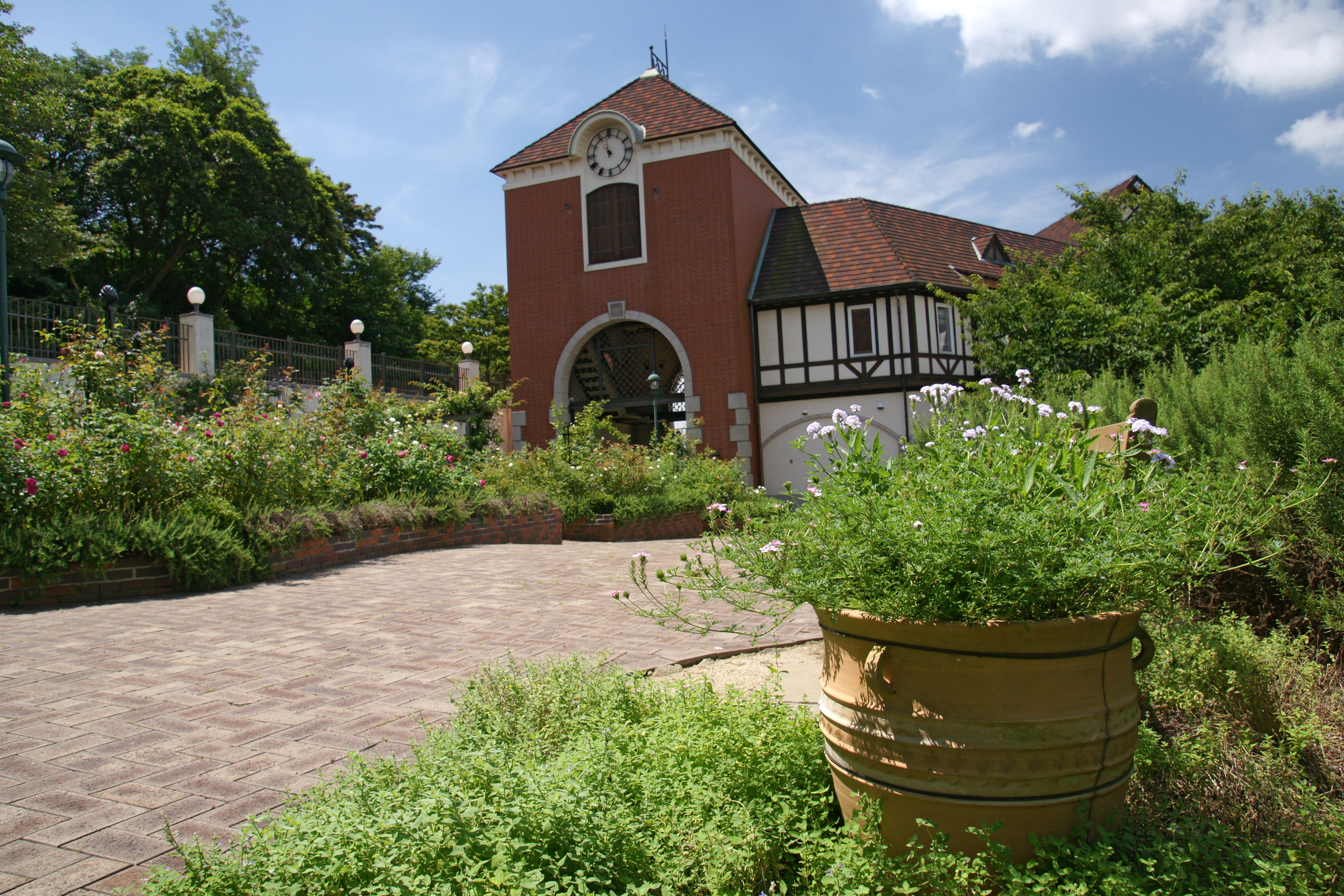
Nunobiki Herb Garden

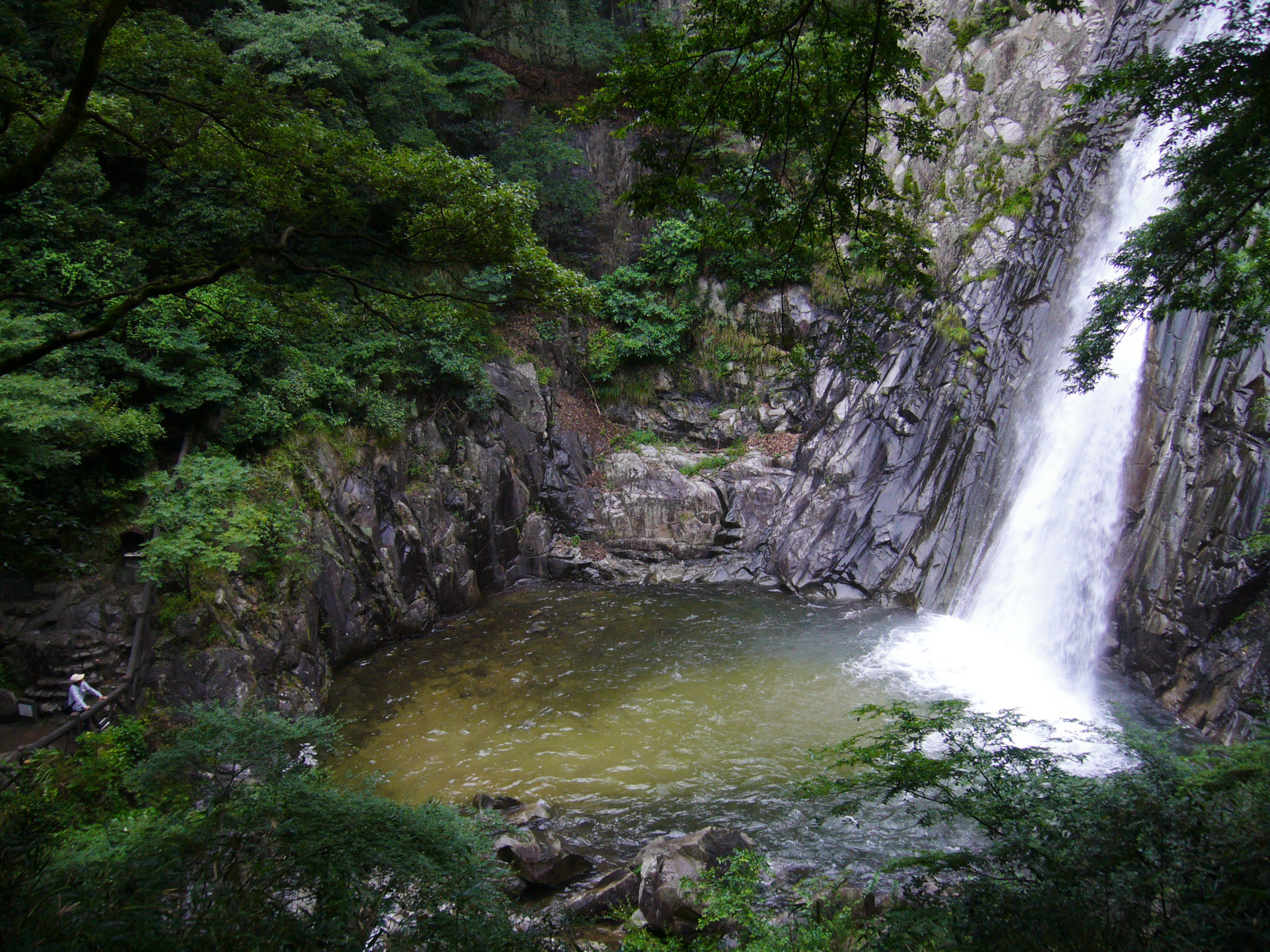
Nunobiki Falls

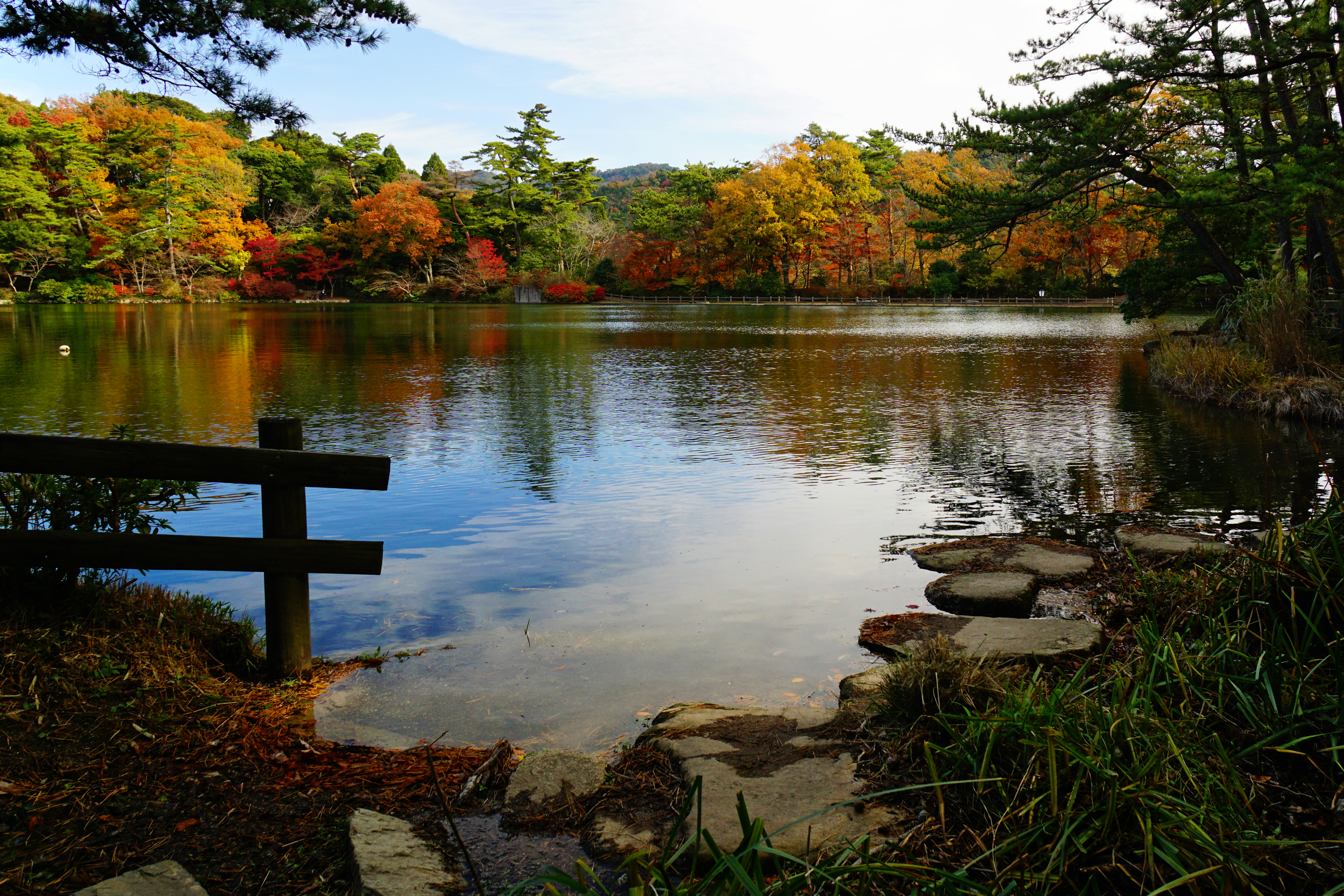
Futatabi Park

== See also ==
- Hōrai Valley
- Kamakura Valley
- Rokkō oroshi - gale blowing down from Mt. Rokkō
- Rokkō oroshi (song)
- Rokkō Island - artificial island south of Kobe
- Listed in The 100 Views of Nature in Kansai
