= Rokkō Alpine Botanical Garden =

Botanical garden on Mount Rokkō, Kobe, Japan

Coordinates: 34°45′45″N 135°14′30″E

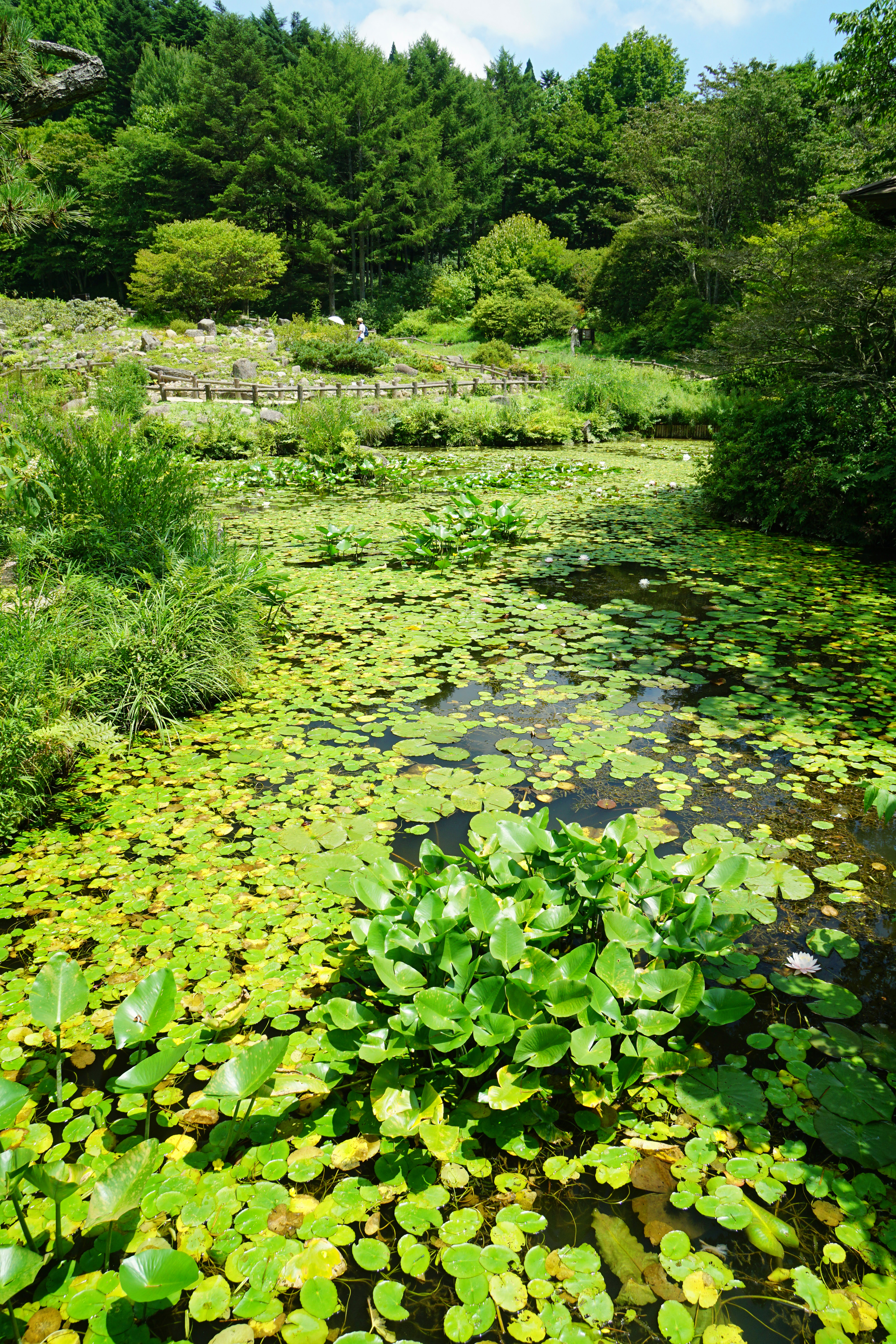
Rokko Alpine Botanical Garden

The Rokkō Alpine Botanical Garden (六甲高山植物園, Rokkō Kōzan Shokubutsu-en) is a botanical garden located on Mount Rokkō, Kobe, Japan.

== Opening season ==
It is open daily in the warmer months, except some Thursdays; an admission fee is charged.

== Layout ==
The garden was established in 1933 at an altitude of 865 meters near the peak of Mount Rokkō. It currently contains about 1,500 kinds of alpine plants from Japan and the Himalayas, including dicentra, edelweiss, skunk cabbage, and native wild plants.

== See also ==
- Kobe Municipal Arboretum (nearby)
- List of botanical gardens in Japan
