= Kamakura Valley =

- 鎌倉峡
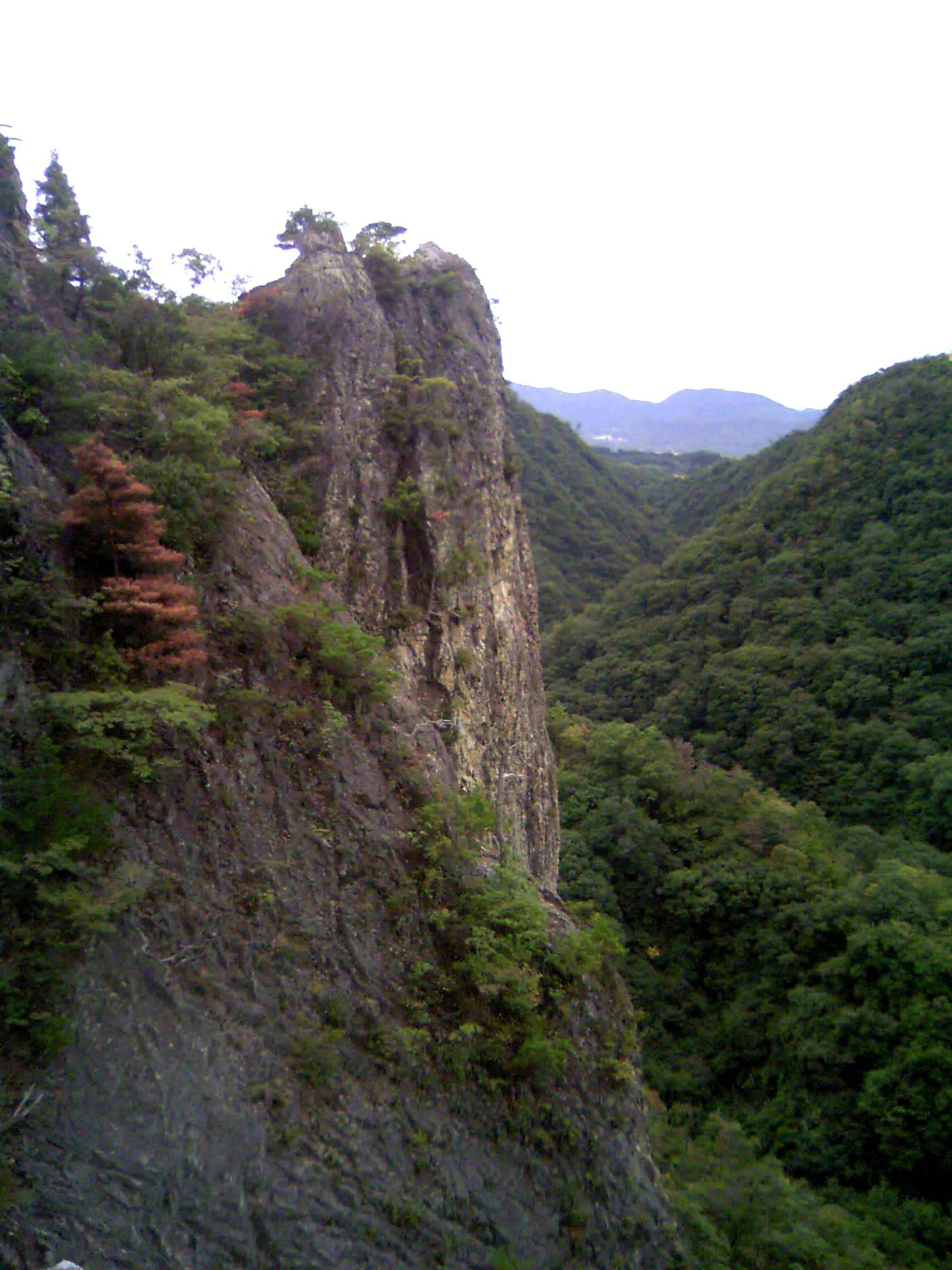
- Hyakujo Rock at Kamakura Valley (September 2008)

Highest point
- Elevation: 292.2 m (959 ft)(Hyakujo Rock)
- Coordinates: 34°51′17″N 135°15′22″E

Naming
- Language of name: Japanese
- Pronunciation: Japanese: [kamakɯɾa kʲoː]

Geography
- Location: Nishinomiya, Hyōgo, Japan
- Parent range: Rokko Mountains

The Kamakurakyo (鎌倉峡, Kamakura-kyō) is a geographical area that is located in the Rokko Mountains, Hyōgo, Japan. This valley is a part of Setonaikai National Park in Japan.

== History ==
The name of Kamakura Valley originated from a historical anecdote: In the 13th century, Hōjō Tokiyori, the Shikken, or regent, for the shōgun, visited this valley and praised the beauty.

== Geography ==
This valley is along the Funazaka River, which is a branch of the Muko River. The length of the valley is about two kilometers. This valley was made by the river, which eroded the liparite stone, resulting the tall cliff faces along the river. This valley has the famous Hyakujo Rock, which is a land mark and a popular climbing spot.

== Route ==
- Dōjō Station of Fukuchiyama Line

== Gallery ==
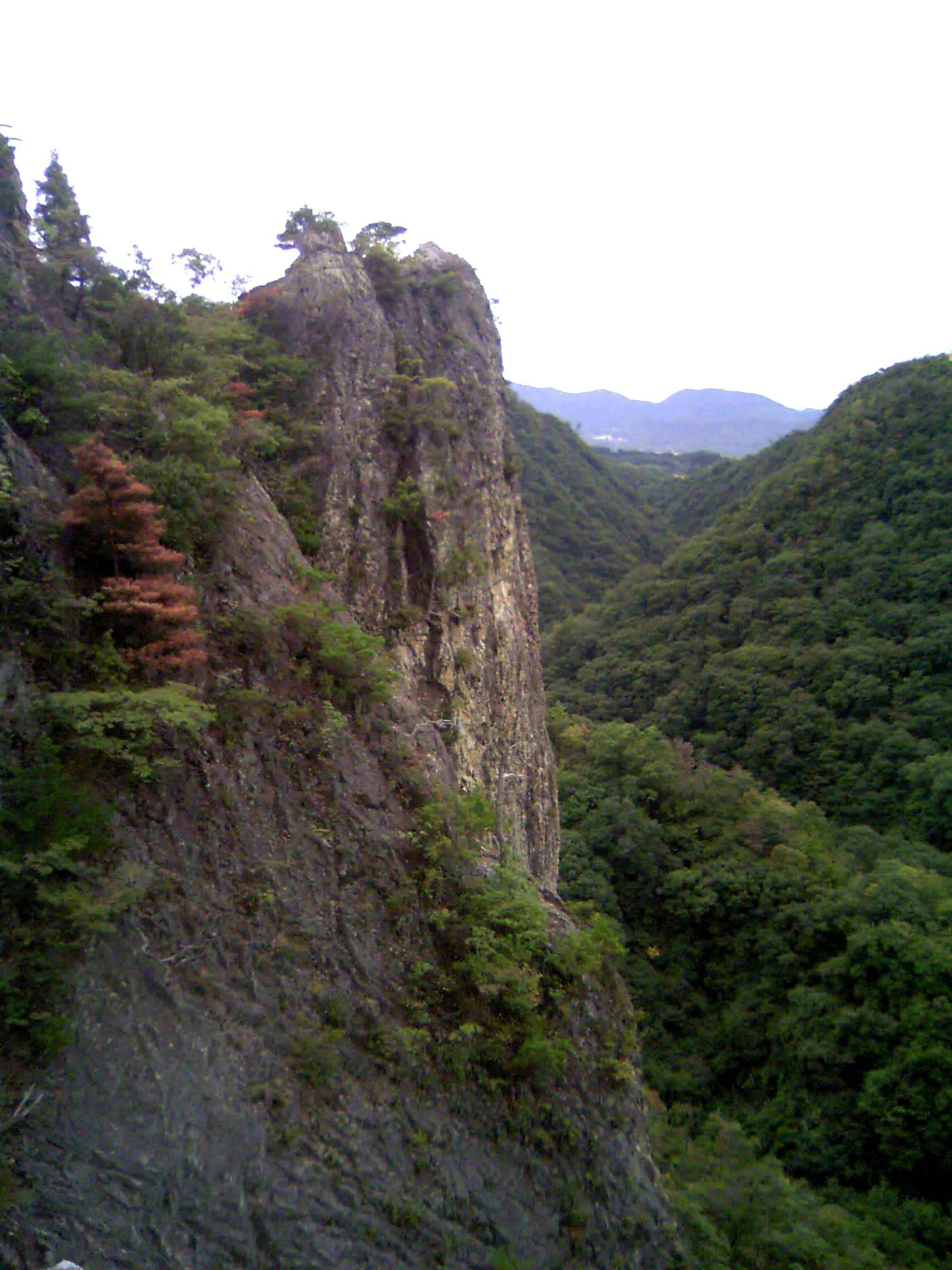
Hyakujoiwa Rock from south (September 2008)

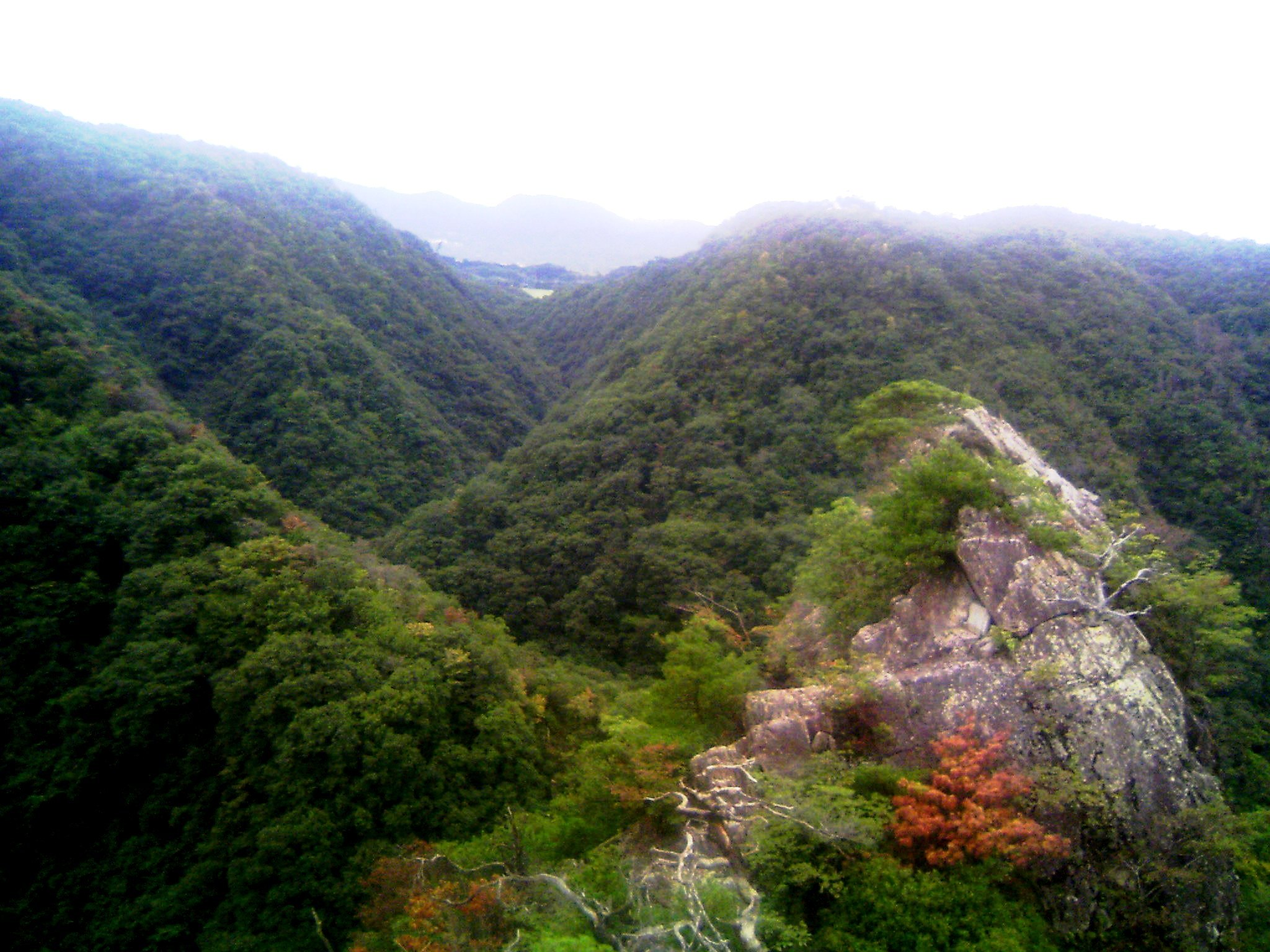
A View from Hyakujoiwa (1) (September 2008)

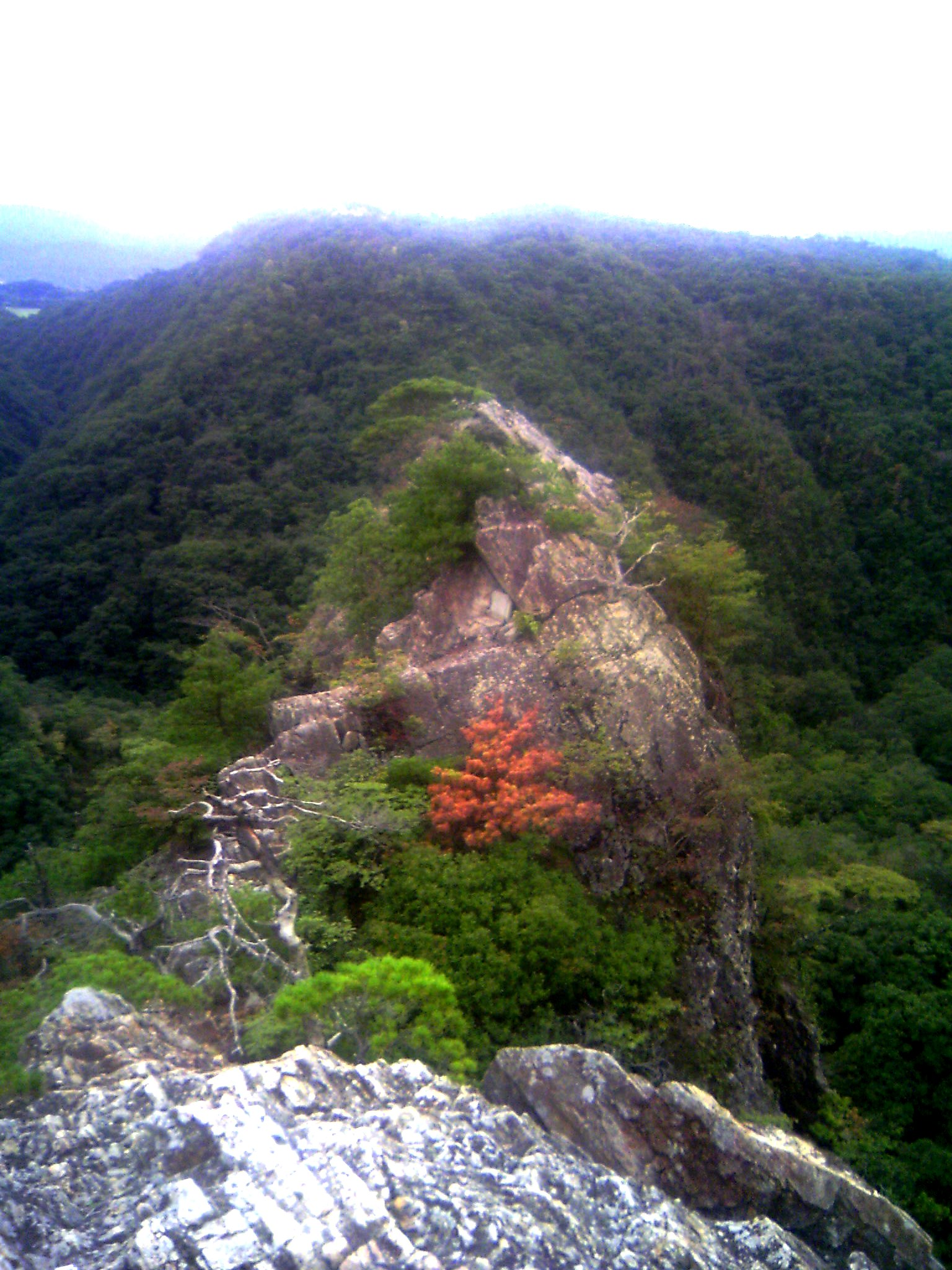
A View from Hyakujoiwa (2) (September 2008)

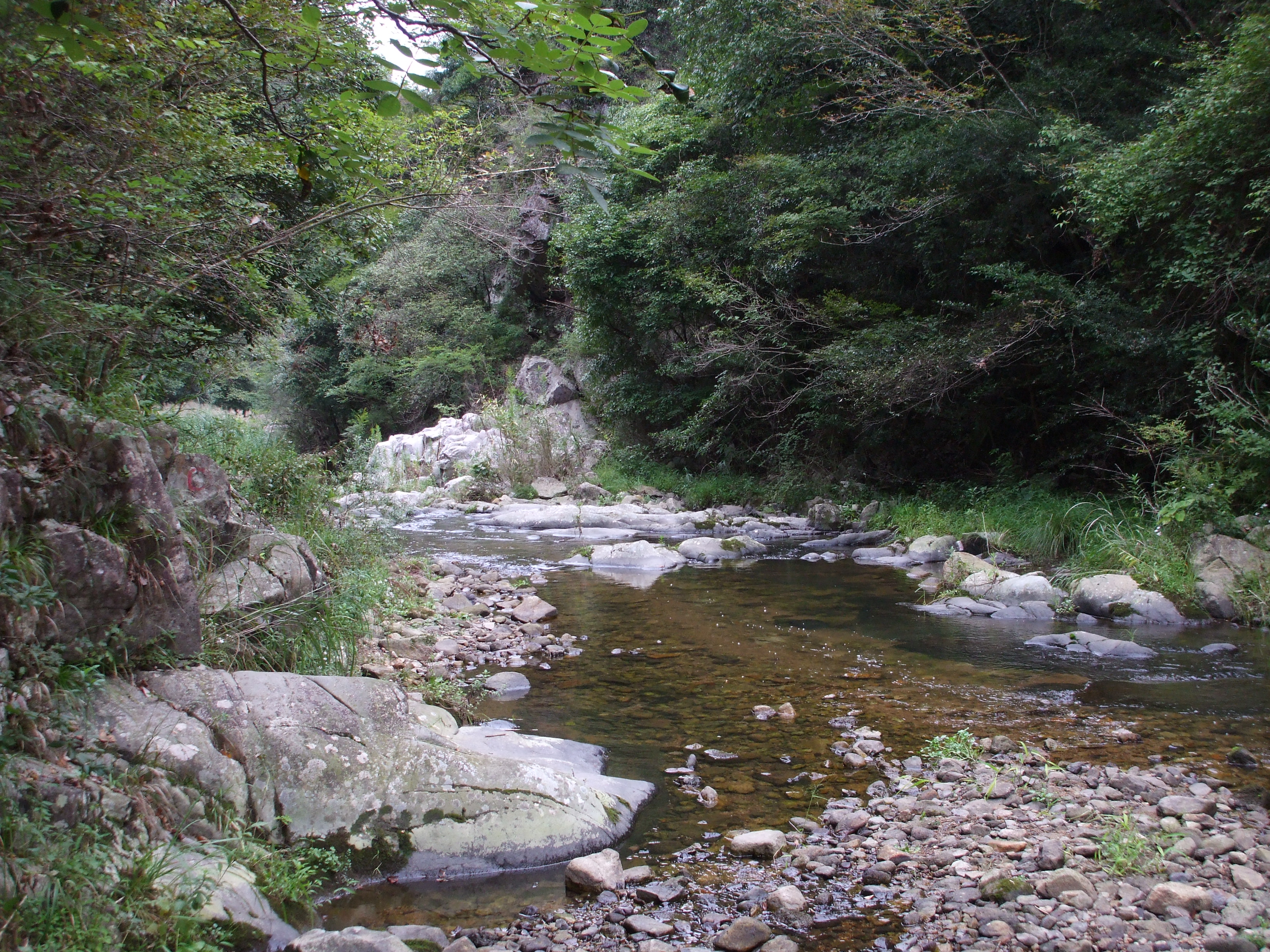
A scene of Kamakura Valley (September 2008)
