= Japanese dry garden =

Type of Japanese garden

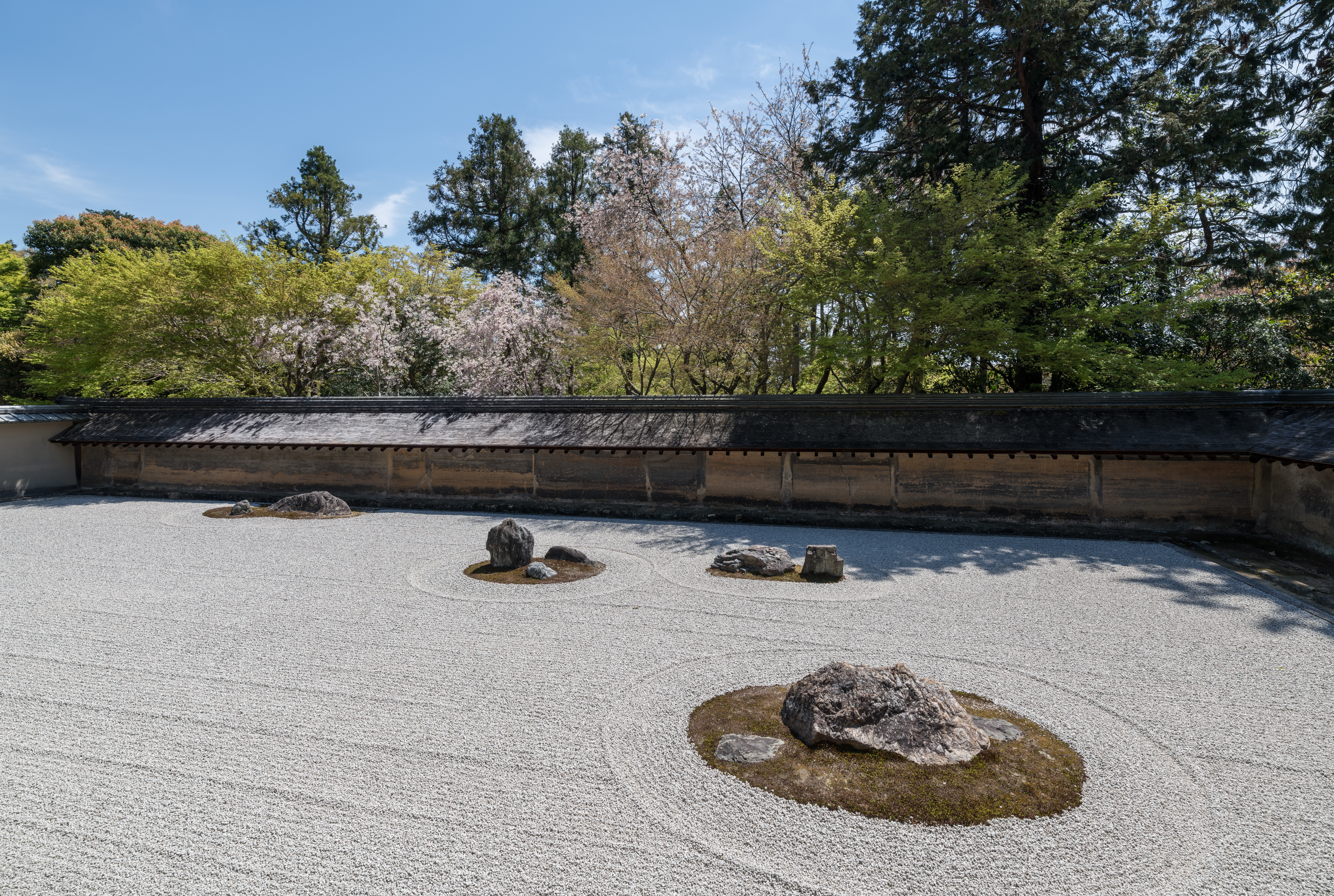
Ryōan-ji (late 16th century) in Kyoto, Japan, a famous example of a Zen garden

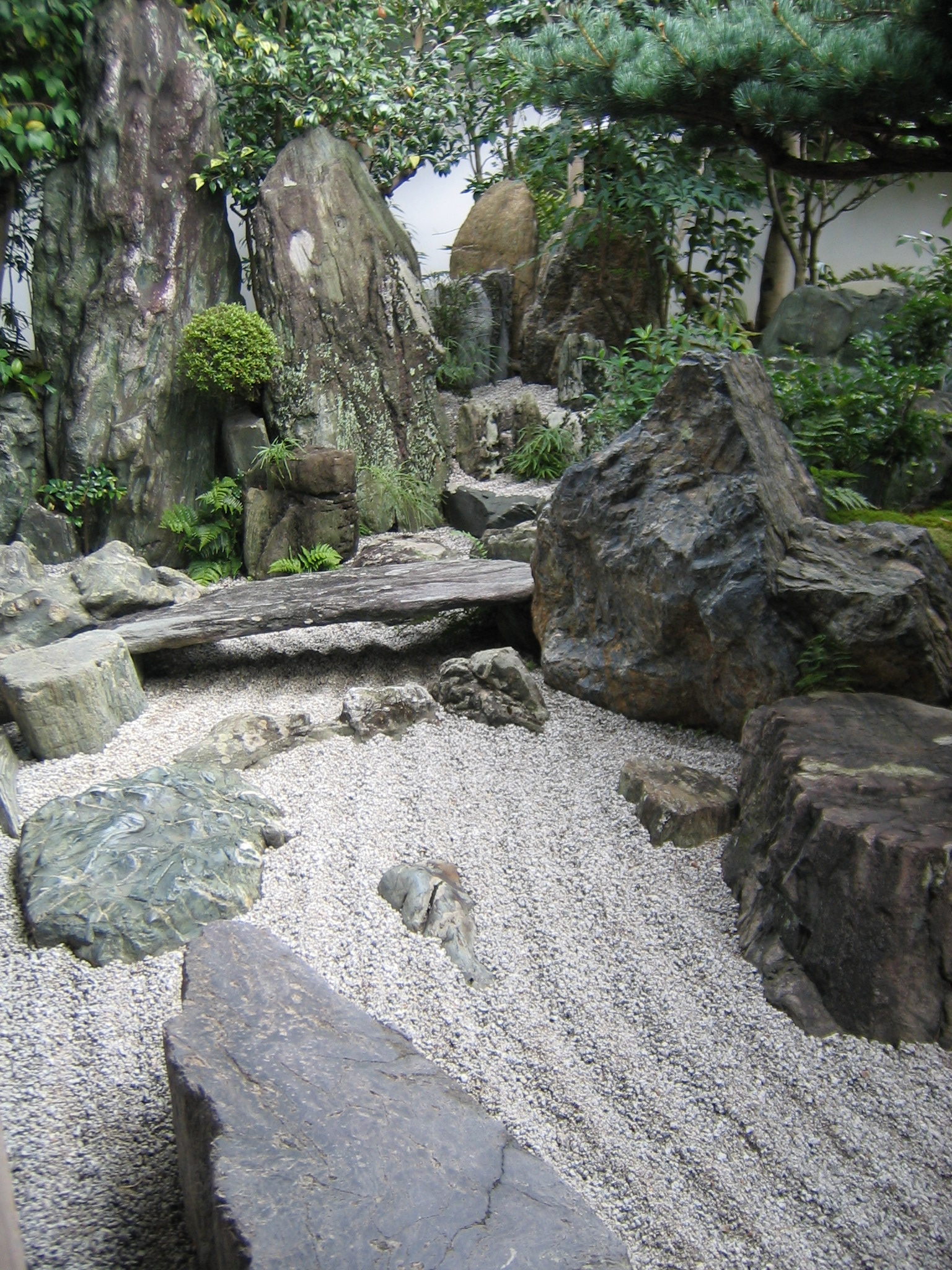
A mountain, waterfall, and gravel "river" at Daisen-in (1509–1513)

The Japanese dry garden (枯山水, karesansui) or Japanese rock garden, often called a Zen garden, is a distinctive style of Japanese garden. It creates a miniature stylized landscape through carefully composed arrangements of rocks, water features, moss, pruned trees and bushes, and uses gravel or sand that is raked to represent ripples in water. Zen gardens are commonly found at temples or monasteries. A Zen garden is usually relatively small, surrounded by a wall or buildings, and is usually meant to be seen while seated from a single viewpoint outside the garden, such as the porch of the hojo, the residence of the chief monk of the temple or monastery. Many, with gravel rather than grass, are only stepped into for maintenance. Classical Zen gardens were created at temples of Zen Buddhism in Kyoto during the Muromachi period. They were intended to imitate the essence of nature, not its actual appearance, and to serve as an aid for meditation.

== History ==
=== Early Japanese rock gardens ===
Stone gardens existed in Japan at least since the Heian period (794–1185). These early gardens were described in the first manual of Japanese gardens, Sakuteiki ("Records of Garden Keeping"), written at the end of the 11th century by Tachibana no Toshitsuna (1028–1094). They adapted the Chinese garden philosophy of the Song dynasty (960–1279), where groups of rocks symbolized Mount Penglai, the legendary mountain-island home of the Eight Immortals in Chinese mythology, known in Japanese as Horai. The Sakuteiki described exactly how rocks should be placed. In one passage, he wrote:

"In a place where there is neither a lake or a stream, one can put in place what is called a kare-sansui, or dry landscape". This kind of garden featured either rocks placed upright like mountains, or laid out in a miniature landscape of hills and ravines, with few plants. He described several other styles of rock garden, which usually included a stream or pond, including the great river style, the mountain river style, and the marsh style. The ocean style featured rocks that appeared to have been eroded by waves, surrounded by a bank of white sand, like a beach.

White sand and gravel had long been a feature of Japanese gardens. In the Shinto religion, it was used to symbolize purity, and was used around shrines, temples, and palaces. In Zen gardens, it represents water, or, like the white space in Japanese paintings, emptiness and distance. They are places of meditation.

=== Zen Buddhism and the Muromachi period (1336–1573) ===
The Muromachi period in Japan, which took place at roughly the same time as the Renaissance in Europe, was characterized by political rivalries which frequently led to wars, but also by an extraordinary flourishing of Japanese culture. It saw the beginning of Noh theater, the Japanese tea ceremony, the shoin style of Japanese architecture, and the Zen garden.

Zen Buddhism was introduced into Japan at the end of the 12th century, and quickly achieved a wide following, particularly among the Samurai class and war lords, who admired its doctrine of self-discipline. The gardens of the early Zen temples in Japan resembled Chinese gardens of the time, with lakes and islands. But in Kyoto in the 14th and 15th century, a new kind of garden appeared at the important Zen temples. These Zen gardens were designed to stimulate meditation. "Nature, if you made it expressive by reducing it to its abstract forms, could transmit the most profound thoughts by its simple presence", Michel Baridon wrote. "The compositions of stone, already common in China, became in Japan, veritable petrified landscapes, which seemed suspended in time, as in certain moments of Noh theater, which dates to the same period."

The first garden to begin the transition to the new style is considered by many experts to be Saihō-ji, "The Temple of the Perfumes of the West", popularly known as Koke-dera, the Moss Temple, in the western part of Kyoto. The Buddhist monk and Zen master Musō Kokushi transformed a Buddhist temple into a Zen monastery in 1334, and built the gardens. The lower garden of Saihō-ji is in the traditional Heian period style; a pond with several rock compositions representing islands. The upper garden is a dry rock garden which features three rock "islands". The first, called Kameshima, the island of the turtle, resembles a turtle swimming in a "lake" of moss. The second, Zazen-seki, is a flat "meditation rock," which is believed to radiate calm and silence; and the third is the kare-taki, a dry "waterfall" composed of a stairway of flat granite rocks. The moss which now surrounds the rocks and represents water, was not part of the original garden plan; it grew several centuries later when the garden was left untended, but now is the most famous feature of the garden.

Muso Kokushi built another temple garden at Tenryū-ji, the "Temple of the Celestial Dragon". This garden appears to have been strongly influenced by Chinese landscape painting of the Song dynasty, which feature mountains rising in the mist, and a suggestion of great depth and height. The garden at Tenryū-ji has a real pond with water and a dry waterfall of rocks looking like a Chinese landscape. Saihō-ji and Tenryū-ji show the transition from the Heian style garden toward a more abstract and stylized view of nature.

The gardens of Ginkaku-ji, also known as the Silver Pavilion, are also attributed to Muso Kokushi. This temple garden included a traditional pond garden, but it had a new feature for a Japanese garden; an area of raked white gravel with a perfectly shaped mountain of white gravel, resembling Mount Fuji, in the center. The scene was called ginshanada, literally "sand of silver and open sea". This garden feature became known as kogetsudai, or small mountain facing the Moon, and similar small Mount Fuji made of sand or earth covered with grass appeared in Japanese gardens for centuries afterwards.

The most famous of all Zen gardens in Kyoto is Ryōan-ji, built in the late 15th century where for the first time the Zen garden became purely abstract. The garden is a rectangle of 340 square meters. Placed within it are fifteen stones of different sizes, carefully composed in five groups; one group of five stones, two groups of three, and two groups of two stones. The stones are surrounded by white gravel, which is carefully raked each day by the monks. The only vegetation in the garden is some moss around the stones. The garden is meant to be viewed from a seated position on the veranda of the hōjō, the residence of the abbot of the monastery.

The garden at Daisen-in (1509–1513) took a more literary approach than Ryōan-ji. There a "river" of white gravel represents a metaphorical journey through life; beginning with a dry waterfall in the mountains, passing through rapids and rocks, and ending in a tranquil sea of white gravel, with two gravel mountains.

The invention of the Zen garden was closely connected with developments in Japanese ink landscape paintings. Japanese painters such as Sesshū Tōyō (1420–1506) and Soami (died 1525) greatly simplified their views of nature, showing only the most essential aspects of nature, leaving great areas of white around the black and gray drawings. Soami is said to have been personally involved in the design of two of the most famous Zen gardens in Kyoto, Ryōan-ji and Daisen-in, though his involvement has never been documented with certainty.

Michel Baridon wrote, "The famous Zen gardens of the Muromachi period showed that Japan had carried the art of gardens to the highest degree of intellectual refinement that it was possible to attain."

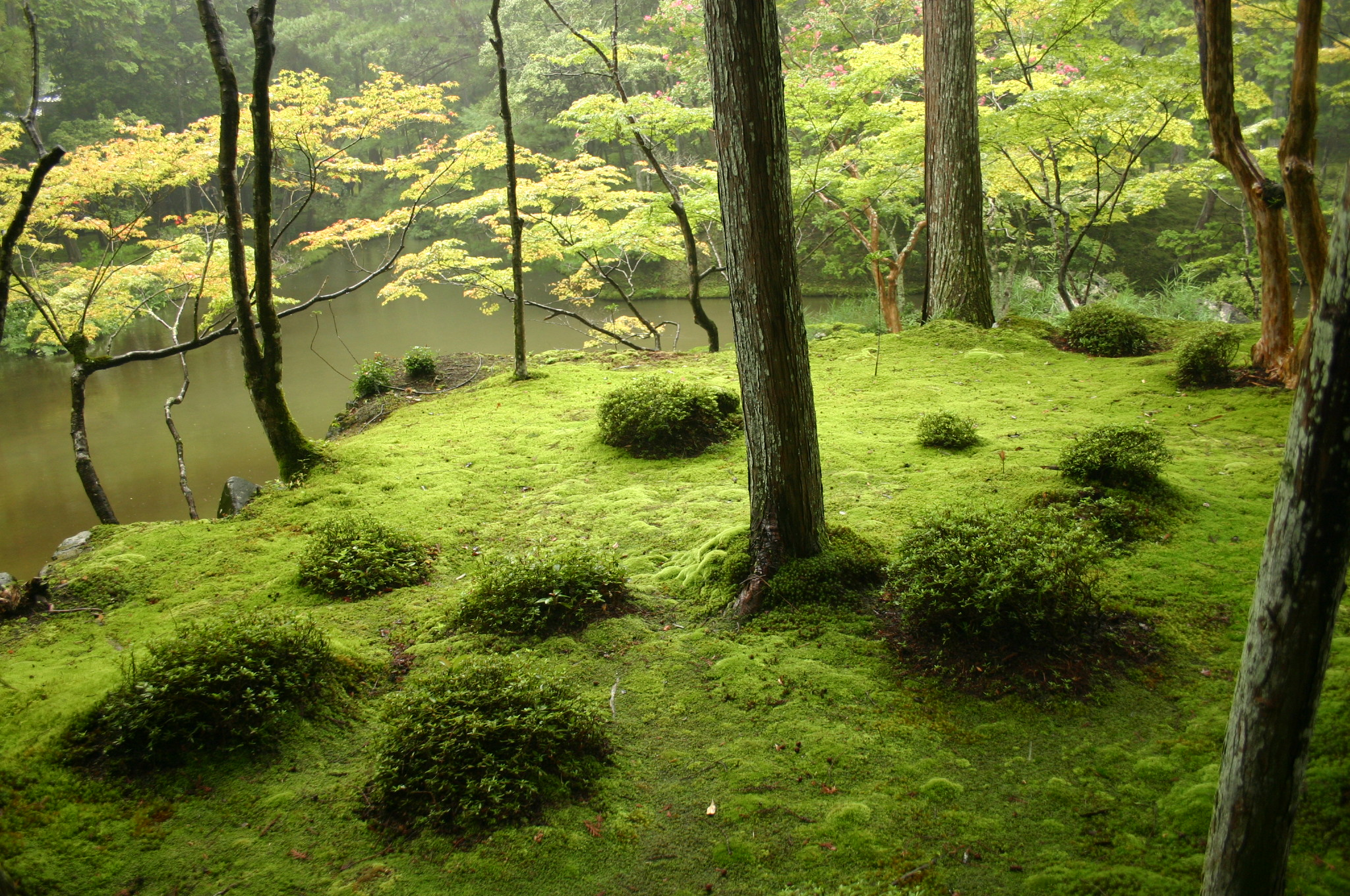
Saihō-ji The Moss Garden, an early Zen garden from the mid-14th century. The moss arrived much later, when the garden was not tended.

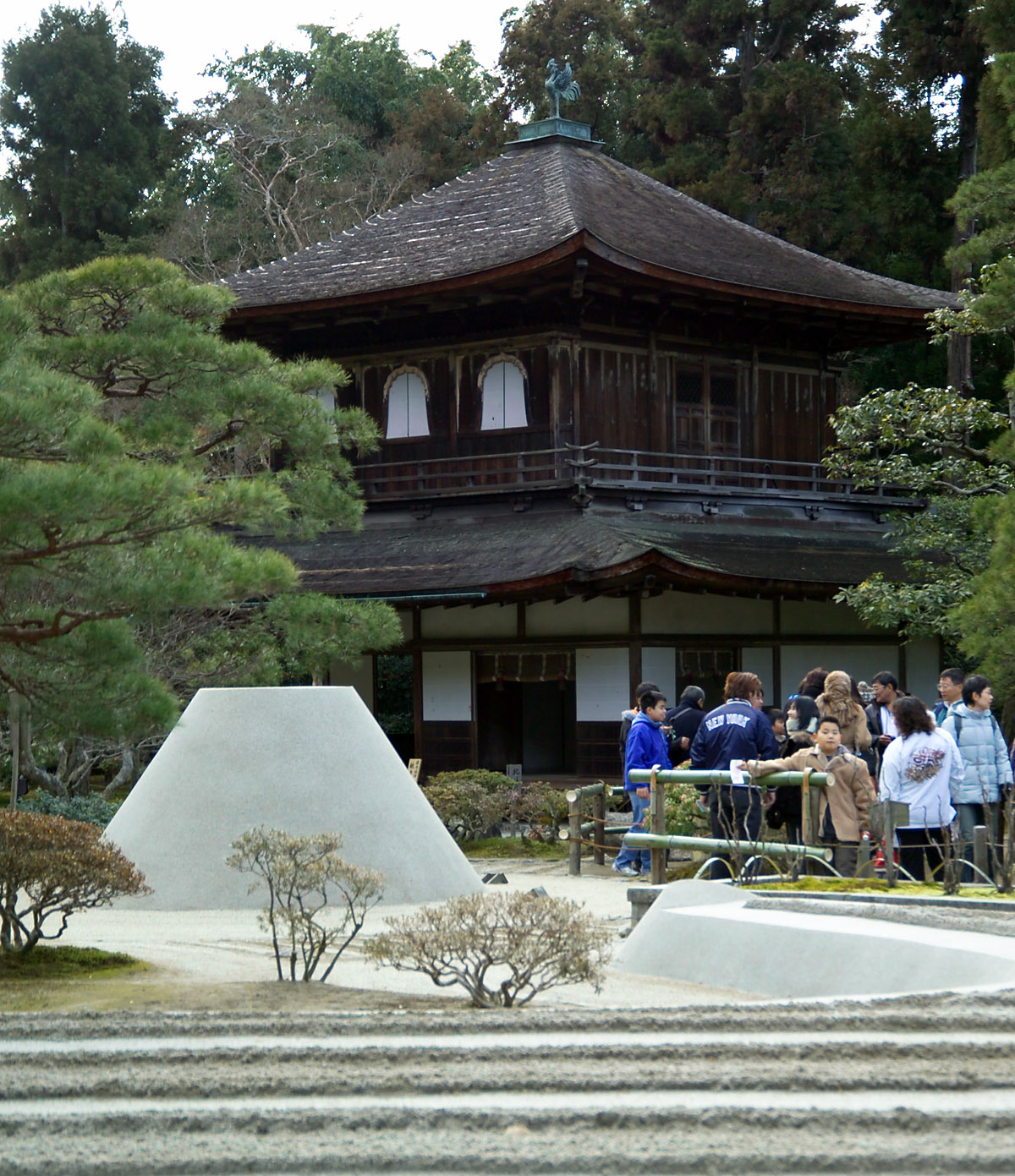
The garden of Ginkaku-ji features a replica of Mount Fuji made of gravel, in a gravel sea. it was the model for similar miniature mountains in Japanese gardens for centuries.

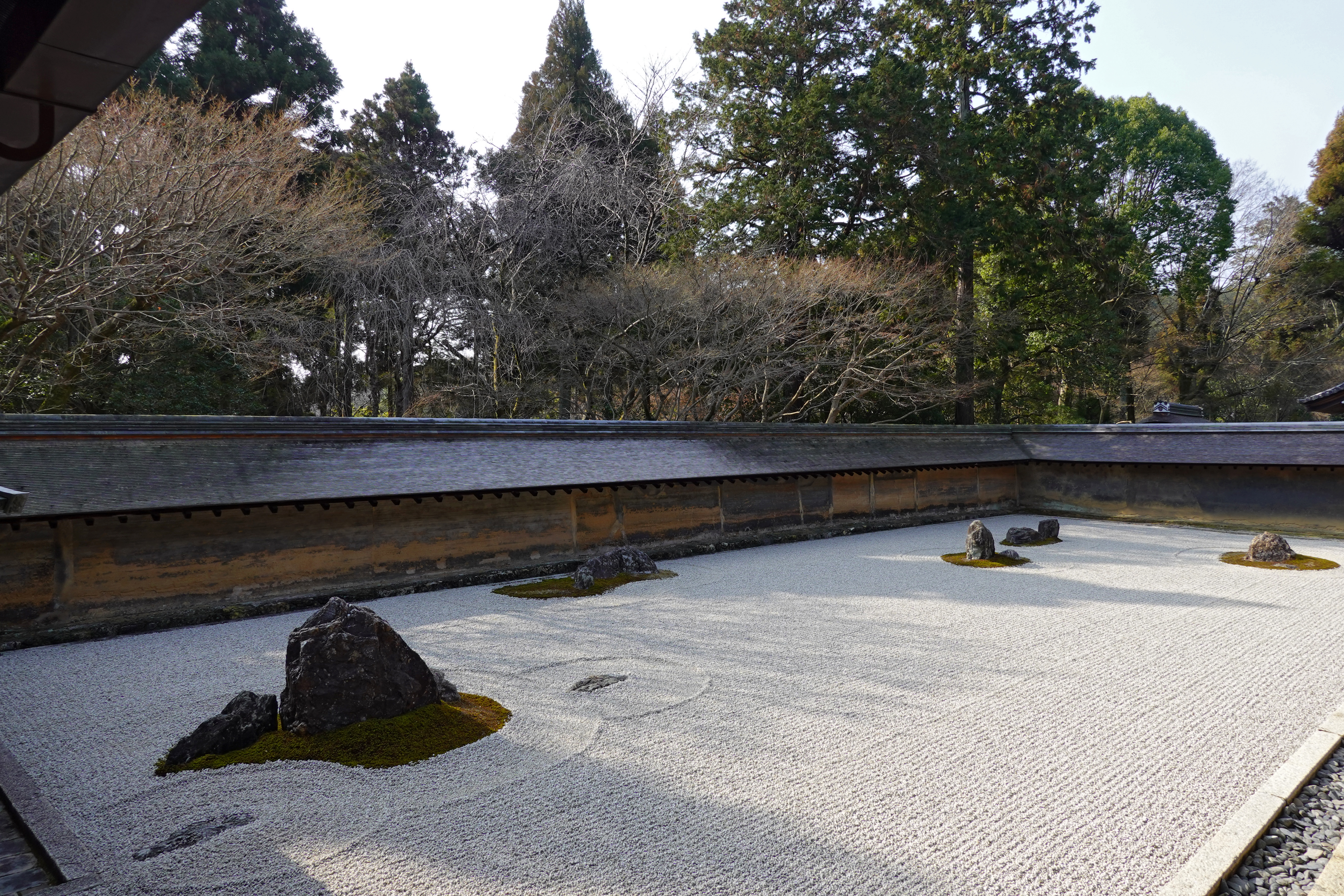
Part of the garden at Ryōan-ji (late 15th century), the most abstract of all Japanese Zen gardens

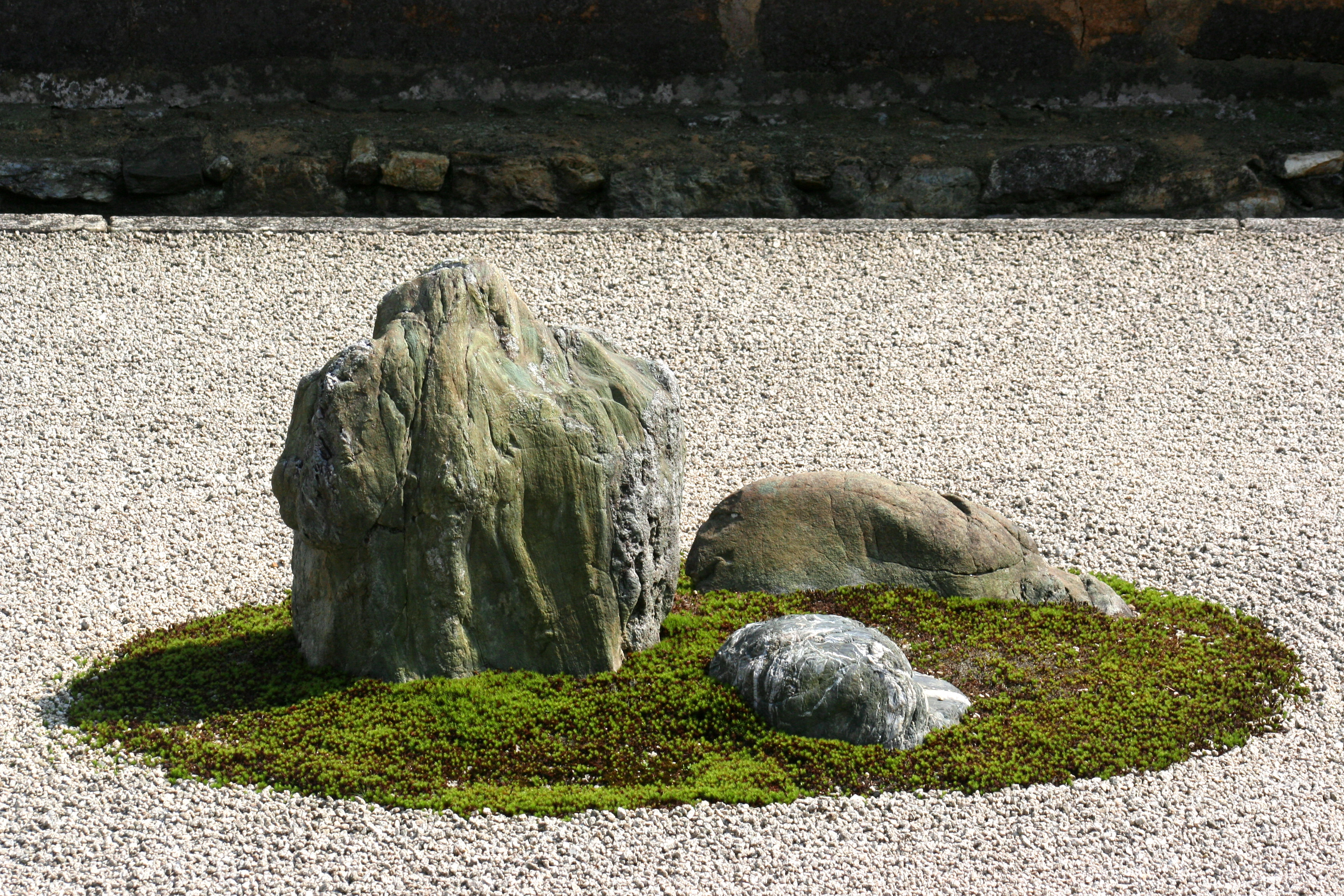
Classic triad rock composition at Ryōan-ji.

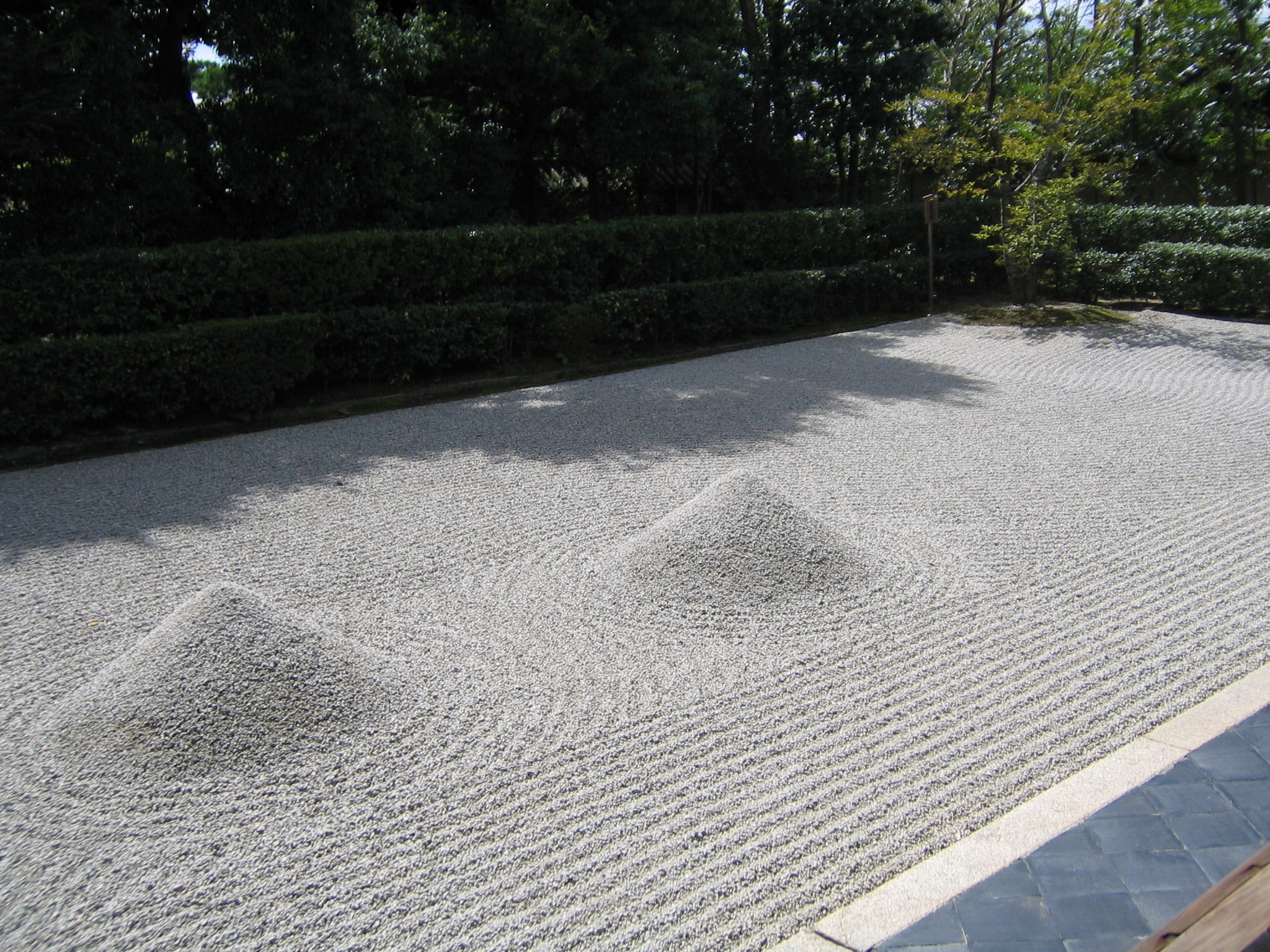
The white gravel "ocean" of the garden of Daisen-ji, to which the gravel river flows.

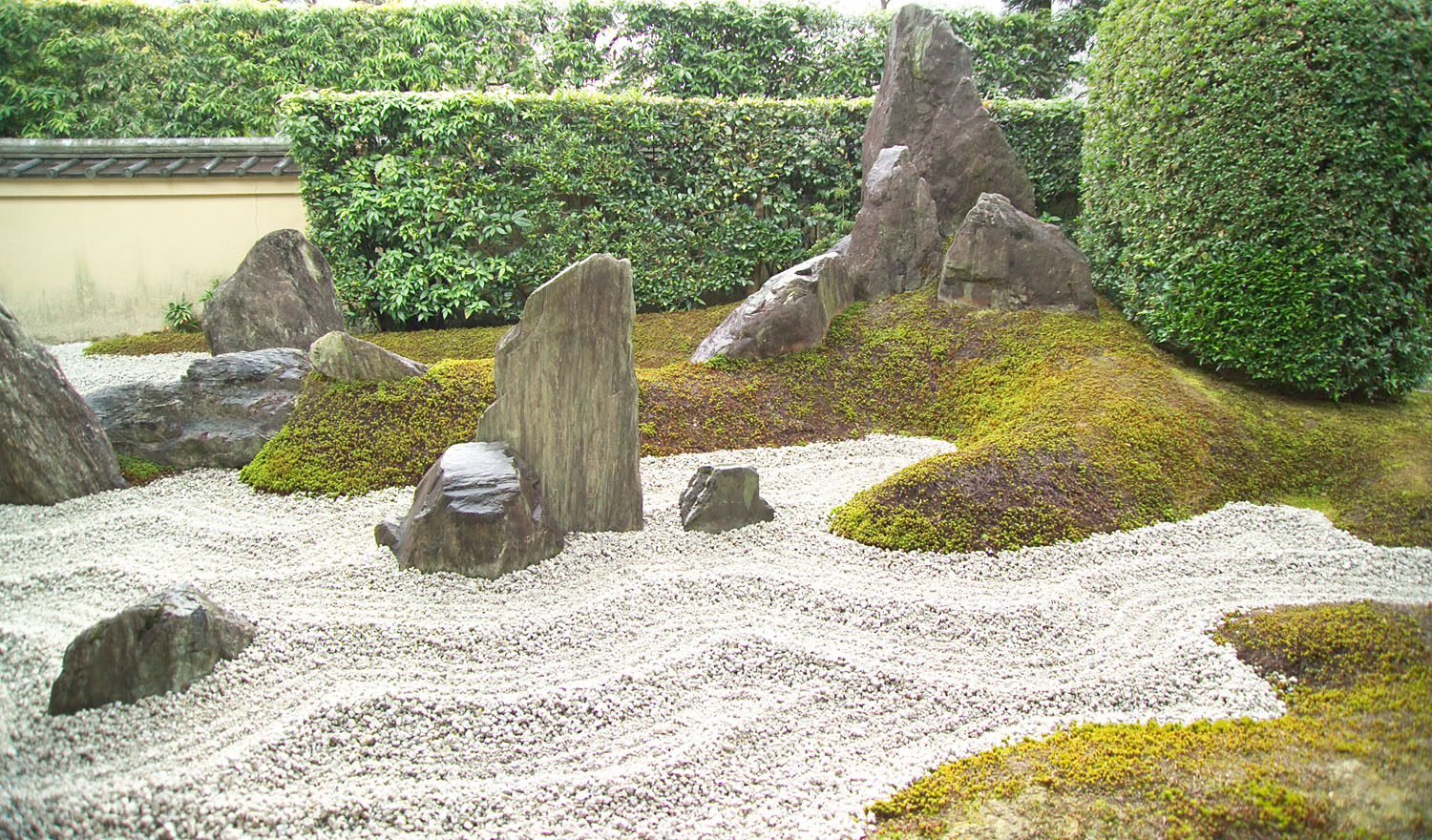
The Garden of the Blissful Mountain at Zuiho-in, a sub-temple of Daitoku-ji.

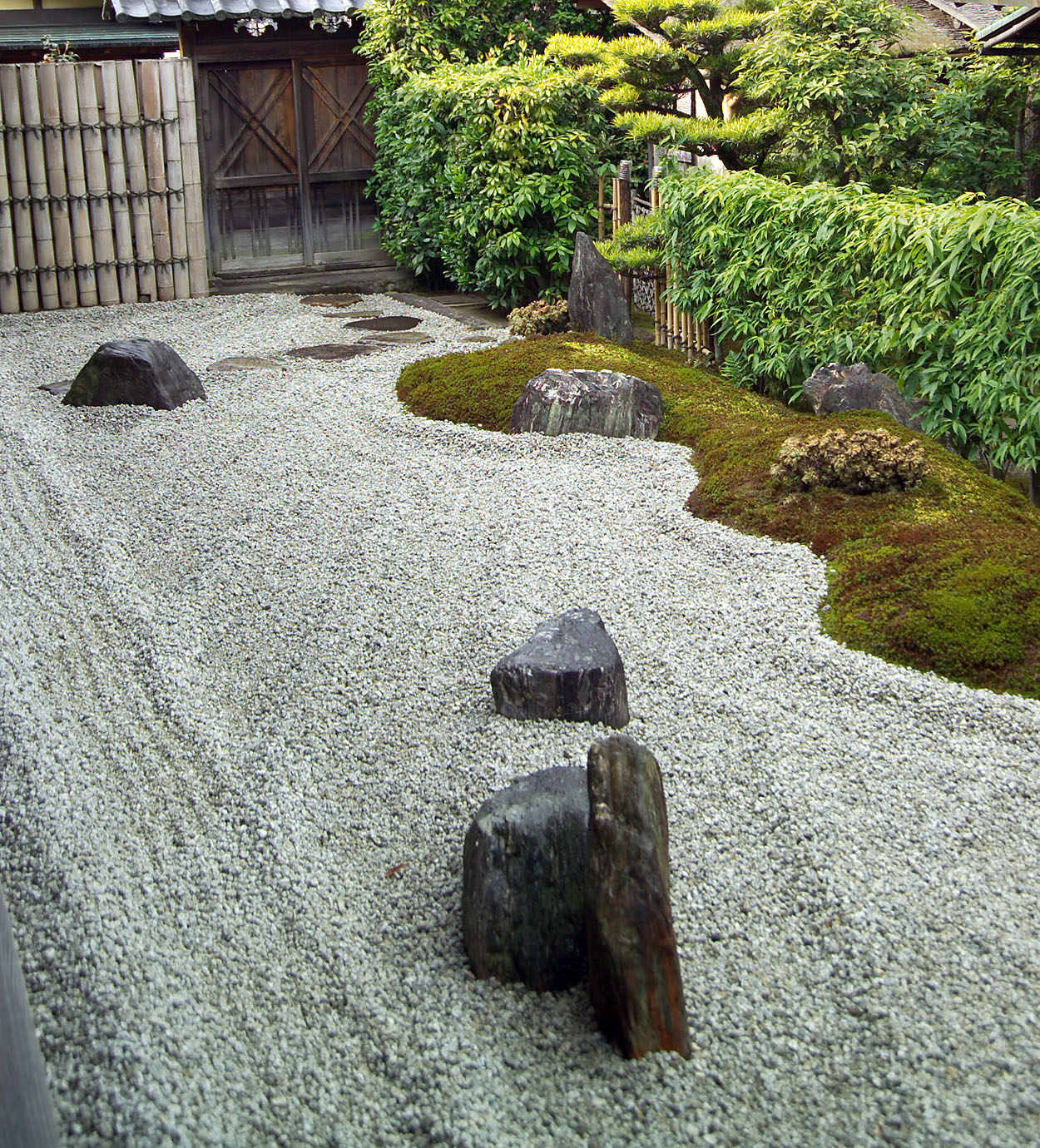
In Zuiho-in garden – some of the rocks are said to form a cross. The garden was built by the daimyō Ōtomo Sōrin, who was a convert to Christianity.

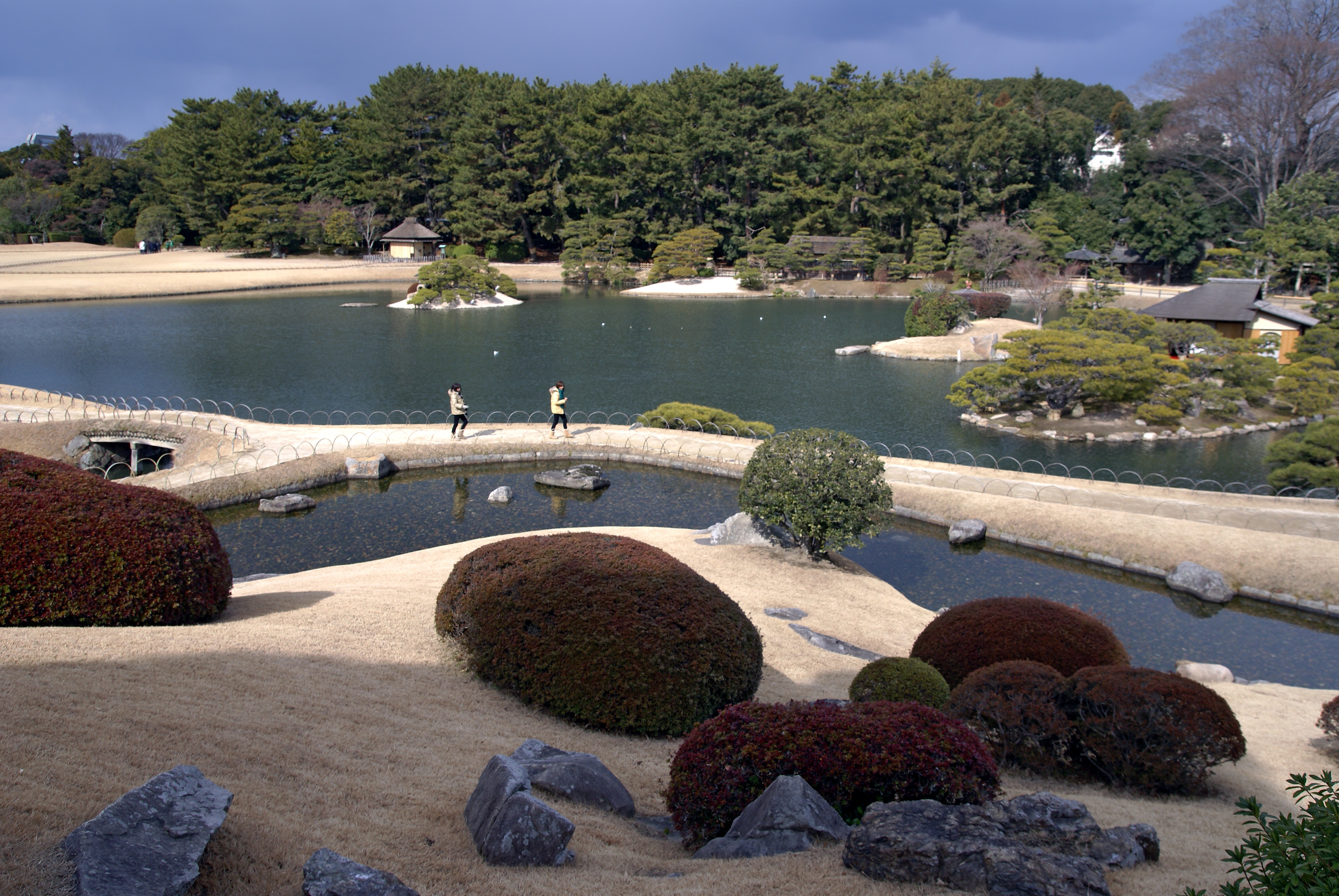

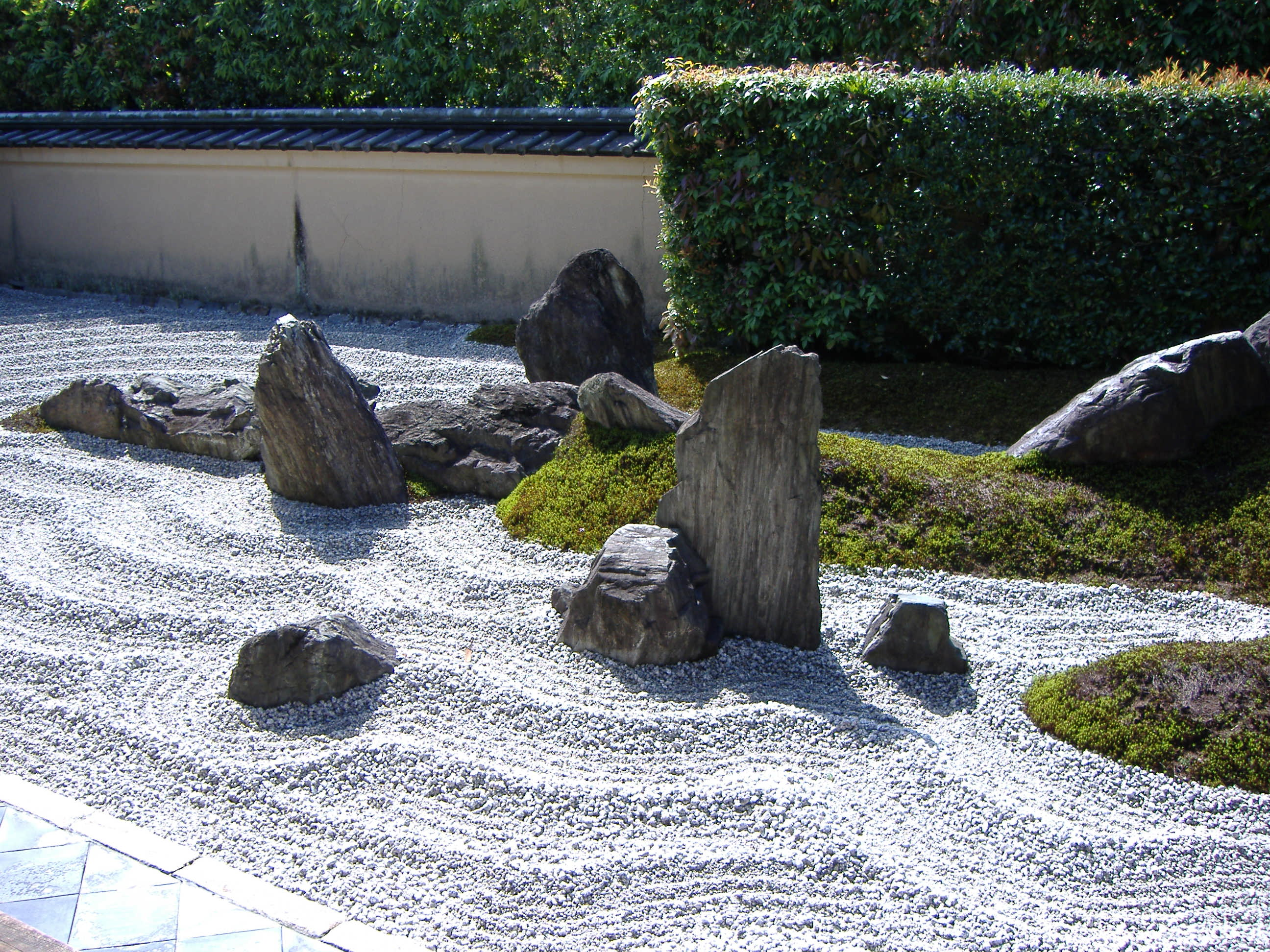

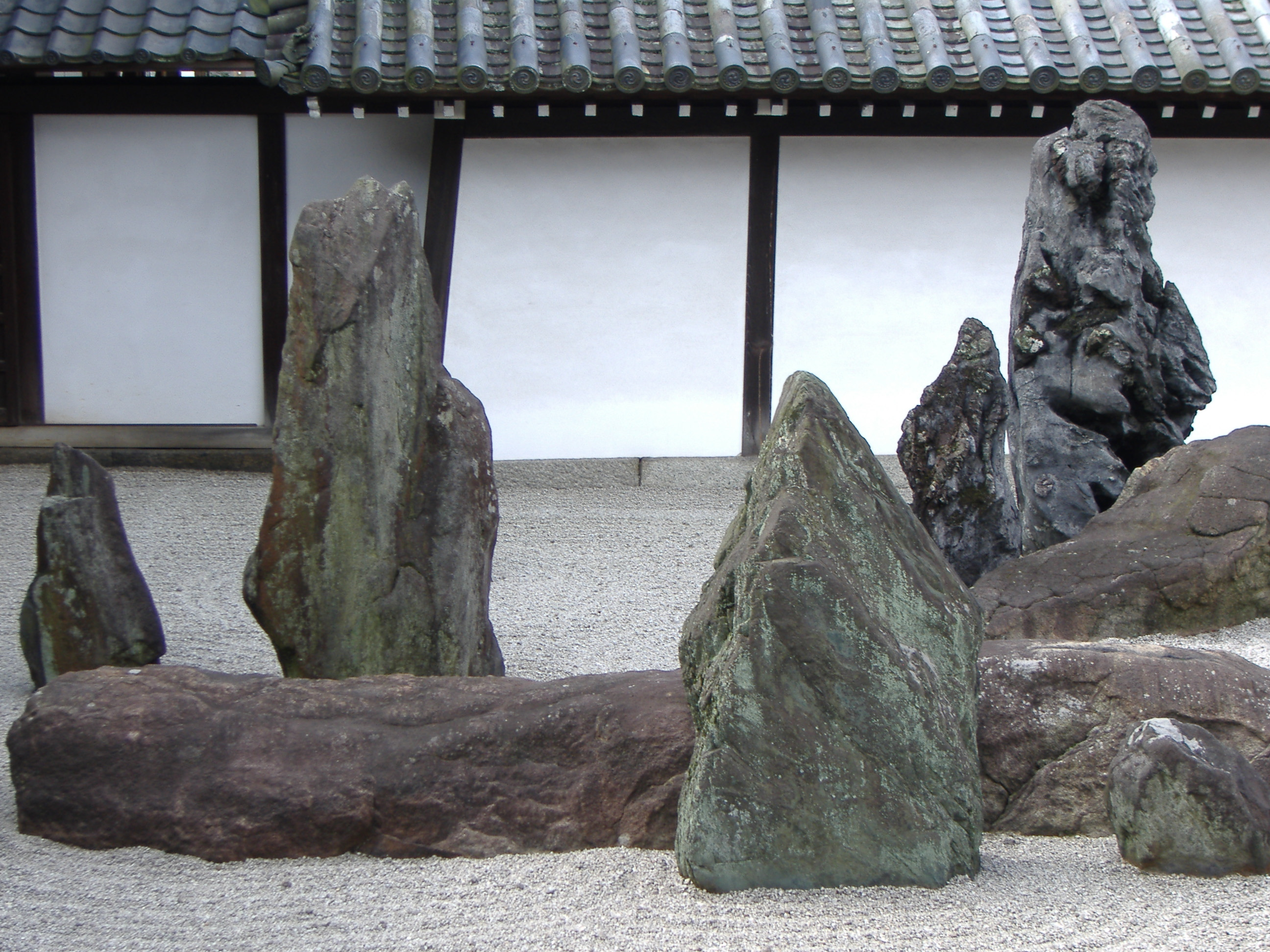

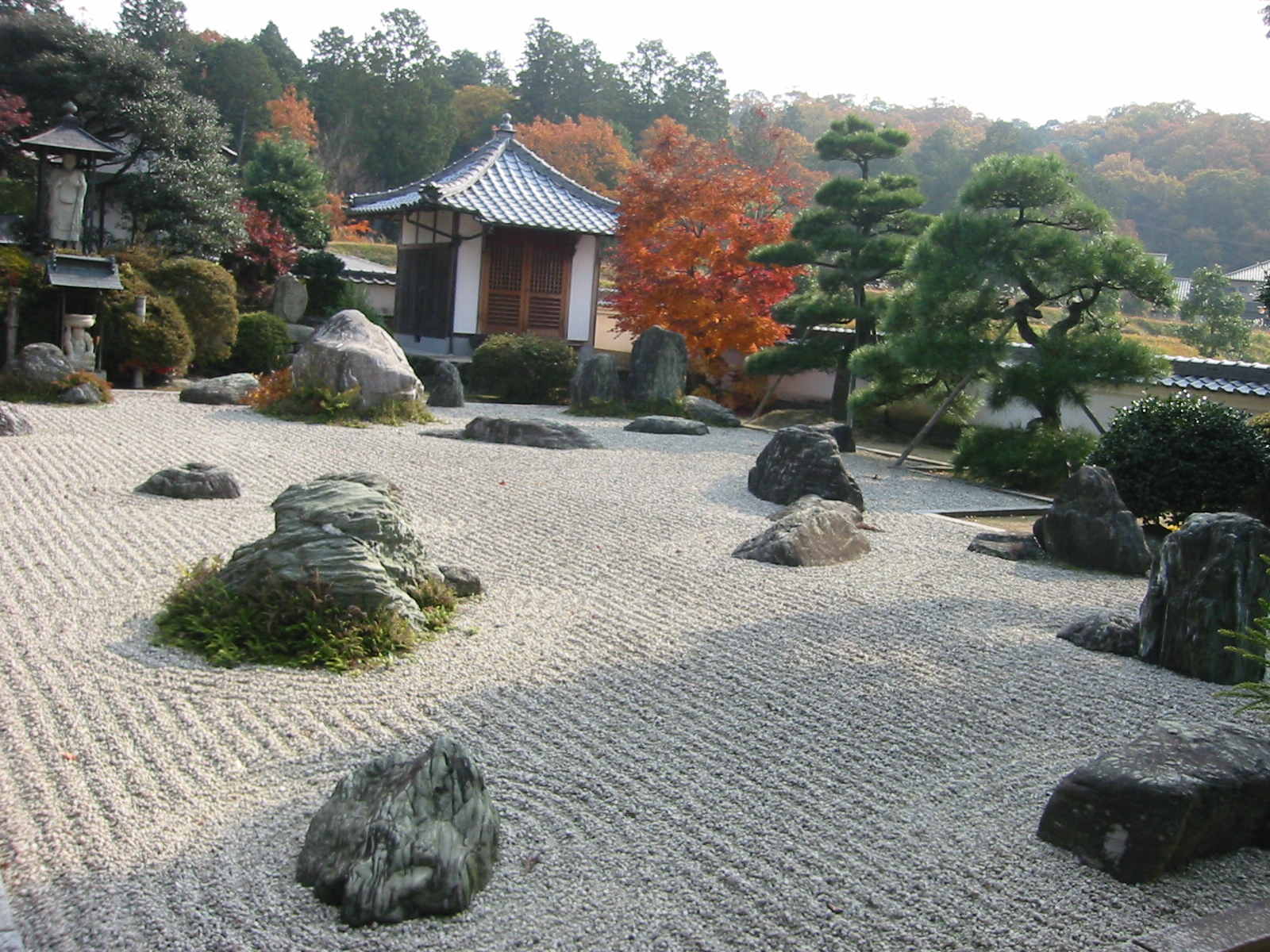

=== Later rock gardens ===
During the Edo period, the large promenade garden became the dominant style of Japanese garden, but Zen gardens continued to exist at Zen temples. A few small new rock gardens were built, usually as part of a garden where a real stream or pond was not practical.

In 1880, the buildings of Tōfuku-ji temple in Kyoto, one of the oldest temples in the city, were destroyed by a fire. In 1940, the temple commissioned the landscape historian and architect Shigemori Mirei to recreate the gardens. He created four different gardens, one for each face of the main temple building. He made one garden with five artificial hills covered with grass, symbolizing the five great ancient temples of Kyoto; a modern rock garden, with vertical rocks, symbolizing Mount Horai; a large "sea" of white gravel raked in a checkboard pattern; and an intimate garden with swirling sand patterns.

In the last century, Zen gardens have appeared in many countries outside Japan.

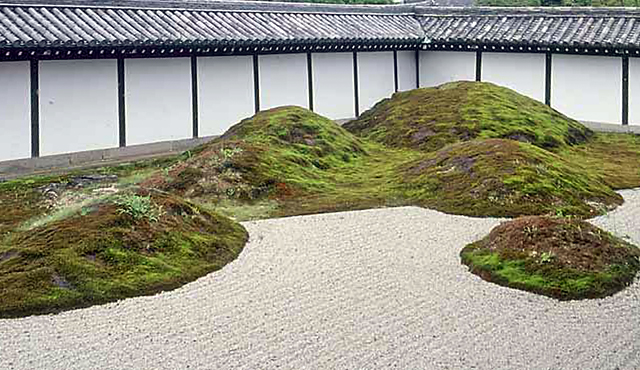
The garden of Tōfuku-ji (1940). The five hills symbolize the five great Zen temples of Kyoto.

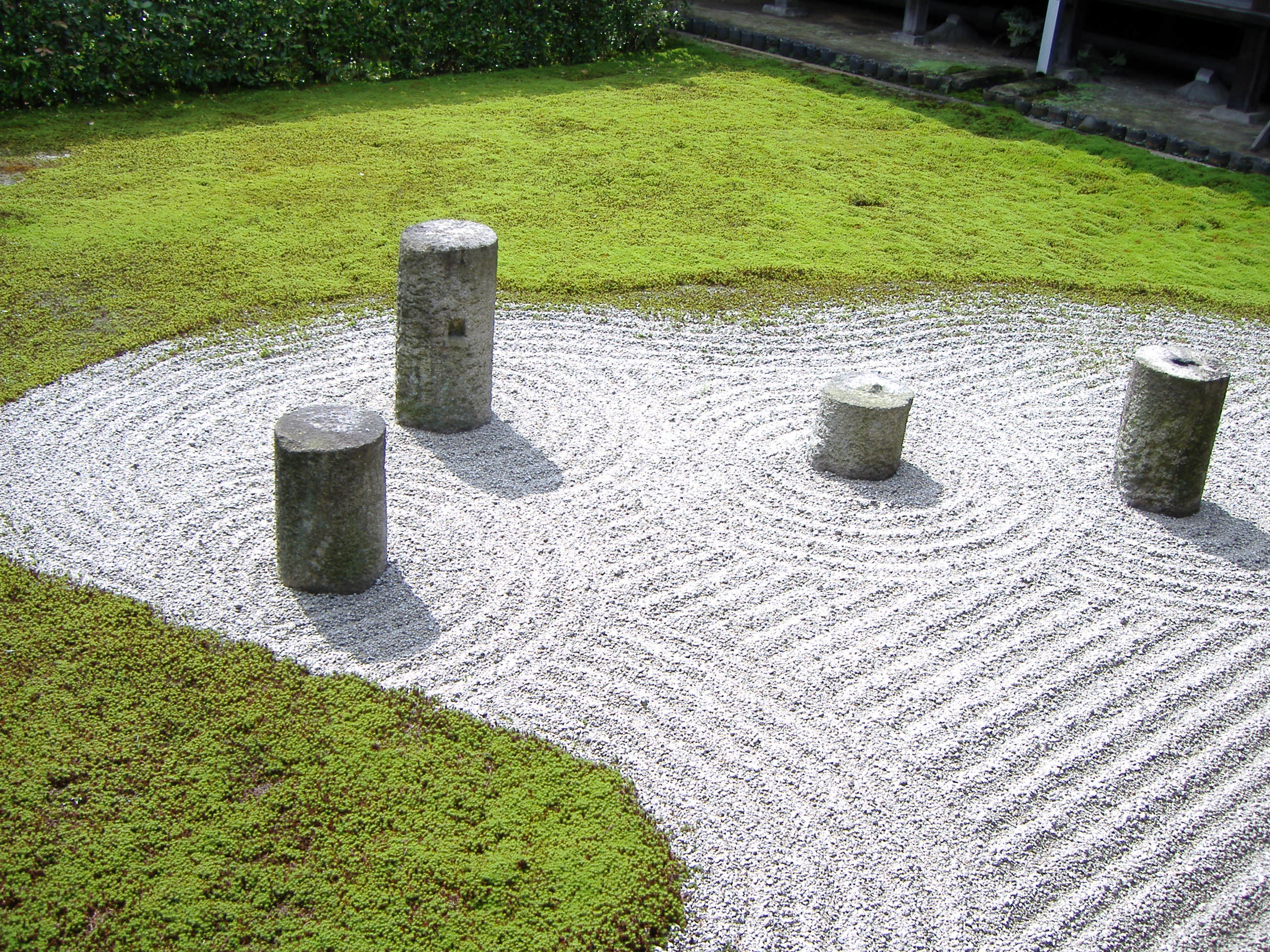
The modern Zen garden at Tōfuku-ji (1940).

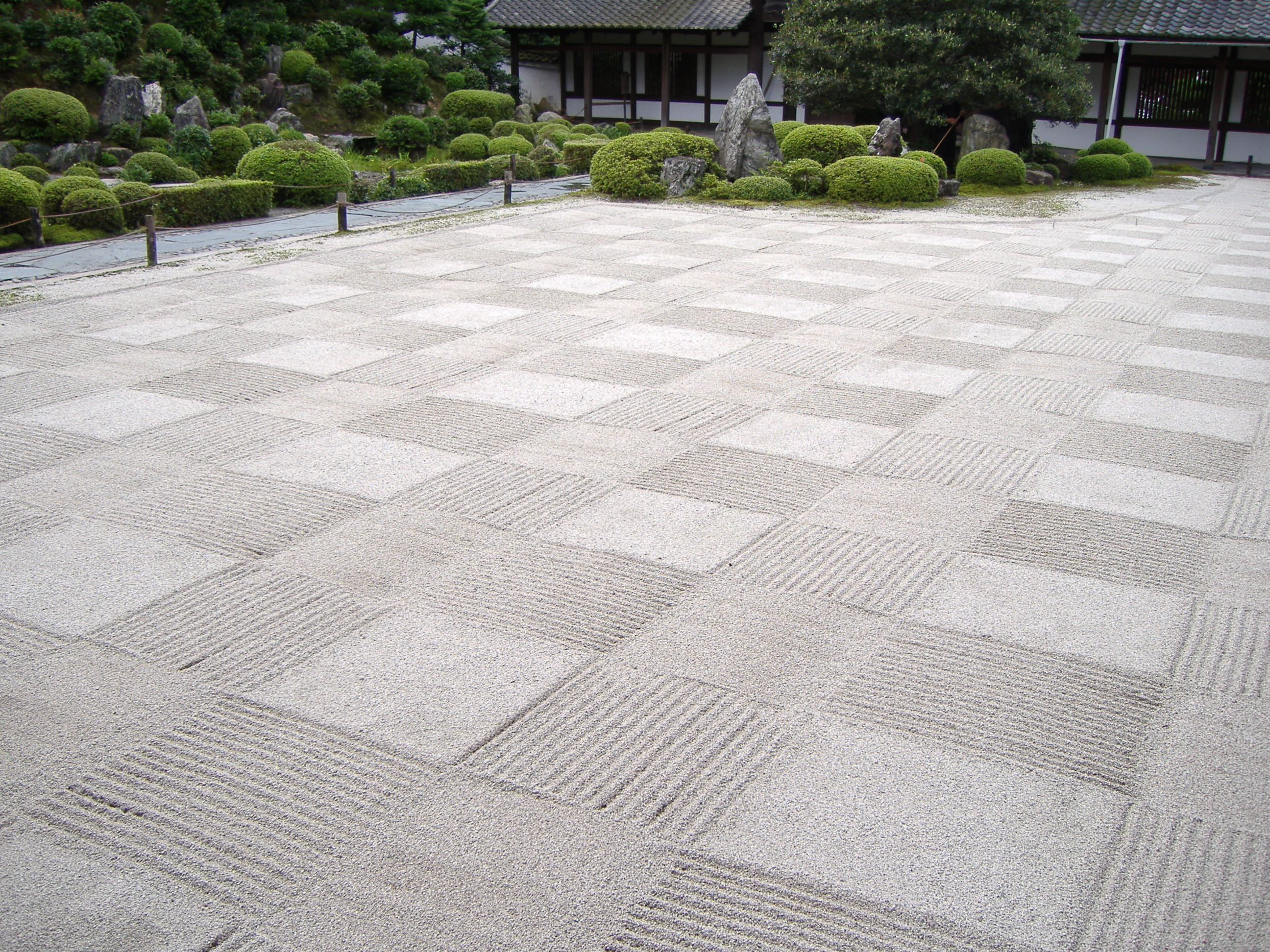
A Zen garden in a checkboard pattern, at Tōfuku-ji (1940).

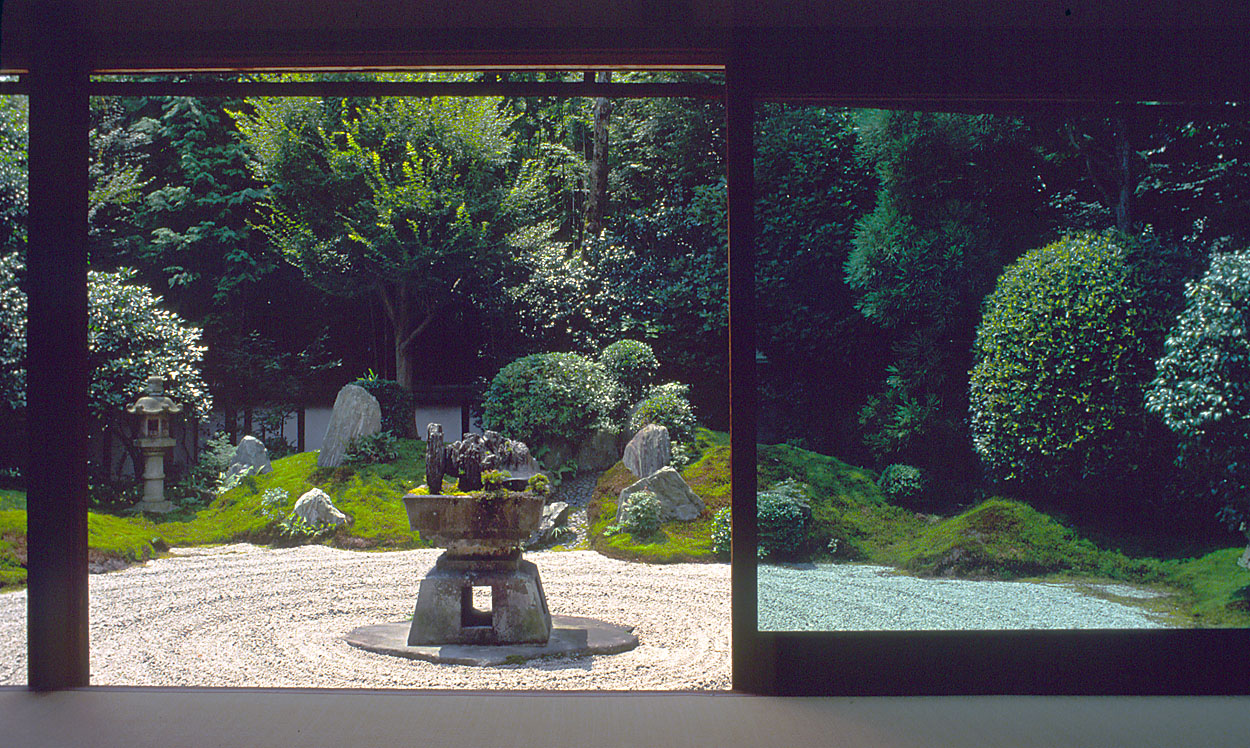
A courtyard Zen garden at Tōfuku-ji (1940).

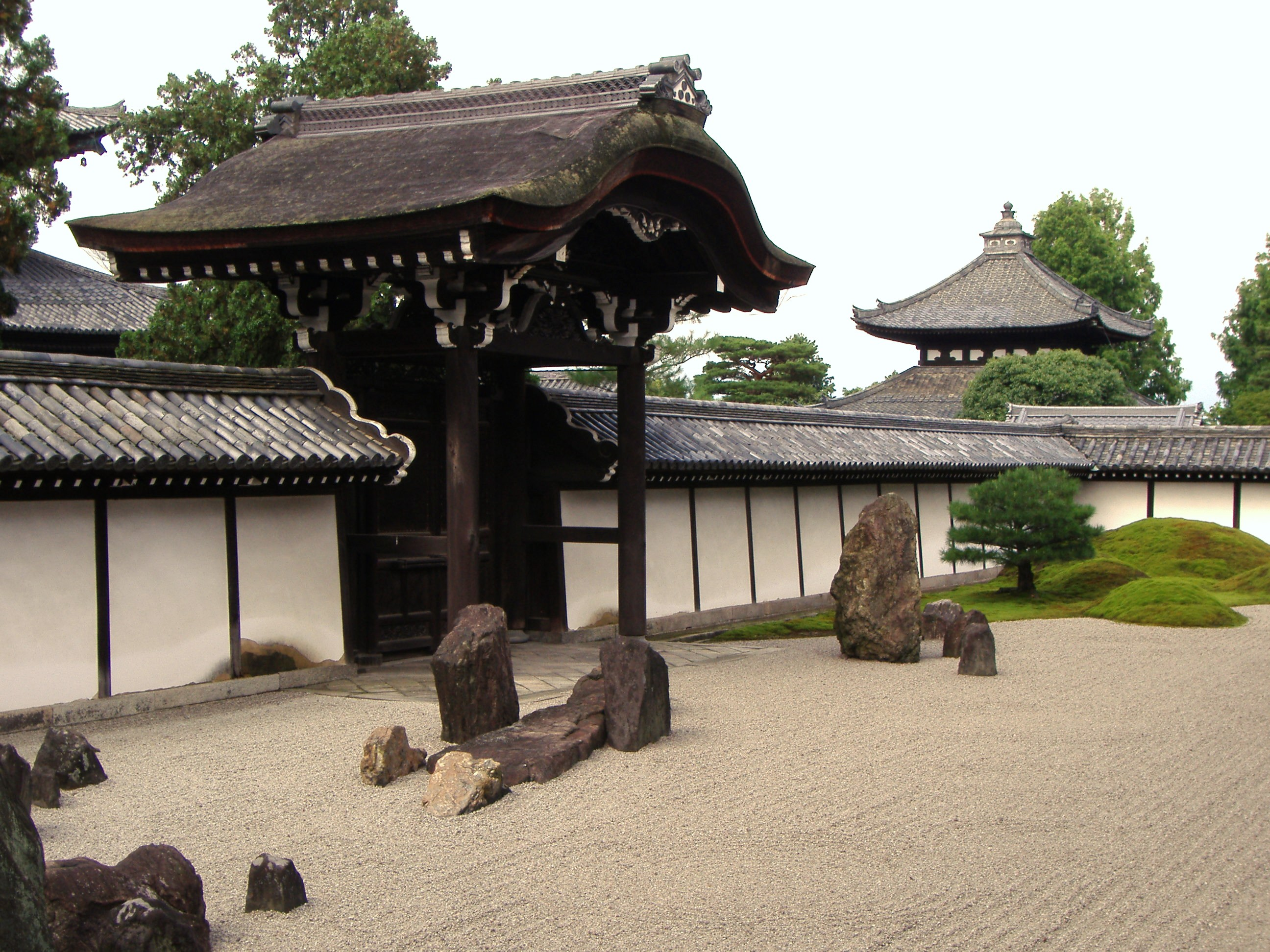
Part of the modern Zen garden at Tōfuku-ji (1940). The "islands" of the immortals.

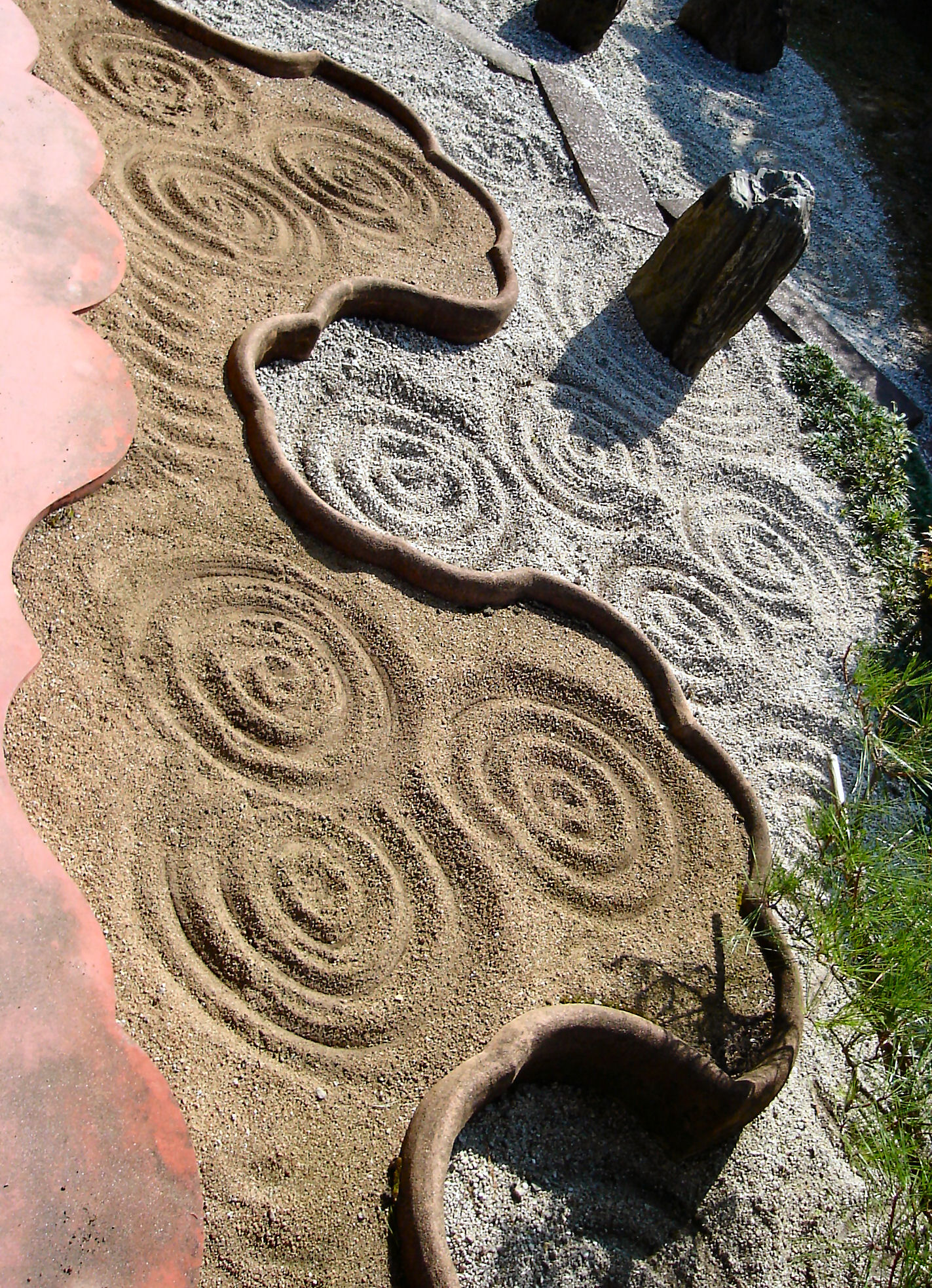
Part of the modern Zen garden at Tōfuku-ji (1940).

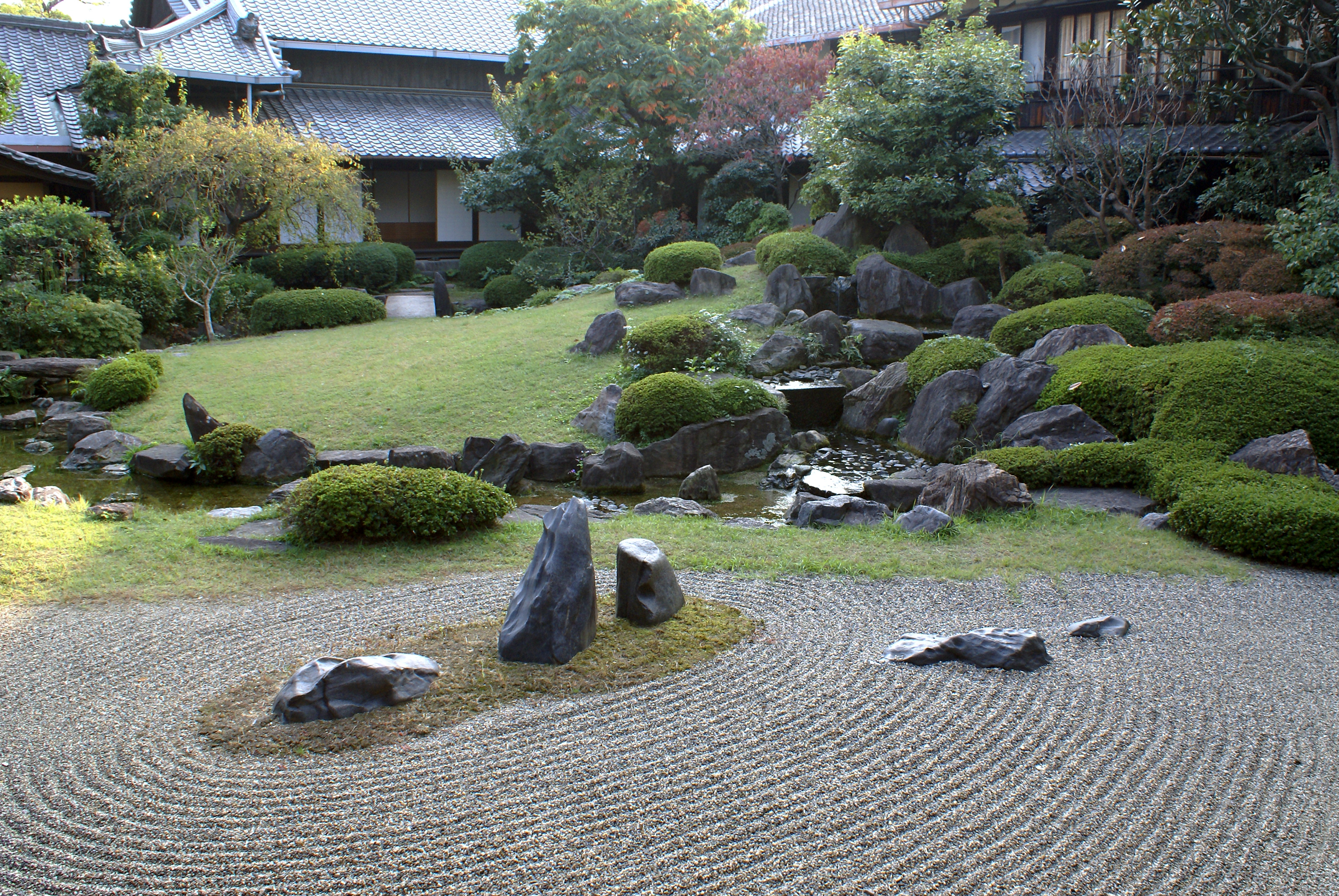
Shitennō-ji Honbō garden

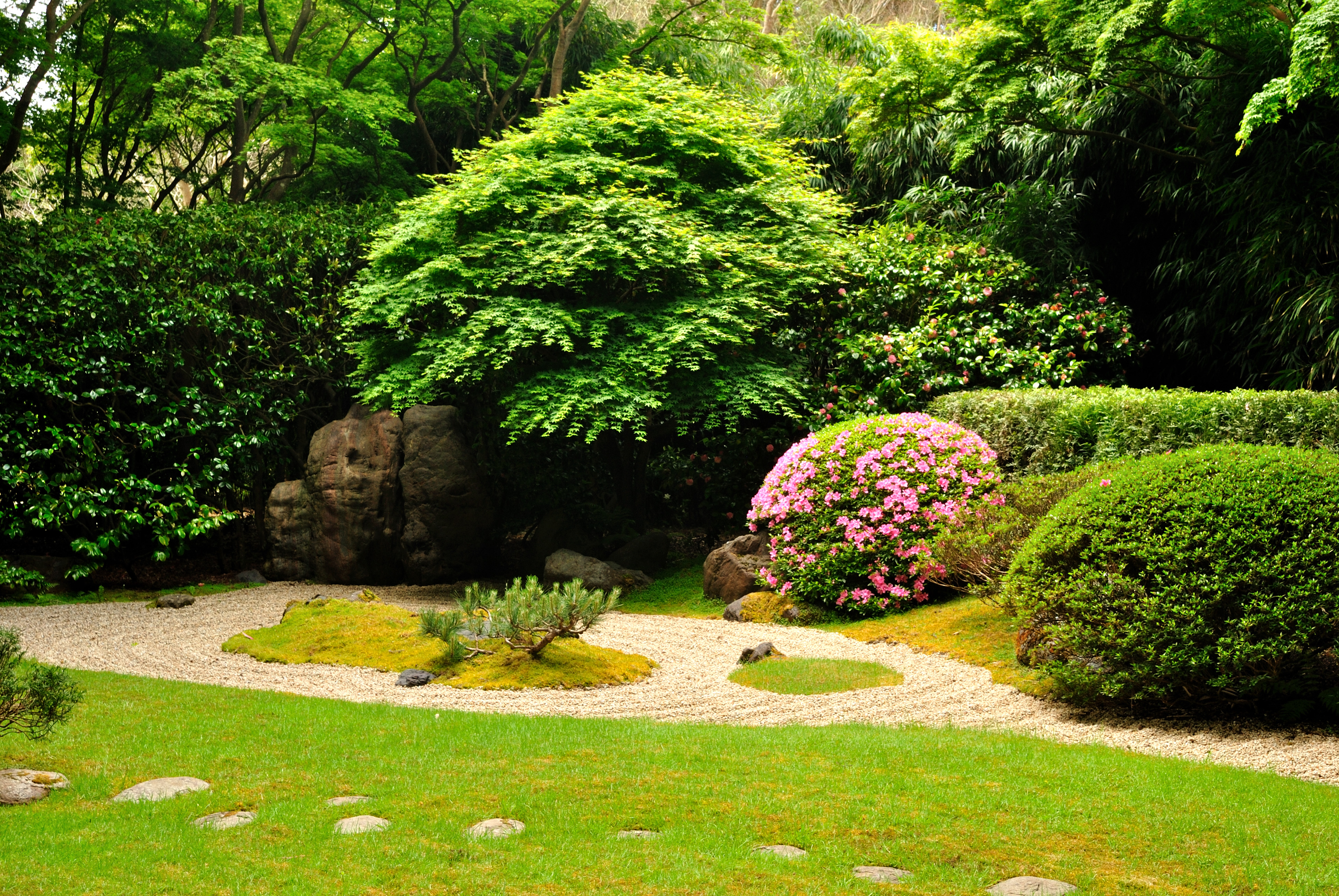
A small garden in the Japanese Tea Garden of Golden Gate Park, in San Francisco

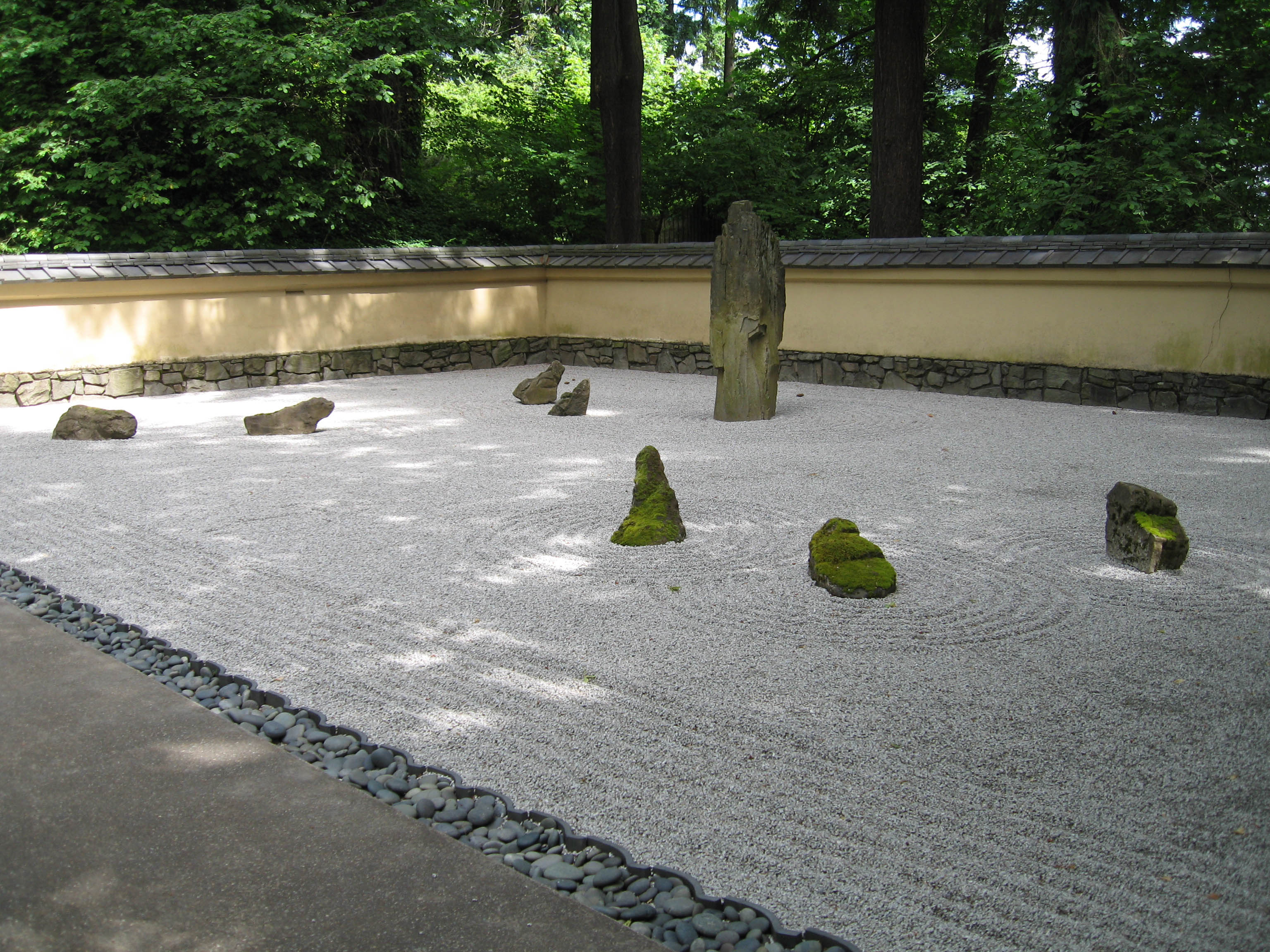
Sand and stone garden located in the Portland Japanese Gardens.

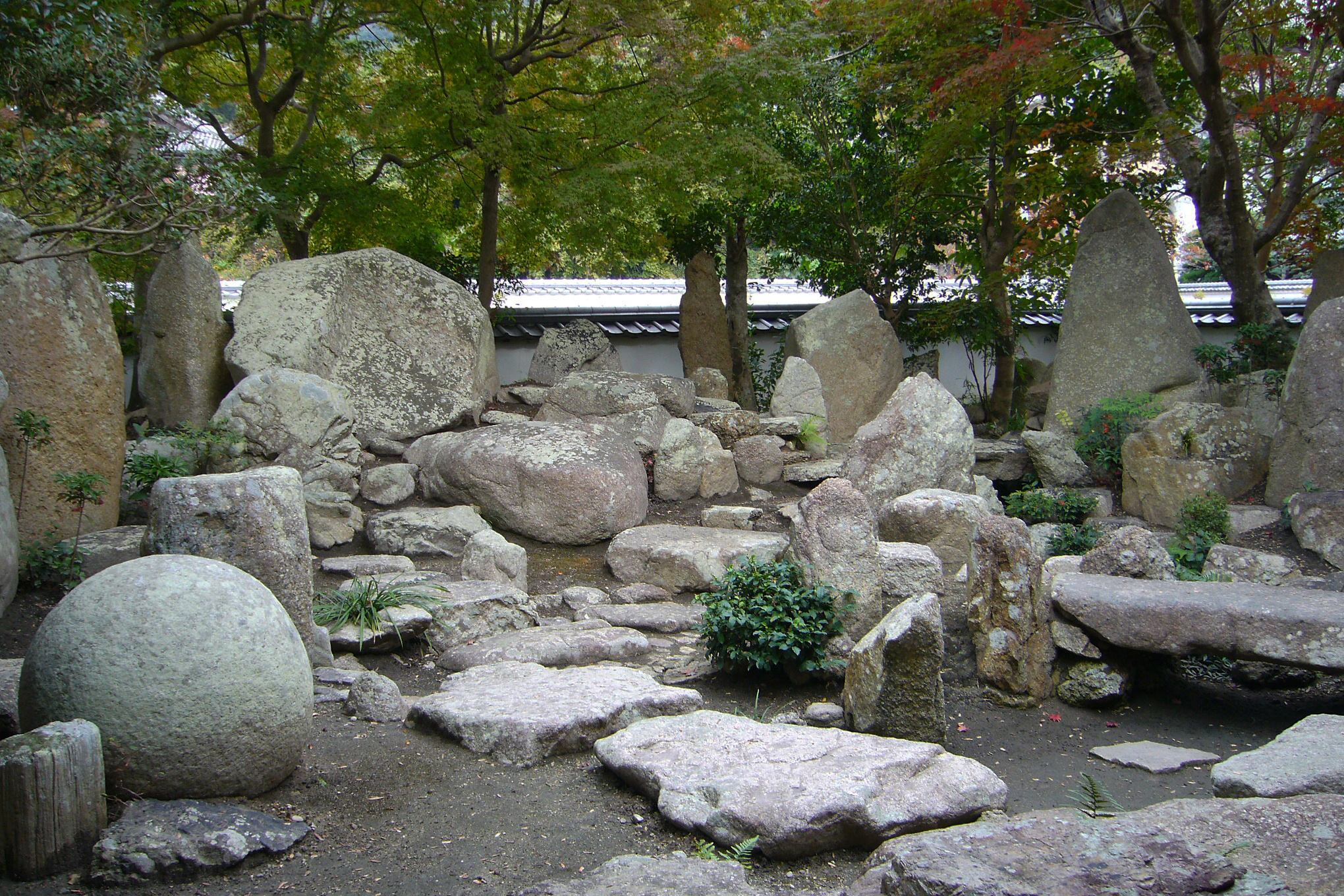
An'yō-in Garden of Taisan-ji in Kobe, Hyogo, Japan.

Rosan-ji garden

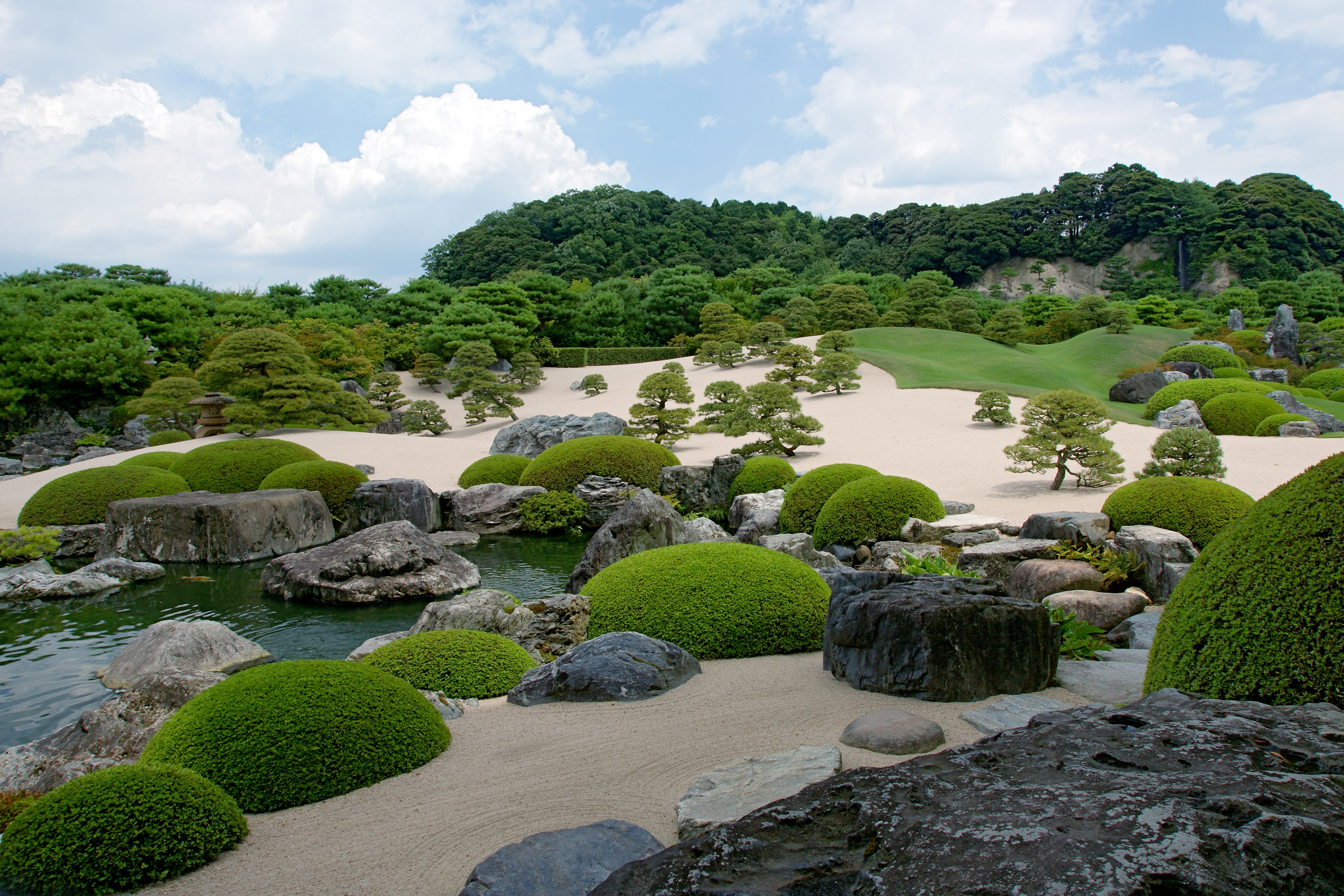
Adachi Museum of Art

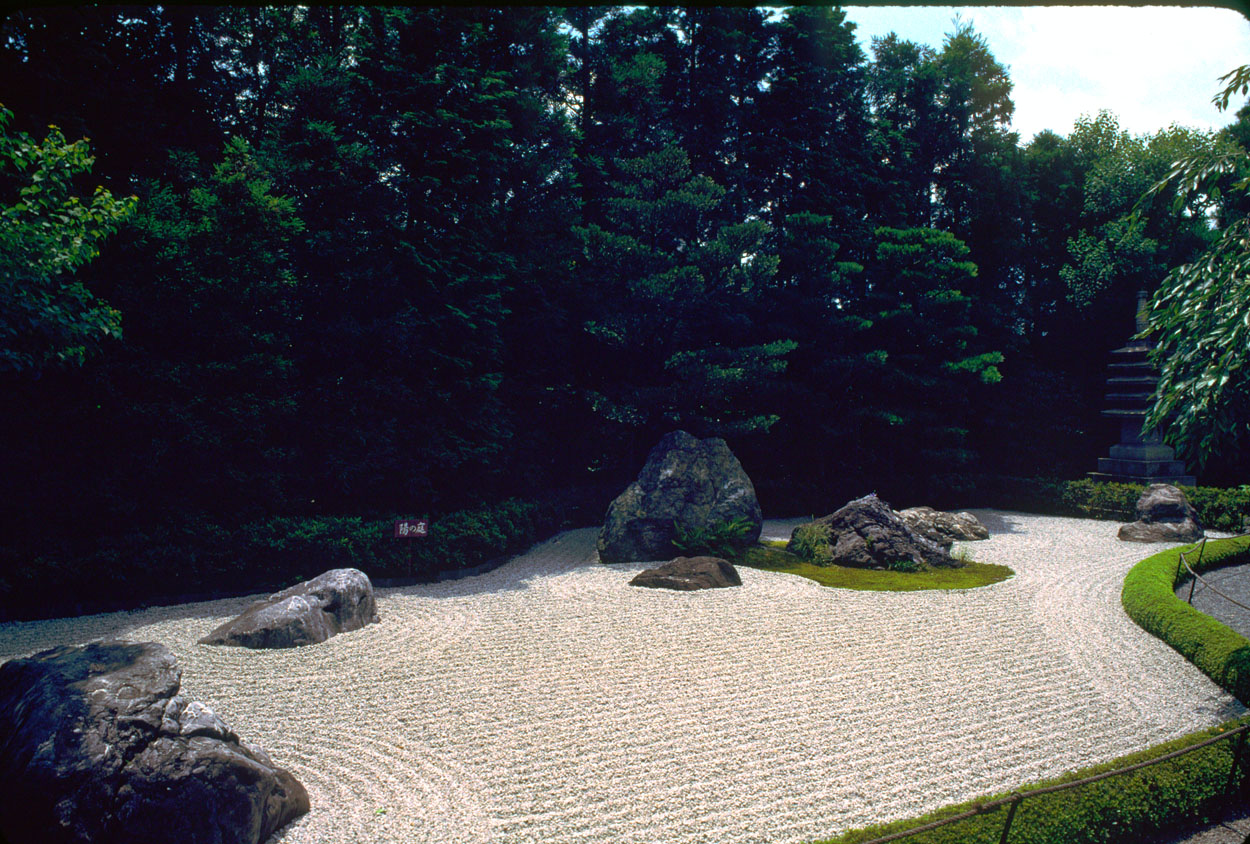
Taizō-in, Myōshin-ji, in Kyoto

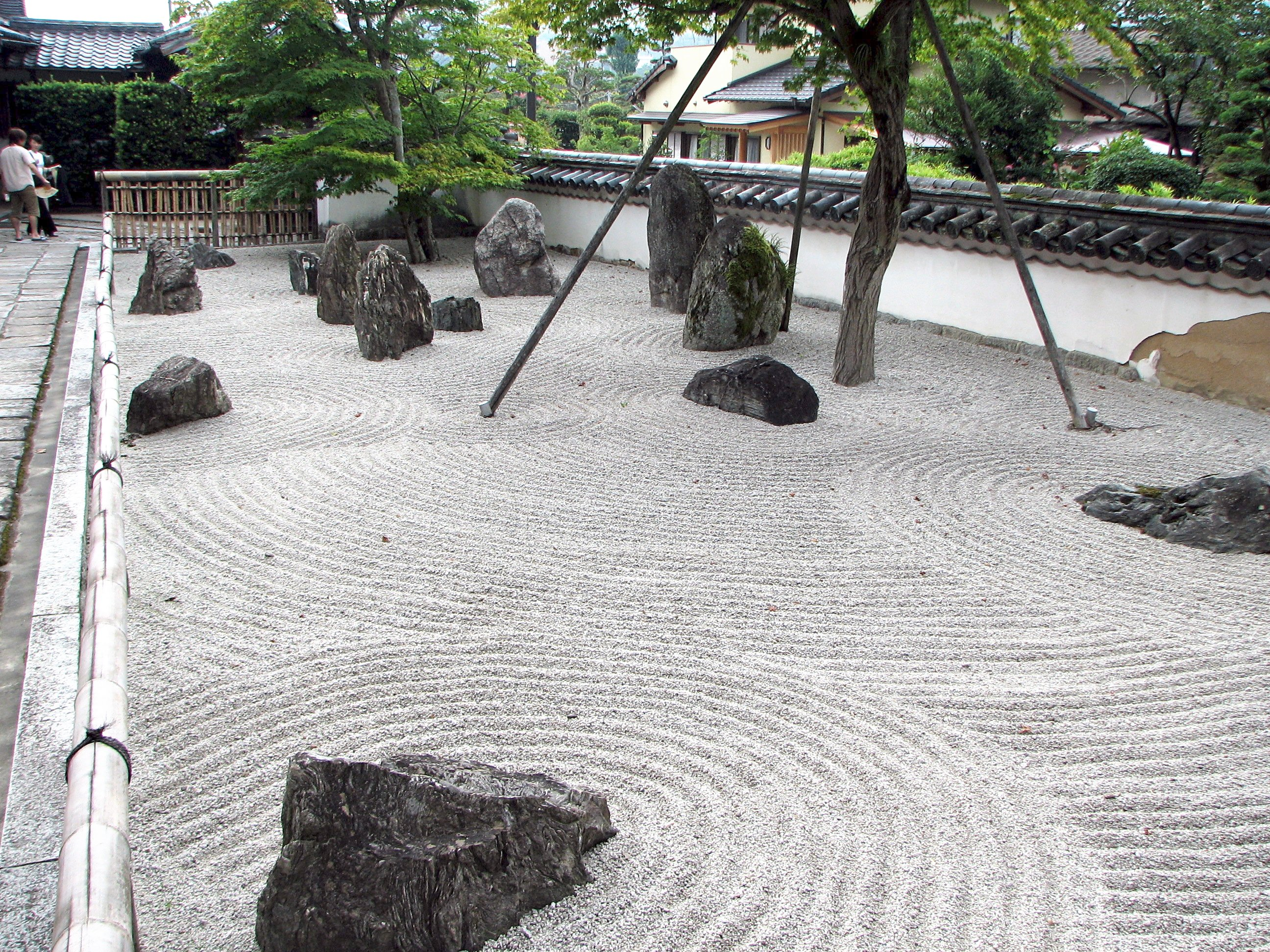
KōmyōZen-ji

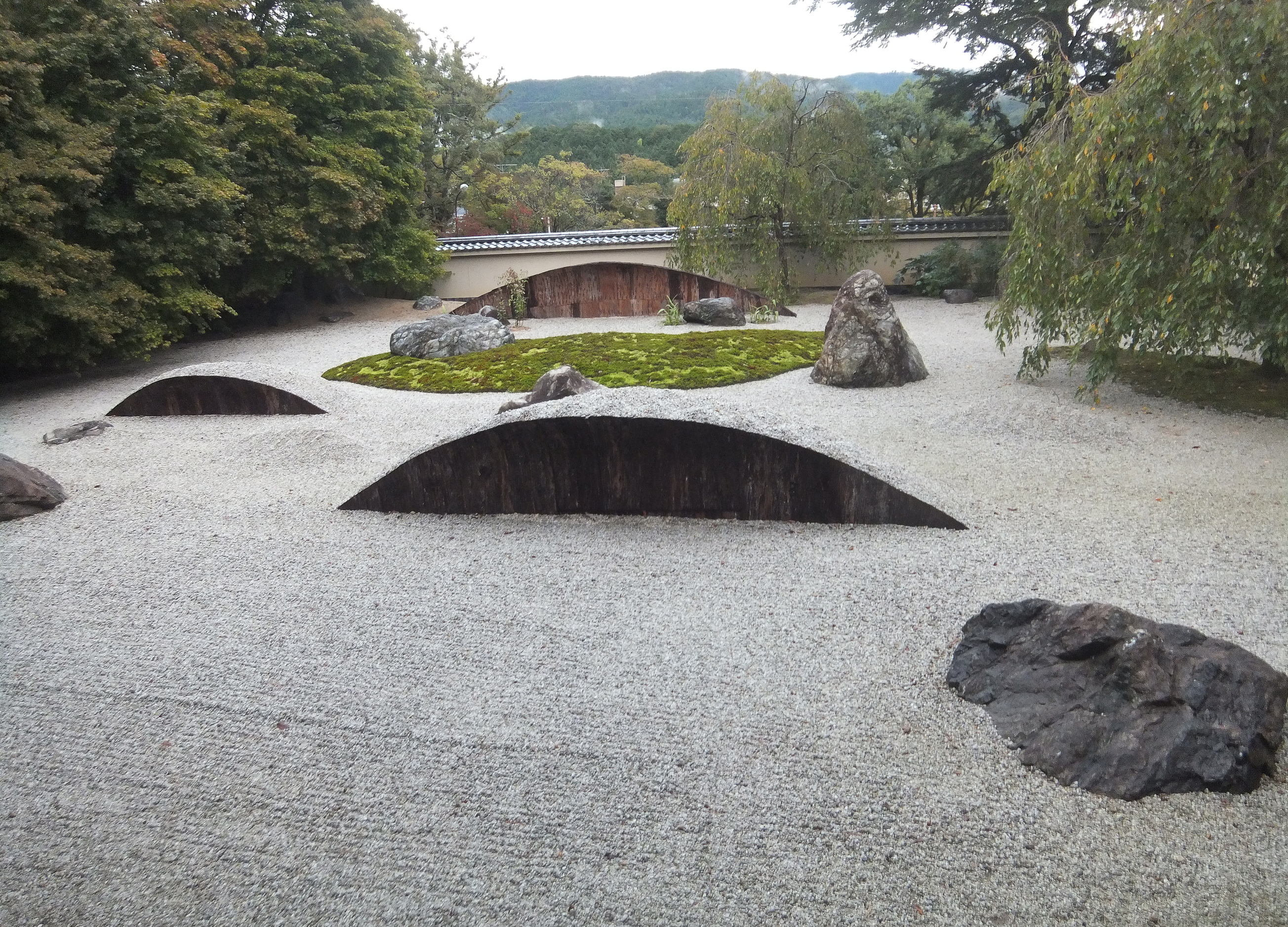
Jissō-in, in Kyoto (Iwakura)

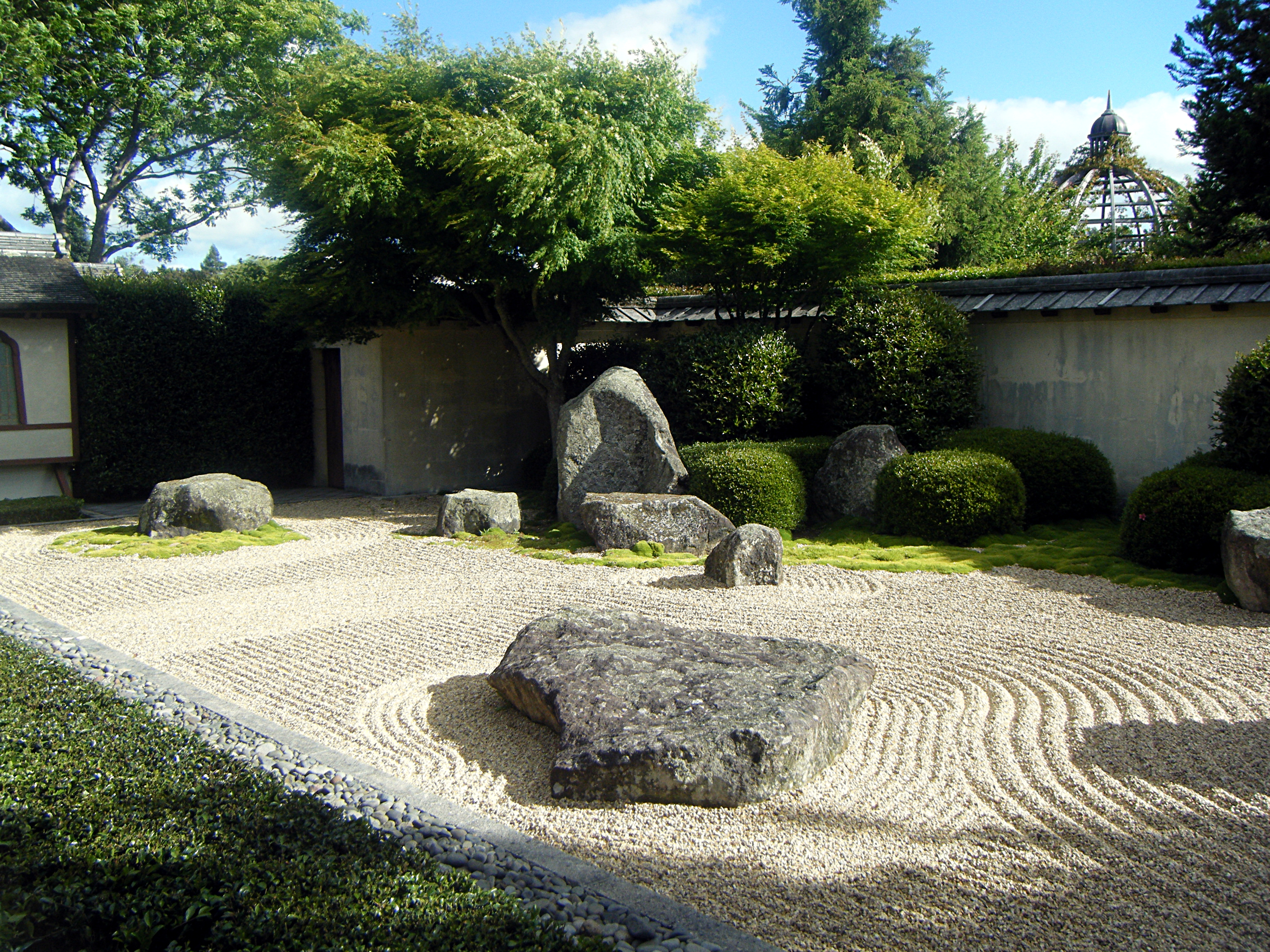
Japanese Garden at Hamilton Gardens, Waikato, New Zealand

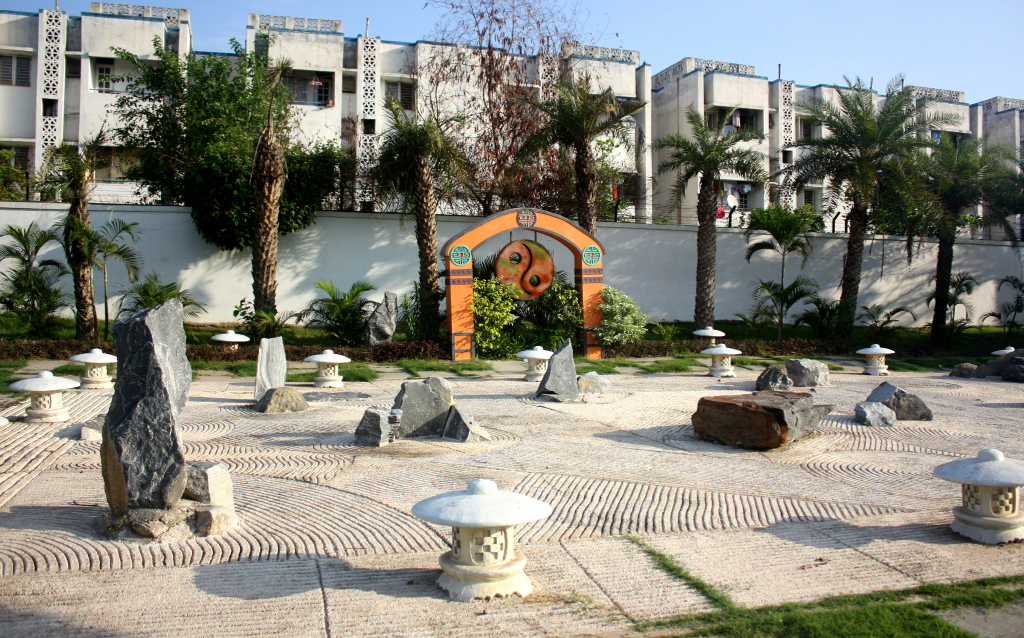
Japanese Rock Garden (Phase 1), Chandigarh (India)

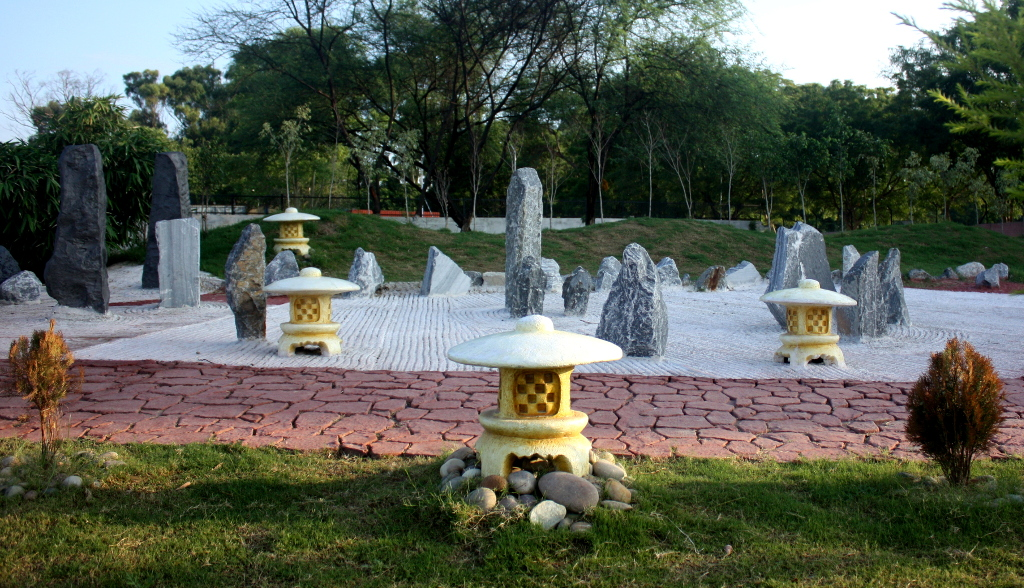
Japanese Rock Garden (Phase 2), Chandigarh (India)

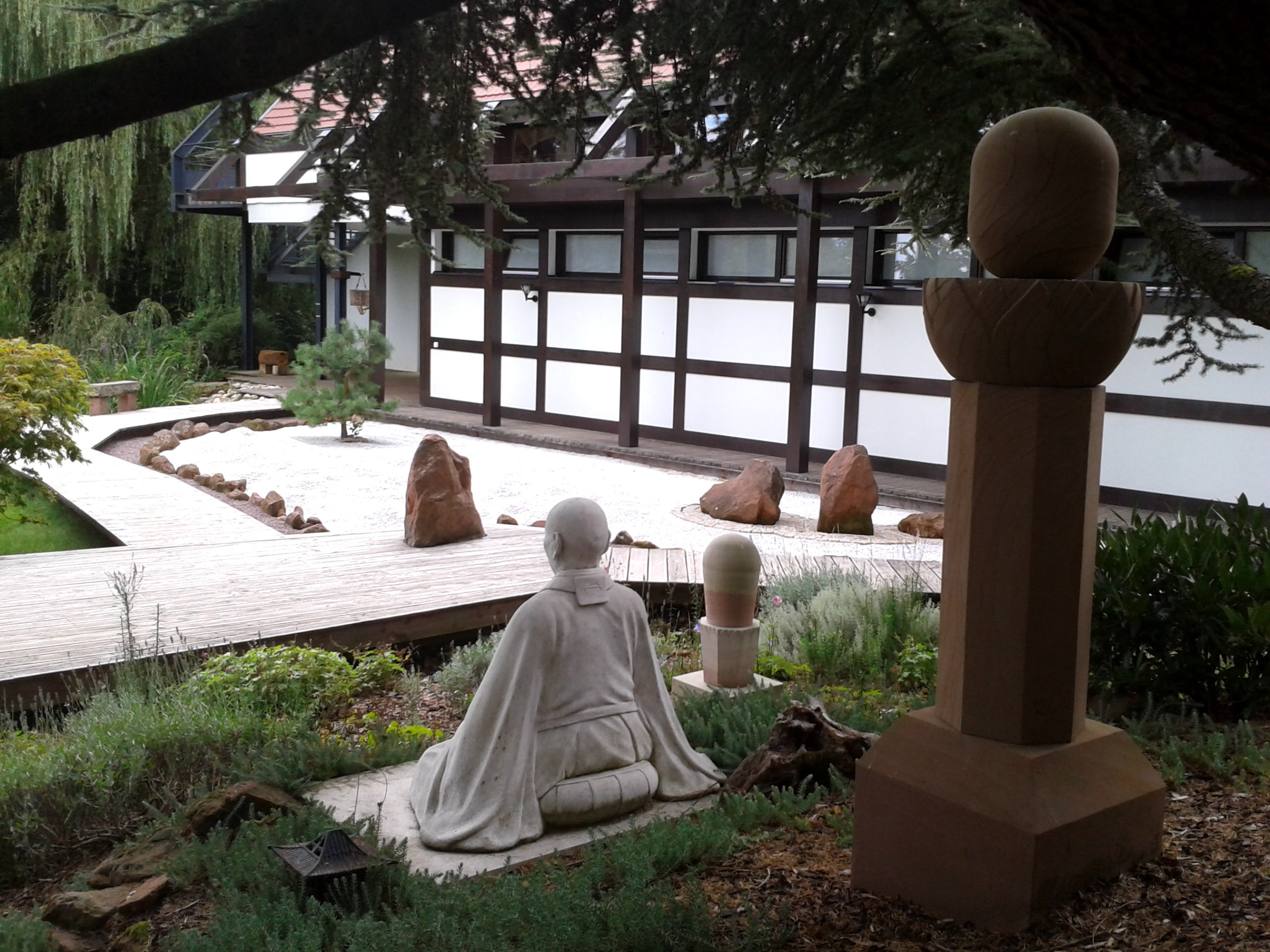
Sculpture of Zen master Taisen Deshimaru in the Zen garden of the temple Kosan Ryumonji. Kosan Ryumon-Ji in Weiterswiller in France

== Selection and arrangement of rocks ==
Stone arrangements and other miniature elements are used to represent mountains and natural water elements and scenes, islands, rivers and waterfalls. Stone and shaped shrubs (karikomi, hako-zukuri topiary) are used interchangeably. In most gardens moss is used as a ground cover to create "land" covered by forest.

The selection and placement of rocks is the most important part of making a Japanese rock garden. In the first known manual of Japanese gardening, the Sakuteiki ("Records of Garden Making"), is expressed as "setting stones", ishi wo tateru koto; literally, the "act of setting stones upright." It laid out very specific rules for choice and the placement of stones, and warned that if the rules were not followed the owner of the garden would suffer misfortune. In Japanese gardening, rocks are classified as either tall vertical, low vertical, arching, reclining, or flat.

For creating "mountains", usually igneous volcanic rocks, rugged mountain rocks with sharp edges, are used. Smooth, rounded sedimentary rocks are used for the borders of gravel "rivers" or "seashores." In Chinese gardens of the Song dynasty, individual rocks which looked like animals or had other unusual features were often the star attraction of the garden. In Japanese gardens, individual rocks rarely play the starring role; the emphasis is upon the harmony of the composition. For arranging rocks, there are many rules in the Sakuteiki, for example:

Make sure that all the stones, right down to the front of the arrangement, are placed with their best sides showing. If a stone has an ugly-looking top you should place it so as to give prominence to its side. Even if this means it has to lean at a considerable angle, no one will notice. There should always be more horizontal than vertical stones. If there are "running away" stones there must be "chasing" stones. If there are "leaning" stones, there must be "supporting" stones.

Rocks are rarely if ever placed in straight lines or in symmetrical patterns. The most common arrangement is one or more groups of three rocks. One common triad arrangement has a tall vertical rock flanked by two smaller rocks, representing Buddha and his two attendants. Other basic combinations are a tall vertical rock with a reclining rock; a short vertical rock and a flat rock; and a triad of a tall vertical rock, a reclining rock and a flat rock. Other important principles are to choose rocks which vary in color, shape and size, to avoid rocks with bright colors which might distract the viewer, and make certain that the grains of rocks run in the same direction.

At the end of the Edo period, a new principle was invented: the use of suteishi, "discarded" or "nameless" rocks, placed in seemingly random places to add spontaneity to the garden. Other important principles of rock arrangement include balancing the number of vertical and horizontal rocks.

== Gravel ==
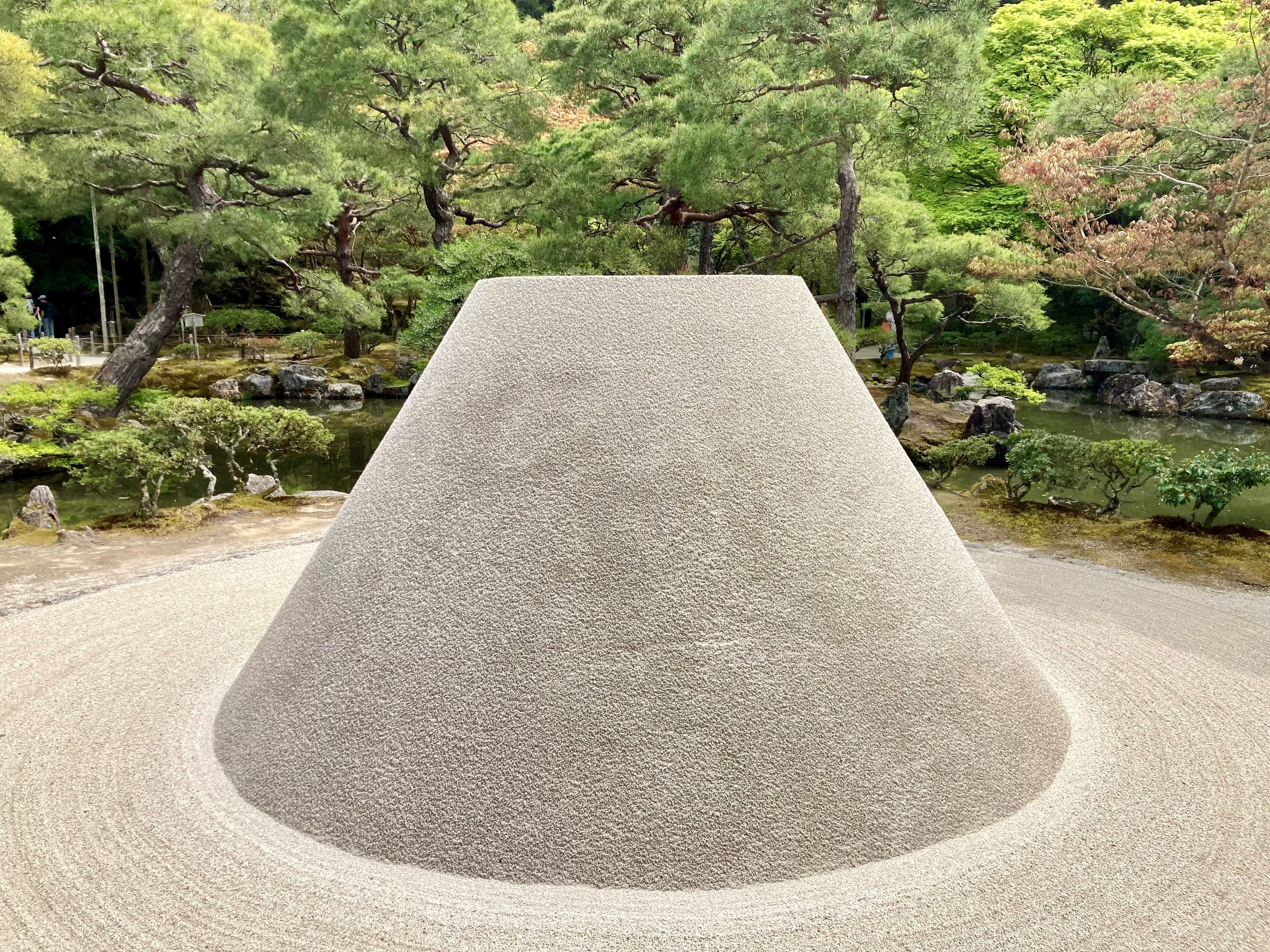
Gravel replica of Mount Fuji (Ginkaku-ji)

Gravel is usually used in Zen gardens, rather than sand, because it is less disturbed by rain and wind. The act of raking the gravel into a pattern recalling waves or rippling water, known as samon (砂紋) or hōkime (箒目), has an aesthetic function. Zen priests practice this raking also to help their concentration. Achieving perfection of lines is not easy. Rakes are according to the patterns of ridges as desired and limited to some of the stone objects situated within the gravel area. Nonetheless, often the patterns are not static. Developing variations in patterns is a creative and inspiring challenge. There are typically four raking patterns, line, wave, scroll, and check.

The gravel used in Japanese gardens is known as "suna" (sand) despite the individual particles being much bigger than those of what is regarded as normal sand. These vary from 2 mm to up to even 30 to 50 mm in size. Gardens in Kyoto have historically used "Shirakawa-suna", (白川砂利, "Shirakawa-sand") which is known for its rather muted colour palette. This type of muted black-speckled granite is a mix of three main minerals, white feldspar, grey quartz, and black mica which matches the aesthetic for most Zen gardens. Shirakawa-suna also has an eroded texture that alternates between jagged and smooth and is prized for its ability to hold raked grooves, with patterns that last weeks unless weather, animals or humans intervene.

As of 2018 in Kyoto alone there are 341 areas spread over 166 temples covering a surface area of over 29,000 m^{2} which have used "Shirakawa-suna". Gravel is used in the entrance, main garden, and corridor area and takes four forms, spread gravel, gravel terrace, gravel pile, and garden path. Typically in areas covering less than 100 m^{2}, the gravel is 20 to 50 mm deep and has a particle size of 9 mm. Among the gardens which used Shirakawa-suna have been Ryōan-ji and Daitoku-ji.

"Shirakawa-suna" was sourced from the upper reaches of the Shirakawa River. However, since the late 1950s the river has been a protected waterway and extraction of gravel from the river has been illegal. Over time the gravel becomes weather-beaten and becomes finer, forcing gardeners to occasionally replenish it in order for the gravel to retain the patterns made in them.

Since the banning of extraction from the Shirakawa River the gravel used for both maintenance of existing gardens and the creation of new ones is sourced from quarried mountain granite of similar composition that is crushed and sieved. However the process of manufacturing creates rounded particles of the same size, lacking the pattern holding characteristics of true "Shirakawa-suna", which have corners and are not uniform in size. For instance the Portland Japanese Garden experimented with granite chips sourced from Canadian quarries to compensate for the loss of access to Shirakawa-suna.

Maintenance of the gravel in Japan is typically undertaken two to three times per month.

== Symbolism ==
In the Japanese rock garden, rocks sometimes symbolize mountains (particularly Horai, the legendary home of the Eight Immortals in Taoist mythology); or they can be boats or a living creature (usually a turtle, or a carp). In a group, they might be a waterfall or a crane in flight.

In the earliest rock gardens of the Heian period, the rocks in a garden sometimes had a political message. As the Sakutei-ki wrote:

Sometimes, when mountains are weak, they are without fail destroyed by water. It is, in other words, as if subjects had attacked their emperor. A mountain is weak if it does not have stones for support. An emperor is weak if he does not have counselors. That is why it is said that it is because of stones that a mountain is sure, and thanks to his subjects that an emperor is secure. It is for this reason that, when you construct a landscape, you must at all cost place rocks around the mountain.

Some classical Zen gardens, like Daisen-in, have symbolism that can be easily read; it is a metaphorical journey on the river of life. Others, like Ryōan-ji, resist easy interpretation. Many different theories have been put forward about what the garden is supposed to represent, from islands in a stream to swimming baby tigers to the peaks of mountains rising above the clouds to theories about secrets of geometry or of the rules of equilibrium of odd numbers. Garden historian Gunter Nitschke wrote: "The garden at Ryōan-ji does not symbolize anything, or more precisely, to avoid any misunderstanding, the garden of Ryōan-ji does not symbolize, nor does it have the value of reproducing a natural beauty that one can find in the real or mythical world. I consider it to be an abstract composition of "natural" objects in space, a composition whose function is to incite meditation."

A recent suggestion by Gert van Tonder of Kyoto University and Michael Lyons of Ritsumeikan University is that the rocks of Ryōan-ji form the subliminal image of a tree. The researchers claim the subconscious mind is sensitive to a subtle association between the rocks. They suggest this may be responsible for the calming effect of the garden.

== Landscape painting and the Zen garden critique ==
Chinese landscape painting was one of the many Chinese arts that came to Japan with Zen Buddhism in the fourteenth century. That the Buddhism of Zen influenced garden design was first suggested not in Japan, but in the West by a Hawaiian garden journalist Loraine Kuck in the 1930s and disputed as such by a scholar of Japanese garden history, Wybe Kuitert in 1988. This was well before scholars jumped on the bandwagon in the 1990s to deconstruct the promotion and reception of Zen. The critique comes down to the fact that Buddhist priests were not trying to express Zen in gardens. A review of the quotes of Buddhist priests that are taken to "prove" Zen for the garden are actually phrases copied from Chinese treatises on landscape painting. Secondary writers on the Japanese garden like Keane and Nitschke, who were associating with Kuitert when he was working on his research at the Kyoto University joined the Zen garden critique, like Kendall H. Brown, who took a similar distance from the Zen garden. In Japan the critique was taken over by Yamada Shouji who took a critical stance to the understanding of all Japanese culture, including gardens, under the nominator of Zen. Christian Tagsold summarized the discussion by placing perceptions of the Japanese garden in the context of an interdisciplinary comparison of cultures of Japan and the West.

Zen priests quote from Chinese treatises on landscape painting indicating that the Japanese rock garden, and its karesansui garden scenery was and still is inspired by or based on first Chinese and later also Japanese landscape painting. Landscape painting and landscape gardening were closely related and practiced by intellectuals, the literati inspired by Chinese culture. A primary design principle was the creation of a landscape based on, or at least greatly influenced by, the three-dimensional monochrome ink (sumi) landscape painting, sumi-e or suiboku-ga.

In Japan, the garden has the same status as a work of art. Though each garden is different in its composition, they mostly use rock groupings and shrubs to represent a classic scene of mountains, valleys and waterfalls taken from Chinese landscape painting. In some cases it might be as abstract as just a few islands in a sea. Any Japanese garden may also incorporate existing scenery outside its confinement, e.g. the hills behind, as "borrowed scenery" (using a technique called Shakkei).

== List of shrines and temples with rock gardens ==
In Kyoto:

- Daitokuji
- Daisen-in
- Jishoji
- Jisso-in
- Myoshinji
- Rozan-ji
- Ryoanji
- Tofukuji

Outside Kyoto:

- An'yō-in (Kobe)
- Bingo-Ankokuji (Fukuyama)
- Harima Ankokuji (Kato, Hyogo)
- Jōmyō-ji (Kamakura)
- Kinbyōzan Zuisenji (Kamakura)
- Kōmyōzen-ji (Fukuoka)
- Shitennoji (Osaka)

== See also ==
- Adelaide Himeji Garden - Sea of Sand
- Japanese garden
- List of garden types
- Higashiyama Bunka in Muromachi period
- Rock garden
- Wabi-sabi

== Bibliography ==
- Wybe Kuitert (1988). Themes, Scenes, and Taste in the History of Japanese Garden Art. Gieben Amsterdam. ISBN 978-90-5063-021-4.
- Wybe Kuitert (2002). Themes in the History of Japanese Garden Art. Hawaii University Press. ISBN 978-0-8248-2312-2.
- David Young; Michiko Young (July 2005). The Art of the Japanese Garden. Tuttle Pub. ISBN 978-0-8048-3598-5.
- Günter Nitschke (2007). Le jardin japonais: Angle droit et forme naturelle. Taschen. ISBN 978-3-8228-3034-5.
- Baridon, Michel (1998). Les Jardins- Paysagistes, Jardiniers, Poetes., Éditions Robert Lafont, Paris, (ISBN 2-221-06707-X)
- Miyeko Murase (1996). L Art Du Japon. LGF/Le Livre de Poche. ISBN 978-2-253-13054-3.
- Danielle Elisseeff (2010-09-23). Jardins japonais. Nouvelles éditions Scala. ISBN 978-2-35988-029-8.
- Virginie Klecka (2011-04-15). Jardins Japonais. Rustica éd. ISBN 978-2-8153-0052-0.
- Christian Tagsold (2017). Spaces in Translation: Japanese Gardens and the West. University of Pennsylvania Press. ISBN 978-0-8122-4674-2.

=== Note ===
*The Sakuteiki is a garden book with notes on garden making that dates back to the late seventeenth century. Its oldest title is Senzai Hishõ, "Secret Extracts on Gardens", and was written nearly 1000 years ago, making it the oldest work on Japanese gardening. It is assumed that this was written in the 11th century by a noble man named Tachibana no Tichitsuna. In this text lies the first mention of the karesansui in literature. Only recently we saw an English modern translation of this gardening classic.
