= Sakuteiki =

11th-century Japanese text on garden-making

Sakuteiki (作庭記; literally, Records of Garden Making) is the oldest published Japanese text on garden-making. It was most likely the work of Tachibana Toshitsuna.

Sakuteiki is most likely the oldest garden planning text in the world. It was written in the mid-to-late 11th century. Later during the Kamakura period, it was referred to as the Senzai Hisshō, or the Secret Selection on Gardens before it acquired the title Sakuteiki in the Edo period.

== Overview ==
The unillustrated Sakuteiki is the first systematic record of the styles of gardening in the Heian period, which had been the product of oral tradition for many years. It precisely defines the art of landscape gardening as an aesthetic endeavor based on poetic feeling of the designer and the site. It enumerates five styles of gardening, including

- 大海の様, the "Ocean Style" (taikai no yō)
- 山河の様, the "Mountain Torrent Style" (yama kawa no yō)
- 大河の様, the "Broad River Style" (taiga no yō)
- 沼池の様, the "Wetland Style" (numa ike no yō)
- 蘆手の様, the "Reed Style" (ashide no yō)

The Sakuteiki was written in a time during which the placing of stones was the most important part of gardening, and it literally defined the art of garden making, using the expression ishi wo tateru koto (石を立てること, literally, "the act of standing up stones") to mean not only stone placement but garden making itself. It advises the reader not only how to place the stones but also how to follow the "desire" of the stones.

== See also ==
- Japanese garden
- Japanese rock garden
