= Horai =

Horai or Hōrai may refer to:

== Places in Japan ==
- Hōrai, Aichi, former town in Aichi Prefecture now merged into the city of Shinshiro
- Hōrai Bridge, bridge over the Ōi River in Shimada, Shizuoka Prefecture
- Hōrai Station, railway station in Ōtsu, Shiga Prefecture
- Hōrai Valley, valley in Hyōgo Prefecture

== Other uses ==
- Horae (also spelled "Horai"), group of ancient Greek goddesses
- Makiko Horai (born 1979), Japanese volleyball player
- Mount Penglai, legendary mountain referred to as "Hōrai" in Japanese mythology
- Yoshimitsu Hōrai, fictional member of the Tokyo Metropolitan Police Department in the anime series Darker than Black
