= Kobe Future City =

Public foundation in Japan

Kobe Future City Co., Ltd. (株式会社こうべ未来都市機構, Kabushiki-gaisha Kōbe Mirai Toshi Kikō) is a private corporation that specialises in facility management services including shopping centers, office and station buildings, public facilities and sports & recreation venues, as well as marine access and ropeway & cable car operations.

== History ==
Note: the history below mostly indicates the business changes related to the ropeway & cable car operations.

- 1963: Kōbe City Urban Development Corporation (神戸市都市整備公社, Kōbe-shi Toshi Kaihatsu Kōsha), was founded as a public foundation in Kōbe, Hyōgo, Japan. Its business functions included urban redevelopment projects and land readjustment work.
- 1965 & 1973: Following changes in the legal system, part of its business were transferred to the newly established Kobe City Housing Supply Corporation in 1965, and to the Kobe City Land Development Corporation in 1973.
- 1972: Takes over the Rokko-Arima Ropeway business from Rokko-Arima Ropeway Co., Ltd.
- April 1, 2012: Transitioned from a foundation to a public corporation, and takes over some of the business functions of the Kobe City Housing Supply Corporation and the Kobe City Land Development Corporation
- January 1, 2013: Business name was changed to Kobe Sumai Machizukuri Public Corporation.
- May 1, 2022, Business name was changed to Kobe Residential Management Authority.
- April 1, 2023, multiple business operations (including its ropeway and cable business) transferred to Kobe Future City Co., Ltd.

== Ropeway and cable business ==
As a part of its ropeway and cable business, the corporation operates three aerial lifts and a funicular line at Mount Rokkō and Mount Maya.

- Rokkō Arima Ropeway It was a longest aerial tramway system in Japan, until Omote-Rokkō Line went out of service in 2004.
- Maya View Line Yume-Sanpo
  - Maya Cable: A funicular line handed over from Rokkō Maya Railway.
  - Maya Ropeway: Transferred from Kōbe Municipal Transportation Bureau.

=== Previously operated ropeway ===
Kōbe Nunobiki Ropeway (Herb Gardens Bottom Station—Herb Gardens Top Station), formerly known as Shin-Kōbe Ropeway (Kōbe Yume—Fūsen), was owned until April 2009 when it was sold to Kobe City. The change of name to Kōbe Nunobiki Ropeway took place on April 1, 2011.
