= Mount Maya =

Mountain in Hyōgo Prefecture, Japan

- 摩耶山
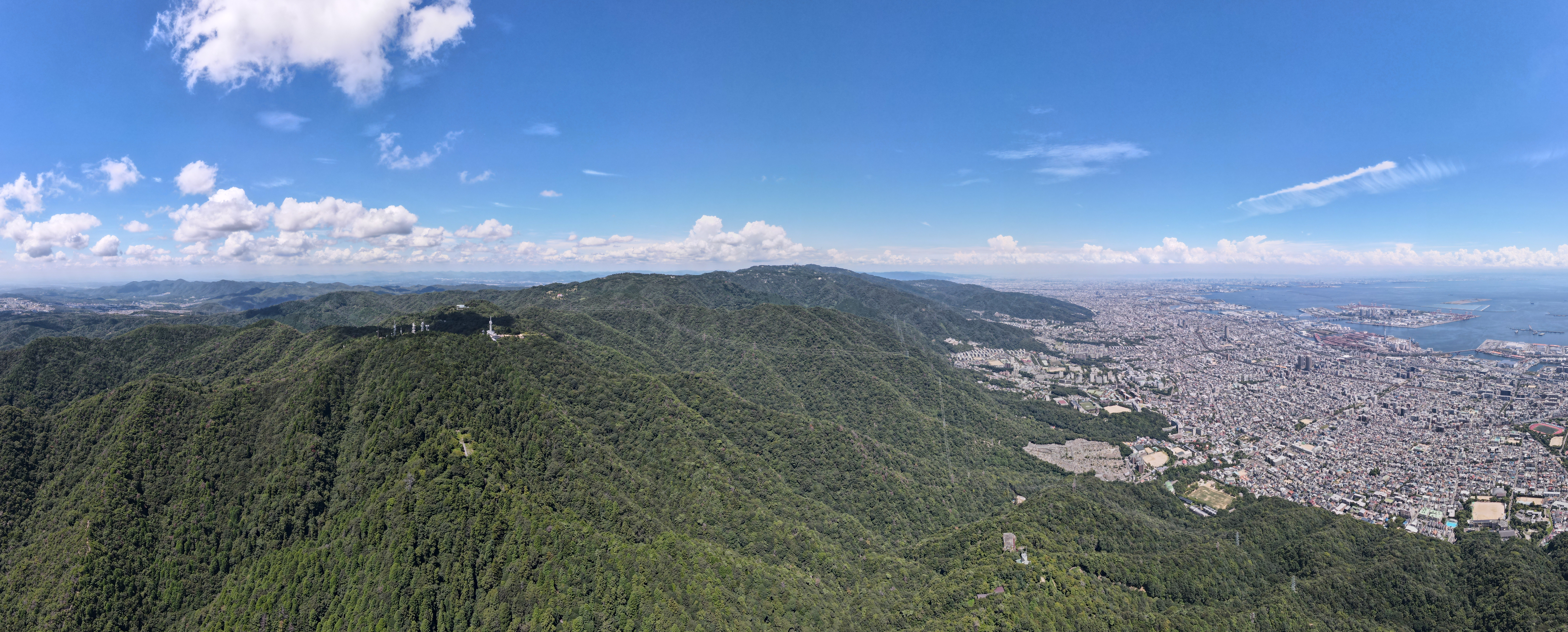
- Aerial drone panorama of Mount Maya

Highest point
- Elevation: 698.6 m (2,292 ft)
- Coordinates: 34°43.975′N 135°12.2666′E

Naming
- Language of name: Japanese

Geography
- Location: Kobe, Hyōgo, Japan
- Parent range: Rokko Mountains

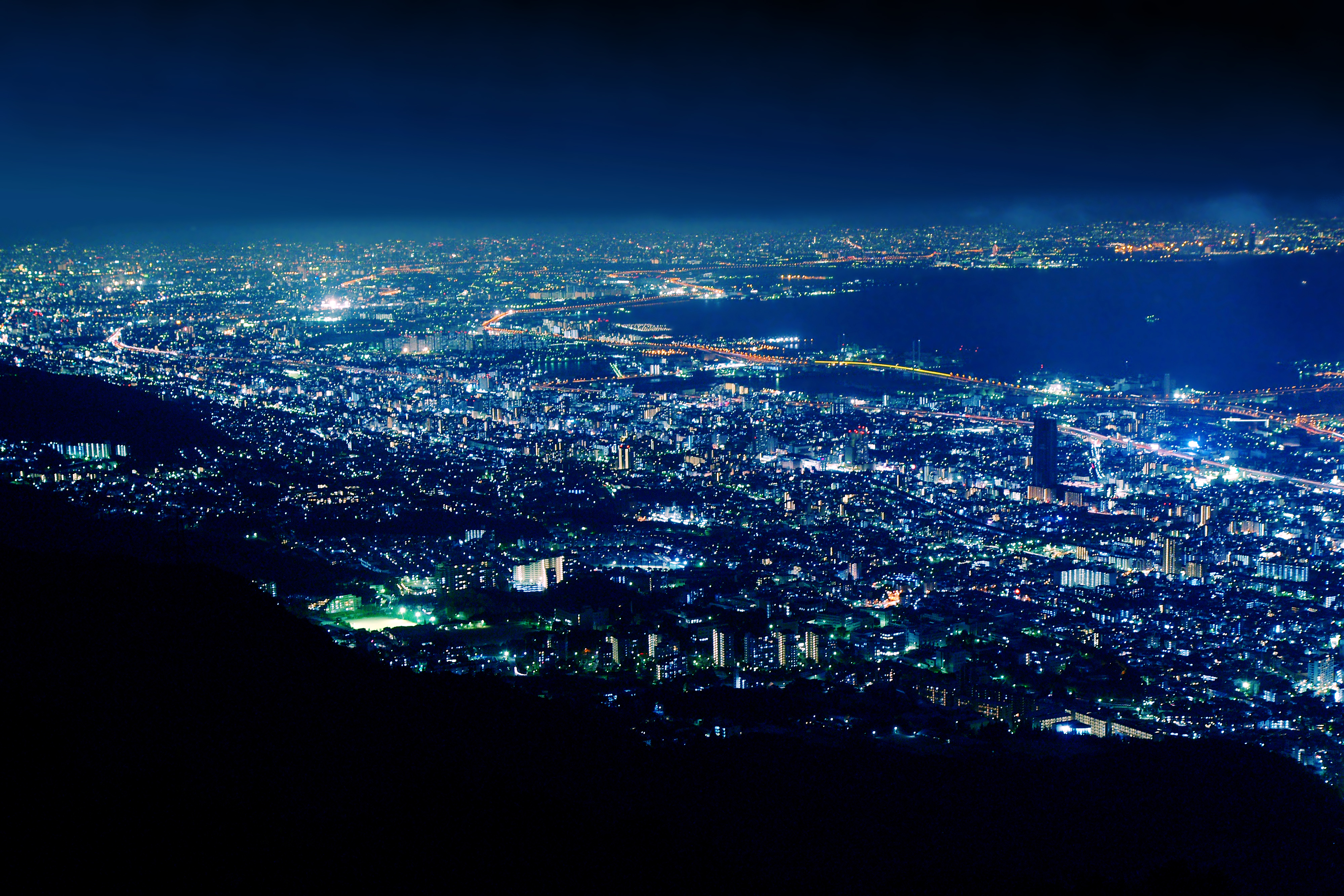
The "Ten Million Dollar Night View" in Kobe

Mount Maya (摩耶山, Maya-san) is a 698.6-metre-high (2,292 ft) mountain in Kobe, Hyōgo Prefecture, Japan. This mountain is one of the major peaks of the Rokkō Mountains, and is the most popular peak for visitors on the West-Rokkō Mountains.

== Outline ==
Mount Maya is one of the two centers in Rokko Mountains for tourists. Mount Maya has a link from the foot of the mountain to the top. Those are Maya Cableway and Maya Ropeway. This mountain has also easy access to the foot through Okumaya Driveway. Mount Maya area was linked to the Kinenhidai area and the top of Mount Rokko by bus. This mountain is a part of Setonaikai National Park, and famous for the view from the mountain. Especially from Kikuseidai, a park just aside of the top of the mountain, visitor can see all over Osaka Bay area including, Kobe, Nishinomiya, Amagasaki, Osaka, Sakai, and two major airports in this area, Kansai International Airport and Kobe Airport. The night view is called a "ten million dollar night view" and is one of Japan's top three, along with Hakodate and Nagasaki.

== History ==
The history of Mount Maya is closely linked to that of Tenjō-ji temple. Tenjo-ji temple was said to be established in 646 by High Monk Hodo, at the Emperor Kotoku's behest. In the 8th century, another High Monk Kobo brought back a statue of Maya, the mother of Buddha, from ancient India, and dedicated it to this temple. The name of this mountain has its origin in this story.

Tenjo-ji was an influential temple for a long time, but the original temple which was located very near to the top of the mountain was burned by a pyromaniac in 1975. The temple has been reestablished at a northern and higher place from the original. The present day statue of Maya (mother of Buddha) was sculpted in Jaipur in India and was donated by an Indian resident of Kobe as part of the temple's restorative efforts in 1976.

== Access ==
There are a lot of ways to reach to the peak of the mountain. These routes are by cableway and rope way:

- Maya Cable Shita – (Maya Cable) - Niji no Eki – (Maya Ropeway) – Hoshi no Eki
- Rokko Cable Shita – (Rokko Cableway) – Rokko Sanjo – (Rokko Maya Sky-Shuttle Bus) – Mount Maya
- Kitano Itchome - (Shinkobe Ropeway) – Nunobiki Hurb Garden – (Walk) – Mount Maya
- Shin-Kobe Station – (Walk: Kyumayado - Gakko Rindo - Tengumichi) – Mount Maya
- Maya Cable Shita – (Walk: Uenomichi) – Mount Maya

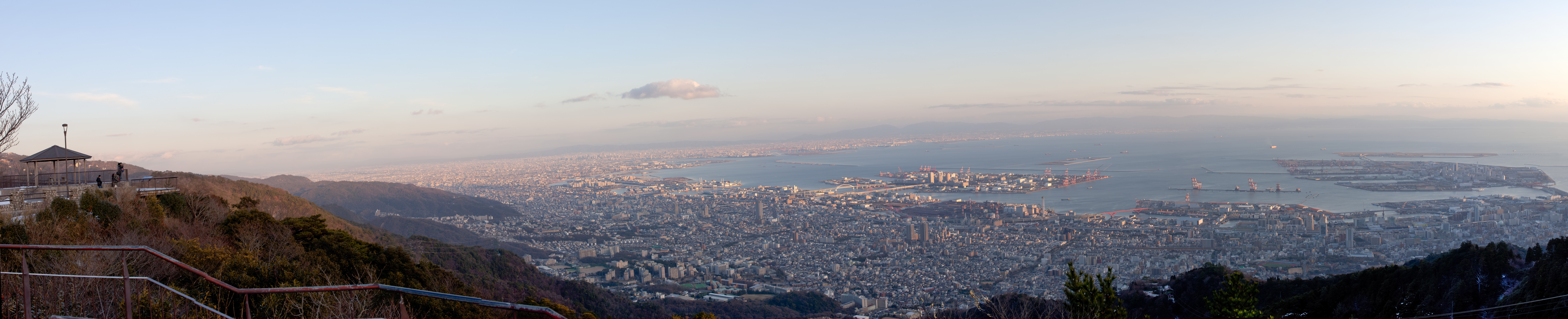
Panoramic view from the mount

== See also ==
- Japanese gunboat Maya
- Japanese cruiser Maya
- JMSDF Destroyer Maya
- Maya Station, a nearby railway station named after the mountain
