= Tenjō-ji =

Buddhist temple in Hyōgo Prefecture, Japan

Coordinates: 34°44′20.39″N 135°12′16.93″E

Tōri Tenjō-ji 忉利天上寺
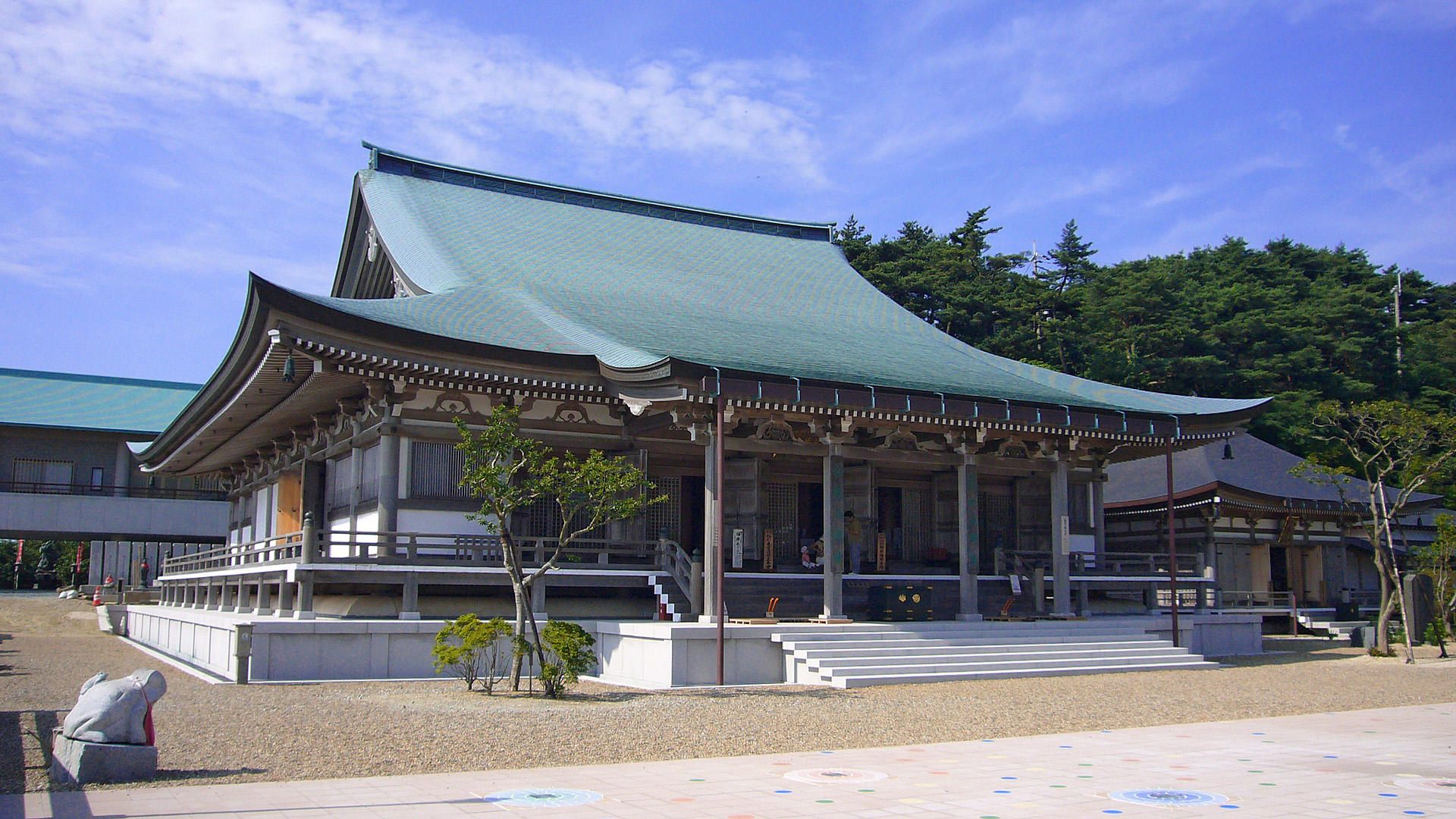
- Main temple (Jintang)

Religion
- Affiliation: Buddhism

Location
- Location: 2-12 Mayayama-dori, Nada-ku, Kobe-shi, Hyogo-ken, 657-0105
- Country: Kobe, Japan
- Interactive map of Tōri Tenjō-ji 忉利天上寺

Architecture
- Founder: Hōdō
- Completed: 646

Website
- http://www.mayasan-tenjoji.jp/

Tōri Tenjō-ji (忉利天上寺), officially Mayazan Tenjō-ji (仏母摩耶山天上寺) or Mayazan Tenjō-ji (摩耶山天上寺), is a Shingon Buddhist temple in eastern Kobe, Hyōgo Prefecture, Japan. The temple is located on Mount Maya (699 metres (2,293 ft)) in the Nada ward of Kobe.

== History ==
Tenjō-ji was, by tradition, established during the Asuka period (538 – 710) by the semi-mythical monk Hōdō (fl. 7th century). Hōdō, by tradition, was born in India, and traveled to Japan via China and the Baekje kingdom in Korea. Hōdō cured an illness of the Emperor Kōtoku (596 – 654), who then sent the monk to establish numerous Buddhist temples. According to legend Hōdō founded Tenjō-ji in 646.

In the 8th century, another High Monk Kobo brought back a statue of Maya, the mother of Buddha from China, and dedicated it to this temple.

Tenjō-ji was an influential temple for a long time, but the original temple which was located very near to the top of the mountain was burned by a pyromaniac in 1975. The temple has been reestablished at a northern and higher place from the original.

The name of Mount Maya has its origin in the story of this temple.
