= Hōdō =

Indian hermit and sage

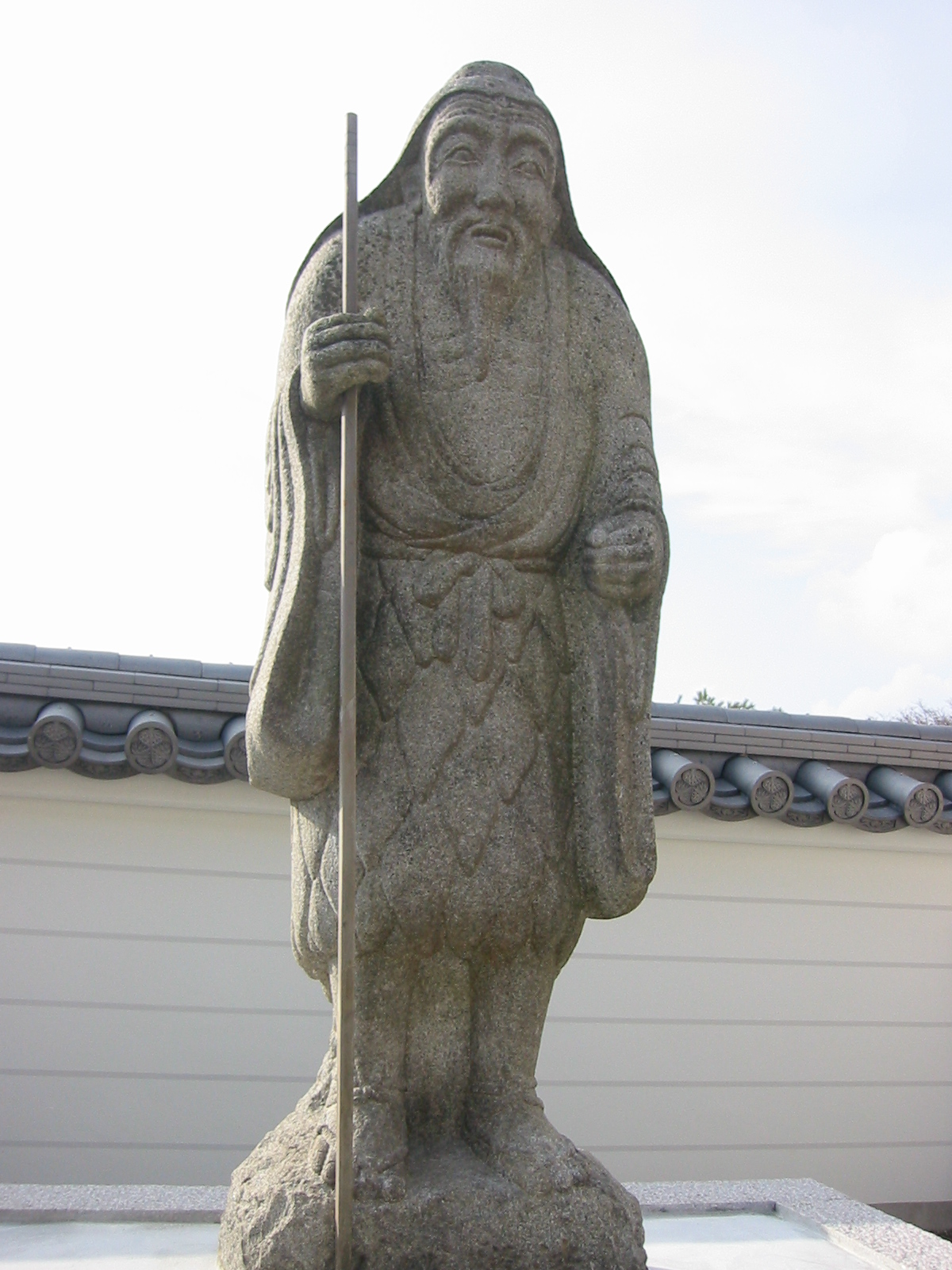
Hōdō Sennin

Hōdō (法道) or Hōdō Sennin (法道仙人) was an Indian hermit and sage.

According to legend, from the 6th to 7th centuries CE, Hōdō traveled from India peninsula through Tang China and the Korean kingdom of Baekje and eventually arrived in Japan. He is recognized as the founder of temples in the mountains of Harima Province and is associated with several chokugan-ji (勅願寺), Buddhist temples built at the request of the reigning emperor.

Tradition holds that when Hōdō came to Japan, he was accompanied by the deity Gozu Tennō (牛頭天王; Sanskrit: Gośīrṣa devarāja), who was later enshrined at Hiromine Shrine and Yasaka Shrine and is venerated in the Gion faith.

While engaged in ascetic practice on Mount Rokkō at the Kumoga Iwa Rock (雲ヶ岩), Hōdō is said to have been approached by the deity Vaiśravaṇa riding on purple clouds. It was after this encounter that Hōdō built Tamon-ji in Hyōgo Prefecture to enshrine the Kumoga Iwa Rock, Rokkō-Hime-Daizen-no-Kami (六甲比命大善神), and the Shinkyō Iwa Rock. Ashiya Dōman describes himself as a student of Hōdō.

== Other names ==
Legend says that Hōdō would fly through the air with food and money in an iron bowl to offer to those in need, which gained him the nickname Hihatsu no Hōdō (飛鉢の法道, lit. 'Flying Bowl Hōdō').

It is also said that on one occasion, he happened upon a ship carrying rice that had been paid as land tax. Hōdō asked for one bowl of rice, which the tax man refused. As a result, when Hōdō flew away, the bags of rice rose into the air and followed him. The tax man pursued the ascetic into the mountains and apologized for his miserliness. He promised to provide Hōdō with one bowl of rice for the return of his rice bags.

As the area around Ichijō-ji is known for its high-quality rice production, it is said that this originated from the bowl of rice procured by Hōdō. For this reason, he is also known as Kūhatsu Sennin (空鉢仙人, lit. 'Empty Bowl Sage'), as he always gave away whatever he had obtained in his iron bowl.

== Affiliated temples ==
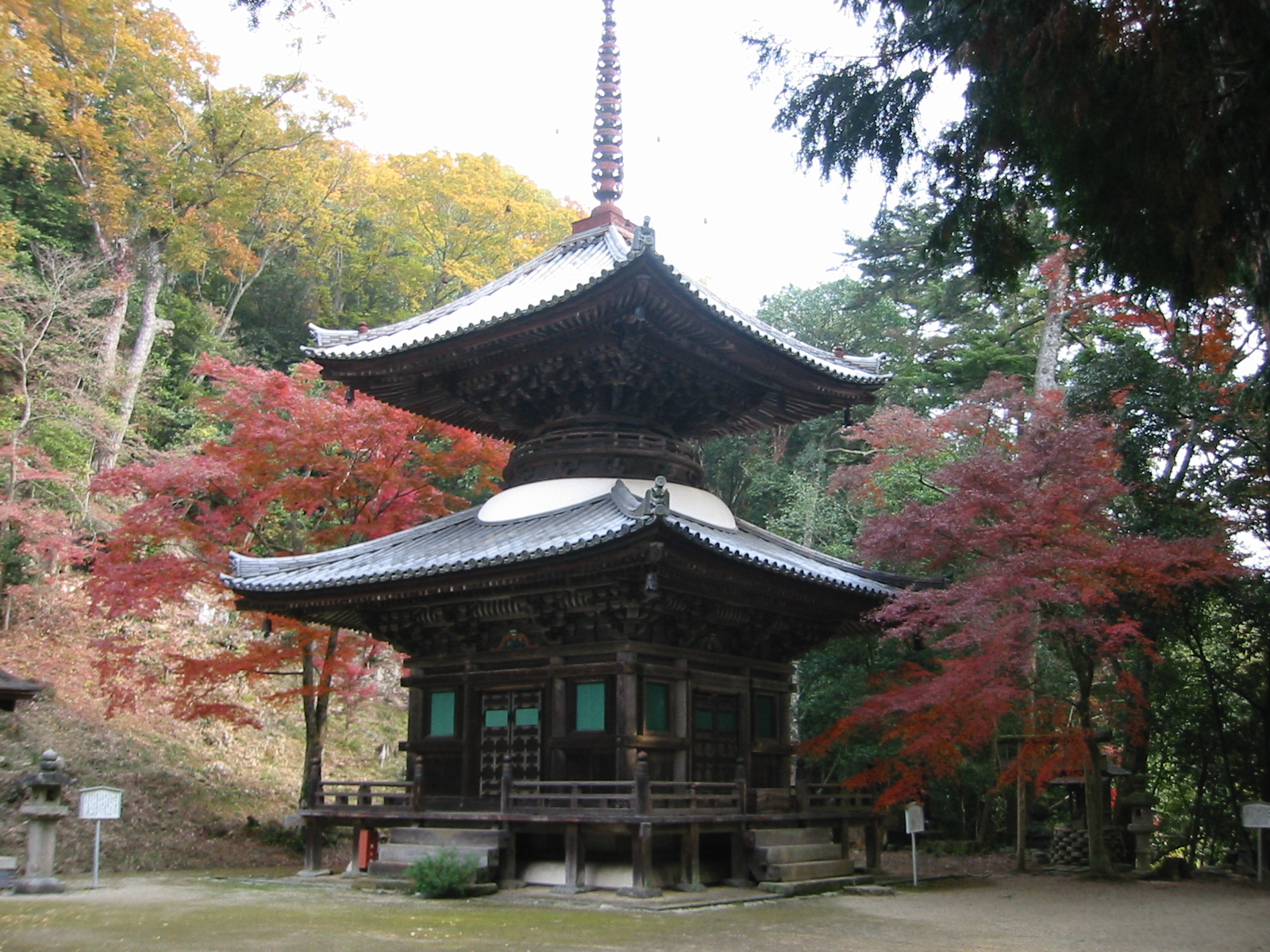
Gaya-in

- Senkō-ji, in Tonami, Toyama Prefecture
- Kannon-ji, in Fukuchiyama, Kyoto Prefecture
- Gaya-in, in Miki, Hyōgo Prefecture
- Kyōkai-ji, in Miki, Hyōgo Prefecture
- Ichijō-ji, in Kasai, Hyōgo Prefecture
- Fukō-ji, in Kasai, Hyōgo Prefecture
- Okusan-ji, in Kasai, Hyōgo Prefecture

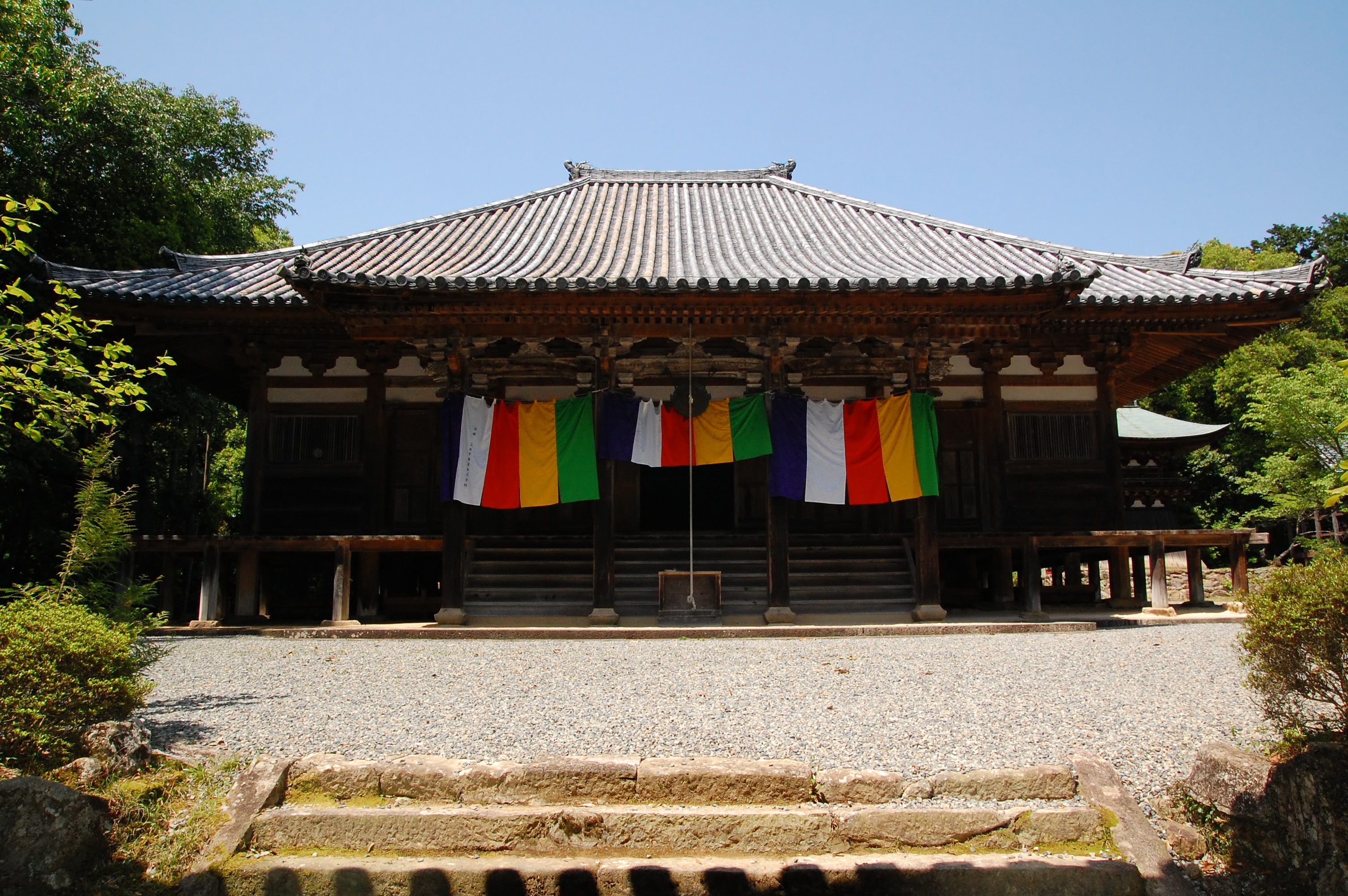
Chōkō-ji

- Nyoi-ji, in Kōbe, Hyōgo Prefecture
- Shakubu-ji, in Kōbe, Hyōgo Prefecture
- Tōri Tenjō-ji, in Kōbe, Hyōgo Prefecture
- Kinkō-ji, in Kōbe, Hyōgo Prefecture
- Hōju-ji, in Kōbe, Hyōgo Prefecture
- Tamon-ji, in Kōbe, Hyōgo Prefecture
- Chōkō-ji, in Katō, Hyōgo Prefecture

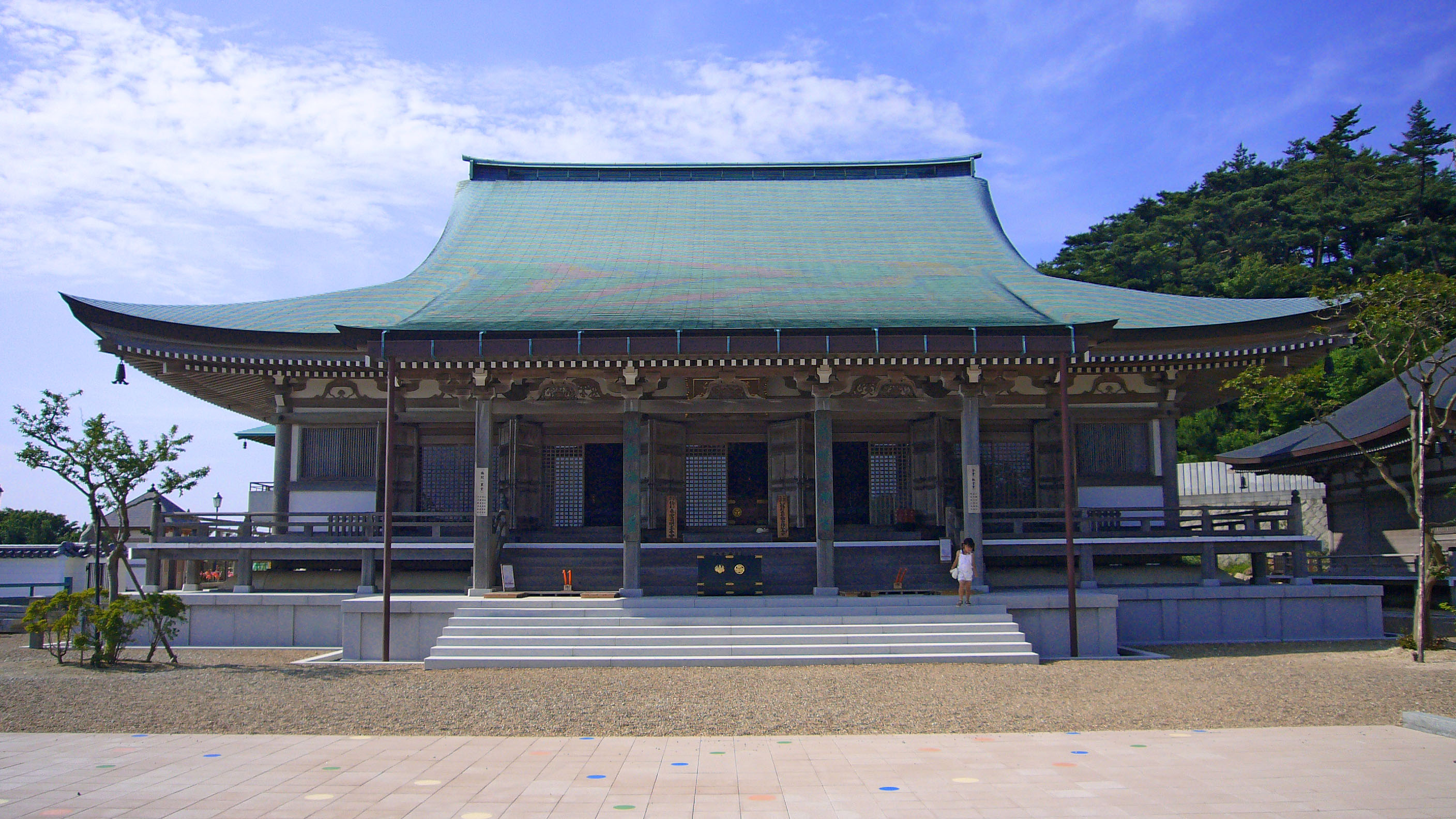
Tōri Tenjō-ji

- Zenryū-ji, in Katō, Hyōgo Prefecture
- Kiyomizu-dera, in Katō, Hyōgo Prefecture
- Kōmyō-ji, in Katō, Hyōgo Prefecture
- Saihō-ji, in Tamba-Sasayama, Hyōgo Prefecture
- Tōkutsu-ji, in Tamba-Sasayama, Hyōgo Prefecture
- Sairin-ji, in Nishiwaki, Hyōgo Prefecture
- Bodai-ji, in Sanda, Hyōgo Prefecture

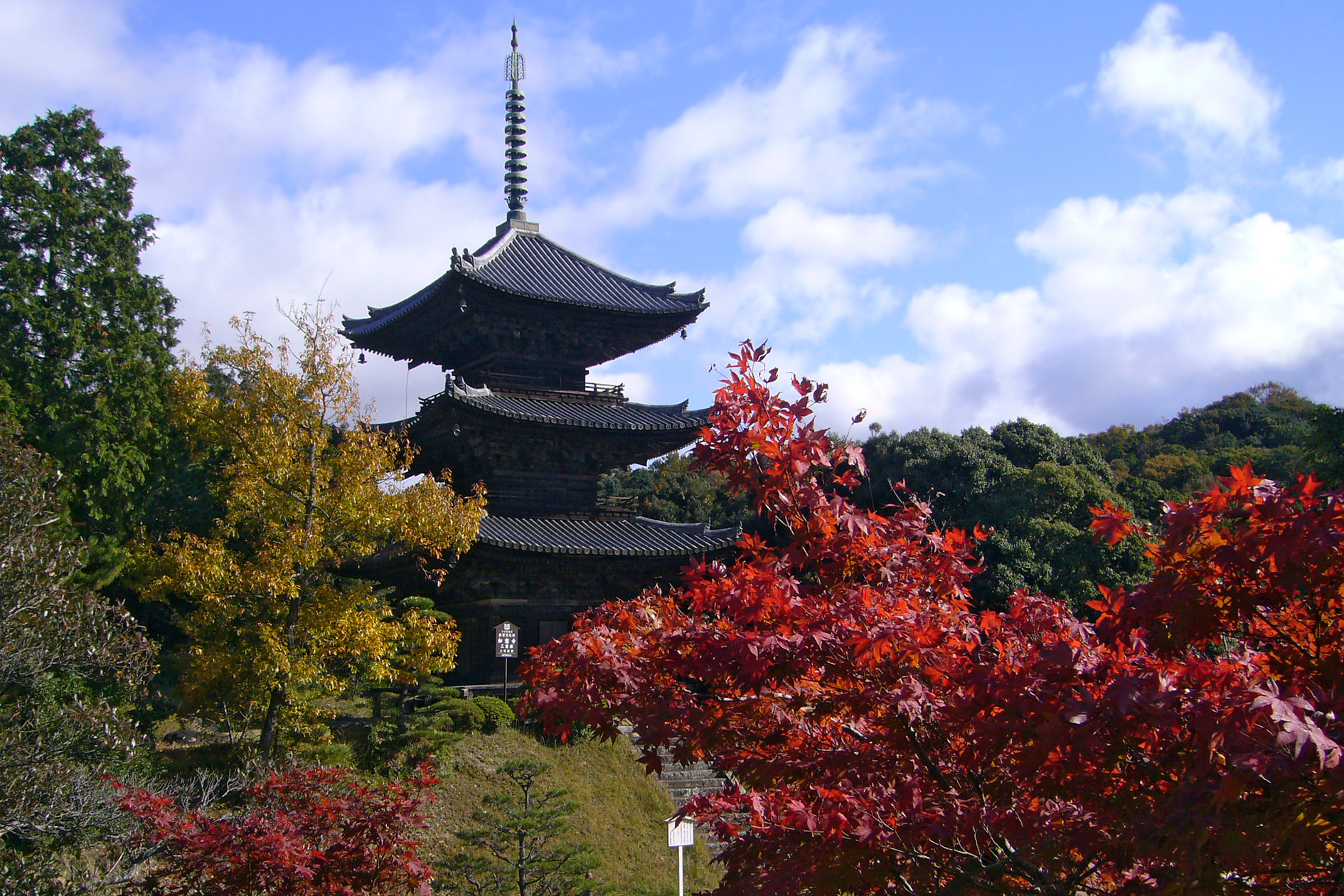
Nyoi-ji

- Jōshō-ji, in Tanba, Hyōgo Prefecture
- Hōraku-ji, in Kamikawa, Hyōgo Prefecture
- Shippō-ji, in Kamikawa, Hyōgo Prefecture
- Enman-ji, in Taka, Hyōgo Prefecture
- Hōdō-ji, in Asago, Hyōgo Prefecture
- Chōkoku-ji, in Kurayoshi, Tottori Prefecture
- Senryū-ji, in Shikokuchūō, Ehime Prefecture
- Rakan-ji, in Nakatsu, Ōita Prefecture

== See also ==
- Sennin
- Vaiśravaṇa
- Emperor Kōtoku
- Wakan Sansai Zue
