= Maya Cablecar =

Funicular line in Kobe, Hyōgo, Japan

Coordinates: 34°43′37.1″N 135°12′44.5″E

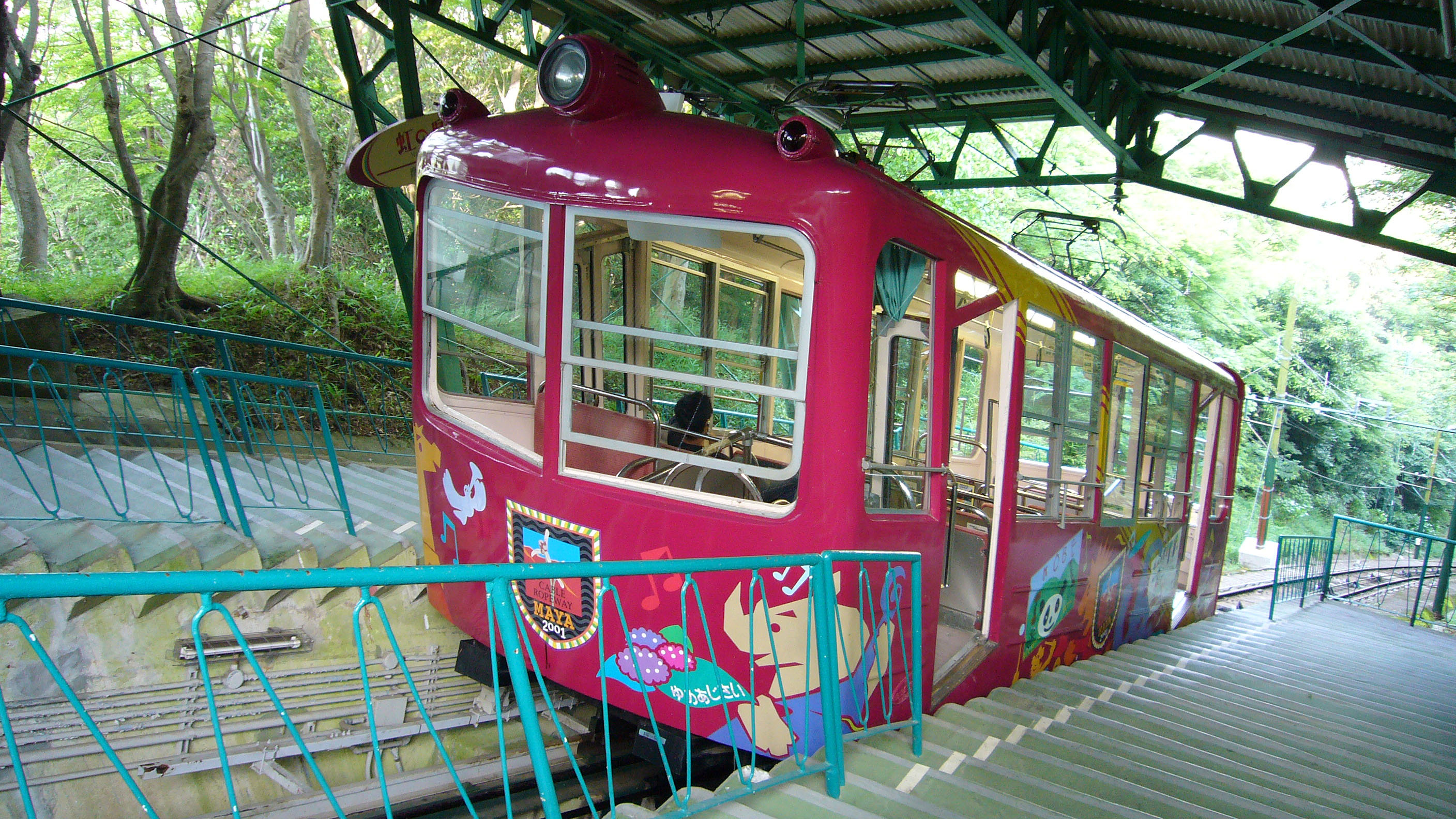
- The funicular in 2006

Overview
- Status: Operational
- Termini: Maya Cable; Niji
- Stations: 2

Service
- System: Funicular railway

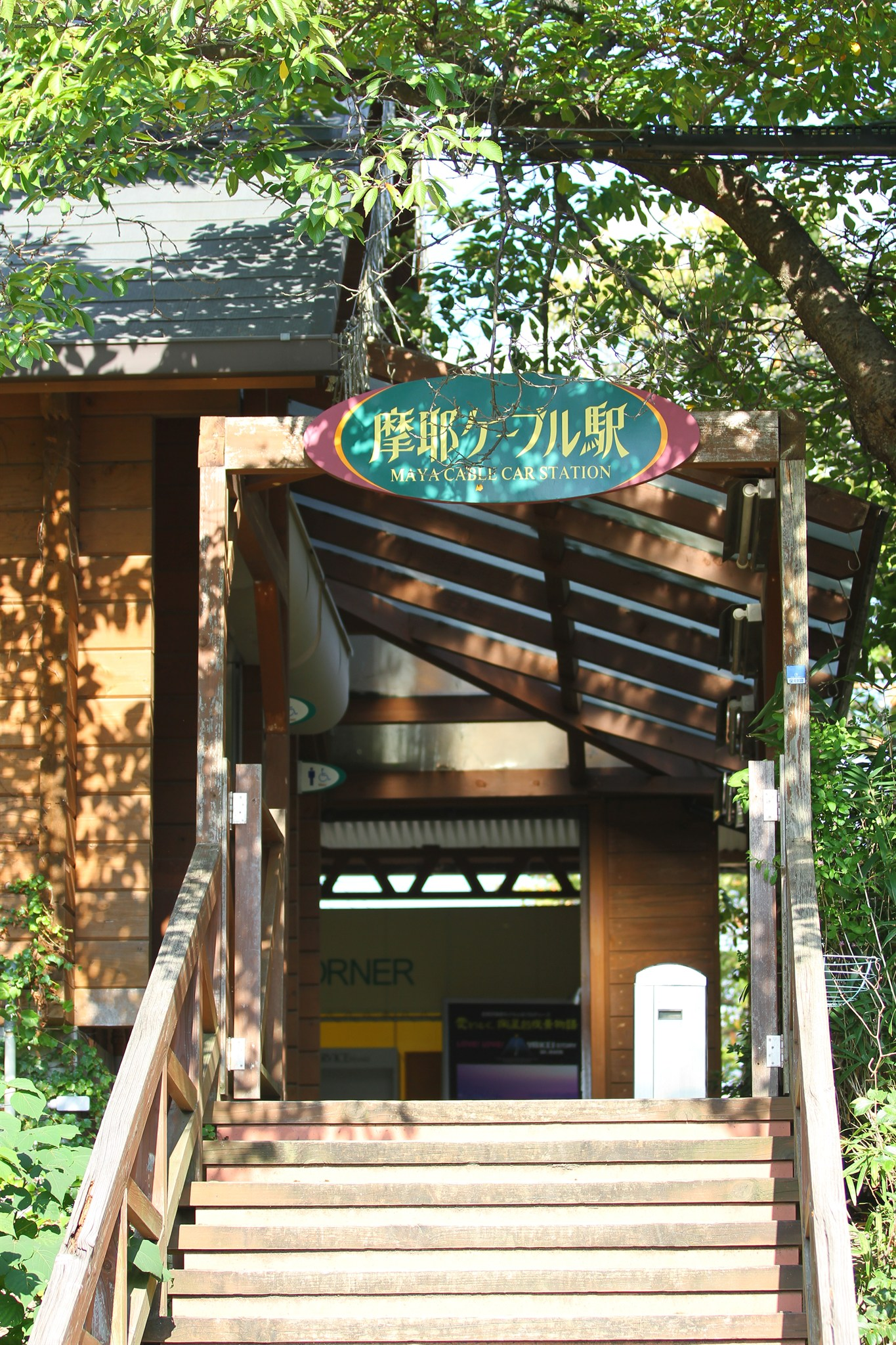
Maya Cablecar Station

The Maya Cablecar, officially the Maya Cable Line (摩耶ケーブル線, Maya Kēburu-sen) is a funicular line in Kobe, Hyōgo, Japan, operated by the public company Kobe Future City Corporation. The line opened in 1925, originally as a route to Tōri Tenjō-ji temple on Mount Maya. Now the line is used to see the scenic view of Kobe. Together with Maya Ropeway, the line has an official nickname Maya View Line Yume-Sanpo (まやビューライン夢散歩, Maya Byū Rain Yume-Sanpo; "Maya View Line Dreamy Stroll").

== Surroundings ==
- Hyogo Prefectural Kobe High School (兵庫県立神戸高等学校)
- The tunnel of cherry trees (桜のトンネル)

== Access ==
There is no car parking available near Maya Cable Station and visitors are advised that they should use public transportation.

As of March 2025, the following bus routes service Maya Cablecar:

Bus stop at entrance to Maya Cable Station:

- Kobe City Bus Route 18: Kobe-sannomiya Station ↔ Maya Cable Station ↔ Hankyu Rokko Station ↔ JR Rokkōmichi Station. Operates hourly on weekdays and every 30 minutes on weekends and public holidays.
- Kobe Minato Kanko Bus Route 51 'Saka Bus': JR Nada Station ↔ Maya Cable Station. Operates every 20 minutes.

Bus stop at Kannonji Temple ('Kannonji' Bus Stop) approx. 10 minute steep up-hill walk to Maya Cable Station:

- Kobe City Bus Route 2: Sannomiya Station ↔ Kannonji Temple ('Kannonji' Bus Stop) ↔ Hankyu Rokko Station. High frequency bus route, operating every 6-8 minutes every day.

== See also ==
- List of funicular railways
- List of railway companies in Japan
- List of railway lines in Japan
- Maya Ropeway
- Rokkō Arima Ropeway
- Rokkō Cable Line
- Shin-Kōbe Ropeway
- Kobe Future City Corporation
