= Rokkō Arima Ropeway =

Cable car line in Kōbe, Hyōgo, Japan

Coordinates: 34°45′58″N 135°14′49″E

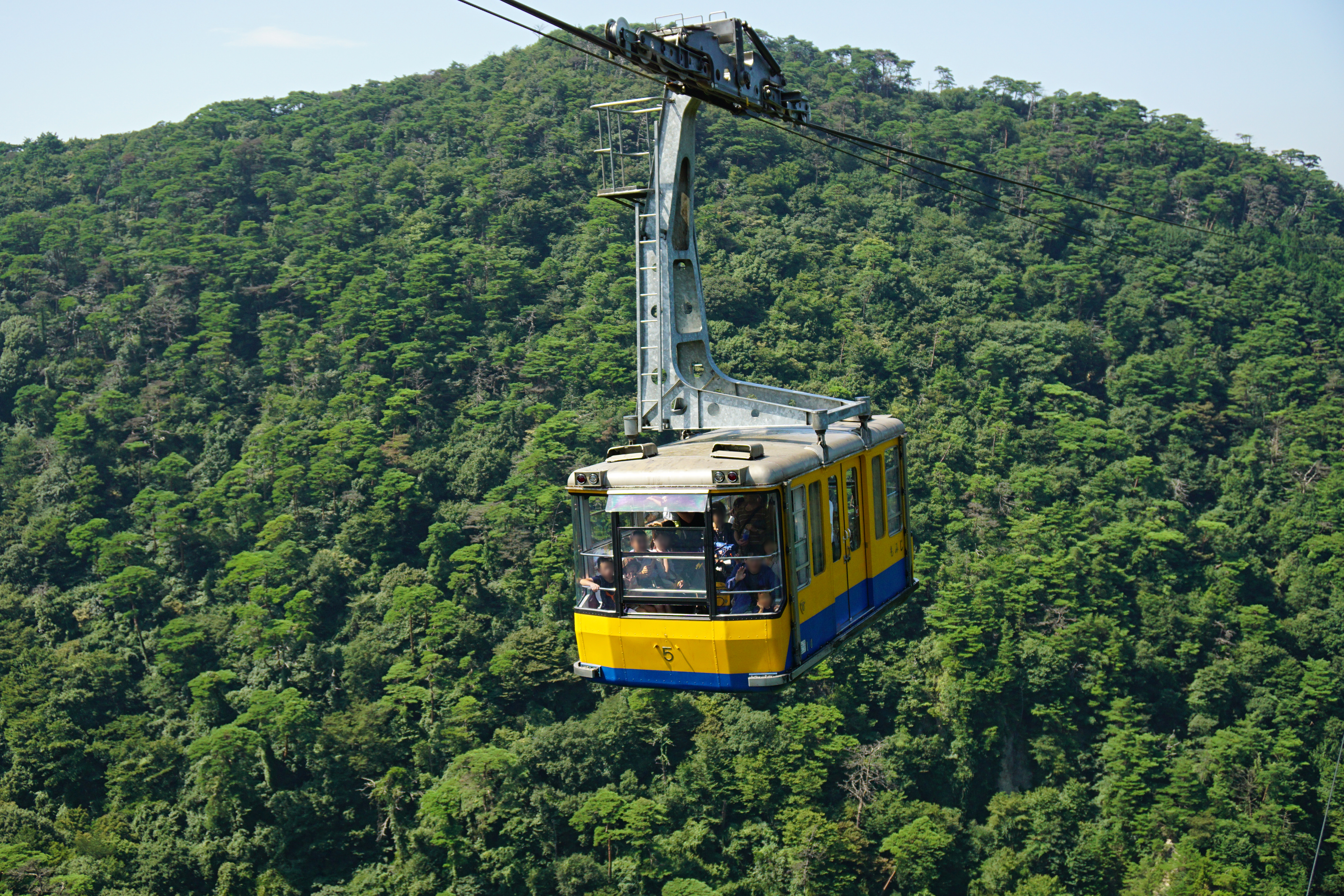

Overview
- Native name: 六甲有馬ロープウェイ

Service
- Type: Aerial lift

The Rokkō Arima Ropeway (六甲有馬ロープウェー, Rokkō Arima Rōpuwē) is an aerial lift line in Kōbe, Hyōgo, Japan, operated by Kōbe City Urban Development. Opened in 1970, the line links Mount Rokkō and Arima Onsen hot spring. The aerial lift consisted of two lines, Ura-Rokkō Line (裏六甲線, Ura-Rokkō-sen) and Omote-Rokkō Line (表六甲線, Omote-Rokkō-sen). The latter having been abandoned in December 2004.

== History ==
The ropeway opened in 1970. Ridership declined after the 1995 Hanshin earthquake, leading to the suspension of the Omote-Rokko Line in December 2004 combined with mounting maintenance cost.

== Basic data ==
This is the data of Ura-Rokkō Line.

- System: Aerial tramway, one track rope, two haulage ropes
- Cable length: 2.8 kilometres (1.7 mi)
- Longest span: 627 m (2,057 ft)
- Spans: 7
- Vertical interval: 441 m (1,447 ft)
- Passenger capacity per a cabin: 61
- Cabins: 2
- Main engine: 200 kW DC motor
- Operational speed: 5 m/s
- Time required for single ride: 12 minutes

== See also ==
- Maya Ropeway
- Shin-Kōbe Ropeway
- Maya Cablecar
- Rokkō Cable Line
- List of aerial lifts in Japan
