= Maya Ropeway =

Cable car in Japan

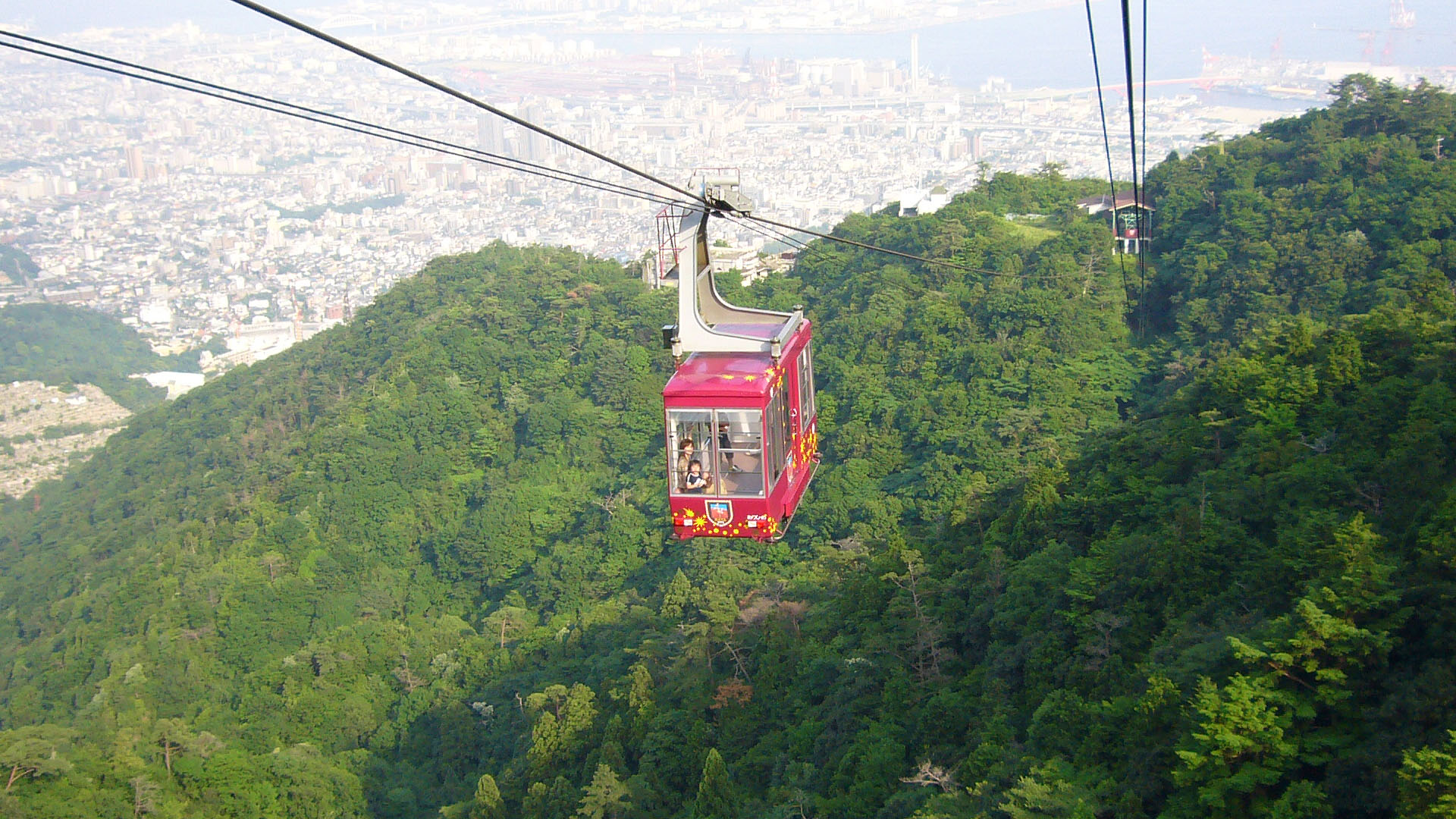
- Interactive map of Maya Ropeway

Overview
- Status: Operational
- Character: Aerial tramway
- Location: Kōbe, Hyōgo, Japan
- No. of stations: 2
- Open: 1955

Operation
- Operator: Kōbe City Urban Development
- Carrier capacity: 29 Passengers per cabin, 2 cabins
- Trip duration: 5 min

Technical features
- Line length: 856 m (2,808 ft)
- No. of cables: 3
- Operating speed: 3.6 m/s (11.8 ft/s)
- Vertical Interval: 222 m (728 ft)

The Maya Ropeway (摩耶ロープウェー, Maya Rōpuwē) is an aerial lift line in Kōbe, Hyōgo, Japan, operated by Kōbe City Urban Development. Together with Maya Cablecar, the line has an official nickname Maya View Line Yume-Sanpo (まやビューライン夢散歩, Maya Byū Rain Yume-Sanpo; "Maya View Line Dreamy Stroll"). Opened in 1955, the line climbs Mount Maya, with a scenic view of the city known as Kikuseidai.

== Basic data ==
- Cable length: 856 m (2,808 ft)
- Vertical interval: 222 m (728 ft)
- Spans: 1
- Main engine: 75 kW (100.6 hp) three-phase motor

== See also ==
- List of aerial lifts in Japan
- Maya Cablecar
- Rokkō Arima Ropeway
- Rokkō Cable Line
- Shin-Kōbe Ropeway
