= Kikuseidai =

Coordinates: 34.734167°N 135.206389°E

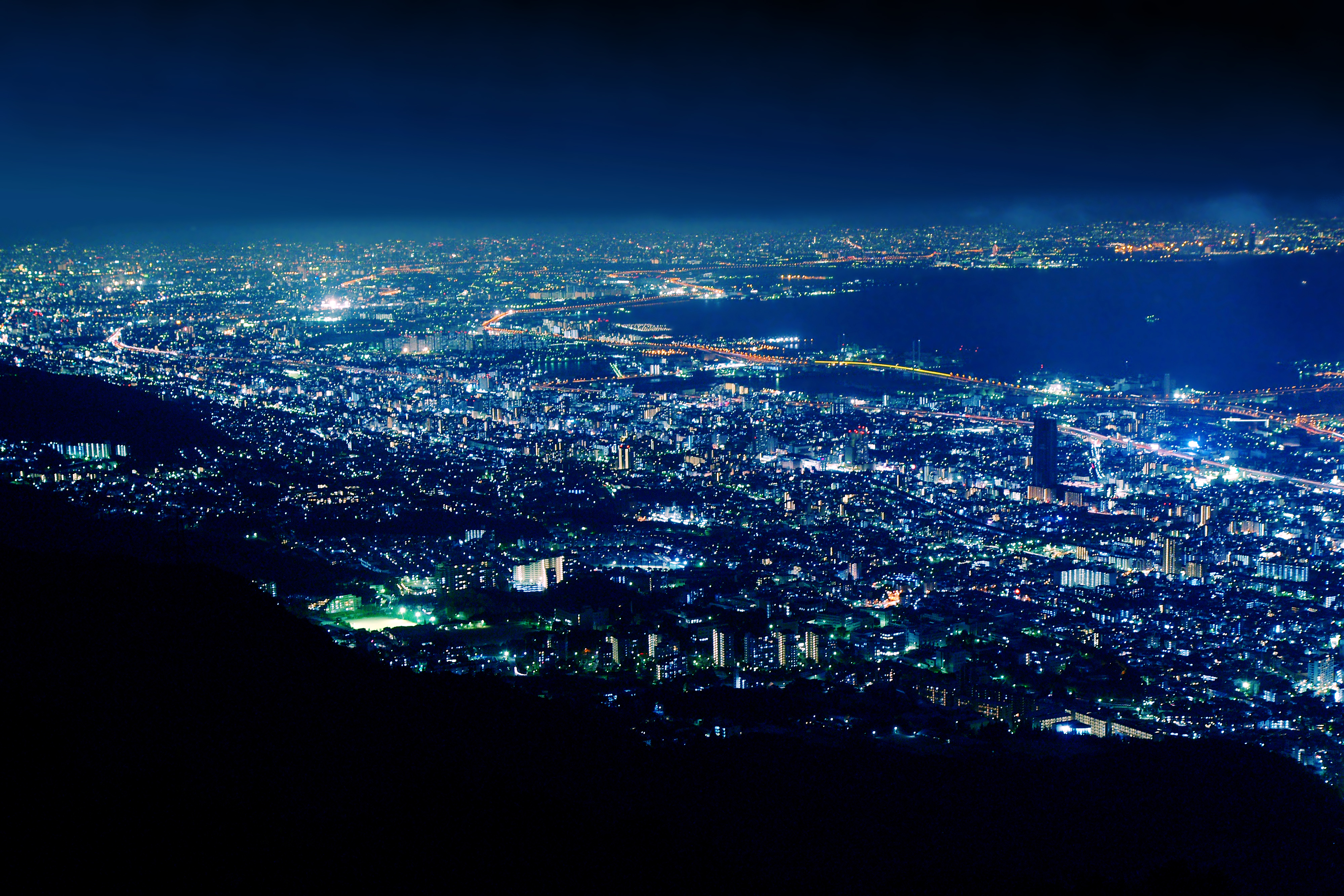
View of Osaka Bay

Kikuseidai (掬星台) is a view point and a park just aside of the top of Maya-san in Kobe, Japan. It has one of the Three Major Night Views of Japan called ten million dollar night views.

== Outline ==
Kikuseidai is located at about 700 meters above the sea level to the north of Hoshi-no-eki (星の駅), terminal station of Maya Ropeway.

It starts with a walking path decorated with fluorescent material which is supposed to remind visitors of the Milky Way.

Because of its fabulous night view of the city lights spread out before, this place is even likened to "a hill (台) where one could scoop up (掬う) a handful of star (星)," hence the name "Kikuseidai (掬星台)".

== Location ==
Mayasancho, Nada-ku, Kobe, Hyōgo Prefecture

== See also ==
- Three Major Night Views of Japan (in Japanese)
- Mayasancho (in Japanese)
