= Japanese cruiser Maya =

One of four Takao class heavy cruisers built for the Imperial Japanese Navy

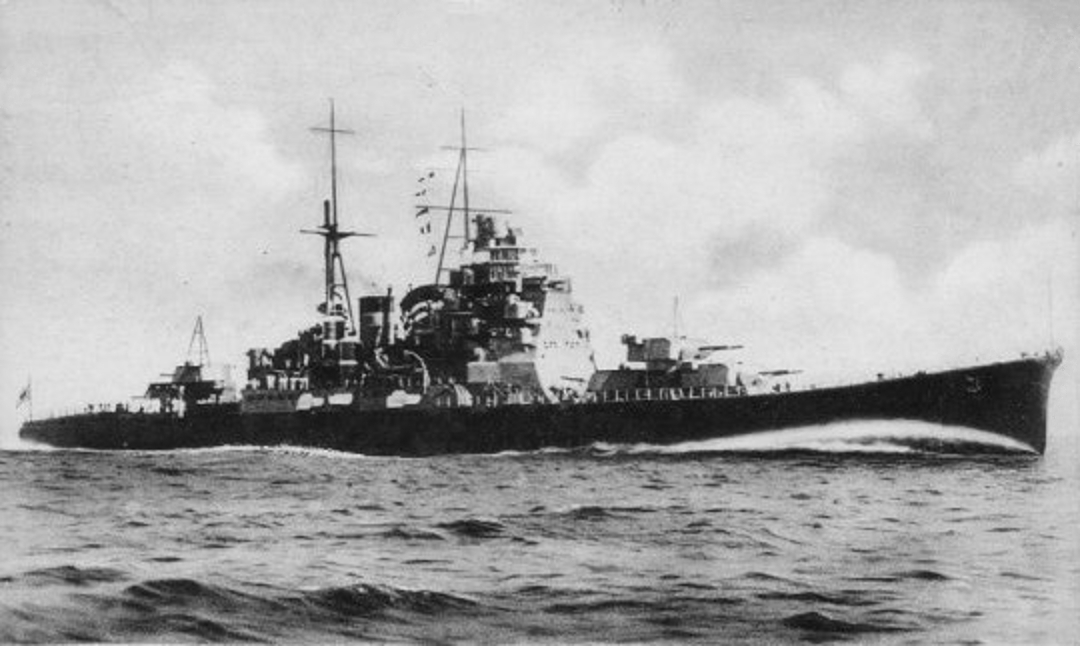
- Maya underway in the 1930s

History

Empire of Japan
- Name: Maya
- Namesake: Mount Maya
- Ordered: FY 1927
- Builder: Kawasaki Shipyards, Kobe
- Laid down: 4 December 1928
- Launched: 8 November 1930
- Commissioned: 20 June 1932
- Stricken: 20 December 1944
- Fate: Torpedoed and sunk, 23 October 1944

General characteristics
- Class & type: Takao-class cruiser
- Displacement: 9,850 t (9,690 long tons) (standard), 15,490 t (15,250 long tons) (full load)
- Length: Length between perpendiculars: 192.5 m (632 ft); overall: 203.76 m (668.5 ft)
- Beam: 19 m (62 ft) – 20.4 m (67 ft)
- Draft: 6.11 m (20.0 ft) – 6.32 m (20.7 ft)
- Propulsion: 4-shaft geared turbine, 12 Kampon boilers, 132,000 shp (98,000 kW)
- Speed: 35.5 kn (65.7 km/h; 40.9 mph)
- Range: 8,500 nautical miles (15,740 km) at 14 knots (26 km/h)
- Complement: 921–996
- Armament: Original Layout: 10× 20 cm/50 3rd Year Type naval guns (5x2); 4× 12 cm/45 10th Year Type naval guns (4x1); 2× 40 mm (1.6 in) anti-aircraft guns (2x1); Type 90 torpedoes (4x2 + 8 reloads); Final Layout: 8 × 20 cm/50 3rd Year Type naval guns (4x2); 12 × Type 89 12.7 cm (5 in) dual purpose guns, (6x2); 66 × Type 96 25 mm (1.0 in) AA guns (13x3, 27x1); 36 × Type 93 13.2 mm (0.5 in) AA machine guns; Type 93 torpedoes (4x4 + 8 reloads); depth charges
- Armour: main belt: 38 to 127 mm; main deck: 37 mm (max); upper deck: 12.7 to 25 mm; bulkheads: 76 to 100 mm; turrets: 25 mm
- Aircraft carried: 3x floatplanes (1x Aichi E13A1 "Jake" & 2x F1M2 "Pete")
- Aviation facilities: 2 aircraft catapults

Maya (摩耶) was one of four Takao-class heavy cruisers, active in World War II with the Imperial Japanese Navy (IJN). These were the largest and most modern cruisers in the Japanese fleet, and were intended to form the backbone of a multipurpose long-range strike force. These ships were fast, powerful and heavily armed, with enough firepower to hold their own against any cruiser in any other navy in the world. Her sister ships were Takao, Atago and Chōkai.

== Background ==
The Takao-class ships were approved under the 1927 to 1931 supplementary fiscal year budget, and were each named after a mountain. Mount Maya is located outside Kobe.

== Design ==
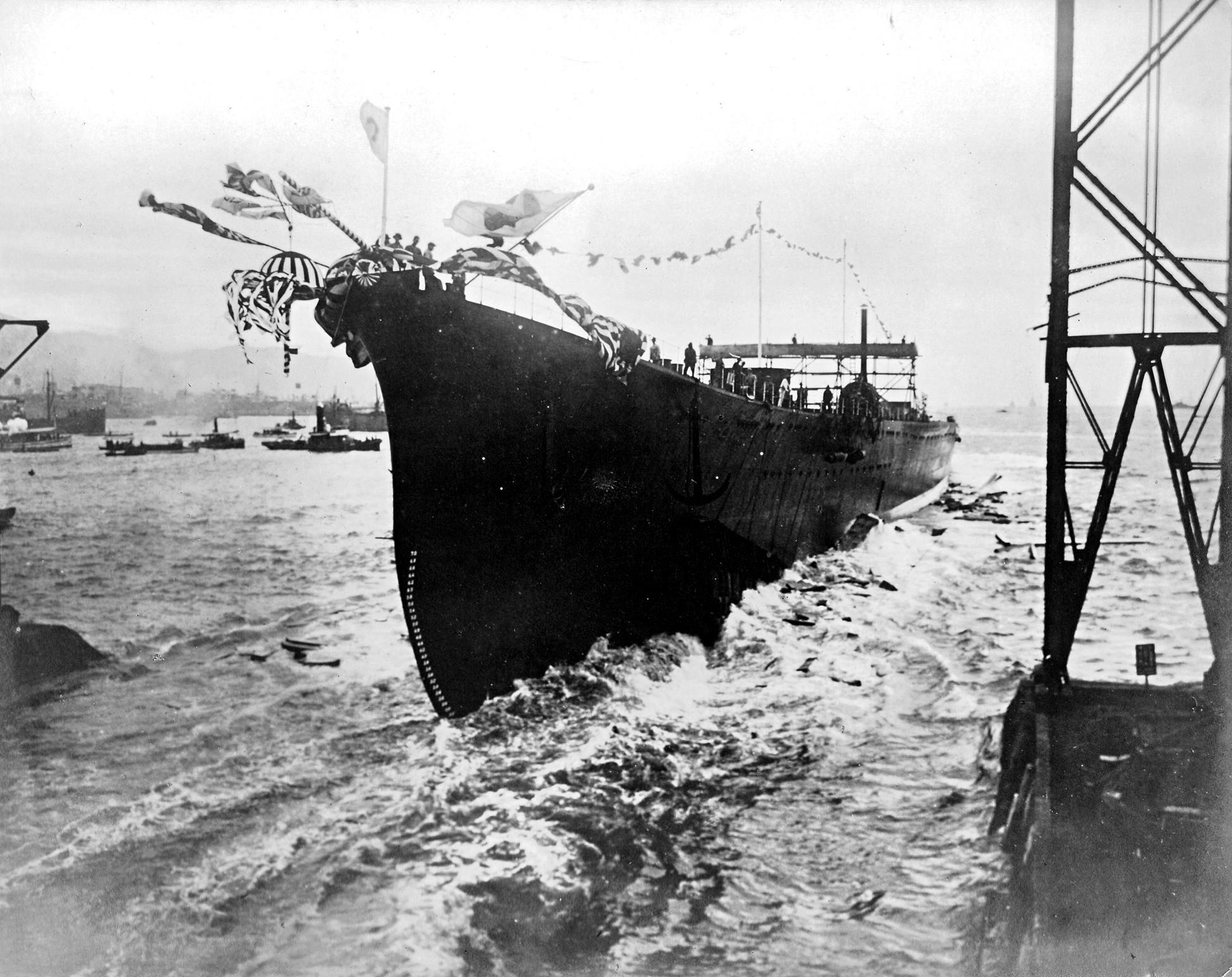
Launch of Maya, 8 November 1930

The Takao-class cruisers were an improved version of the previous Myōkō-class design, incorporating technical elements learned with the development of the experimental light cruiser Yūbari. They had a distinctive profile with a large, raked main smokestack, and a smaller, straight, second smokestack. Intended to address issues with the Myōkō class, the Takao class had thicker armor, dual-purpose main guns which could be used against aircraft, and torpedo launchers moved to the upper deck for greater safety. However, as with its predecessors, the Takao class was also top-heavy.

The Takao class displaced 16,875 t (16,608 long tons). Maya was 203.8 metres (669 ft) long, with a beam of 20.4 metres (67 ft), draft of 6.32 metres (20.7 ft) and was capable of 35.25 knots.

Propulsion was by 12 Kampon boilers driving four sets of single-impulse geared turbine engines, with four shafts turning three-bladed propellers. The ship was armored with a 127 mm (5.0 in) side belt, and 35 mm (1.4 in) armored deck;, the bridge was armored with 10 to 16 mm (0.39 to 0.63 in) armored plates.

Maya's main battery was ten 20 cm/50 3rd Year Type naval guns, the heaviest armament of any heavy cruiser in the world at the time, mounted in five twin turrets. Her secondary armament included eight Type 10 12 cm dual purpose guns with four twin mounts, two on each side, and 16 Type 90 torpedoes in four twin launchers. She was very deficient in anti-aircraft capability, with only two 40 mm (1.57 in) anti-aircraft guns. Maya was repeatedly modernized and upgraded throughout her career in order to counter the growing threat of air strikes, and in her final configuration was eight 20 cm/50 3rd Year Type naval guns (4x2), twelve Type 89 12.7 cm (5 in) dual purpose guns (6x2), and 16 Type 93 "Long Lance" torpedoes in four quadruple launchers (plus 8 reloads). Anti-aircraft (AA) protection included 13 triple-mount and 27 single-mount Type 96 25 mm AT/AA Guns (13x3, 27x1) and 36 13.2 mm (0.52 in) anti-aircraft machine guns.

== Service history ==
=== Early operations ===
Maya was laid down at the Kawasaki Shipyards in Kobe on 4 December 1928, launched and named on 8 November 1930, and was commissioned into the Imperial Japanese Navy on 30 June 1932.

All of the Takao class were assigned to the Yokosuka Naval District, forming Sentai-4 of the IJN 2nd Fleet, and trained as a unit during the 1930s. Maya was commanded by Captain Masaichi Niimi from 15 November 1932, followed by Captain Jisaburō Ozawa from 15 November 1934 to 28 October 1935. During this time, issues with their stability and seaworthiness due to the top-heavy design became evident. With the start of the Second Sino-Japanese War, she led a fleet with the Imperial Japanese Army's IJA 6th Division from Nagoya to China in August 1937. Takao and Atago were rebuilt at the Yokosuka Naval Arsenal between 1938 and 1939, resulting in an improved design: the size of the bridge was reduced, the main mast was relocated aft, and hull budges were added to improve stability. Maya and Chōkai were not modified as extensively, and can almost be considered a separate class.

=== Pacific War ===
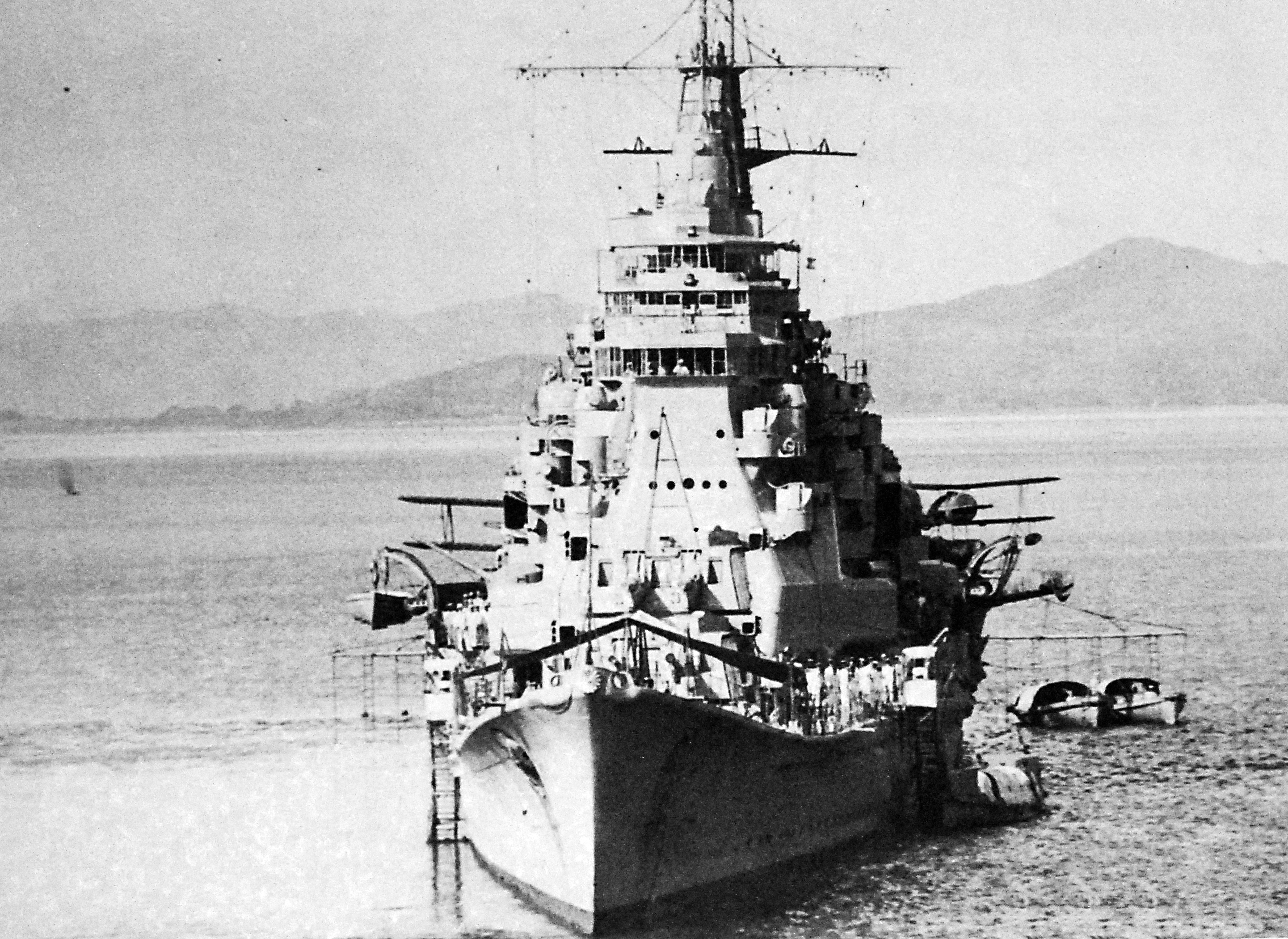
Bow view of Maya carrying Mitsubishi F1M floatplanes, 1938

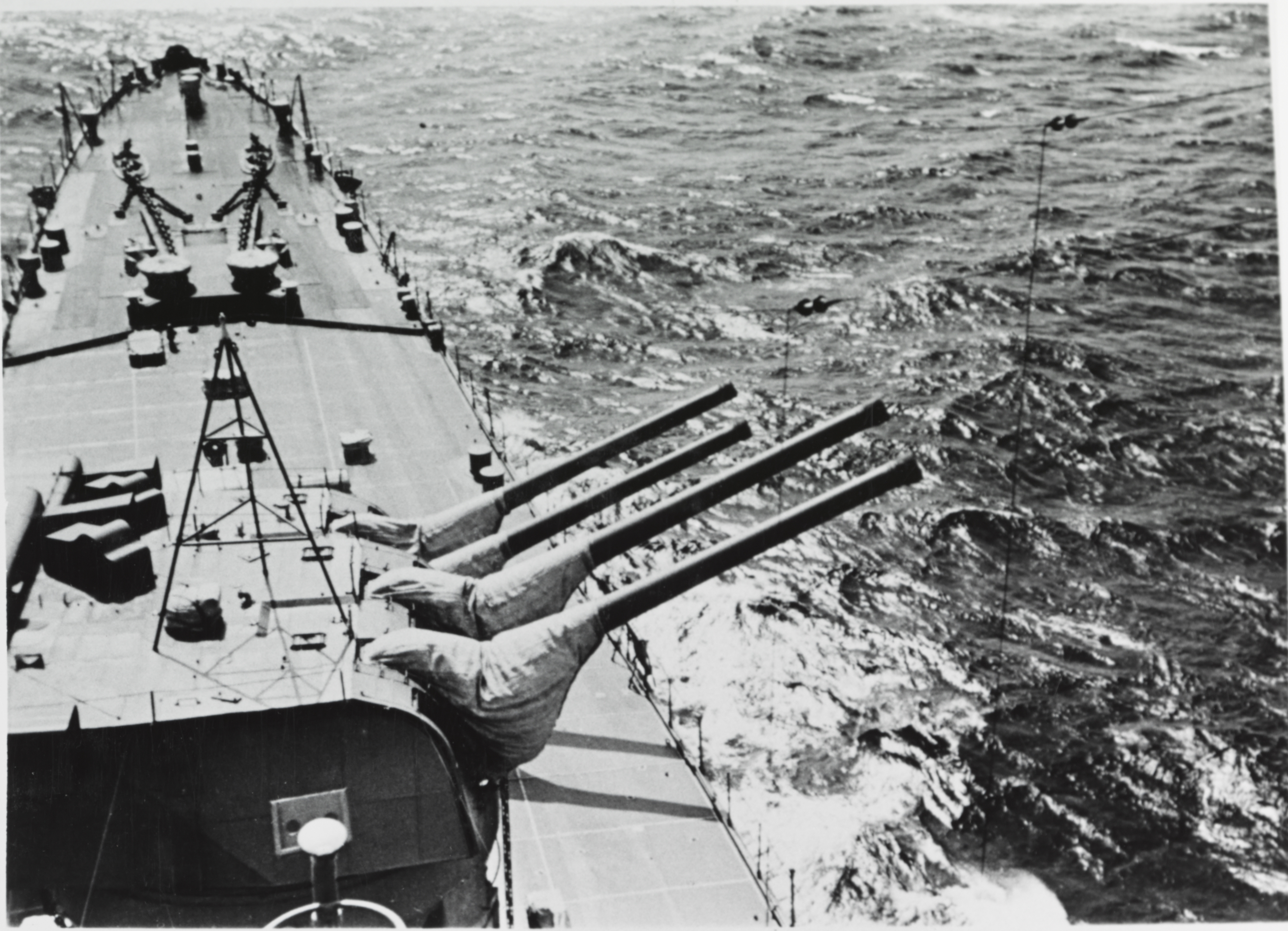
Bridge view of Maya and two of her forward double 20 cm main guns, March 1939

At the start of the Pacific War, Maya was based at Mako Guard District in the Pescadores Islands together with Atago and Takao. Atago and Takao sailed first to provide support for Japanese landings in the invasion of the northern Philippines. Maya remained at Mako in reserve until 8 December, when she sailed as part of Vice Admiral Ibō Takahashi's IJN 3rd Fleet, together with the cruisers Ashigara and Kuma to support Japanese landing at Vigan and at Lingayen Gulf. On 31 December, she provided cover for the Third Malaya Convoy, and assisted in the seizure of the Natuna islands. In January 1942, Maya was assigned to patrols from Palau, covering operations in the southern Philippines. In February, she provided distant cover for the Bombing of Darwin, Australia. From the end of February, she based at Staring-baai in the Celebes, and was involved in operations to hunt down and destroy shipping attempting to escape from the Dutch East Indies. On 2 March, Maya's floatplanes spotted HMS Stronghold, and Maya with the destroyers Arashi and Nowaki closed on the old destroyer/minelayer and expended 1270 rounds of ammunition on her before she finally sank. Survivors were picked up by captured small steamer Bintoehan, and later transferred to Maya. Later the same night, Maya and Atago also sank the destroyer USS Pillsbury. On 3 March, Maya was present at the sinking of the gunboat Asheville south of Java.

On 4 March, Atago, Takao and Maya, together attacked a convoy which had departed Tjilatjap for Fremantle, Australia, and sank the Royal Australian Navy sloop HMAS Yarra after a 90 minute battle, along with the British tanker Francol, depot ship Anking, and British minesweeper 51. Maya returned to Staring-baai on 7 March, and back to Yokosuka on 18 March. While dry-docked at Yokosuka Naval Arsenal an additional two Type 96 twin-mount AA guns were installed abreast the forward funnel.

In April 1942, Maya was part of the fleet assigned to the unsuccessful pursuit of Admiral William F. Halsey's Task Force 16.2 after the Doolittle Raid. In June 1942, Takao and Maya supported the invasion of the Aleutian Islands, protecting the convoy for Kiska and providing fire support for landings on Attu. Two reconnaissance aircraft from each cruiser were attacked by United States Army Air Forces P-40 Warhawks from Umnak on 3 June, with two destroyed and two heavily damaged on 3 June. Maya returned to Ōminato Guard District on 24 June.

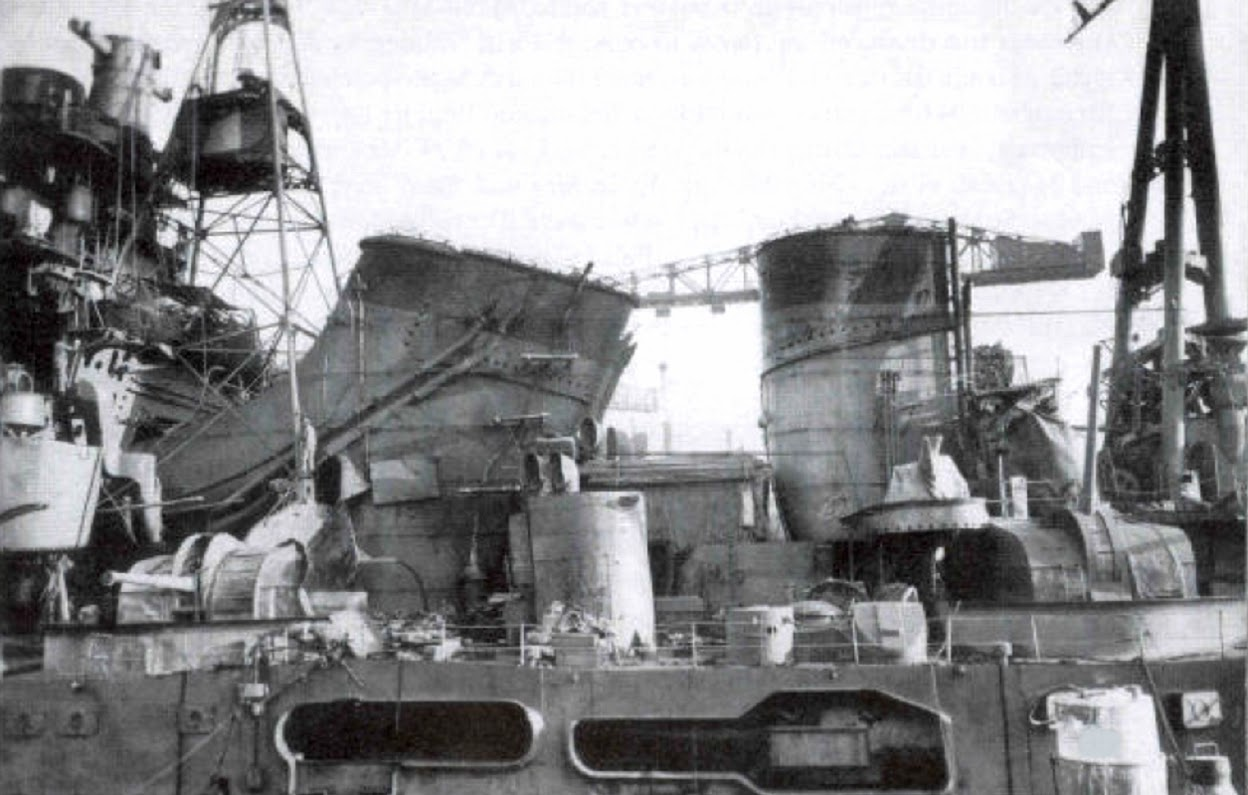
Maya in January 1943, showing damage sustained at Guadalcanal

In August 1942, Maya was assigned to "Operation Ka", the Japanese reinforcement during the Battle of Guadalcanal, departing Hashirajima with Atago and Maya on 11 August for Truk. The cruisers were in the Battle of the Eastern Solomons on 24 August from a distance, and did not see combat. On 15 October, Maya, together with Myōkō and Isuzu participated a bombardment of Henderson Field on Guadalcanal. Maya fired 450 Type-3 incendiary and Type-91 armor-piercing shells during the operation. Maya was also at the Battle of the Santa Cruz Islands participating in night combat operations resulting in the sinking of the American aircraft carrier USS Hornet. On 3 November, Maya and Chikuma were sent to reinforce the IJN 8th Fleet at Shortland Island and participated in the second bombardment of Henderson Field on 14 November. On the return from the mission, Maya's task force was attacked by the submarine USS Flying Fish, which missed the cruiser with six torpedoes. Later, a United States Navy Douglas SBD Dauntless dive bomber from VB-10 of the aircraft carrier USS Enterprise dropped a 500-pound (227 kg) bomb astern of Maya. The near miss caused no damage, but the wing of the Dauntless clipped Maya's mainmast, and the plane crashed into the port side of the cruiser, igniting 4.7-inch shells and killing 37 crewmen. Maya was forced to jettison her torpedoes as a precaution while putting out the fires, and was forced to return to Yokosuka for repairs at the end of the year. Maya returned to Yokosuka for repairs and refit in January 1943, and was then reassigned to operations in northern waters, supporting supply missions to the Kurile Islands and the Aleutian Islands.

==== Battle of the Komandorski Islands ====
Main Article: Battle of the Komandorski Islands

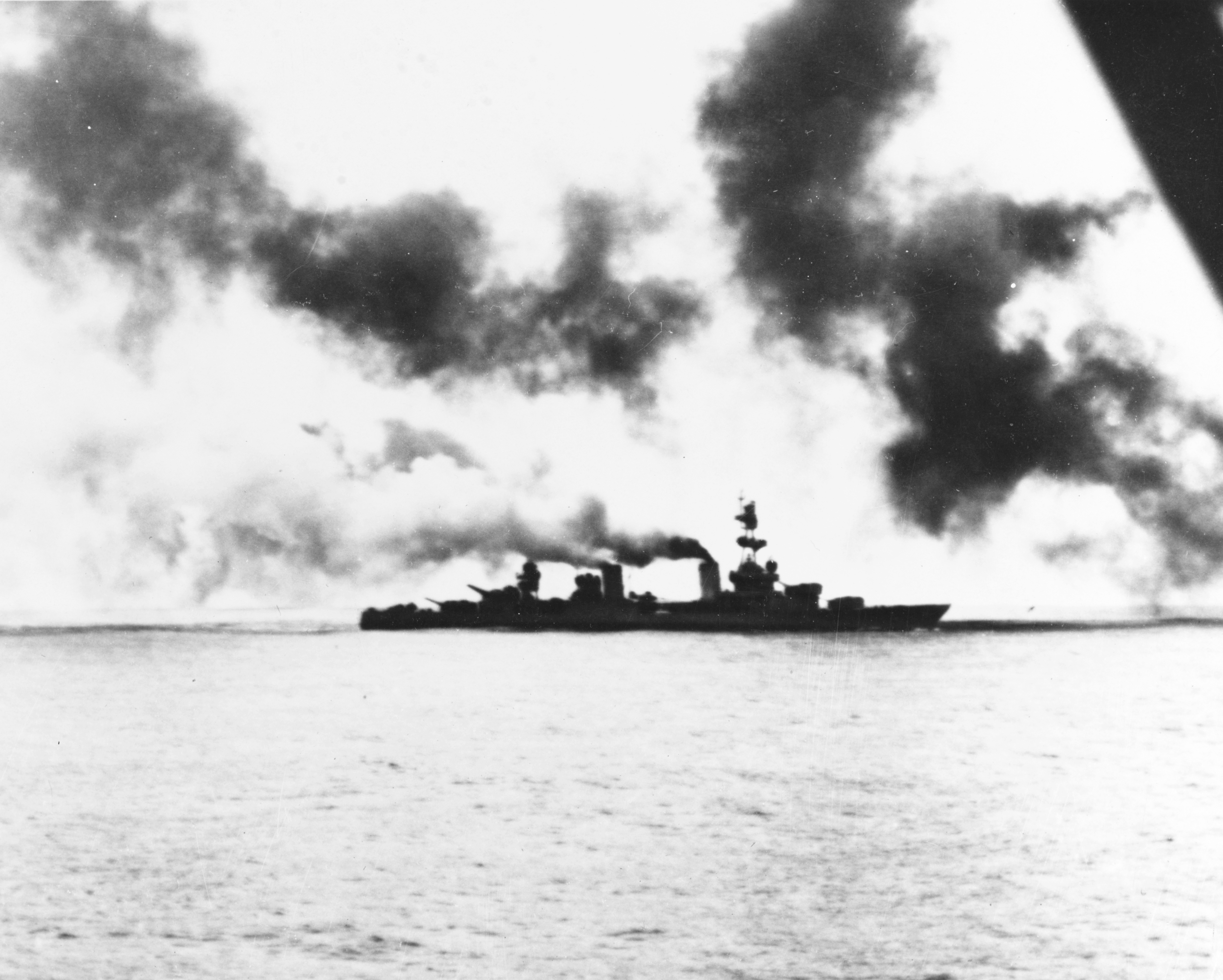
USS Salt Lake City going dead in the water after heavy gunfire damage inflicted by Maya at the battle of the Komandorski Islands

On March 23, Maya departed Paramushiro alongside the heavy cruiser Nachi, the light cruisers Abukuma and Tama, and five destroyers to support a troop convoy destined to the Attu Islands. American intelligence intercepted plans for the mission (albeit underestimating the convoy's escort), prompting a squadron of the heavy cruiser USS Salt Lake City, the light cruiser USS Richmond, and four destroyers to sail out in hopes of engaging the Japanese ships. In the early daylight of the 27th, Maya was intercepted by the US ships, but was untargeted, with both of the US cruisers focusing their gunfire at Nachi from a distance of 21,000 yards. Nachi's return fire was ineffective, but Salt Lake City and Richmond managed to gouge Nachi with five shells, setting her on fire.

Maya unleashed a spread of four Type 93 torpedoes at the enemy, but none hit their mark. However, the same could not be said for Maya's gunfire, which engaged in a duel with Salt Lake City. During the exchange of fire, Maya was lightly damaged by a few straddles and near misses, killing one man, but was not directly hit, and in turn inflicted far more damage than she received and, despite the long range of 21,000 yards, immediately began to score hits on Salt Lake City, the first of which was an 8-inch (203 mm) projectile which set her starboard spotting plane on fire, killing 2 men. Another direct hit from Maya flooded the cruiser's forward compartments, and several more snuffed out Salt Lake City's boiler fires one by one, causing the cruiser to slowly loose speed. After being hit by seven 8-inch (203 mm) shells from Maya, Salt Lake City finally went dead in the water with a rudder jam, prompting escorting destroyers to cover her with a smokescreen. Simultaneously, Nachi fired on American destroyers attempting a torpedo charge, and crippled the destroyer USS Bailey with four 8-inch (203 mm) shell hits and damaged the destroyer USS Coghlan with one.

Completely out of AP shells, the American cruisers were forced to fire HE shells at the enemy. However, the larger water columns caused by the HE shells, mixed with intercepted transmissions between US intelligence caused the Japanese command to believe they were under air attacks, resulting in the Japanese ships retreating, and for the troop convoy to be called off, ultimately ending the battle in a US victory. After repairs again at Yokosuka, Maya returned to the Kuriles in late April, and became flagship of the IJN Fifth Fleet, assisting in the evacuation of Kiska after the loss of Attu to the Americans in August 1943.

==== Bombing of Rabaul and retrofit ====
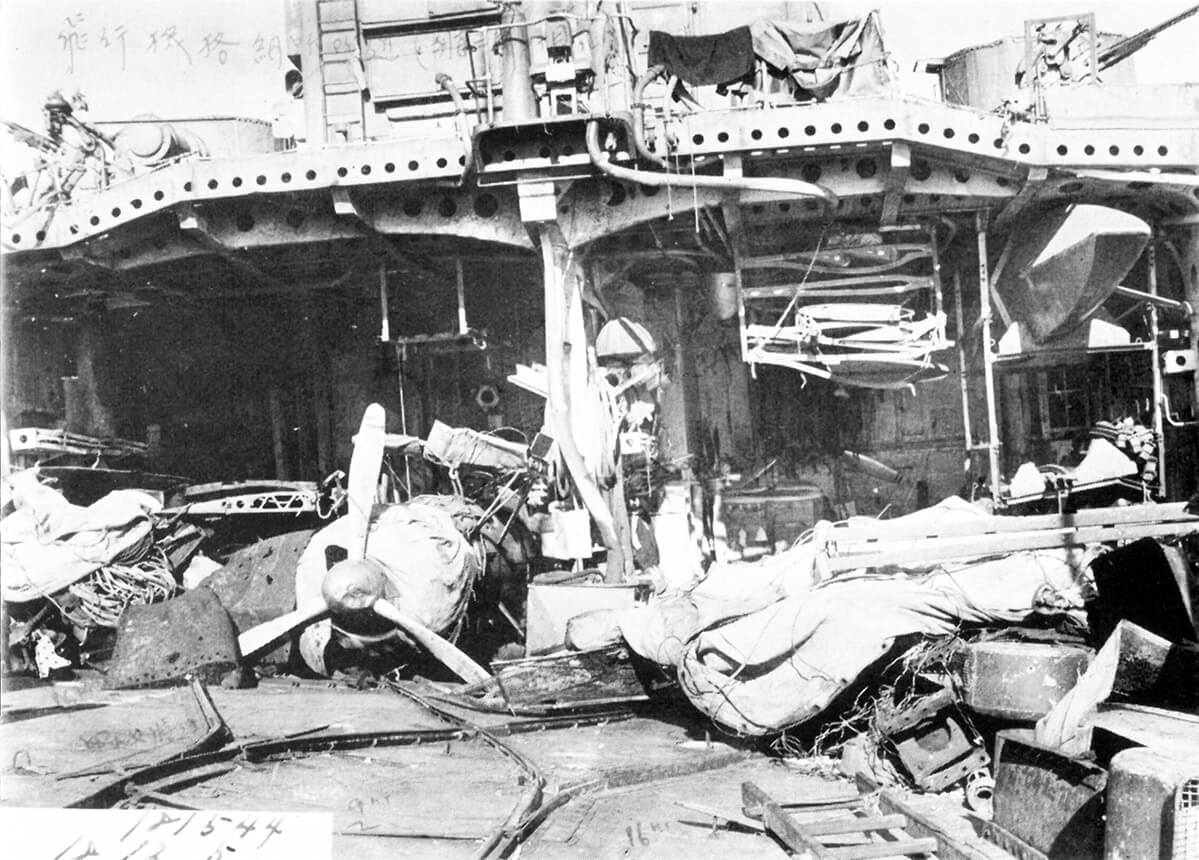
Bomb damage to Maya sustained at Rabaul, aircraft deck portside above the No. 3 engine room, 5 December 1943

After refit in Yokosuka during which two additional twin-mount Type-96 AA guns (bringing its total to 16 barrels), Maya accompanied Chōkai back to Truk, arriving in late September, and started shuttling troops and supplies between Truk and Rabaul. ON 5 November, Maya was attacked by SBD Dauntless dive bombers from the carrier USS Saratoga during the Carrier Raid on Rabaul. A bomb hit the aircraft deck portside above the No. 3 engine room and started a major fire. Seventy crewmen were killed. Emergency repairs were made at Rabaul, and Maya returned to Yokosuka at the end of 1943. During this repair, a major change was made in Maya's armaments, transforming her into an anti-aircraft cruiser, with her No.3 turret and aircraft hangar removed, and replaced by thirteen triple mount and nine single mount Type 96 AA guns, and six twin-mount 127-mm guns, as well as 36 Type 93 machine guns. Her twin torpedo launchers were upgraded to quadruple launchers, and a Type 22 surface-search radar was installed. The overhaul was completed on 9 April.

At Kure, Maya embarked two Aichi E13A1 "Jake" long-range scout planes, troops and materials. A monkey, donated to Maya by the Kure Zoo, was also embarked. During the voyage, the aircrew taught the monkey to salute the officers, much to their annoyance.

==== Battle of the Philippine Sea ====
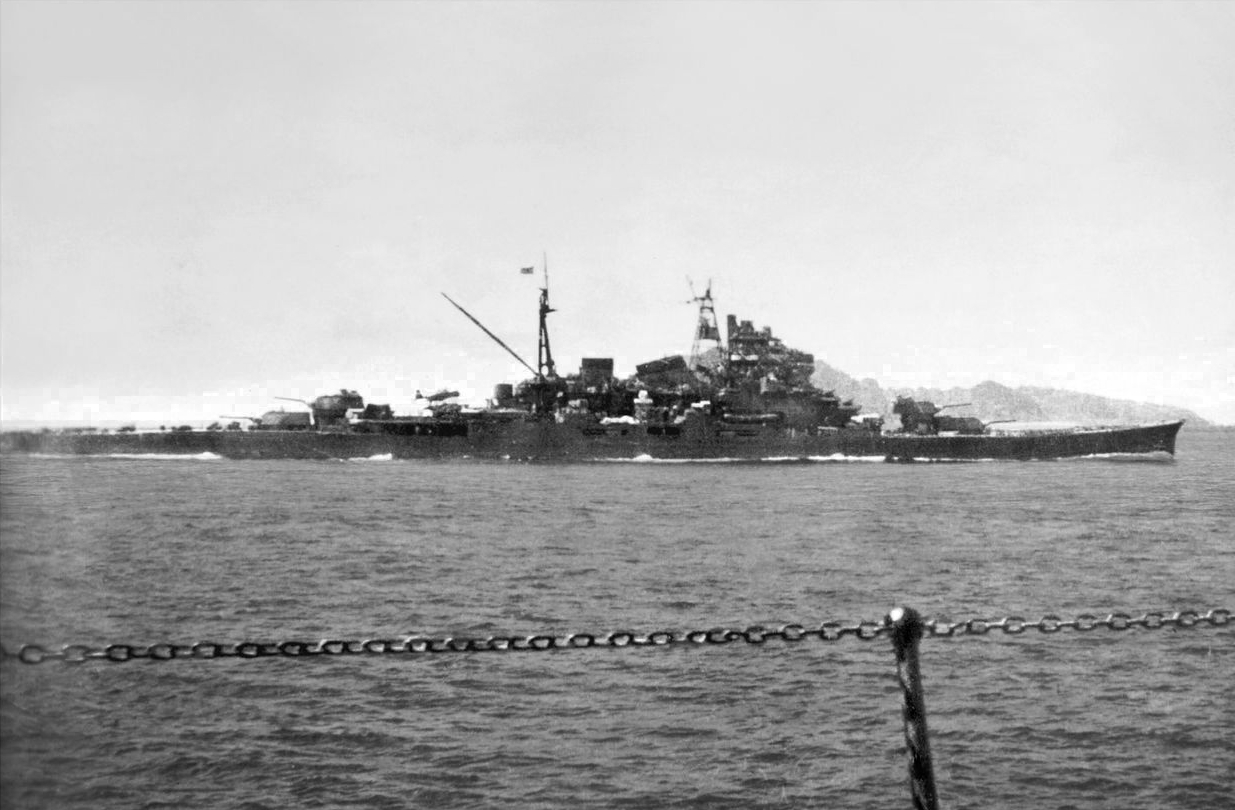
Maya off Tawi-Tawi, the Philippines, May 1944

From April to June 1944, Maya supported other units in the defense of the Philippines, culminating in the Battle of the Philippine Sea, in which she was damaged slightly by near-misses. During this battle, on 20 June, the scout plane from Maya spotted Task Force 58 at a distance of 300 miles (480 km). Maya went into a ring formation with the battleships Kongō, Haruna, destroyer Asashimo and other escorts to protect the aircraft carrier Chiyoda. This formation was attacked by over 50 TBF Avenger torpedo bombers from the aircraft carriers USS Bunker Hill, Monterey, and Cabot.

On 20 June, Maya retired with the remnants of the fleet via Okinawa to Yokosuka, arriving 25 June where the aircrew and their pet monkey disembarked and an additional 18 Type 96 single-mount AA guns were installed. On 14 July, Maya transported units of the IJA 28th Division to Miyako-jima from Kure, and then continued on to Singapore. She rendezvoused with the fleet at Brunei on 20 October.

==== Battle of Leyte Gulf ====
On 22 October, in the Battle of Leyte Gulf, Maya was assigned to Sentai-4 with sister ships Atago, Takao and Chōkai together with the battleships Yamato, Musashi and Nagato. At 05:33 on 23 October, the fleet was attacked in the Palawan Passage by a pair of US submarines, Maya's sister-ships Atago and Takao were torpedoed by the submarine USS Darter. Atago was hit four times and sank in approximately 18 minutes, while Takao was severely damaged by two hits and forced to retire to Singapore. Twenty minutes later, submarine USS Dace fired six torpedoes at Maya, mistaking it for a Kongō-class battlecruiser; Maya was struck by four torpedoes portside: one in the forward chain locker, another opposite No. 1 gun turret, a third in No. 7 boiler room and the last in the aft engine room. Powerful secondary explosions followed immediately, and by 06:00 Maya was dead in the water and listing heavily to port. She sank five minutes later, taking 336 officers and men to the bottom, including her captain (09°27′N 117°23′E).

Akishimo rescued 769 men, and transferred them to the battleship Musashi, which was sunk the following day; 143 of Maya's crewmen were lost with Musashi. Thus, from the final crew of 1,105 crewmen, 479 were lost. She was removed from the navy list on 20 December 1944.

== Wreck ==
On 19 April 2019, researchers aboard RV Petrel announced they had located the wreck of Maya in around 1,850 m (6,070 ft) of water. She sits upright with the tip of the bow broken off and lying upside down off the port quarter of the remainder of the wreck. She is in astonishingly good condition, with all main gun turrets still in place, and the massive bridge structure intact. Although her sister ship Atago was also sunk nearby, the bridge structure and main gun layout confirm that the wreck is indeed Maya.

== Maya in popular culture ==
In the 1988 Studio Ghibli film Grave of the Fireflies, the father of Setsuko and Seita serves onboard Maya. He is assumed to have been killed in the end of the film.

Maya appears as a character in the 2013 anime Arpeggio of Blue Steel: Ars Nova, produced by Studio Sanzigen and airing from October to December 2013. In the series Maya is depicted as a childish and lively Mental Model, acting as an observation unit within the Fleet of Fog.

Maya was added to World of Warships as a Tier VII Premium Japanese Heavy Cruiser.
