= Rokko Cable Line =

Funicular line in Kobe, Hyōgo, Japan

Coordinates: 34°45′6.3″N 135°14′12.9″E

Rokkō Cable Line
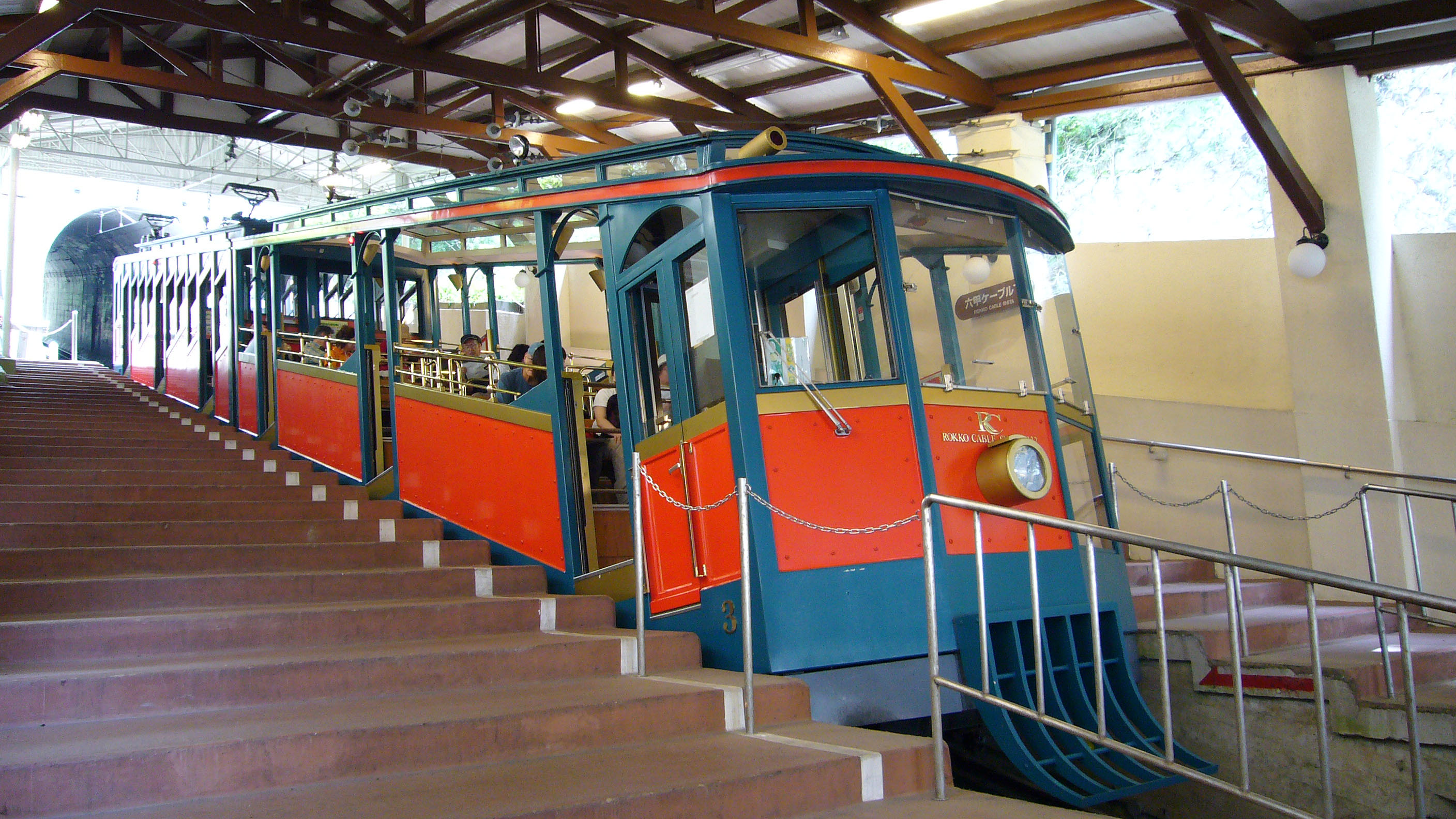
- Rokkō Cable funicular in 2006

Overview
- Native name: 六甲ケーブル線
- Locale: Mount Rokkō, Kobe, Hyōgo, Japan
- Stations: 2

Service
- Type: funicular railway

History
- Opened: 1932

Technical
- Track length: 1.7 km (1.1 mi)
- Number of tracks: Single-track with passing loop
- Track gauge: 1,067 mm (3 ft 6 in)

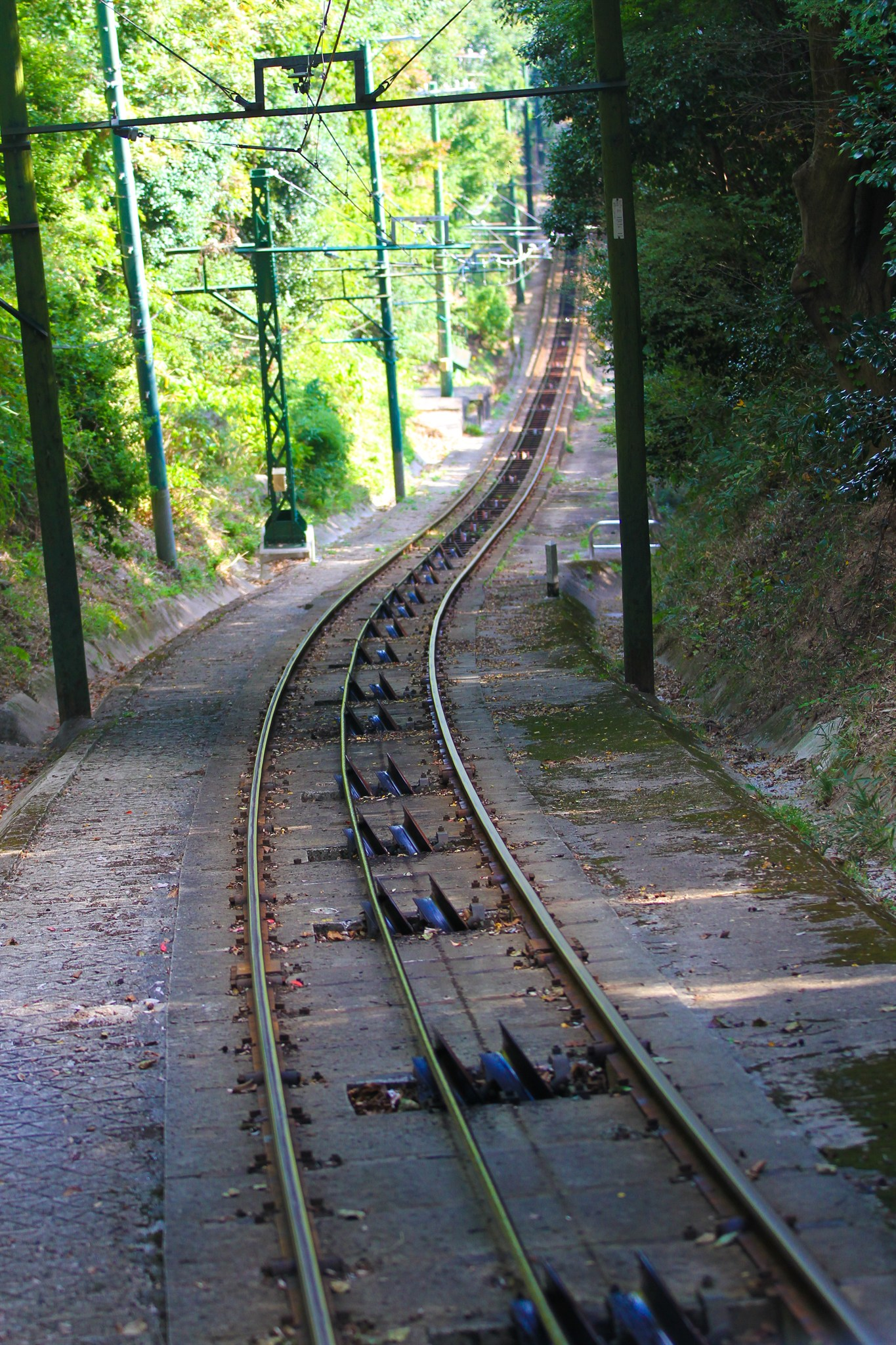
Rokkō Cable Line tracks

Night view from the upper station of Rokkō Cable Line

The Rokkō Cable Line (六甲ケーブル線, Rokkō Kēburu-sen) is a funicular line on Mount Rokkō in Kobe, Hyōgo, Japan. It is the only railway line Kobe Rokko Railway (神戸六甲鉄道, Kōbe Rokkō Tetsudō) operates, while it also operates bus lines. The line opened in 1932.

The line's two stations differ in elevation by 493 m (1,617 ft).

== See also ==
- List of funicular railways
- List of railway companies in Japan
- List of railway lines in Japan
- Maya Cablecar
- Maya Ropeway
- Rokkō Arima Ropeway
- Shin-Kōbe Ropeway
