= Kobe Nunobiki Ropeway =

Coordinates: 34°43′2″N 135°11′28″E

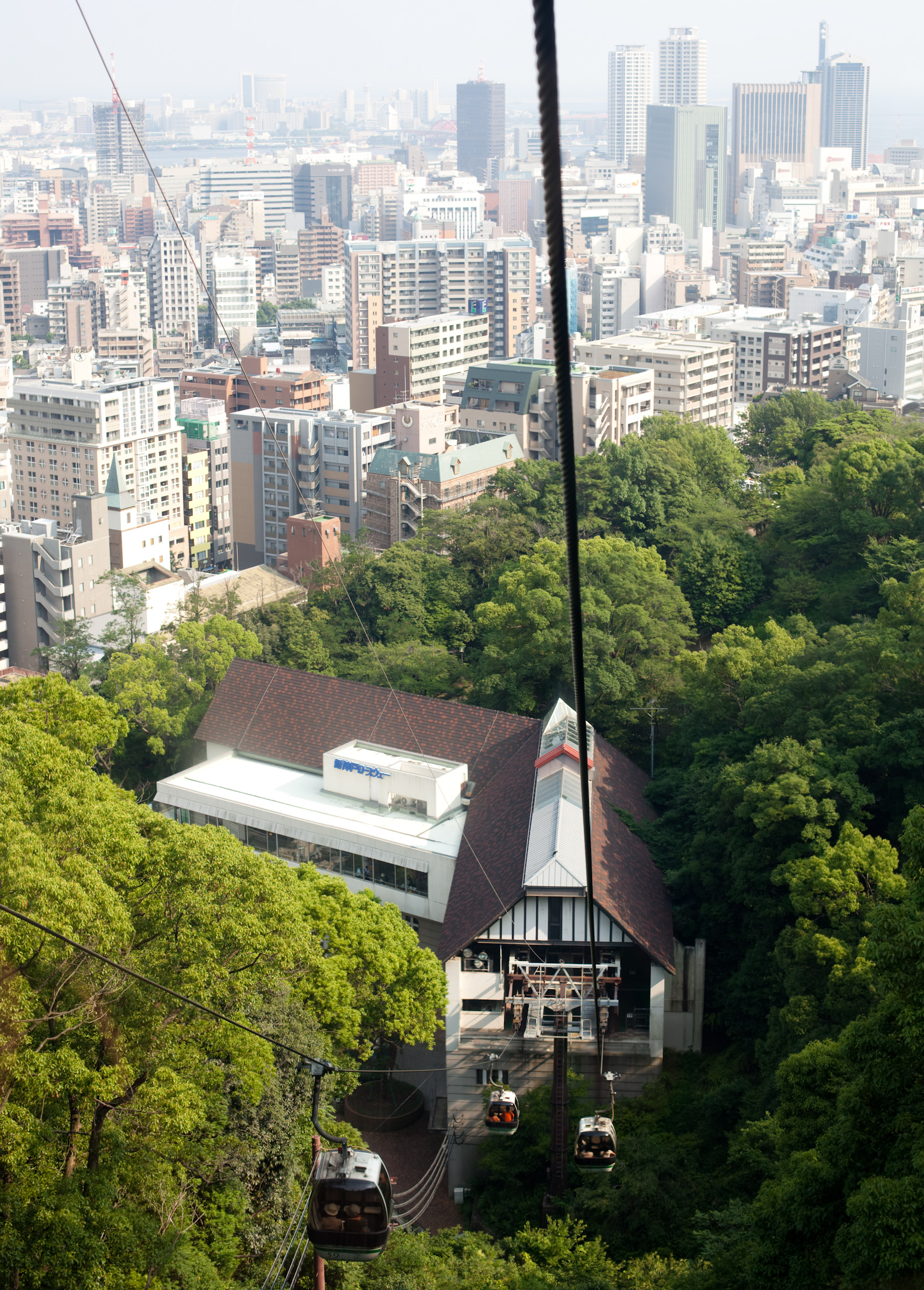
Kobe Nunobiki Ropeway

The Kobe Nunobiki Ropeway (神戸布引ロープウェイ, Kōbe Nunobiki Rōpuwē) is an Cable Car line in Kōbe, Hyōgo, Japan, operated by Kōbe City Urban Development. Opened in 1991, the line links Shin-Kōbe Station and Nunobiki Herb Garden. Its scenic view is popular among tourists.

== Basic data ==
- Cable length: 1.5 kilometres (0.9 mi)
- Vertical interval: 330 m (1,083 ft)
- Longest span: 217 m (712 ft)
- Spans: 12
- Passenger capacity per a cabin: 6
- Cabins: 69
- Main engine: 200 kW DC motor
- Operational speed: 3 m/s
- Time required for single ride: 10 minutes

== See also ==
- Maya Ropeway
- Rokkō Arima Ropeway
- Maya Cablecar
- Rokkō Cable Line
- List of aerial lifts in Japan
