= Makishi Station =

Monorail station in Naha, Okinawa Prefecture, Japan

Coordinates: 26.2172°N 127.6930°E

Makishi Station 牧志駅
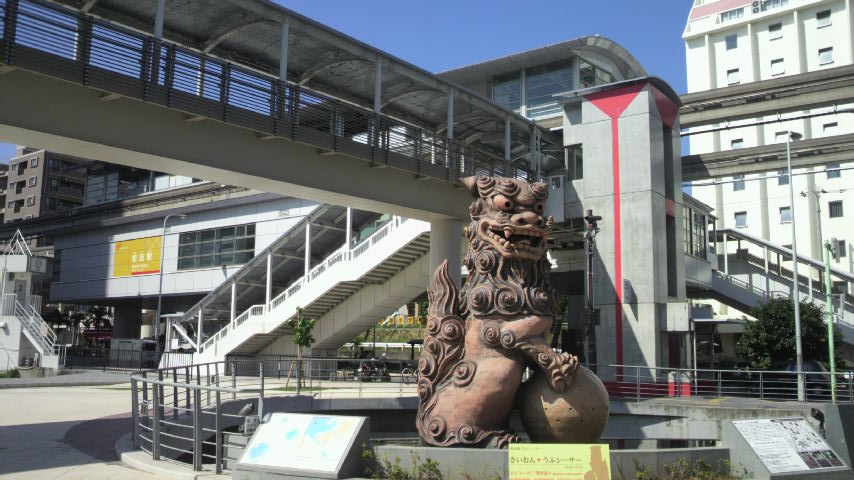

General information
- Location: Naha, Okinawa; Japan
- Operator: Okinawa Urban Monorail
- Line: ■ Okinawa Urban Monorail Line

Construction
- Structure type: Elevated
- Accessible: Yes

Other information
- Station code: 9

History
- Opened: August 2003

Services
Preceding station	Okinawa Urban Monorail	Following station
Miebashi towards Naha Airport	Yui Rail	Asato towards Tedako-Uranishi
Location

Makishi Station (牧志駅, Makishi-eki) is a railway station on the Okinawa Urban Monorail (known colloquially as Yui Rail) located in Naha, Okinawa Prefecture, Japan.

== Lines ==
- Okinawa Urban Monorail

== Layout ==
The station consists of one elevated island platform serving two tracks.

=== Platforms ===
1	■ Okinawa Urban Monorail	for Tedako-Uranishi
2	■ Okinawa Urban Monorail	for Naha Airport

== History ==
Makishi Station opened in August 2003.
