= Asato Station =

Monorail station in Naha, Okinawa Prefecture, Japan

Coordinates: 26.2167°N 127.6960°E

Asato Station 安里駅
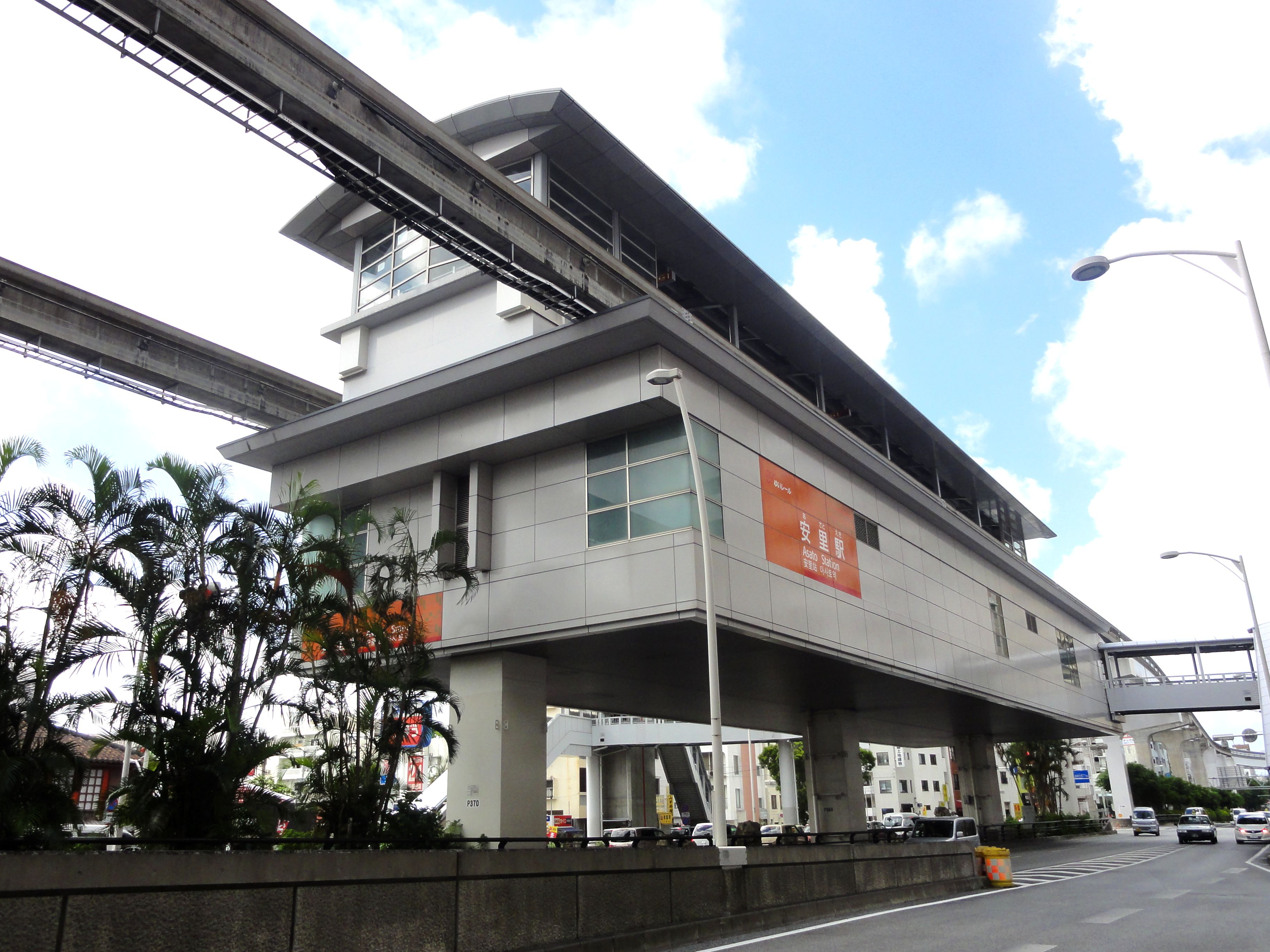

General information
- Location: Naha, Okinawa; Japan
- Operator: Okinawa Urban Monorail
- Line: ■ Okinawa Urban Monorail Line

Construction
- Structure type: Elevated
- Accessible: Yes

Other information
- Station code: 10

History
- Opened: August 2003

Services
Preceding station	Okinawa Urban Monorail	Following station
Makishi towards Naha Airport	Yui Rail	Omoromachi towards Tedako-Uranishi
Location

Asato Station (安里駅, Asato-eki) is a railway station on the Okinawa Urban Monorail (Yui Rail) line located in Naha, Okinawa Prefecture, Japan.

== Lines ==
- Okinawa Urban Monorail

== Layout ==
The station consists of one elevated island platform serving two tracks.

=== Platforms ===
1	■ Okinawa Urban Monorail	for Tedako-Uranishi
2	■ Okinawa Urban Monorail	for Naha Airport

== History ==
Asato Station opened in August 2003.
