= Kyozuka Station =

Monorail station in Urasoe, Okinawa Prefecture, Japan

Coordinates: 26.2367°N 127.7285°E

Kyozuka Station 経塚駅
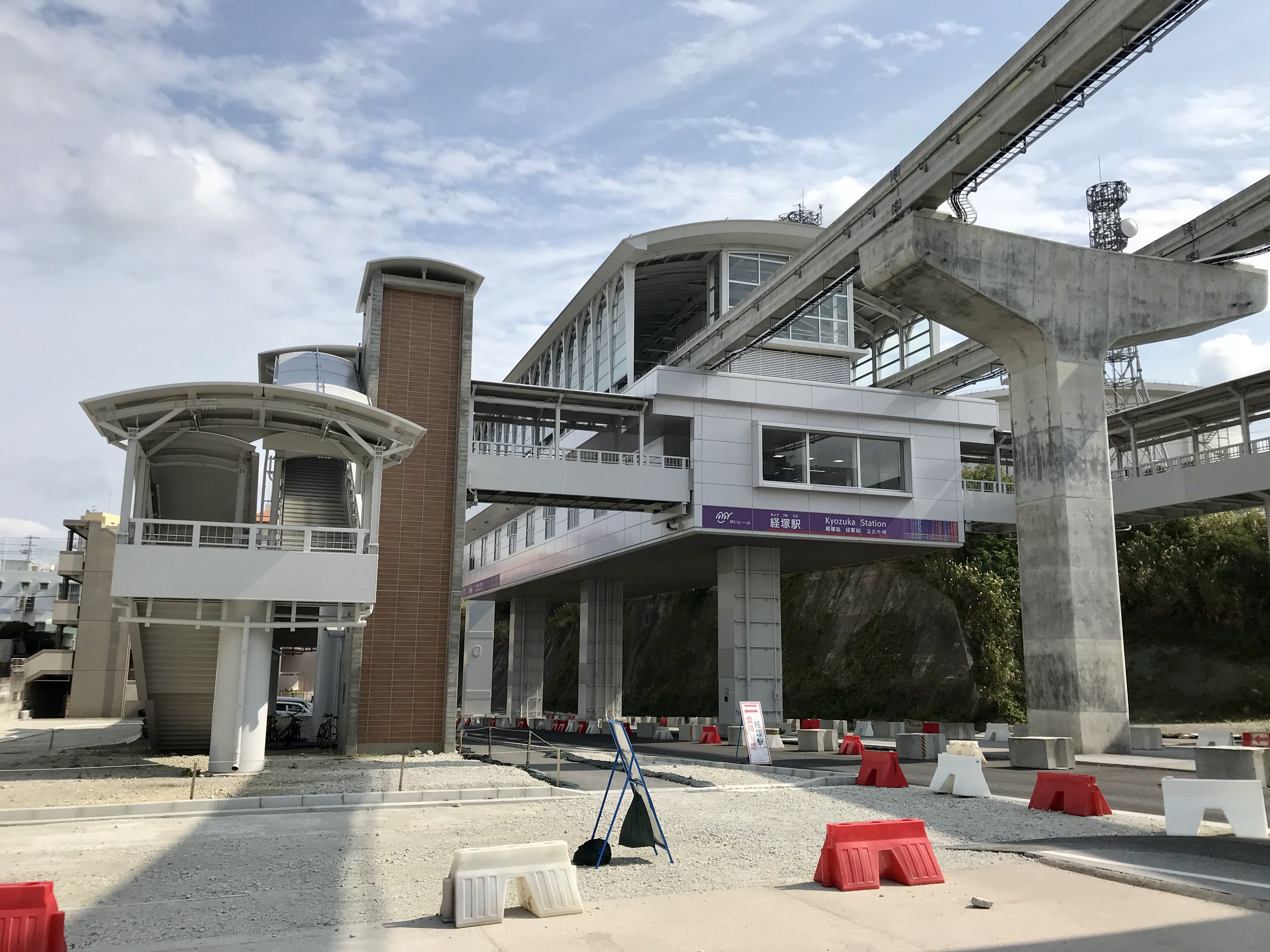
- Kyozuka Station in February 2020

General information
- Location: Urasoe, Okinawa; Japan
- Operator: Okinawa Urban Monorail
- Line: ■ Okinawa Urban Monorail Line
- Tracks: 2

Construction
- Structure type: Elevated
- Accessible: yes

Other information
- Station code: 17

History
- Opened: October 1, 2019

Services
Preceding station	Okinawa Urban Monorail	Following station
Ishimine towards Naha Airport	Yui Rail	Urasoe-Maeda towards Tedako-Uranishi
Location

Kyozuka Station (経塚駅, Kyōzuka-eki) is a railway station on the Okinawa Urban Monorail (Yui Rail) in Urasoe, Okinawa Prefecture, Japan.The monorail line spans approximately 17 kilometers, connecting Naha Airport Station to Tedako-Uranishi Station.

== Lines ==
- Okinawa Urban Monorail

== Layout ==
The station consists of one elevated island platform serving two tracks.

=== Platforms ===
1	■ Okinawa Urban Monorail	for Tedako-Uranishi
2	■ Okinawa Urban Monorail	for Naha Airport

== History ==
The station opened on October 1, 2019, as part of the new extension from Shuri to Tedako-Uranishi.
