= Gibo Station =

Monorail station in Naha, Okinawa Prefecture, Japan

Coordinates: 26.2246°N 127.7190°E

Gibo Station 儀保駅
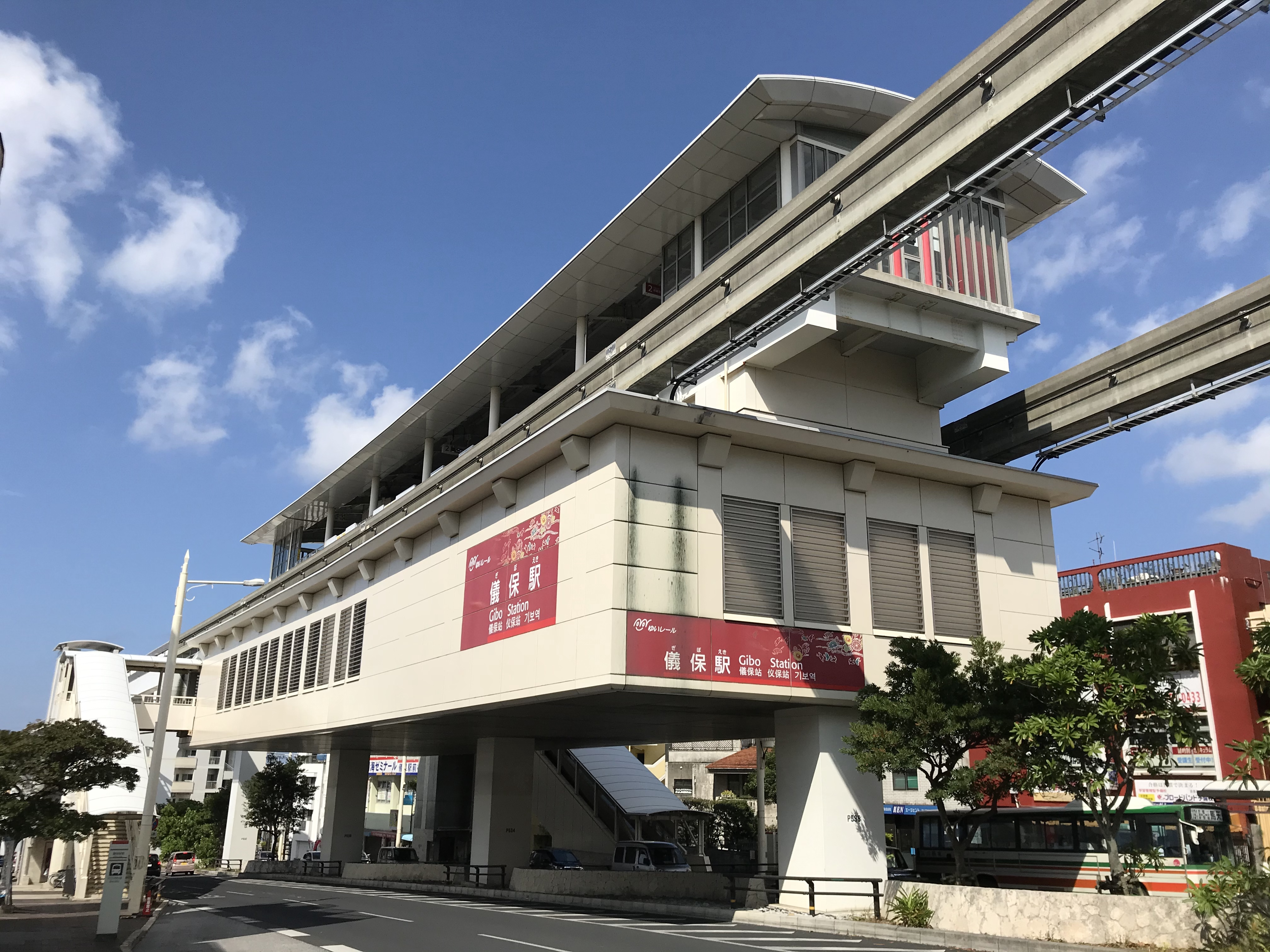
- Gibo Station building in February 2020

General information
- Location: Naha, Okinawa; Japan
- Operator: Okinawa Urban Monorail
- Line: ■ Okinawa Urban Monorail Line
- Tracks: 2

Construction
- Structure type: Elevated
- Accessible: Yes

Other information
- Station code: 14

History
- Opened: 10 August 2003

Services
Preceding station	Okinawa Urban Monorail	Following station
Naha City Hospital towards Naha Airport	Yui Rail	Shuri towards Tedako-Uranishi
Location

Gibo Station (儀保駅, Gibo-eki) is a railway station on the Okinawa Urban Monorail (Yui Rail) in Naha, Okinawa Prefecture, Japan.

== Lines ==
- Okinawa Urban Monorail

== Layout ==
The station consists of one elevated island platform serving two tracks.

=== Platforms ===
1	■ Okinawa Urban Monorail	for Tedako-Uranishi
2	■ Okinawa Urban Monorail	for Naha Airport

== History ==
The station opened on 10 August 2003.
