= Naha City Hospital Station =

Monorail station in Naha, Okinawa Prefecture, Japan

Coordinates: 26.2275°N 127.7100°E

Naha City Hospital Station 市立病院前駅
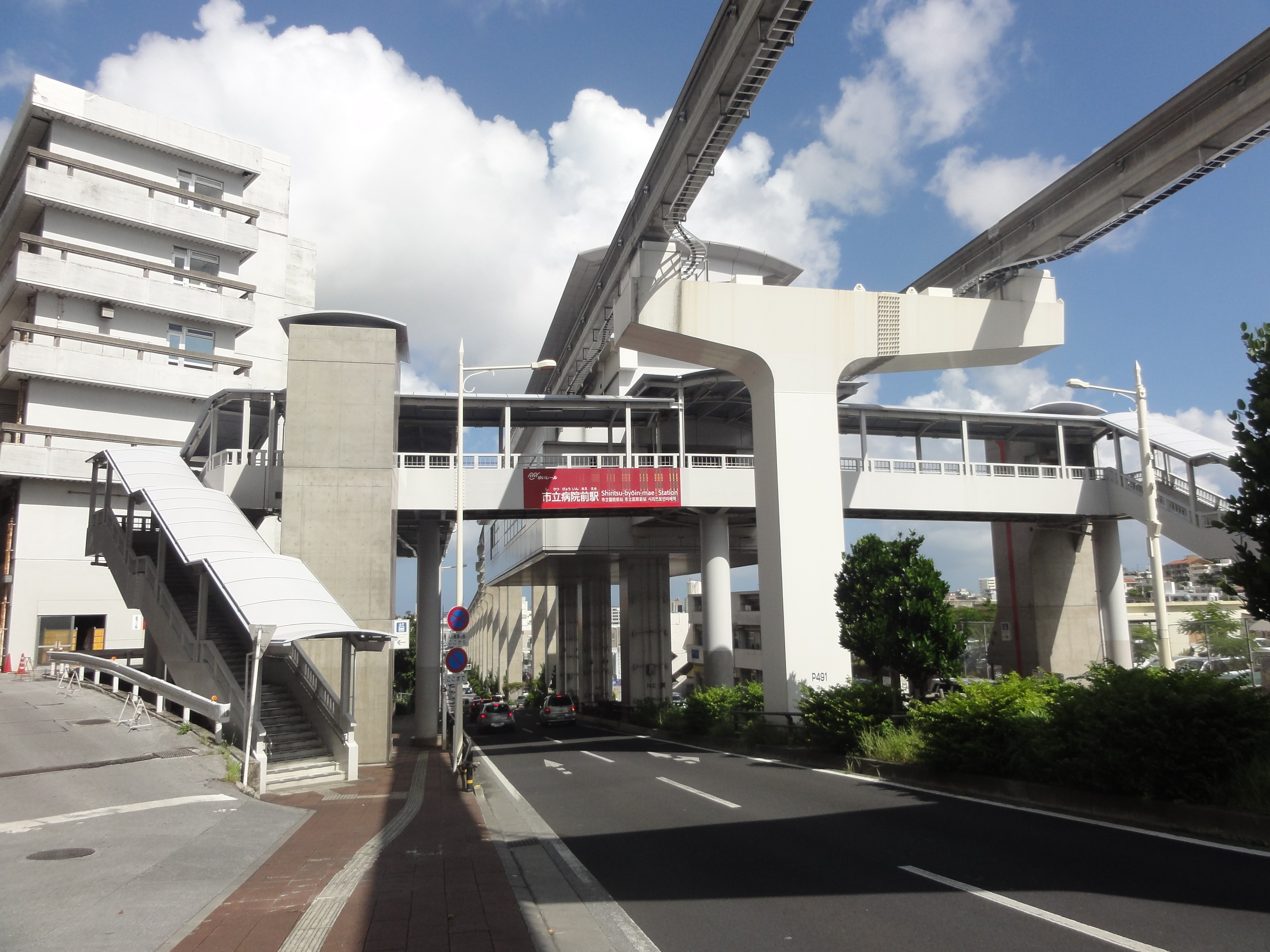

General information
- Location: Naha, Okinawa; Japan
- Operator: Okinawa Urban Monorail
- Line: ■ Okinawa Urban Monorail Line
- Tracks: 2

Construction
- Structure type: Elevated
- Accessible: Yes

Other information
- Station code: 13

History
- Opened: August 2003

Services
Preceding station	Okinawa Urban Monorail	Following station
Furujima towards Naha Airport	Yui Rail	Gibo towards Tedako-Uranishi
Location

Naha City Hospital Station (市立病院前駅, Shiritsu-byōin-mae-eki) is a railway station on the Okinawa Urban Monorail (Yui Rail) in Naha, Okinawa Prefecture, Japan.

== Lines ==
- Okinawa Urban Monorail

== Layout ==
The station consists of one elevated island platform serving two tracks.

=== Platforms ===
1	■ Okinawa Urban Monorail	for Tedako-Uranishi
2	■ Okinawa Urban Monorail	for Naha Airport

== History ==
Naha City Hospital opened for service in August 2003.
