= Omoromachi Station =

Monorail station in Naha, Okinawa Prefecture, Japan

Coordinates: 26.222715°N 127.698469°E

Omoromachi Station おもろまち駅
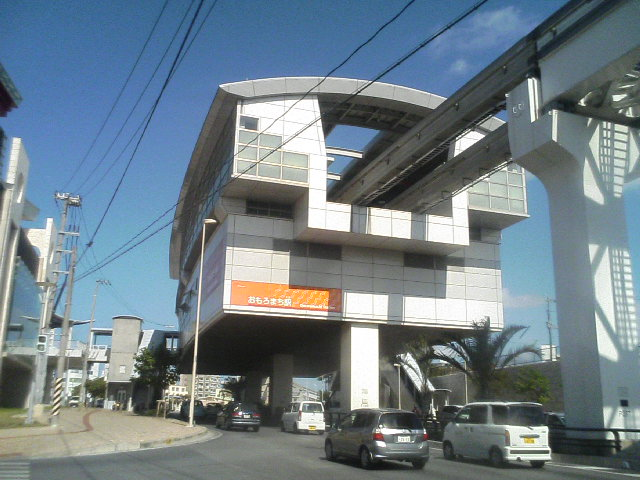
- Omoromachi Station as seen from the street below.

General information
- Location: Omoromachi 4 chōme, Naha, Okinawa （那覇市おもろまち４丁目） Japan
- Operator: Okinawa Urban Monorail
- Line: ■ Okinawa Urban Monorail Line
- Tracks: 2

Construction
- Structure type: Elevated
- Accessible: Yes

Other information
- Station code: 11

History
- Opened: August 2003

Services
Preceding station	Okinawa Urban Monorail	Following station
Asato towards Naha Airport	Yui Rail	Furujima towards Tedako-Uranishi
Location

Omoromachi Station (おもろまち駅, Omoromachi-eki) is a railway station on the Okinawa Urban Monorail (Yui Rail) located in Naha, Okinawa Prefecture, Japan. In the original plans, this station was to be called Makabi Station, after the neighboring district, but opened as Omoromachi Station on August 10, 2003.

The station serves the Omoromachi Shintoshin (New City Heart/Center) area, which includes a major shopping complex accessed by an elevated pedestrian deck connected directly to the station, Shintoshin Park, and the Okinawa Prefectural Museum.

From just before Asato Station, through Omoromachi Station, to shortly after Furujima Station, the monorail tracks run directly above, and following, Japan National Route 330 (Asato Bypass).

The chime played to announce train arrivals and departures is the traditional Okinawan folk song Danjukariyushi.

== Lines ==
- Okinawa Urban Monorail

== Layout ==
The station consists of two elevated side platforms serving two tracks.

=== Platforms ===
1	■ Okinawa Urban Monorail	for Tedako-Uranishi
2	■ Okinawa Urban Monorail	for Naha Airport

== History ==
Omoromachi Station opened in August 2003.
