= Prefectural Office Station =

Monorail station in Naha, Okinawa Prefecture, Japan

Coordinates: 26.2144°N 127.6790°E

Prefectural Office Station 県庁前駅
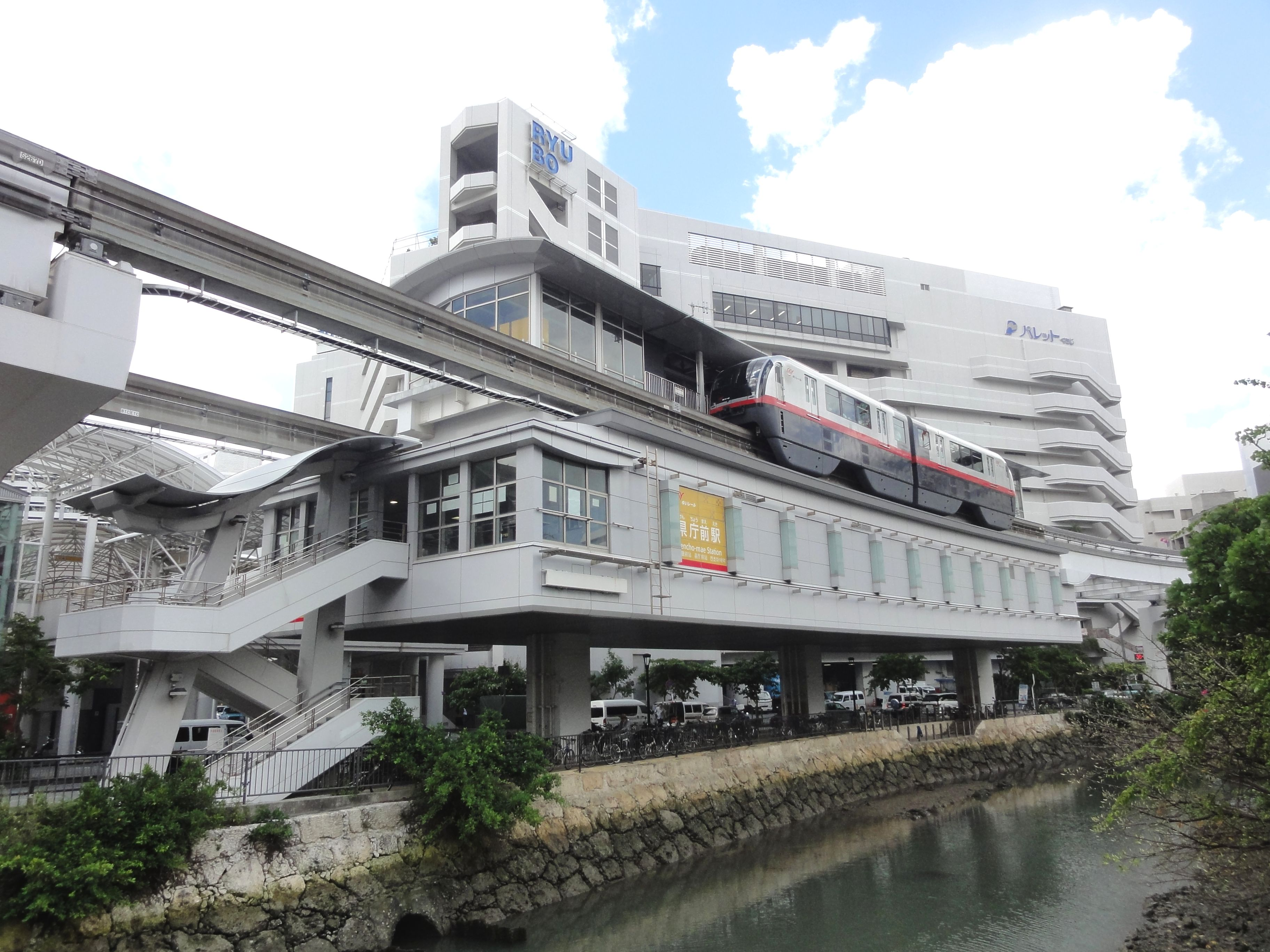

General information
- Location: Naha, Okinawa; Japan
- Operator: Okinawa Urban Monorail
- Line: ■ Okinawa Urban Monorail Line

Construction
- Structure type: Elevated
- Accessible: Yes

Other information
- Station code: 7

History
- Opened: August 2003

Services
Preceding station	Okinawa Urban Monorail	Following station
Asahibashi towards Naha Airport	Yui Rail	Miebashi towards Tedako-Uranishi
Location

Prefectural Office Station (県庁前駅, Kenchō-mae-eki) is a railway station on the Okinawa Urban Monorail (Yui Rail) in Naha, Okinawa Prefecture, Japan.

== Lines ==
- Okinawa Urban Monorail

== Layout ==
The station consists of one elevated island platform serving two tracks.

=== Platforms ===
1	■ Okinawa Urban Monorail	for Tedako-Uranishi
2	■ Okinawa Urban Monorail	for Naha Airport

== History ==
Prefectural Office Station opened in August 2003.

== Surroundings ==
- Okinawa Prefecture Government Building
