= Urasoe-Maeda Station =

Monorail station in Urasoe, Okinawa Prefecture, Japan

Coordinates: 26.2439°N 127.7323°E

Urasoe-Maeda Station 浦添前田駅
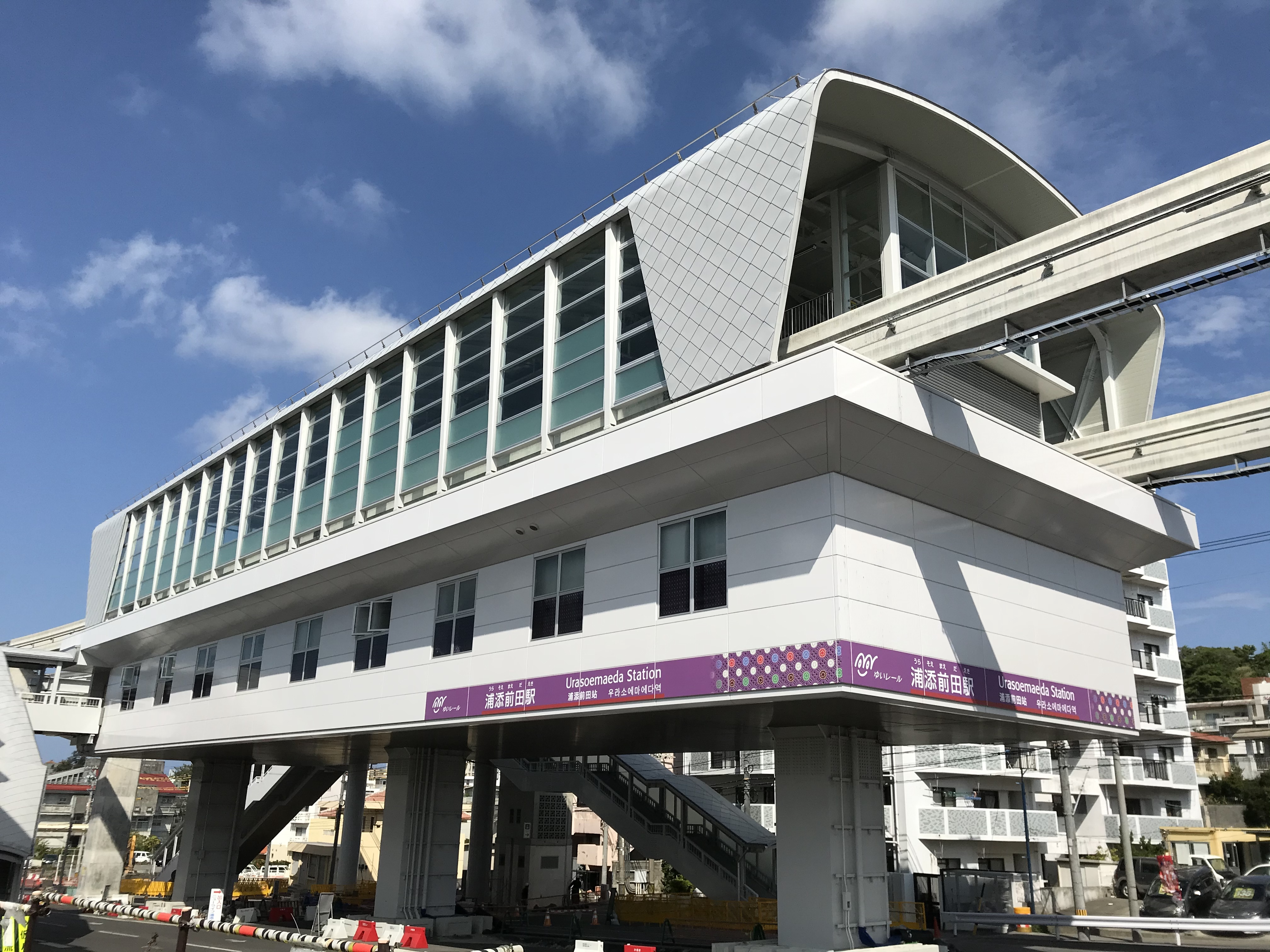
- Urasoe-Maeda Station in February 2020

General information
- Location: Urasoe, Okinawa; Japan
- Operator: Okinawa Urban Monorail
- Line: ■ Okinawa Urban Monorail Line
- Tracks: 2

Construction
- Structure type: Elevated
- Accessible: Yes

Other information
- Station code: 18

History
- Opened: 1 October 2019

Services
Preceding station	Okinawa Urban Monorail	Following station
Kyozuka towards Naha Airport	Yui Rail	Tedako-Uranishi Terminus
Location

Urasoe-Maeda Station (浦添前田駅, Urasoe-Maeda-eki) is a railway station on the Okinawa Urban Monorail (Yui Rail) in Urasoe, Okinawa Prefecture, Japan.

== Lines ==
- Okinawa Urban Monorail

== Layout ==
The station consists of one elevated island platform serving two tracks.

=== Platforms ===
1	■ Okinawa Urban Monorail	for Tedako-Uranishi
2	■ Okinawa Urban Monorail	for Naha Airport

== History ==
The station opened on 1 October 2019 as part of the new extension from Shuri to Tedako-Uranishi.
