= Akamine Station =

Monorail station in Naha, Okinawa Prefecture, Japan

Akamine Station 赤嶺駅
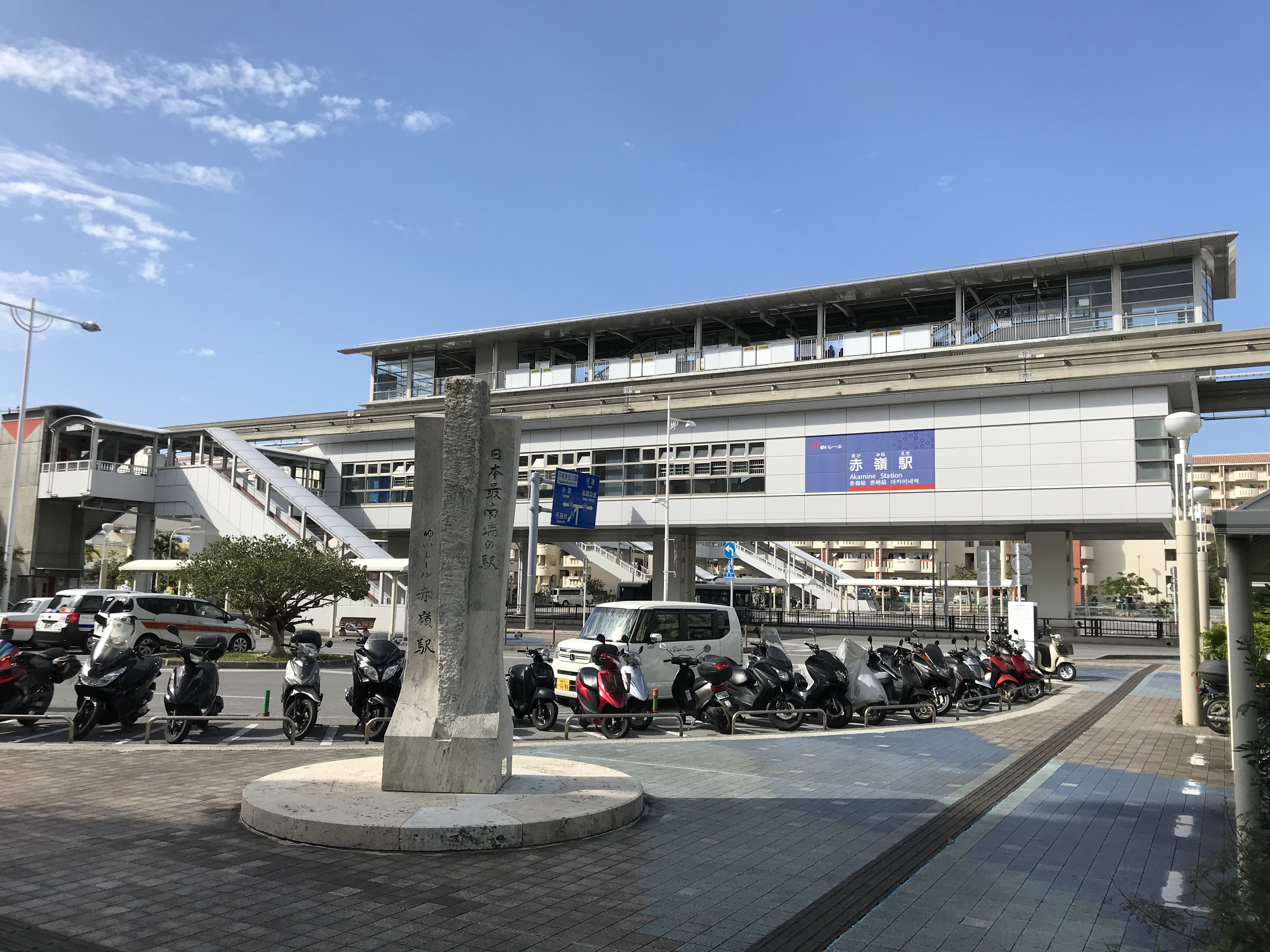

General information
- Location: Naha, Okinawa; Japan
- Coordinates: 26°11′35.6″N 127°39′37.7″E
- Operator: Okinawa Urban Monorail
- Line: ■ Okinawa Urban Monorail Line
- Tracks: 2

Construction
- Structure type: Elevated
- Accessible: Yes

Other information
- Station code: 2

History
- Opened: 10 August 2003

Services
Preceding station	Okinawa Urban Monorail	Following station
Naha Airport Terminus	Yui Rail	Oroku towards Tedako-Uranishi
Location
- Location within Japan

Akamine Station (赤嶺駅, Akamine-eki) is a railway station on the Okinawa Urban Monorail (Yui Rail) in Naha, Okinawa Prefecture, Japan. It is the southernmost train station in Japan.

== Lines ==
- Okinawa Urban Monorail

== Layout ==
The station consists of one elevated island platform serving two tracks.

=== Platforms ===
1	■ Okinawa Urban Monorail	for Tedako-Uranishi
2	■ Okinawa Urban Monorail	for Naha Airport

== History ==
Akamine Station opened on 10 August 2003.

== See also ==
- List of railway stations in Japan
