= OKICA =

Contactless smart card system in Okinawa, Japan

OKICA (オキカ, Okika), short for "Okinawa IC Card", is a contactless smart card used for public transport in Okinawa.

== History and overview ==
OKICA was the first contactless public transportation card introduced in Okinawa Prefecture. It was named by public contest, with the winning name submitted by a fifth grade student named Yuko Nakajima from the village of Yomitan, chosen from 357 submissions. OKICA was introduced on October 20, 2014 on the Okinawa Urban Monorail (Yui Rail), with major bus operators across the main island of Okinawa (Naha Bus, Ryukyu Bus Kotsu, Okinawa Bus, Toyo Bus) adding support on April 27, 2015. On August 16, 2021, some taxis also introduced support for OKICA. Nanjō City's community bus system, N Bus, began support for the card on October 20, 2021.

OKICA sold over 130,000 units during its introductory year and a half. As of March 2023, cards had been issued to 537,000 riders, surpassing the initial 2023 goal of 356,000. A limited-edition design featuring Pokémon characters was released in August 2021 as part of the "Flying Pikachu Project" to promote travel in Okinawa. There is a utilization goal (on Yui Rail) of 60% by 2024.

As of 2020, OKICA supports fareless transport for high school students in the prefecture, along with some senior and disabled riders.

The card is maintained and administered by Okinawa IC Card Co., Ltd., a public corporation based in Naha and created for the purpose of overseeing the card's use.

== Usage ==
OKICA is used on Yui Rail, bus operators, and some taxi services on Okinawa Island. While Yui Rail has also supported the use of Japan's ten major IC cards (such as Suica Suica is not accepted on Monorail, only Okica card (May 2025) or SUGOCA) since March 10, 2020, as of 2024, buses only accept payment via OKICA or cash. Feasibility studies have been conducted as to whether ferries may see support in the future.

Fare loaded onto cards may also be used as e-money at over 100 stores and restaurants on the island.

The card cannot be used outside Okinawa Prefecture, and expires after a period of 10 years without use.
