= Akamine =

Akamine (written: 赤嶺 lit. "red ridge") is a Japanese surname. Notable people with the surname include:

- Júlio Endi Akamine (born 1962), Brazilian Roman Catholic archbishop
- Seiken Akamine (赤嶺 政賢, born 1947), Japanese politician
- Shingo Akamine (赤嶺 真吾, born 1983), Japanese footballer

== See also ==
- Akamine Station, a railway station in Naha, Okinawa Prefecture, Japan
