= Kenchō-mae Station =

Kenchō-mae Station (県庁前駅, Kenchōmae-eki; lit. "in front of the Prefectural Government Offices") is the name of several train stations and tram stops in Japan:

- Kenchō-mae Station (Chiba)
- Kenchō-mae Station (Ehime), a railway station in Japan
- Kenchō-mae Station (Hiroshima)
- Kenchōmae Station (Hyōgo)
- Kenchō-mae Station (Kōchi)
- Kenchō-mae Station (Toyama), a railway station in Japan
- Kenchō-mae Station (Okinawa), or Prefectural Office Station
