= Shuri Station =

Monorail station in Naha, Okinawa Prefecture, Japan

Coordinates: 26°13′09″N 127°43′32″E

Shuri Station 首里駅
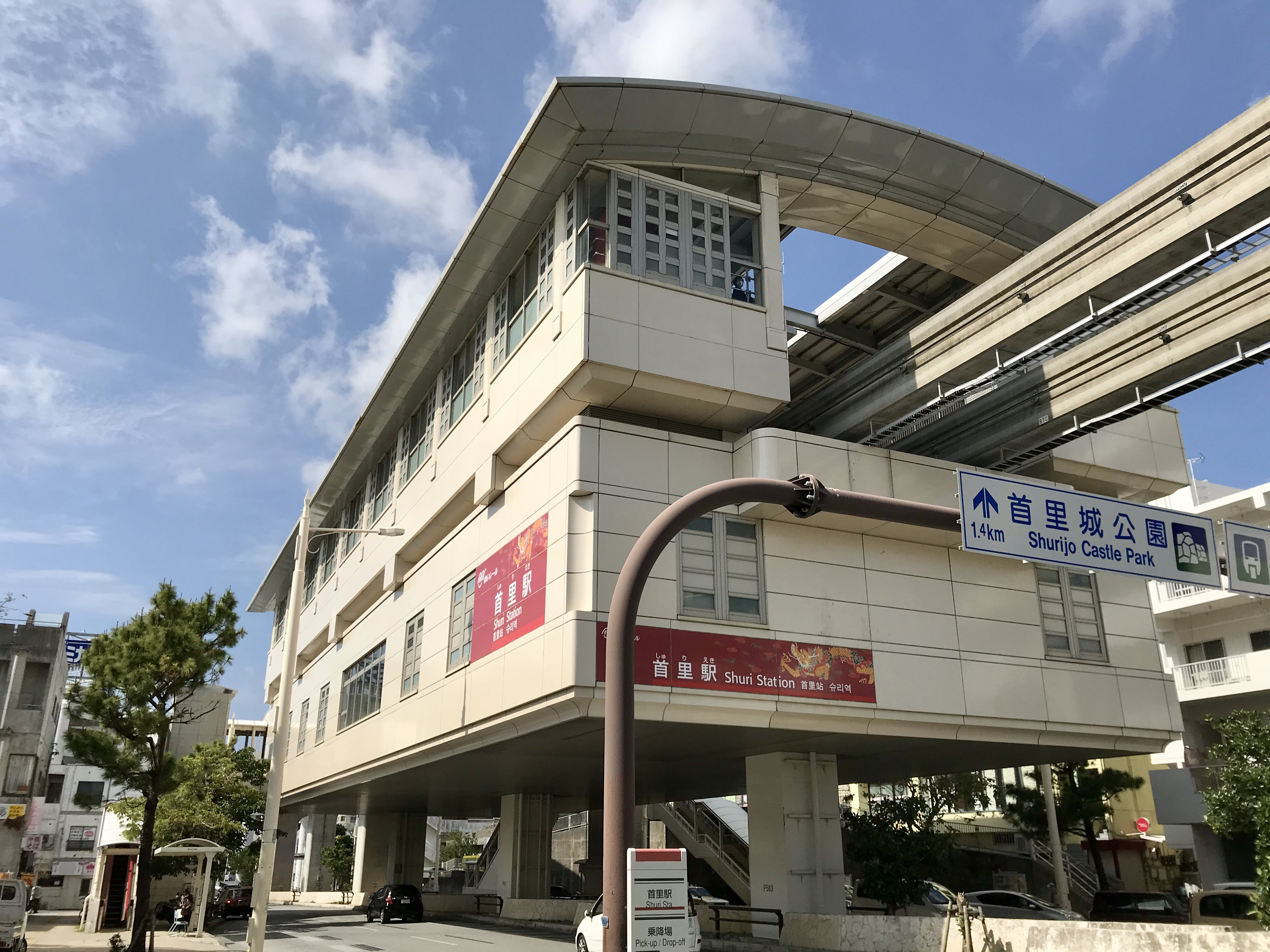
- A concourse

General information
- Location: Shuriterachō 3 Chōme, Naha, Okinawa （那覇市首里汀良町3丁目） Japan
- Operator: Okinawa Urban Monorail
- Line: ■ Okinawa Urban Monorail Line
- Tracks: 2

Construction
- Structure type: Elevated
- Accessible: Yes

Other information
- Station code: 15

History
- Opened: August 2003

Services
| Preceding station | Okinawa Urban Monorail | Following station |
|---|---|---|
| Gibo towards Naha Airport | Yui Rail | Ishimine towards Tedako-Uranishi |
Location

Shuri Station (首里駅, Shuri-eki) is a railway station on the Okinawa Urban Monorail (Yui Rail) located in Naha, Okinawa Prefecture, Japan.

== History ==
The station was originally planned to be named Tera Station (汀良駅, Tera-eki) after the neighborhood within Shuri, but opened as Shuri Station on August 10, 2003. It serves the center of downtown Shuri, Shuri Castle, and its environs.

Shuri Station was originally the eastern terminus of the line. On October 1, 2019, a new eastward extension to Tedako-Uranishi was opened.

== Chime ==
The chime played to announce trains' arrival and departure is the traditional Okinawan nursery rhyme Akata Sunduchi.

== Lines ==
- Okinawa Urban Monorail

== Layout ==
The station consists of two elevated side platforms serving two tracks.

=== Platforms ===
| 1 | ■ Okinawa Urban Monorail | for Tedako-Uranishi |
| 2 | ■ Okinawa Urban Monorail | for Naha Airport |
