= Okinawa Urban Monorail =

Public transit line serving the cities of Naha and Urasoe, Okinawa, Japan

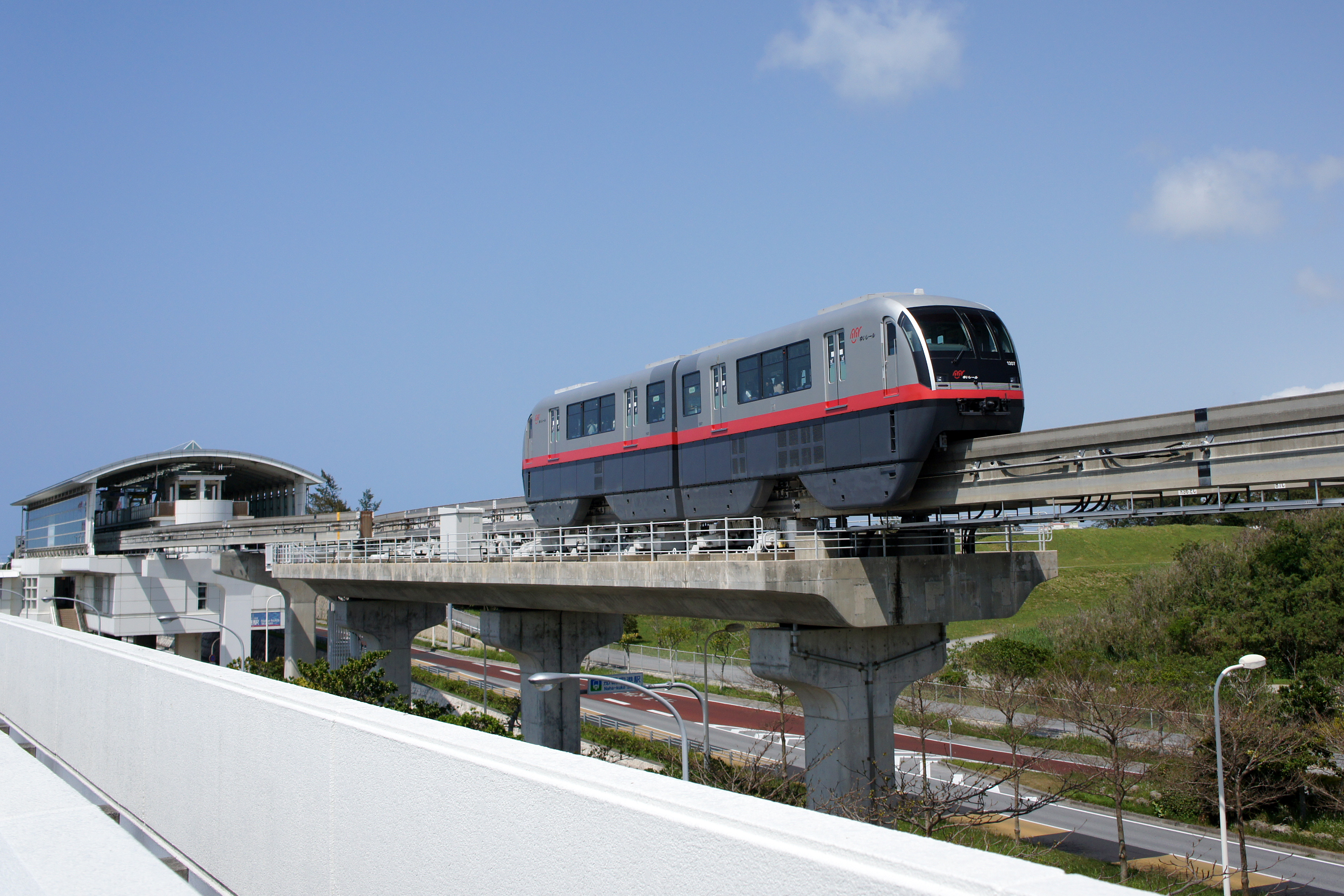
- 1000 series train on the Okinawa Urban Monorail in April 2011

Overview
- Native name: 沖縄都市モノレール
- Locale: Naha and Urasoe; Okinawa Prefecture, Japan
- Transit type: Straddle-beam monorail (Alweg‑type)
- Number of stations: 19
- Daily ridership: 66,017 (JFY25)
- Annual ridership: 24,096,263 (JFY25)

Operation
- Began operation: August 10, 2003
- Operators: Okinawa Urban Monorail, Inc.

Technical
- System length: 17 km (11 mi)
- Electrification: Contact rails, 1,500 V DC
System map
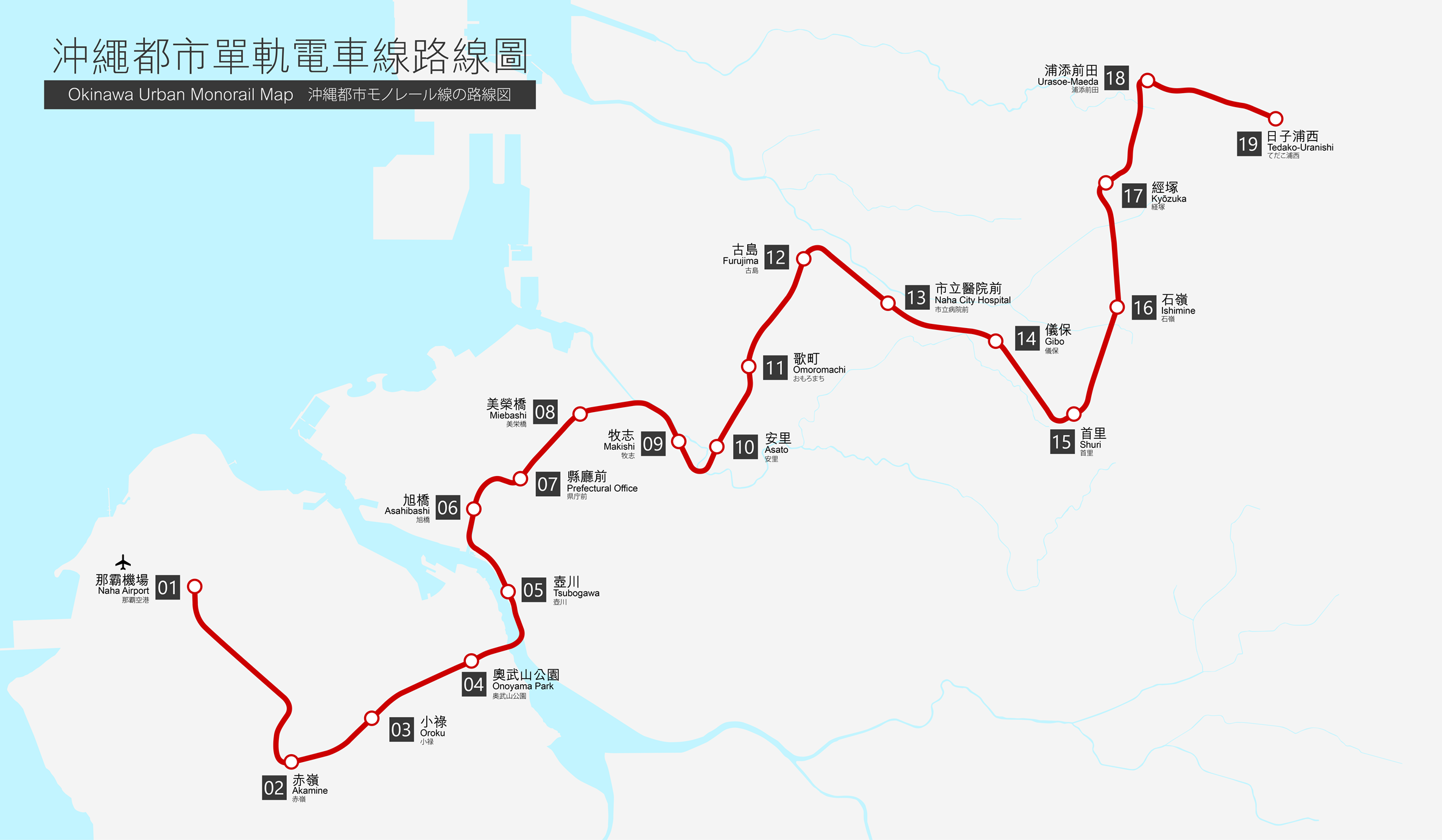

Okinawa Urban Monorail, 2012

The Okinawa Urban Monorail, (Note: Japanese: 沖縄都市モノレール, Hepburn: Okinawa Toshi Monorēru), also known as Yui Rail, (Note: ゆいレール, Yui Rēru) is a straddle-beam, Alweg-type monorail line serving the cities of Naha and Urasoe, Okinawa, Japan. Operated by Okinawa Urban Monorail, Inc., (Note: 沖縄都市モノレール株式会社, Okinawa Toshi Monorēru Kabushiki-gaisha) it opened on August 10, 2003, and is the only public rail system in Okinawa Prefecture. Yui Rail is the first rail line on Okinawa since World War II. Akamine Station and Naha Airport Station, the southernmost and westernmost rail stations in Japan respectively, lie on this line.

The line was planned from 1972, which was the same year as Okinawa's return to Japan. The monorail's route was decided in 1977, and the opening year for the line was set to 1987. However, in order to build the monorail, bus routes in the city had to be revamped, and the discussion with bus operators regarding compensation for the revamp took until 1994. The construction began in 1996, and the line opened on August 10, 2003. The line has since then extended to Urasoe on October 1, 2019.

Trains run on the line from exactly 6:00 a.m. to 11:30 p.m. every day, with an interval of 4–15 minutes. All services stop at every station, although some services terminate at Shuri Station. The line has been using the Okinawa Urban Monorail 1000 series electric multiple units since its opening in 2003, which were mostly manufactured by Hitachi Rail. All stations feature a piece of art and are barrier-free.

== Description ==
The 17.0 km (11 mi) line starts from the Naha Airport station. The line makes several curves before reaching Shuri Station, the line's former terminus. After Ishimine Station, the line enters the city of Urasoe, where the line terminates at Tedako-Uranishi Station. As Okinawa is the island of Japan lying farthest to the south and west that has an active rail line, Akamine Station and Naha Airport Station, the southernmost and westernmost rail stations in Japan respectively, lie on this line.

The monorail's "Yui Rail" brand name and logo were selected in a public competition. The system consists of 19 stations, from Naha Airport in the west to Tedako-Uranishi in the east, running via Naha. The average distance between stations is 0.93 kilometers (0.58 mi). It takes 37 minutes and costs ¥390 to traverse its 17 km (11 mi) length.

The line supports payment via paper tickets or OKICA, the local contactless smart card; additional support for the ten major Japanese IC cards (such as Suica and SUGOCA) began on March 10, 2020. As of 2020, Yui Rail is free-to-ride for high school students in the prefecture.

== History ==
=== Background and construction ===
Prior to the construction of the line, passenger railway lines on the island of Okinawa existed since 1914, when Okinawa Electric, Okinawa Railroad, and Okinawa Prefectural Railways opened their railway lines. However, the lines operated by Okinawa Electric ceased operations after losing passengers to bus lines, while the Okinawa Railroad and Prefectural Railways were destroyed by American air raids and explosions during World War II. While many supported the reconstruction of the railway post-war, the reconstruction of the road networks was prioritized and the routes were abandoned, with the remaining tracks removed due to the lack of steel on the island. The lack of rail transport forced the island to adapt to the American-style car society. The number of cars on the island had caused chronic road congestion around the time when Okinawa was returned to Japan in 1972. In the same year, a law which funded construction of urban monorails was passed. The Naha city began to seriously consider constructing a monorail around this time. In 1973, a report published by the country, prefecture, and Naha city emphasized the importance of establishing a new transit system in Naha. There were two possible routes for the monorail, one passing along the Kumoji River and the other passing through the Kokusai-Dori. The Kumoji River route was picked over the other, with the third-sector operation chosen due to financial reasons in 1977. The Okinawa Urban Monorail, Inc. was established on September 27, 1982. The initial plan's opening year was 1987, with an extension to Shuri by 1990. However, in order to build the monorail, bus routes in the city had to be revamped, and the discussion with bus operators regarding compensation for the revamp took until 1994. The construction of the line began in 1996. On November 30, 1999, the monorail's logo was decided, and the names of the stations were officially revealed. The nickname for the line, "Yui Rail" was also decided on this day. The rolling stocks were brought to the line in August 2002. Test runs started in November that year. The line opened on August 10, 2003. The monorail initially used trains in 2-car formations for all services.

=== Urasoe extension ===
The monorail corporation applied for construction permission for a 4.1 kilometers (2.5 mi), 4-station extension from Shuri Station to Tedako-Uranishi Station, located in Urasoe City in August 2011. Permission was granted on January 26, 2012, with construction planned to start in March 2013. Revenue operations along the extension started on October 1, 2019, using a revised schedule with extended rush hour headways for opening day. Eight new formations entered service on April 27, 2016, to prepare for the extension. Preliminary ridership data from the first week showed that year-on-year ridership was up after the extension opened on October 1. From April 2019, some services that used 2-car formation were changed to use 3-car formation instead in order to transport more passengers, as the average percentage for the number of passengers compared to train capacity exceeded 120%. While some of the infrastructure, such as the stations, supported 3-car formations, a new depot had to be constructed to support the extra train cars. Since the previous trains used in the line did not support 3-car formations, four new train formations were introduced to the line in August 2023.

== Infrastructure and operations ==
The line is operated by the Okinawa Urban Monorail, Inc, a third-sector railway company. The basic infrastructure of the line is constructed by the government, Okinawa Prefecture, or passing municipalities. Trains run on the line from exactly 6:00 a.m. to 11:30 p.m. every day, with an interval of 4–15 minutes. All services stop at every station, although some services terminate at Shuri Station.

=== Ridership ===
The number of passengers on the line steadily grew from its opening in 2003 to 2019, when the COVID-19 pandemic hit. The number of passengers returned to the pre-pandemic growth by 2023.

JFY	Daily ridership	JFY	Daily ridership	JFY	Daily ridership
		2010	35,551	2020	30,044
		2011	36,689	2021	32,263
		2012	39,093	2022	46,326
2003	31,905	2013	40,831	2023	54,803
2004	32,049	2014	41,477	2024	60,898
2005	35,940	2015	44,145	2025	66,017
2006	37,393	2016	47,463		
2007	37,713	2017	49,716		
2008	37,545	2018	52,355		
2009	35,272	2019	55,766		

=== Rolling stock ===
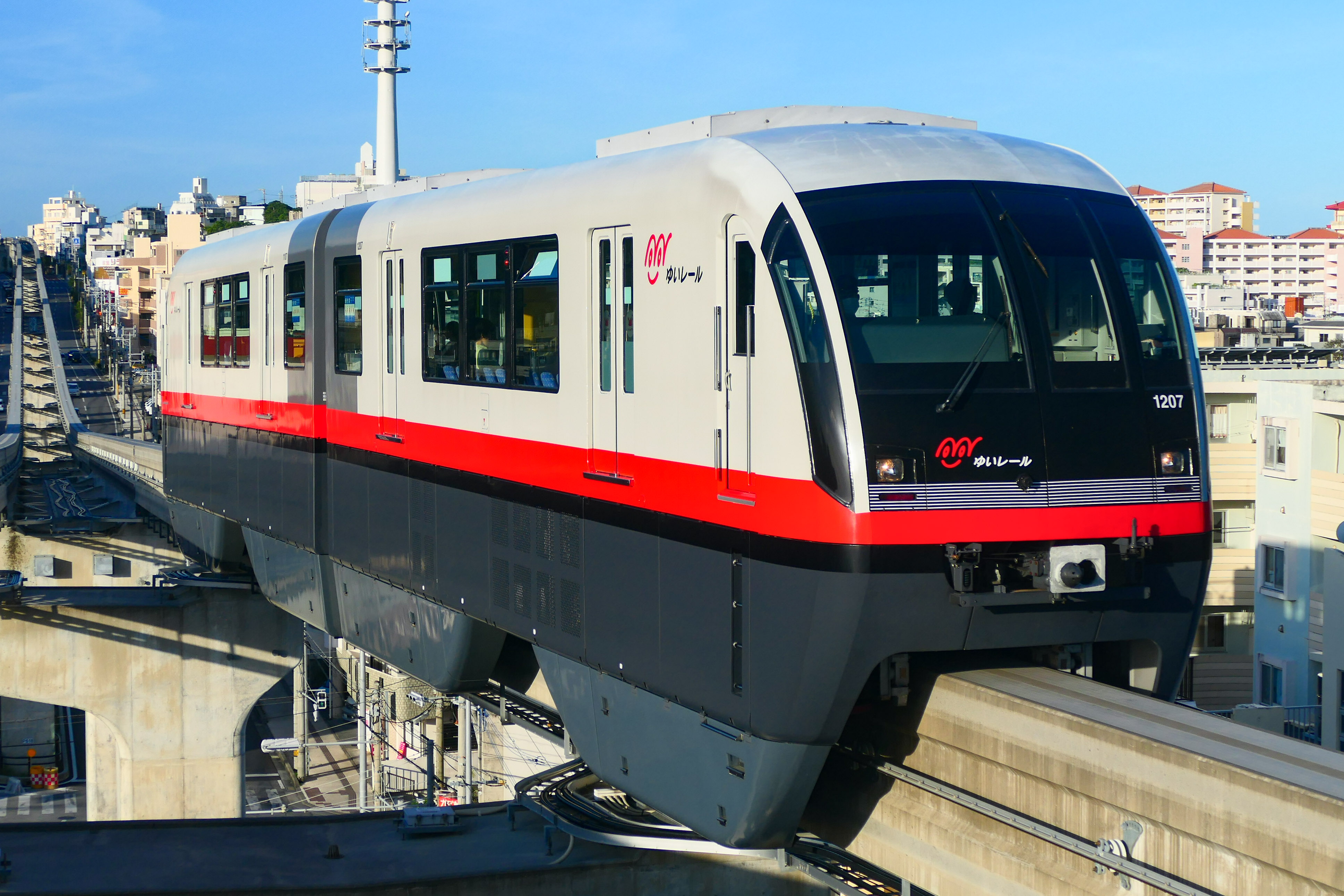
1000 series in 2024

The line has been using the Okinawa Urban Monorail 1000 series electric multiple units since its opening in 2003. The trains have two doors on each side and are mostly manufactured by Hitachi Rail. New formations entered service in April 2016 and August 2023. While the formations from 2003 and 2016 can only be operated in a two-car formation, the cars from 2023 can only be operated in a three-car formation.

=== Stations ===
Platform screen doors are installed on every station's platforms. Although most stations are staffed, some stations may become temporarily unstaffed due to lack of manpower. A single station staff member covers two adjacent stations in some areas. All stations have an elevator and an escalator, and supports wheelchair users. Each station features a piece of art.

Station No.	Picture	Station name	Distance		Location
Station No.	Picture	Station name	Between stations	Total from Naha Airport	Location
1		Naha Airport 那覇空港	—N/a	0 km (0 mi)	Naha
2		Akamine 赤嶺	1.95 km (1.21 mi)	1.95 km (1.21 mi)	Naha
3		Oroku 小禄	0.76 km (0.47 mi)	2.71 km (1.68 mi)	Naha
4		Onoyama Park 奥武山公園	0.97 km (0.60 mi)	3.68 km (2.29 mi)	Naha
5		Tsubogawa 壷川	0.84 km (0.52 mi)	4.52 km (2.81 mi)	Naha
6		Asahibashi 旭橋	0.81 km (0.50 mi)	5.33 km (3.31 mi)	Naha
7		Prefectural Office 県庁前	0.58 km (0.36 mi)	5.91 km (3.67 mi)	Naha
8		Miebashi 美栄橋	0.72 km (0.45 mi)	6.63 km (4.12 mi)	Naha
9		Makishi 牧志	0.98 km (0.61 mi)	7.61 km (4.73 mi)	Naha
10		Asato 安里	0.59 km (0.37 mi)	8.20 km (5.10 mi)	Naha
11		Omoromachi おもろまち	0.75 km (0.47 mi)	8.95 km (5.56 mi)	Naha
12		Furujima 古島	1.01 km (0.63 mi)	9.96 km (6.19 mi)	Naha
13		Naha City Hospital 市立病院前	0.92 km (0.57 mi)	10.88 km (6.76 mi)	Naha
14		Gibo 儀保	0.96 km (0.60 mi)	11.84 km (7.36 mi)	Naha
15		Shuri 首里	1.00 km (0.62 mi)	12.84 km (7.98 mi)	Naha
16		Ishimine 石嶺	1.06 km (0.66 mi)	13.90 km (8.64 mi)	Naha
17		Kyozuka 経塚	1.10 km (0.68 mi)	15.00 km (9.32 mi)	Urasoe
18		Urasoe-Maeda 浦添前田	1.00 km (0.62 mi)	16.00 km (9.94 mi)	Urasoe
19		Tedako-Uranishi てだこ浦西	1.00 km (0.62 mi)	17.00 km (10.56 mi)	Urasoe

== See also ==
- Monorails in Japan
- List of rapid transit systems
- Rail transportation in Okinawa
