= Okinawa Prefecture Government Building =

Building in Naha City, Okinawa, Japan

Coordinates: 26.2124°N 127.681°E

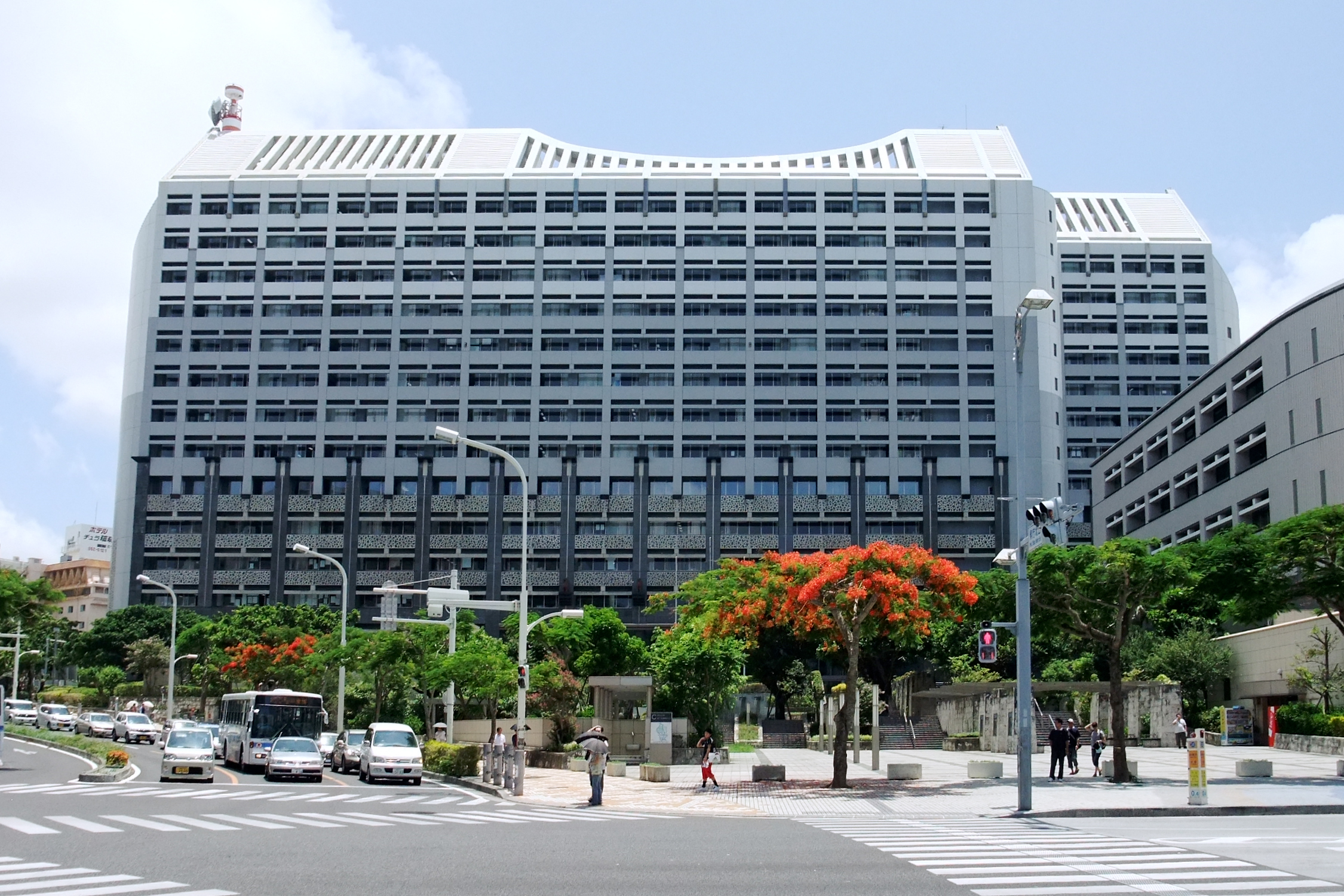

The Okinawa Prefecture Government Building (Japanese: 沖縄県庁舎, Hepburn: Okinawakenchōsha) is one of the tallest buildings in Naha City, Okinawa, Japan, and is the center for Japanese governmental functions stretching across Okinawa Prefecture.

The building opened in 1990 and cost nearly 22 billion yen (about 200 million USD). It was designed by architect Kisho Kurokawa. There are 14 floors above ground and two below including a city hall and government information center. The top floor houses an observation deck where a panoramic view of Naha City can be seen.
