= Naha =

Capital city of Okinawa Prefecture, Japan

Naha 那覇市
- Prefecture capital and core city
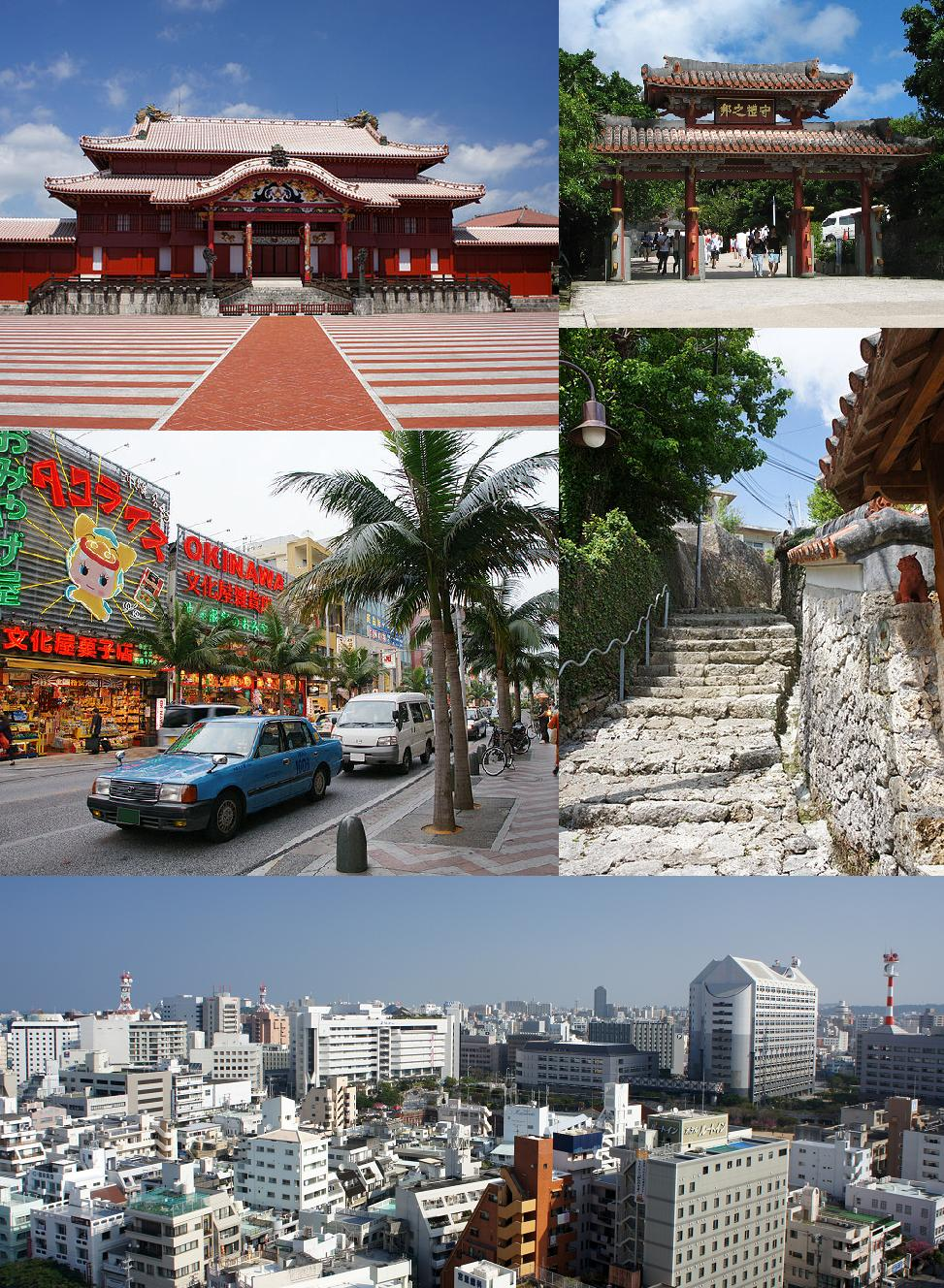
- From top left: Shuri Castle, Shureimon, Kokusai dōri, Kinjocho Ishidatami-michi, Central Naha

- Flag Emblem

- Location of Naha in Okinawa Prefecture

- Location within Japan
- Coordinates: 26°12′44″N 127°40′45″E
- Country: Japan
- Region: Kyushu (Ryukyu)
- Prefecture: Okinawa
- First official recorded: 1322
- Special district Settled: 1896
- City Settled: May 20, 1921

Government
  - Mayor: Satoru Chinen (Note: Since 16 November 2022.)

Area
  - Prefecture capital and core city: 39.98 km^{2} (15.44 sq mi)
  - Urban: 478.57 km^{2} (184.78 sq mi)

Population (2025)
  - Prefecture capital and core city: 313,424
  - Density: 7,840/km^{2} (20,300/sq mi)
- Time zone: UTC+9 (Japan Standard Time)
- Phone number: 098-867-0111
- Address: 1-1-1 Izumizaki, Naha-shi 900-8585
- Climate: Cfa
- Website: www.city.naha.okinawa.jp
- Symbols
- Flower: Bougainvillea
- Tree: Fukugi

Naha (Japanese: 那覇市, Hepburn: Naha-shi; Japanese pronunciation: [nä́.hä̀, nä̀.hä́.ɕì]; Okinawan: Naafa or Nafa) is the capital city of Okinawa Prefecture, the southernmost prefecture of Japan. As of 1 June 2019, the city has an estimated population of 317,405 and a population density of 7,939 people per km^{2} (20,562 persons per sq. mi.). The total area is 39.98 km^{2} (15.44 sq mi).

Naha is located on the East China Sea coast of the southern part of Okinawa Island, the largest island of Okinawa Prefecture. The modern city was officially founded on May 20, 1921. Before that, Naha had for centuries been one of the most important and populous sites in Okinawa.

Naha is the political, economic and educational center of Okinawa Prefecture. In the medieval and early modern periods, it was the commercial center of the Ryukyu Kingdom.

== History ==
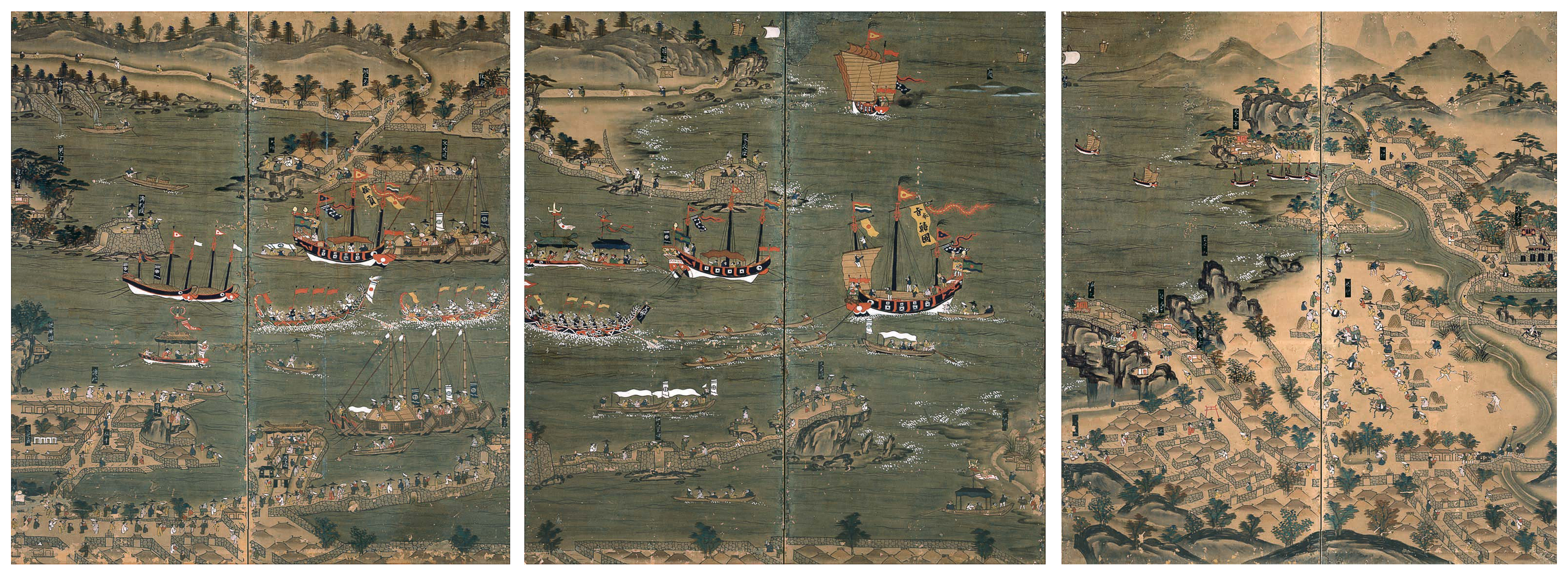
Naha Harbor during the Ryukyu Kingdom

According to the Irosetsuden (遺老説伝), the name of Naha comes from its original name, Naba, which was the name of a large, mushroom-shaped stone in the city. (Naba is a Western Japanese and Ryukyuan word for "mushroom.") Gradually, the stone wore away and became buried, and the name's pronunciation and its kanji gradually changed.

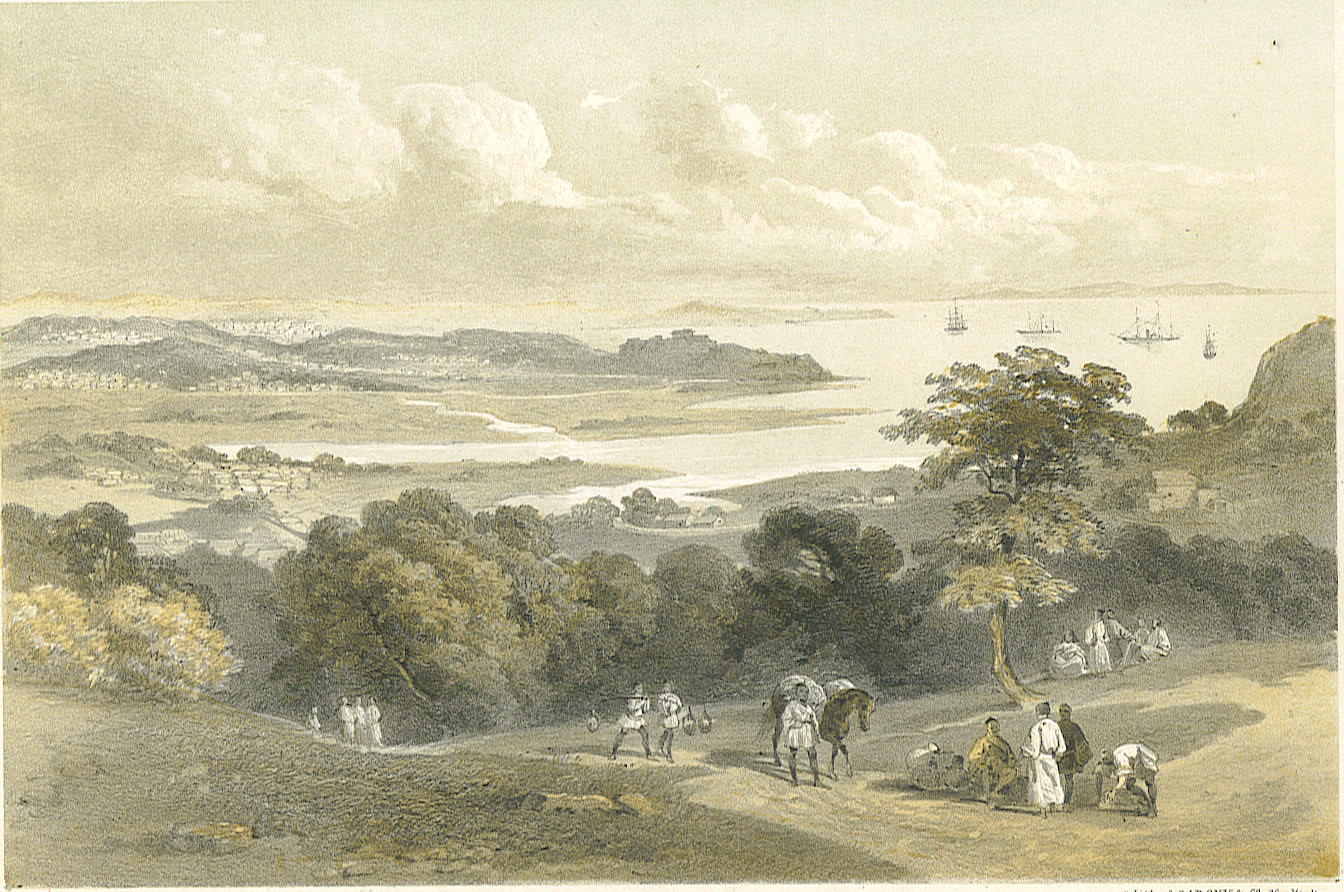
"Naha from Bamboo Village" looking toward the seashore. Lithography by Wilhelm Heine (1856).

In Naha, some archeological relics of the Stone Age were found. From a Jōmon period kaizuka (shell mound), ancient Chinese coins were found. Pottery found by archaeologists indicates that the area was an active site of trade with the Japanese archipelago and Korean peninsula at least as early as the 11th century. Though it is not known just when the area first became organized as a functioning port city, it was active as such by the time of the unification of the Ryūkyū Kingdom in the early 15th century.

Though today Naha has grown to incorporate the former royal capital city of Shuri, center of Chinese learning Kumemura, and other towns and villages, in the period of the Ryūkyū Kingdom, it was a smaller city, prominent as a major port, but not as a political center.

Medieval Naha was on a tiny island called Ukishima, connected to the mainland of Okinawa Island by a narrow causeway called Chōkōtei (長虹堤, lit. "long rainbow embankment") which led on to Shuri. The main port area for international trade, Naha proper, was divided into the East (東, higashi) and West (西, nishi) districts and was on the southwestern portion of Ukishima. A large open-air marketplace was active in front of the royal government trading center, or oyamise (親見世). A number of Japanese temples and shrines were located here, along with a residence and embassy, known as the Tenshikan (天使館), for visiting Chinese officials. A pair of forts (Mie gusuku and Yarazamori gusuku) built atop embankments extending out across the entrance to the harbor defended the port, and a small island within the harbor held a warehouse, Omono gusuku (御物グスク), used for storing trade goods.

Tomari (泊), on the mainland of Okinawa Island to the northeast of Ukishima, served as the chief port for trade within the Ryūkyū Islands. The administrators of Tomari were also responsible for collecting and managing the tribute paid to the kingdom by the Amami Islands, whose tribute ships made port here.

Kume-Ōdōri (久米大通り; "Kume Great Avenue") ran across Ukishima from southeast to northwest, forming the center of the walled community of Kumemura, the center of classical Chinese learning in Ryūkyū for centuries. Kumemura is traditionally believed to have been founded by 36 Min families sent to Ryūkyū by the Ming Chinese Imperial Court and to be inhabited primarily or solely by descendants of those settlers; historian Uezato Takashi points out, however, that due to Naha's prominence in international maritime trade networks, it is quite likely that many other Chinese, chiefly from Fujian and other maritime trading areas along the southern Chinese coast, would have settled here as well.

Major sites in the community included the Tensonbyō Taoist temple near the northern end of Kume-Ōdōri and two shrines called Upper and Lower Tenpigū, dedicated to the Taoist goddess of the sea Tenpi, also known as Matsu. A Confucian temple, the gift of the Kangxi Emperor, was built in Kumemura in the 1670s; the Meirindō, a school of classic Confucian Chinese learning, was established in 1718. Following their destruction in World War II, the Meirindō, Confucian temple, and Tenpigū shrines were rebuilt on the site of the Tensonbyō in northern Kume, where they stand today as the Confucian temple Shiseibyō.

On the northwest side of Ukishima lay Wakasamachi (若狭町; "Wakasa town"), a community traditionally said to have been founded by Japanese settlers. It was organized around Wakasamachi-Ōdōri, an avenue which intersected with Kume-Ōdōri and ran across tidal mudflats to the east of Ukishima, connecting the community to the port of Tomari on the Okinawan mainland. A number of Japanese shrines and temples were located in Wakasamachi, including the Naminoue Shrine, the Zen temple Kōganji, and temples devoted to Ebisu and Jizō. The community had lodgings specifically set aside for traders and travelers from the Tokara Islands.

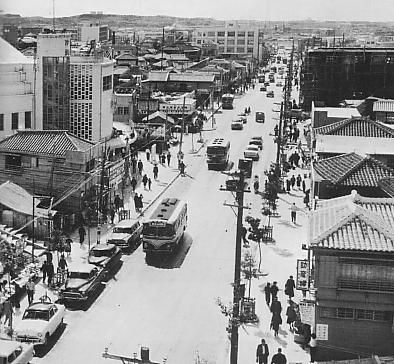
Kokusai Dori, International Main Street in Naha, 1950s

Another settlement, known as Izumizaki, lay on the mainland of Okinawa Island, just across the Kumoji River from Ukishima. Izumizaki had no notable or major port facilities and is believed to have been simply an extension of the residential community of Naha proper, which thus spread onto the mainland as the population and according demand for land grew. At some point, the tidal mudflats and Kumoji River separating Ukishima, that is, Naha, from Okinawa Island were filled in. The neighborhoods of Kume, Wakasa, and Tomari can still be found in Naha today.

Commodore Matthew C. Perry's expeditionary squadron stopped in Naha en route to Tokyo in 1853; and the American ships visited several more times. The lithographs prepared from drawings made by the expedition's official artist would be widely circulated. These images would provide the basis for 19th century impressions of the geography and people of the Ryūkyū islands.

After the replacement of the Ryūkyū Kingdom with the Ryūkyū Domain in 1872, Naha became the capital city. The Ryūkyū Domain was abolished in 1879 and the former Ryūkyū Kingdom came to an end, fully annexed by Japan as Okinawa Prefecture, with Naha remaining as the capital city. Shuri and other neighboring municipalities were absorbed into the city.

An Imperial decree in July 1899 established Naha as an open port for trading with the United States and the United Kingdom.

During the battle of Okinawa in World War II, Naha suffered extensive damage from the fighting. The entire center of the city had to be rebuilt. On 1 September 1954, the village of Oroku was merged into the city.

On April 1, 2013, Naha became a core city, a category of cities of Japan under the Local Autonomy Law of Japan. Naha now carries out many of the functions, notably for public health care, normally delegated to the prefectural government. Naha is the first core city in Okinawa Prefecture.

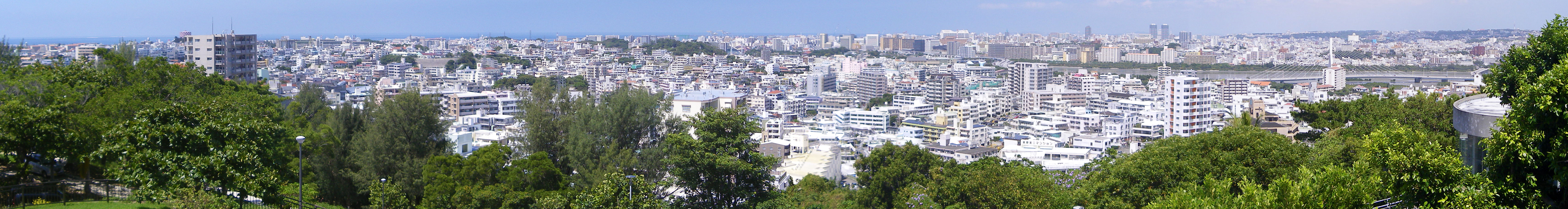
Panoramic view of Naha City seen from the Kaigungo Navy Headquarters Park

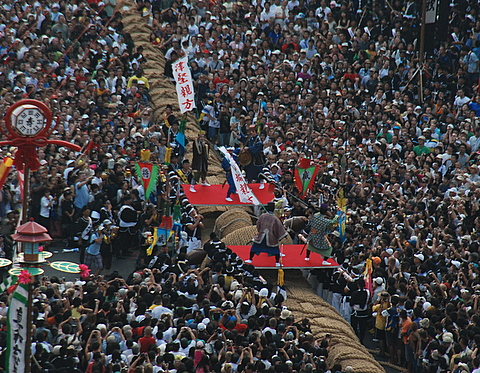
Naha Festival in October 2008

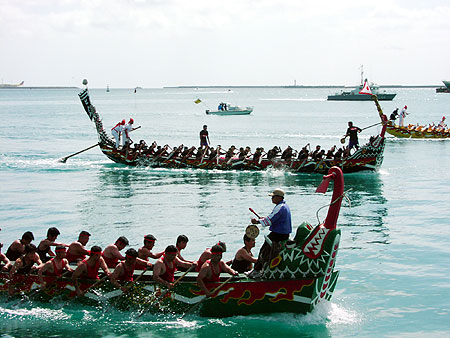
Naha Hari, dragon style boat event

== Geography ==
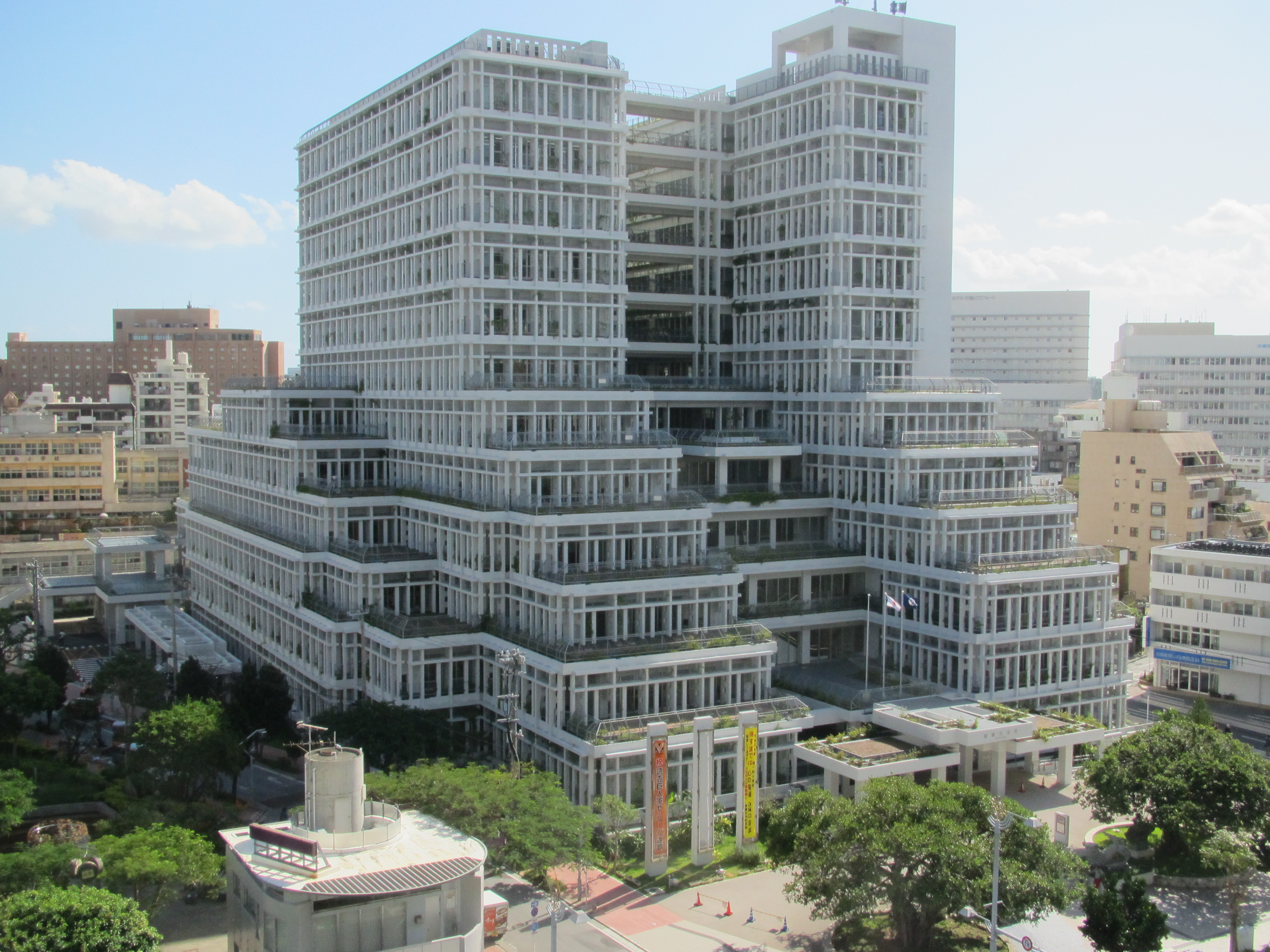
Naha City Hall in 2013

=== City center ===
Central Naha consists of the Palette Kumoji shopping mall, the Okinawa Prefecture Office, Naha City Hall, and many banks and corporations, located at the west end of Kokusai-dōri, the city's main street. Kokusai-dōri (国際通り; "International Avenue") boasts a 1.6 kilometer (1 mile) long stretch of stores, restaurants and bars. Kokusai-dōri ends at the main bus terminal in Okinawa and is served by several stations along the Okinawa Urban Monorail, the only train system in the prefecture.

Spurring off from Kokusai-dōri is the covered Heiwa-dōri Shopping Arcade and Makishi Public Market, a massive shōtengai filled with fresh fish, meat, and produce stands, restaurants, tourist goods shops, and liquor shops. Just outside the market area is the neighborhood of Tsuboya (壺屋; "pot/jar shop"), which was once a major center of ceramic production (see Tsuboya-yaki).

Northeast of Kokusai-dōri is a relatively new commercial district called Shintoshin (新都心; "New Metropolitan Center"). The area, formerly United States military housing, was released to Okinawa in 1987, but major development only began in the mid-1990s. Omoromachi Station is attached directly to an upscale shopping mall; another mall, Naha Main Place, a few hundred meters (yards) down the street, contains many upscale Western-brand fashion boutiques, with restaurants and other shops. Frequented by young people, the area boasts large stores such as Toys R Us and Best Denki (an electronics store), a co-op market, many restaurants and a movie theater.

The Okinawa Prefectural Museum, containing sections devoted to the art, history, and natural history of the Ryukyus, opened in the area in November 2007 and sits in front of Shintoshin Park.

=== Administrative divisions ===
The city includes seventy-eight wards. Among the former municipalities, only Shuri still exists administratively as a local subdivision.

- Aja (安謝)
- Akamine (赤嶺)
- Akebono (曙)
- Ameku (天久)
- Asahimachi (旭町)
- Asato (安里)
- Ashimine (安次嶺)
- Daidō (大道)
- Furujima (古島)
- Gushi (具志)
- Hantagawa (繁多川)
- Higashimachi (東町)
- Higawa (樋川)
- Izumizaki (泉崎)
- Kagamizu (鏡水)
- Kakinohana (垣花町)
- Kanagusuku (金城)
- Kohagura (古波蔵)
- Kokuba (国場)
- Kume (久米)
- Kumoji (久茂地)
- Kyōhara (鏡原町)
- Maejima (前島)
- Māji (真地)
- Makabi (真嘉比)
- Makishi (牧志)
- Matsugawa (松川)
- Matsuo (松尾)
- Matsushima (松島)
- Matsuyama (松山)
- Mekaru (銘苅)
- Mihara (三原)
- Minatomachi (港町)
- Miyagusuku (宮城)
- Nagata (長田)
- Nakaima (仲井真)
- Nishi (西)
- Ōmine (大嶺)
- Omoromachi (おもろまち)
- Oonoyama (奥武山町)
- Oroku (小禄)
- Shikina (識名)
- Shuri (首里)
  - Akahira (赤平町)
  - Akata (赤田町)
  - Gibo (儀保町)
  - Ikehata (池端町)
  - Ishimine (石嶺町)
  - Kinjō (金城町)
  - Kubagawa (久場川町)
  - Mawashi (真和志町)
  - Ōna (大名町)
  - Ōnaka (大中町)
  - Sakiyama (崎山町)
  - Samukawa (寒川町)
  - Sueyoshi (末吉町)
  - Taira (平良町)
  - Tera (汀良町)
  - Tōbaru (桃原町)
  - Tōnokura (当蔵町)
  - Torihori (鳥堀町)
  - Yamagawa (山川町)
- Sobe (楚辺)
- Sumiyoshi (住吉町)
- Tabaru (田原)
- Takara (高良)
- Tōma (当間)
- Tomari (泊)
- Tondō (通堂町)
- Tsubokawa (壺川)
- Tsuboya (壺屋)
- Tsuji (辻)
- Uebaru (宇栄原)
- Uema (上間)
- Uenoya (上之屋)
- Wakasa (若狭)
- Yamashitachō (山下町)
- Yogi (与儀)
- Yorimiya (寄宮)

=== Climate ===
Naha has a humid subtropical climate (Köppen climate classification Cfa)—bordering on tropical rainforest climate (Köppen climate classification Af)—with hot summers and mild winters. Precipitation is abundant throughout the year; September is the wettest month and December is the driest. Naha has hot and humid summers with July and August being the city's warmest months, exceeding an average high of 31 degrees Celsius (88 °F). Naha has warm winters, with average high temperatures in the coolest months of January and February, hovering around 19–20 degrees Celsius (66 to 68 °F) and average lows around 14–15 degrees Celsius (57 to 59 °F). The city sees a substantial amount of rainfall, averaging in excess of 2,000 mm (79 in) of rain per year.

Climate data for Naha (1991–2020 normals, extremes 1890–present)
Month	Jan	Feb	Mar	Apr	May	Jun	Jul	Aug	Sep	Oct	Nov	Dec	Year
Record high °C (°F)	27.0 (80.6)	27.1 (80.8)	28.2 (82.8)	30.6 (87.1)	32.0 (89.6)	34.3 (93.7)	36.0 (96.8)	35.6 (96.1)	34.6 (94.3)	34.2 (93.6)	31.6 (88.9)	29.4 (84.9)	36.0 (96.8)
Mean maximum °C (°F)	24.4 (75.9)	25.0 (77.0)	26.3 (79.3)	28.1 (82.6)	30.1 (86.2)	32.4 (90.3)	33.7 (92.7)	33.5 (92.3)	32.8 (91.0)	31.0 (87.8)	28.6 (83.5)	26.1 (79.0)	34.0 (93.2)
Mean daily maximum °C (°F)	19.8 (67.6)	20.2 (68.4)	21.9 (71.4)	24.3 (75.7)	27.0 (80.6)	29.8 (85.6)	31.9 (89.4)	31.8 (89.2)	30.6 (87.1)	28.1 (82.6)	25.0 (77.0)	21.5 (70.7)	26.0 (78.8)
Daily mean °C (°F)	17.3 (63.1)	17.5 (63.5)	19.1 (66.4)	21.5 (70.7)	24.2 (75.6)	27.2 (81.0)	29.1 (84.4)	29.0 (84.2)	27.9 (82.2)	25.5 (77.9)	22.5 (72.5)	19.0 (66.2)	23.3 (73.9)
Mean daily minimum °C (°F)	14.9 (58.8)	15.1 (59.2)	16.7 (62.1)	19.1 (66.4)	22.1 (71.8)	25.2 (77.4)	27.0 (80.6)	26.8 (80.2)	25.8 (78.4)	23.5 (74.3)	20.4 (68.7)	16.8 (62.2)	21.1 (70.0)
Mean minimum °C (°F)	10.6 (51.1)	11.0 (51.8)	12.2 (54.0)	14.5 (58.1)	18.0 (64.4)	21.5 (70.7)	24.5 (76.1)	24.6 (76.3)	23.2 (73.8)	20.1 (68.2)	16.5 (61.7)	12.7 (54.9)	9.9 (49.8)
Record low °C (°F)	6.1 (43.0)	4.9 (40.8)	6.3 (43.3)	8.7 (47.7)	11.0 (51.8)	14.8 (58.6)	20.8 (69.4)	20.7 (69.3)	17.0 (62.6)	14.8 (58.6)	8.6 (47.5)	6.8 (44.2)	4.9 (40.8)
Average precipitation mm (inches)	101.6 (4.00)	114.5 (4.51)	142.8 (5.62)	161.0 (6.34)	245.3 (9.66)	284.4 (11.20)	188.1 (7.41)	240.0 (9.45)	275.2 (10.83)	179.2 (7.06)	119.1 (4.69)	110.0 (4.33)	2,161 (85.08)
Average precipitation days (≥ 0.5 mm)	12.2	11.3	12.6	11.6	13.1	12.4	11.0	13.9	13.3	10.6	9.6	10.7	142.0
Average relative humidity (%)	66	69	71	75	78	83	78	78	75	72	69	67	73
Mean monthly sunshine hours	93.1	93.1	115.3	120.9	138.2	159.5	227.0	206.3	181.3	163.3	121.7	107.4	1,727.1
Source: Japan Meteorological Agency

== Culture ==
=== Religion ===
There are numerous shrines throughout the city, ranging from small huts to temples consisting of several houses. The religion is a mix of Shintoism, Buddhism, Taoism, and indigenous traditions. The most visible part of the local beliefs though is by far the shisa, the Okinawan shiisaa ("lion dogs") that are considered protectors of the island and are found everywhere – walls, roofs, windows, street corners and parks.

The Cathedral of the Immaculate Heart of Mary (Kainan Church) is the episcopal see of the Roman Catholic Diocese of Naha.

=== Festivals ===
- Naha Hari in May
- Naha Festival in October
- Naha Tug-of-war

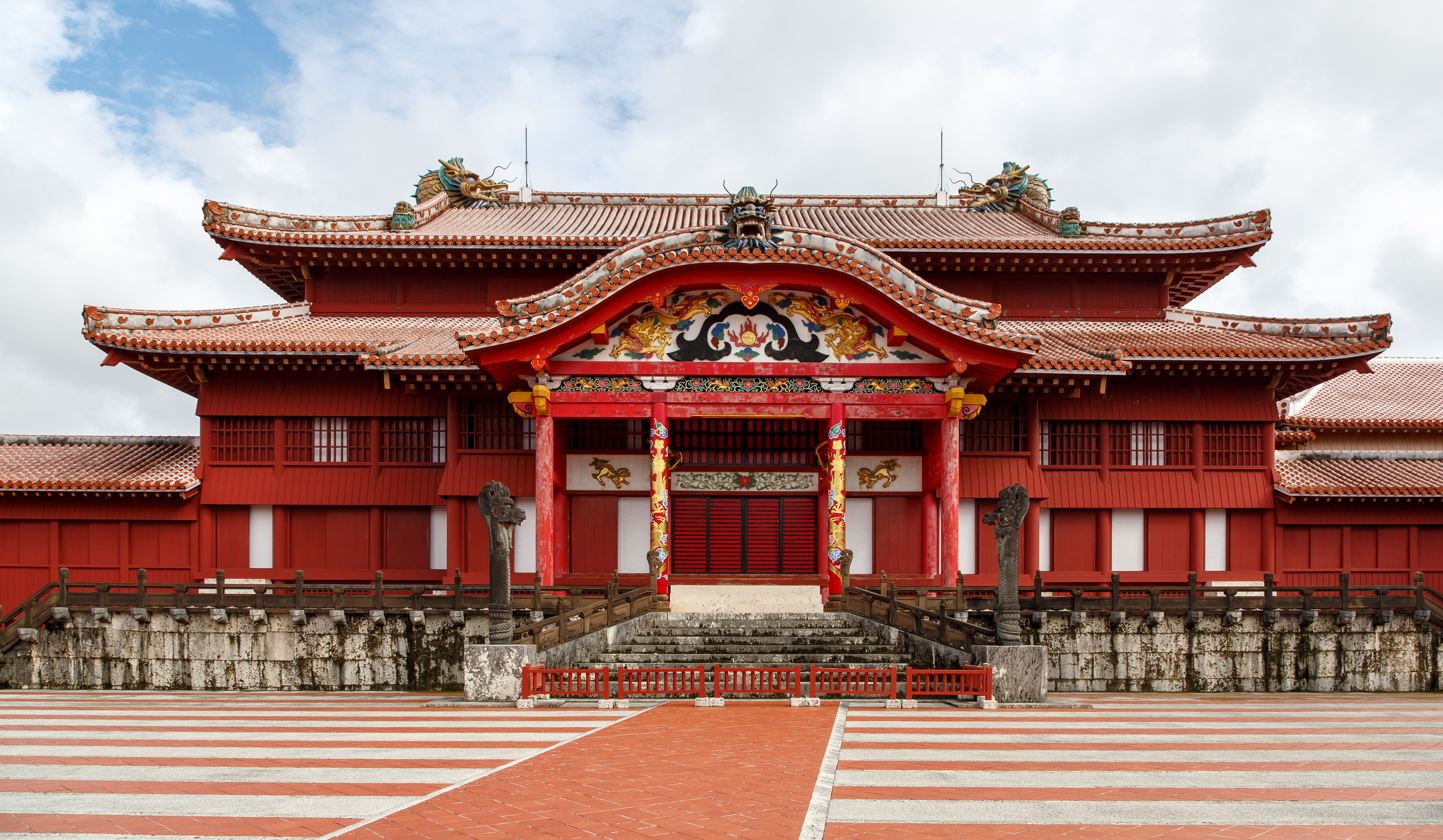
Front façade of the Shuri Castle

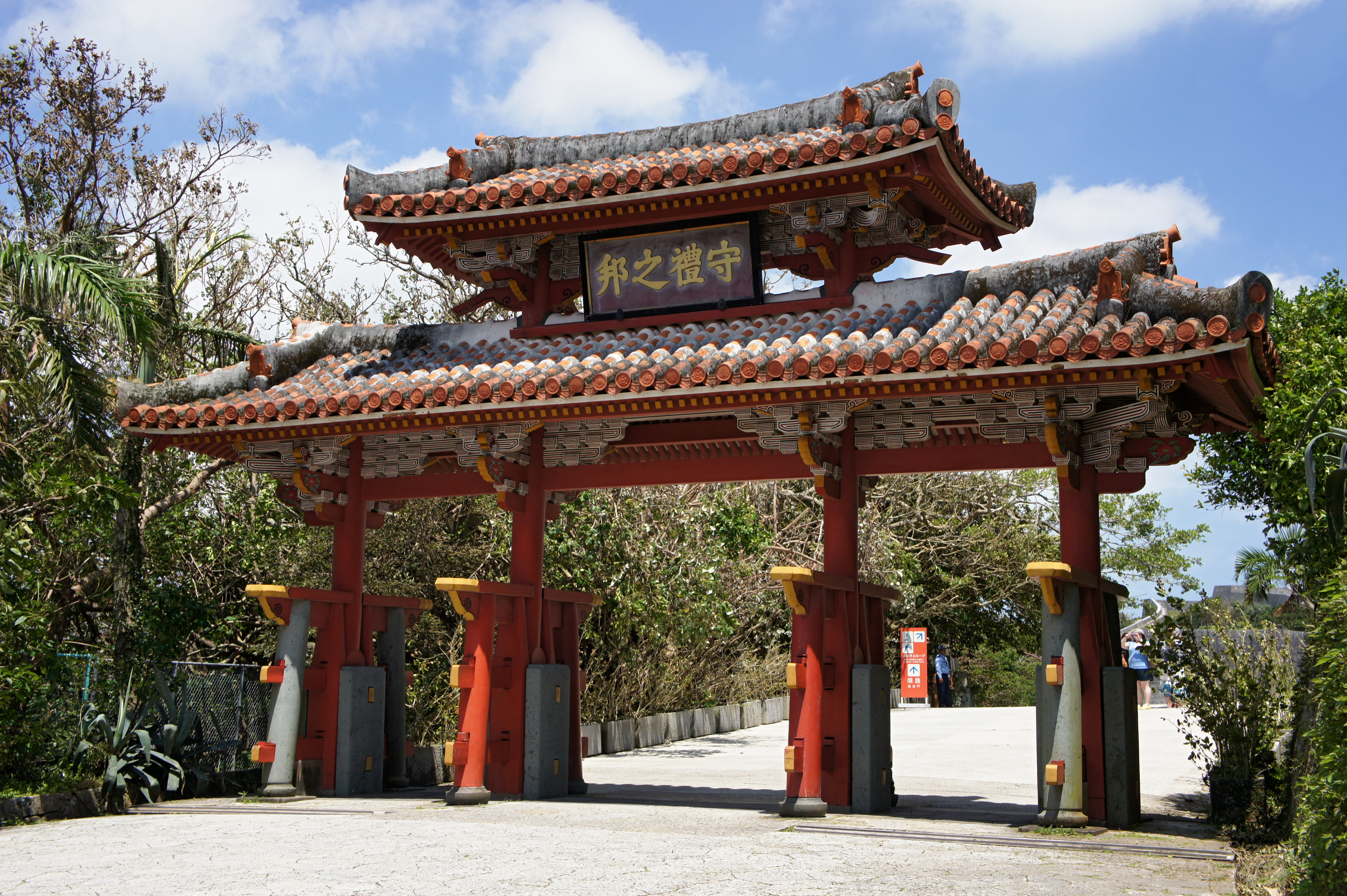
Shureimon gate

=== Sights ===
The restored and rebuilt Shuri Castle, the former royal palace of the Ryūkyū Kingdom, is one of the finest gusuku (Okinawan castle) and among the most important historical sites in Naha. The palace, and a series of tunnels underneath it, were used as a major command post by the Imperial Japanese military during World War II, and the castle was subsequently almost destroyed in 1945 by the US Marines, Army and Navy. After the war, the University of the Ryūkyūs was constructed on the site. Today Shuri Castle has been reconstructed, including the famous Shureimon, its main gate, and is registered, along with a number of other gusuku and other Okinawan historical and sacred sites, as a UNESCO World Heritage Site.

Lake Man, covered with mangrove woods on the boundary of the city of Tomigusuku, is listed on the Ramsar list of wetlands.

=== Martial arts ===
Naha-te, (Naha-hand), called Nawate by Gichin Funakoshi, is a type of martial art developed in Naha. The successor styles to Naha-te include Gōjū-ryū, Uechi-ryū, Ryūei-ryū, and Tōon-ryū.

== Education ==
Four universities are in the Naha area. Two are run by Okinawa Prefecture; two are private. The University of the Ryukyus, the sole national university in Okinawa Prefecture, was also in Naha, on the site of Shuri Castle. Before the restoration of the castle, the university moved to the town of Nishihara to the northeast of Naha.

Naha's public elementary and junior high schools are operated by the Naha City Board of Education. Naha's public high schools are operated by the Okinawa Prefectural Board of Education. Private schools include the Okinawa Actors' School.

== Economy ==
Naha is an economic center of Okinawa dominated by tourism, retail and service industries. Okinawa's largest banks, Bank of the Ryukyus, Bank of Okinawa and Okinawa Kaiho Bank, are headquartered in Naha. The Bank of Japan, Mizuho Bank, Shoko Chukin Bank and Japan Post Bank also have branches in Naha. Major international insurance companies also have call centers based in the city.

Naha Airport is a major transportation hub for the region, and Japan Transocean Air and Ryukyu Air Commuter, subsidiaries of Japan Airlines, are headquartered in Naha.

== Transportation ==
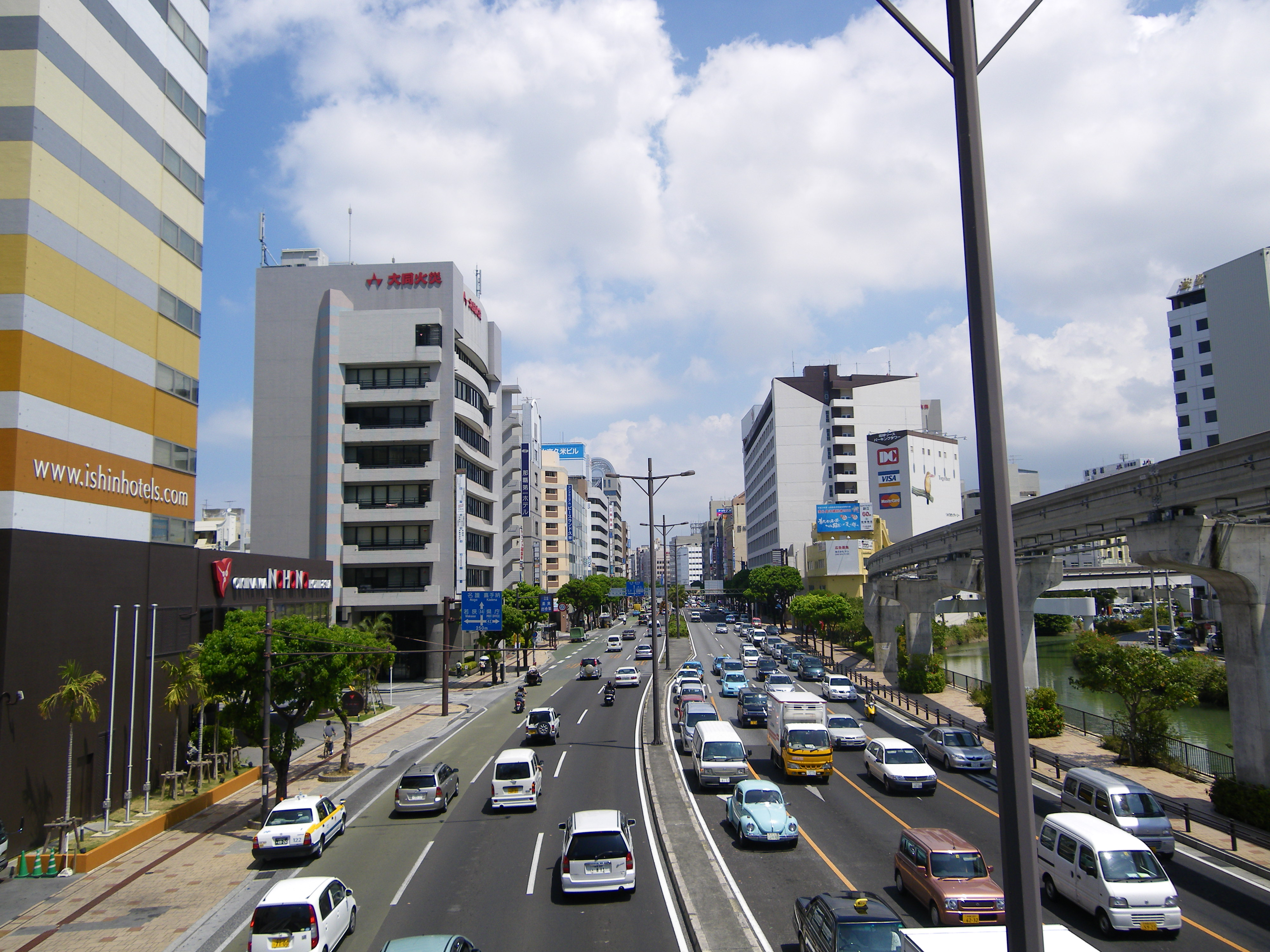
National Route 58 in Naha City

=== Air ===
Naha Airport and Naha Port serve the city. Naha Airport is the hub of Okinawa Prefecture.

=== Train ===
The Okinawa Urban Monorail, also known as the Yui Rail (ゆいレール) carries passengers from Naha Airport Station to the center of Naha, Kokusai-dōri, Shintoshin, Shuri, and to the terminal at Tedako-Uranishi Station in Urasoe.

=== Ferry ===
The Tomari wharf in Naha connects the main Okinawa island to the rest of the islands around it. Notably it connect to the main land via the a daily ferry to Kagoshima, but also many smaller one to get to the Kerama islands (such as Tokashiki, Aka and Zamami)

== Sports ==
Naha co-hosted the 2025 U-18 Baseball World Cup with Itoman, Okinawa.

== Twin towns and cities ==
Naha is twinned with the following locations.

- Fuzhou, China since 1981
- Honolulu, United States since 1961
- Kawasaki, Kanagawa since 1996
- Nichinan, Miyazaki since 1969
- São Vicente, Brazil since 1978
- São Paulo, Brazil

== Notable people ==
People with links to the city of Naha include:

- Yui Aragaki, singer, actor, model
- Awich, (Akiko Urasaki) Okinawan hip hop artist
- Namie Amuro, pop singer
- Kurara Chibana, actress, model, Miss Universe Japan 2006 and first runner-up at Miss Universe 2006
- Cocco, singer
- Gichin Funakoshi, karate practitioner
- Eriko Imai, pop singer, actor and politician; member of Speed
- Satoko Ishimine, pop singer
- Kazuki Ganaha, football (soccer) player
- Ryoma Henzan, racing driver
- Kanryō Higaonna, martial artist
- Morio Higaonna, karate practitioner
- Ankō Itosu, karate practitioner
- Kobashigawa Eishō, potter
- Sōkon Matsumura, karate practitioner
- Chōjun Miyagi, martial artist who founded the Gōjū-ryū school of karate
- Fumi Nikaidō, actor and model
- Orange Range, alternative rock band. All members are from Okinawa
- Dave Roberts (outfielder), major league baseball player and manager
- Mitsutoshi Shimabukuro, manga artist and author of Toriko
- Mikiko Shiroma, politician, mayor of Naha 2014 – 2022
- Norihiro Yagi, manga artist and author of Claymore
- Sho Yonashiro, singer, member of JO1

== In popular media ==
- Naha City was prominently featured in the plot of the 1986 film The Karate Kid Part II. However, the film was actually shot in Hawaii.
- The opening scene of David Mitchell's 1999 novel Ghostwritten is set in Naha.
- The name Naha was used in Microsoft's 2003 space simulation game Freelancer. The Gas Miner "Naha" is a station owned by the Gas Miners Guild (GMG) in the Sigma-13 system.
- Shuri Castle during the American invasion was recreated in Call of Duty: World at War (2008) during the final stages of the game. The player must help capture the castle and it is the final level for the American portion of the story.
- Portions of Naha have been faithfully recreated in 3D for Sega's Ryu ga Gotoku 3, or Yakuza 3 in its North American localization, a 2009 video game on PlayStation 3. This virtual version includes Kokusai-dōri, the covered Heiwa-dōri Shopping Arcade, Makishi Public Market and the Monorail's Prefectural Office Station. It also features many of the district's real-life eateries and businesses as tie-ins.
- Anthony Bourdain: Parts Unknown visits Okinawa in season 6, episode 3, to sample the unique Okinawan chanpurū cuisine and learn about the history of Karate.
- PBS series Family Ingredients filmed two episodes in Naha and Okinawa at Shuri Castle and Makishi Market in 2016.
- Karate Kid spin-off Cobra Kai, filmed Season 3, Episodes 4 and 5, "The Right Path" and "Miyagi-Do", in Naha and other parts of Okinawa Island, filming at Naha Airport, Yanbaru National Park, and the Mutabaru Observatory at the abandoned Shah Bay resort in Ogimi.

== Sources ==
- Ooshiro, Sally. Irosetsuden, thesis translation of ancient Ryūkyū record compilation. Submitted to University of Hawaii, 1964.
