= Naha Airport Station =

Monorail station in Naha, Okinawa Prefecture, Japan

Coordinates: 26.206852°N 127.652249°E

Naha Airport Station 那覇空港駅
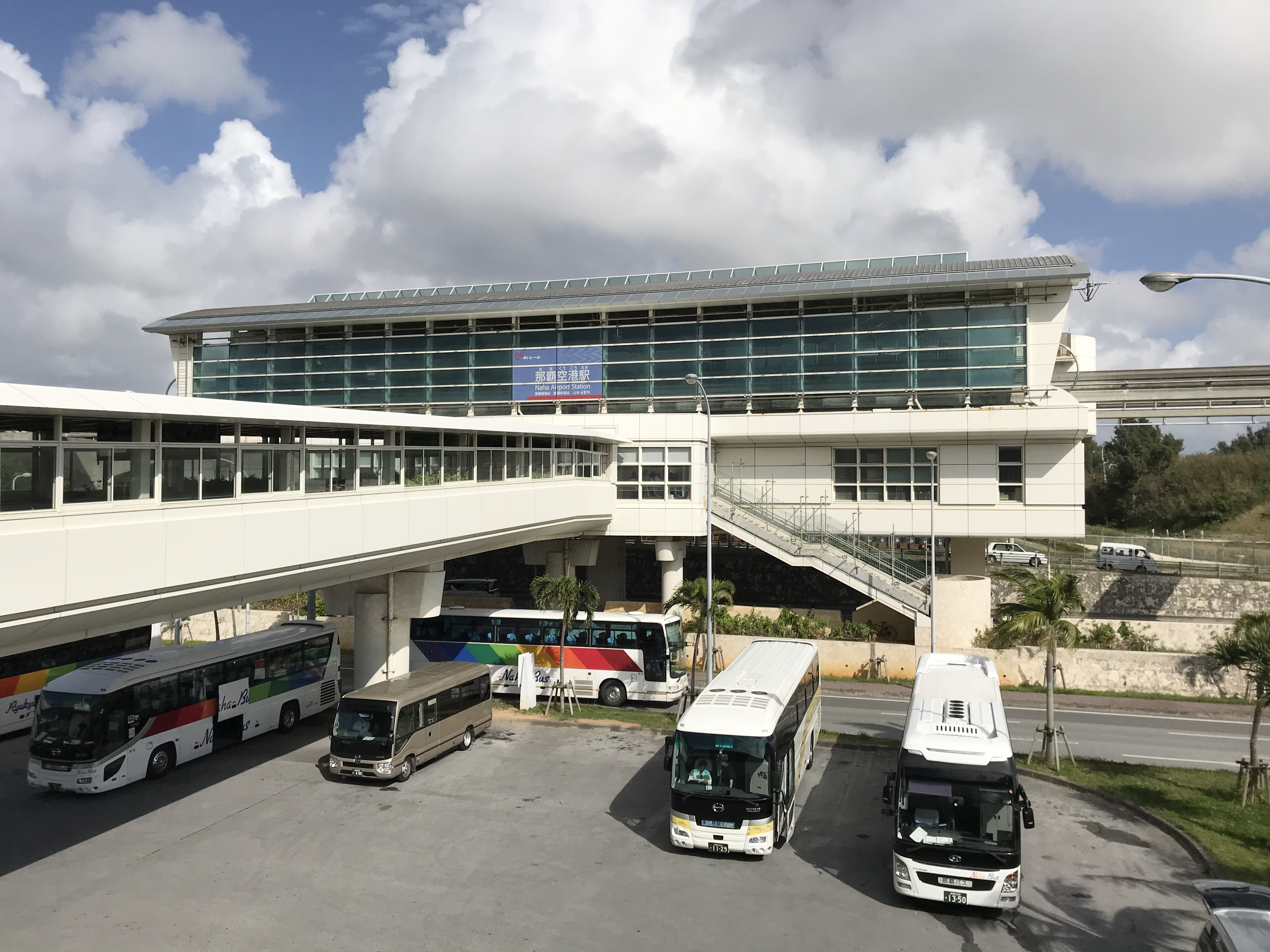
- Naha Airport Station building in February, 2020

General information
- Location: Kagamizu, Naha, Okinawa; Japan
- Operator: Okinawa Urban Monorail
- Line: ■ Okinawa Urban Monorail Line
- Tracks: 2
- Connections: Naha Airport

Construction
- Structure type: Elevated
- Accessible: Yes

Other information
- Station code: 1

History
- Opened: 10 August 2003

Services
| Preceding station | Okinawa Urban Monorail | Following station |
|---|---|---|
| Terminus | Yui Rail | Akamine towards Tedako-Uranishi |
Location
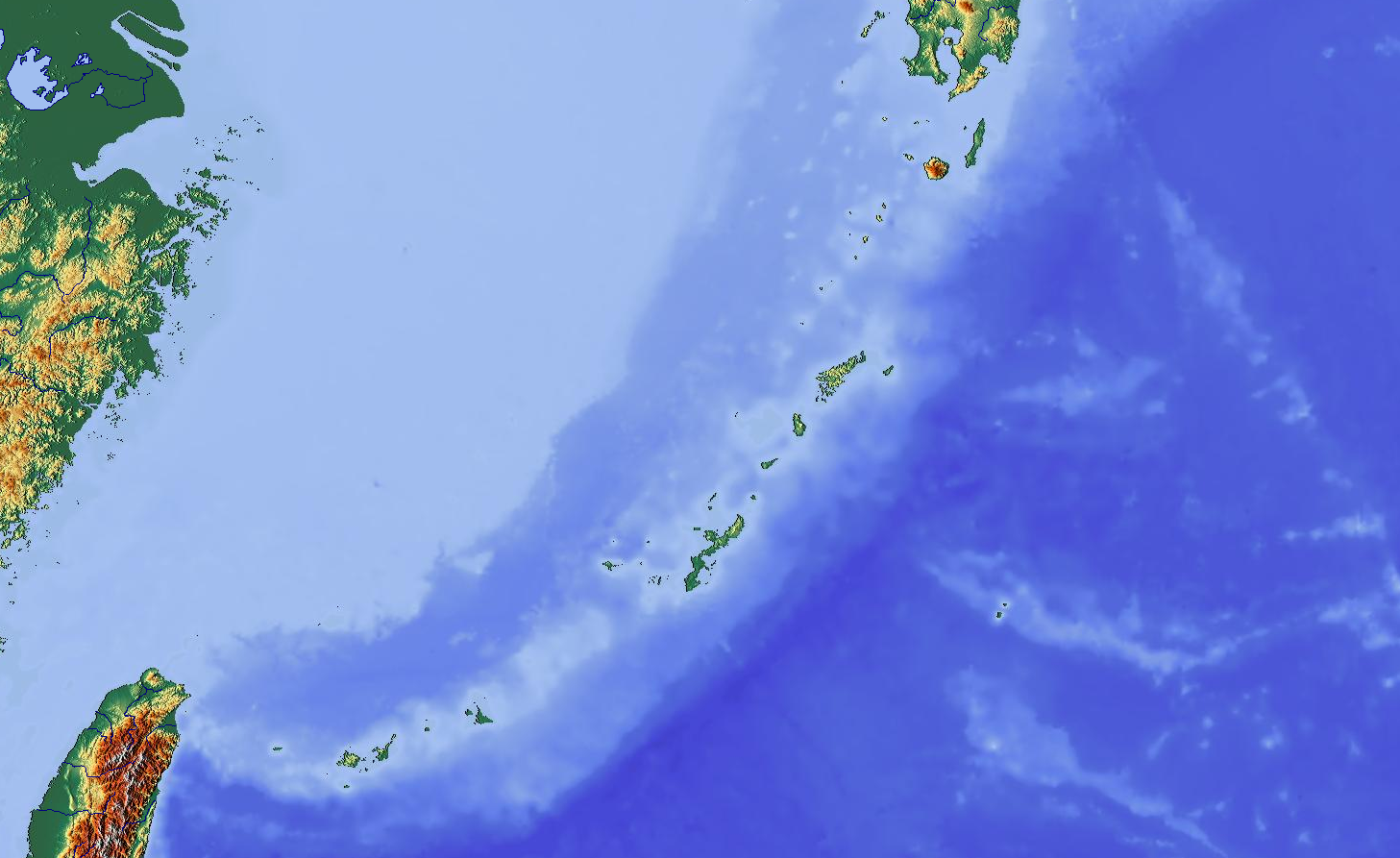
- Location within Ryukyu Islands Location within Japan

Naha Airport Station (那覇空港駅, Naha-kūkō-eki) is a railway station on the Okinawa Urban Monorail (Yui Rail) in Naha, Okinawa, Japan. It is the western terminus of the line. It is also the westernmost station in Japan, and the southernmost airport station in the country.

The station has two platforms, though platform 2 is for the most part only used during rush hour. The station is connected directly to the second floor of Naha Airport via an elevated pedestrian bridge with a moving walkway.

The station opened on 10 August 2003. A plaque officially marking it as the westernmost station in the country was unveiled on 12 July the following year. The traditional Okinawan folksong "Tanchamee" (谷茶前) is used as the chime to announce the arrival and departure of trains.

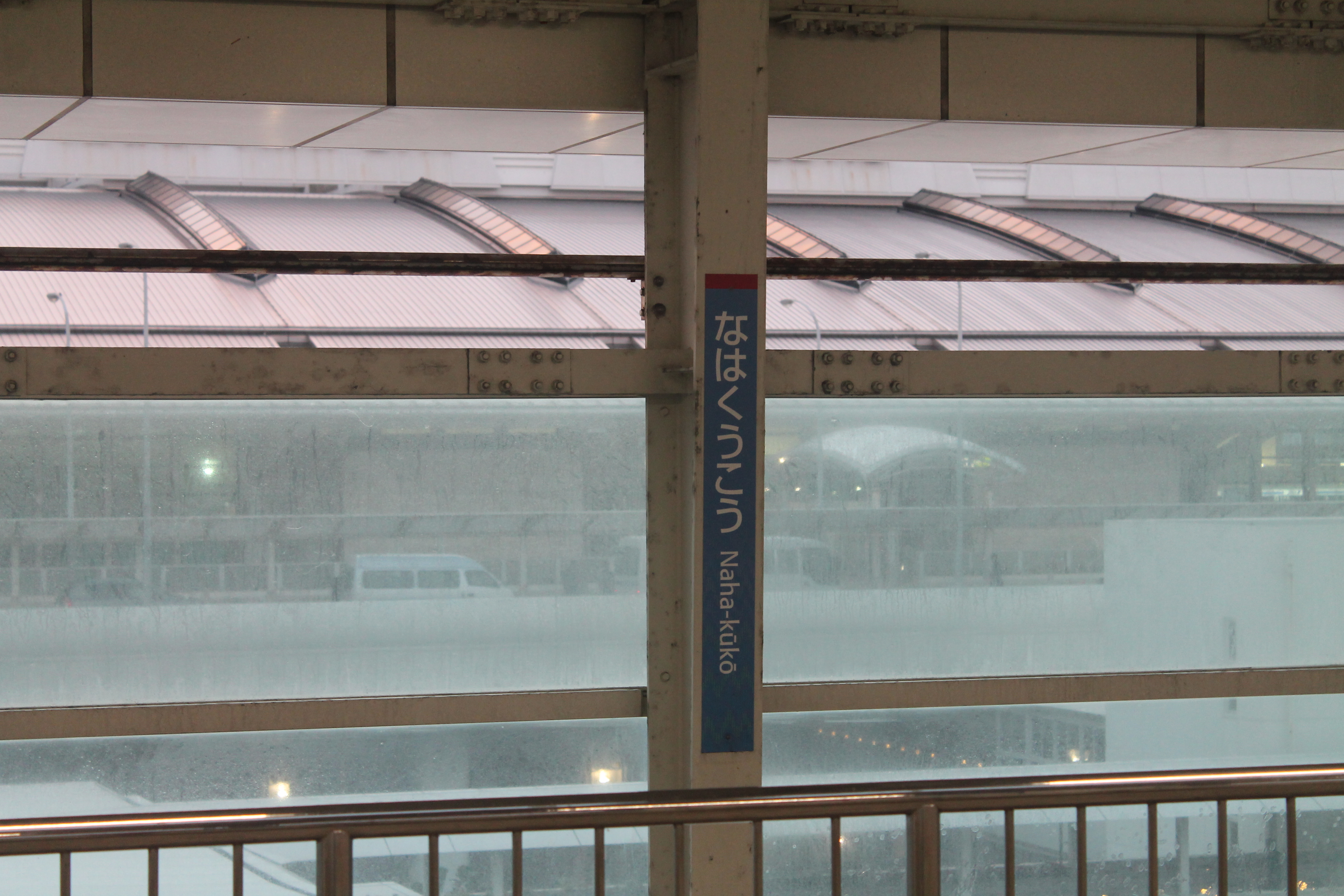
Station sign

== Lines ==
- Okinawa Urban Monorail

== Layout ==
The station consists of one elevated island platform serving two tracks.

=== Platforms ===
| 1・2 | ■ Okinawa Urban Monorail | for Tedako-Uranishi |

== See also ==
- List of railway stations in Japan
