= Tedako-Uranishi Station =

Monorail station in Urasoe, Okinawa Prefecture, Japan

Coordinates: 26.2418°N 127.7419°E

Tedako-Uranishi Station てだこ浦西駅
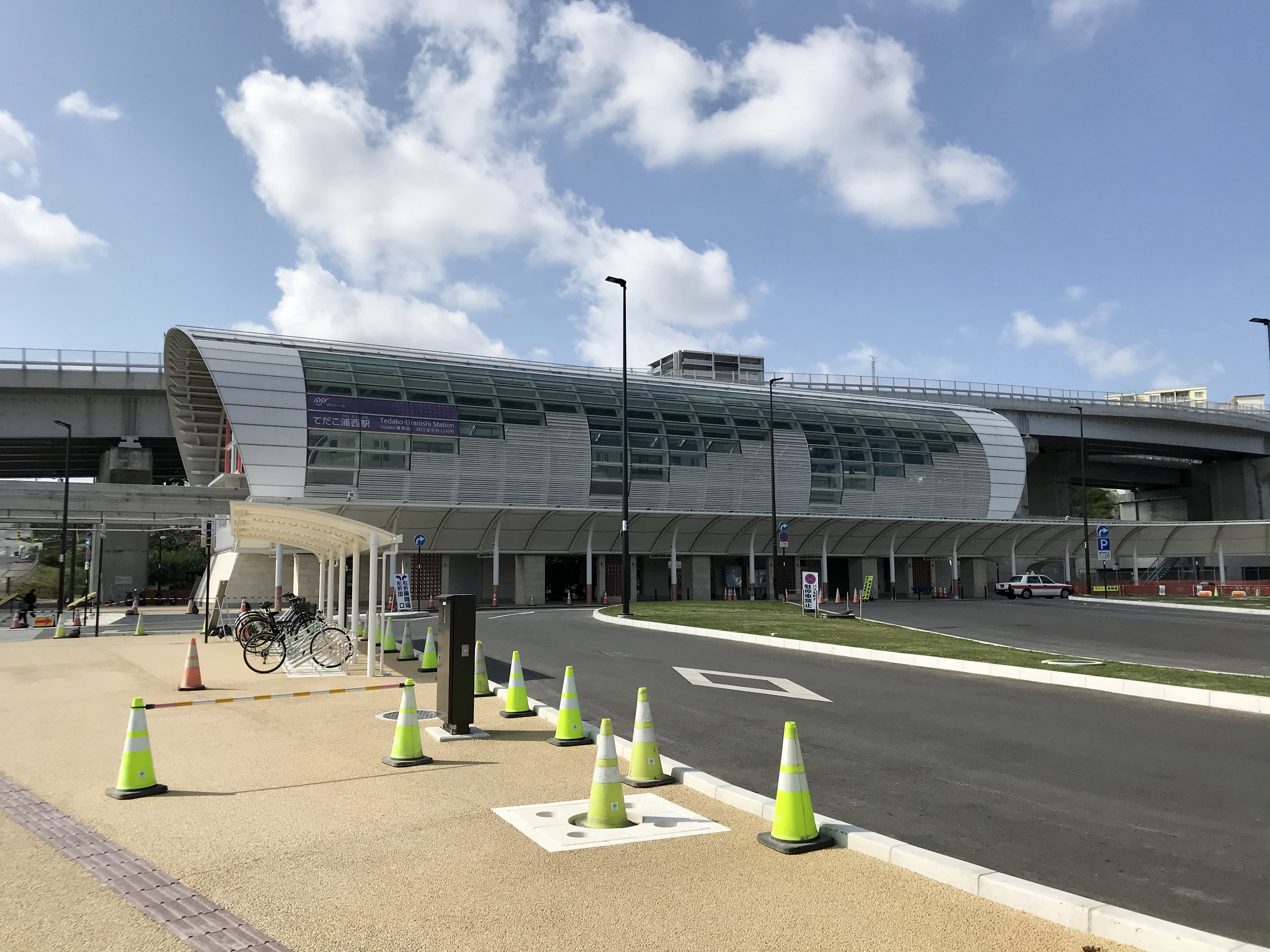
- Tedako-Uranishi Station in February 2020

General information
- Location: Urasoe, Okinawa; Japan
- Operator: Okinawa Urban Monorail
- Line: ■ Okinawa Urban Monorail Line
- Tracks: 2

Construction
- Structure type: Elevated
- Accessible: Yes

Other information
- Station code: 19

History
- Opened: October 1, 2019

Services
Preceding station	Okinawa Urban Monorail	Following station
Urasoe-Maeda towards Naha Airport	Yui Rail	Terminus
Location

Tedako-Uranishi Station (てだこ浦西駅, Tedako-Uranishi-eki) is a railway station on the Okinawa Urban Monorail (Yui Rail) in Urasoe, Okinawa Prefecture, Japan. It is the eastern terminus of the line.

== Line ==
- Okinawa Urban Monorail

== Layout ==
The station consists of one elevated island platform serving two tracks.

=== Platform ===
1・2	■ Okinawa Urban Monorail	for Naha Airport

== History ==
The station opened on October 1, 2019 as part of the new extension from Shuri.
