= List of defunct railway companies in Japan =

List of defunct railway companies in Japan lists defunct Japanese railway operators. The list includes all types of railways, such as handcars, horsecars, trams, light railways, heavy rails, freight rails, industrial railways, monorails, new transit systems, or funiculars. Some companies are still active in other businesses, such as bus operation. Translated names might be tentative. "Former names" include those of preceding operators not directly related to their successors.

The list omits these types of operators:

- Type 1: Direct predecessor of surviving railway operator. (e.g. Meguro Kamata Electric Railway, the current Tokyu Corporation.)
- Type 2: Operator with lines largely succeeded by surviving railway operator. (e.g. Kaetsunō Railway, whose lines succeeded by Manyōsen.)
- Type 3: Operator that was merged by surviving railway operator, Type 1, or Type 2. (e.g. Sanyō Railway, later merged into Japanese National Railways, which was later succeeded by Japan Railways Group Companies.)
- Type 4: Planned line that was never built.

== Hokkaidō ==
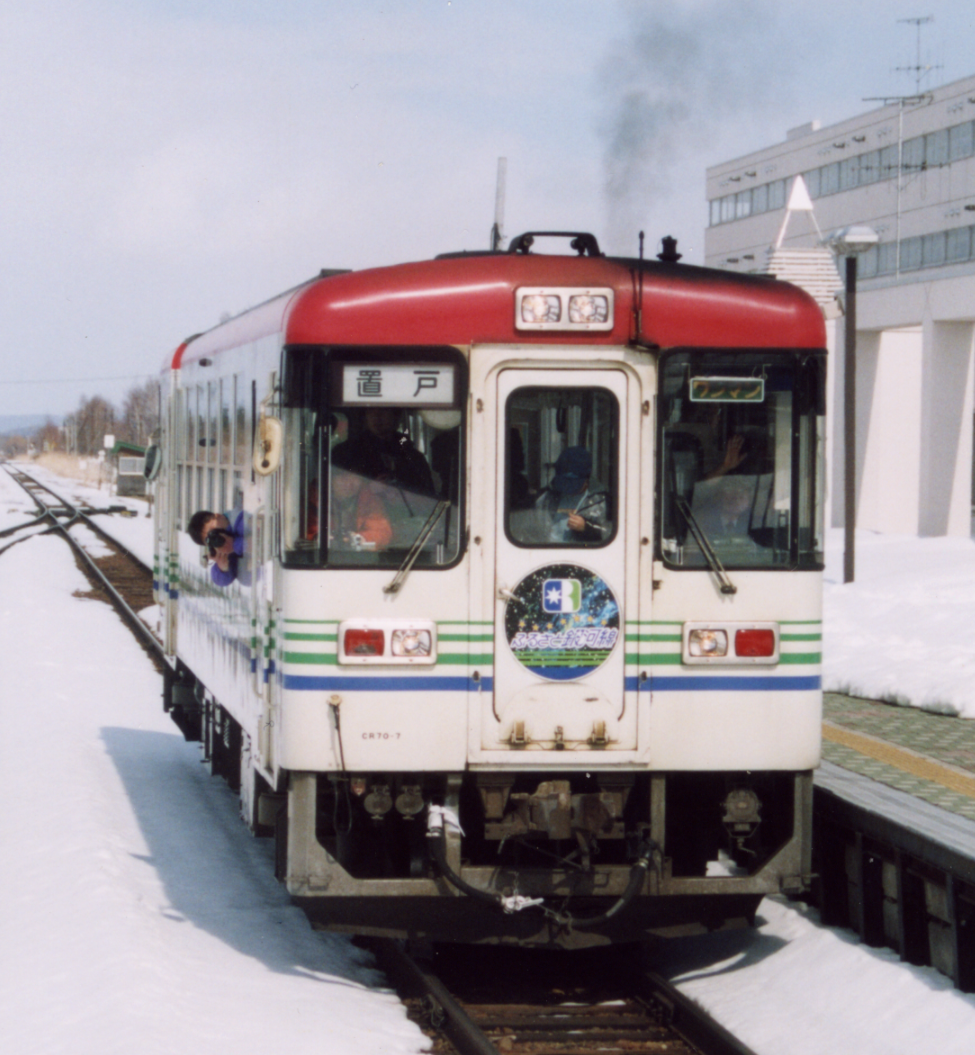
Kamitokoro Station, Hokkaidō Chihoku Kōgen Railway Line, 2006.

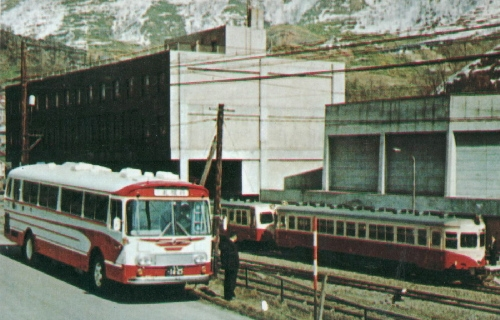
Yūbari Railway Line, presumably in the 1970s.

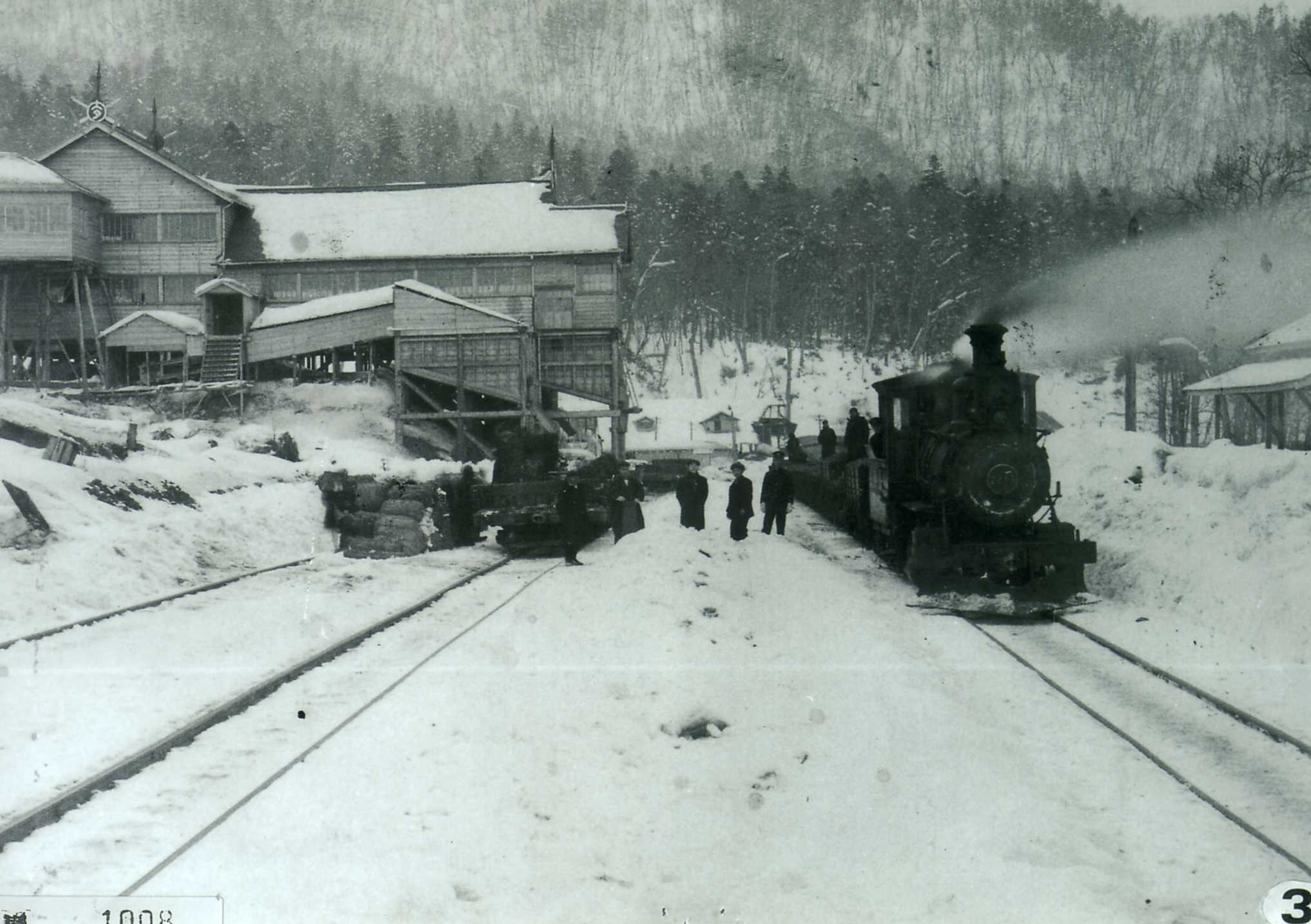
Ōyūbari Coal Mine Industrial Railway Line, 1912.

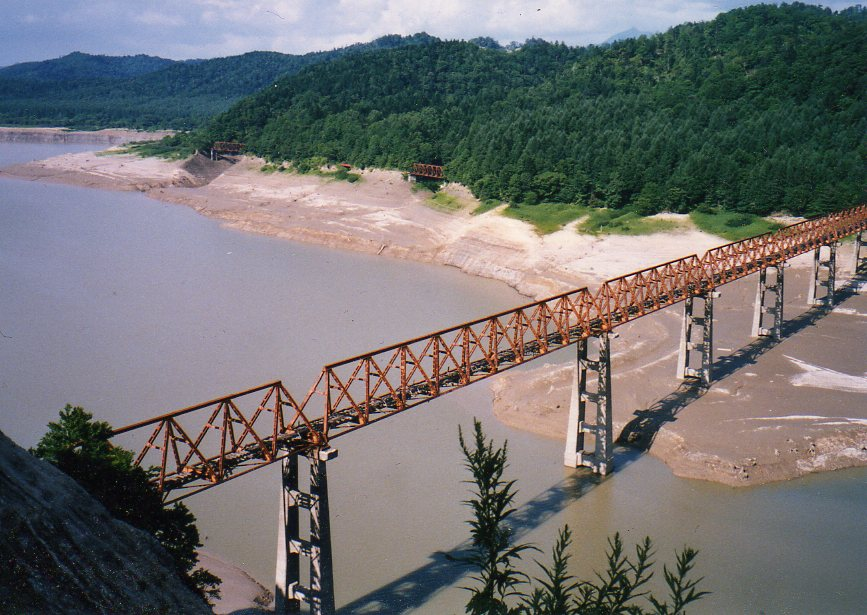
Abandoned bridge of Ōyūbari Forest Railway.

- Abashiri Kōtsū 網走交通
  - Formerly called Higashi-Mokoto Transportation 東藻琴交通. Still active in bus and other businesses.
- Asahikawa City Tramway 旭川市街軌道
- Asahikawa Electric Tramway 旭川電気軌道
- Ashibetsu Forest Railway 芦別森林鉄道 (Industrial railway)
- Bekkai Municipal Tramway 別海村営軌道
- Bifuka Municipal Tramway 美深町営軌道
- Ebetsu Municipal Handcar Tramway 江別町営人車軌道
- Forest Railway in Mikasa (Operator name unknown) 森林鉄道 (Industrial railway)
- Garuishi Tramway 軽石軌道
- Haboro Colliery Railway 羽幌炭礦鉄道
- Haboro Forest Railway 羽幌森林鉄道 (Industrial railway)
- Hamanaka Municipal Tramway 浜中町営軌道
- Hayakita Railway 早来鉄道
  - Formerly called Hayakita Tramway 早来軌道. Still active as Atsuma Bus あつまバス, a bus operator.
- Hokkaidō Chihoku Kōgen Railway 北海道ちほく高原鉄道
- Hokkaidō Colliery and Steamship 北海道炭礦汽船
  - Formerly called Yūbari Railway 夕張鉄道. Hokkaidō Colliery and Steamship is still active as a chemical importer. Yūbari Railway is still active as a bus operator.
- Hokkaidō Takushoku Railway 北海道拓殖鉄道
  - Still active as a truck company.
- Horonobe Municipal Tramway 幌延町営軌道
- Iwanai Horsecar 岩内馬車鉄道
- Jōzankei Forest Railway 定山渓森林鉄道 (Industrial railway)
- Jōzankei Railway 定山渓鉄道
  - Still active as Jōtetsu じょうてつ, a bus operator.
- Kakuta Coal Mine Industrial Railway 角田炭礦専用鉄道 (Industrial railway)
- Kamikawa Horsecar 上川馬車鉄道
- Kayanuma Colliery Tramway 茅沼炭鉱軌道
  - Opened in 1869, presumed to be the oldest railway in Japan.
- Kitami Railway 北見鉄道
- Kōtō Tramway 江当軌道
- Kushiro Development Pier 釧路開発埠頭
  - Former names include Hokkaidō Colliery Railway 北海道炭礦鉄道, Yūbetsu Colliery Railway 雄別炭礦鉄道, Yūbetsu Railway 雄別鉄道, and Yūbetsu Coal Mine 雄別炭礦.
- Kushiro Railway 釧路鉄道
- Maruseppu Forest Railway 丸瀬布森林鉄道 (Industrial railway)
- Mitsubishi Coal Mining 三菱石炭鉱業
  - Former names include Ōyūbari Coal Mine 大夕張炭礦, Bibai Railway 美唄鉄道, Mitsubishi Mining 三菱鉱業, and Mitsubishi Ōyūbari Coal Mine 三菱大夕張炭礦. Mitsubishi Mining was later merged into Mitsubishi Material 三菱マテリアル.
- Mitsui Ashibetsu Railway 三井芦別鉄道
- Mitsui Mining 三井鉱山
  - Still active in its main business.
- Nemuro Takushoku Railway 根室拓殖鉄道
- Nippon Soda 日本曹達 (Industrial railway)
  - Still active in its main business as a chemical company.
- Noboribetsu Onsen Tramway 登別温泉軌道
- Oketo Forest Railway 置戸森林鉄道 (Industrial railway)
- Onneyu Forest Railway 温根湯森林鉄道 (Industrial railway)
- Ōnuma Electric Railway 大沼電鉄
- Ōyūbari Forest Office 大夕張営林署 (Industrial railway)
- Rumoi Railway 留萠鉄道
- Sapporo Suburban Electric Tramway 札幌郊外電気軌道
  - Formerly called Sapporo Onsen Electric Tramway 札幌温泉電気軌道.
- Sapporo Tramway 札幌軌道
- Saru Railway 沙流鉄道
- Shibecha Municipal Tramway 標茶町営軌道
- Shibetsu Tramway 士別軌道
  - Still active as a bus operator.
- Suttsu Railway 寿都鉄道
- Teshio Colliery Railway 天塩炭砿鉄道
  - Still active as Tentesu Bus てんてつバス, a bus operator.
- Tōbetsu Municipal Tramway 当別町営軌道
- Tomakomai Port Development 苫小牧港開発
  - Still active as a developer.
- Tōyako Electric Railway 洞爺湖電気鉄道
- Tsurui Municipal Tramway 鶴居村営軌道
- Utanobori Municipal Tramway 歌登町営軌道
- Yoichi Rinkō Tramway 余市臨港軌道
- Yūbetsu Tramway 湧別軌道

== Tōhoku region ==
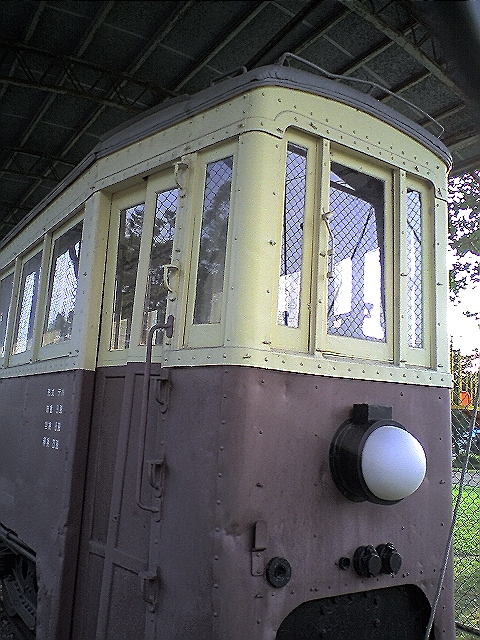
"Horse Face Train" of Hanamaki Electric Railway, preserved at a park.

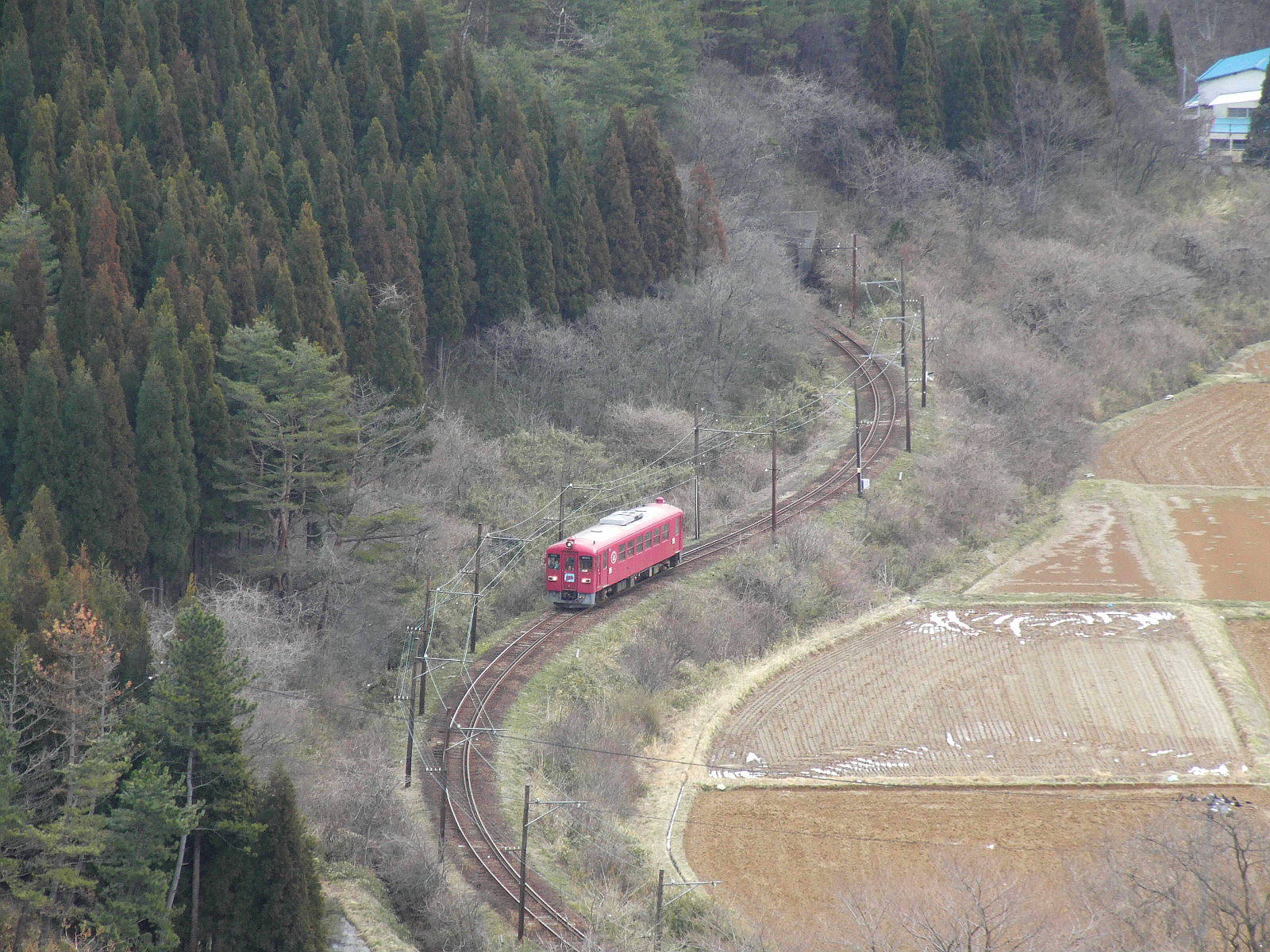
Kurihara Den'en Railway Line, 2006.

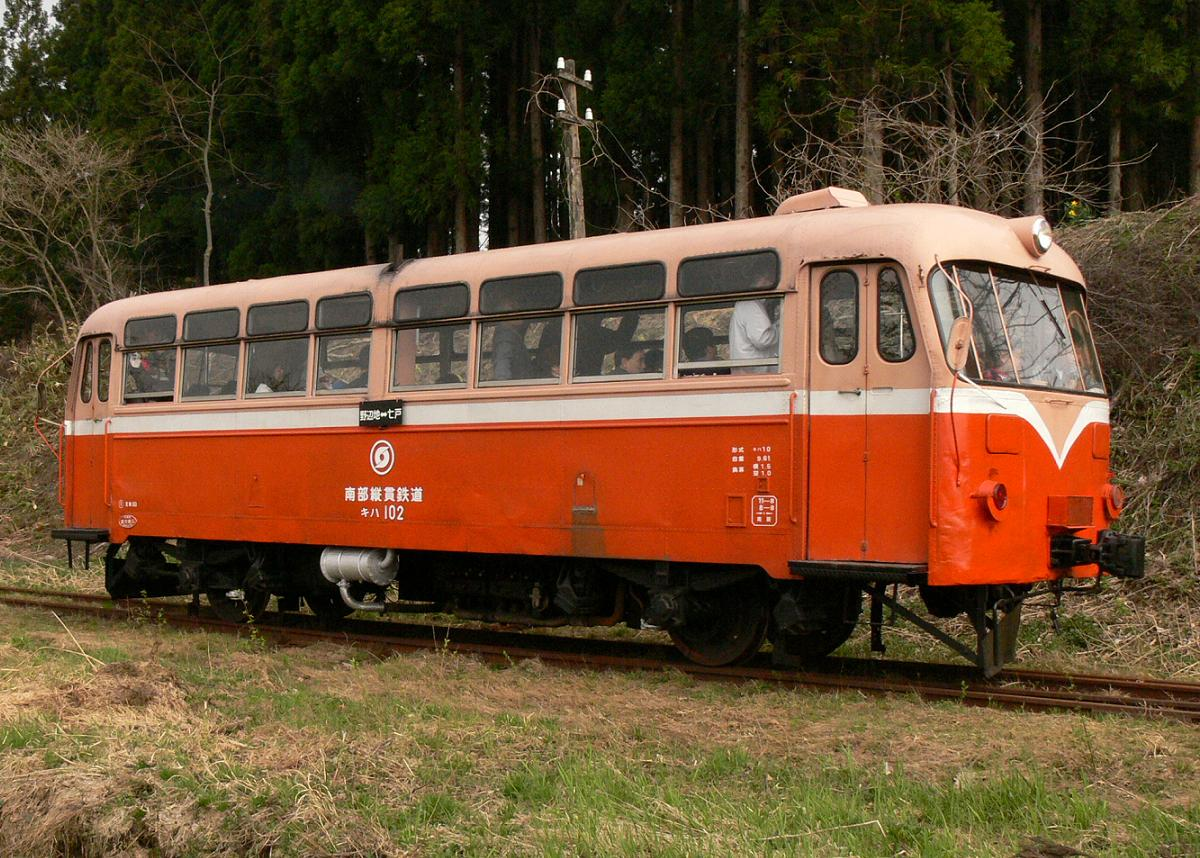
Railbus of Nanbu Jūkan Railway Line, at the revival event, 2006.

=== Aomori Prefecture ===
- Aomori Prefecture 青森県
- Kawauchi Forest Railway 川内森林鉄道 (Industrial railway)
- Nanbu Jūkan Railway 南部縦貫鉄道
  - Still active as Nanbu Jūkan 南部縦貫, a taxi company.
- Nanbu Railway 南部鉄道
  - Still active as Nanbu Bus 南部バス, a bus operator.
- Ōhata Forest Railway 大畑森林鉄道 (Industrial railway)
- Shimokita Kōtsū 下北交通
  - Still active as a bus operator.
- Tanabe Transport Tramway 田名部運輸軌道
  - Formerly called Tanabe Tramway 田名部軌道
- Tsugaru Forest Railway 津軽森林鉄道 (Industrial railway)

=== Iwate Prefecture ===
- Ganpoku Tramway 岩北軌道
- Iwate Chūō Bus 岩手中央バス
  - Former names include Hanamaki Electric Tramway 花巻電気軌道, Hanamaki Electric Company 花巻電気, Morioka Electric Industry 盛岡電気工業, Hanamaki Onsen Electric Railway 花巻温泉電気鉄道/花巻温泉電鉄, Hanamaki Electric Railway 花巻電気鉄道/花巻電鉄. Later merged into Iwateken Kōtsū 岩手県交通, a bus operator.
- Japan Iron & Steel 日本製鐵
  - Former names include Kamaishi Mine Horsecar 釜石鉱山馬車鉄道, Kamaishi Mine Railway 釜石鉱山鉄道, Tanaka Mine 田中鉱山, Kamaishi Mine 釜石鉱山, and Nittetsu Mining 日鉄鉱業. The last company is still active in its main business.
- Matsuo Mining Railway 松尾鉱業鉄道
- Mizusawa Forest Railway 水沢森林鉄道 (Industrial railway)
- Tankō Tramway 胆江軌道
- Waga Light Tramway 和賀軽便軌道

=== Miyagi Prefecture ===
- Furukawa Horsecar 古川馬車鉄道
- Kakuda Tramway 角田軌道
  - Formerly called Kakuda Horsecar 角田馬車軌道.
- Kurihara Den'en Railway くりはら田園鉄道線
- Miyagi Bus 宮城バス
  - Former names include Sendai Tramway 仙台軌道, Sendai Railway 仙台鉄道, Senpoku Railway 仙北鉄道, Kinkazan Tramway 金華山軌道, Ojika Tramway 牡鹿軌道, Kinkazan Jidōsha 金華山自動車, and Matsuyama Handcar Tramway 松山人車軌道. Later merged into Miyagi Transportation 宮城交通, a bus operator.
- Sennan Kōtsū 仙南交通
  - Former names include Sennan Tramway 仙南軌道, Jōnan Tramway 城南軌道, Sennan Onsen Tramway 仙南温泉軌道, Sennan Kōtsū Jidōsha 仙南交通自動車, Akiu Stone Tramway 秋保石材軌道, Akiu Stone Electric Tramway 秋保石材電気軌道, Akiu Electric Tramway 秋保電気軌道, and Akiu Electric Railway 秋保電気鉄道. Later merged into Miyagi Transportation.
- Zōtō Tramway 増東軌道
  - Later merged into Sendai City Transportation Bureau 仙台市交通局.

=== Akita Prefecture ===
- Akita Chūō Kōtsū 秋田中央交通
  - Still active as a bus operator.
- Akita City Transportation Bureau 秋田市交通局
- Dōwa Kōgyō 同和鉱業
  - Still active as Dōwa Holdings DOWAホールディングス in its main business, a metal company.
- Jōgi Forest Railway 定義森林鉄道 (Industrial railway)
- Nagakisawa Forest Railway 長木沢森林鉄道 (Industrial railway)
- Nakanishi Tokugorō Operated Tramway 中西徳五郎経営軌道
- Nibetsu Forest Railway 仁別森林鉄道 (Industrial railway)
- Sugisawa Forest Railway 杉沢森林鉄道 (Industrial railway)
- Takanosu Forest Railway 鷹巣森林鉄道 (Industrial railway)
- Ugo Kōtsū 羽後交通
  - Former names include Ogachi Railway 雄勝鉄道, and Yokote Railway 横手鉄道. Still active as a bus operator.

=== Yamagata Prefecture ===
- Akayu Handcar Tramway 赤湯人車軌道
- Shōnai Kōtsū 庄内交通
  - Still active as a bus operator.
- Yachi Tramway 谷地軌道
- Yamagata Kōtsū 山形交通
  - Former names include Takahata Railway 高畠鉄道, Sanzan Electric Tramway 三山電気鉄道, and Obanazawa Railway 尾花沢鉄道. Still active as Yamakō ヤマコー, a bus and other operator.

=== Fukushima Prefecture ===
- Akai Tramway 赤井軌道
- Bandai Kyūkō Electric Railway 磐梯急行電鉄
  - Former names include Japan Sulfur 日本硫黄, and Japan Sulfur Kankō 日本硫黄観光.
- Ena Railway 江名鉄道
- Iwaki Coal Mine 磐城炭礦
  - Still active as Jōban Kōsan 常磐興産, a resort developer.
- Iwaki Tramway 磐城軌道
- Miharu Horsecar 三春馬車鉄道
- Nakoso Tramway 勿来軌道
- Yoshima Tramway 好間軌道

== Kantō region ==
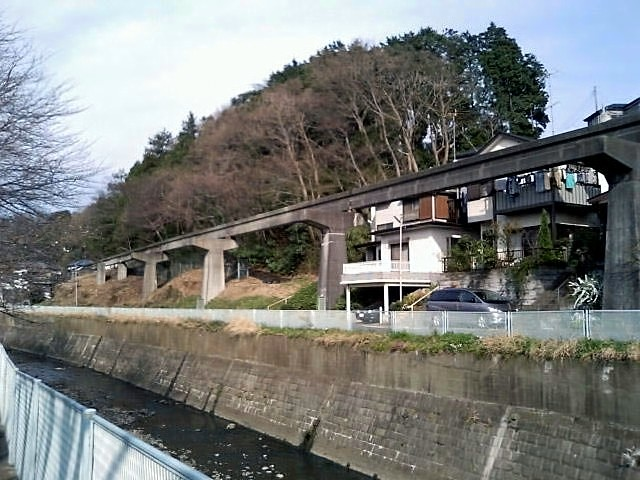
Ruins of Dream Land Monorail, Dream Kankō.

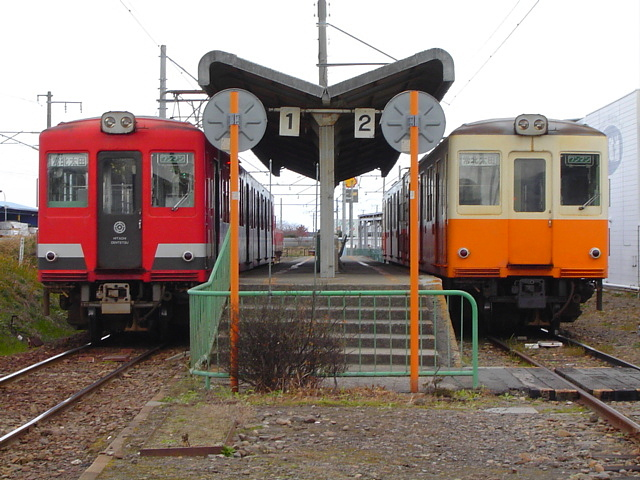
Ayukawa Station, Hitachi Dentetsu Line, 2004.

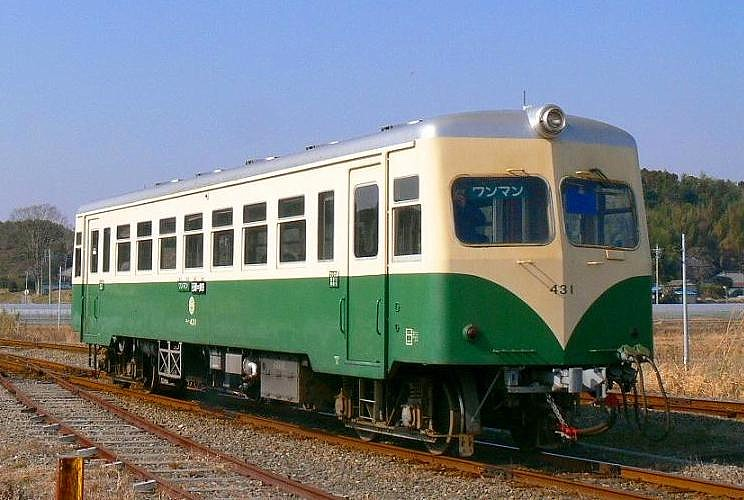
Kashima Railway Line, 2007.

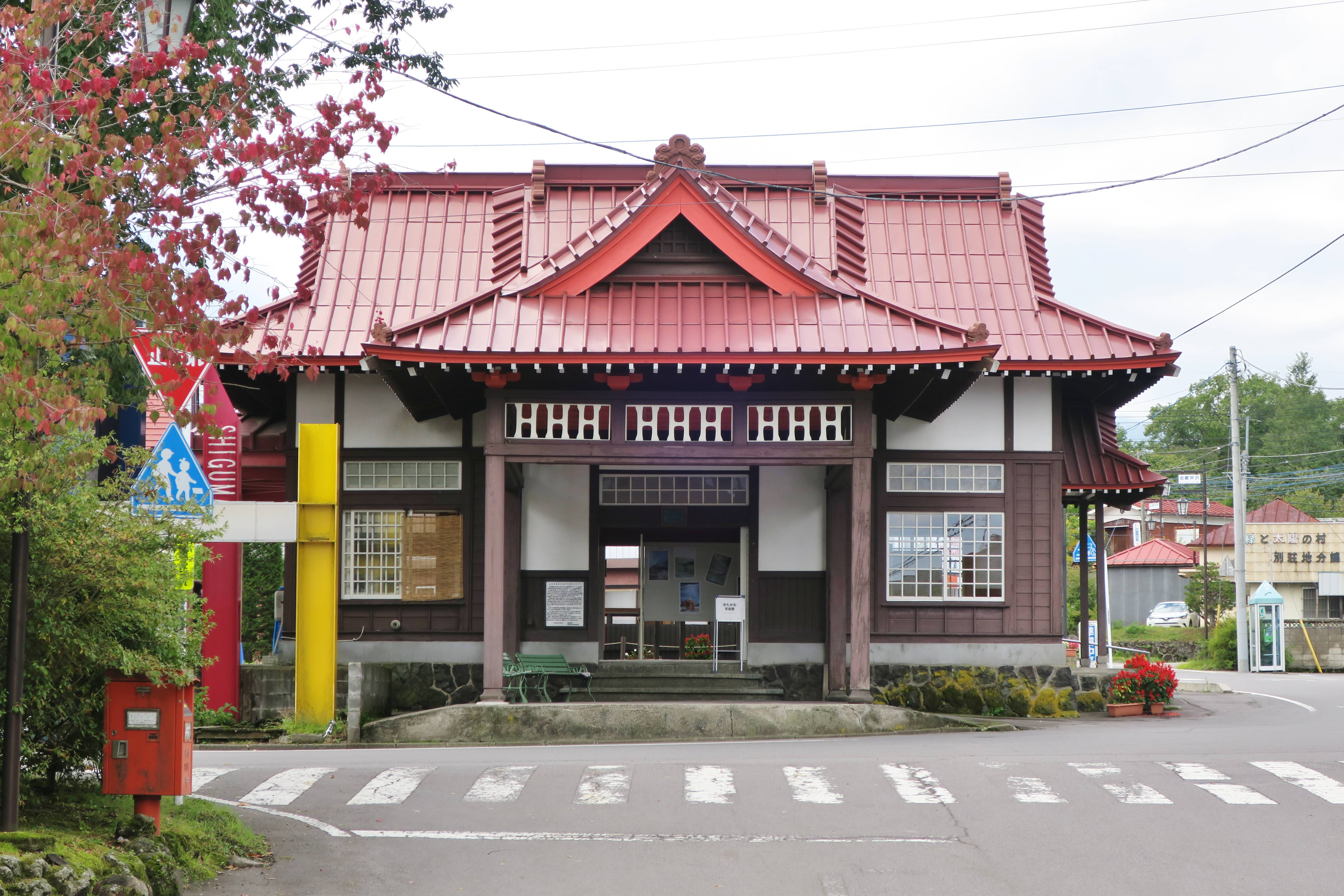
Former Kita-Karuizawa Station of Kusakaru Electric Railway.

=== Ibaraki Prefecture ===
- Haguro Tramway 羽黒軌道
- Hitachi Dentetsu 日立電鉄
  - Formerly called Jōhoku Electric Railway 常北電気鉄道. Still active as a bus operator.
- Ibaraki Tramway 茨城軌道
- Inada Handcar Tramway 稲田人車軌道
- Iwama Handcar Tramway 岩間人車軌道
- Jōnan Electric Railway 常南電気鉄道
- Kabaho Kōgyō 樺穂興業
- Kasama Inari Transport 笠間稲荷運輸
- Kashima Railway 鹿島鉄道
  - Formerly called Kashima Sangū Railway 鹿島参宮鉄道.
- Kashima Tramway 鹿島軌道
- Mito Electric Railway 水戸電気鉄道
- Muramatsu Tramway 村松軌道
- Tsukuba Railway 筑波鉄道
  - Formerly called Jōsō Tsukuba Railway 常総筑波鉄道. Still active as Kantetsu Tsukuba Shōji 関鉄筑波商事, a golf practice range company.

=== Tochigi Prefecture ===
- Akami Railway 赤見鉄道
  - Formerly called Akami Light Railway 赤見軽便鉄道.
- Imperial Japanese Army 大日本帝国陸軍 (Industrial railway)
- Iwafune Handcar Railway 岩舟人車鉄道
- Kitsuregawa Handcar Tramway 喜連川人車軌道
  - Formerly called Kitsuregawa Handcar Railway 喜連川人車鉄道.
- Nabeyama Tramway 鍋山軌道
  - Formerly called Nabeyama Handcar Tramway 鍋山人車軌道.
- Nasu Tramway 那須軌道
  - Formerly called Nasu Handcar Tramway 那須人車軌道.
- Otome Handcar Tramway 乙女人車軌道
- Shiobara Electric Railway 塩原電車
  - Formerly called Shiobara Tramway 塩原軌道.
- Tōya Railway 東野鉄道
  - Still active as Tōya Kōtsū 東野交通, a bus operator.

=== Gunma Prefecture ===
- Ikaho Cable Railway 伊香保ケーブル鉄道
  - Formerly called Kantō Cable Railway 関東鋼索鉄道.
- Iwahana Light Railway 岩鼻軽便鉄道
- Kusakaru Electric Railway 草軽電気鉄道
  - Former names include Kusakaru Light Railway 草津軽便鉄道, and Kusatsu Electric Railway 草津電気鉄道. Still active as Kusakaru Kōtsū 草軽交通, a bus operator.
- Midorino Horsecar 緑野馬車鉄道
- Satomi Tramway 里見軌道
- Tokyo Light 東京電燈
  - Formerly called Agatsuma Onsen Horsecar 吾妻温泉馬車鉄道, Tone Tramway 利根軌道, Agatsuma Tramway 吾妻軌道, Gunma Electric Power Company 群馬電力, and Tokyo Electric Power Company 東京電力. The last company is different from the current company with the same name.
- Usui Horsecar 碓氷馬車鉄道

=== Saitama Prefecture ===
- Bushū Nakatsugawa Forest Railway 武州中津川森林鉄道 (Industrial railway)
- Bushū Railway 武州鉄道
  - Former names include Chūō Light Electric Railway 中央軽便電気鉄道, and Chūō Railway 中央鉄道.
- Chichibu Mining 秩父鉱業 (Industrial railway)
  - Still active as Taiheiyō Cement 太平洋セメント in its main business.
- Chūbu Horsecar 中武馬車鉄道
- Gyōda Horsecar 行田馬車鉄道
- Honjō Electric Tramway 本庄電気軌道
- Irikawa Forest Railway 入川森林鉄道 (Industrial railway)
- Iruma Horsecar 入間馬車鉄道
- Jōbu Railway 上武鉄道
  - Formerly called Japan Nickel 日本ニッケル. Japan Nickel is still active as Asahi Industries 朝日工業, a chemical company.
- Senju Horsecar 千住馬車鉄道
- Sōka Horsecar 草加馬車鉄道
- University of Tokyo 東京大学 (Industrial railway)
  - Still active in its main operation.

=== Chiba Prefecture ===
- Imperial Japanese Army 大日本帝国陸軍 (Railway for tactical practice)
- Isumi Tramway 夷隅軌道
- Kujūkuri Railway 九十九里鉄道
  - Formerly called Kujūkuri Tramway 九十九里軌道. Still active as a bus operator.
- Nansō Railway 南総鉄道
- Narita Railway 成田鉄道
  - Former names include Chiba Prefectural Railway 千葉県営鉄道, Seisō Electric Tramway 成宗電気軌道, and Narita Electric Tramway 成田電気軌道. Still active as Chiba Kōtsū 千葉交通, a bus operator.

=== Tokyo Metropolis ===
- Okutama Kōgyō 奥多摩工業 (Industrial railway)
  - Still active in its main business as a limestone company.
- Senju Horsecar 千住馬車鉄道
- Sōka Horsecar 草加馬車鉄道
- Tokyo Metropolitan Government Bureau of Port and Harbor 東京都港湾局 (Industrial railway)
  - Still active in its main operation.

=== Kanagawa Prefecture ===
- Atami Tramway Organization 熱海軌道組合
  - Former names include Zusō Handcar Railway 豆相人車鉄道, Atami Railway 熱海鉄道, and Dai-Nippon Tramway 大日本軌道.
- Dream Kōtsū ドリーム交通
- Kawasaki City Transportation Bureau 川崎市交通局
  - Still active as a bus operator. Now planning a subway.
- Shōnan Tramway 湘南軌道
  - Former names include Shōnan Horsecar 湘南馬車鉄道, and Shōnan Light Railway 湘南軽便鉄道.
- Tsurumi Rinkō Railway 鶴見臨港鉄道
  - Formerly called Kaigan Electric Tramway 海岸電気軌道.

== Chūbu region ==
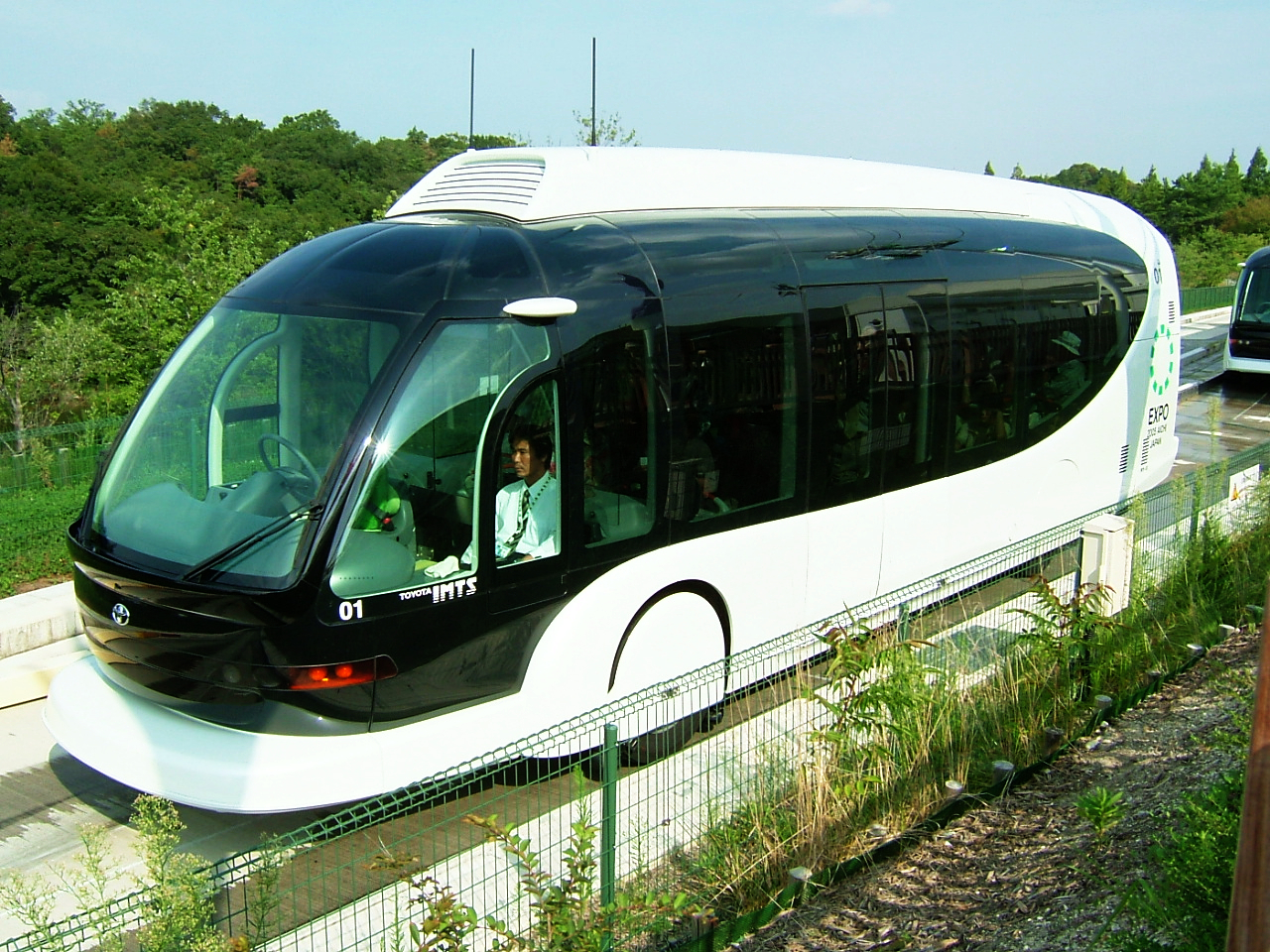
Toyota IMTS guided bus system was operated only at Expo 2005, but still was considered as a railway.

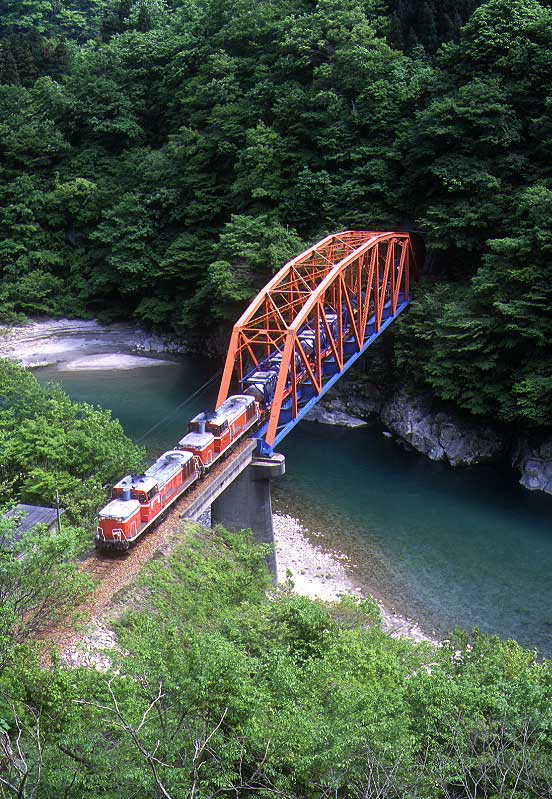
Kamioka Railway Line, 2002.

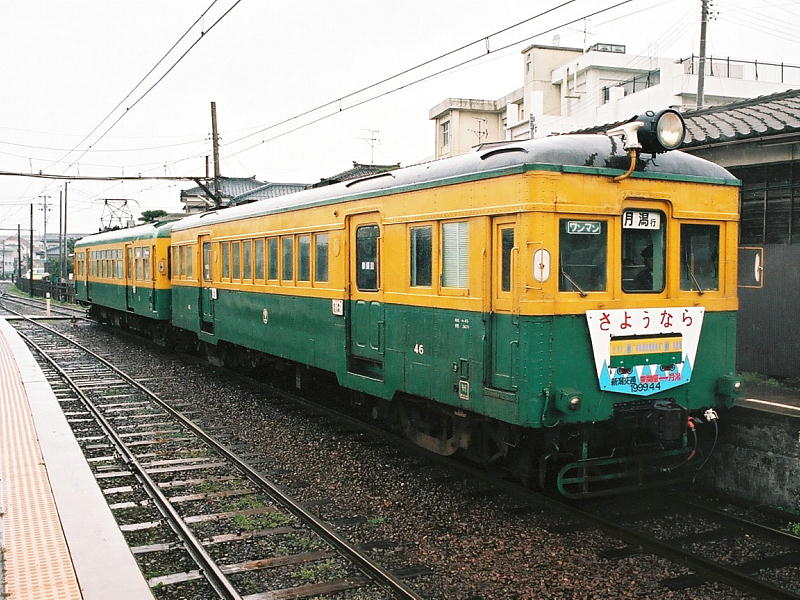
Farewell run of Niigata Kōtsū train, 1999.

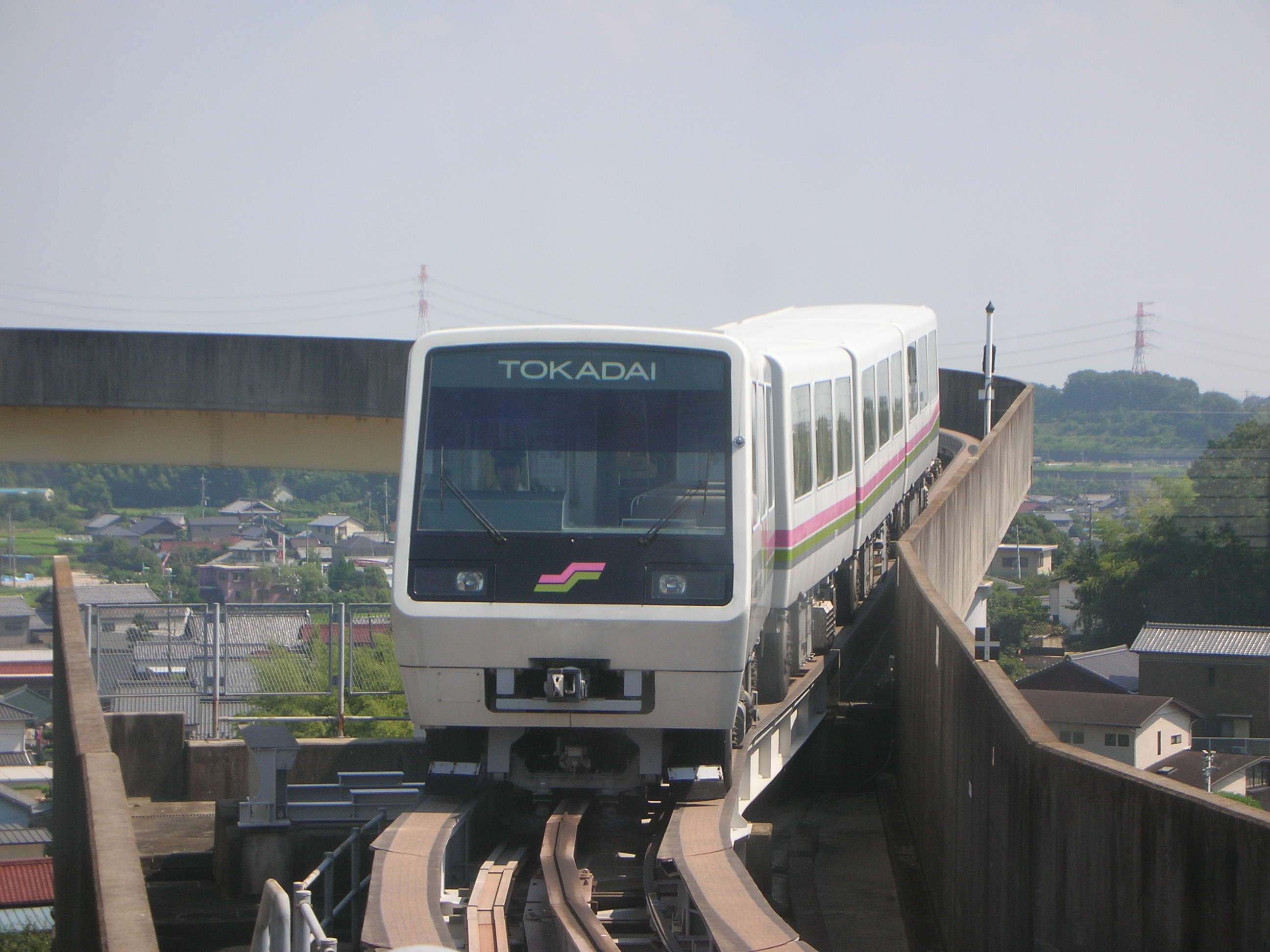
Peachliner (Tōkadai New Transit) was the first regular new transit system to be discontinued.

=== Niigata Prefecture ===
- Echigo Kōtsū 越後交通
  - Former names include Tochio Railway 栃尾鉄道, Tochio Electric Railway 栃尾鉄道, and Nagaoka Railway 長岡鉄道. Still active as a bus operator..
- Kanbara Railway 蒲原鉄道
  - Still active as a bus operator.
- Kubiki Railway and Bus 頸城鉄道自動車
  - Formerly called Kubiki Railway 頸城鉄道. Still active as Kubiki Bus 頸城自動車, a bus operator.
- Niigata Kōtsū 新潟交通
  - Former names include Nakanokuchi Electric Railway 中ノ口電気鉄道, and Niigata Electric Railway 新潟電鉄.

=== Yamanashi Prefecture ===
- Fuji Kaiyū Tramway 富士廻遊軌道
- Yamanashi Horsecar 山梨馬車鉄道
- Yamanashi Kōtsū 山梨交通
  - Former names include Yamanashi Electric Railway 山梨電気鉄道, and Kyōsai Electric Railway 峡西電気鉄道. Still active as a bus operator.

=== Nagano Prefecture ===
- Enasan Forest Railway 恵那山森林軌道 (Industrial railway)
- Ikeda Railway 池田鉄道
- Kiso Forest Railway 木曽森林鉄道 (Industrial railway)
- Kusakaru Electric Railway 草軽電気鉄道
  - Former names include Kusakaru Light Railway 草津軽便鉄道, and Kusatsu Electric Railway 草津電気鉄道. Still active as Kusakaru Kōtsū 草軽交通, a bus operator.
- Nunobiki Electric Railway 布引電気鉄道
- Usui Horsecar 碓氷馬車鉄道
- Zenkōji-Hakuba Dentetsu 善光寺白馬電鉄
  - Still active as a truck company.

=== Toyama Prefecture ===
- Kamioka Railway 神岡鉄道

=== Ishikawa Prefecture ===
- Ogoya Railway 尾小屋鉄道
  - Former names include Ogoya Mine 尾小屋鉱山, and Yokoyama Mining 横山鉱業部. Still active as Komatsu Bus 小松バス, a bus operator.

=== Fukui Prefecture ===
- Hongō Tramway 本郷軌道

=== Gifu Prefecture ===
- Enasan Forest Railway 恵那山森林軌道 (Industrial railway)
- Hichisō Forest Railway 七宗森林鉄道 (Industrial railway)
- Kitaena Railway 北恵那鉄道
  - Formerly called 大同電力 Daidō Electric Power Company. Still active as Kitaena Kōtsū 北恵那交通, a bus operator.
- Kosaka Forest Railway 小坂森林鉄道 (Industrial railway)
- Nakatsugawa Forest Railway 湯舟沢森林鉄道 (Industrial railway)
- Sakashita Forest Railway 坂下森林鉄道 (Industrial railway)
  - Formerly called Sakagawa Railway 坂川鉄道.
- Sugoroku-Kanakido Forest Railway 双六・金木戸森林鉄道 (Industrial railway)
- Tadachi Forest Railway 田立森林鉄道 (Industrial railway)
- Tōnō Railway 東濃鉄道
  - Former names include Kasahara Railway 笠原鉄道, and Dachi Railway 駄知鉄道. Still active as a bus operator.
- Tsukechi Forest Railway 付知森林鉄道 (Industrial railway)
- Yahagi Water Power 矢作水力
  - Former names include Iwamura Electric Railway 岩村電気鉄道, and Iwamura Electric Tramway 岩村電気軌道. Later merged into Chūbu Electric Power Company 中部電力.

=== Shizuoka Prefecture ===
- Abe Railway 安倍鉄道
- Atami Tramway Organization 熱海軌道組合
  - Former names include Zusō Handcar Railway 豆相人車鉄道, Atami Railway 熱海鉄道, and Dai-Nippon Tramway 大日本軌道.
- Fuji Tramway 富士軌道
- Fujieda-Yaizu-kan Tramway 藤枝焼津間軌道
- Gotenba Horsecar 御殿場馬車鉄道
  - Formerly called Nonaka Gotenba Horsecar 野中御殿場馬車鉄道.
- Hamamatsu Electric Railway 浜松電気鉄道
  - Formerly called Dai-Nippon Tramway 大日本軌道.
- Horinouchi Transport 堀之内運輸
  - Former names include Jōtō Horsecar 城東馬車鉄道, Omaezaki Tramway 御前崎軌道, and Horinouchi Tramway 堀之内軌道.
- Ihara Tramway 庵原軌道
- Kōmyō Electric Railway 光明電気鉄道
- Misakubo Forest Railway 水窪森林鉄道 (Industrial railway)
- Nakaizumi Tramway 中泉軌道
- Nanzu Horsecar 南豆馬車鉄道
- Negata Tramway 根方軌道
- Seien Railway 西遠鉄道
- Senzu Forest Railway 千頭森林鉄道 (Industrial railway)
  - Former names include Second Fuji Electric Power Company 第二富士電力, and Fuji Electric Power Company 富士電力. Later merged into Chūbu Electric Power Company 中部電力.
- Shimada Tramway 島田軌道

=== Aichi Prefecture ===
- Japan Association for the 2005 World Exposition 2005年日本国際博覧会協会
- Shitara Forest Railway 設楽森林鉄道 (Industrial railway)
- Tōkadai New Transit 桃花台新交通

=== Mie Prefecture ===
- Anō Railway 安濃鉄道
- Chūsei Railway 中勢鉄道
  - Formerly called Dai-Nippon Tramway 大日本軌道.
- Kuwana Electric Tramway 桑名電軌
- Mie Electric Railway 三重電気鉄道
  - Former names include Matsuzaka Light Railway 松阪軽便鉄道, Matsuzaka Railway 松阪鉄道, Matsuzaka Electric Railway 松阪電気鉄道, Miyagawa Electric Company 宮川電気, Ise Electric Railway 伊勢電気鉄道, Mie Gōdō Electric Company 三重合同電気, Asama Tozan Railway 朝熊登山鉄道, Gōdō Electric Company 合同電気, Tōhō Electric Power Company 東邦電力, Shinto Kōtsū 神都交通, and Mie Kōtsū 三重交通. The last company is still active as a bus operator.
- Ōsugidani Forest Railway 大杉谷森林鉄道 (Industrial railway)

== Kansai region ==
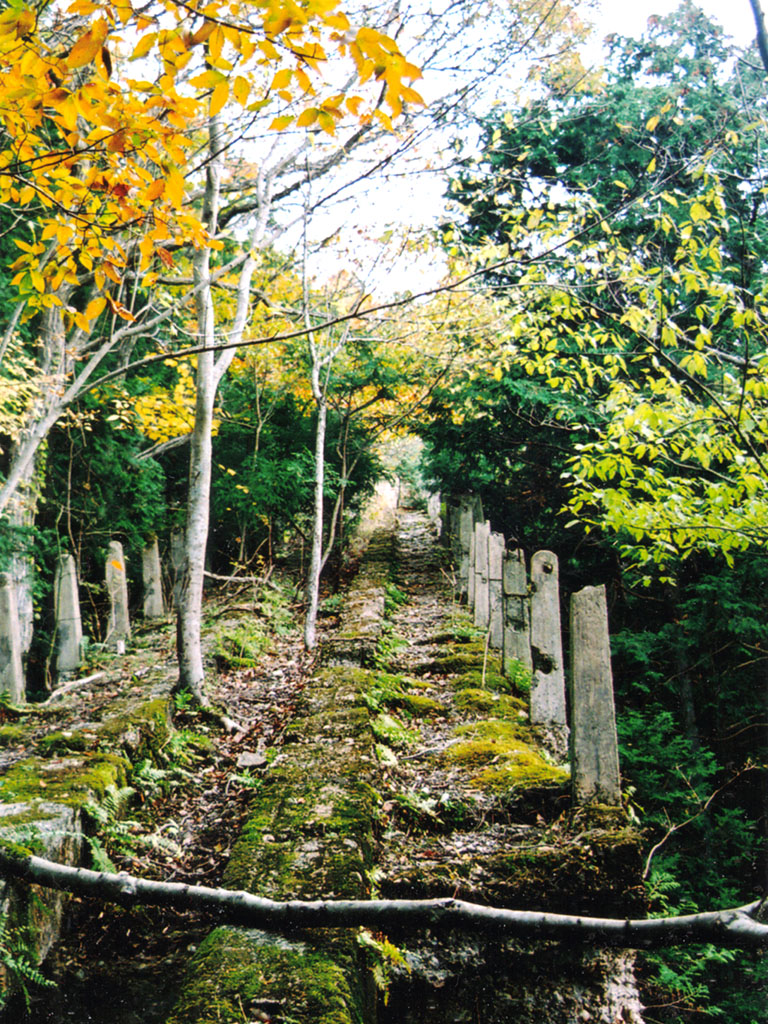
Ruins of Atagoyama Railway Line.

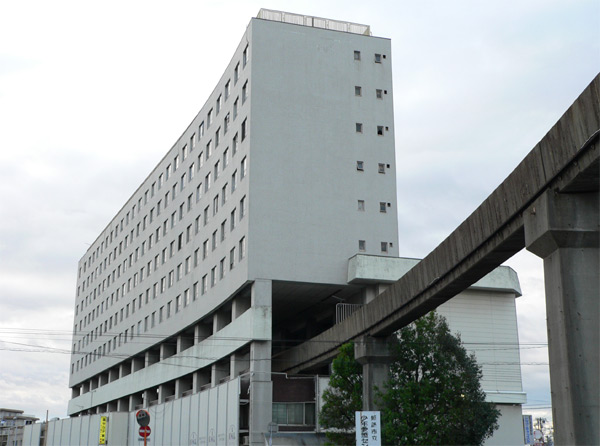
Ruins of Daishōgun Station, Himeji Municipal Monorail.

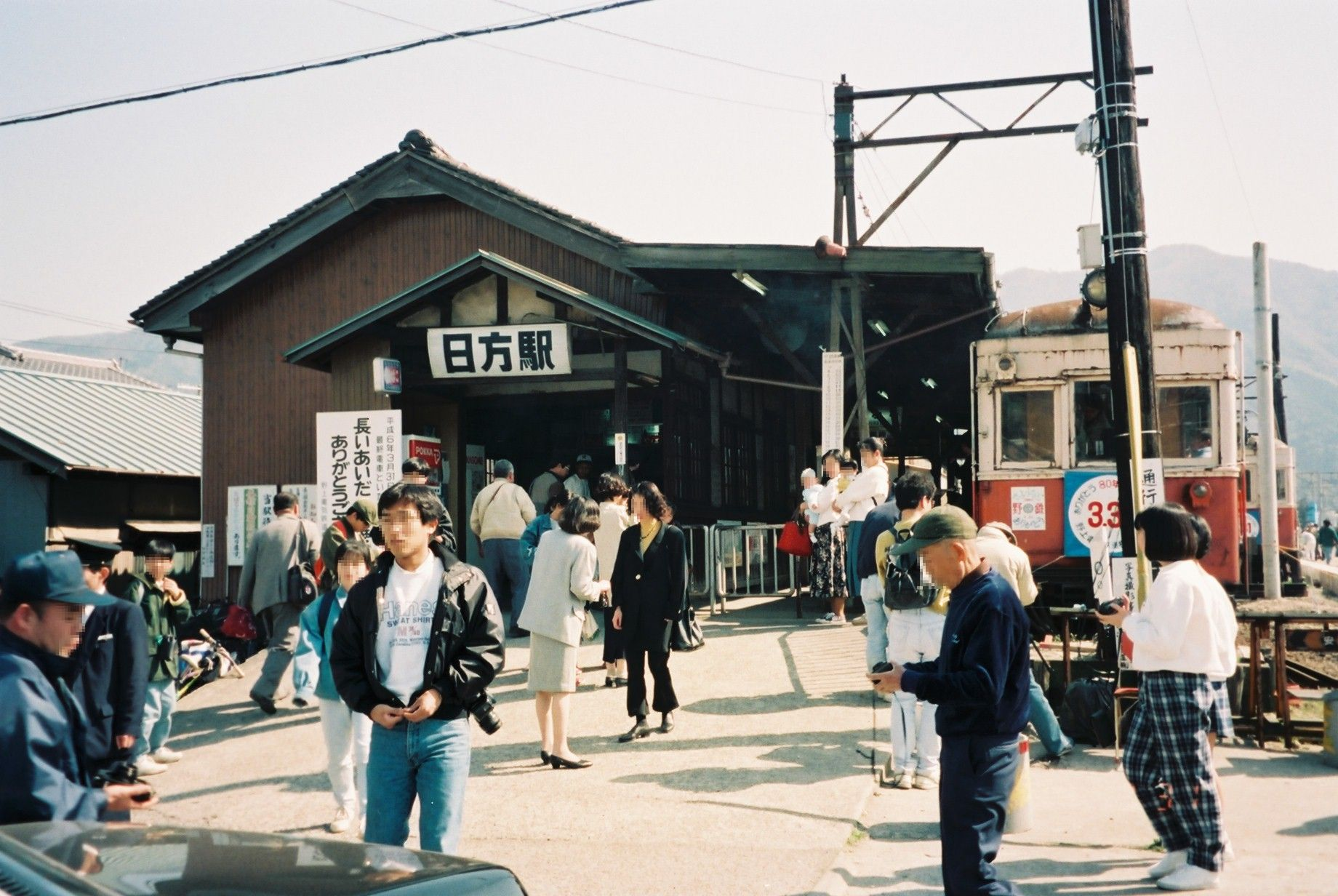
Farewell run of Nokami Electric Railway Line, 1994.

=== Shiga Prefecture ===
- Kōjaku Railway 江若鉄道
  - Still active as Kōjaku Kōtsū 江若交通, a bus operator.

=== Kyōto Prefecture ===
- Atagoyama Railway 愛宕山鉄道
- Hokutan Railway 北丹鉄道
- Kaya Railway 加悦鉄道
  - Still active as Kaya Kōsan カヤ興産, a bus and other operator.

=== Ōsaka Prefecture ===
- Minoo Cable Railway 箕面鋼索鉄道

=== Hyōgo Prefecture ===
- Awaji Railway 淡路鉄道
  - Still active as Awaji Kōtsū 淡路交通, a bus operator.
- Banden Railway 播電鉄道
  - Former names include Tatsuno Electric Railway 龍野電気鉄道, Shingū Light Railway 新宮軽便鉄道, and Banshū Water Power Electric Company 播州水力電気.
- Befu Railway 別府鉄道
  - Formerly called Befu Light Railway 別府軽便鉄道. Still active as a taxi and bus operator.
- Himeji City Transportation Bureau 姫路市交通局
  - Still active as Himeji City Public Enterprise Bureau Transportation Division 姫路市企業局交通事業部, a bus operator.
- Izushi Railway 出石鉄道
- Japan Trolleybus 日本無軌道電車
- Kitazawa Industry 北沢産業
  - Still active in its main business as a developer.
- Meishin Electric Railway 明神電車
- Myōken Cable Railway 妙見鋼索鉄道
- Sasayama Railway 篠山鉄道
  - Formerly called Sasayama Light Railway 篠山軽便鉄道

=== Wakayama Prefecture ===
- Arida Railway 有田鉄道
  - Still active as a bus operator.
- Kōyasan Forest Railway 高野山森林鉄道 (Industrial railway)
- Nogami Electric Railway 野上電気鉄道
  - Formerly called Nogami Light Railway 野上軽便鉄道. Its group companies are still active.

== Chūgoku region ==
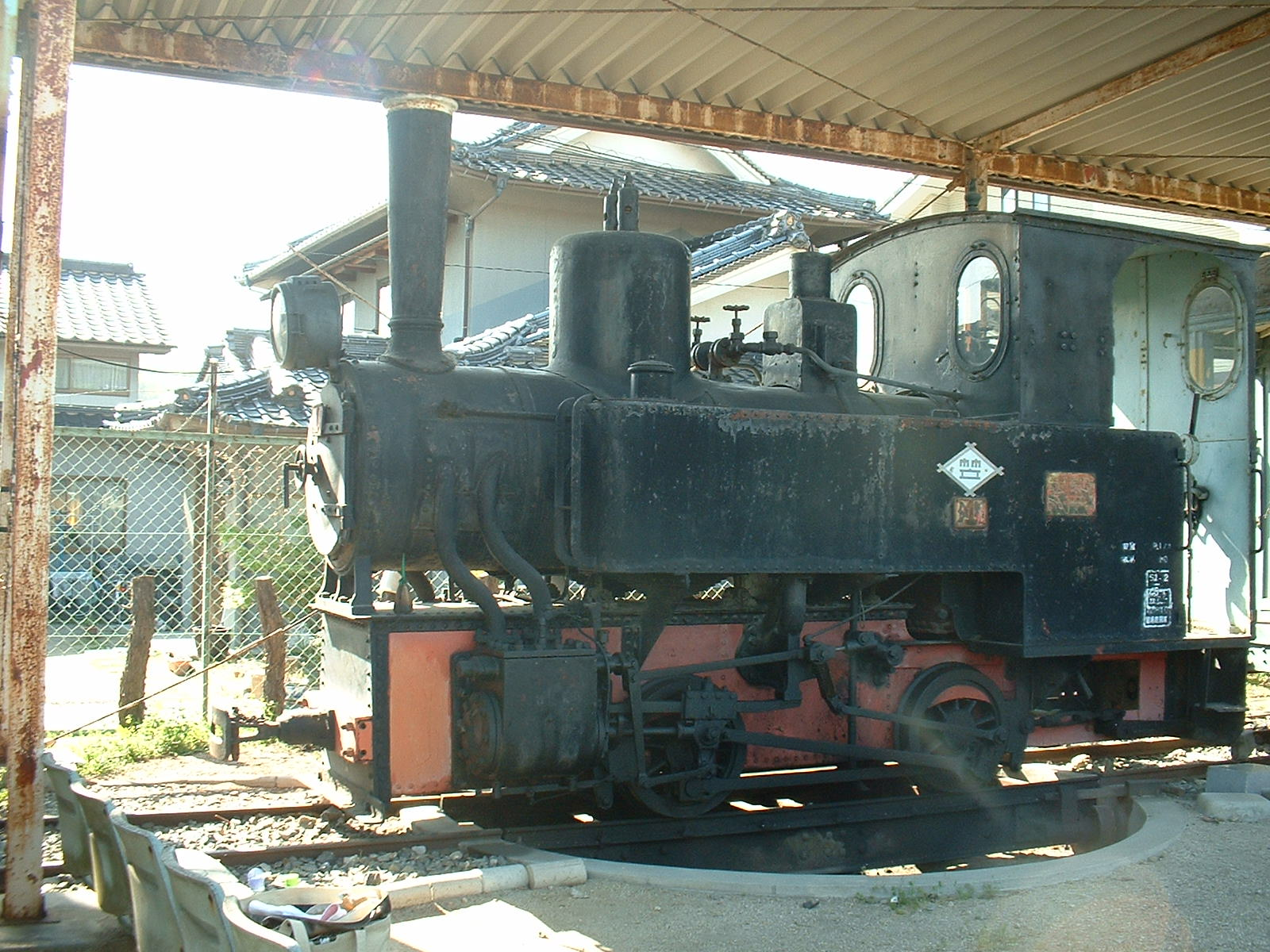
Type 1 Locomotive of Ikasa Railway, preserved at a museum.

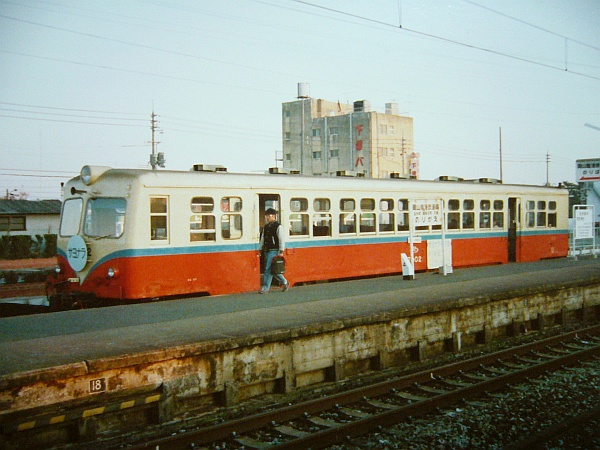
Ōmoto Station, Okayama Rinkō Railway Line, 1984.

=== Tottori Prefecture ===
- Hinomaru Bus 日ノ丸自動車
  - Former names include Hosshōji Railway 法勝寺鉄道, Hakuyō Electric Railway 伯陽電鉄, and San'in Chūō Railway 山陰中央鉄道.
- Iwai Municipal Tramway 岩井町営軌道
  - Former names include Iwai Village Tramway 岩井村自働車軌道, and Iwai Municipal Tramway 岩井村営軌道.
- Yonago Electric Tramway 米子電車軌道 The successive bus company was merged into Hinomaru Bus.

=== Shimane Prefecture ===
- Hinomaru Bus 日ノ丸自動車
  - Former names include Hosshōji Railway 法勝寺鉄道, Hakuyō Electric Railway 伯陽電鉄, and San'in Chūō Railway 山陰中央鉄道.

=== Okayama Prefecture ===
- Chūgoku Inariyama Cable Railway 中国稲荷山鋼索鉄道
- Dōwa Kōgyō 同和鉱業
  - Former names include Katakami Railway 片上鉄道, and Fujita Kōgyō 藤田興業. Still active as Dōwa Holdings DOWAホールディングス in its main business, a metal company.
- Ikasa Tetsudō 井笠鉄道
  - Former names include Ibara Kasaoka Light Railway 井原笠岡軽便鉄道, Ryōbi Light Railway 両備軽便鉄道, Ryōbi Railway 両備鉄道, and Shinkō Railway 神高鉄道. Remained active as a bus operator until 2012.
- Okayama Rinkō Railway 岡山臨港鉄道
- Ryōbi Bus 両備バス
  - Former names include Saidaiji Tramway 西大寺軌道, Saidaiji Railway 西大寺鉄道, Sanban Light Railway 三蟠軽便鉄道, and Sanban Railway 三蟠鉄道. Still active as a bus operator.
- Shimotsui Dentetsu 下津井電鉄
  - Former names include Shimotsui Light Railway 下津井軽便鉄道, and Shimotsui Railway 下津井鉄道. Still active as a bus operator.
- Tamano Municipal Electric Railway 玉野市営電気鉄道
  - Formerly called Binan Electric Railway 備南電気鉄道

=== Hiroshima Prefecture ===
- Ikasa Tetsudō 井笠鉄道
  - Former names include Ibara Kasaoka Light Railway 井原笠岡軽便鉄道, Ryōbi Light Railway 両備軽便鉄道, Ryōbi Railway 両備鉄道, and Shinkō Railway 神高鉄道. Still active as a bus operator.
- Kure City Transportation Bureau 呉市交通局
  - Still active as a bus operator.
- Onomichi Railway 尾道鉄道
  - Later merged into Chūgoku Bus 中国バス, a bus operator.
- Tomotetsudō 鞆鉄道
  - Formerly called Tomo Light Railway 鞆軽便鉄道. Still active as a bus operator.

=== Yamaguchi Prefecture ===
- Bōseki Railway 防石鉄道
  - Later merged into Bōchō Kōtsū 防長交通, a bus operator.
- Dai-Nippon Tramway 大日本軌道
- Funaki Railway 船木鉄道
  - Formerly called Funaki Light Railway 船木軽便鉄道. Still active as a bus operator.
- San'yō Electric Tramway 山陽電気軌道
  - Former names include Chōshū Railway 長州鉄道, and Nagato Railway 長門鉄道. Still active as Sanden Kōtsū サンデン交通, a bus operator.
- Yamaguchi Prefectural Tramway 山口県営軌道
  - Former names include Iwakuni Electric Tramway 岩国電気軌道, Iwakuni Electric Company 岩国電気, and Chūgai Electric Company 中外電気.

== Shikoku region ==
=== Tokushima Prefecture ===
- Hashikura Tozan Railway 箸蔵登山鉄道

=== Kagawa Prefecture ===
- Kotosan Corporation 琴平参宮電鉄
  - Former names include Sanuki Electric Tramway 讃岐電気軌道, and Kotohira Kyūkō Electric Railway 琴平急行電鉄. Still active as a bus operator.
- Yashima Tozan Railway 屋島登山鉄道

=== Ehime Prefecture ===
- Sumitomo Metal Mining 住友金属鉱山 (Industrial railway)
  - Still active in its main business.

=== Kōchi Prefecture ===
- Yanase Forest Railway 魚梁瀬森林鉄道 (Industrial railway)

== Kyūshū region ==
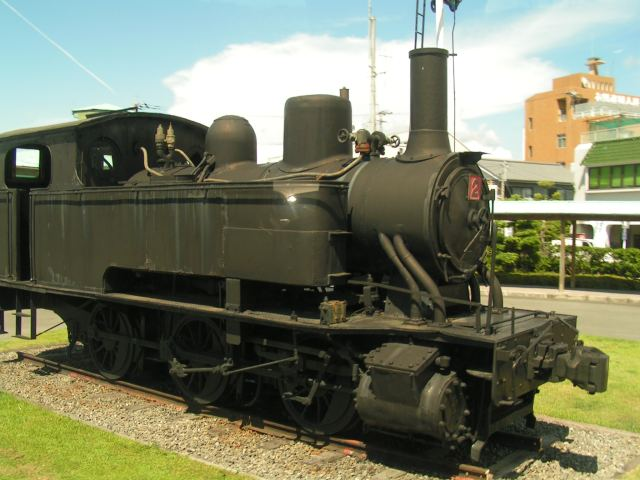
Type 2 Locomotive of Nansatsu Railway, preserved at a park.

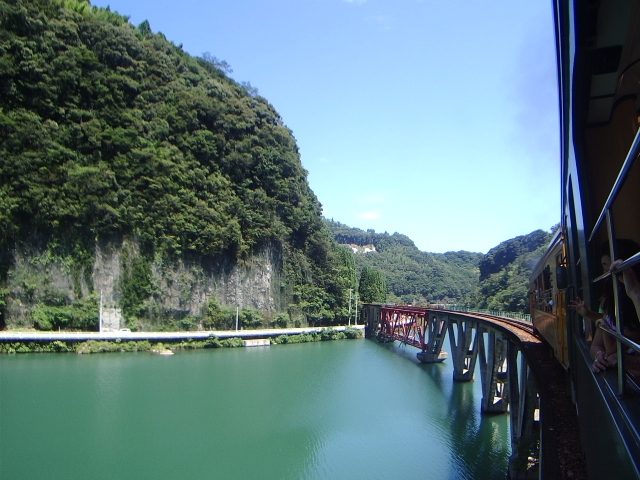
Takachiho Railway Line crossing Gokase River, 2005.

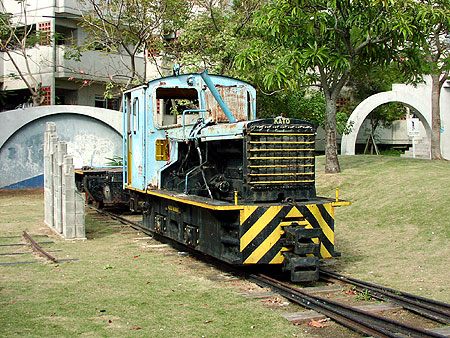
Daitō Tōgyō sugarcane train, preserved at a park.

=== Fukuoka Prefecture ===
- Asakura Tramway 朝倉軌道
  - Former names include Chūō Tramway 中央軌道, and Ryōchiku Tramway 両筑軌道.
- Ashiya Railway 芦屋鉄道
- Chikugo Tramway 筑後軌道
  - Formerly called Chikugo Horsecar 筑後馬車鉄道. The successive bus company was merged into Nishi-Nippon Railroad 西日本鉄道.
- Chikuhō Railway 筑豊鉄道
  - Former names include Kurate Light Railway 鞍手軽便鉄道, Teikoku Coal 帝国炭業, Kyūshū Mining 九州鉱業, and Chikuhō Mining Railway 筑豊鉱業鉄道.
- Kitakyūshū City Transportation Bureau 北九州市交通局
  - Formerly called Wakamatsu City Transportation Bureau 若松市交通局. Still active as a bus operator.
- Kurate Tramway 鞍手軌道
- Kyūshū Chikuhi Railway 九州肥筑鉄道
  - Formerly called Tōhi Railway 東肥鉄道.
- Mizuma Tramway 三潴軌道
- Nanchiku Tramway 南筑軌道
- Ōkuma Tramway 大隈軌道
- Tokuriki Tramway 徳力軌道
- Unoshima Railway 宇島鉄道
- Yanagawa Tramway 柳河軌道

=== Saga Prefecture ===
- Asakura Tramway 朝倉軌道
  - Former names include Chūō Tramway 中央軌道, and Ryōchiku Tramway 両筑軌道.
- Hichiku Tramway 肥筑軌道
- Hizen Electric Railway 肥前電気鉄道
  - Formerly called Hizen Electric Tramway 肥前電気軌道.
- Saga Electric Tramway 佐賀電気軌道
  - Former names include Kawakami Tramway 川上軌道, Saga Horsecar 佐賀馬車鉄道, and Saga Tramway 佐賀軌道.
- Yūtoku Tramway 祐徳軌道

=== Nagasaki Prefecture ===
- United States Forces Japan 在日米軍 (Industrial railway)
  - Still active in its main operation.

=== Kumamoto Prefecture ===
- Arao City Transportation Bureau 荒尾市交通局
  - Formerly called Arao City Transportation Division 荒尾市交通部.
- Kumamoto Light Railway 熊本軽便鉄道
- Kyūshū Chikuhi Railway 九州肥筑鉄道
  - Formerly called Tōhi Railway 東肥鉄道.
- Naidaijin Forest Railway 内大臣森林鉄道 (Industrial railway)
- Yamaga Onsen Railway 山鹿温泉鉄道
  - Former names include Kamoto Tramway 鹿本軌道, and Kamoto Railway 鹿本鉄道. Still active as Katetsu Kōtsū 鹿鉄交通, a bus operator.
- Yūen Railway 熊延鉄道
  - Formerly called Mifune Railway 御船鉄道. Still active as Kumamoto Bus 熊本バス, a bus operator.

=== Ōita Prefecture ===
- Chikugo Tramway 筑後軌道
  - Former names include Chikugo Horsecar 筑後馬車鉄道. The successive bus company was merged into Nishi-Nippon Railroad 西日本鉄道.
- Nippon Mining 日本鉱業 (Industrial railway)
  - Still active as Nippon Mining & Metals 日鉱金属 in its main business.
- Ōita Kōtsū 大分交通
  - Former names include Usa Sangū Railway 宇佐参宮鉄道, Kunisaki Railway 国東鉄道, Hijū Railway 日出生鉄道, Hōshū Railway 豊州鉄道, Hōshū Electric Railway 豊州電気鉄道, Hōgo Electric Railway 豊後電気鉄道, Kyūshū Water Power Electric Company 九州水力電気, Beppu Ōita Electric Railway 別府大分電鉄, and Yabakei Railway 耶馬渓鉄道. Still active as a bus operator.

=== Miyazaki Prefecture ===
- Aya Forest Railway 綾森林鉄道 (Industrial railway)
- Hyūga Tramway 日向軌道
- Miyazaki Kōtsū 宮崎交通
  - Former names include Miyazaki Light Railway 宮崎軽便鉄道, and Miyazaki Railway 宮崎鉄道. Still active as a bus operator.
- Shiromi Tramway 銀鏡軌道
- Takachiho Railway 高千穂鉄道

=== Kagoshima Prefecture ===
- Kagoshima Kōtsū 鹿児島交通
  - Former names include Nansatsu Railway 南薩鉄道, and Satsunan Chūō Railway 薩南中央鉄道. Still active as a bus operator.

=== Okinawa Prefecture ===
- Daitō Tōgyō 大東糖業 (Industrial railway)
  - Former names include Tamaoki Shōkai 玉置商会, Tōyō Sugar 東洋製糖, and Dai-Nippon Sugar 大日本製糖. Tōyō Sugar is different from the current company with the same name. Dai-Nippon Sugar (the current Dai-Nippon Meiji Sugar 大日本明治製糖) and Daitō Tōgyō are still active in their main businesses, sugar companies.
- Itoman Horsecar 糸満馬車軌道
- Okinawa Electric Company 沖縄電気
  - Formerly called Okinawa Electric Tramway 沖縄電気軌道.
- Okinawa International Oceanic Exposition Association 沖縄国際海洋博覧会協会
- Okinawa Prefecture Railway 沖縄県鉄道
  - Formerly called Okinawa Prefecture Light Railway 沖縄県軽便鉄道.
- Okinawa Tramway 沖縄軌道
  - Former names include Okinawa Handcar Tramway 沖縄人車軌道, and Okinawa Horsecar 沖縄馬車軌道.

== See also ==
- ja:日本の廃止鉄道路線一覧 (List of defunct railway lines in Japan)
- List of railway companies in Japan
- List of railway lines in Japan
- List of railway stations in Japan
- Railway electrification in Japan
- Rail transport in Japan
- Monorails in Japan
- List of aerial lifts in Japan
- List of airport people mover systems
- List of bus operating companies in Japan
- Specified local lines, a list of Japanese railway lines subject to the 1980 JNR Reconstruction Act
- ja:未成線 (Uncompleted line)
