= Yonabaru Line =

Railway line in Okinawa Prefecture

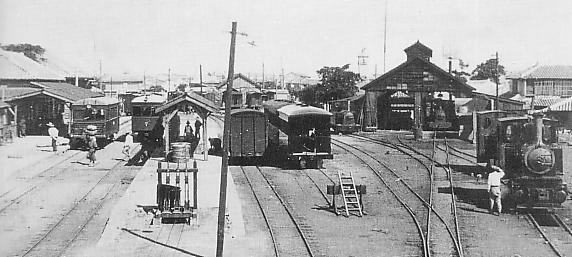
Naha Station before the war

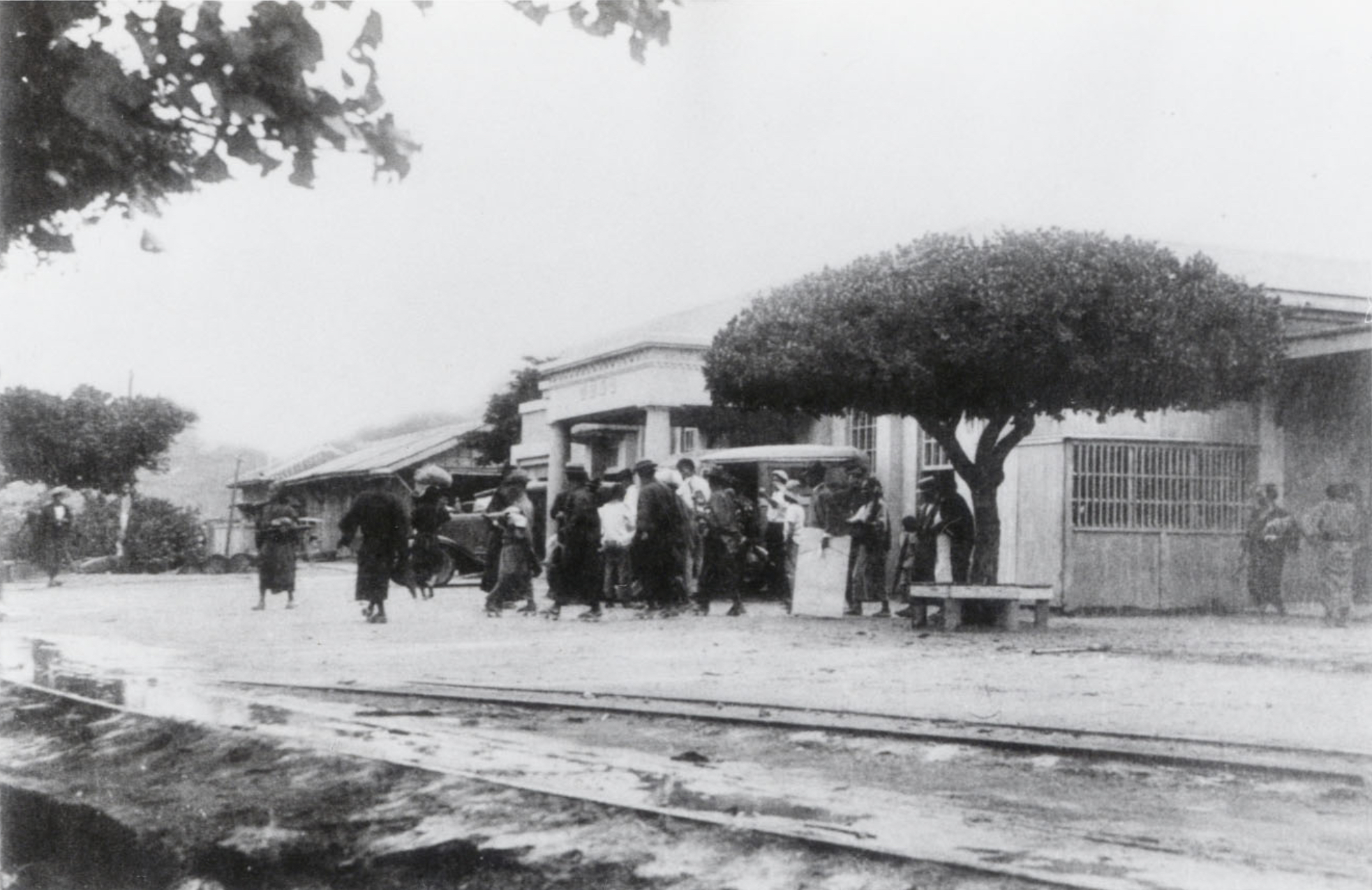
Yonabaru Station circa 1930

The Yonabaru Line (与那原線, Yonabaru-sen) was a narrow-gauge light railway line in Okinawa Prefecture before the Battle of Okinawa. One of the four lines of Okinawa Prefectural Railways on Okinawa Island, it ran 9.4 kilometres (5.8 mi) from Naha Station to Yonabaru Station.

== Route ==
As published by the Ministry of Railways, as of 1 October 1937 the stations on the line between Naha Station and Yonabaru Station were as follows:

Yonabaru Line 与那原線
Distance		Station name				Municipality	
S2S (km)	Total (km)	Transcribed, English	Kanji	Station opened	Connections	Contemporary	Current
0.0	0.0	Naha	那覇	1914-12-01	Kairiku Renraku Line	Naha City	Naha City
1.2	1.2	Kohaguchi	古波蔵	1922-03-28	Kadena Line	Mawashi Village	Naha City
1.1	2.3	Madan-Bashi	真玉橋	1915-07-27		Mawashi Village	Naha City
1.0	3.3	Kokuba	国場	1914-12-01	Itoman Line	Mawashi Village	Naha City
1.3	4.6	Ichinichi-Bashi	一日橋	1915-07-27		Mawashi Village	Naha City
1.4	6.0	Haebaru	南風原	1914-12-01		Haebaru Village	Haebaru Town
2.3	8.3	Ōzato	大里	1917-01-23		Ōzato Village	Nanjō City
1.1	9.4	Yonabaru	与那原	1915-01-20		Ōzato Village	Yonabaru Town

== See also ==
- 2 ft 6 in gauge railways in Japan
- Rail transport in Okinawa
