= Echigo Kotsu =

Japanese public transport company

Echigo Kotsu Co., Ltd.
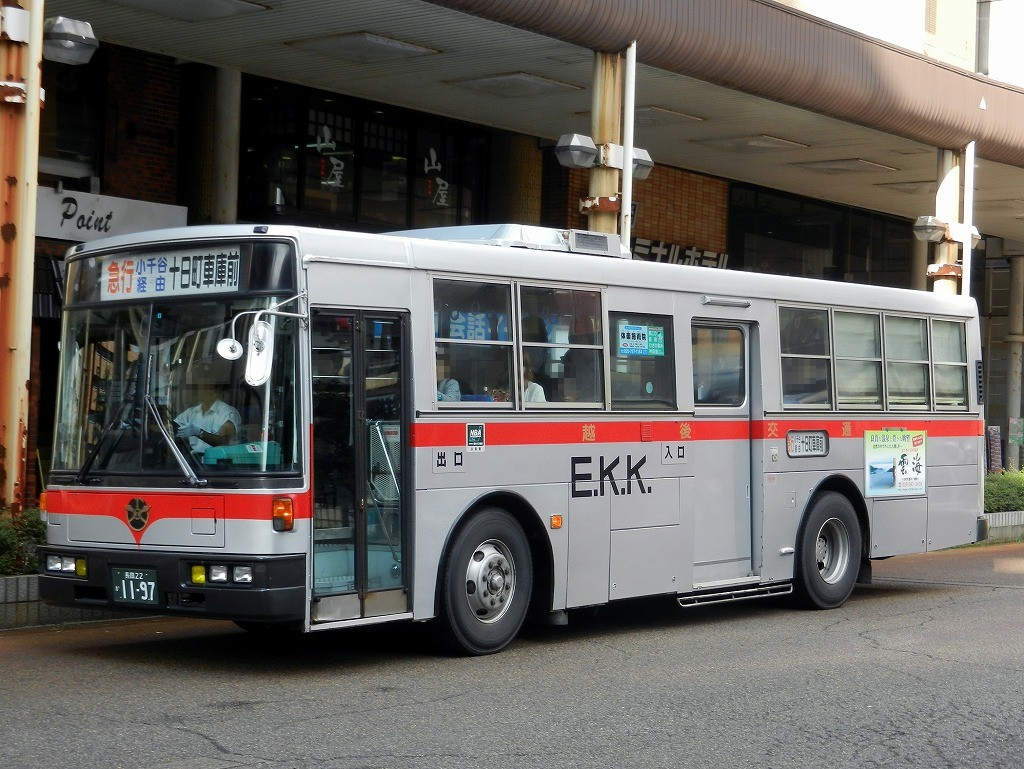
- Native name: 越後交通株式会社
- Type: Corporation
- Industry: Public transportation (Bus)
- Founded: October 1960
- Founder: Kakuei Tanaka
- Headquarters: Nagaoka, Niigata, Japan
- Area served: Niigata Prefecture
- Key people: Naoki Tanaka (chairman); Makiko Tanaka (adviser)
- Website: www.echigo-kotsu.co.jp

Echigo Kotsu Co., Ltd. (越後交通株式会社, Echigo-kōtsū Kabushiki-gaisha) is a public transportation company which operates local and long-distance buses in Niigata prefecture, Japan.

== History ==
Echigo Kotsu was founded by the politician and businessman Kakuei Tanaka by the merger of Nagaoka Railway, the Chuetsu Motor Company and the Tochio Electric Railway, in October 1960. The merger was realised with the help of Tokyu chairman Keita Gotō and Kokusai Kogyo owner Kenji Osano.

Tanaka was the first chairman. The company was became the centerpiece of Tanaka's local political network and was intertwined with his influential supporter's association, the Etsuzankai. The two organisations had overlapping executives and a shared headquarters.

The Tanaka family remain major shareholders. Since June 2022, Kakuei Tanaka's son-in-law Naoki Tanaka is chairman and his daughter Makiko is adviser. Previously, Makiko was chairman and Naoki was president.

== Bus lines ==
=== Regular buses ===
As of October 2018, Echigo Kotsu and its subsidiary (Minami Echigo Kanko Bus) operate regular buses mainly in the cities of Nagaoka, Kashiwazaki, Ojiya, Mitsuke, Sanjō, Tōkamachi, Uonuma and Minamiuonuma.

Yoita, Bunsui, Teradomari, Izumozaki Area

North Kashiwazaki Area

South Kashiwazaki Area

=== Highway buses ===
- Niigata - Nagaoka
- Niigata - Kashiwazaki
- Niigata - Takada - Naoetsu
Highway Buses in Niigata Prefecture. Echigo Kotsu operates "E"-marked lines

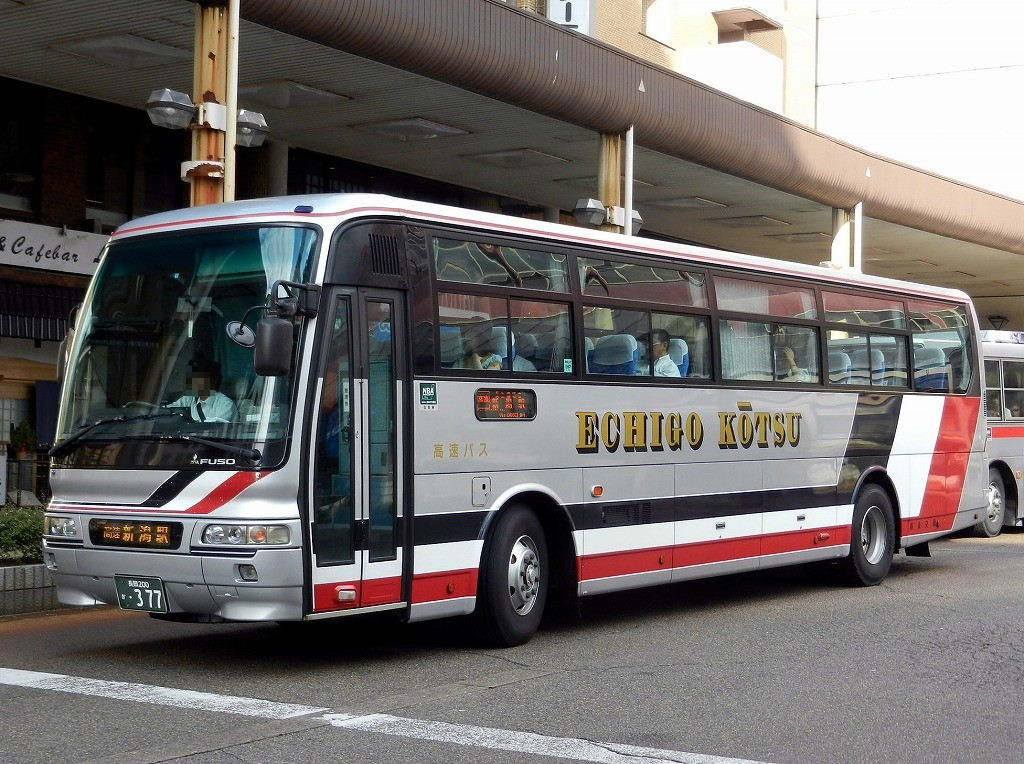
A bus for Echigo Kotsu highway bus
