= Rail transport in Okinawa =

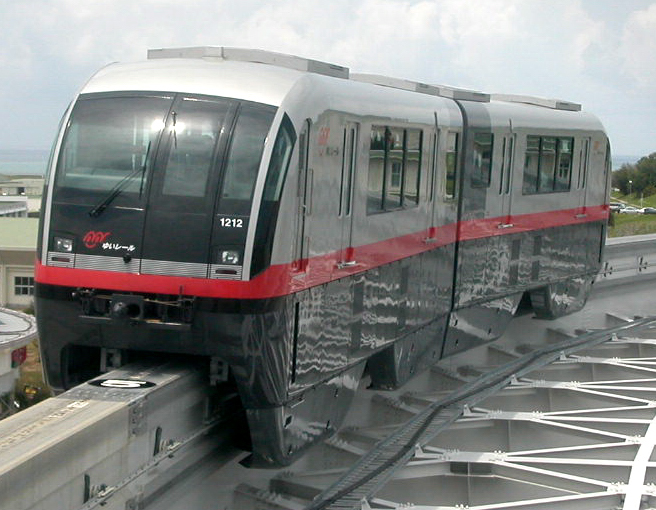
Okinawa Urban Monorail at Akamine, the southernmost rail station in Japan

Rail transport in Okinawa (沖縄県の鉄道, Okinawa-ken no Tetsudō) consists of only the Okinawa Urban Monorail, the only rail line providing rail transportation in Okinawa Prefecture. In the past, Okinawa Island had railroad, trams, and horse-drawn streetcar service. Moreover, Minamidaitōjima and other islands had rail lines to transport sugarcane and other commodities.

== History ==
=== Meiji period ===
The first rail line laid down in Okinawa was during the Meiji period when in 1902, in Minami Daitō, a line opened with handcars. Okinawa Island's first railway opened in 1910, for the transportation of sugar cane.

=== Taishō period ===
After many false starts, rail transportation began in earnest during the Taishō period. The Okinawa Electric Railway (the predecessor of Okinawa Electric Company), having received exclusive rights to this route in 1910, opened the island's first streetcar line, between Daimon-mae and Shuri (5.7 km, 1067 mm gauge, 500 V). Some months later, as an expansion of service on the sugar-cane line in Nishihara, the company introduced person-drawn service between Yonabaru and Konaha (762 mm gauge).

This line would later convert to horse-drawn service. Extensions brought the rails to Awase, part of the present-day city of Okinawa (17.7 km). Meanwhile, the prefectural government, recognizing the failure of private attempts, was preparing its own line, and opened the Okinawa Prefectural Railways line between Naha and Yonabaru in December 1914.

At the end of the Taishō period, the prefecture completed a railway system having three lines radiating from Naha: one to Kadena, one to Yonabaru, and one to Itoman.

Okinawa Electric also extended its routes. A horse-drawn trolley linking Naha and Itoman also began operations. This was the peak of the rail system in Okinawa.

=== Shōwa Period (pre-war and wartime) ===
Along with the development of roadways, automobile traffic increased, and railroads experienced competition from buses. Okinawa Electric responded by introducing gasoline cars, but users of their trolleys and the Itoman horse-drawn trolley line declined, and the lines were abandoned. As a result, the only lines still operating on Okinawa Island were the prefectural railway and the Okinawa Railway (the former Okinawa horse-drawn line). Both ceased operations in 1944-1945, and aerial bombardment and the ensuing ground war devastated the rail systems.

=== Shōwa period (postwar) and Heisei Period ===
Under the American Occupation, the road system of Okinawa developed markedly, and the prefectural railway and the Okinawa trolley line disappeared. The industrial rail systems disappeared, too, with the exception of the Minami Daito sugar-cane line, which returned to operation and continued to operate until 1983.

After the return of Okinawa to Japanese administration in 1972, the prefecture considered plans to develop rail lines, and opened the Okinawa Monorail in August, 2003.

A people mover operated within the grounds of the Expo '75, the Okinawa International Maritime Exposition, from July 20, 1975 to January 18, 1976. The 1.4 km line connected North Gate Station and South Gate Station, making an intermediate stop at International Plaza Station.

== Lines ==
=== Okinawa Electric Railway and Okinawa Electric Company ===
Saiga Tokichi, operator of Saiga Electric Company of Kyoto, established Okinawa Electric in 1909. In 1911, he established the Okinawa Electric Railway to link Naha and Shuri with a trolley line. The segment from Daimon-mae to Shuri opened in 1914, and that from Daimon-mae to Tsudo began operation in 1917. However, the line lost passengers to competition from buses, and the line ceased operations in 1933.

=== Okinawa Railway ===
Although the original intent was to transport sugar cane by handcar to the refinery in Nishihara, the line was unused in the off-season, and the operator set up a separate company to provide passenger service on the line. It opened in November 1914, providing service between Yonabaru and Konaha.

In 1916 it extended its route to Awase. It ceased operations in 1944.

=== Itoman horse-drawn carriage line ===
The Itoman line directly connected Naha and Itoman by horse-drawn carriage.

In June 1919 the segment from Kakihana to China opened. In May 1920, the rest of the line opened. Under competition from buses, the line lost ridership, and operations came to an end in 1935. The line formally ended in 1939.

=== Expo '75 ===
From July 20, 1975 to January 18, 1976, a people mover built by Kobe Steel, operated within the grounds of Expo '75. It was the first people mover line to operate in Japan.

=== Minamidaitōjima ===
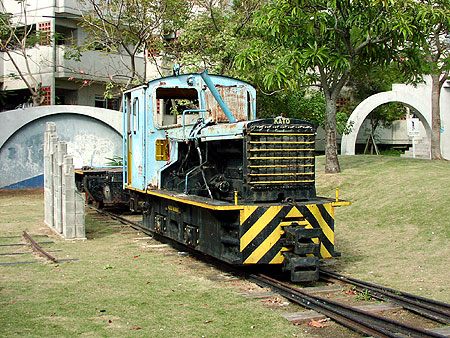
Daito sugarcane train, now preserved at a park in Naha.

The line that operated on Minamidaitōjima is known by various names; among them are "Minamidaitōjima Sugar Railway" (南大東島砂糖鉄道, Minamidaitōjima Satō Tetsudō) and "Minamidaitōjima's Sugar Train" (南大東島のシュガートレイン, Minamidaitōjima no Shugā Torein). The first rails laid down in Okinawa, they included lines that encircled the island and others that relayed traffic to the harbor. The tracks exceeded 30 km in length. In addition to hauling sugar cane, they also conveyed passengers and mails.

In the Meiji period, Minamidaitōjima was uninhabited, but in 1900, Tamaoki Shokai began to develop the island, and started both the sugar refinery and the handcar railway in 1902. In 1917 the commercial rights passed to Toyo Sugar Refining. The railway was converted to a gauge of 762 mm and began seriously hauling sugar cane. In 1927, Toyo merged with Dainippon Sugar Refining.

During World War II, aerial attacks destroyed the railway, but in 1950, Daito Sugar Refining restored it to operation. It served through the 1983 spring season, and thereafter, trucks replaced the railway for the transportation of sugar cane.

The upgrade of the gauge to 762 mm permitted the use of steam locomotives, and in 1956, diesel locomotives were introduced. At present, steam and diesel locomotives, passenger and freight cars have been preserved on Minamidaitōjima.

Naha also has a diesel locomotive from the Prefectural Yohabaru Line.

=== Other ===
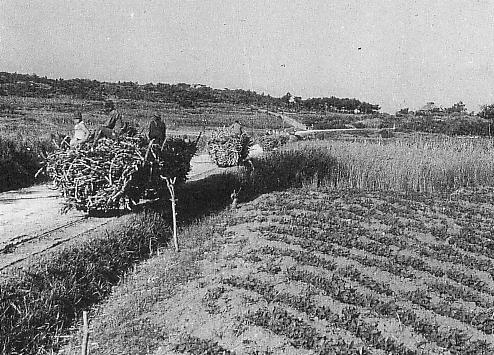
Sugar cane tram in Miyako Island, 1939

Prior to World War II, railways were in use in various places, but all disappeared after the war. Locations included what are present-day Nishihara, Kadena, and Itoman. The islands of Ishigaki and Miyako also had lines to move sugar cane, and Iriomote had handcar lines for the coal mines. Kita Daito and Oki Daito had similar lines for phosphate mines.

== Monorail ==
The Okinawa Urban Monorail opened in 2003. It was designed to overcome the severe congestion on the island. Construction began in 1996 and it now extends some 17 km in the city of Naha. In October of 2019 the monorail was extended to Urasoe.

The monorail is a venture of the prefecture and private enterprise. There are 19 stations on the line.

== Steam locomotives ==
There are only 2 Steam locomotives in Okinawa Prefecture.

- JNR Class D51 No. 222 at Yogi Park, Naha.
- Sugar Railway No. 2 at the Sugar Museum, Minamidaitōjima.

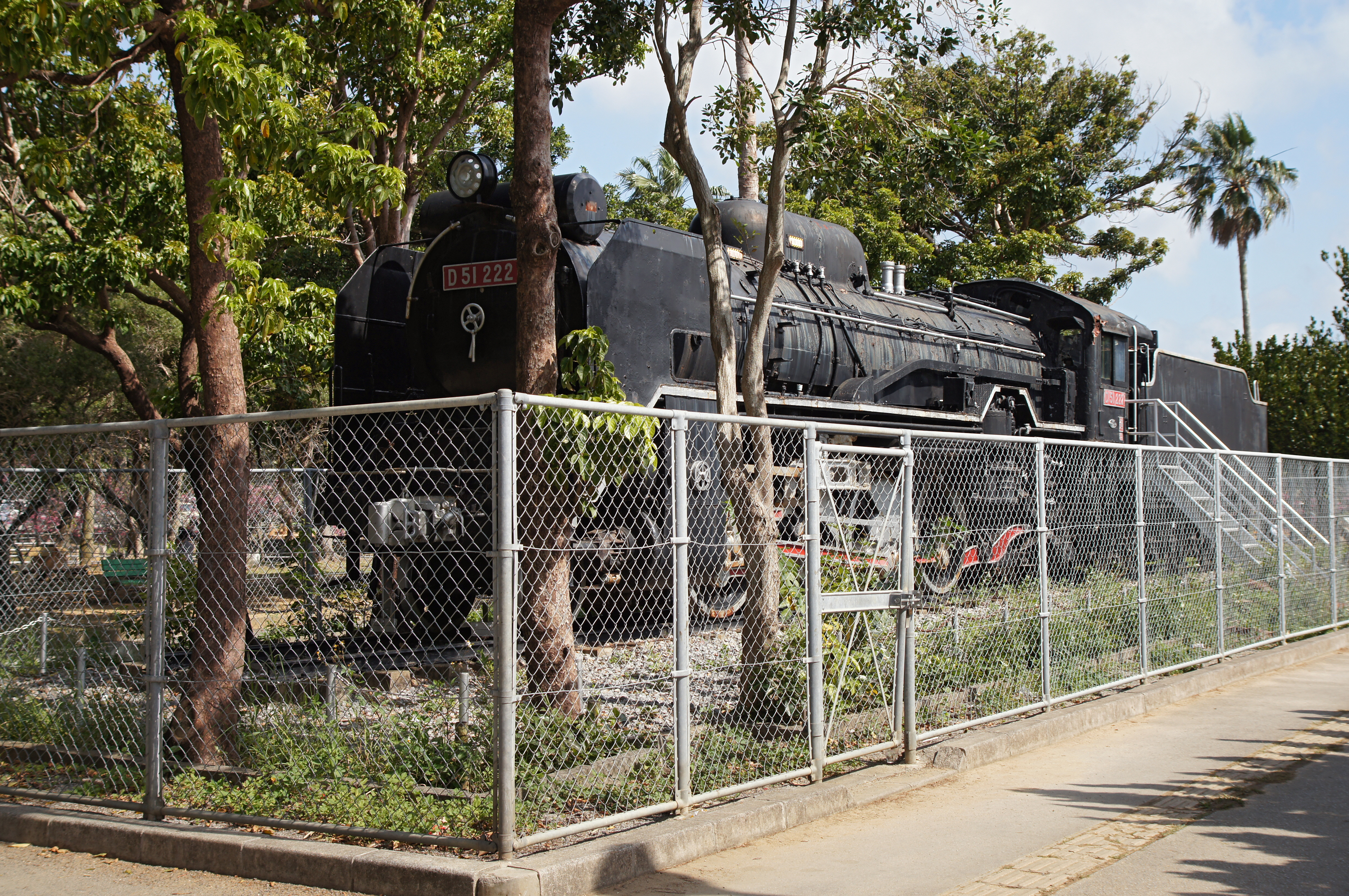
JNR D51 222, now preserved at a park in Naha.

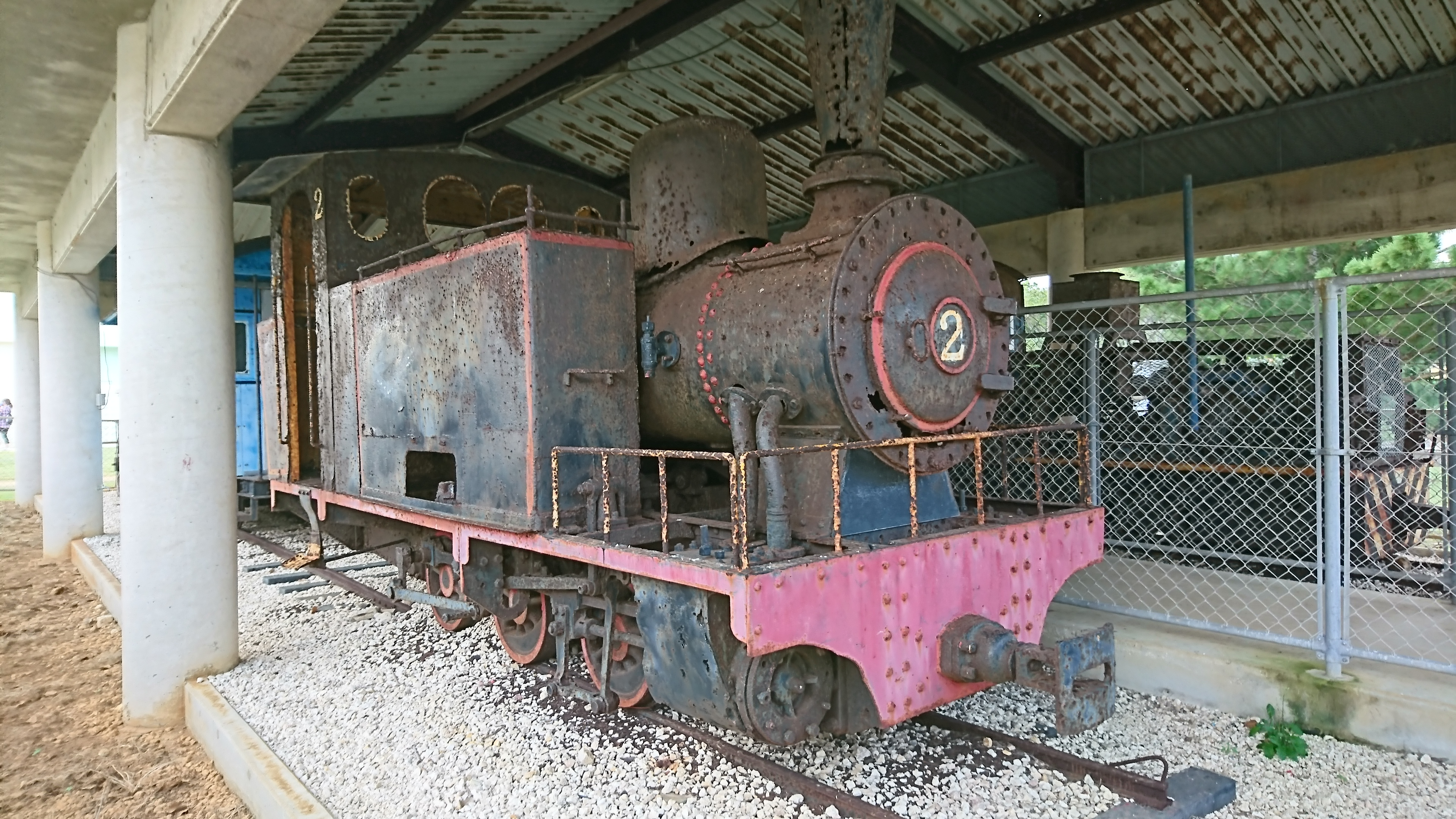
Daito sugarcane train, now preserved at a Museum in Minamidaitōjima.
