= Okinawa Prefectural Railways =

Former railway in Okinawa Prefecture

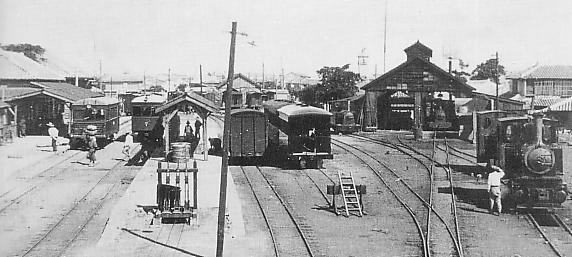
Naha Station

Okinawa Prefectural Railways (沖縄県営鉄道, Okinawa Ken'ei Tetsudō) was the railway operated by the Okinawa Prefectural Government on Okinawa Island from 1914 to 1945. Locally called the Keebin (Okinawan pronunciation of keiben, part of keiben tetsudō or "light railway"), it operated about 48 kilometers of 2 ft 6 in (762 mm) gauge light railway until it was destroyed in the Battle of Okinawa.

== Lines ==
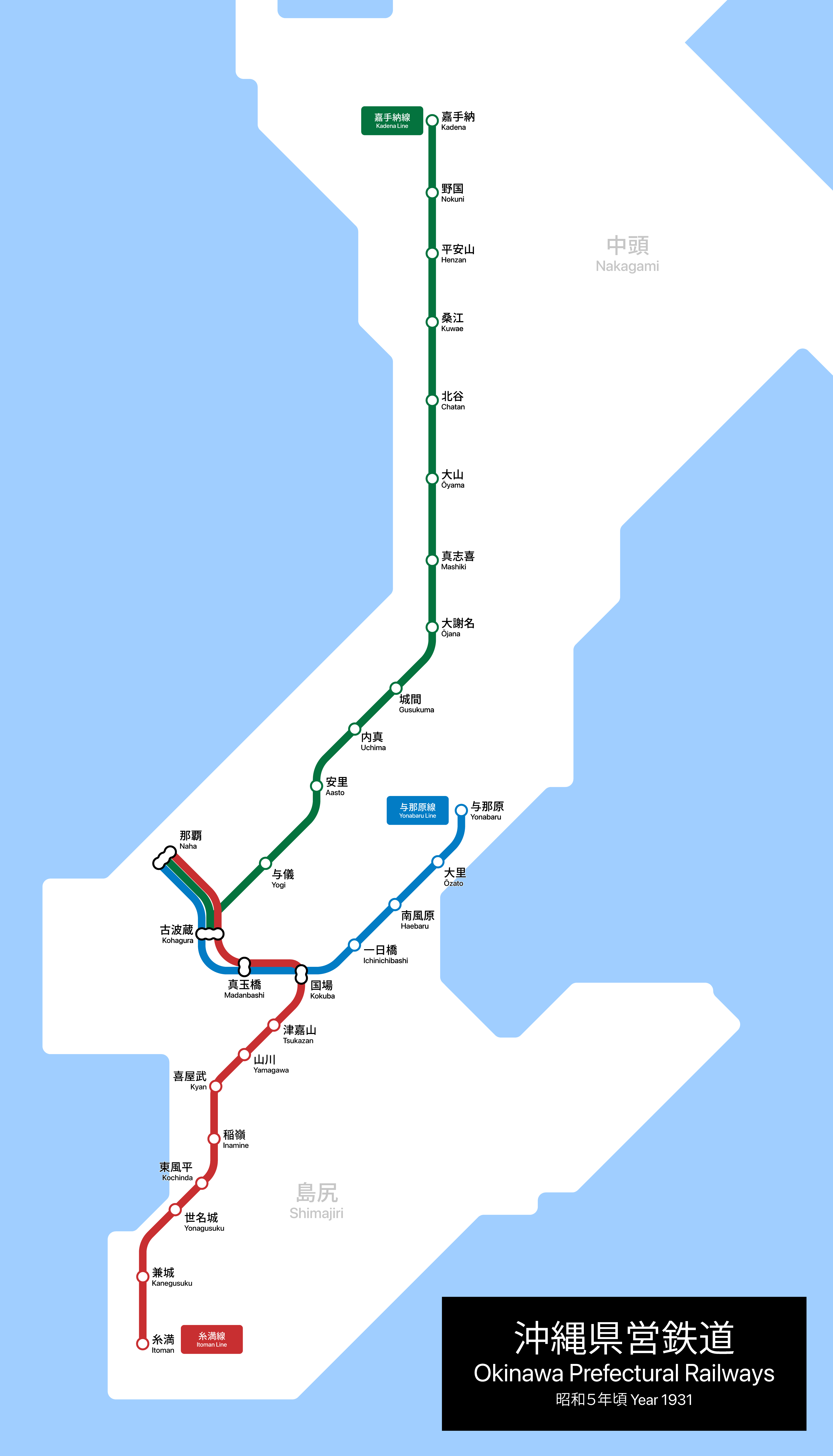
Route map as per year 1931

The railway operated following four 762-mm gauge lines as of April 1, 1943:

- Naha – Yonabaru (Yonabaru Line, 9.4 km)
- Kohagura – Kadena (Kadena Line, 22.3 km)
- Kokuba – Itoman (Itoman Line, 15.0 km)
- Naha – Sanbashi Niatsukaisho (Freight Line, 0.9 km)

Note: Kohagura and Kokuba were intermediate stations of the Yonabaru Line.

== History ==
The Yonabaru Line opened on December 1, 1914. The freight line to Sanbashi Niatsukaisho opened on July 1, 1917. The Kadena Line and the Itoman Line opened on March 28, 1922 and July 11, 1923 respectively.

The railway introduced gasoline railcars in 1930. The number of railcars increased to six by 1938. However, the shortage of gasoline soon resulted in less use of the railcars.

In the preparation stage for the Battle of Okinawa, the railway ceased normal operation on July 10, 1944, when 13,000 men of Imperial Army 9th Division started landing at Naha. From the next day the railway mostly operated trains for the military. After the air raid on October 10, 1944 which destroyed Naha Station as well as two locomotives, four railcars and six coaches, the operation was not resumed until early November.

On December 11, 1944, a train on the Itoman Line carrying weapons, ammunition and fuel exploded for unknown reason in Haebaru. About 210 soldiers, eight students and three railway employees on board were killed. By the number of death, this is the deadliest railway accident in the history of Japan.

The attacks by the enemy preceding the landing (April 1, 1945) finally forced the railway operation discontinued by the end of March 1945. The exact date of final operation of the railway is not known.

== Rolling stock ==
The railway used 12 steam locomotives, six railcars, 52 passenger coaches and 51 freight cars.

Nos. 1, 2 and 3 were 0-4-2 locomotives made by Henschel in Germany in 1914. No. 4 was 0-4-0 locomotive made by Nippon Sharyo in Nagoya, Japan in 1921 and was scrapped in 1936. Nos. 6, 7 and 8 were 0-6-0 locomotives made by Orenstein & Koppel in Germany in 1923. Nos. 11, 12, 13 and 14 were 0-6-0 locomotives made by Avonside Engine Company in England between 1911 and 1913 for the Ishinomaki Line and were bought from the Japanese Government Railways which reconstructed the Ishinomaki Line to 1,067 mm (3 ft 6 in) gauge in 1920. No. 20 was 0-6-2 locomotive made in Motoe Kikai Works in Toyama, Japan in 1942.
