= Class 150 =

Class 150 may refer to:

- British Rail Class 150
- DB Class ETA 150
- JGR Class 150
