= History of rail transport in Japan =

This article is part of the history of rail transport by country series.

1918 Toppan Printing Co. map of Japanese Railways

The history of rail transport in Japan began in the late Edo period. There have been four main stages:

1. Stage 1, from 1872, the first line, from Tokyo to Yokohama, to the end of the Russo-Japanese war;
2. Stage 2, from nationalization in 1906–07 to the end of World War II;
3. Stage 3, from the postwar creation of Japanese National Railways to 1987;
4. Stage 4, from privatization to the present, with JNR split among six new railway operators for passengers and one for freight.

== Stage 1: early development, 1872–1906 ==
The development of the Japanese railway network commenced shortly after the country opened its borders to formal international contact after a shogunate-imposed isolation of about 250 years, and was initiated (along with many other changes to Japanese society at the time) so that Japan could achieve rapid modernization.

Though rail transport had been known through limited foreign contact such as with Dutch traders in Dejima, Nagasaki, the impact of model railroads brought by foreigners such as Yevfimiy Putyatin and Commodore Matthew C. Perry was huge. The British also demonstrated a steam locomotive in Nagasaki. Saga Domain, a Japanese feudal domain (han), made a working model and planned to construct a line. Bodies such as the Satsuma Domain and the Tokugawa shogunate reviewed railway construction from Edo to Kyoto via an inland route, but a line did not come to reality before the Meiji Restoration.

Whilst the Emperor of Japan, based in Kyoto, was the titular ruler of the country, since circa 1600 Japan had been effectively ruled by the Tokugawa shogunate, based in Edo. In 1866 the shogunate proposed a railway from Edo to Kyoto via an inland route, but in 1868 the Meiji Restoration saw the Emperor returned as an effective leader of the country, relocating his permanent residence to the renamed Tokyo ("Eastern Capital"). Just before the fall of the shogunate, the Tokugawa regime issued a grant to the American diplomat Anton L. C. Portman to construct a line from Yokohama to Edo (soon to be renamed Tokyo), but this grant was not continued by the new regime.

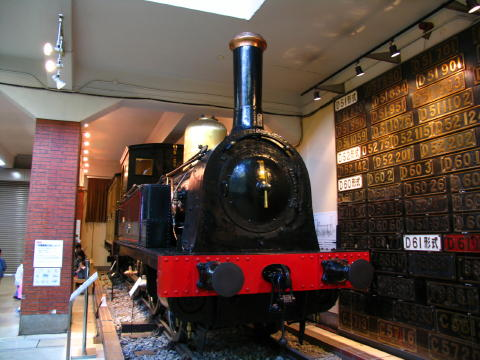
No. 1, one of Japan's earliest locomotives, later JGR Class 150, was UK made

In 1868 Thomas Blake Glover, an Anglo-Scottish merchant, was responsible for bringing the first steam locomotive, "Iron Duke", to Japan, which he demonstrated on an 8-mile track in the Ōura district of Nagasaki. However, after about 250 years of a culture of distrust of foreigners, construction of the premier railway connecting Japan's former and new capitals by non-Japanese was considered politically unacceptable to the new Japanese regime, and so the government of Japan decided to build a railway from the major port of Yokohama to Tokyo using British financing and 300 British and European technical advisors: civil engineers, general managers, locomotive builders and drivers. In order to undertake its construction, foreign experts were contracted, with the specific intent that such experts would educate Japanese co-workers so that Japan could become self-sufficient in railway construction expertise, at which time the foreign contractors were expected to leave the country. On Nagatsuki 12, Meiji 5, the first railway, between Shimbashi (later Shiodome) and Yokohama (present Sakuragichō) opened. (The date is in Tenpō calendar; October 14, 1872 in present Gregorian calendar). A one-way trip took 53 minutes in comparison to 40 minutes for a modern electric train. Service started with nine round trips daily.

British engineer Edmund Morel (1841–1871) supervised construction of the first railway on Honshu during the last year of his life, American engineer Joseph U. Crowford (1842–1942) supervised construction of a coal mine railway on Hokkaidō in 1880, and German engineer Herrmann Rumschottel (1844–1918) supervised railway construction on Kyushu beginning in 1887. All three trained Japanese engineers to undertake railway projects. Shikoku was relatively resource-poor and maintained fewer railways than the other major islands, with the only major ones being found near the ports of Takamatsu and Tokushima. Honshu had both private and public rails, which often began in Osaka and Tokyo and radiated outwards to other major urban centers, whereas private and resource extraction-oriented railways were more common in Kyushu, Hokkaido, and Shikoku. Two men trained by Crowford later became presidents of Japan National Railways. A bronze bust of Morel in Yokohama, a bronze statue of Crowford in the Temiya Railway Memorial Museum, and a bust of Rumschottel in Hakata commemorate their contributions to Japan's railways.

The precise reason why a track gauge of 3 ft 6 in (1,067 mm) (also known as "Cape gauge" from its use in the Cape Colony in South Africa) came to be selected remains uncertain. It could be because this gauge was supposed to be cheaper to build than the internationally more widely used "Stephenson gauge" of 4 ft 8 1/2 in (1,435 mm), or because the first British agent, whose contract was later cancelled, ordered iron sleepers made for the narrower gauge. It seems most likely, however, that Morel's previous experience building Cape gauge railways in similar New Zealand terrain was a significant influence, and Cape gauge became the de facto standard.

=== Network expansion ===
The next line constructed was from another port, Kobe, to the major commercial city of Osaka (opening in 1874), and then to Kyoto (1877) and Otsu (1880) at the southern end of Lake Biwa. A line was constructed from Tsuruga, on the Sea of Japan, to Ogaki (connecting to a canal to Nagoya) via Nagahama on the northern end of Lake Biwa, opening in 1884 and utilizing trans-shipment onto water-going vessels to connect the Sea of Japan to Osaka, Kyoto and Nagoya.

Linking Tokyo to Nagoya and Kyoto became the next priority. Initially, the proposed route was inland, from Tokyo north to Takasaki, then west through the Usui Pass to Karuizawa and the Kiso River valley. At this time the Nippon Railway Co. (NRC) became the first to be granted a concession to operate what became the Tohoku Main Line from Ueno to Aomori, with a branch line from Omiya to Takasaki. Construction of both lines was undertaken by the Government at the company's expense, with the government having running rights on the Takasaki-Ueno section. The line to Takasaki opened in 1884, as did the Tohoku line as far as Utsunomiya.

The NRC also financed a new line linking to the Yokohama line which was built from Akabane via Shinjuku to Shinagawa (with the NRC gaining track usage rights at the government station at Shinagawa). This was the first section of what has become the Yamanote Line, and opened in 1885.

The government-funded line from Takasaki reached Yokokawa at the base of the Usui Pass in 1885, and initial surveys indicated a ruling grade of 10% (later improved to 6.67%) and extensive tunnelling was required to reach Karuizawa.

Construction also started on another line from the Sea of Japan, commencing at Naoetsu and opening to Karuizawa via Nagano in 1888.

As the costs of construction through the mountainous interior of Japan became apparent, in 1886 the construction of what became the Tokaido line was approved, approximately paralleling the southern coastline (and Tokaido road) as far as Nagoya. Although ~238 km longer, it was projected to cost 13% less, this saving then being allocated to construct a line from Otsu along the eastern side of Lake Biwa to Nagahama to remove the need for trans-shipment, which opened in 1889, as did the final section of the Tokaido Line via Gotemba. Until the opening of the Tokaido Shinkansen in 1964, this was the most important main line in Japan.

In the meantime, the Tohoku line reached Sendai in 1887 and Aomori in 1891.

=== Consolidating the network ===
In 1888 the San'yō Railway Co. (SRC) was granted a charter to build the San'yō Main Line from Kobe west to Shimonoseki, a port providing a connection to the port of Moji on Kyushu, from which the Kyushu Railway Co (KRC) built its line to Hakata and Kumamoto opening between 1889 and 1891, extended to Yatsushiro in 1896. The SRC line reached Hiroshima in 1894, and Shimonoseki in 1901.

Other private endeavours included the Mito Railway, which opened the first section of the Joban Line in 1889 and was acquired by the NRC in 1892 which extended to Sendai via an east coastal route in 1905 and the Bantan Railway, which built a 52 km line north from Himeji between 1894 and 1901, and was acquired by the SRC in 1903.

The success of the Nippon Railway Co and other private companies led to a Japanese situation akin to the UK Railway Mania. From the mid-1880s until 1891 new railway companies had little difficulty in attracting funding, usually through issuing shares. However, in 1891 the failure of a company proposing to build a line from Gotenba to Matsumoto ended the "mania", and the Government realized a more planned approach to the network expansion it desired was required. Despite the end of the initial railway mania, the physical expansion of the network had a profound economic impact on the country’s industrialization. Gaining rail access directly led to higher average capital investment per firm.

=== Evolving policy ===
In 1887 the Japanese Army proposed building its own lines to ensure routes of military significance were given priority. The Railway Department deflected that proposal by commencing the development of a policy for a comprehensive national network. The Japanese Government became increasingly interested in policy formulation following the completion of the Tokaido Main Line in 1889, the creation of the National Diet in 1890 and the financial panic of 1891.

1891 also saw construction start on the Usui Pass section, the ~11 km section to Karuizawa requiring 26 tunnels, 18 viaducts and to be worked using the Abt rack railway system to cope with the 6.67% ruling grade. The line opened in 1893, linking Naoetsu and Nagano to Tokyo.

In 1892 the Railway Construction Act (RCA) listed a series of priority routes on Honshu, Kyushu and Shikoku (Hokkaido was covered separately in 1896 legislation), with the specific policy that private construction of such routes would be encouraged, with the Japanese Government only funding routes not able to be privately constructed. By that year the privately owned network was ~2,124 km compared to the government-owned sections totalling ~887 km. While this figure seemed to indicate the potential for further private funding of railway construction (notwithstanding the routes already targeted by private companies), subsequent events demonstrated otherwise.

A two-phase approach was adopted in the RCA, with 40 routes totalling ~3,000 km included in the "phase one" 12-year program, with phase 2 covering another ~4,000 km of proposed lines, the priorities being set based on economic development and/or military strategic importance.

A specific outcome of the RCA was that every prefecture would be served by railway communication. The major routes proposed under the act for government construction included;

- The Chuo line, an inland connection from Tokyo to Nagoya favoured by the military (detailed below);
- The Ou line, also detailed below;
- Extension of the line from Tsuruga to Kanazawa and Toyama (Hokuriku Main Line) opened 1896–1899;
- A connection from the Chuo line at Shiojiri to Matsumoto and Nagano (Shinonoi Line) opened in 1900–1902; and
- The original inland line from Kagoshima to Yatsushiro (now the Nippo Main Line and Hisatsu Line) opened 1901–1909

The Chuo line, the route which approximated the initial proposed inland line between Tokyo and Nagoya, was favoured by the military as its inland alignment protected it from the perceived risk of bombardment by enemy vessels. A privately built line from Shinjuku to the silk industry centre of Hachioji opened in 1889, and this became the starting point for government construction.

The newly determined route was via Kofu (through the 4,657 m Sasago tunnel, which was the longest in Japan until the Shimizu Tunnel opened in 1931), Shiojiri and then via the Kiso River valley to Nagoya. Construction was undertaken from both ends, with sections opening sequentially from 1900 until the lines were connected in 1911.

The Ou line from Fukushima to Yamagata, Akita and Aomori, serving the poorer northern Sea of Japan coastal prefectures, was seen as a priority for national development that was commercially unattractive. The government commenced construction from Aomori towards Hirosaki in 1894, and at the southern end from Fukushima in 1899, the lines connecting in 1905.

Tellingly, most of the major routes proposed under the act for private construction were not so funded and were ultimately constructed by the government, including;

- Oita – Miyazaki, opened 1911–1923 as part of the Nippo Main Line;
- Takamatsu – Kochi – Yawatahama (a 44 km section was built privately in 1889–1897, the remaining ~300 km route opened 1914–1951 as parts of the Yosan Line, Dosan Line and Yodo Line);
- Okayama – Yonago, opened 1919–1928 as the Hakubi Line;
- Shinjo – Sakata, opened 1913–1914 as the Rikuu West Line;
- Morioka – Omagari, partially opened as a light railway in 1921, upgraded and completed in 1966 as the Tazawako Line and now part of the Akita Shinkansen line.

A few of the lines that were privately funded included Tsubata – Nanao, opened in 1898 as the Nanao Line, and the Kabe Line from Hiroshima, opened 1909–1911 as a 2'6" gauge light railway, the proposed destination of Hamada on the Sea of Japan coast never being reached.

In contrast, the major naval port of Kure was proposed to be served by a government line from Hiroshima, opened as a private line in 1903 only to be nationalized in 1906.

The development and in particular the financing of the railway network featured an ongoing debate about the merits of private vs public railway ownership, with an example of this situation being the Horonai Railway on Hokkaido, which was constructed using public funds in 1880, privatized in 1889 and re-nationalized in 1906.

Construction continued on routes already secured by private companies, including a direct Osaka – Nagoya line opened in 1898 by the Kansai Railway Co.

Railway policy development had evolved rapidly as the learnings about, and benefits of the railway became apparent, and as the Japanese government realized it could not afford to finance all the railway construction desired. However, even as it facilitated private railway development, some government representatives advocated for all railways to be nationally owned.

Given the Japanese government could not fund all construction on the main island of Honshu, let alone the rest of Japan, it is no surprise the construction of the initial lines on Hokkaido, Shikoku and Kyushu was undertaken by the Prefectural government and private companies respectively, and then the Hokkaido line was sold to a private operator in 1889, though the government built the line from Hakodate to Otaru in 1903–04, which connected to the private line to Sapporo.

By 1905, ~80% of the Japanese railway network was privately owned, and included joint operations such as an overnight sleeper train from Tokyo to Shimonoseki, changing from JGR to SRC operation at Kobe.

Politicians such as Inoue Masaru stated all the railway lines should be nationalized. However, the government was financially strained after the Satsuma Rebellion, making the expansion of the network slow. Politicians then wanted to allow private companies to build railways. Consequently, Nippon Railway was founded as a private entity, strongly affecting the government's projects. It expanded railways fairly quickly, completing the main line between Ueno and Aomori (present Tōhoku Main Line) in 1891. With the success of Nippon Railway, private companies were also founded. San'yō Railway, Kyūshū Railway, Hokkaidō Colliery and Railway, Kansai Railway and Nippon Railway were called the "major five private railways" at the time. At the same time, the national railway opened lines, including the current Tōkaidō Main Line in 1889, but most of its lines were subsidiary to major private lines. In 1892, the Imperial Diet promulgated the Railway Construction Act, which listed 33 railway routes that should be constructed by either the government or private entities.

Railways were introduced to provide both inter-city and intra-city transport. The first horsecar line in Japan was built in Tokyo in 1882. The first tram was the Kyoto Electric Railway (京都電気鉄道, Kyōto Denki Tetsudō), which opened in 1895.

Some operators began to use EMUs rather than locomotives for inter-city transport. Many such railway companies, modelled after interurbans in the United States, are the origins of the current private railway operators.

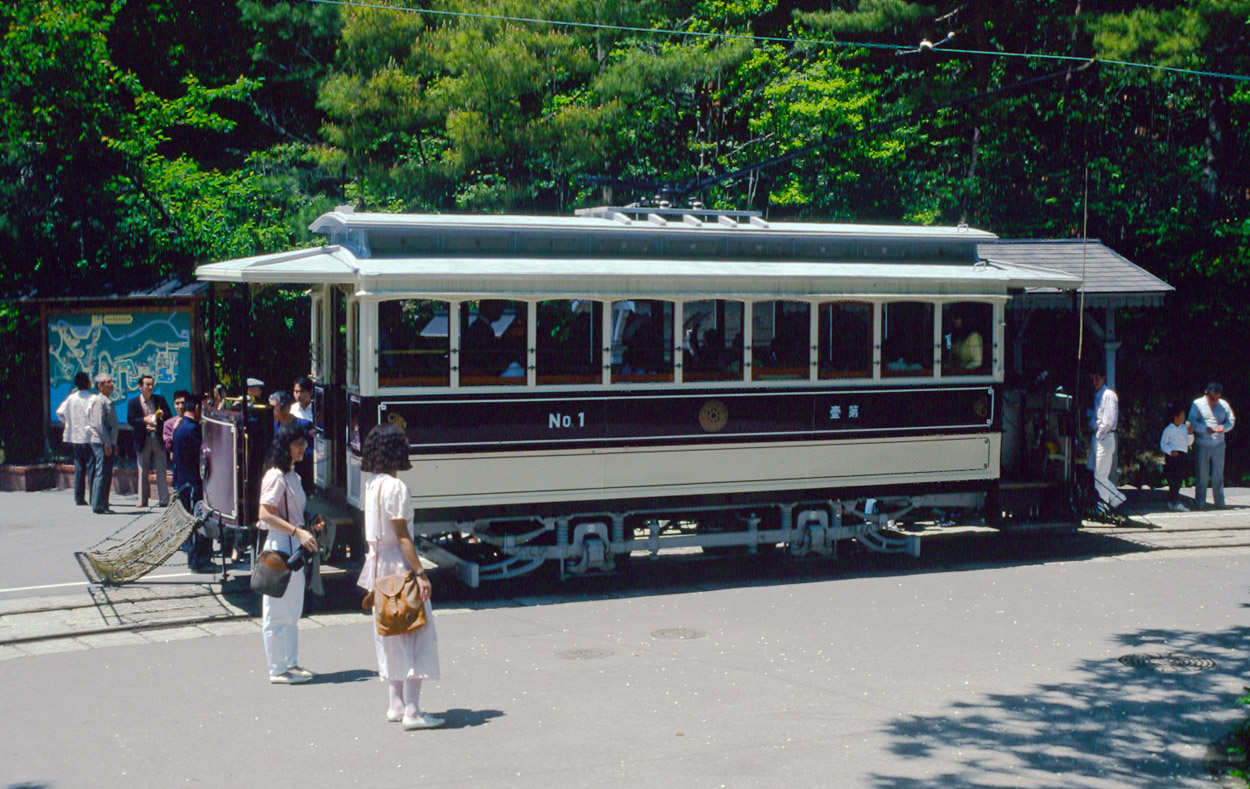
A tramcar of the former Kyoto Electric Railway, now operating in the Meiji-mura open-air museum

- 1872 – Opening of Japan's first railway between Shimbashi (Tokyo) and Sakuragichō
- 1889 – Completion of the Tōkaidō Main Line
- 1892 – Promulgation of the Railway Construction Act
- 1893 – Class 860 steam locomotive, the first locomotive built in Japan
- 1895 – Opening of Japan's first streetcar, in Kyoto

== Stage 2, 1906–1945 ==
=== 1906 nationalization ===
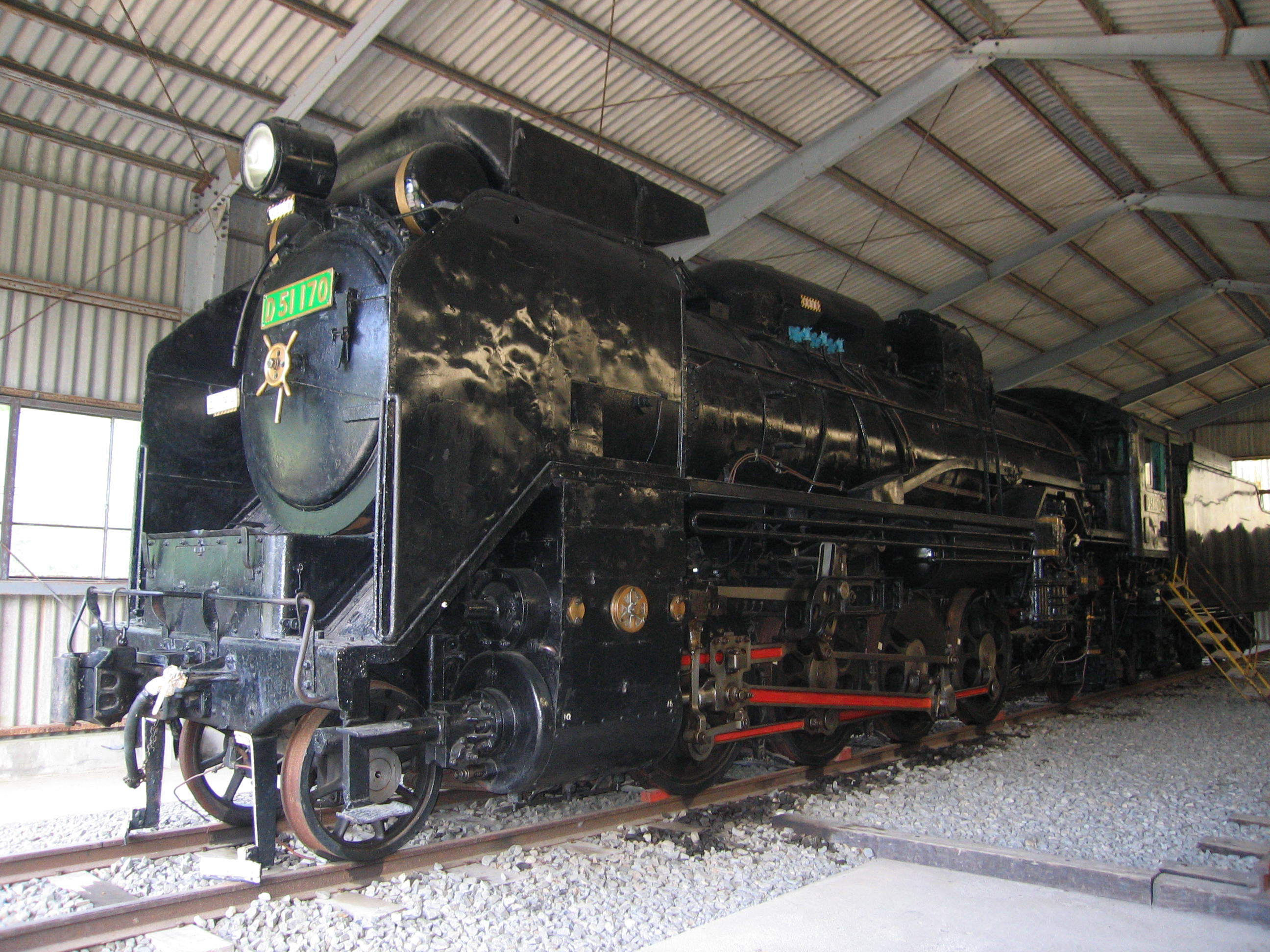
D51, debuted in 1936, is the most mass-produced steam locomotive in Japan with 1,115 units.

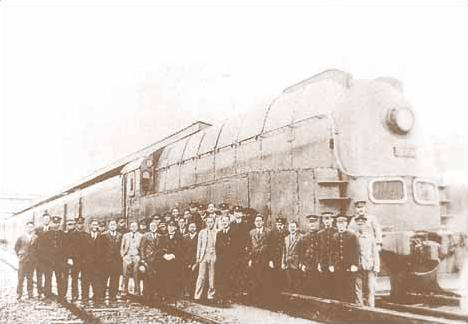
South Manchuria Railway

The military expressed concern about the delays in troop movements that occurred during the 1904–05 Russo-Japanese War, and attributed such delays to the mix of private and government railway ownership. The attribution tipped the balance in favour of the nationalization of the major railway companies, and in 1906 the Government proposed to nationalize 42 railway companies, though ultimately 17 companies were involved, including the "Big 5" companies (Nippon, San'yō, Kyushu and Kansai Railway companies and the Hokkaido Coal & Railway Co), and covering virtually all main intercity/regional routes.

The major shareholders of the railway companies being nationalized welcomed the move, for differing reasons. In the case of the "Big 5" companies, dividend payments had predominated over capital expenditure on maintenance and improvements, and such deferred expenditure was a looming liability had nationalization not occurred. In the case of smaller companies which had not been as profitable as the "Big 5", the market for Government bonds (which were used to pay for the nationalization) was usually better than for shares in the smaller railways, as well as providing at least the same, if not a better rate of return.

The legislation authorizing the nationalization also provided for the continuation of private railways (and the creation of new companies) providing local (i.e. non-mainline) rail transport. However, as most such lines would be less (or un)profitable branch lines, the 1910 Light Railways Act was required to authorize the construction of lower-cost lines, including 2'6" gauge lines, to enable the provision of railways to smaller and/or more remote communities.

Some of the resulting lines initially constructed to 2'6" gauge were later regauged to 3'6" where there was economic justification to do so.

=== Pre-war development ===
Locomotives for the early railways were usually built in the country of the designing engineer. The first railways on Honshu used locomotives built in the United Kingdom. Locomotives from the United States arrived in Hokkaidō in 1888 and from Germany arrived in Kyushu in 1889. Early British locomotives were often tank locomotives, while the earliest American locomotives were 2-6-0 and 4-4-0 types with tenders. German manufacturers produced a number of smaller tank locomotives including some for 762 mm (2 ft 6 in) narrow gauge. Richard Trevithick's grandson Francis Henry Trevithick became locomotive superintendent for JNR in the late 19th century and ordered locomotives from the United Kingdom including numerous 4-4-0 types. His brother Richard Francis Trevithick designed the first locomotive to be manufactured in Japan in 1893. Japanese manufacturers initially depended heavily on imported locomotive parts. JNR ceased importing locomotives in 1912. Thereafter, with the exception of a few experimental locomotives manufactured by Orenstein & Koppel or American Locomotive Company, production locomotives were JNR designs built by Japanese manufacturers.

Private railway companies were the major players in the early stages. However, after the First Sino-Japanese War and the Russo-Japanese War, the government planned to directly control the unified railway network for strategic purposes. In 1906 the Railway Nationalization Act was promulgated, nationalizing many trunk railway lines. From this time, the nationalized railway became the major Japanese network.

However, having used its money for nationalizing, the government did not have enough money to expand the network to the countryside. It passed the Light Railway Act, encouraging smaller private operators to build light railways (軽便鉄道, keiben tetsudō).

Larger private railway operators developed their businesses, modelled on interurbans. Hanshin Express Electric Railway (the current Hankyu Railway) built its own department store connected to its terminus; the management model is still used. Unlike interurban operators in the United States, which suffered from motorization as early as the 1910s, Japanese counterparts did not experience the phenomenon until the 1960s, giving them stable development and allowing their survival.

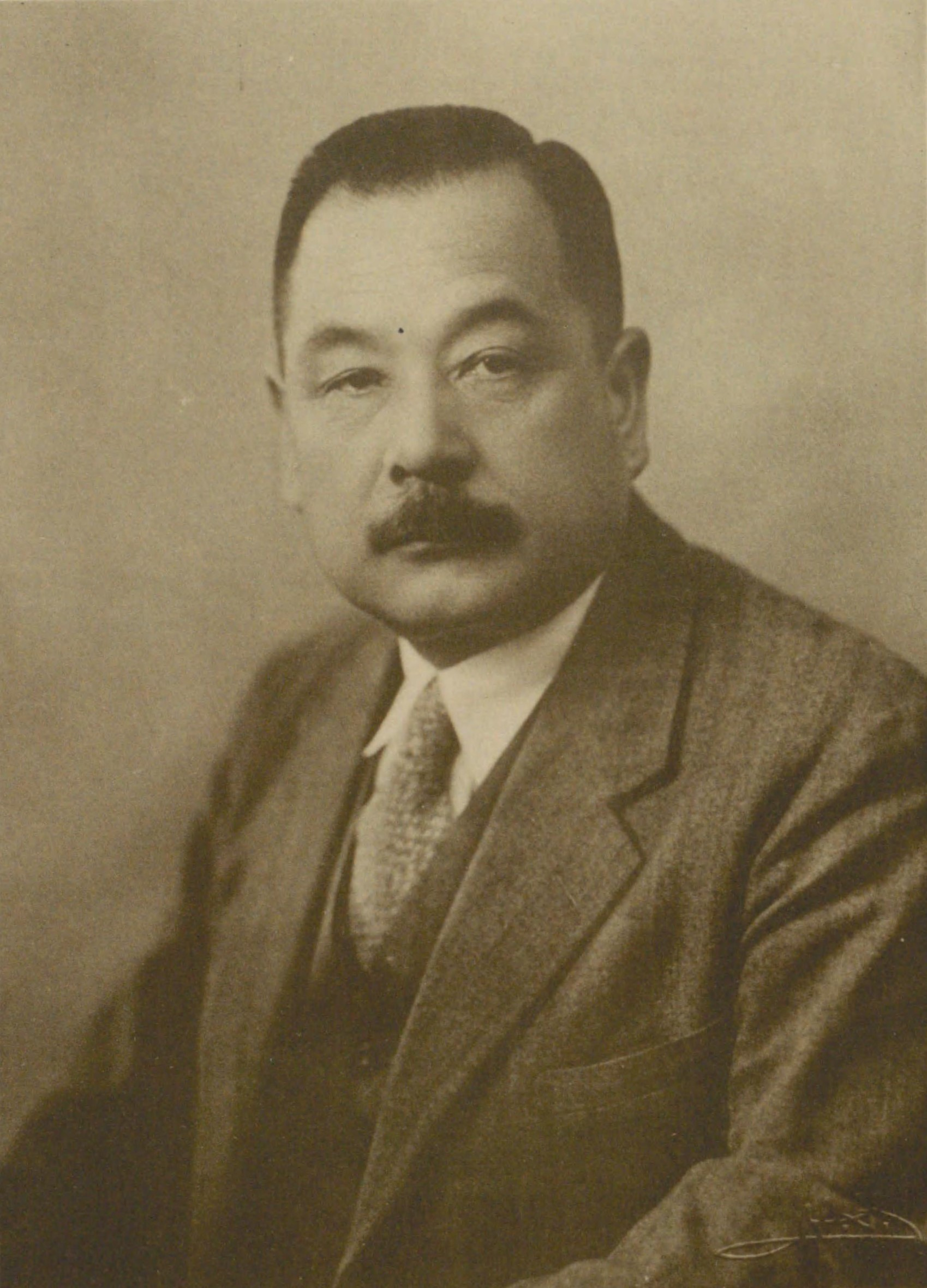
Noritsugu Hayakawa, renowned for funding and supervising the construction of Ginza Line. For this reason, he can be seen as the "father" of the subway in Japan.

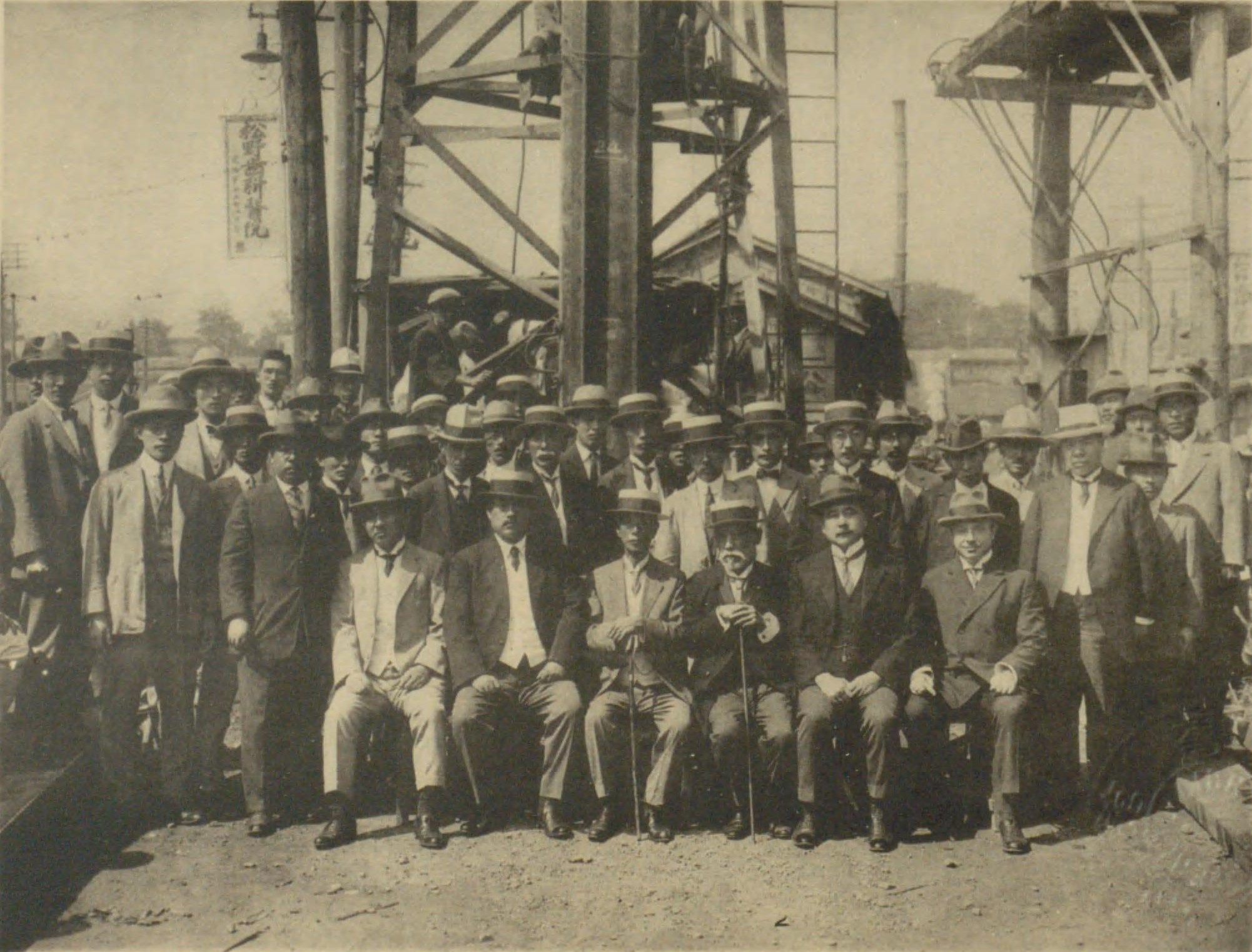
Groundbreaking ceremony of Ginza Line, the oldest subway line in Asia, 1925.

The first subway in Asia (the current Tokyo Metro Ginza Line) opened in 1927. The first trolleybus appeared in 1928.

In the territories of the Japanese Empire at the time, railways in Korea, Taiwan, and Sakhalin were built by the Japanese. In Manchukuo, a nation in Northeast China virtually controlled by the Japanese, South Manchuria Railway operated its railway network.

One of the achievements in this period in railway technology was the conversion of link and pin couplers of locomotives and cars to automatic couplers in July 1925 in Honshū and Kyūshū after considerable preparation. On April 1, 1930, the Ministry of Railways adopted the metric system, replacing Imperial units, for the measuring of railways.

- 1895 – Acquisition of railway in Taiwan
- 1899 – Opening of Keijin Railway, first railway in Korea
- 1906 – Opening of first railway in Karafuto
- 1906 – Foundation of South Manchuria Railway
- 1906–1907 – Nationalization of 17 private railways
- 1910 – Light Railway Act
- 1914 – Opening of Tokyo Station
- 1925 – Introduction of automatic couplers to a national network
- 1925 – Inauguration of the Yamanote Loop Line
- 1927 – Opening of Tokyo subway, the first subway in the East
- 1930 – Adoption of the metric system

=== Wartime situation ===
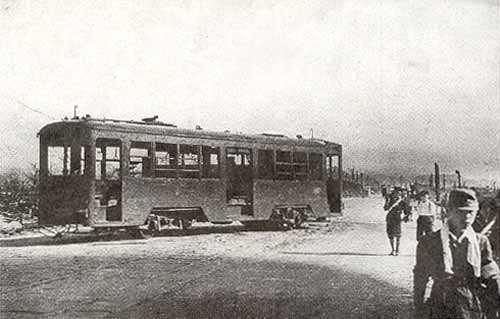
Hiroshima streetcar No.651 destroyed by A-bomb. This car was repaired and was used after the war.

After the start of the Second Sino-Japanese War and the Pacific War (World War II), the railways came under military control. In 1938, the government decided to unify private railways into regional blocks, making larger companies such as Tokyo Kyuko Electric Railway (called Great Tōkyū in comparison with postwar Tōkyū) and Kinki Nippon Railway.

In this period there was a second wave of nationalization. Twenty-two railway companies were forcibly acquired by the government in 1943 and 1944. Unlike the first wave in 1906–1907, which integrated trunk lines into government control, this wave mainly targeted railways with industrial value. The acquired lines include the Tsurumi Line, the Hanwa Line and the Iida Line.

On October 11, 1942, the Ministry of Railways adopted the 24-hour clock following its use in the military.

From 1943, the national railway reduced its civilian passenger service, giving priority to military transport. In 1944, it abolished all the limited express trains, first-class cars, dining cars, and sleeping cars. Under the Ordinance for Collection of Metals (金属類回収令, Kinzokurui Kaishū Rei; Imperial Ordinance No. 835 of 1941), some railway operators were forced to remove one track from double track lines and others were forced to discontinue their business to satisfy the military demand for steel.

On January 29, 1940, a train fire at Ajikawaguchi Station on the Nishinari Line resulted in 189 deaths. This is the deadliest rail accident in Japan if excluding the explosion of a military train of the Okinawa Prefectural Railways on December 11, 1944, that resulted in about 220 deaths.

The war, especially strategic bombings by the United States, damaged the railways heavily. The worst case was in Okinawa, which lost its railways until the opening of Okinawa Urban Monorail in 2003. In most cases, railways resumed operations fairly quickly. Some lines of the national railway resumed after the day of Tokyo bombing. San'yō Main Line resumed two days after the atomic bombing in Hiroshima, while Hiroshima Electric Railway resumed three days after.

- 1942 – Adoption of the 24-hour clock
- 1942 – Opening of Kanmon Tunnel connecting Honshū and Kyūshū
- 1945 – End of World War II; railways were severely damaged

== Stage 3, 1945–1987: Post-war recovery and development ==
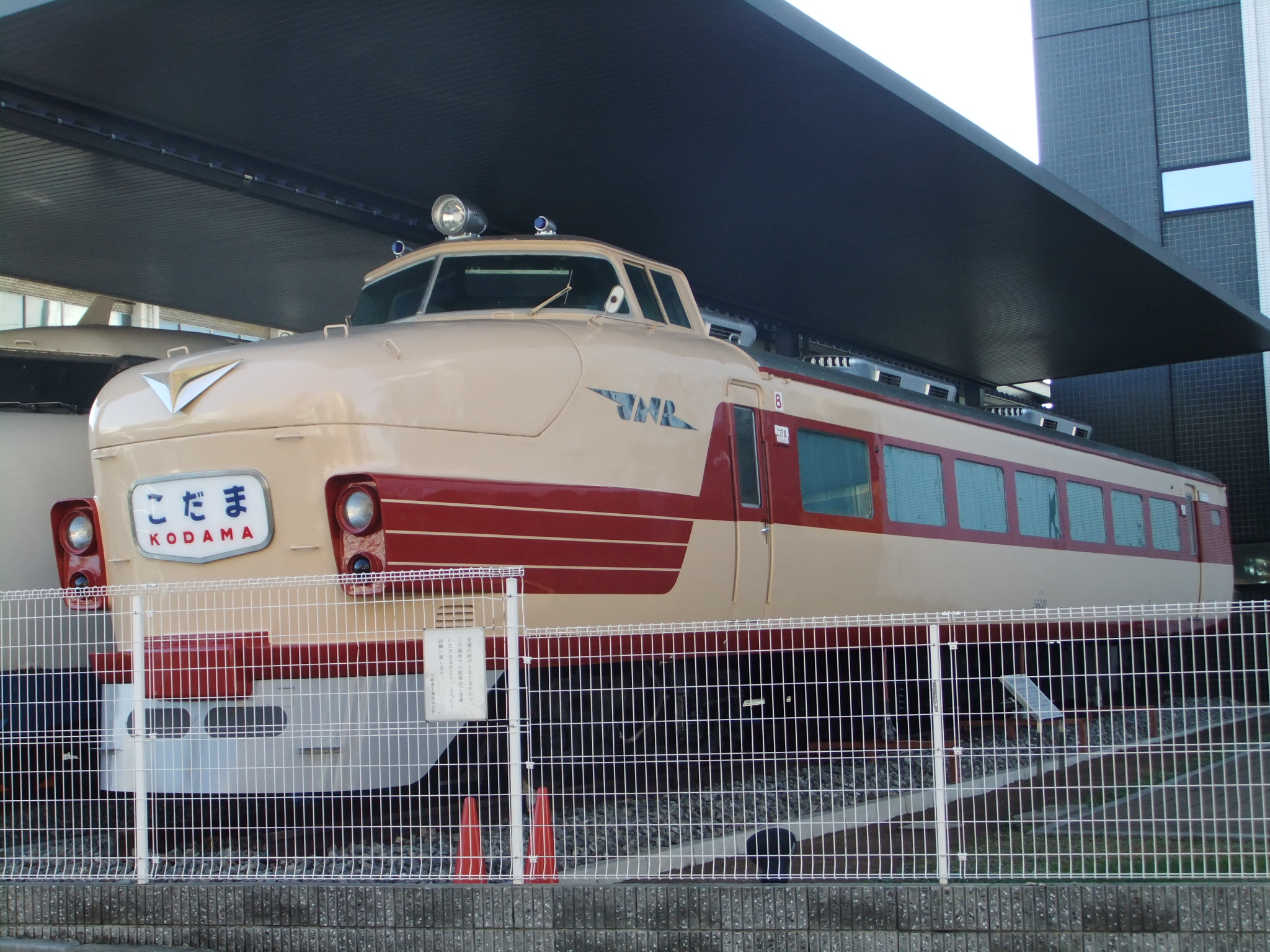
Kodama, debuted in 1958, was the first EMU limited express train by JNR, linking Tokyo and Osaka.

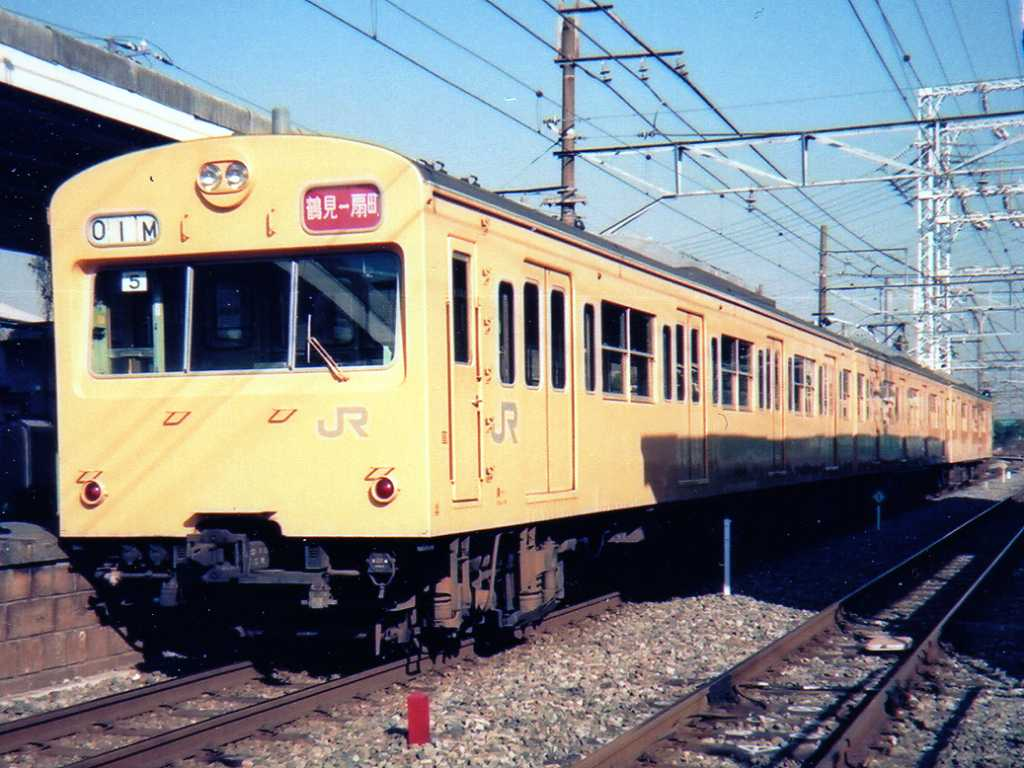
101 series EMU, an innovative commuter train, debuted in 1957.

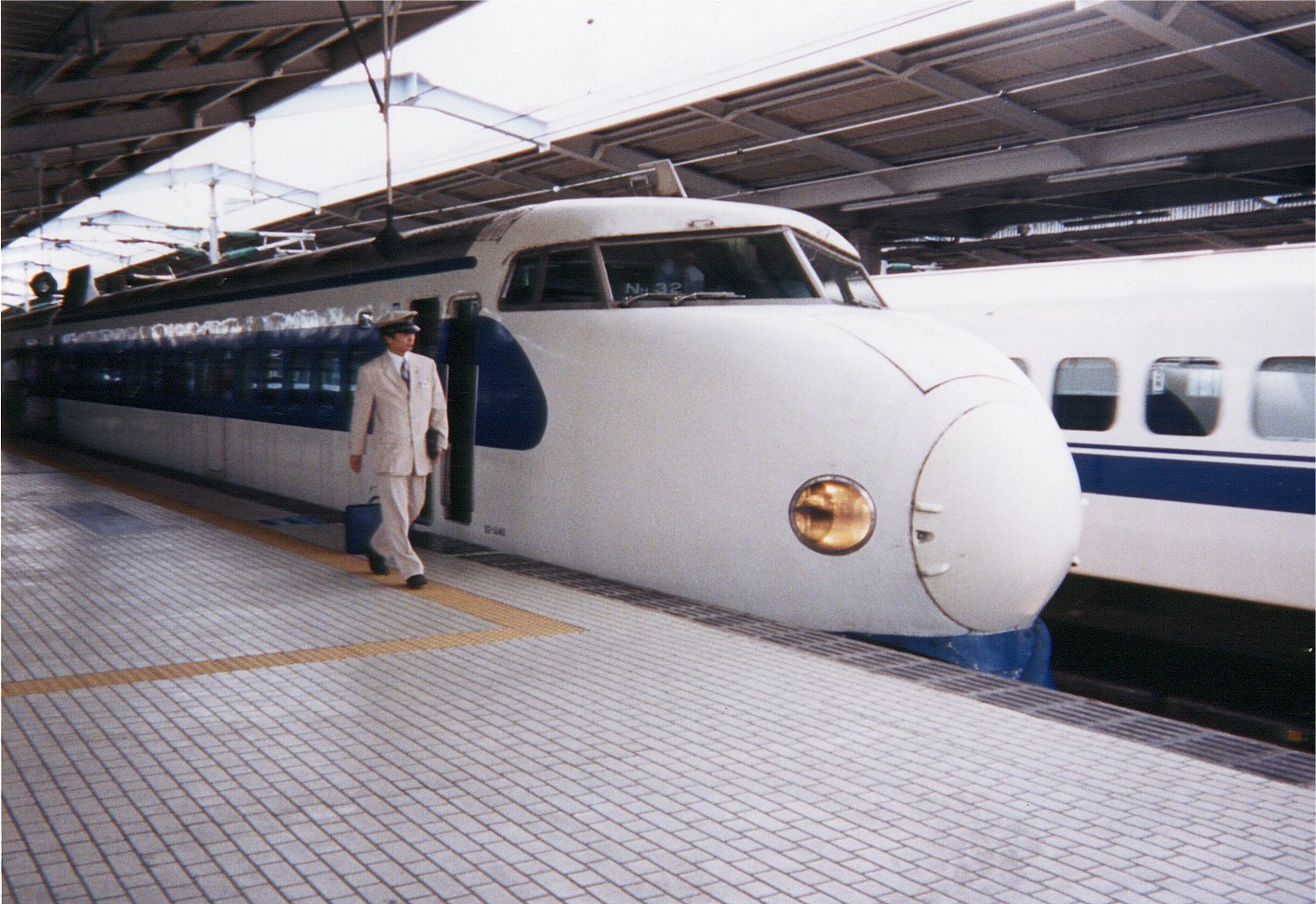
Tōkaidō Shinkansen made its first service in 1964.

It took several more years for the railways to fully recover. After the defeat, the lack of materials caused facilities to not be properly maintained. The lack of materials necessitated people buying wholesale resulting in a rapid increase in passengers. Train services were further reduced due to the lack of coal. Overcrowded trains resulted in numerous accidents. Transport related to U.S. General HQ (GHQ) was given priority, with many "Allies Personnel Only" trains.

In 1949, under the directive of the GHQ, Japanese Government Railways, which had been directly operated by the Ministry of Transport, was reorganized as Japanese National Railways (JNR), a statutory corporation.

Beginning in the 1950s, the electrification of trunk lines began to progress. Electrification of Tōkaidō Main Line was completed in 1956, the San'yō Main Line in 1964, and the Tōhoku Main Line in 1968. In 1954, the government decided to abolish steam haulage, and most were decommissioned by 1976. Many trains were converted from locomotive-hauled services to electric or diesel multiple units. The "New Performance Trains" (新性能電車, Shin-seinō densha), such as 101 series EMU developed in 1957, symbolize the phenomenon.

The 1960s saw great improvement in the economy, including the railways. The Tōkaidō Shinkansen, the first modern high-speed rail line, opened in 1964. Many limited express trains and overnight trains started to cross the nation, marking the golden age of railways.

However, Japan finally began to experience motorization, and tram networks in cities were treated as obstacles to vehicles. They quickly disappeared, partly replaced by rapidly built subway networks. The first monorail, the Ueno Zoo Monorail, opened in 1957.

With the expanding economy, the number of commuters using railways rapidly increased, especially in the Greater Tokyo Area. JNR tried to increase its capacity by the Five Directions of Commuting Campaign (通勤五方面作戦, Tsūkin Go-hōmen Sakusen) to redevelop major five lines in the area by making them quadruple track. This improved passenger flow through the network tremendously.

The cost of the campaign and the construction of the Shinkansen and other lines further increased debt. The confrontation between the unions and management was serious, resulting in many strikes. To resolve the situation, JNR was privatized in 1987, separated into seven separate companies known collectively as the Japan Railways Group (JR Group).

- 1949 – Foundation of Japanese National Railways as public corporation
- 1956 – Completion of electrification of the Tōkaidō Main Line
- 1957 – Opening of Ueno Zoo Monorail, Japan's first monorail
- 1958 – Kodama, the first EMU express between Tokyo and Osaka
- 1960 – Hatsukari, the first DMU express between Ueno (Tokyo) and Aomori
- 1964 – Opening of the first Shinkansen line, between Tokyo and Shin-Osaka
- 1975 – Retirement of steam locomotives from all JNR services (switchers remained until 1976)
- 1980 – JNR Reconstruction Act; low-profit lines were to be abandoned
- 1981 – Opening of Portliner, Japan's first Automated guideway transit
- 1987 – Privatization of JNR, succeeded by the Japan Railways Group
- 1988 – Opening of Seikan Tunnel connecting Honshū and Hokkaidō
- 1988 – Opening of Great Seto Bridge connecting Honshū and Shikoku

== Stage 4, 1987–present: The current situation ==
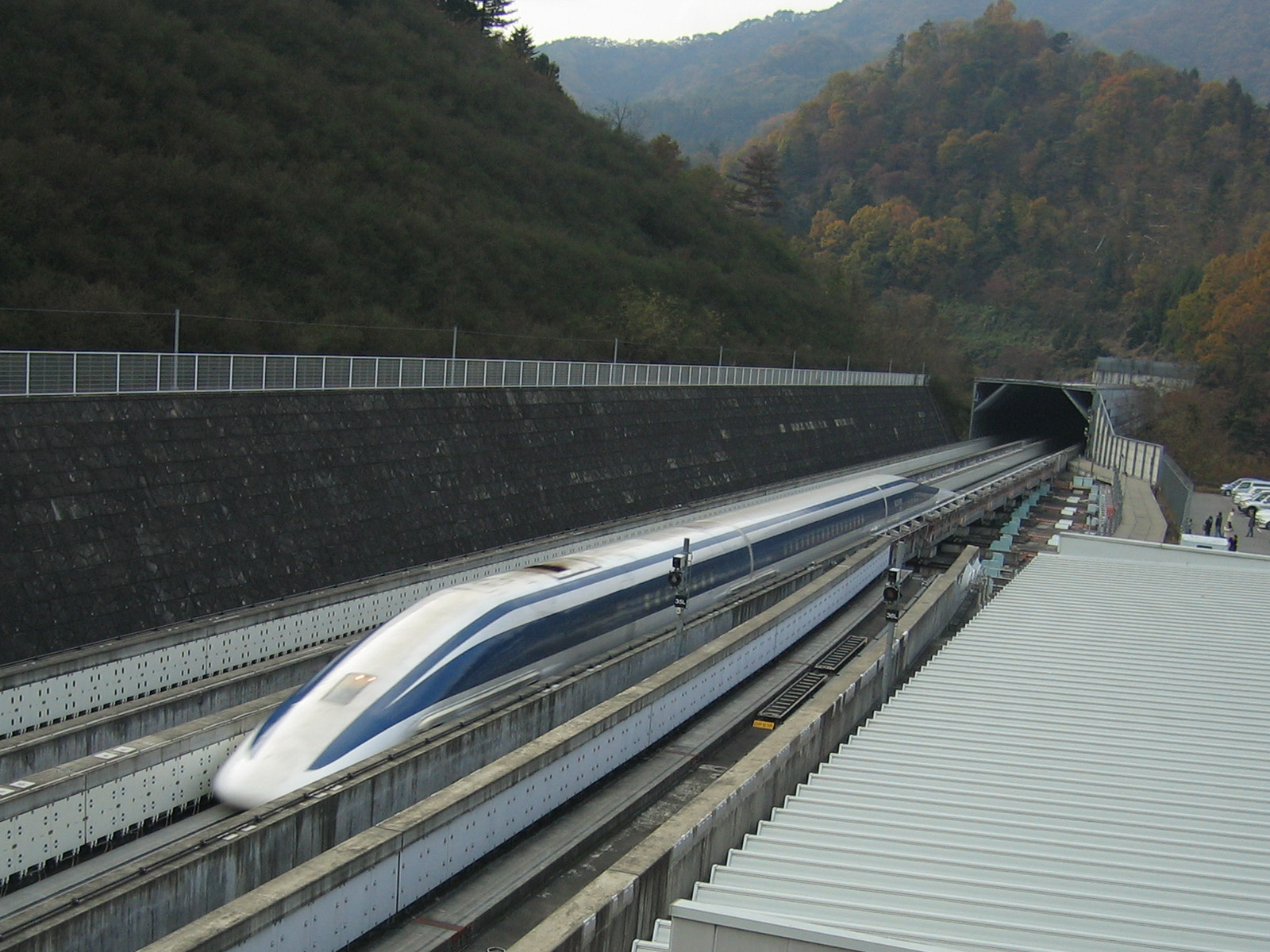
SCMaglev train on the Yamanashi test track

After the privatization, the JR Group companies tried to improve their services, some of them being successful. At the same time, many local lines with lower ridership closed, since JRs are now private companies. Decades after motorization, railways in the countryside, often inconvenient with infrequent services, became less important for locals. The share of railways in total passenger kilometres fell from 66.7 percent in 1965 to 42 percent in 1978 and 29.8 percent in 1990.

Fierce competition between railway operators put a great emphasis on efficiency, possibly more so than safety. Some think the Amagasaki derailment in 2005, which killed more than 100 passengers, is the result of such a trend.

Rail transport in Japan retains its reputation for efficiency, capacity, punctuality, and technology through continuous improvements. The Port Liner, one of the first Automated guideway transit systems in the world, opened in 1981. In 1988 the zairaisen (3'6" gauge) networks of Hokkaido and Shikoku were connected to Honshu following the opening of the Seikan Tunnel (the longest railway tunnel in the world until 2016) and the Great Seto Bridge, with the Shinkansen network extended to Hakodate following the dual-gauging of the Seikan Tunnel in 2016. SCMaglev reached its world record speeds of 581 km/h (361 mph) in 2003 and 603 km/h (375 mph) in 2015, while the much slower Linimo, debuted in 2005, is the first maglev metro in the world.

The development of Japan since 1872 is analogous to that of its rail network. Over this period, railways became the most important means of transport – especially for the movement of passengers – and they retain this role in larger cities today. With many suburban cities having been developed by railway operators, the unchallenged importance of rail is something unique in the world.

== See also ==
- Rail transportation in Okinawa
- Rail transport in Japan
- History of rail transport
- History of rail transport by country
