= JGR Class 150 =

Japanese 2-4-0T steam locomotive

Class 150
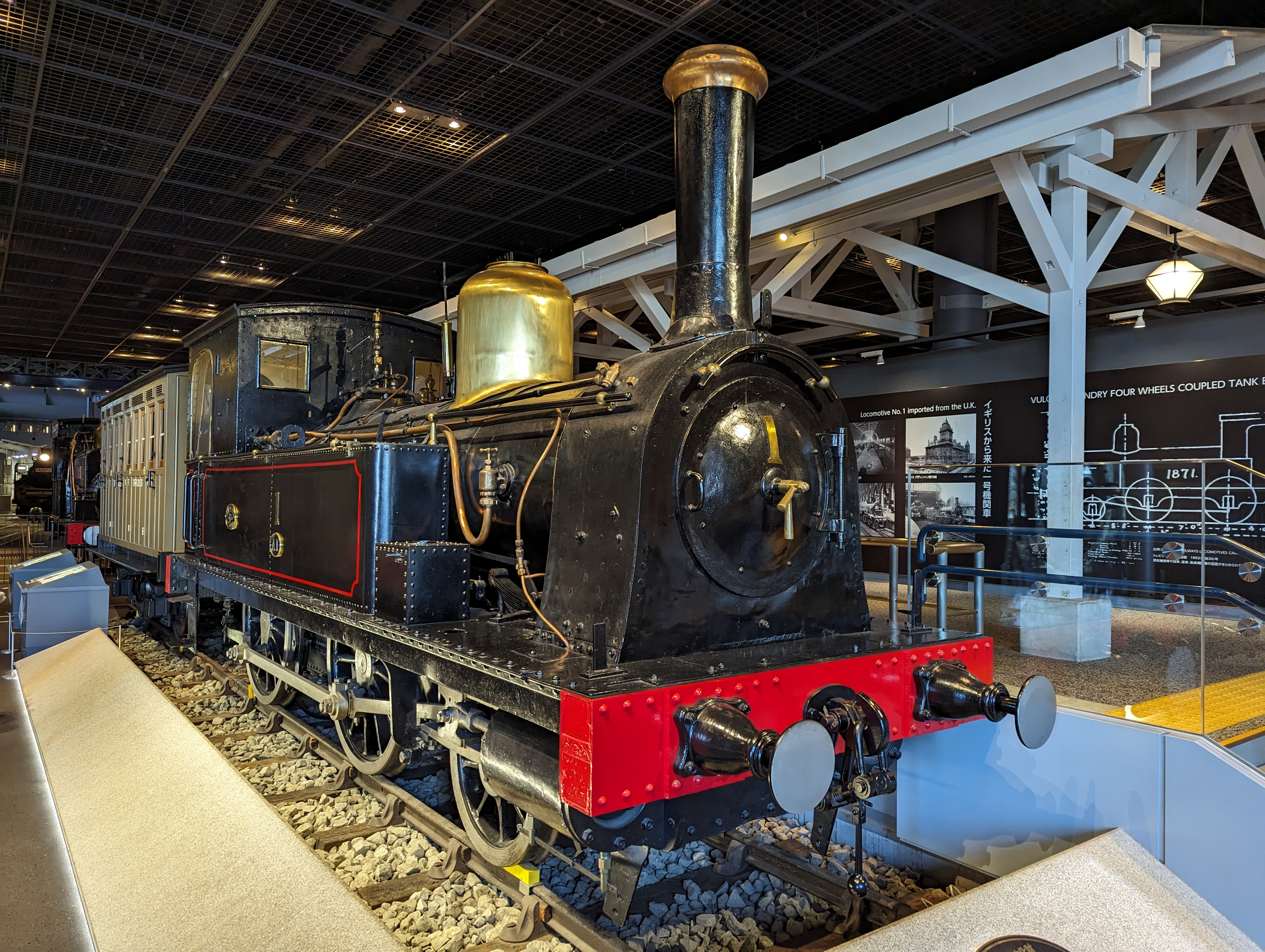
- Locomotive No. 1 in the Railway Museum in Saitama.
Type and origin
- Specifications are after modification, based on 1909 edition of JGR type drawings.
- Power type: Steam
- Builder: Vulcan Foundry, UK
- Serial number: 614
- Build date: 1871
- Total produced: 1
Specifications
- Configuration
  - Whyte: 2-4-0T
- Gauge: 1,067 mm (3 ft 6 in)
- Leading dia.: 838 mm (33.0 in)
- Driver dia.: 1,321 mm (52.0 in) (Listed as 1,295 mm (51.0 in) in 1892 edition of JGR type drawings.)
- Wheelbase: 2.134 m (7 ft 0 in) between driving axles
- Length: 7.417 m (24 ft 4.0 in)
- Height: 3.569 m (11 ft 8.5 in)
- Axle load: 9.09 t (8.95 long tons; 10.02 short tons) (on 1st driving axle)
- Adhesive weight: 17.58 t (17.30 long tons; 19.38 short tons)
- Loco weight: 23.45 t (23.08 long tons; 25.85 short tons)
- Fuel type: Coal
- Fuel capacity: 0.51 t (0.50 long tons; 0.56 short tons)
- Water cap.: 2.05 m^{3} (450 imp gal; 540 US gal)
- Firebox
  - Grate area: 0.81 m^{2} (8.7 sq ft)
- Boiler pressure: 9.84 kgf/cm^{2} (140.0 psi)
- Heating surface: 52.2 m^{2} (562 sq ft)
- Cylinders: 2
- Cylinder size: 305 mm × 457 mm (12.0 in × 18.0 in)
- Valve gear: Stephenson
Performance figures
- Tractive effort: 2,690 kgf (26,400 N; 5,930 lbf) (at 85% boiler pressure)
Career
- Operators: Japanese Government Railways (up to 1911); Shimabara Railway (from 1911 on)
- Class: E (1894–1898); A1 (1898–1909); 150 (from 1909 on)
- First run: 1872
- Retired: 1930
- Current owner: Railway Museum, Saitama
- Disposition: Preserved

The JGR Class 150 (国鉄150形, Kokutetsu 150 gata), also known in Japan as Locomotive No. 1 (1号機関車, Ichi-gō kikansha), is a British-built tank steam locomotive of 2-4-0T wheel arrangement, imported in 1871 by Meiji-era Japan for its first railway between Tokyo and Yokohama which opened in 1872. Locomotive No. 1 was Japan's first locomotive to run in regular service, operating on the Japanese Government Railways from 1872 to 1911 and on the private Shimabara Railway in Nagasaki Prefecture from 1911 to 1930, when it was retired and preserved for its historic importance. In 1997 it became Japan's first railway vehicle to be designated as a national Important Cultural Property. Today it is preserved in the Railway Museum in Saitama.

== Design ==
Like the other locomotives first ordered for the Tokyo-Yokohama line, Locomotive No. 1 is a tank locomotive with side tanks, a rear coal bunker, and a wheel arrangement of 2-4-0T, with modest-sized coupled driving wheels of 1,321 mm (52.0 in) in diameter. This configuration was popular at the time in Britain, Europe, and elsewhere for locomotives that would haul either passengers or freight over short runs, and also for shunting. No. 1 is a typical steam locomotive for its era, having two cylinders with no compounding or superheating, and equipped with the widely used Stephenson valve gear and a Salter-type spring balance safety valve for the boiler.

During its long career, this locomotive was heavily modified, and for most of that time it looked considerably different from when it was first built.

== History ==
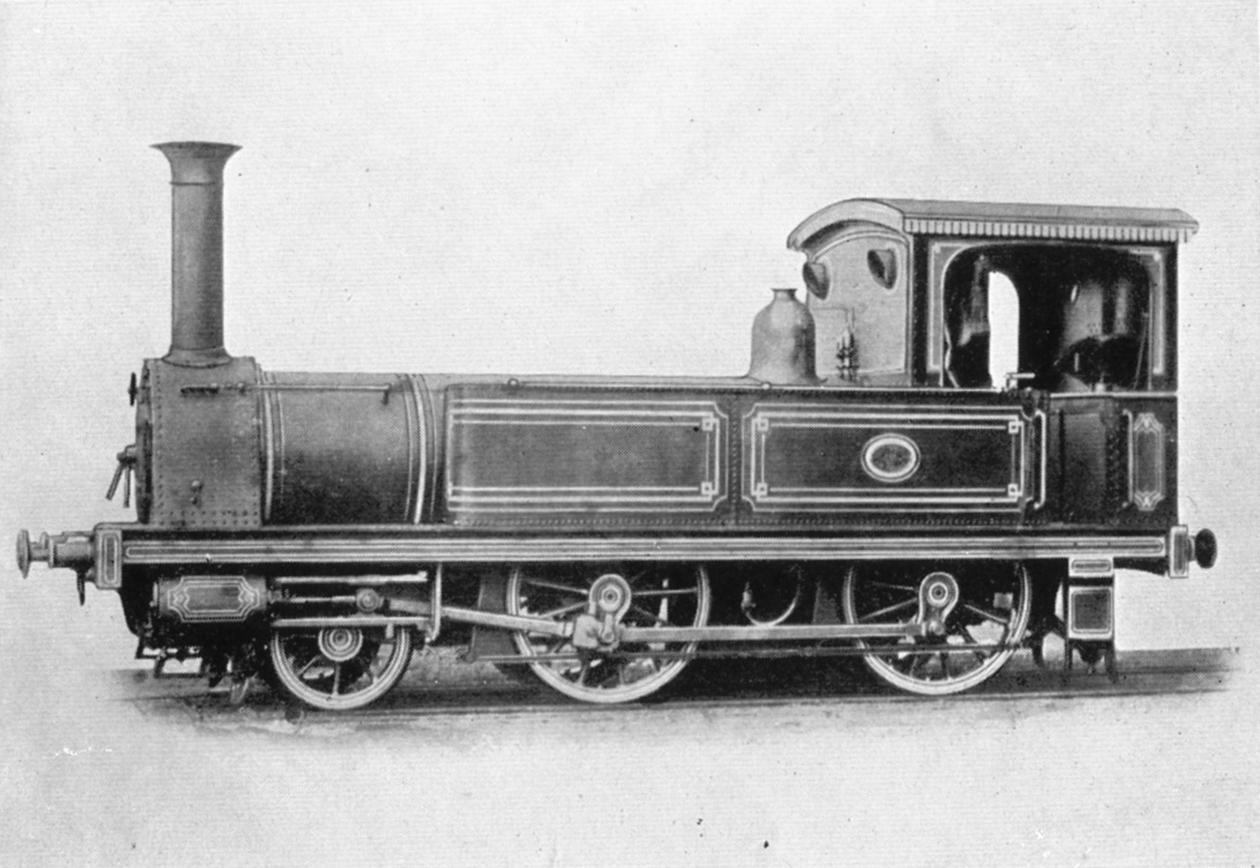
Locomotive No. 1 as originally built in 1871

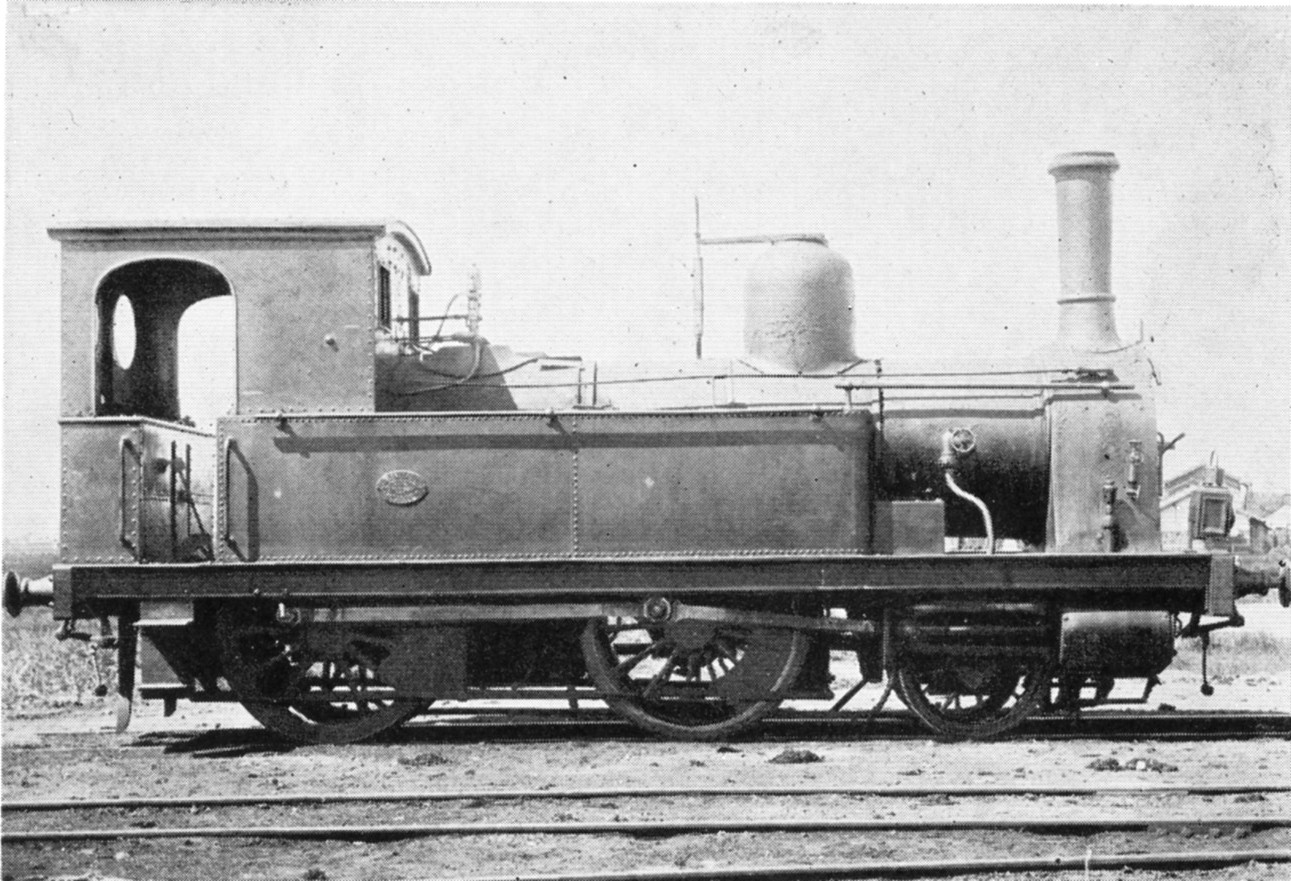
The same locomotive as modified by the JGR in later years

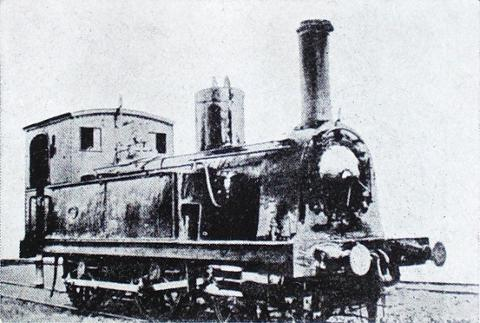
The locomotive with the Shimabara Railway, further modified

Japan's first railway line was between Tokyo's original Shimbashi Station (later renamed to Shiodome Station) and the original Yokohama Station (today's Sakuragichō Station). For this line, ten locomotives of five different types were ordered in 1871 from builders in the United Kingdom, including one from Vulcan Foundry. Vulcan's locomotive (serial number 614), the only one of its type, was the first to arrive in Japan and was designated No. 1. Although the Shimbashi-Yokohama railway's official opening was on 14 October 1872, (Note: All dates here are in the Gregorian calendar rather than the lunisolar Tenpō calendar still in use in Japan until 1873.) the locomotive may have entered service somewhat sooner, since provisional service on the railway began on 12 June 1872 between Tokyo's Shinagawa Station and Yokohama.

The locomotive was used for both passenger and freight service. However, its performance was less than satisfactory, and it seems the railway struggled to improve it. Its mileage from August 1872 to June 1885 was 104,641 miles (168,403 km); this was slightly less than half that of locomotives no. 2–9 (the future JGR Classes 160, A3, and 190) and about twice that of no. 10 (the future JGR Class 110), which was said to have had the worst performance.

After being used between Shimbashi and Yokohama for about eight years, in November 1880 the locomotive was transferred to the Kobe area of what would later become the Tōkaidō Main Line. Between July 1884 and June 1885, several modifications were made to it at the Kobe works. The cab, which was originally quite open, was made more enclosed, and the boiler was raised by 209 mm (8 1/4 in). The steam dome that was originally located just in front of the cab was moved to the middle of the boiler, and a whistle was installed in the dome's former position. In 1885, after this extensive remodeling, Locomotive No. 1 was sent to Handa in Aichi Prefecture and used to transport construction materials for the Nakasendō trunk line project (which was later abandoned). In 1905, No. 1 was confirmed to be used exclusively for shunting in the Osaka area.

In Japan's first official locomotive classification in 1894, Locomotive No. 1 was assigned to Class E. In the 1898 classification by the Railway Works Bureau (鉄道作業局, tetsudō-sagyō-kyoku), it was reassigned to Class A1. It was consistently numbered as "No. 1" to the end of the Railway Works Bureau in 1907. Following the enactment of the Railway Nationalization Act in 1906 and the creation of the Railway Bureau (鉄道院, tetsudō-in), when this organization adopted new regulations in 1909 for numbering and classifying locomotives, the former "No. 1" became "No. 150" of Class 150.

On 1 April 1911, the locomotive was transferred to the private Shimabara Railway in Nagasaki Prefecture for the opening of their line; it was redesignated "No. 1" by that company and again used to haul both passengers and freight in general service. The company made several more alterations to it. They installed metal clamp fittings on the front smokebox door, like those on U.S. locomotives, and replaced the steam dome cover with a crude cylindrical one. The original square sandboxes that were located in front of the side tanks were removed, and between the dome and the whistle was installed a German-style sandbox. (This is thought to have been reused from a former Kyushu Railway Krauss steam locomotive that had been disposed of by the Railway Bureau.)

At the beginning of the Shōwa era in the late 1920s, early railway journalist Kaizō Aoki started a campaign to return the valuable Locomotive No. 1 to the Ministry of Railways and preserve it. As a result, in 1930 it was decided that No. 1 would be returned to the ministry, with JGR Class 600 No. 656 to be given in exchange, the exchange being made because Shimabara Railway thought No. 1 could still be put to good use. On 3 July 1930, a grand farewell ceremony for No. 1 was held at Isahaya Station in Nagasaki Prefecture, and the locomotive was handed over to the Ministry of Railways with a nobori banner reading "Sending off National Treasure Locomotive No. 1" (送国宝一号機関車, Oku kokuhō ichi-gō kikansha). At that time, Shimabara Railway's founder and then-president, Gentarō Ueki, in order to express his gratitude for the locomotive's contributions during the company's early days, had a plaque installed on the left side tank with the handwritten inscription, "With overwhelming feelings of farewell" (惜別感無量, Sekibetsu kanmuryō). This plaque is still attached to the locomotive today.

== Preservation ==
After Locomotive No. 1's return to the JGR, it was repaired at the Omiya Works in Saitama and temporarily exhibited in the "Railway Reference Items Display Site" located within the works. In 1936 it was moved to what was then called the Railway Museum (renamed to the Transportation Museum in 1948) near the Manseibashi bridge in Kanda, Tokyo, and statically preserved there. At one time, it had a steam dome cover taken from a JGR Class 5000 (an 0-4-2 tender locomotive of the same era), but this has since been removed. In addition, the German-style sandbox and other items attached during the Shimabara Railway era have also been removed, and the locomotive has been restored to its pre-Shimabara form. The paint color was black when it was first acquired; in 1971 it was repainted in a green background with yellow lining, reflecting the early days of the railway, (Note: This is based on information in a reply from British Rail to a research request by the Transportation Museum, as part of the ongoing maintenance of classic rolling stock at the time. This information stated that the lining was to be gold leaf, but due to budgetary circumstances, yellow paint was substituted. The cut-out "1" character for the locomotive number and the smokebox door handle were installed at this time.) but in 1984 it was again changed to black. The current paint job is described on an explanatory board as "a reproduction of the appearance around Meiji 30 [1897]".

In 1958 this locomotive was designated as the first Japanese railway monument. On 30 June 1997, it became the first railway vehicle to be designated by Japan as a national Important Cultural Property, under the Historical Materials category. (Its Important Cultural Property designation name is 一号機関車 (Ichi-gō kikansha, "Locomotive No. 1").)

After the Transportation Museum closed on 14 May 2006, Locomotive No. 1 was moved to its current exhibition site, the present-day Railway Museum in Saitama which opened on 14 October 2007.

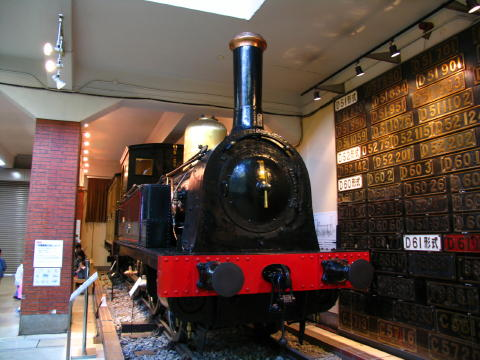
Locomotive No. 1 as displayed at the former Transportation Museum in 2006 just before its closure.

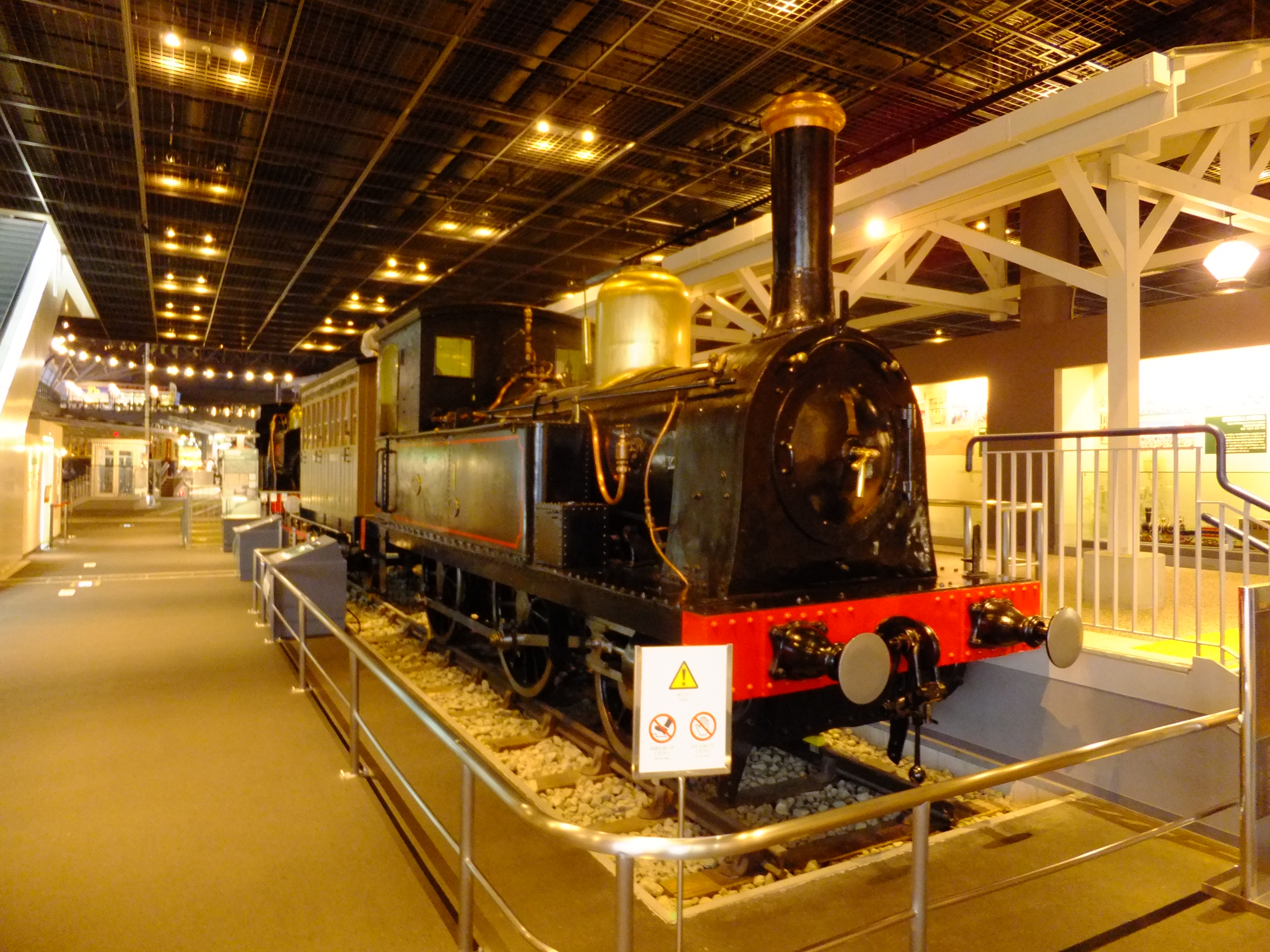
Locomotive No. 1 preserved at the Railway Museum in January 2015.

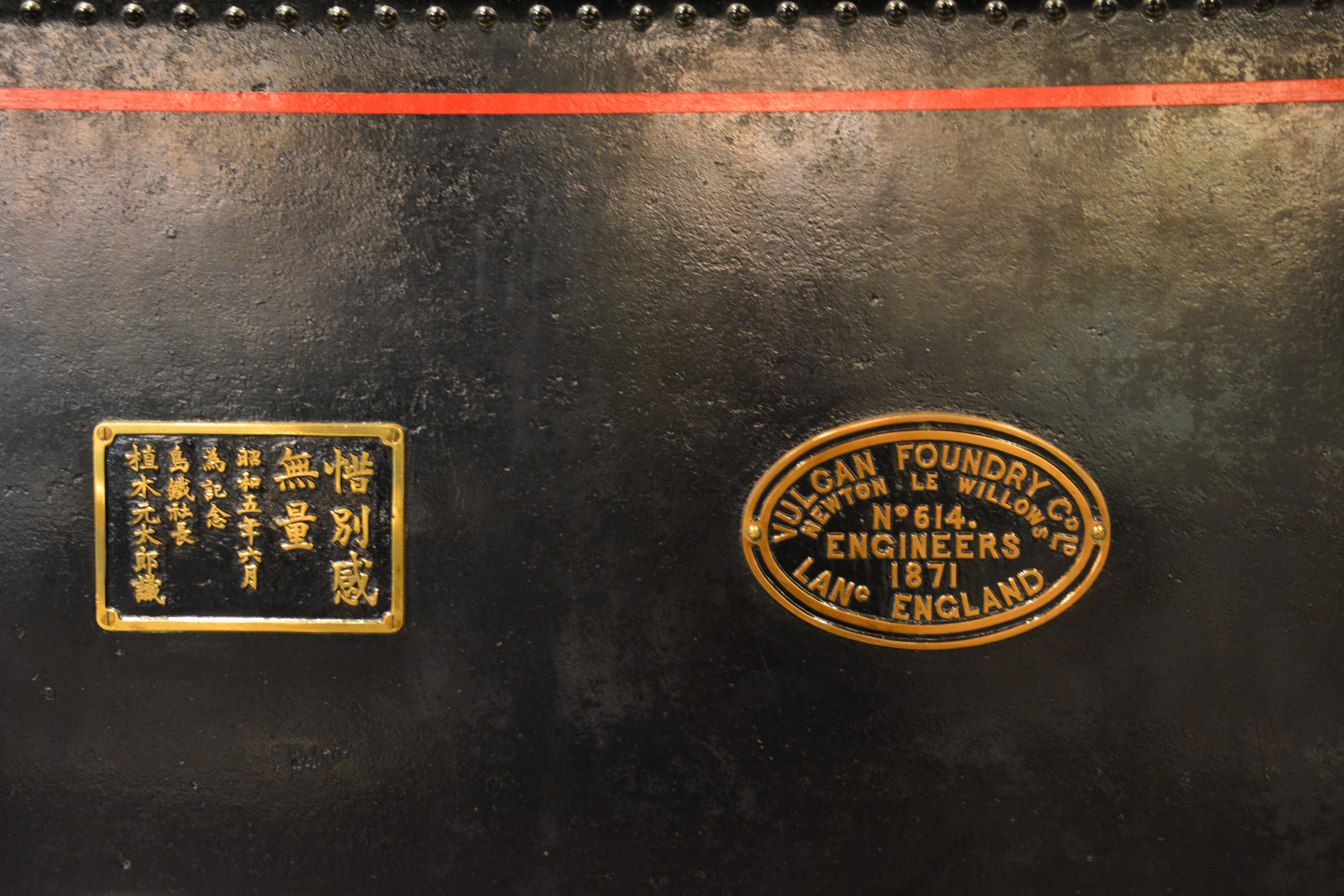
Shimabara Railway farewell memorial plaque and Vulcan Foundry builder's plate on Locomotive No. 1.

== See also ==
- Japan Railways locomotive numbering and classification
- History of rail transport in Japan

== Works cited ==
- Usui, Shigenobu (1968). Nihon jōki kikansha keishiki zu shūsei 日本蒸気機関車形式図集成 [Japanese Steam Locomotive Type Drawing Collection] (in Japanese). Vol. 1. Seibundo Shinkosha.
- Usui, Shigenobu (1972). Kikansha no keifuzu 機関車の系譜図 [Locomotive Genealogy Drawings] (in Japanese). Vol. 1. Koyusha.
- Kaneda, Shigehiro (1984). Keishikibetsu kokutetsu no jōki kikansha 形式別 国鉄の蒸気機関車 [JNR Steam Locomotives by Type] (in Japanese). Vol. 1. Locomotive History Research Society.
- Kaneda, Shigehiro (1988). Sei haimenzu iri jōki kikansha keishikizu shū 正背面図入 蒸気機関車形式図集 [Steam Locomotive Type Diagram Collection with Front and Rear Views] (in Japanese). Vol. 1. Locomotive History Research Society.
- Kaneda, Shigehiro (1990). Nihon saisho no kikanshagun 日本最初の機関車群 [Japan's First Locomotives] (in Japanese). Locomotive History Research Society.
- Kaneda, Shigehiro (1972). Nihon jōki kikanshashi kansetsu tetsudō hen 日本蒸気機関車史 官設鉄道編 [History of Japanese Steam Locomotives: Government Railways] (in Japanese). Koyusha.
- Kawakami, Yukiyoshi (1978). Watakushi no jōki kikanshashi 私の蒸気機関車史 [My History of Steam Locomotives] (in Japanese). Vol. 1. Koyusha.
- Takada, Takao, ed. (1981). Banyū gaido shiriizu 12 jōki kikanshashi nihon hen 万有ガイドシリーズ12 蒸気機関車 日本編 [Universal Guide Series 12: Steam Locomotives, Japan Edition] (in Japanese). Vol. 1. Shogakukan.
- Taguri, Yuichi (January 2002). "1-gō kikansha to Shimabara tetsudō" 1号機関車と島原鉄道 [No. 1 Locomotive and Shimabara Railway]. Tetsudōfan 鉄道ファン [Japan Railfan Magazine] (in Japanese). No. 489. Koyusha. pp. 98–105.
- Tanabe, Yukio (December 1982). "Sharyō totomoni 30 nen - Ōi kōjō OB no omoide banashi #40" 車両とともに30年 - 大井工場ＯＢの思い出ばなし・40 [30 Years with Rolling Stock - Reminiscences of an Oi Factory "Old Boy" #40]. Tetsudōjānaru 鉄道ジャーナル [Railway Journal] (in Japanese). No. 190. pp. 134–141.
