= Railway Construction Act =

The Railway Construction Act (Japanese: 鉄道敷設法, Hepburn: Tetsudō Fusetsu-hō; Law No. 4 of 1892) was promulgated by the Diet of Japan on June 21, 1892, and designated government support for a network of thirty-three railway lines covering most of Japan, with the exception of Hokkaidō. On April 11, 1922, the Diet amended the law to add an additional network of regional and local routes. Today, these lines form the backbone of the national railway network, JR (although JR has relinquished control of some of the more minor ones).

== Lines designated by the Act of 1892 ==
Route	Year Completed	Line name at present
Lines of the central region
Hachiōji or Gotenba — Kōfu — Suwa — Ina District or NishiChikuma District — Nagoya	1911 Hachiōji — Nagoya via NishiChikuma District by national railway	Chūō Main Line
Nagano or Shinonoi (present day in Nagano) — Matsumoto — connect to the previous clause route	1902 Shinonoi — Shiojiri by national railway	Shinonoi Line
Kōfu — Fujikawa	1928 Kōfu — Fuji by private railway, 1941 nationalized	Minobu Line
Line to connect the Central region lines and the Hokuriku region line
Gifu or Matsumoto — Takayama — Toyama	1934 Gifu — Toyama by national railway	Takayama Main Line
Lines of the Hokuriku region
Tsuruga — Kanazawa — Toyama; and branch to Nanao	1899 Tsuruga — Toyama by national railway; 1898 Tsubata — Nanao by private railway but not connected to main line until 1900 in Tsubata, 1907 nationalized	Hokuriku Main Line, Nanao Line
Line to connect the Hokuriku region line and the Echigo region line
Toyama — Naoetsu (present day Jōetsu)	1913 by national railway	Hokuriku Main Line
Line of the Echigo region
Naoetsu or Maebashi or Toyono — Niigata and Shibata	1899 Naoetsu — Nuttari Station in Niigata by private railway, 1907 nationalized; 1912 connected Shibata by national railway; 1931 connected Maebashi by national railway; 1929 connected Toyono partly private railway, 1944 nationalized	Shinetsu Main Line, Jōetsu Line, Iiyama Line
Line to connect the Echigo region line and the Ōu region lines
Shibata — Yonezawa; or, Niitsu — Wakamatsu — Shirakawa or Motomiya	1936 Shibata — Yonezawa by national railway; 1914 Niitsu — Kōriyama including 1906 nationalization section	Uetsu Main Line, Yonesaka Line, West Ban'etsu Line
Lines of the Ōu region (Mutsu Province and Dewa Province)
Fukushima — Yonezawa — Yamagata — Akita — Hirosaki — Aomori; and branch to Sakata	1905 Fukushima — Aomori by national railway; 1914 Shinjō — Sakata by national railway	Ōu Main Line, Rikuu West Line
Sendai or Ishinomaki — Tendō or Kogota — Funagata	1937 Sendai — Yamagata by national railway; 1912 Ishinomaki — Kogota by private railway, 1919 nationalized; 1917 Kogota — Nagasawa Station (in Funagata) — Shinjō by national railway	Senzan Line, Ishinomaki Line, Rikuu East Line
Kitakami or Hanamaki — Yokote	1924 Kitakami — Yokote by national railway	Kitakami Line
Morioka — Miyako or Yamada	1934 Morioka — Miyako, 1935 connected Yamada by national railway	Yamada Line
Lines of the Sōbu region (Shimōsa Province and Musashi Province)
Tokyo — Chiba — Sakura — Chōshi; and branch to Kisarazu	1897 Honjo Station in Tokyo — Chōshi by private railway, 1907 nationalized; 1912 connected Kisarazu including 1907 nationalization section	Sōbu Main Line, Uchibō Line
Line of the Jōban region (Hitachi Province and Iwaki Province)
Mito — Taira — Iwanuma	1898 by private railway, 1906 nationalized	Jōban Line
Lines of the Kinki region
Nara — Tsuge (present day in Iga-City)	1898 by private railway, 1907 nationalized	Kansai Main Line
Osaka or Yagi or Takada — Gojō — Wakayama	1900 Takada — Wakayama by private railways, 1907 nationalized	Wakayama Line
Kyoto — Nara	1896 by private railway, 1907 nationalized	Nara Line
Kyoto — Maizuru	1910 Kyoto — Ayabe including 1907 nationalization section	San'in Main Line
Lines of the San'yō region
Mihara — Shimonoseki	1901 by private railway, 1906 nationalized	San'yō Main Line
Kaitaichi — Kure	1903 by national railway	Kure Line
Line of the San'in region
Maizuru — Toyooka — Tottori — Matsue — Hamada — Yamaguchi	1923 Fukuchiyama — Ogōri by national railway	San'in Main Line, Yamaguchi Line
Lines to connect the Sanyō region and the San'in region
Himeji — Ikuno or Sasayama — Maizuru or Sonobe; or Tsuchiyama (present day eastern border of Kakogawa) — Fukuchiyama — Maizuru	1906 Himeji — Ikuno — Wadayama by private railway, 1906 nationalized; 1904 Amagasaki — Sasayama — Tanikawa — Fukuchiyama — Ayabe — Maizuru by private railway, 1907 nationalized 1924 Kakogawa — Tanikawa by private reilway, 1943 nationalized	Bantan Line, Fukuchiyama Line, Maizuru Line, Kakogawa Line
Himeji — Tottori; or Okayama — Tsuyama — Yonago — Sakai; or Kurashiki or Tamashima (present day in Kurashiki) — Sakai	1936 Himeji — Tsuyama by national railway; 1898 Okayama — Tsuyama by private railway, 1944 nationalized; 1932 Tsuyama — Tottori by national railway; 1928 Kurashiki — Yonago by national railway; 1902 Yonago — Sakai by national railway	Kishin Line, Tsuyama Line, Inbi Line, Hakubi Line
Hiroshima — Hamada	Not completed	
Lines of the Shikoku region
Kotohira — Kōchi — Susaki	1935 by national railway	Dosan Line
Tokushima — connect to the previous clause route	1914 Tokushima — Awa-Ikeda including 1907 nationalization section	Tokushima Line
Tadotsu — Imabari — Matsuyama	1927 by national railway	Yosan Line
Lines of the Kyūshū region
Saga — Sasebo and Nagasaki	1898 via Takeo and Ōmura by private railway, 1907 nationalized; 1934 via Kashima, by national railway	Sasebo Line, Ōmura Line, Nagasaki Main Line
Kumamoto — Uto — Misumi; and branch line as Uto — Yatsushiro — Kagoshima	To Misumi 1899 by private railway, 1907 nationalized; To Kagoshima 1909 via Hitoyoshi and Hayato, including 1907 nationalization section; 1927 via Minamata and Sendai by national railway	Misumi Line, Kagoshima Main Line, Hisatsu Line, Hisatsu Orange Railway
Kumamoto — Ōita	1928 by national railway	Hōhi Main Line
Kokura — Ōita — Miyazaki — Kagoshima	1923 via Kobayashi and Yoshimatsu including nationalization sections; 1932 via Takarabe by national railway	Nippō Main Line, Kitto Line
Iizuka — Haruda (present day Chikushino)	1929 including 1907 nationalization section	Chikuhō Main Line
Kurume — Yamaga — Kumamoto	Not completed	

== Notable main lines before the Act ==
The lines listed below were not covered by the act, since they were already built by that time.

- Tokyo — Gotenba — Nagoya — Gifu — Maibara — Kusatsu — Kyoto — Osaka — Kōbe (Tōkaidō Main Line)
- Tokyo — Hachiōji (Chūō Main Line as Chūō Line Rapid)
- Takasaki — Shinonoi — Nagano — Toyono — Naoetsu (Shin’etsu Main Line)
- Maibara — Tsuruga (Hokuriku Main Line)
- Ōmiya — Takasaki — Maebashi (Takasaki Line)
- Tokyo — Ōmiya — Shirakawa — Fukushima — Iwanuma — Sendai — Kogota — Kitakami — Morioka — Aomori (Tōhoku Main Line)
- Tokyo — Mito (Jōban Line)
- Nagoya — Kameyama — Tsuge — Kusatsu (Kansai Main Line and Kusatsu line)
- Osaka — Ōji — Nara (Tōkaidō Main Line and Nara Line)
- Ōji — Takada
- Kōbe — Himeji — Okayama — Mihara
- Marugame — Tadotsu — Kotohira
- Moji — Kokura — Hakata — Tosu — Kurume — Ōmuta — Kumamoto
- Tosu — Saga
- Wakamatsu — Iizuka

== See also ==
- Railway Nationalization Act
- History of rail transport in Japan
