= Railway Nationalization Act =

Railway Nationalization Act 鉄道国有法

National Diet of Japan
- Territorial extent: Empire of Japan
- Passed by: National Diet of Japan
- Passed: 1906

Related legislation
- Railway Construction Act
- Status: Repealed

The Railway Nationalization Act (鉄道国有法, Tetsudō Kokuyū-hō; Act No. 17 of 1906) was a law enacted by the Diet of Japan that brought many of Japan's private railway lines under national control. The 22nd Diet passed the bill on March 27, 1906 and Emperor Meiji signed on March 30, 1906. The promulgation of the act on the Official Gazette occurred the next day. The Act was repealed by Article 110 of the Act for Enforcement of Japanese National Railways Reform Act Etc. (Act No. 93 of 1986).

The original bill which passed the House of Representatives on March 16, 1906 listed 32 private railways to be nationalized, but the House of Peers amended the bill removing 15 companies from the list on March 27, 1906 and the House of Representatives accepted this amendment the same day.

Between 1906 and 1907, 2,812 miles (4,525 km) of track were purchased from 17 private railway companies. The national railway network grew to about 4,400 miles (7,100 km) of track, and private railways were relegated to providing local and regional services.

Railways nationalized
Date	Railway	Length	
Date	Railway	mi	km
October 1, 1906	Hokkaido Colliery and Railway	204.5	329.1
October 1, 1906	Kōbu Railway	27.8	44.7
November 1, 1906	Nippon Railway	860.8	1,385.3
November 1, 1906	Gan'etsu Railway	49.5	79.7
December 1, 1906	Sanyō Railway	414.9	667.7
December 1, 1906	Nishinari Railway	4.6	7.4
July 1, 1907	Kyūshū Railway	442.8	712.6
July 1, 1907	Hokkaido Railway (1900–1907)	159.0	255.9
August 1, 1907	Kyōto Railway	22.2	35.7
August 1, 1907	Hankaku Railway	70.3	113.1
August 1, 1907	Hokuetsu Railway	85.8	138.1
September 1, 1907	Sōbu Railway	73.2	117.8
September 1, 1907	Bōsō Railway	39.4	63.4
September 1, 1907	Nanao Railway	34.4	55.4
September 1, 1907	Tokushima Railway	21.5	34.6
October 1, 1907	Kansai Railway	275.2	442.9
October 1, 1907	Sangū Railway	26.1	42.0

== See also ==
- Railway Construction Act
- Railway nationalization
- Japanese Government Railways
