= Ikuta Ryokuchi Park =

Park in Tama-ku, Kawasaki, Japan

Coordinates: 35.6094°N 139.5581°E

Ikuta Ryokuchi Park (生田緑地, Ikuta Ryokuchi) is a park in Tama-ku, Kawasaki, Kanagawa Prefecture, Japan.

Among other features, it has an observation platform at the top of Mt. Masugata, the Japan Open-Air Folk Museum with authentic traditional houses, the Kawasaki Municipal Science Museum with a planetarium, the Taro Okamoto Museum of Art, a traditional craft center, and a large rose garden open to the public in the spring and autumn.

The entrance is a fifteen-minute walk from Mukōgaoka-Yūen Station on the Odakyu Odawara Line.

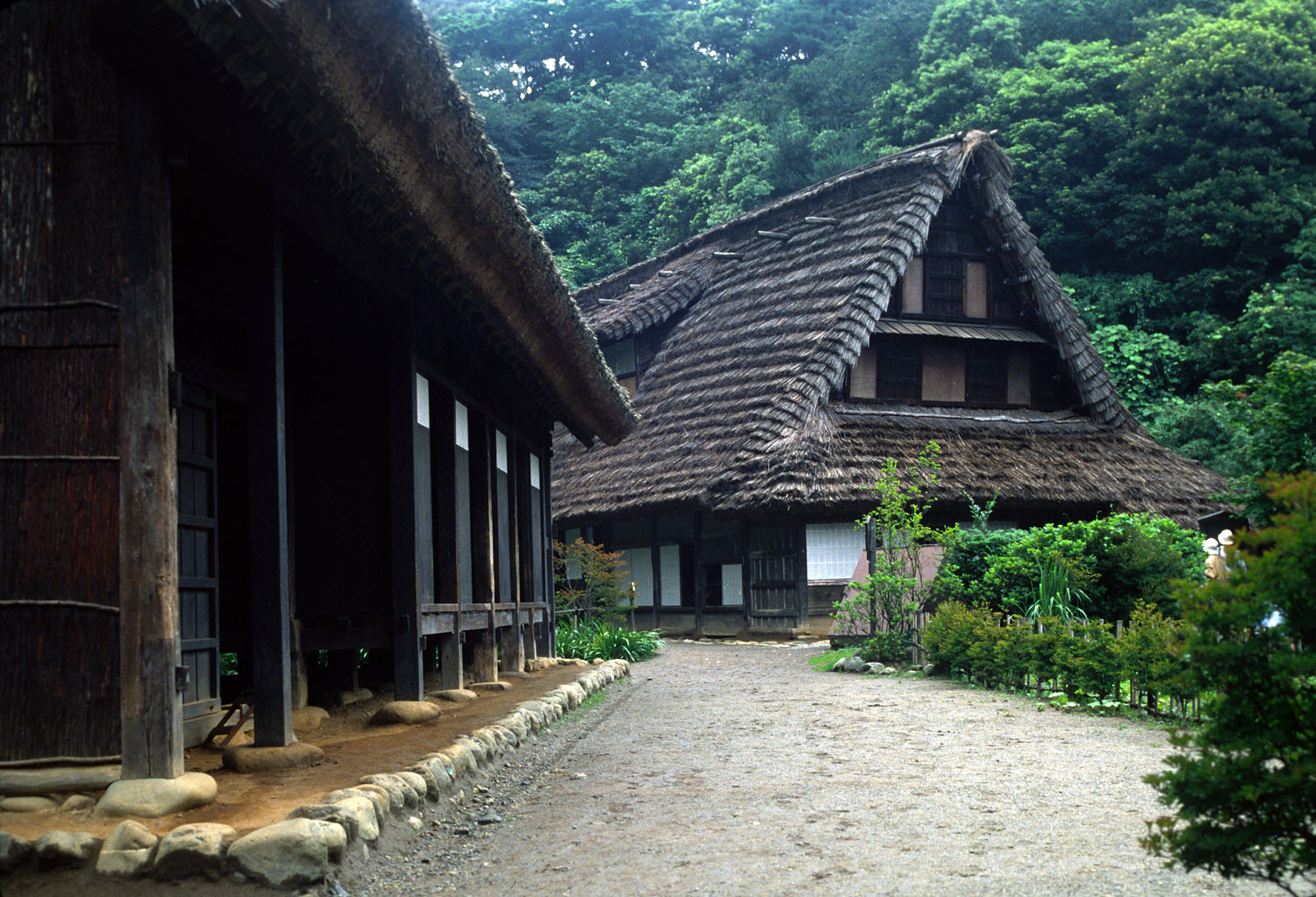
Traditional houses at Nihon Minka-en

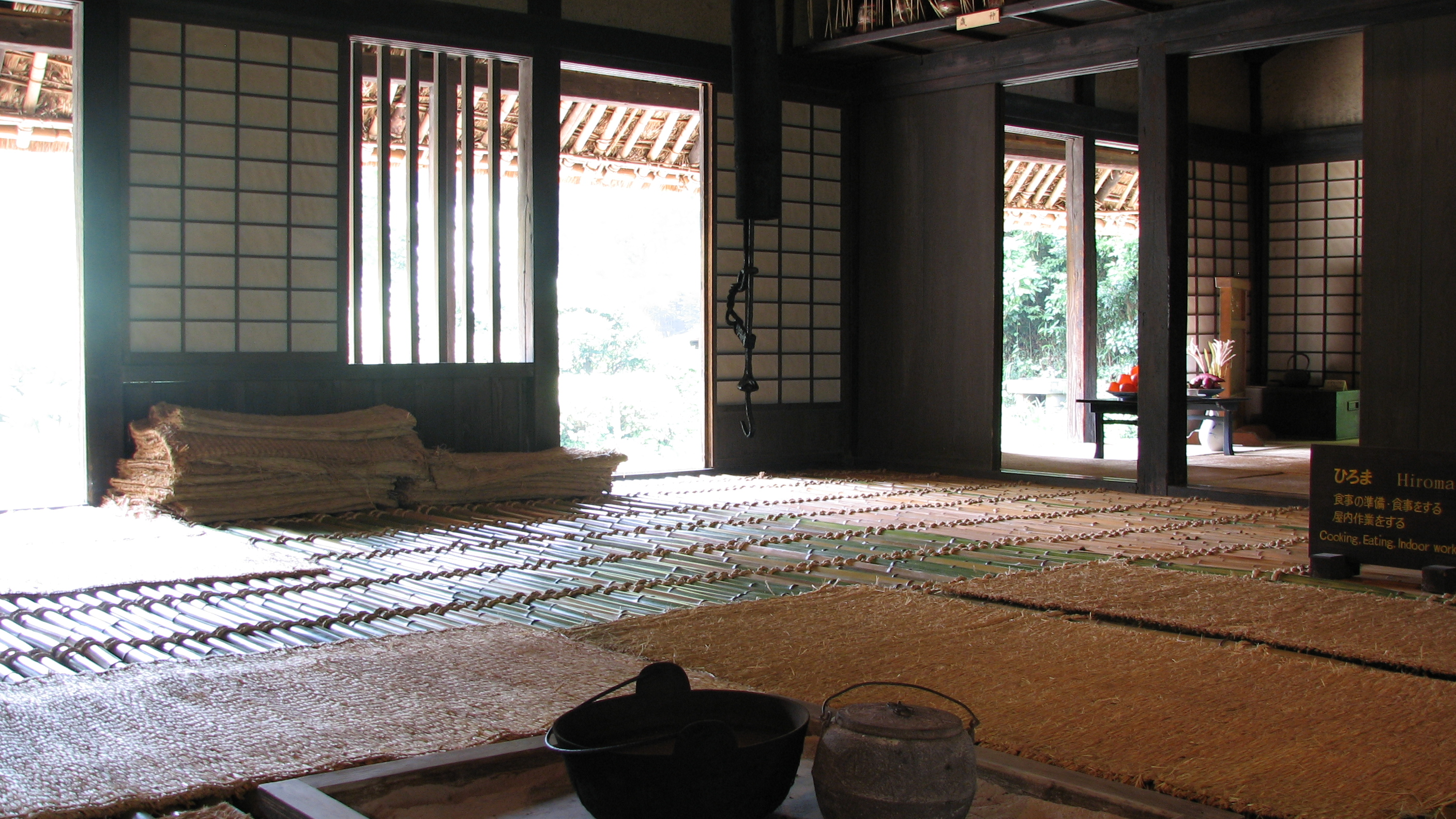
Interior of the Kitamura house at Nihon Minka-en

== Fauna ==
=== Animals ===
- Japanese raccoon dog

=== Wild birds ===
The park contains a bird reserve and a wide variety of birds can be seen in the park.

- Eurasian tree sparrow
- Japanese tit
- Japanese bush warbler
- Japanese white-eye
- Varied tit
- Long-tailed tit
- Japanese pygmy woodpecker
- White-cheeked starling
- Brown-eared bulbul
- Oriental turtle dove
- Azure-winged magpie
- Common kingfisher
- Jungle crow
- Carrion crow

=== Winter birds ===
- Hawfinch
- Dusky thrush
- Red-flanked bluetail
- Eurasian jay

=== Summer birds ===
- Black-faced bunting
