= Yomiuriland-mae Station =

Railway station in Kawasaki, Kanagawa Prefecture, Japan

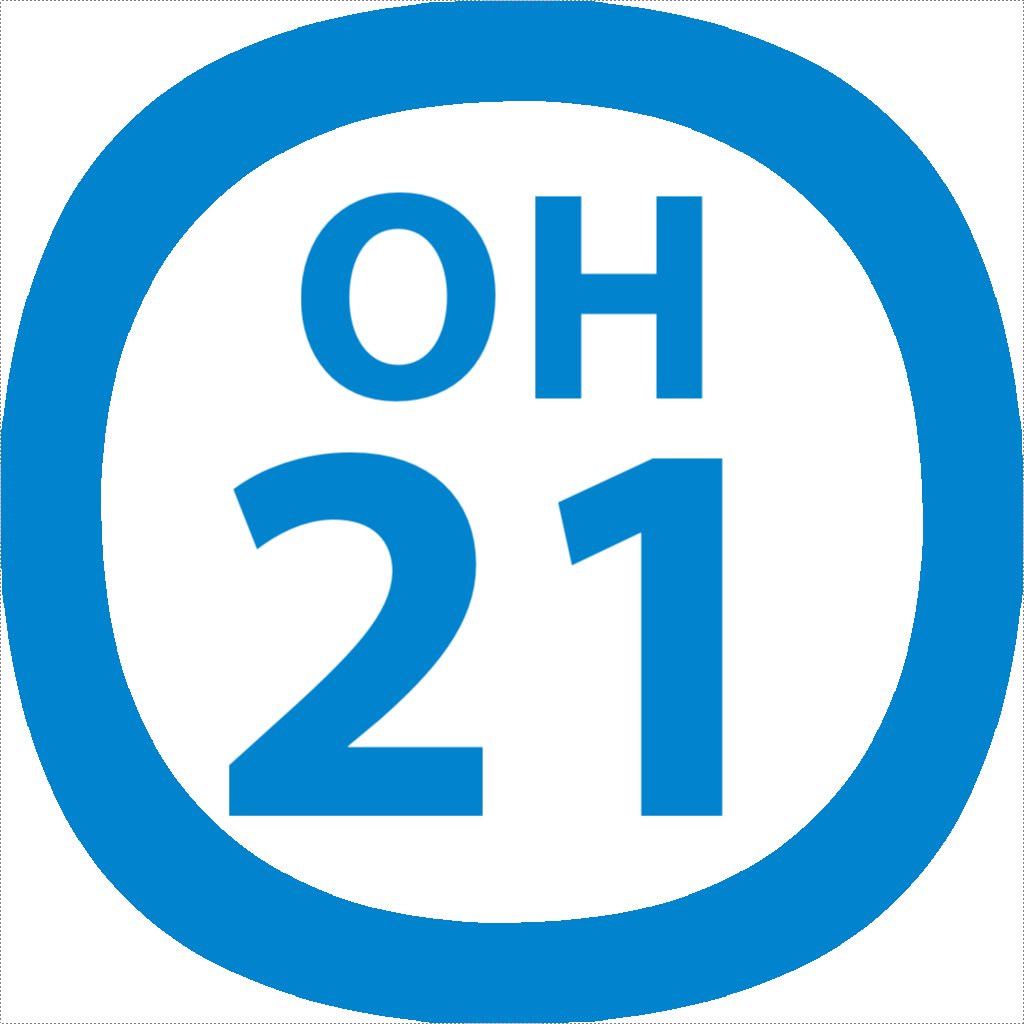
Yomiuriland-mae Station 読売ランド前駅

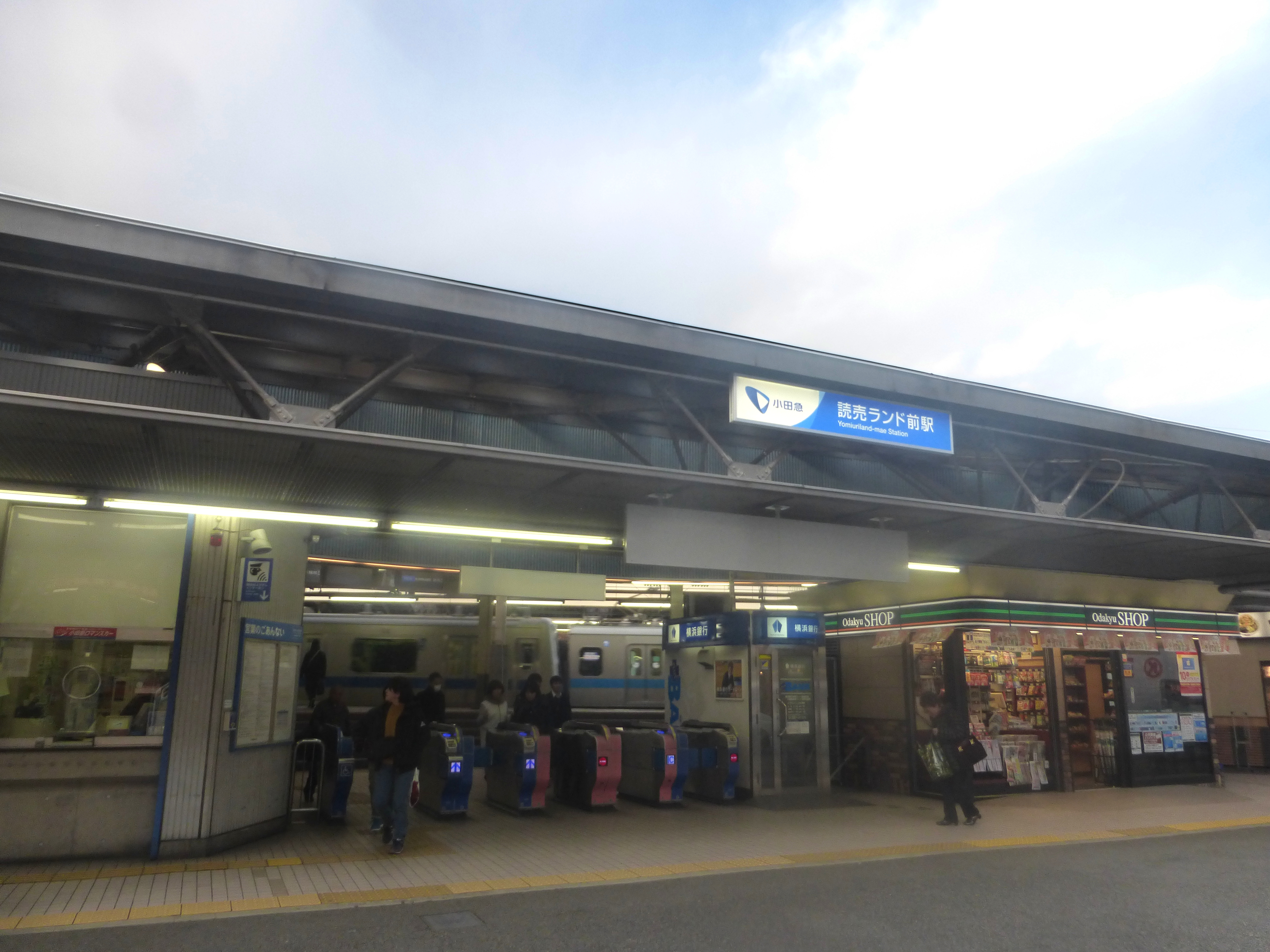
- South Exit of Yomiuriland-mae Station, 2018

General information
- Location: 3-8-1 Nishiikuta, Tama-ku, Kawasaki-shi, Kanagawa-ken; Japan
- Coordinates: 35.6147°N 139.5280°E
- Operator: Odakyu Electric Railway
- Line: Odakyu Odawara Line
- Distance: 19.2 km from Shinjuku
- Platforms: 2 side platforms
- Connections: Bus stop

Other information
- Station code: OH21
- Website: Official website

History
- Opened: 1 April 1927; 99 years ago
- Former names: Nishi-Ikuta (until 1964)

Passengers
- FY2019: 36,082

Services
Preceding station	Odakyu	Following station
Yurigaoka One-way operation	Odawara Line Commuter Semi Express	Ikuta towards Yoyogi-Uehara
Yurigaoka towards Hon-Atsugi	Odawara Line Semi Express	Ikuta towards Yoyogi-Uehara
Yurigaoka towards Odawara	Odawara Line Local	Ikuta towards Shinjuku or Yoyogi-Uehara
Location
- Location within Kanagawa Prefecture Location within Japan

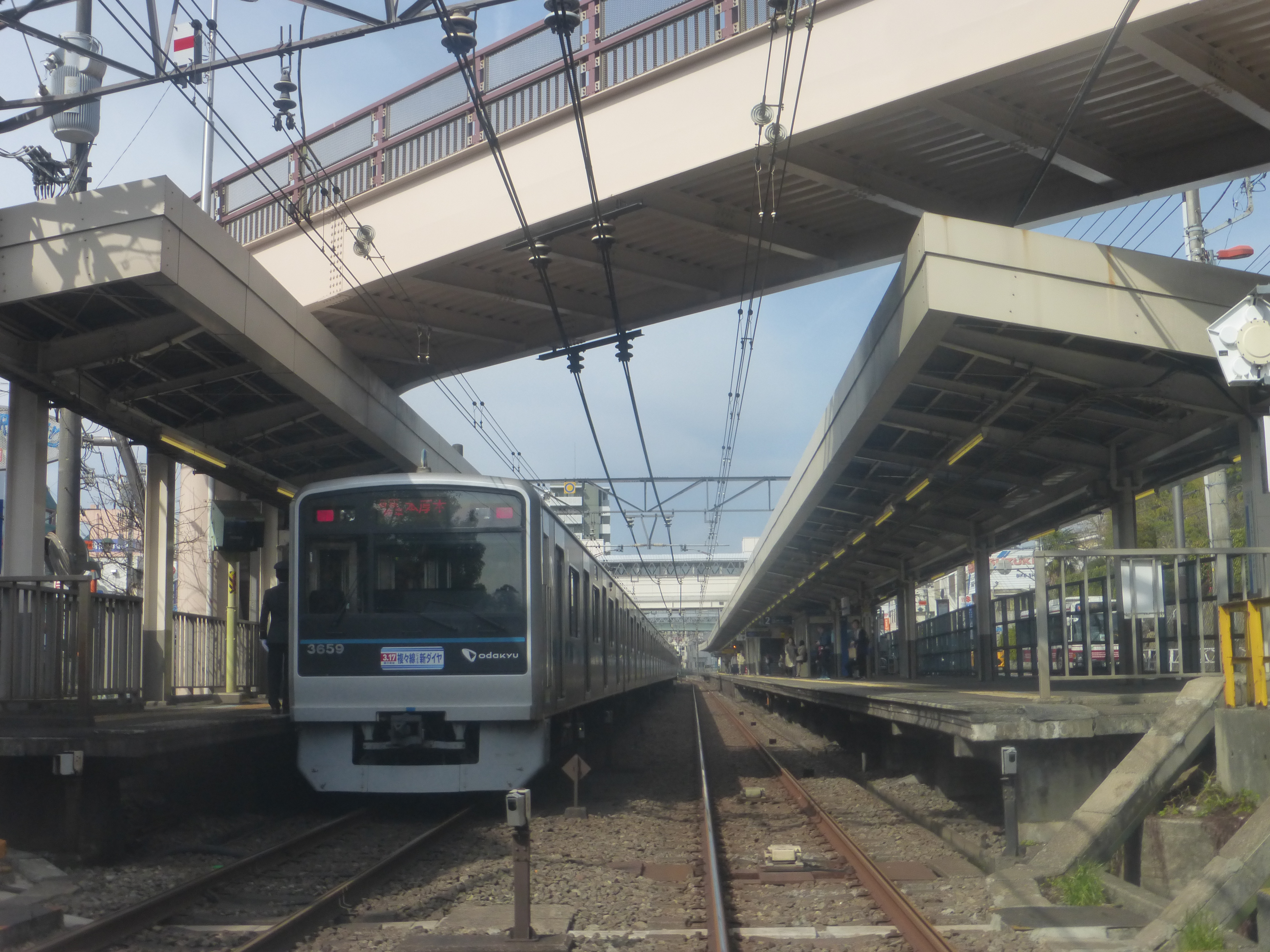
Station platforms, 2018

Yomiuriland-mae Station (読売ランド前駅, Yomiuri Rando Mae eki) is a passenger railway station located in the Nishi-Ikuta neighborhood of Tama-ku, Kawasaki, Kanagawa, Japan and operated by the private railway operator Odakyu Electric Railway.

== Lines ==
Yomiuriland-mae Station is served by the Odakyu Odawara Line, with some through services to and from Shinjuku in Tokyo. It lies 19.2 km (11.9 mi) from the Shinjuku terminus.

== Station layout ==
The station consists of two opposed side platforms serving two tracks.

=== Platforms ===
1	■ Odakyu Odawara Line	For Sagami-Ono, Hon-Atsugi, and Odawara
2	■ Odakyu Odawara Line	For Kyodo, Shimo-Kitazawa, Yoyogi-Uehara, Chiyoda line Ayase and Shinjuku

== History ==
Yomiuriland-mae Station opened as Nishi-Ikuta Station (西生田駅, Nishi-Ikuta eki) on 1 April 1927. It became a local stop in 1945, and was promoted to a “Semi-Express” stop in 1946, a “Sakura Semi-Express” stop in 1948, and “Commuter Special Express” stop in 1960. It was renamed to its present name in 1964. A new station concourse was completed in 1995.

Station numbering was introduced in January 2014 with Yomiuriland-mae being assigned station number OH21.

== Passenger statistics ==
In fiscal 2019, the station was used by an average of 36,082 passengers daily.

The passenger figures for previous years are as shown below.

Fiscal year	daily average
2005	32,555
2010	33,960
2015	35,131

== Surrounding area ==
Yomiuriland, home to one of the Yomiuri Giants baseball team's training grounds, as well as a large amusement park is nearby the station. Japan Women's University's Nishi-Ikuta Campus is also located here.

== See also ==
- List of railway stations in Japan
