= Ikuta Station =

Railway station in Kawasaki, Kanagawa Prefecture, Japan

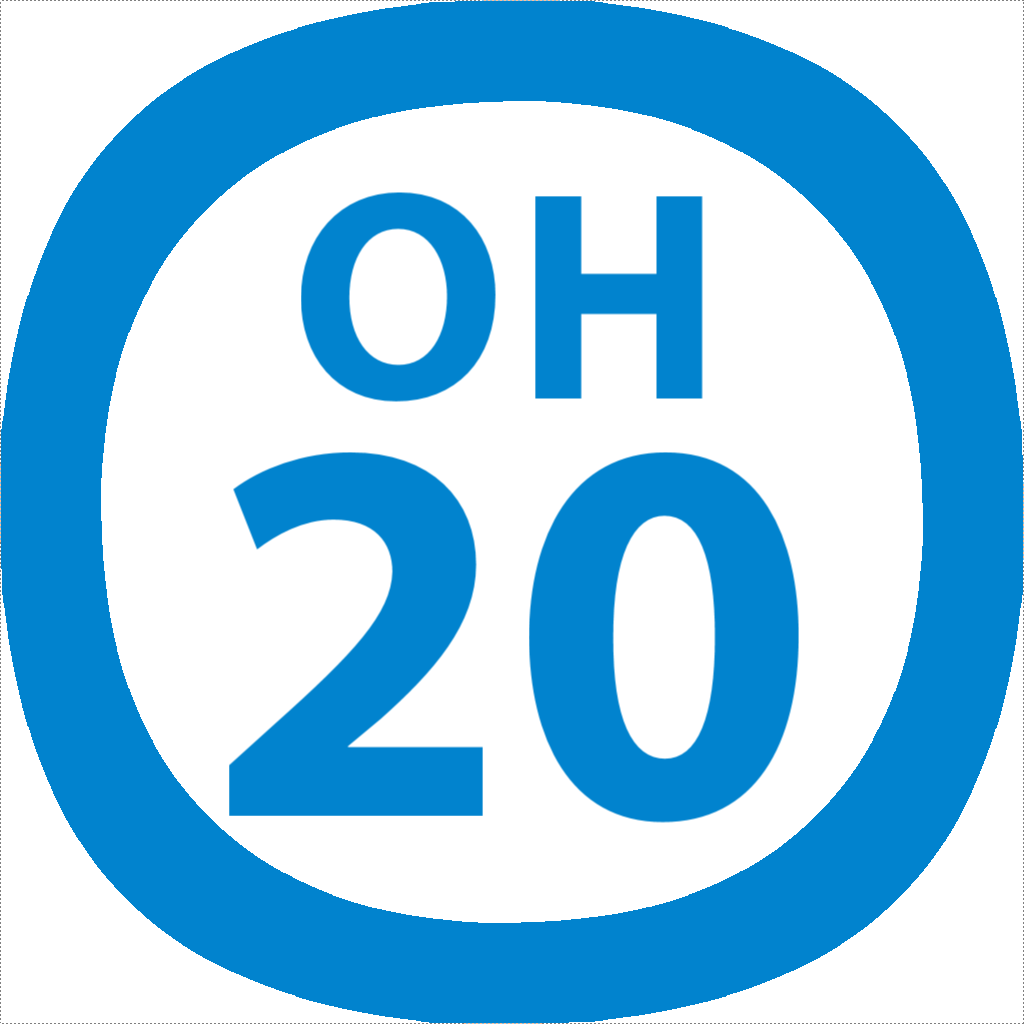
Ikuta Station 生田駅

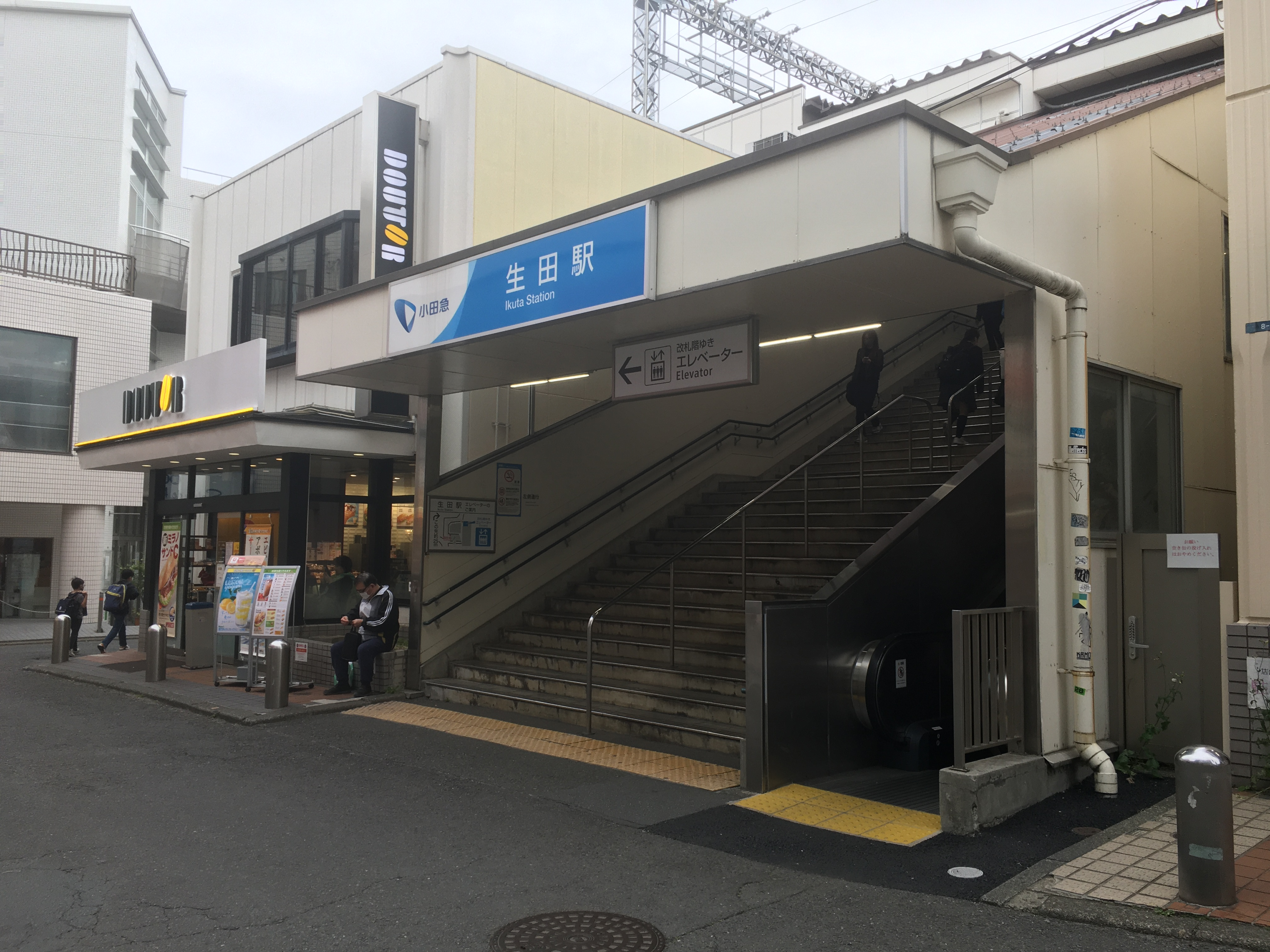
- North Exit of Ikuta Station, 2021

General information
- Location: 7-8 Ikuta, Tama-ku, Kawasaki-shi, Kanagawa-ken; Japan
- Coordinates: 35°36′54″N 139°32′32″E
- Operator: Odakyu Electric Railway
- Line: Odakyu Odawara Line
- Distance: 17.9 km from Shinjuku
- Platforms: 2 side platforms
- Connections: Bus stop

Other information
- Station code: OH20
- Website: Official website

History
- Opened: 1 April 1927; 99 years ago
- Former names: Higashi-Ikuta (until 1964)

Passengers
- FY2019: 46,037

Services
Preceding station	Odakyu	Following station
Yomiuriland-mae One-way operation	Odawara Line Commuter Semi Express	Mukōgaoka-Yūen towards Yoyogi-Uehara
Yomiuriland-mae towards Hon-Atsugi	Odawara Line Semi Express	Mukōgaoka-Yūen towards Yoyogi-Uehara
Yomiuriland-mae towards Odawara	Odawara Line Local	Mukōgaoka-Yūen towards Shinjuku or Yoyogi-Uehara
Location
- Location within Kanagawa Prefecture Location within Japan

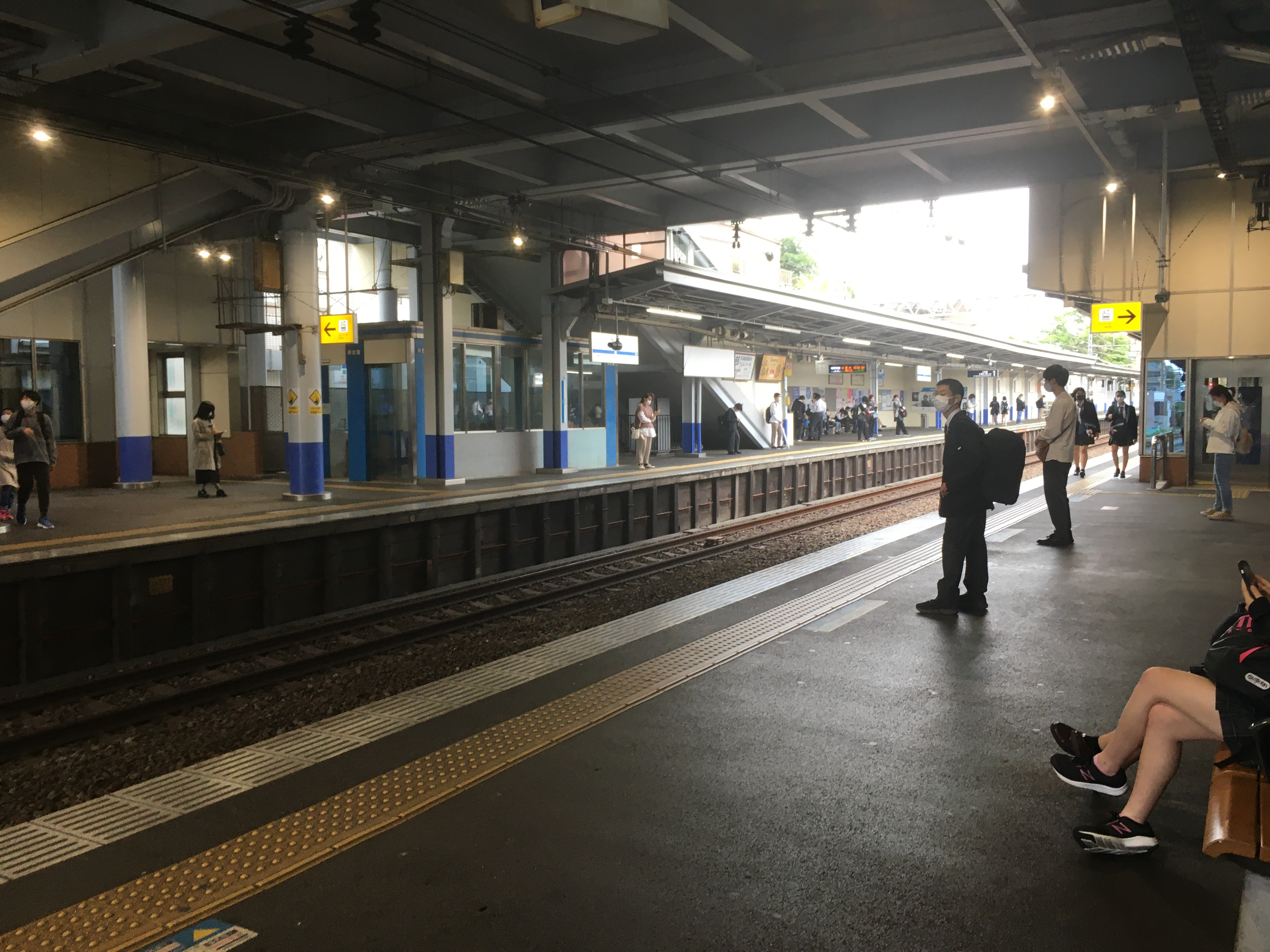
Platforms

Ikuta Station (生田駅, Ikuta-eki) is a passenger railway station located in the Ikuta neighborhood of Tama-ku, Kawasaki, Kanagawa, Japan and operated by the private railway operator Odakyu Electric Railway.

== Lines ==
Ikuta Station is served by the Odakyu Odawara Line, with some through services to and from Shinjuku in Tokyo. It lies 17.9 km (11.1 mi) from the Shinjuku terminus.

== Station layout ==
The station consists of two opposed elevated side platforms serving two tracks, which are connected to the station building by a footbridge.

=== Platforms ===
1	■ Odakyu Odawara Line	or Sagami-Ōno, Hon-Atsugi, and Odawara
2	■ Odakyu Odawara Line	For Kyōdō, Shimo-Kitazawa, Yoyogi-Uehara), Chiyoda line Ayase and Shinjuku

== History ==
Ikuta Station opened on April 1, 1927 as Higashi-Ikuta Station (東生田駅, Higashi Ikuta eki). It was promoted from a local train stop in 1945, to a “Semi-Express” stop in 1946, a “Sakura Semi-Express” stop in 1948, and a “Rush Hour Semi-Express” stop in 1964. It became a “Section Semi-Express” stop in 2004.

Station numbering was introduced in January 2014 with Ikuta being assigned station number OH20.

== Passenger statistics ==
In fiscal 2019, the station was used by an average of 46,037 passengers daily.

The passenger figures for previous years are as shown below.

Fiscal year	daily average
2005	41,314
2010	43,925
2015	5,279

== Surrounding area ==
Universities such as Meiji University, Senshu University, and St. Marianna University School of Medicine are scattered in the vicinity, and it is becoming a student district.

== See also ==
- List of railway stations in Japan
