= Gaku Tsutaja =

Japanese contemporary artist

- Born: 1974 (age 51–52); Tokyo, Japan
- Education: Tokyo Zokei University, SUNY Purchase College
- Known for: Multimedia art
- Website: http://www.gakutsutaja.net

Gaku Tsutaja (born 1974) is a Japanese contemporary artist based in Queens, New York. Her multimedia practice combines drawing, installation, performance, and animation to examine themes of historical trauma, nuclear history, and cultural memory.

== Early life and education ==
Tsutaja was born in Tokyo, Japan in 1974. She studied at Tokyo Zokei University before moving to the United States to complete her MFA at SUNY Purchase College.

== Career ==
Tsutaja’s work engages with stories from World War II and the Cold War, often using allegory and animation to reflect on the social and emotional impact of nuclear warfare. Her practice is influenced by historical events such as the 1995 Great Hanshin earthquake, the Tokyo subway sarin attack, and the Fukushima nuclear accident. Tsutaja’s works often employ fictional characters and narrative strategies drawn from folklore and comics to examine how history is remembered or forgotten.

Her art has been exhibited in solo and group shows in New York and internationally.

=== Selected exhibitions ===
Her solo exhibitions include:

- A Trip to the Moon (2019) at Shirley Fiterman Art Center, Borough of Manhattan Community College.
- Spider’s Thread (2020) at Ulterior Gallery.
- ENOLA’S HEAD (2021), a commission for the Rubin Center for the Visual Arts, University of Texas at El Paso.
- Warp Drive (2022) at Maruki Gallery for the Hiroshima Panels in Saitama, Japan.
- Memory Bug (2023) at Ulterior Gallery.

Her group exhibitions include:

- Yokohama Triennale (2005) as part of the artist collective Gansomaeda.
- Hawai‘i Triennial (2022) at the Bishop Museum, Honolulu.
- Between Memories and Objects: Monuments, Museums, and Archives (記憶と物のあいだ―記念碑、ミュージアム、アーカイブ), Hiroshima City Museum of Contemporary Art, Japan (2025).
- Artists Against the Bomb (2025), Judd Foundation, New York, USA.
- 29th Taro Okamoto Contemporary Art Award (第29回岡本太郎現代芸術賞), Taro Okamoto Museum of Art, Kawasaki, Japan (2026).

== Critical reception ==
Tsutaja’s work has been reviewed in The New York Times, Artforum, and Hyperallergic, with critics noting her use of fantastical imagery to approach complex histories.
