= Taro Okamoto Museum of Art =

Art museum in Japan

- 川崎市岡本太郎美術館
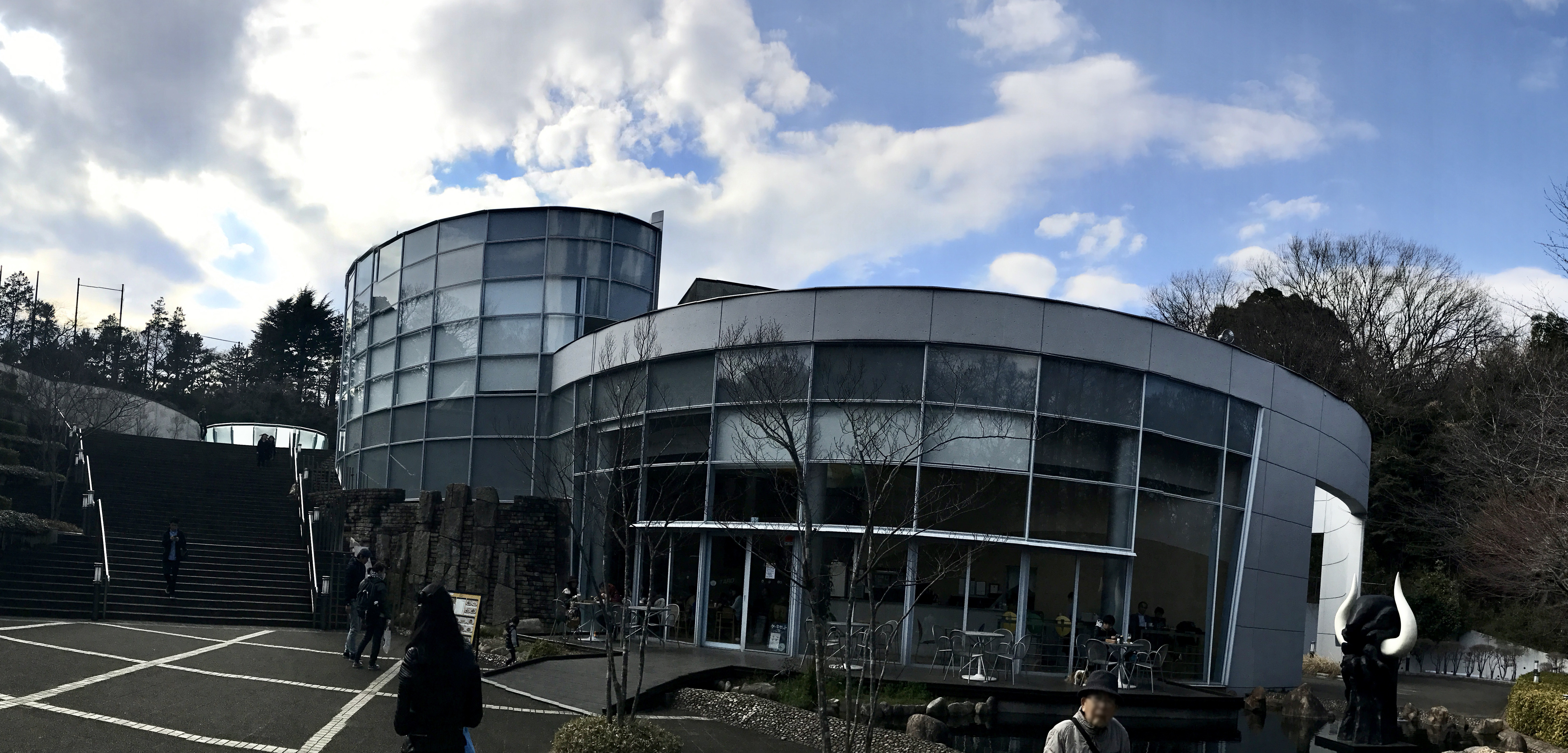
- Exterior of the museum, 2017
- Location: Ikuta Ryokuchi Park, Tama-ku, Kawasaki, Kanagawa, Japan
- Type: Art museum
- Collections: approx. 1,779 works
- Collection size: Works by Tarō Okamoto, Kanoko Okamoto, Ippei Okamoto
- Visitors: 81,944 (FY2019)
- Owner: City of Kawasaki
- Public transit access: Mukōgaoka-Yūen Station (Odakyū Odawara Line)
- Website: www.taromuseum.jp

Taro Okamoto Museum of Art (岡本太郎美術館, Okamoto Tarō Bijutsukan) is an art museum located in Tama-ku, Kawasaki, Kanagawa, Japan. Located within Ikuta Ryokuchi Park in Tama Ward, the museum opened in 1999.

The Taro Okamoto Museum of Art is dedicated to the life and work of Japanese artist Tarō Okamoto (1911–1996) and houses a collection of his paintings, sculptures, designs, and related materials. It also preserves works by his parents, the novelist Kanoko Okamoto and the cartoonist Ippei Okamoto.

== History ==
In November 1991, Okamoto donated 352 works to Kawasaki City, initiating plans for a dedicated museum. A planning committee was established in 1992, and after several proposals and public consultations the site was fixed within Ikuta Ryokuchi Park, on the grounds of a former golf practice area. Construction began in 1996, and the museum was completed in February 1999 before opening to the public later that year.

Work began on the museum's construction in 1996 and the museum was iopened in October 1999. The museum continues to be operated by Kawasaki City.

== Building and Facilities ==
The museum building has a total floor area of about 4,993 square metres. Its design emphasizes underground exhibition spaces integrated into the surrounding park. The grounds include the 30-metre outdoor tower sculpture Tower of Mother (Haha no tō), first conceived by Okamoto in 1971. Facilities also include permanent and temporary exhibition galleries, a museum shop, and a café.

=== Collection and Exhibitions ===
The museum holds approximately 1,779 works, including Okamoto's paintings, sculptures, and large-scale installations. The permanent exhibition introduces different phases of his career with multimedia displays. The museum also organizes temporary exhibitions featuring contemporary art and emerging artists in addition to Okamoto's oeuvre.

== Access ==
- The museum is located approximately 17 minutes walk from Mukōgaoka-Yūen Station on the Odakyu Line.
