= Mukōgaoka-Yūen Monorail =

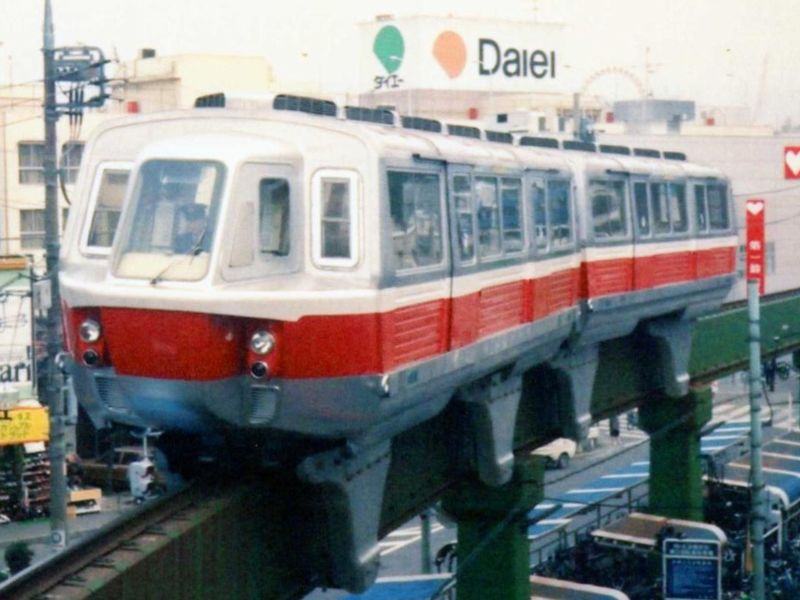
- The monorail in 1990

Overview
- Native name: 向ヶ丘遊園モノレール線
- Status: abandoned
- Locale: Kawasaki, Kanagawa
- Termini: Mukōgaoka-Yūen Station; Mukōgaoka-Yūen Seimon Station
- Stations: 2

Service
- Type: monorail
- Operator(s): Odakyu Electric Railway

History
- Opened: April 23, 1966
- Closed: February 1, 2001

Technical
- Line length: 1.1 km (0.68 mi)
- Electrification: 600 V

The Mukōgaoka-Yūen Monorail (向ヶ丘遊園モノレール) was a privately owned monorail system connecting Mukōgaoka-Yūen Station to the main gate of the Mukōgaoka Yūen amusement park.

== History ==
Odakyu opened both the Odakyū Odawara Line electric railway from Tokyo to Odawara and the Mukōgaoka Yūen amusement park in 1927. Initially, the park was connected to the nearest station by a miniature railway, but plans to build a major road across the line led Odakyu to replace it with a monorail.

Built for ¥200 million ($550,000 in 1966 dollars), the short 1.1-km line was the first monorail built by the Nihon-Lockheed Monorail Company, a joint venture of aerospace company Lockheed with Kawasaki Aerospace Company. A trip lasted only three minutes, with the line's single two-car train running every 15 minutes during park opening hours. At ¥100/160 one-way/return, the fare was cheaper than the regular city bus (¥200), and was thus used by some local residents as well.

By the end of the 1990s, the line was serving only on average 900 passengers a day. Cracks were discovered in the vehicle in February 2000, leading Odakyu to suspend operations and eventually decide that the estimated ¥380 million replacement cost could not be justified. The amusement park closed shortly afterwards in 2002.
