= Tama-ku =

Tama 多摩区
- Ward
- Tama Ward
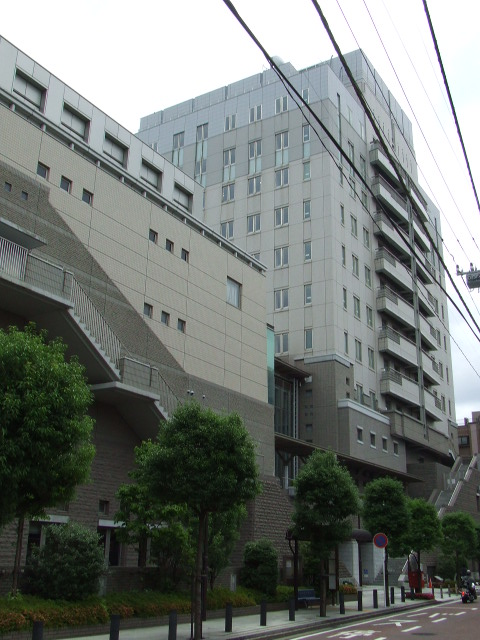
- Tama Ward Office

- Seal

- Location of Tama in Kanagawa Prefecture

- Coordinates: 35°37′11″N 139°33′43″E
- Country: Japan
- Region: Kantō
- Prefecture: Kanagawa
- City: Kawasaki
- Established: April 1, 1972

Area
  - Total: 20.49 km^{2} (7.91 sq mi)

Population (March 2010)
  - Total: 211,221
  - Density: 10,310/km^{2} (26,700/sq mi)
- Time zone: UTC+9 (Japan Standard Time)
- Tree: Flowering Dogwood, Nashi Pear
- Flower: Viola, Peach
- Address: 1775-1 Noborito, Tama-ku Kawasaki-shi, Kanagawa-ken; 214-8570
- Website: www.city.kawasaki.jp/71/71tama/home/index.html

Tama-ku (多摩区) is one of the seven wards of the city of Kawasaki in Kanagawa Prefecture, Japan. As of 2010, the ward has an estimated population of 211,221 and a population density of 10,310 persons per km^{2}. The total area is 20.49 km^{2}.

== Geography ==
Tama Ward is located in eastern Kanagawa Prefecture, in the far northwestern corner of the city of Kawasaki, bordering on Tokyo. It is bordered to the north by the Tama River.

=== Surrounding municipalities ===
- Takatsu-ku, Kawasaki
- Miyamae-ku, Kawasaki
- Asao-ku, Kawasaki
- Setagaya-ku, Tokyo
- Chōfu, Tokyo
- Komae, Tokyo
- Inagi, Tokyo

== History ==
The area around present-day Tama Ward has been inhabited for thousands of years. Archaeologists have found kofun along the banks of the Tama River and at other locations in the Ward. Under the Nara period Ritsuryō system, it was divided between Tachibana District, Tama District and Tsutsuki District in Musashi Province. By the Heian period it was part of a shōen controlled by the Inage clan. By the Kamakura period, it was controlled by their descendants, the Ozawa clan, and in the Muromachi period by the Terao clan. During the Sengoku period, the area was a contested territory between the Uesugi clan and the Later Hōjō clan from Odawara, who emerged in control by 1530. The area was devastated by flooding when the Tama River shifted course to the north in 1590. After the defeat of the Hōjō at the Battle of Odawara, the territory came under the control of Tokugawa Ieyasu. It was administered as tenryō territory controlled directly by the Tokugawa shogunate, but administered through various hatamoto. From 1725, the 52 villages of the area were a designated zone for Falconry by the Tokugawa shōguns, but suffered from repeated natural disasters: an earthquake in 1782, floods in 1786, famine in 1787, floods in 1790, 1791 and 1809 and earthquake in 1855.

After the Meiji Restoration, the area was transferred to the new Kanagawa Prefecture, and divided into several villages within Tachibana District and Tsuzuki District, Kanagawa on April 1, 1889. These areas were annexed by the neighboring city of Kawasaki from 1938 to 1939. The area became Tama Ward with the division of the city of Kawasaki into wards from April 1972. In July 1982, Asao Ward was separated from Tama Ward. A new Ward Office was completed in 1997.

== Economy ==
Tama Ward is largely a regional commercial center and bedroom community for central Kawasaki and Tokyo. Several factories producing chemical, glass, and electronics are located in the ward, and there is some residual agriculture (primarily horticulture and market vegetables).

== Transportation ==
=== Rail ===
- JR East - Nambu Line
  - Shukugawara - Noborito - Nakanoshima - Inadazutsumi
- Keiō Corporation – Keiō Sagamihara Line
  - Keiō-Inadazutsumi Station
- Odakyu Electric Railway – Odakyū Odawara Line
  - Noborito - Mukōgaoka-Yūen - Ikuta - Yomiuriland-mae

=== Highways ===
==== Prefecture roads ====
- Kanagawa Prefectural Road 3
- Kanagawa Prefectural Road 9
- Kanagawa Prefectural Road 13
- Kanagawa Prefectural Road 124

== Local attractions ==
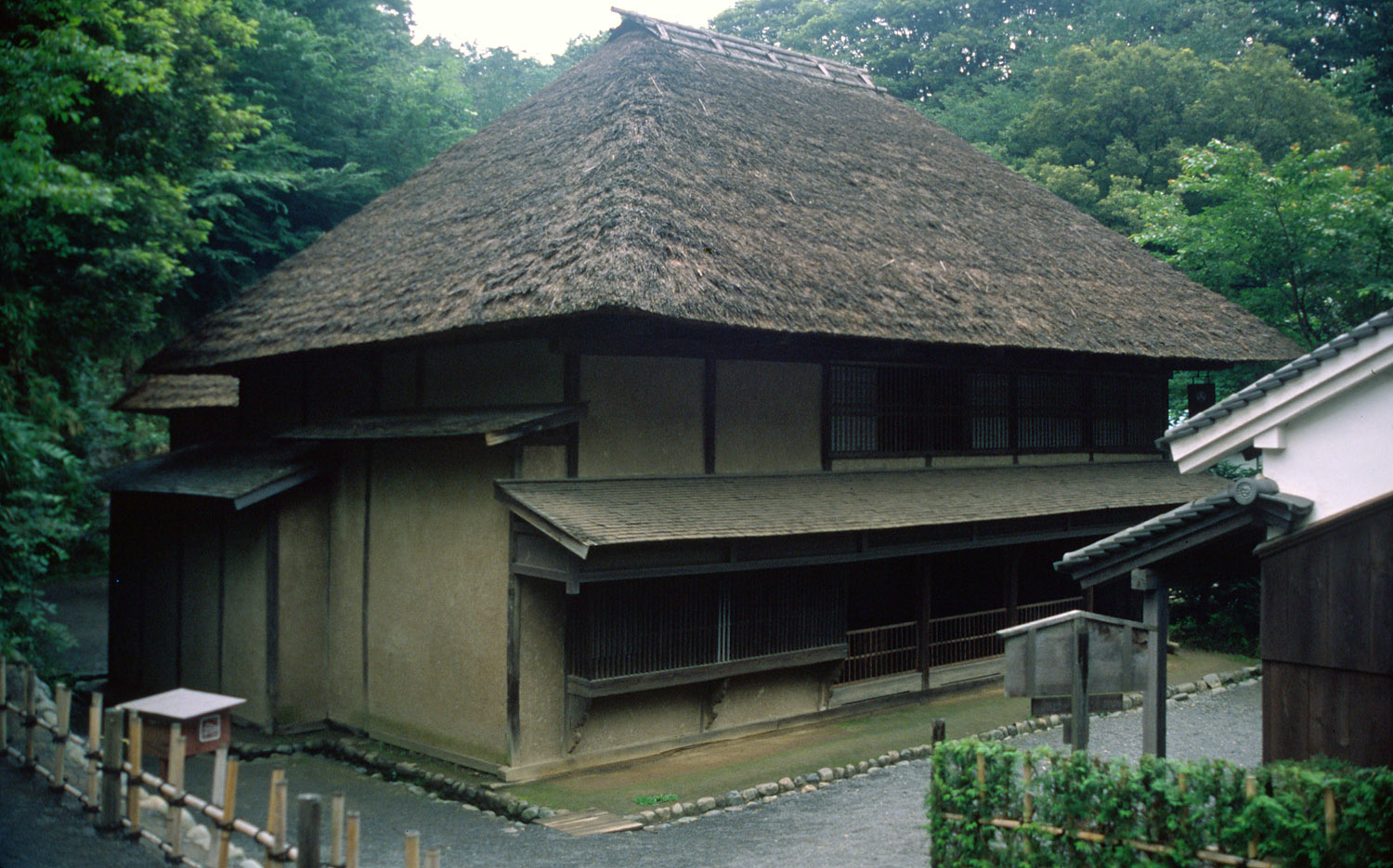
Kawasaki Japan Folk Garden in Ikuta park

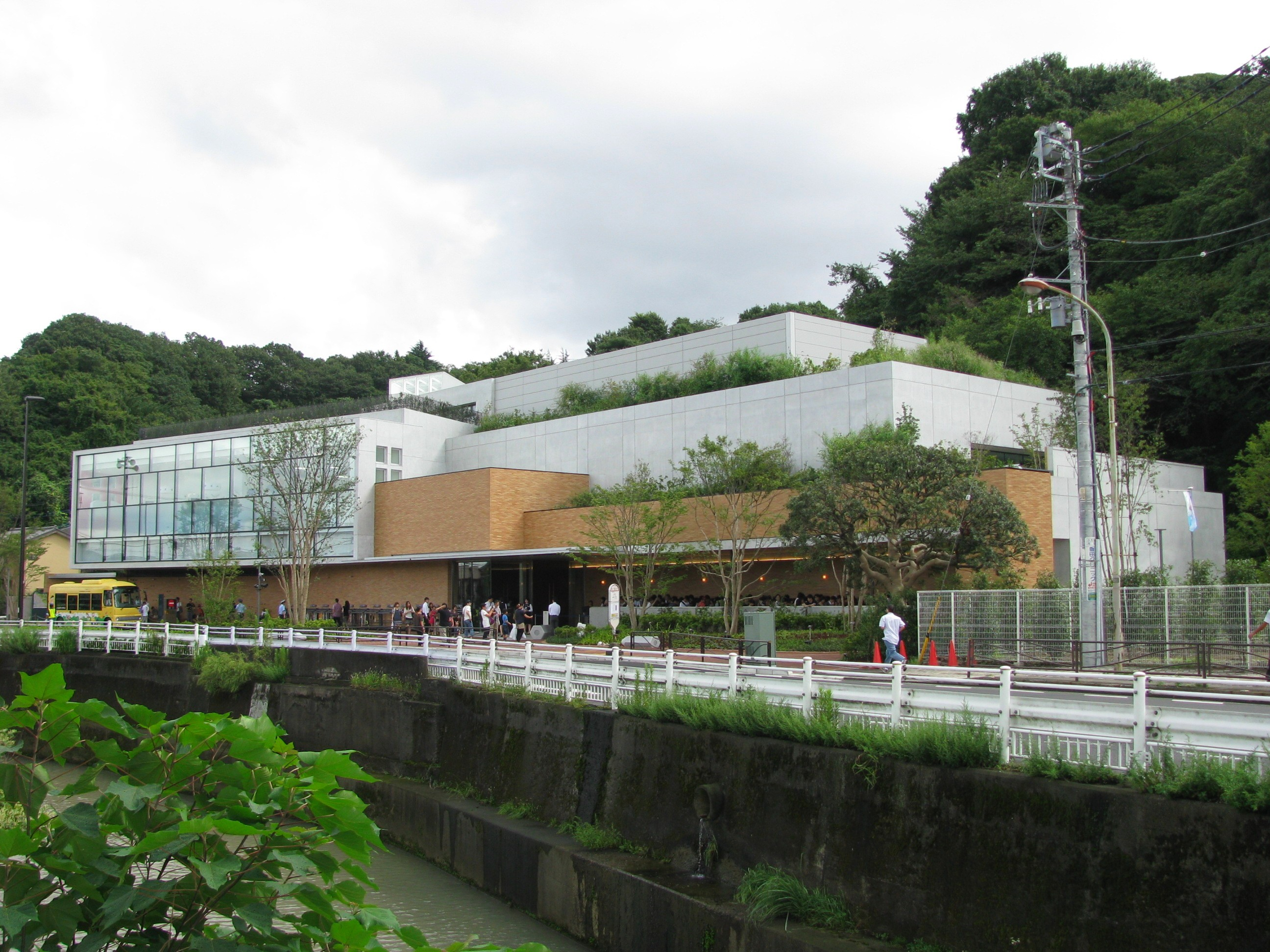
Fujiko F. Fujio Museum

- Nihon Minka-en Museum
- Taro Okamoto Museum of Art
- Yomiuriland
- Fujiko F. Fujio Museum

== Education ==
Tertiary:

- Senshu University – Ikuta campus
- Meiji University – Ikuta campus
- Japan Women's University – Nishiikuta campus

Municipal junior high schools:

- Ikuta (生田中学校)
- Inada (稲田中学校)
- Masugata (枡形中学校)
- Minamiikuta (南生田中学校)
- Minamisuge (南菅中学校)
- Nakanoshima (中野島中学校)
- Suge (菅中学校)

Municipal elementary schools:

- Higashi Ikuta (東生田小学校)
- Higashi Suge (東菅小学校)
- Ikuta (生田小学校)
- Inada (稲田小学校)
- Minami Ikuta (南生田小学校)
- Minami Suge (南菅小学校)
- Mita (三田小学校)
- Nagao (長尾小学校)
- Nakanoshima (中野島小学校)
- Nishi Suge (西菅小学校)
- Noborito (登戸小学校)
- Shimofuda (下布田小学校)
- Shukugawara (宿河原小学校)
- Suge (菅小学校)

Private primary and secondary

- Caritas Girls' Junior and Senior High School (private)

== Notable people from Tama Ward ==
- Koji Miyoshi, Football player
- Shigefumi Matsuzawa, politician
- Hikaru Nishida, actress
- Yūji Oda, actor
- Takayuki Ohira, engineer, inventor
