= Nihon Minka-en =

Park in Kanagawa Prefecture, Japan

Coordinates: 35°36′36″N 139°33′43″E

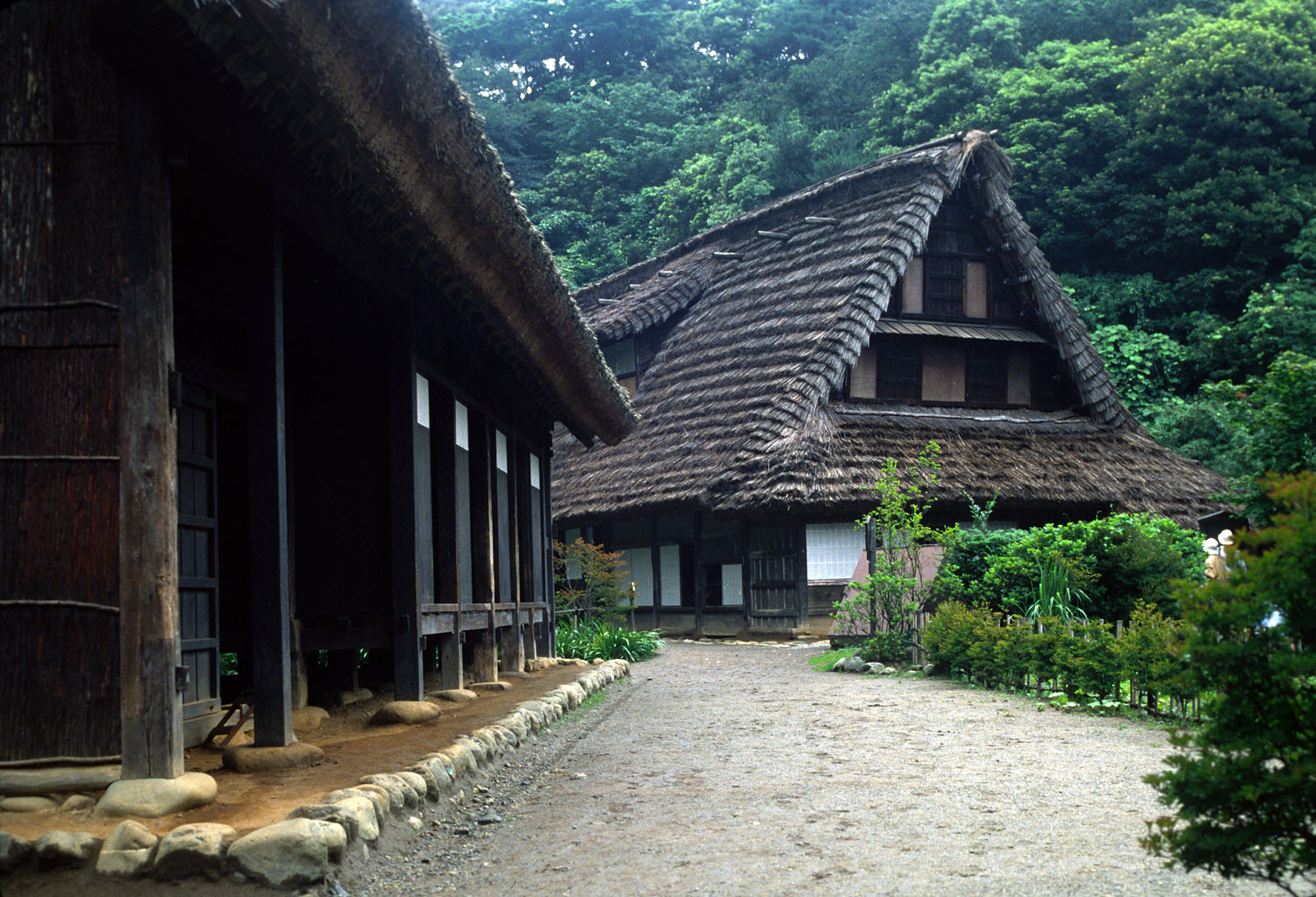
Traditional houses at Nihon Minka-en

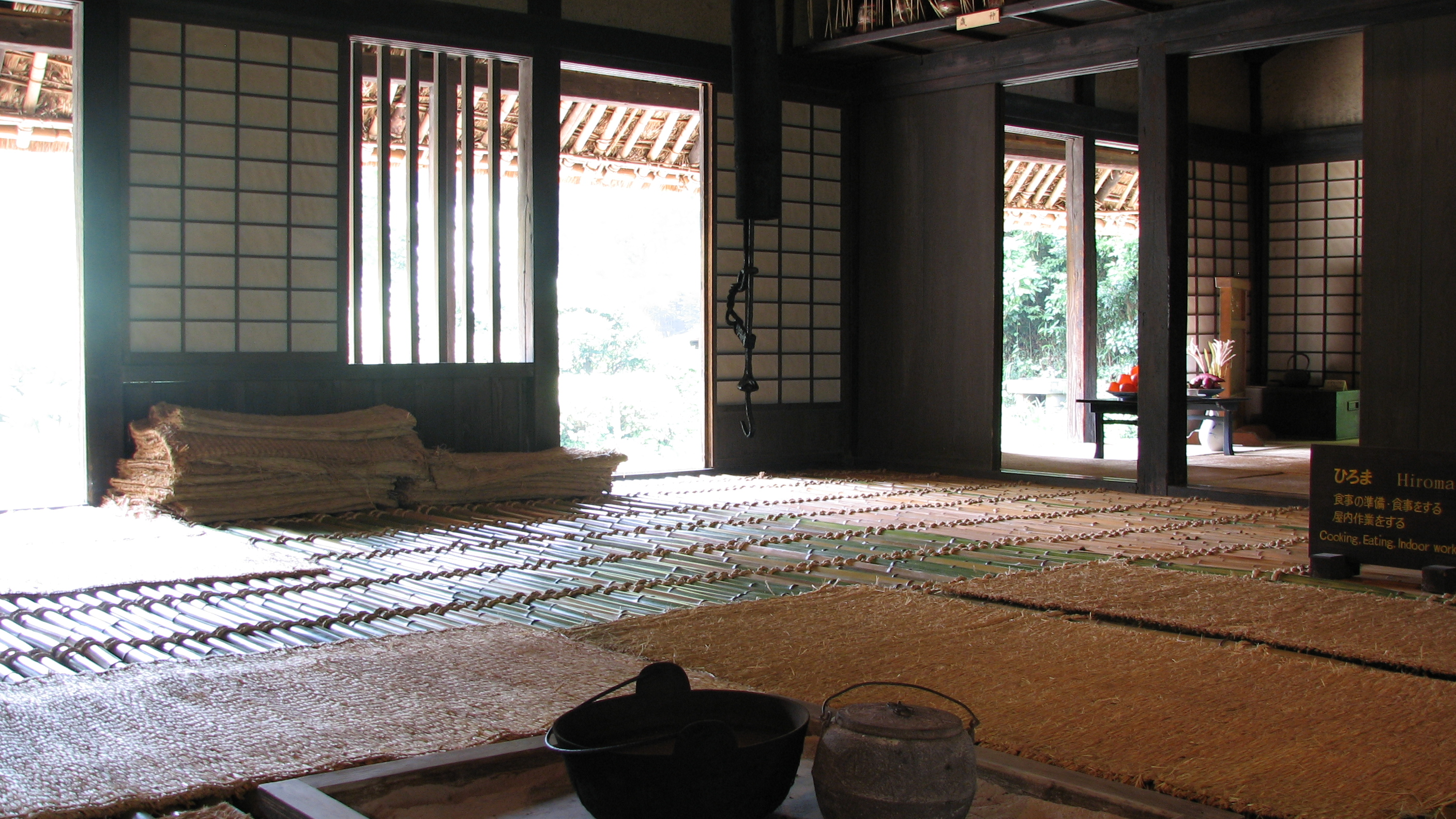
Interior of the Kitamura house at Nihon Minka-en

Nihon Minka-en (日本民家園) is a park in the Ikuta Ryokuchi Park (生田緑地) of Tama-ku, Kawasaki, Kanagawa Prefecture, Japan. On display in the park is a collection of 20 traditional minka (民家) (farm houses) from various areas of Japan, especially thatched-roofed houses from eastern Japan. Of these, nine have received the designation of Important Cultural Assets from the national government. The houses are varied in design, and include examples from regions of heavy snow, lodgings for travellers, and a theatrical stage. Visitors can see regional variety and differences in construction.

The park is operated by the city of Kawasaki. Admission is free to visitors who are not older than junior-high-school age. The entrance is a fifteen-minute walk from Mukogaoka-Yuen Station on the Odakyu Odawara Line.

== See also ==
- Historic Villages of Shirakawa-gō and Gokayama
