= Mukōgaoka-Yūen Station =

Railway station in Kawasaki, Kanagawa Prefecture, Japan

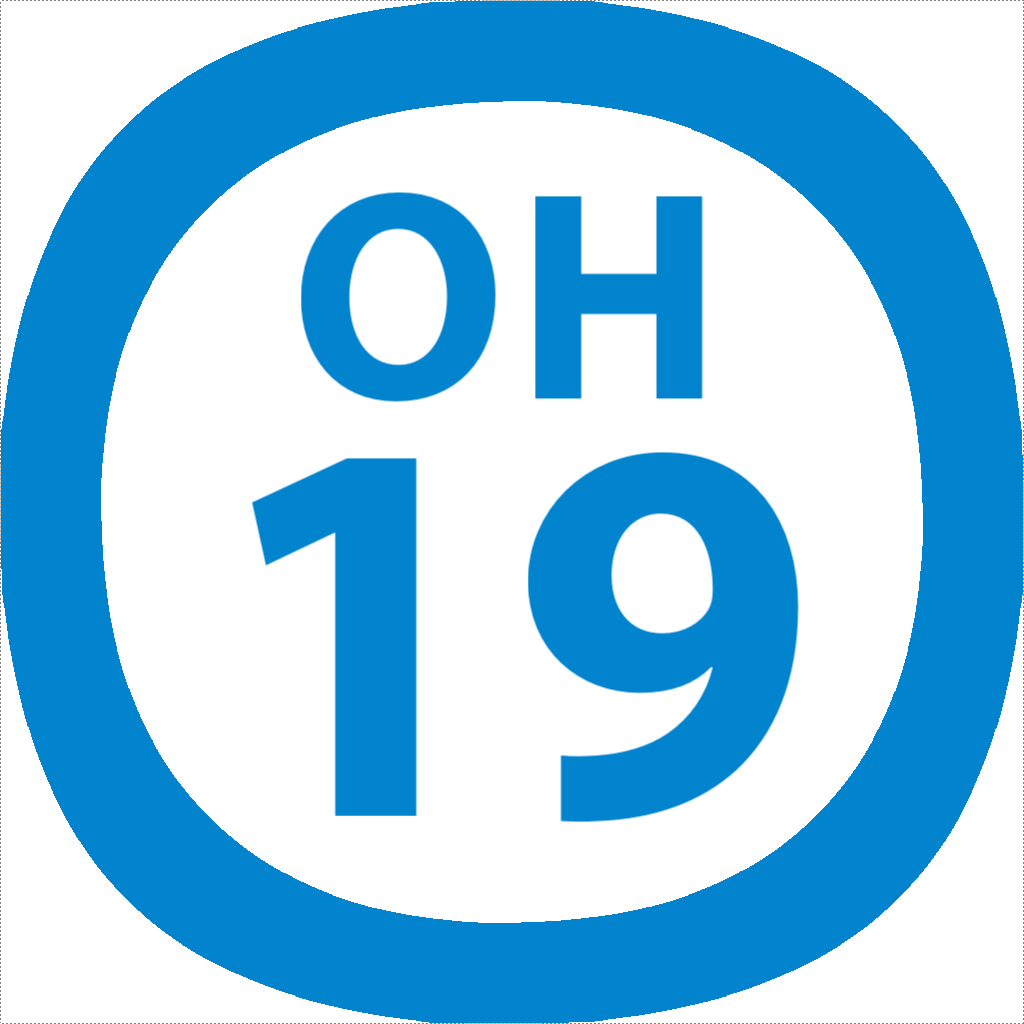
Mukōgaoka-Yūen Station 向ヶ丘遊園駅

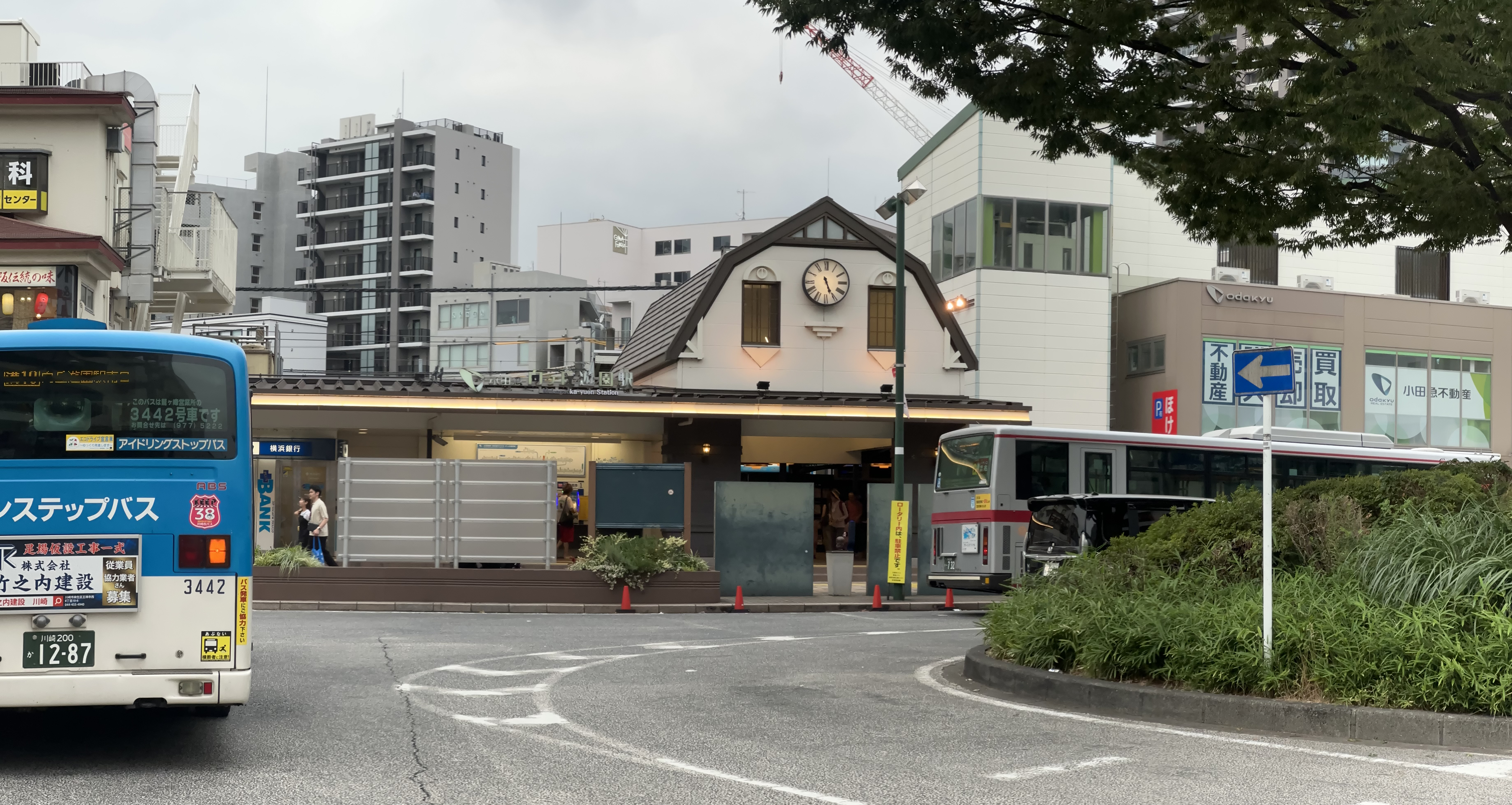
- Mukōgaoka-Yūen Station south exit, August 2026

General information
- Location: Noborito, Tama-ku, Kawasaki-shi, Kanagawa-ken; Japan
- Coordinates: 35°37′02″N 139°33′52″E
- Operator: Odakyu Electric Railway
- Line: Odakyu Odawara Line
- Distance: 15.8 km from Shinjuku
- Platforms: 2 island platforms
- Connections: Bus stop

Other information
- Station code: OH19
- Website: Official website

History
- Opened: 1 April 1927; 99 years ago

Passengers
- FY2019: 67,384

Services
Preceding station	Odakyu	Following station
Shin-Yurigaoka One-way operation	Odawara Line Commuter Express	Seijogakuen-mae towards Shinjuku
Shin-Yurigaoka towards Odawara	Odawara Line Express	Noborito towards Shinjuku or Yoyogi-Uehara
Ikuta One-way operation	Odawara Line Commuter Semi Express	Noborito towards Yoyogi-Uehara
Ikuta towards Hon-Atsugi	Odawara Line Semi Express	Noborito towards Yoyogi-Uehara
Ikuta towards Odawara	Odawara Line Local	Noborito towards Shinjuku or Yoyogi-Uehara
Location
- Location within Kanagawa Prefecture Location within Japan

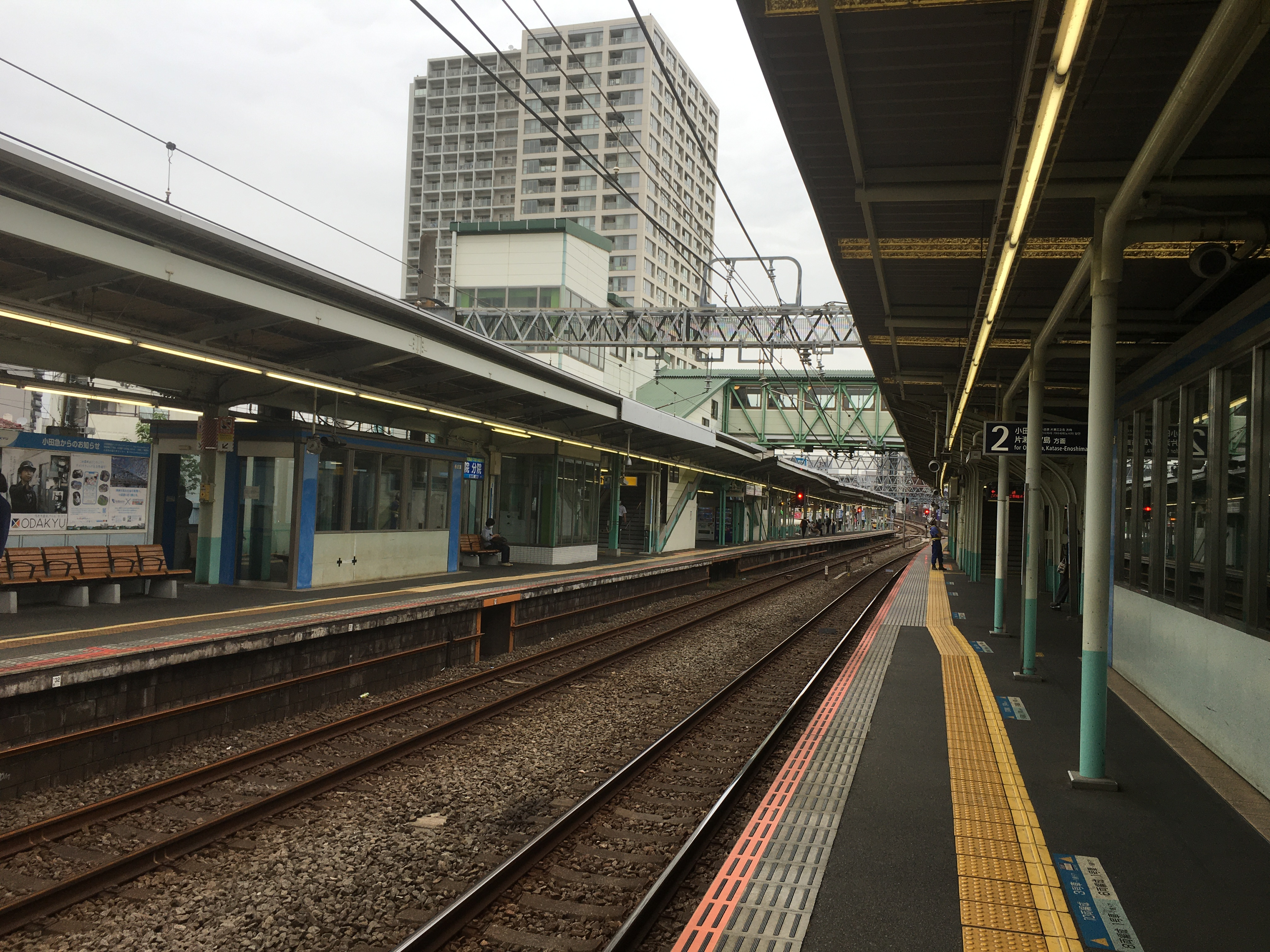
Platforms, 2021

Mukōgaoka-Yūen Station (向ヶ丘遊園駅, Mukōgaoka-Yūen-eki) is a passenger railway station located in the Noborito neighborhood of Tama-ku, Kawasaki, Kanagawa, Japan, and operated by the private railway operator Odakyu Electric Railway.

== Lines ==
Mukōgaoka-Yūen Station is served by the Odakyu Odawara Line, with some through services to and from Shinjuku in Tokyo. It lies 15.8 km (9.8 mi) from the Shinjuku terminus.

== Station layout ==
The station consists of two island platforms serving four tracks, which are connected to the station building by a footbridge.

=== Platforms ===
1	Odakyu Odawara Line	for Odawara, Karakida, and Katase-Enoshima
2	Odakyu Odawara Line	for Odawara, Karakida, and Katase-Enoshima
3	Odakyu Odawara Line	for Shinjuku; Tokyo Metro Chiyoda Line for Ayase; Joban Line for Abiko and Toride
4	Odakyu Odawara Line	for Shinjuku

== History ==
Mukōgaoka-Yūen Station was opened on 1 April 1927 as Inada-Noborito Station (稲田登戸駅). During the same year, a small steam train begins operating between this station and Mukogaoka-Yuen Amusement Park. The station was renamed to its present name in 1955. The steam locomotive service ceased in 1965, and then following year, the Mukōgaoka-Yūen Monorail began operations. This was discontinued in 2001, and the Mukōgaoka-Yūen Amusement Park ceased operations in 2002.

Station numbering was introduced in January 2014 with Mukōgaoka-Yūen being assigned station number OH19.

== Passenger statistics ==
In fiscal 2019, the station was used by an average of 67,384 passengers daily.

The passenger figures for previous years are as shown below.

Fiscal year	daily average
2005	60,741
2010	64,199
2015	65,774

== Surrounding area ==
- Fujiko F Fujio Museum
- Nihon Minka-en
- Senshu University
- Taro Okamoto Museum of Art
- Tama Ward Office

== See also ==
- List of railway stations in Japan
