= Odakyu Electric Railway =

Japanese private railway operator

Odakyu Electric Railway Co., Ltd.

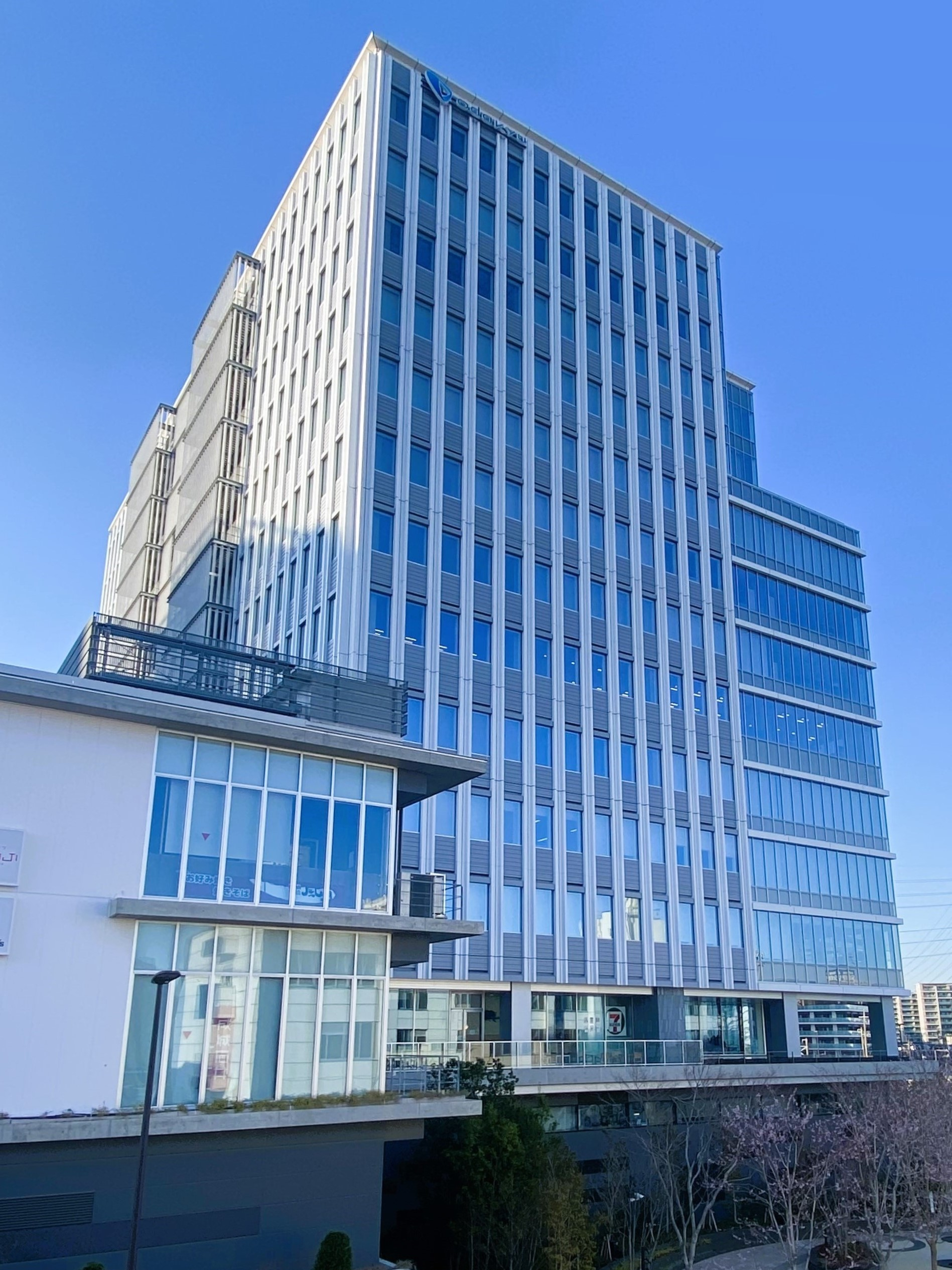
- Ebina Headquarters, Ebina, Kanagawa
- Native name: 小田急電鉄株式会社
- Romanized name: Odakyu Dentetsu kabushiki gaisha
- Type: Subsidiary
- Industry: Transport
- Predecessor: Odawara Express Railway Co., Ltd.
- Founded: 1 June 1948; 78 years ago
- Headquarters: 2-2 Megumi-cho, Ebina, Kanagawa; 1-8-3 Nishi-Shinjuku, Shinjuku, Tokyo; (Registered in 2-8-12 Yoyogi, Shibuya, Tokyo)
- Key people: Koji Hoshino (Board chairman & representative director); Shigeru Suzuki (President & CEO)
- Revenue: ▲¥1,812 million (JFY24)
- Net income: ▼¥256 million (JFY24)
- Parent: Odakyu Group
- Website: www.odakyu.jp

Odakyu Electric Railway Company, Ltd. (Japanese: 小田急電鉄, Hepburn: Odakyū Dentetsu kabushiki gaisha) is a major private railway operator based in Tokyo, Japan, and the core transportation company of the Odakyu Group. The company operates three railway lines: the Odawara Line, its principal route connecting Shinjuku and Odawara; and two branch lines, the Enoshima Line and the Tama Line.

Together, the network extends approximately 120.5 kilometres (74.9 mi) and serves 70 stations across 27 cities, wards, towns, and villages in Tokyo and Kanagawa, covering an area with a population of about 5.2 million. Several stations function as regional transport hubs, each handling average daily passenger volumes of around 100,000, and connect dense urban and suburban areas with tourist destinations such as Hakone and Enoshima. Odakyu is well known for its Romancecar limited express services, which link central Tokyo with destinations including Odawara, Enoshima, Tama New Town, and the Hakone area.

In addition to Odakyu Electric Railway, the transportation division of the Odakyu Group also operates two other railway businesses: Enoshima Electric Railway and Odakyu Hakone.

== History ==
=== Pre-WWII ===
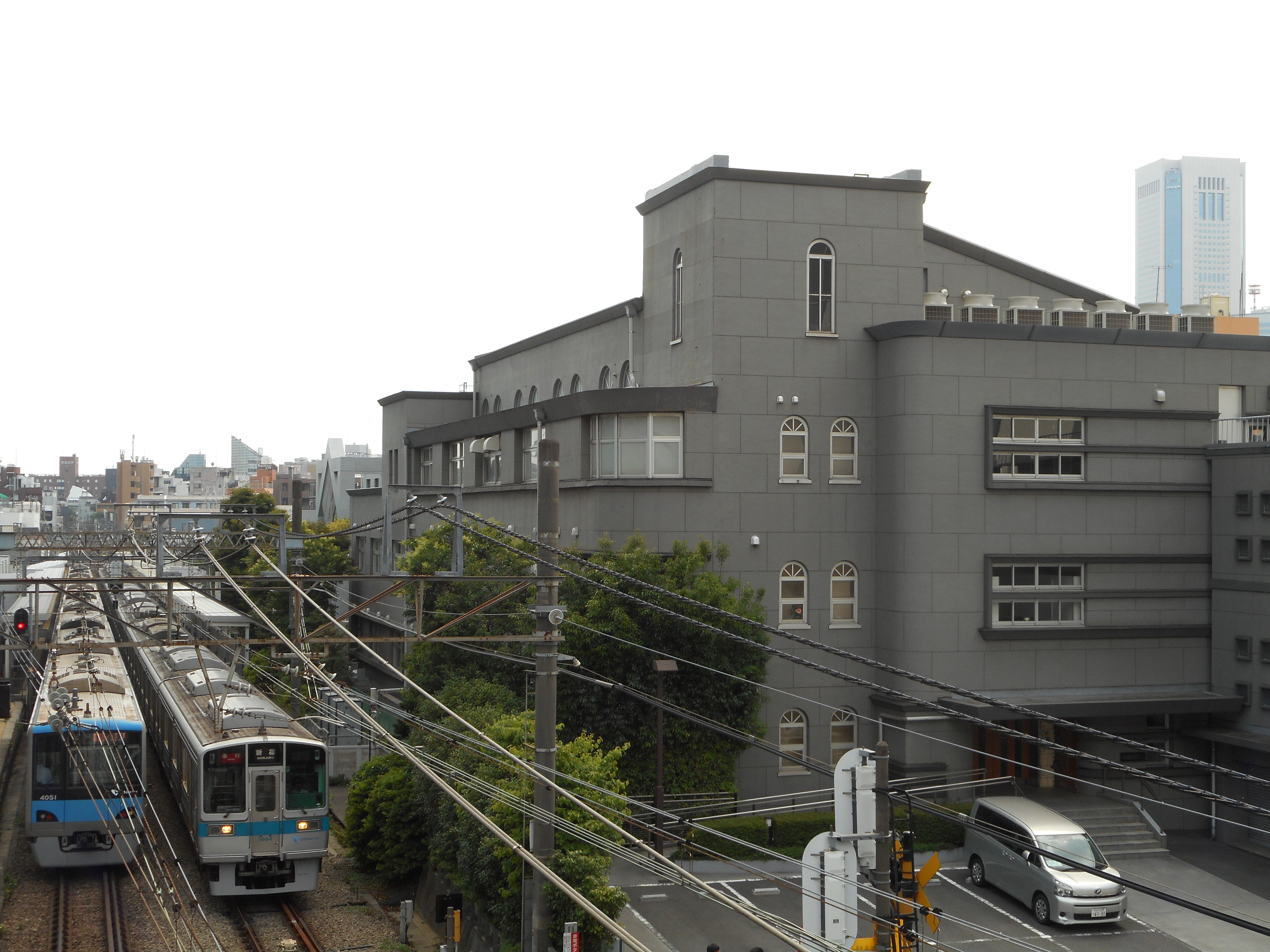
Registered office near Minami-Shinjuku station, also former headquarters

The 83 km (52 mi) line from Shinjuku to Odawara opened for service on 1 April 1927. Unlike the Odawara line, rarely were pre-World War II Japanese private railways constructed with double-track and fully electrified from the first day of operation. Two years later, on 1 April 1929, the Enoshima Line was added.

The original full name of the railroad was Odawara Express Railway Company, Ltd. (小田原急行鉄道株式会社, Odawara Kyūkō Tetsudō kabushiki gaisha), but this was often shortened to Odawara Kyūkō (小田原急行; "Odawara Express"). The abbreviation Odakyu was made popular by the title song of the 1929 movie Tōkyō kōshinkyoku and eventually became the official name of the railroad on March 1, 1941.

On 1 May 1942, Odakyu merged with the Tokyo-Yokohama Electric Railway company (now Tokyu Corporation), which controlled all private railway services west and south of Tokyo by the end of World War II.

=== Post-WWII ===
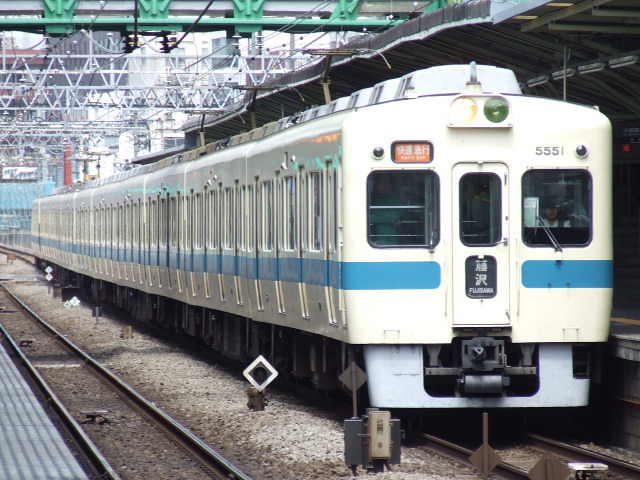
Odakyu 5000 series EMU near Mukōgaoka-Yūen Station

The company regained its independence on June 1, 1948, and it obtained a large amount of Hakone Tozan Railway stocks, instead of separating Keio Inokashira Line for Keio Corporation. Odakyu restarted Non-stop Limited Express service between Shinjuku and Odawara in 1948. In 1950, Odakyu trains ran through to Hakone-Yumoto on Hakone Tozan Line. Odakyu uses 1,067 mm (3 ft 6 in) narrow-gauge tracks, but the Hakone Tozan Railway is 1,435 mm (4 ft 8 1/2 in) standard gauge, so one track of the section from Odawara to Hakone-Yumoto (6.1 km (3.8 mi)) was changed to a dual gauge system. Odakyu operated the first Romancecar (1710 series) limited express in 1951.

After the 1950s, due to rapid Japanese economic growth, Odakyu was faced with an explosive increase of population along with its lines. Commuter passengers had to use very crowded trains every morning, and complained strongly with the delay of improvements from the railway company. Odakyu began construction on the - "Shinjuku Station Great Improvement Project" setting 5 lines and 10 platforms long enough for 10 standard commuter cars with service on the Chiyoda Line, among others. Plans for a four-track system in 1964 were prevented by residents of Setagaya Ward in Tokyo, as such the system remains uncompleted. The Setagaya Residents' opposition set the stage for a long-term and remarkable case in the courts and legislature. Odakyu could not take main part of transport from Tama New Town Area, though Odakyu started the operation of Tama Line in 1974. To serve its Mukōgaoka-Yūen Amusement Park, Odakyu operated the Mukōgaoka-Yūen Monorail Line between Mukōgaoka-Yūen and Mukōgaoka-Yūen-Seimon (1.1 km (0.68 mi), 2 stations) beginning in 1966 using a Lockheed Corporation style monorail system; the system was closed in 2001 when the amusement park was shut down.

=== Post-millennium ===
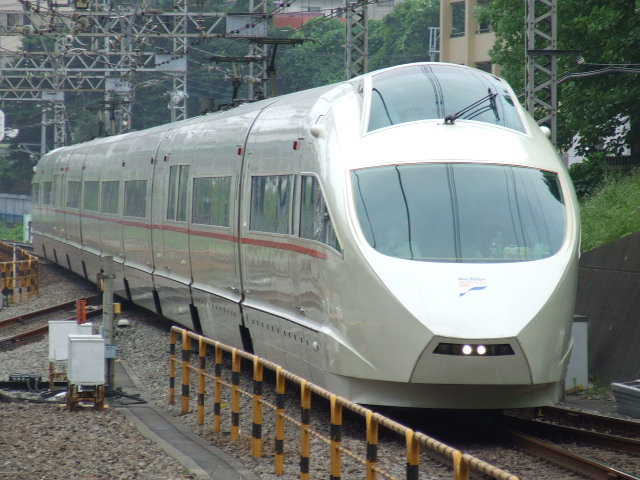
An Odakyu 50000 series VSE Romancecar near Shin-Yurigaoka station

Since 2000, Odakyu has been adding track in both directions from Izumi-Tamagawa Station, on Tama River, the border station of Tokyo, to just outside Setagaya-Daita Station for expanding the availability of express trains, especially for morning commuter service. The lines between Setagaya-Daita and Higashi-Kitazawa Station are still under construction, however. Odakyu announced that the bottle-neck will be resolved by 2013.

All of its lines are double- or quadruple-tracked within Tokyo Metropolis as of March 2018, a project first decided in December 1964 but due to NIMBY land acquisition difficulties, complex and expensive workarounds were constructed and finished, taking a half century. The main or Odawara Line acts as a bypass route for the Tōkaidō Main Line from Tokyo to western Kanagawa. The Romancecar 3000 series "SE" was tested at speeds of up to 145 km/h (90 mph) in 1957, achieving a world record for narrow-gauge 1,067 mm (3 ft 6 in) lines at the time. These tests also provided important data on high-speed electric multiple units (EMU), which Japanese National Railways (JNR) used for its limited express EMUs, 151 series, and 0 Series Shinkansen introduced in the early 1960s.

Odakyu celebrated its 80th anniversary in April 2007. The 50th anniversary of the Romancecar was celebrated in September 2007.

Station numbers were introduced to all Odakyu Line stations in 2014, with stations numbered using the prefix "OH".

Odakyu are the current shirt sponsors of football club Machida Zelvia.

On 6 August 2021, a mass stabbing incident occurred on one of its commuter services when a man stabbed nine passengers, seriously injuring a woman before trying to ignite a fire on the compartment. The man escaped and was arrested hours later.

== Lines ==
Geographic map of the Odakyu Electric Railway

Odakyu owns three railway lines directly, and another three lines via subsidiaries. It also operates trains onto the Tokyo Metro Chiyoda Line, JR East Jōban Line, and JR Central Gotemba Line.

Line	Section	Length (km)	Stations	Date opened
Odawara Line	Shinjuku – Odawara	82.5	47	April 1, 1927
Enoshima Line	Sagami-Ōno – Katase-Enoshima	27.4	17	April 1, 1929
Tama Line	Shin-Yurigaoka – Karakida	10.6	8	June 1, 1974 (in part); March 27, 1990 (full)
Total	3 lines	120.5	70	

- Not including the connecting branch between Odawara Line and JR Central Gotemba Line near Shin-Matsuda Station.
- Many Odakyu Tama Line trains (and selected Odawara Line trains from Hon-Atsugi) continue on to the Chiyoda and Jōban lines for Ayase and - Toride stations. This service began in 1978 between Hon-Atsugi and Abiko stations.
- Some Odakyu trains continue on the Odakyu-owned Hakone Tozan Line to Hakone-Yumoto.
- Limited express Mt. Fuji trains travel from Shinjuku through on the JR Central Gotemba Line to Gotemba Station eight times a day.

== Train classification ==
(As of March 17, 2018 timetable revision)

Color	Classification	Runs between	Line(s)
	Limited Express (Romancecar)	Shinjuku, Kita-Senju, and Shin-Kiba to Hakone-Yumoto, Katase-Enoshima, Karakida or Numazu	Odawara, Enoshima, Tama; Hakone Tozan; JR Central Gotemba; and Tokyo Metro Chiyoda and Yūrakuchō
	Rapid Express	Shinjuku to Odawara or Fujisawa (one service on weekdays to Katase-Enoshima)	Odawara and Enoshima
	Express	Shinjuku to Odawara, Katase-Enoshima or Karakida	Odawara, Enoshima, and Tama
	Commuter Express	All services operate in the weekday morning rush hour for Shinjuku from Karakida on the Odakyu Tama Line	Odawara, Tama
	Semi Express	All services operate between Yoyogi-Uehara and Isehara during the offpeak and evening rush hour	Odawara Line, Chiyoda Line, Joban Line
	Commuter Semi Express	All Services operate in the weekday morning rush hour for Yoyogi-Uehara through to the Chiyoda Line from Hon-Atsugi	Odakyu Odawara Line, Chiyoda Line, Joban Line
	Local	In all sections, includes to/from Hakone-Yumoto on Hakone Tozan Line (occasionally between Odawara and Shin-Matsuda)	Odawara, Enoshima, Tama; and Hakone Tozan

Odakyu Line Map

== Limited express service ==
=== Shinjuku Station routes ===
Commuter service is shown on each line's page.

Station	Japanese	Distance (km)	Super Hakone	Hakone	Sagami	Mt. Fuji	Enoshima	Home Way	Lines
Shinjuku	新宿	-	●	●	●	●	●	●	Odakyu Odawara Line
Mukōgaoka-Yūen	向ヶ丘遊園	15.8	｜	■	■	｜	｜	｜	Odakyu Odawara Line
Shin-Yurigaoka	新百合ヶ丘	21.5	｜	■	■	｜	●	■	Odakyu Odawara Line
Machida	町田	30.8	｜	●	●	●	｜	■	Odakyu Odawara Line
Sagami-Ōno	相模大野	32.3	｜	■	■	｜	●	■	Odakyu Odawara Line
Hon-Atsugi	本厚木	45.4	｜	■	●	●	∥	●	Odakyu Odawara Line
Hadano	秦野	61.7	｜	■	■	｜	∥	●	Odakyu Odawara Line
Shin-Matsuda	新松田	71.8	｜	■	■	∥	∥	｜	Odakyu Odawara Line
Odawara	小田原	82.5	●	●	●	∥	∥	●	Odakyu Odawara Line
Hakone-Yumoto	箱根湯本	88.6	●	●		∥	∥	●	Hakone Tozan Line
Yamato	大和	39.9				∥	●	●	Odakyu Enoshima Line
Fujisawa	藤沢	55.4				∥	●	●	Odakyu Enoshima Line
Katase-Enoshima	片瀬江ノ島	59.9				∥	●	●	Odakyu Enoshima Line
Odakyu-Nagayama	小田急永山	28.3				∥		●	Odakyu Tama Line
Odakyu-Tama-Center	小田急多摩センター	30.6				∥		●	Odakyu Tama Line
Karakida	唐木田	32.1				∥		●	Odakyu Tama Line
Matsuda	松田	71.8				●			JR Central Gotemba Line
Suruga-Oyama	駿河小山	86.2				■			JR Central Gotemba Line
Gotemba	御殿場	97.1				●			JR Central Gotemba Line

- Mt. Fuji trains run on the connecting branch line just before Shin-Matsuda from Shinjuku and stops at Matsuda on the Gotemba Line. Matsuda and Shin-Matsuda are treated as the same station.
- Home Way trains run from Shinjuku every evening after 18:00. There is no service to Shinjuku.

=== Tokyo Metro routes ===
Commuter services are shown on each line's page.

Station	Japanese	Distance (km)	Metro Homeway	Metro Hakone	Metro Sagami	Lines
Kita-Senju	北千住	0.0	●	●	●	Tokyo Metro Chiyoda Line
Ōtemachi	大手町	9.9	●	●	●	Tokyo Metro Chiyoda Line
Kasumigaseki	霞ヶ関	12.1	●	●	●	Tokyo Metro Chiyoda Line
Omotesandō	表参道	16.2	●	●	●	Tokyo Metro Chiyoda Line
Yoyogi-Uehara	代々木上原	19.3	*	*	*	Tokyo Metro Chiyoda Line
Yoyogi-Uehara	代々木上原	19.3	*	*	*	Odakyu Odawara Line
Seijōgakuen-Mae	成城学園前	27.4	■	｜	■	Odakyu Odawara Line
Shin-Yurigaoka	新百合ヶ丘	37.3	■	｜	■	Odakyu Odawara Line
Machida	町田	46.6	●	●	●	Odakyu Odawara Line
Hon-Atsugi	本厚木	61.2	｜	●	●	Odakyu Odawara Line
Odawara	小田原	98.3	∥	●		Odakyu Odawara Line
Odawara	小田原	98.3	∥	●		Hakone Tozan Line
Hakone-Yumoto	箱根湯本	104.4	∥	●		Hakone Tozan Line
Odakyu-Nagayama	小田急永山	44.1	●			Odakyu Tama Line
Odakyu-Tama-Center	小田急多摩センター	46.4	●			Odakyu Tama Line
Karakida	唐木田	47.9	●			Odakyu Tama Line

- At Yoyogi-Uehara, all trains pause, but there is no service for passengers; Odakyu and Tokyo Metro change their operating staff at the station.
- On weekday mornings, Metro Sagami trains run once from Hon-Atsugi to Kita-Senju.
- On weekday evenings, Metro Homeway trains run twice from Hon-Atsugi to Kita-Senju and once from Ōtemachi to Hon-Atsugi.
- On weekends and holidays, Metro Hakone trains run between Kita-Senju and Hakone-Yumoto four times; Metro Sagami (once in the morning) and Metro Homeway (once in the evening) trains also run between Kita-Senju and Hon-Atsugi.

=== Legend ===
Symbol	Definition
●	all trains stop
■	some trains stop
｜	all trains pass
∥	trains do not travel through this section

== Rolling stock ==
=== Romancecar sets ===
- 30000 series "EXE/EXEalpha" (introduced 1996)
- 60000 series "MSE" (introduced 2008)
- 70000 series "GSE" (introduced 2018)

Former

- 3000 series "SE" (1957–1991)
- 3100 series "NSE" (1963–2000)
- 7000 series "LSE" (1980–2018)
- 10000 series "HiSE" (1987–2012)
- 20000 series "RSE" (1991–2012)
- 50000 series "VSE" (2005–2022)
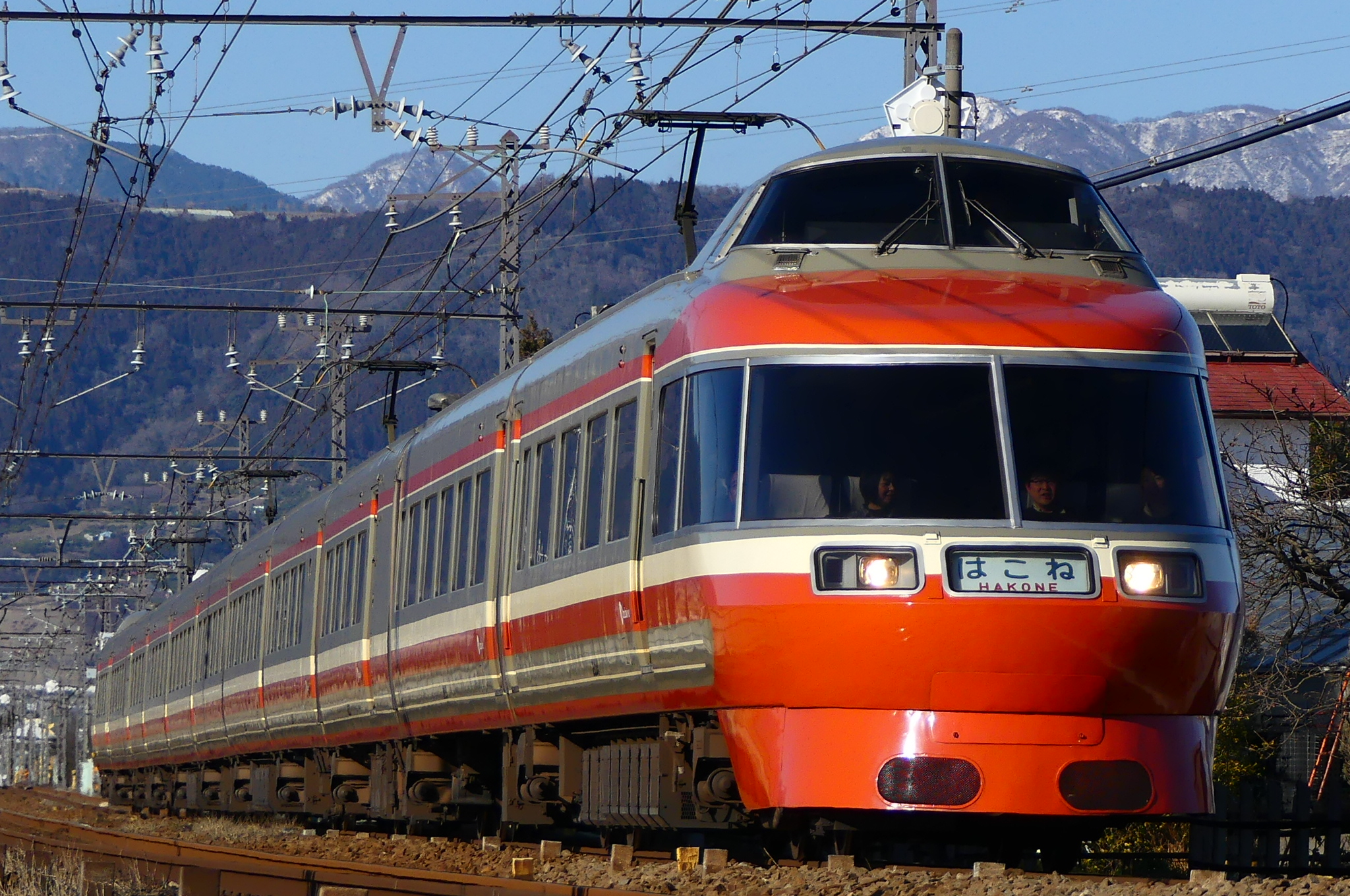
7000 series "LSE"

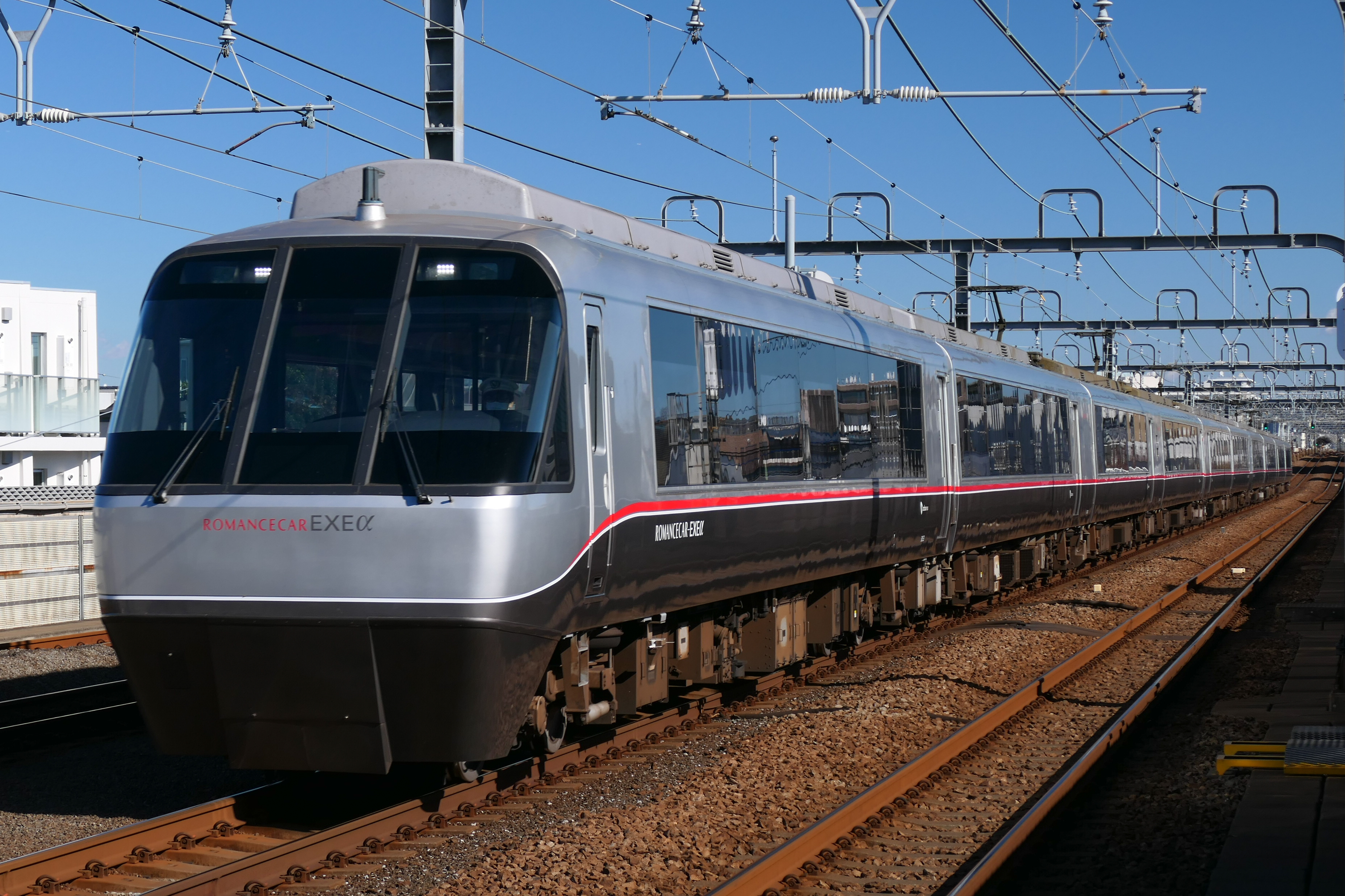
30000 series "EXEalpha"

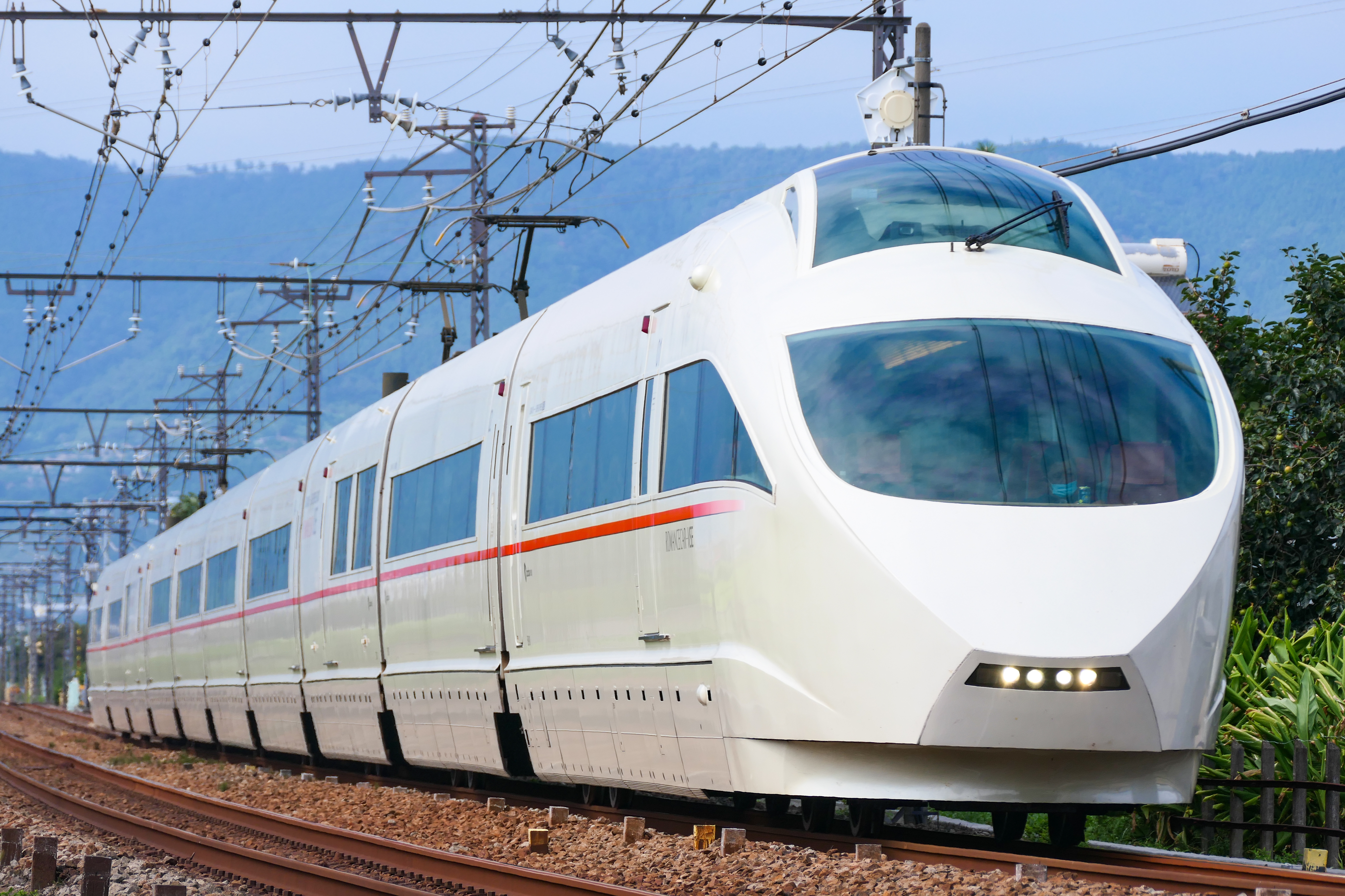
50000 series "VSE"

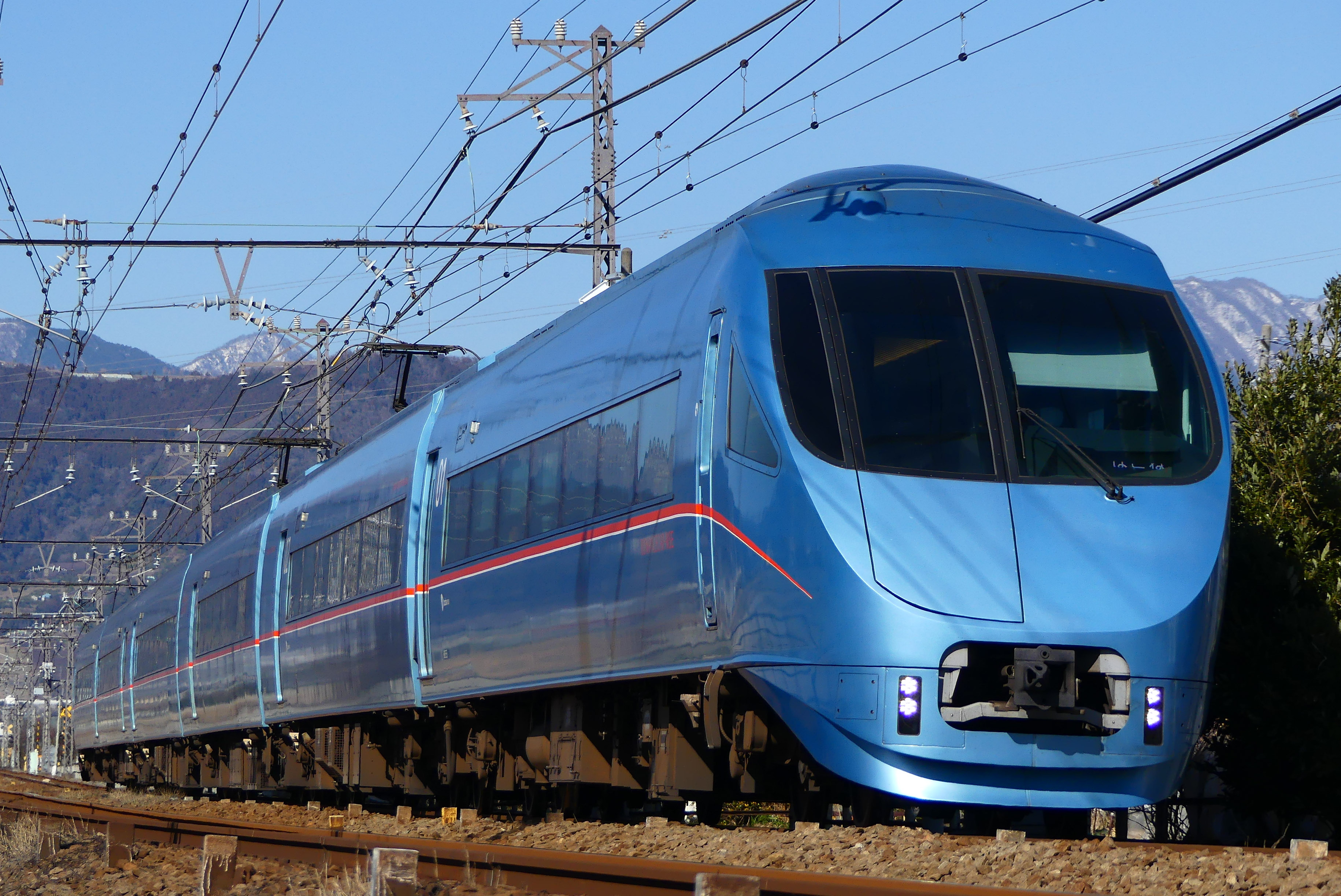
60000 series "MSE

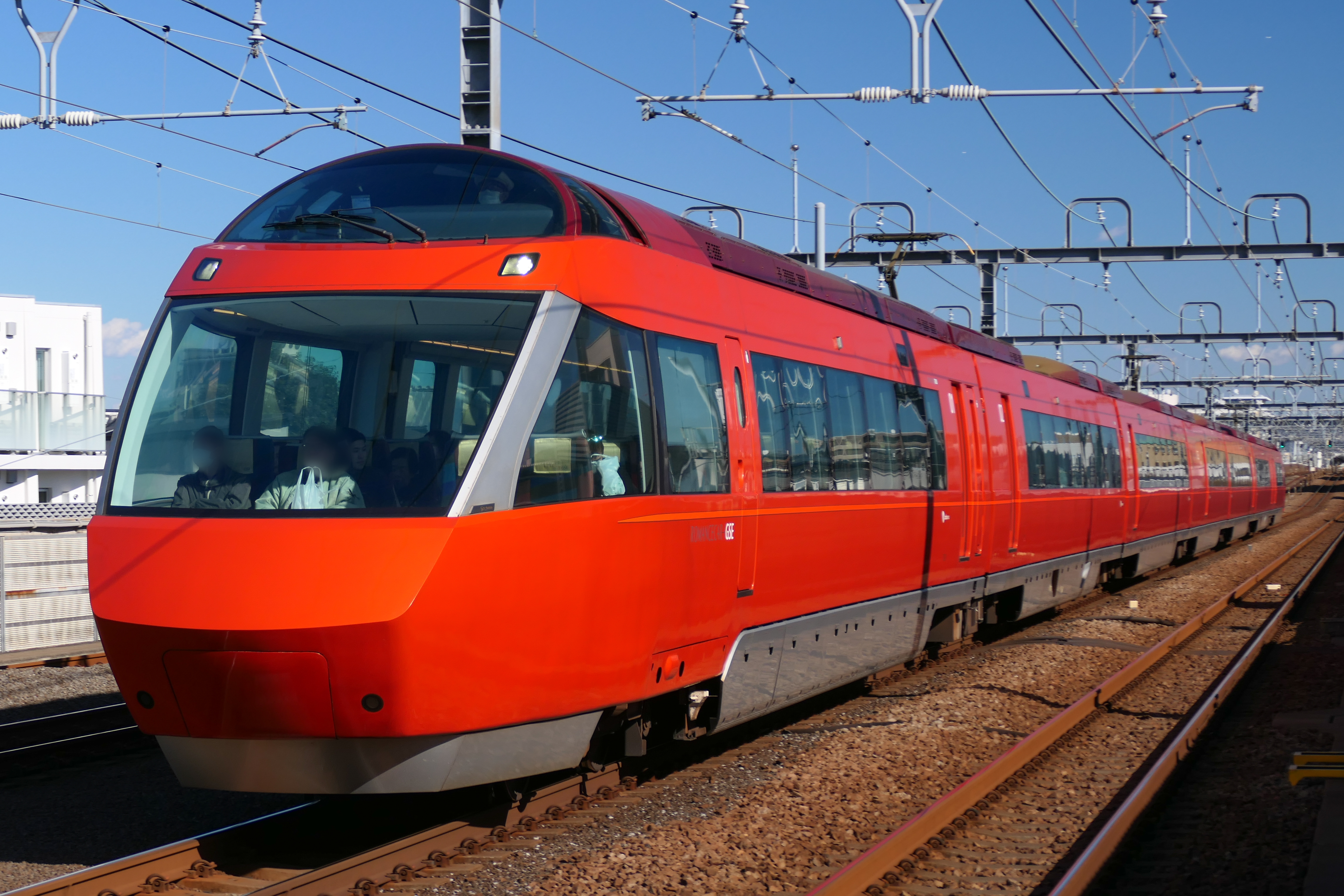
70000 series "GSE"

=== Commuter sets ===
Current

- 1000 series (introduced 1988)
- 2000 series (introduced 1995)
- 3000 series (introduced 2002)
- 4000 series (introduced 2007)
- 5000 series (introduced 2020)
- 8000 series (introduced 1983)

Former

- 5000 series (1969–2012)
- 9000 series (1972–2006)
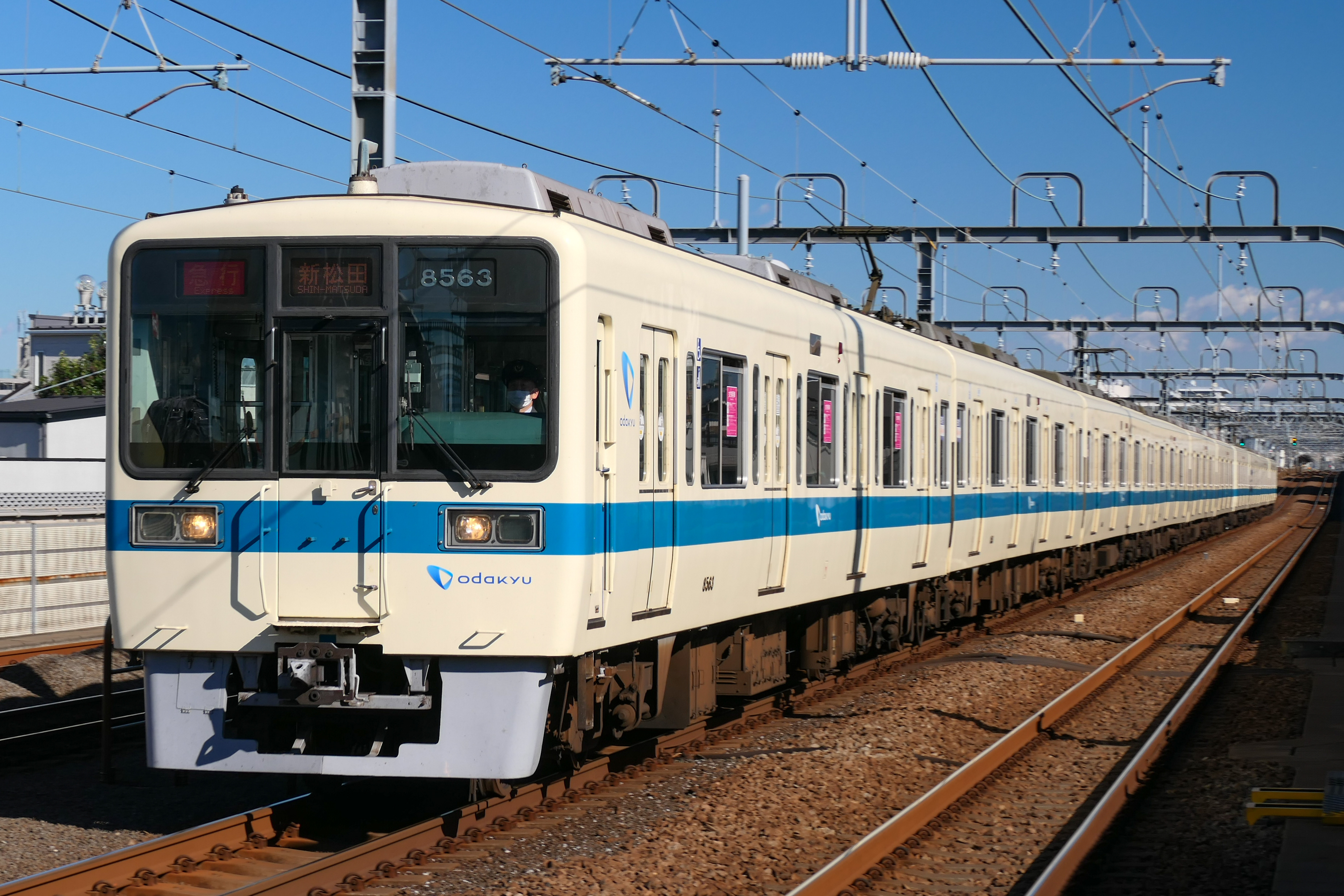
8000 series

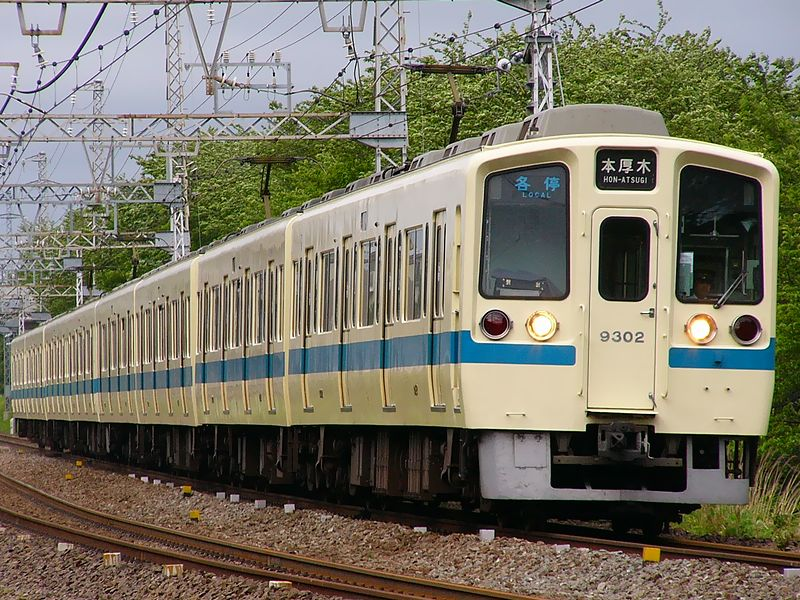
9000 series

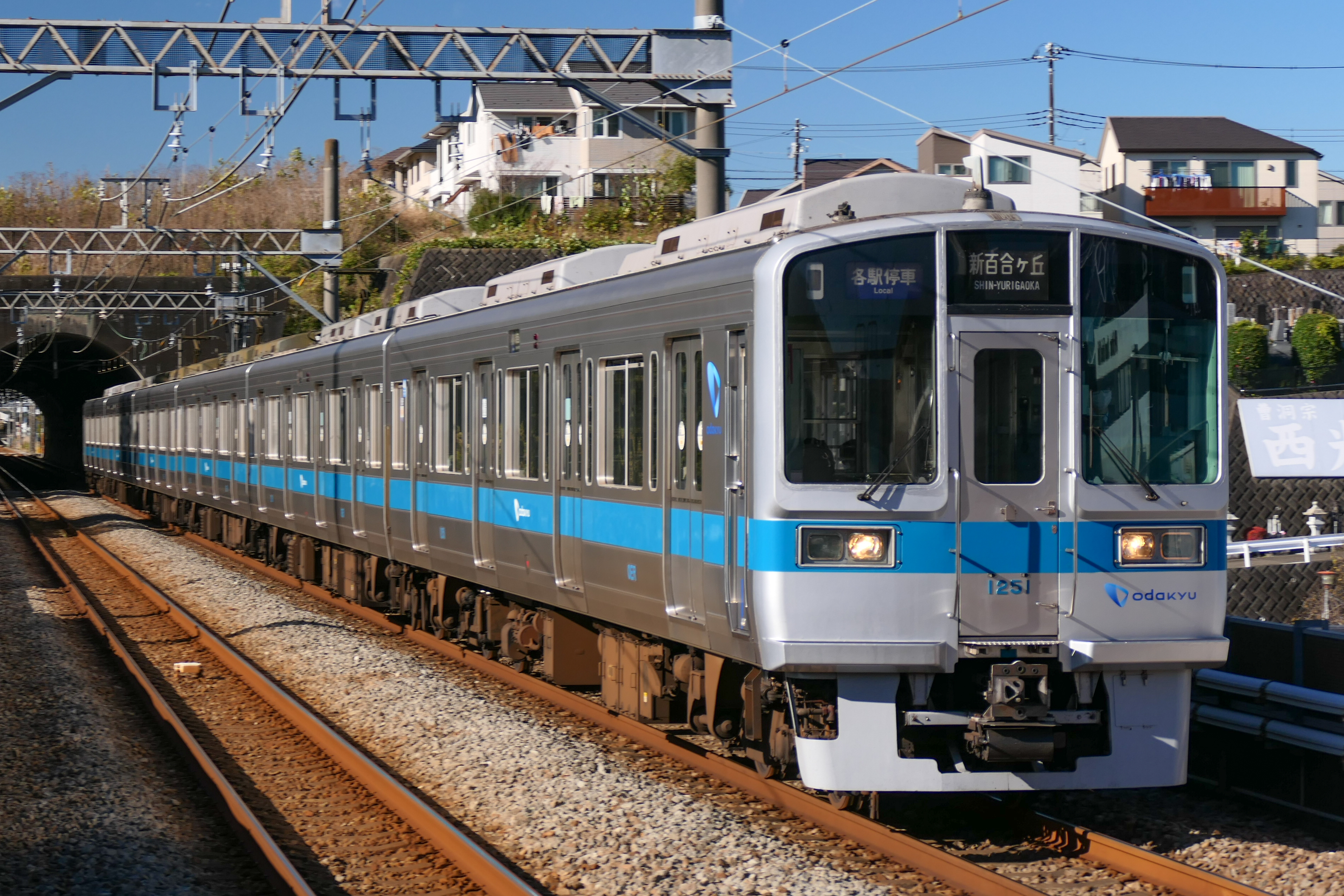
1000 series

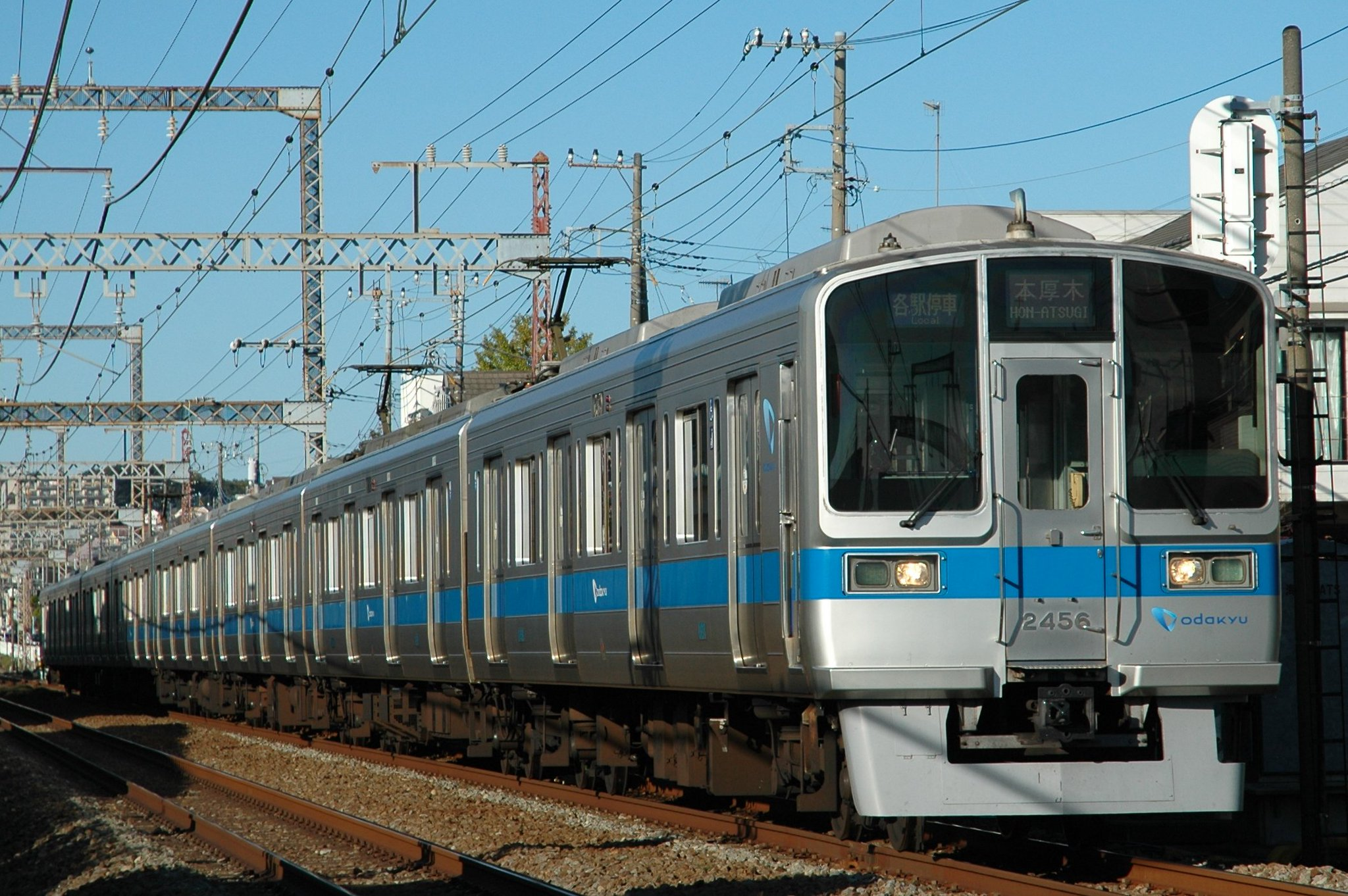
2000 series

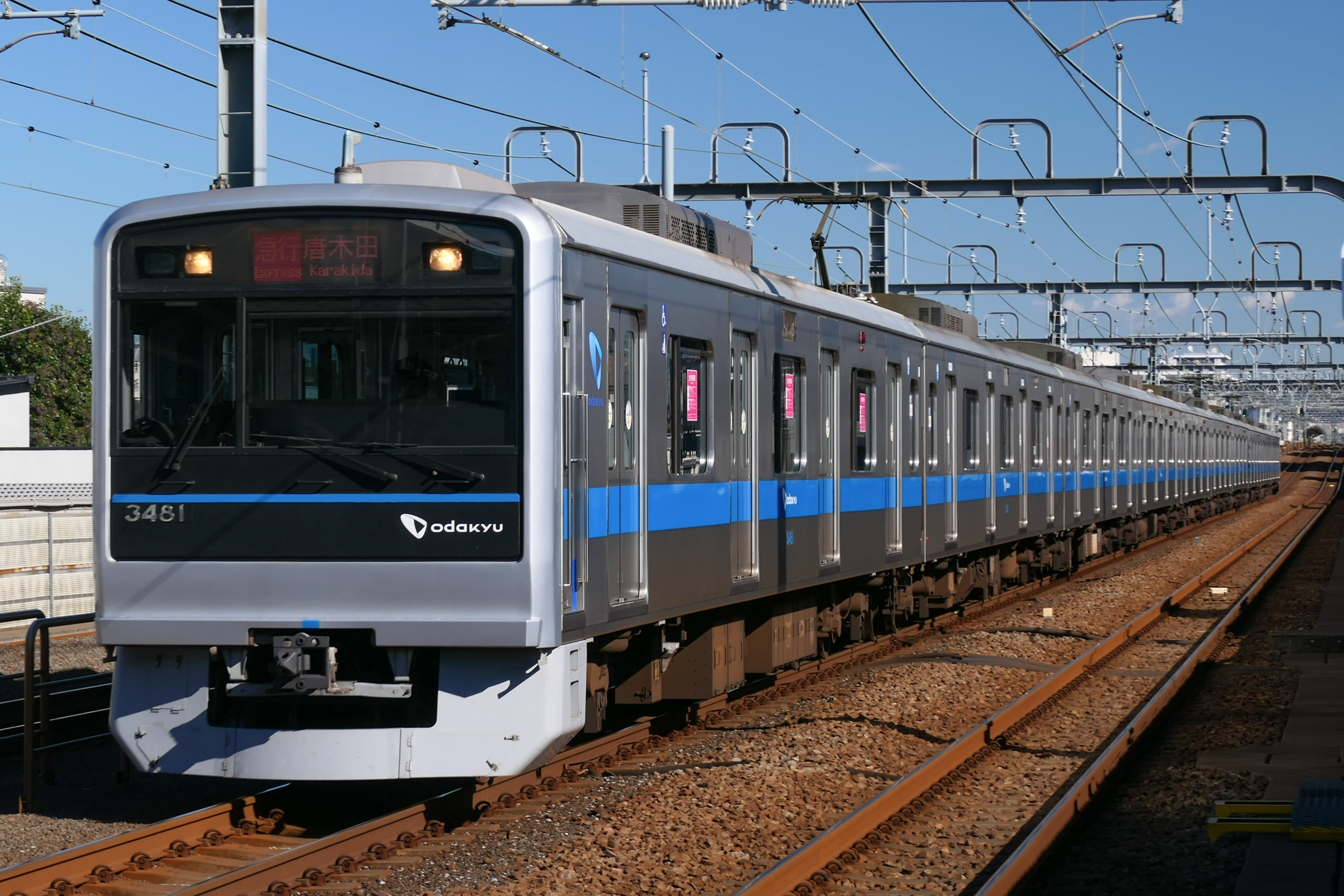
3000 series

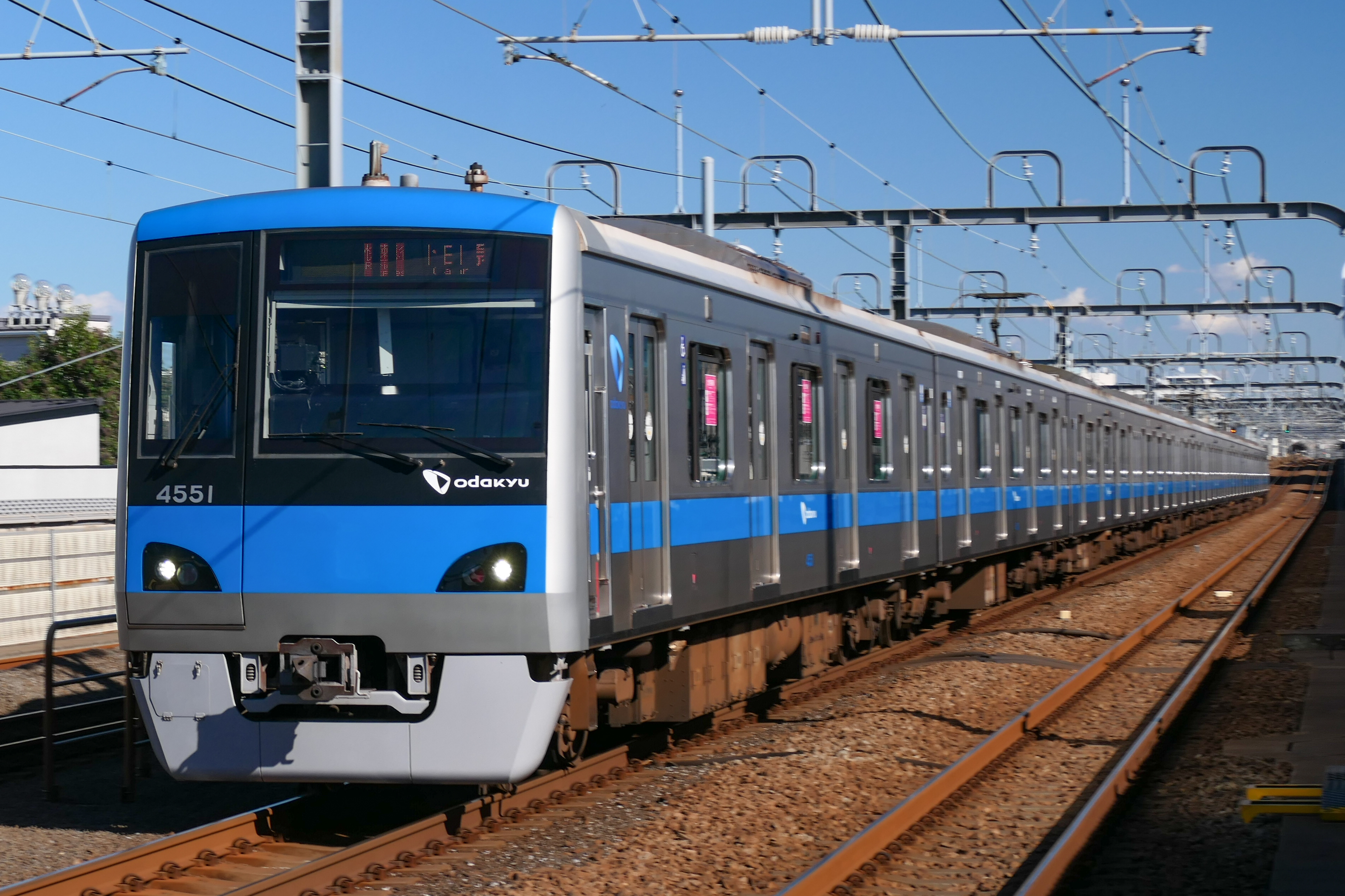
4000 series

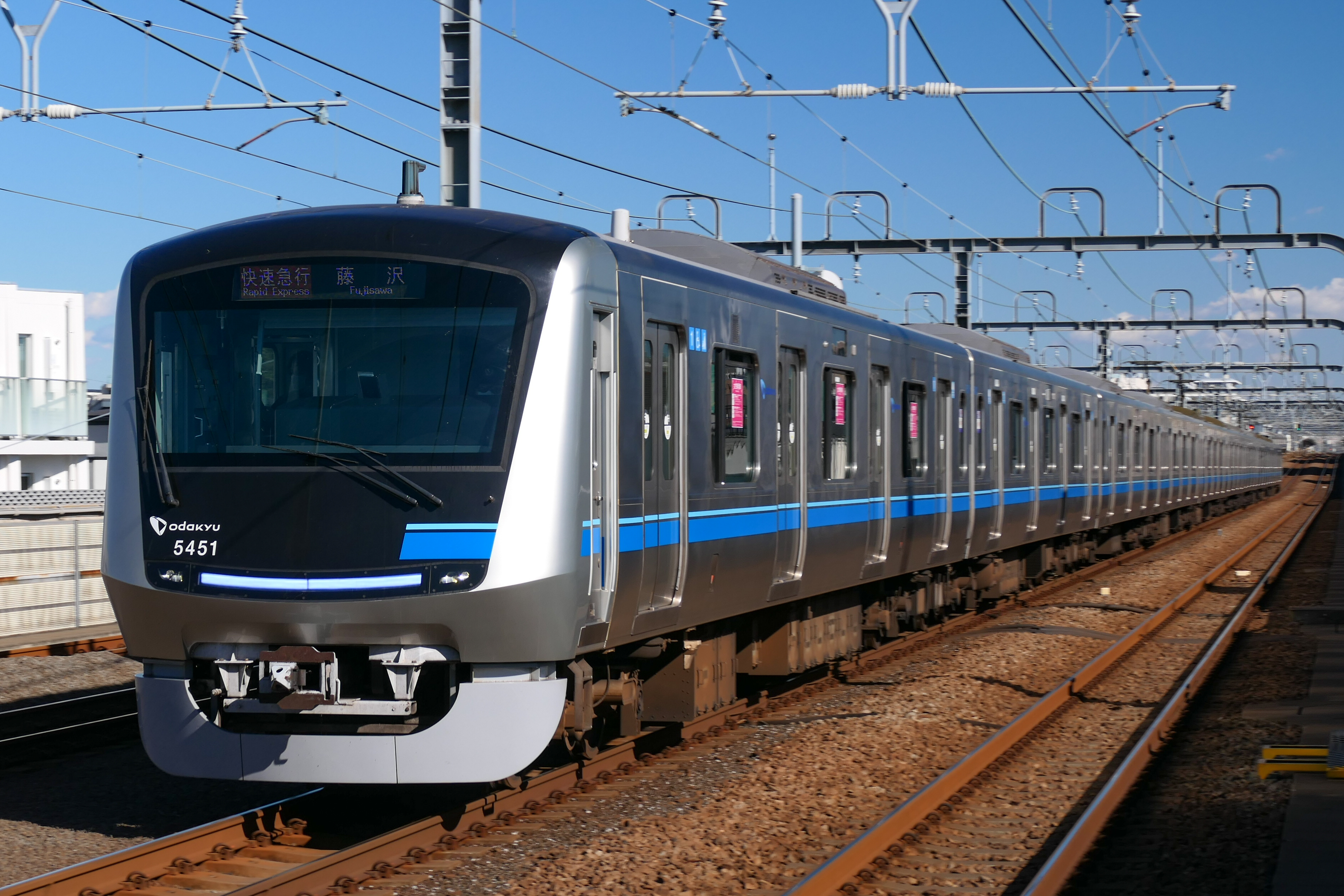
5000 series

== Odakyu Electric Railway in media ==
The Odakyu Railway has been included in several Japanese language train simulator programs as well as the English language Microsoft Train Simulator program. Microsoft Train Simulator includes the railway's Odawara and Hakone Tozan lines, collectively referred to as the "Tokyo-Hakone" route, with the 2000 series commuter trainset and the 7000 series "LSE" Romancecar trainset being player driveable. Several "activities", or scenarios, are included.

Various Odakyu add-ins are available for the BVE Train Simulator, a freeware cab view train simulator for Microsoft Windows.

== Bibliography ==
- Lee, A. (2011). Tokyo commute: Japanese customs and way of life viewed from the Odakyu Line. Folkestone, Kent: Renaissance Books.
