= Enoshima (train) =

Japanese limited express train service

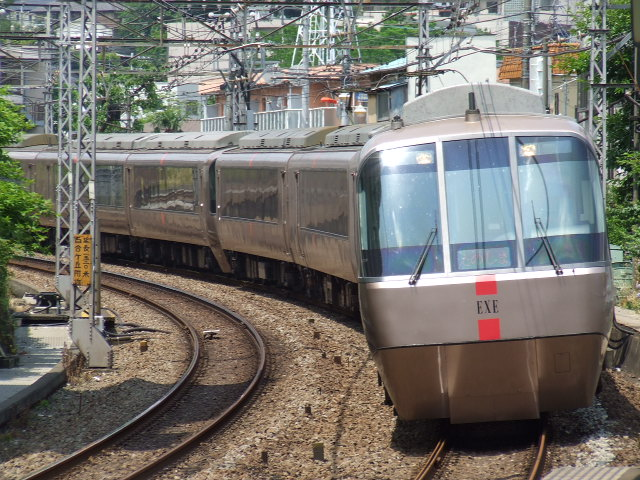
- An Odakyu 30000 series EXE on an Enoshima service near Yomiuri-Land-mae Station, June 2007

Overview
- Service type: Romancecar
- First service: 1964
- Current operator: Odakyu Electric Railway

Route
- Line used: Odakyū Enoshima Line

The Enoshima (えのしま) is a "Romancecar" limited express train operated by Odakyu Electric Railway between Shinjuku Station and Katase-Enoshima Station.

== Route ==
- Shinjuku - Shin-Yurigaoka - Sagami-Ōno - Yamato - Fujisawa - Katase-Enoshima

== Rolling stock ==
- Odakyu 30000 series EXE

=== Rolling stock used in the past ===
- Odakyu 3000 series SE
- Odakyu 3100 series NSE
- Odakyu 10000 series HiSE
- Odakyu 7000 series LSE
