= Enoshima (disambiguation) =

Enoshima is an island in Kanagawa prefecture, Japan.

Enoshima may also refer to:

- Enoshima (train)
- Enoshima, Miyagi, an island in Miyagi prefecture, Japan
- Enoshima-class minesweeper
