= Odakyu 7000 series LSE =

Electric multiple unit of Odakyu Electric Railway

Odakyu 7000 series Luxury Super Express
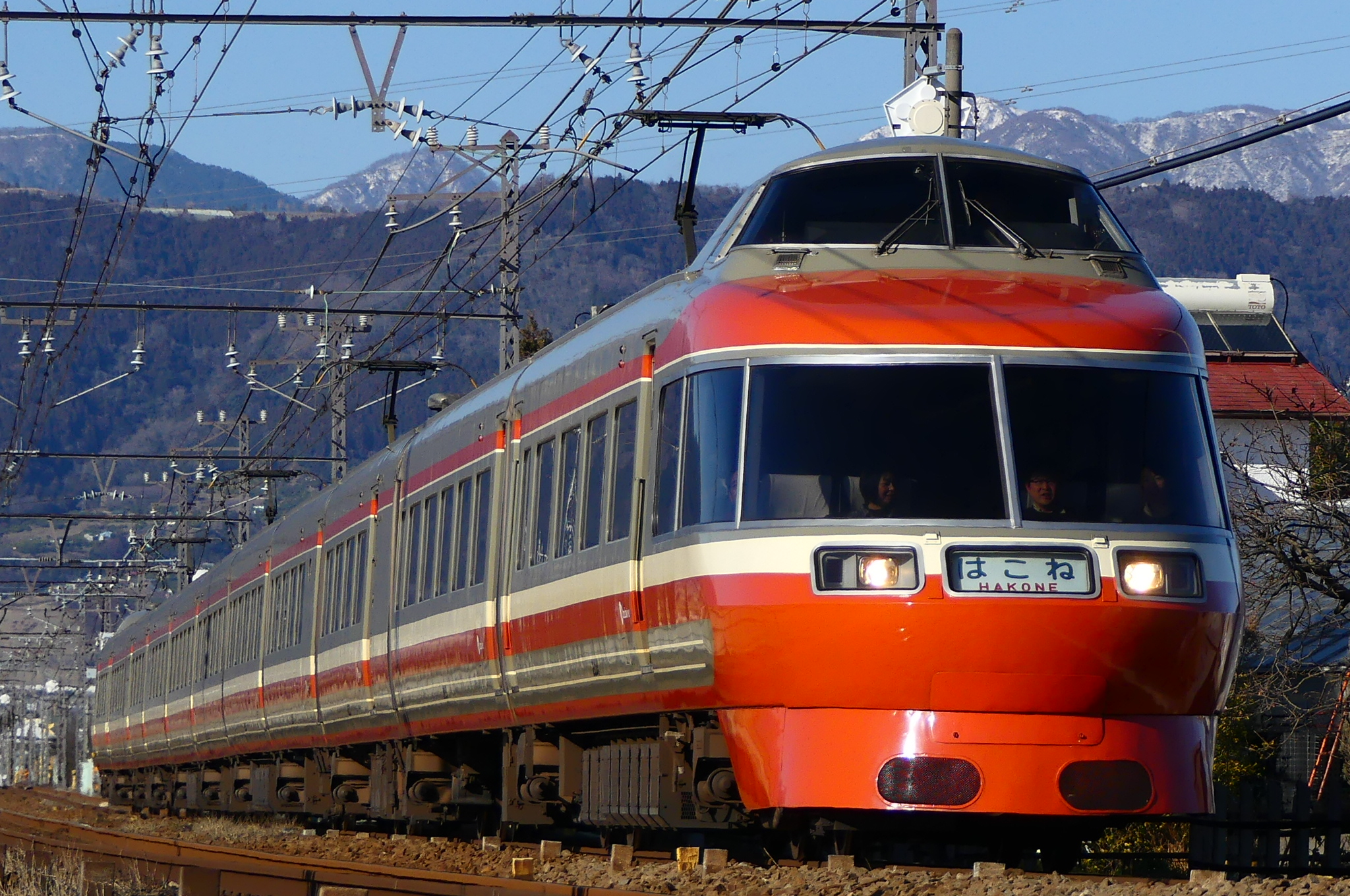
- Odakyu 7000 series LSE
- In service: December 1980 – 13 October 2018
- Manufacturer: Nippon Sharyo
- Family name: Romancecar
- Constructed: 1980–1983
- Entered service: 27 December 1980
- Refurbished: 1995–1997
- Number built: 44 vehicles (4 sets)
- Number in service: None
- Number scrapped: 22 vehicles (2 sets)
- Formation: 11 cars per set
- Fleet numbers: 7001–7004
- Operator: Odakyu Electric Railway
- Depot: Kitami

Specifications
- Maximum speed: 110 km/h (68 mph)
- Traction system: Electric camshaft (Resistor control)
- Electric system: 1,500 V DC
- Current collection: Overhead lines
- Track gauge: 1,067 mm (3 ft 6 in)

Notes/references
- This train won the 24th Blue Ribbon Award in 1981.

The Odakyu 7000 series LSE (小田急7000形, Odakyū 7000-gata) (Luxury Super Express) was an electric multiple unit (EMU) train type operated from December 1980 to July 2018 by Odakyu Electric Railway on "Romancecar" limited express services in Japan.

== Design ==
The 7000 series LSE trains were the first new "Romancecars" introduced since the Odakyu 3100 series NSE 17 years previously. The overall styling represented an evolution of the 3100 series design, with 11 articulated cars mounted on shared bogies. The external livery of orange vermilion, grey, and white was also identical to that carried by the 3100 series. The passenger doors continued the folding style, but were automatically operated instead of the manually operated doors of the 3100 series.

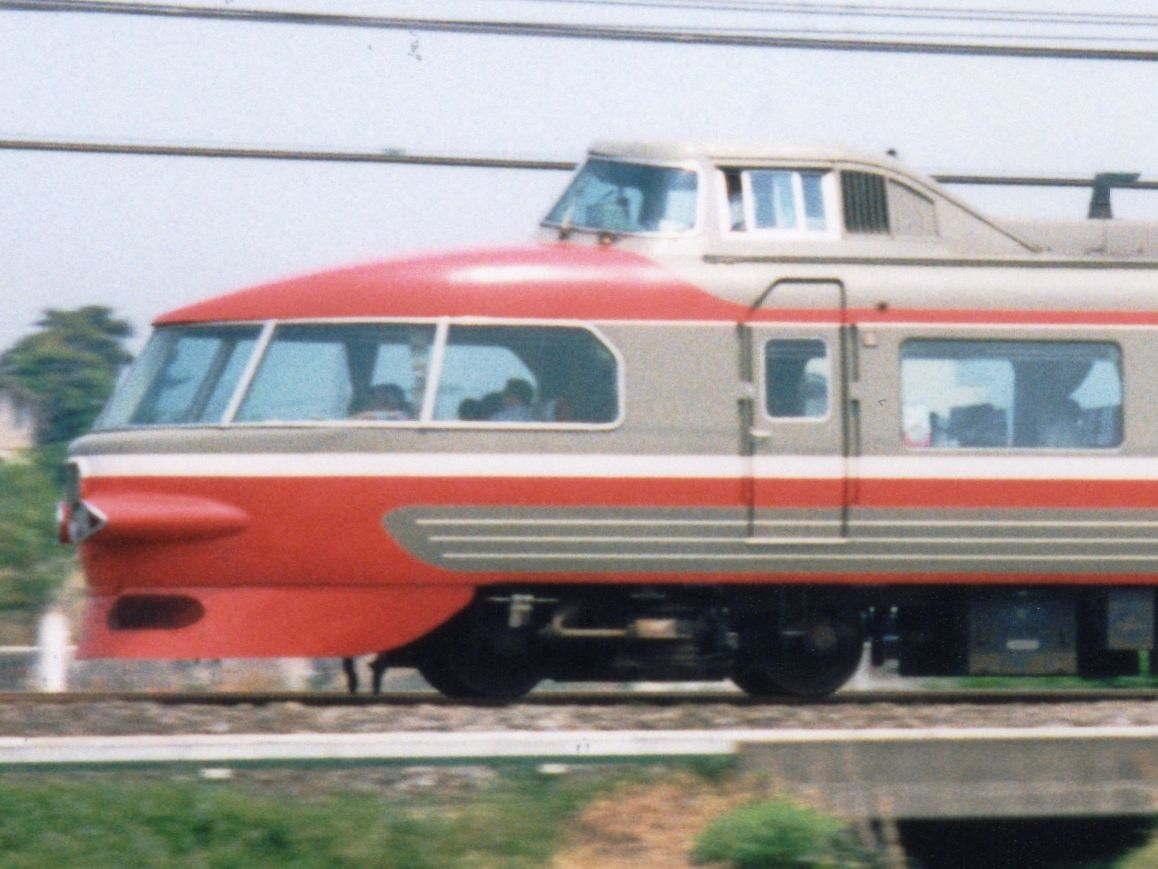
3100 series NSE side view

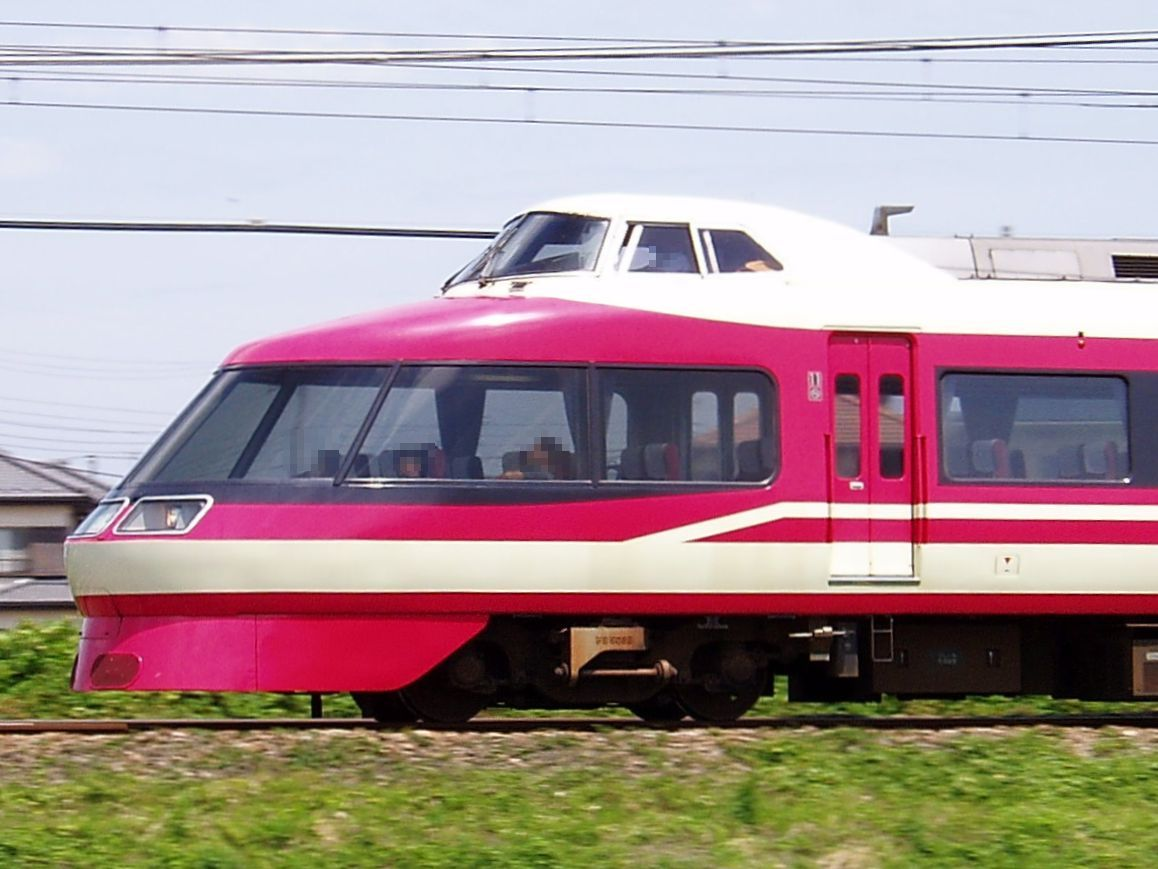
7000 series LSE side view

== Operations ==
The 7000 series LSE sets were normally used on Hakone and Super Hakone services between Shinjuku and Hakone-Yumoto, and on Sagami services.

== Formations ==
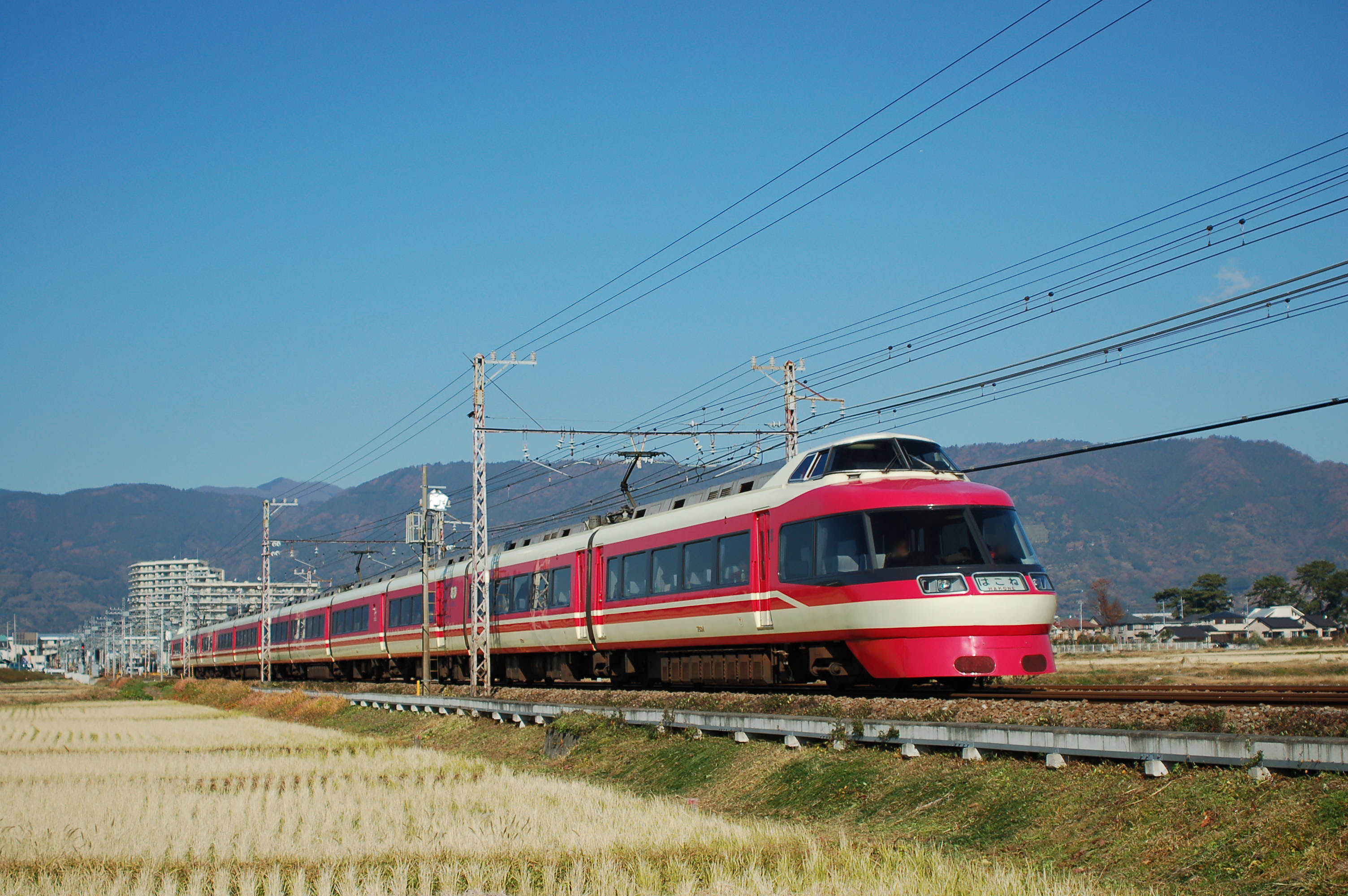
7000 series LSE in new livery, December 2007

The four 11-car articulated sets were formed as follows, with car 1 at the Odawara and Hakone end.

Car No.	1	2	3	4	5	6	7	8	9	10	11
Designation	M9c	M8	T2	M7	M6	M5	M4	M3	T1	M2	M1c
Numbering	7800	7700	7150	7600	7500	7400	7300	7200	7050	7100	7000

Cars 2, 5, 7, and 10 each had one single-arm pantograph.

== Interior ==
=== Passenger accommodation ===
Passenger accommodation consists of rotating/reclining pairs of seats arranged 2+2 abreast. All cars are no-smoking.

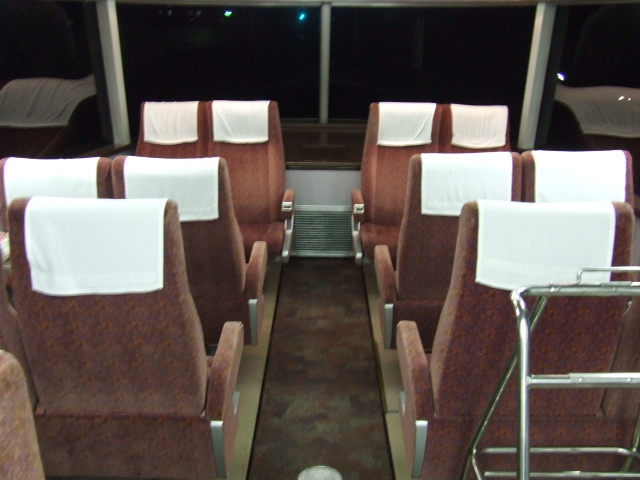
Observation car seating, July 2007

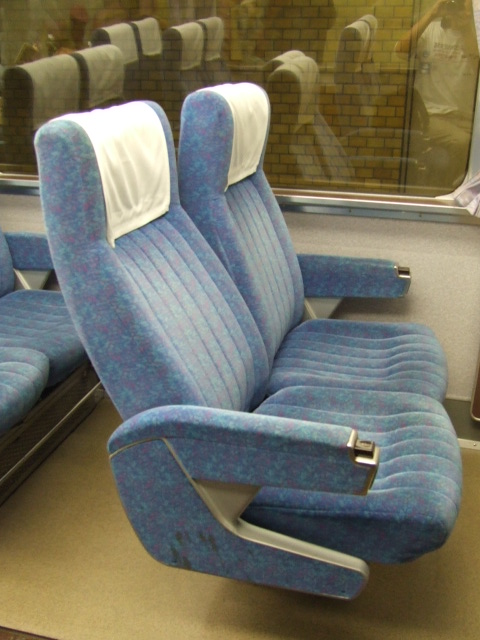
Seating with blue moquette, September 2006

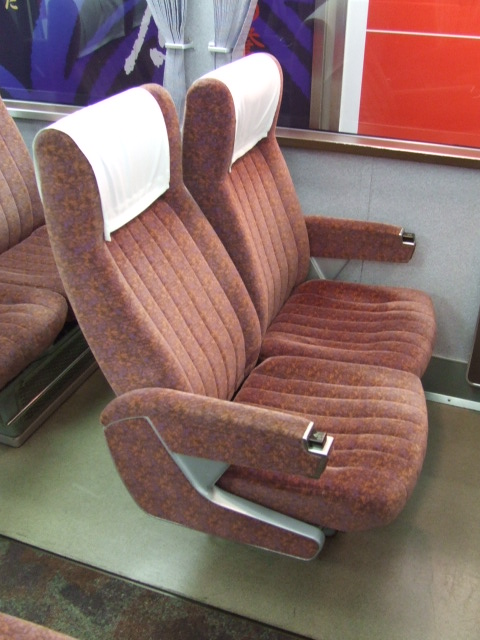
Seating with red moquette, October 2006

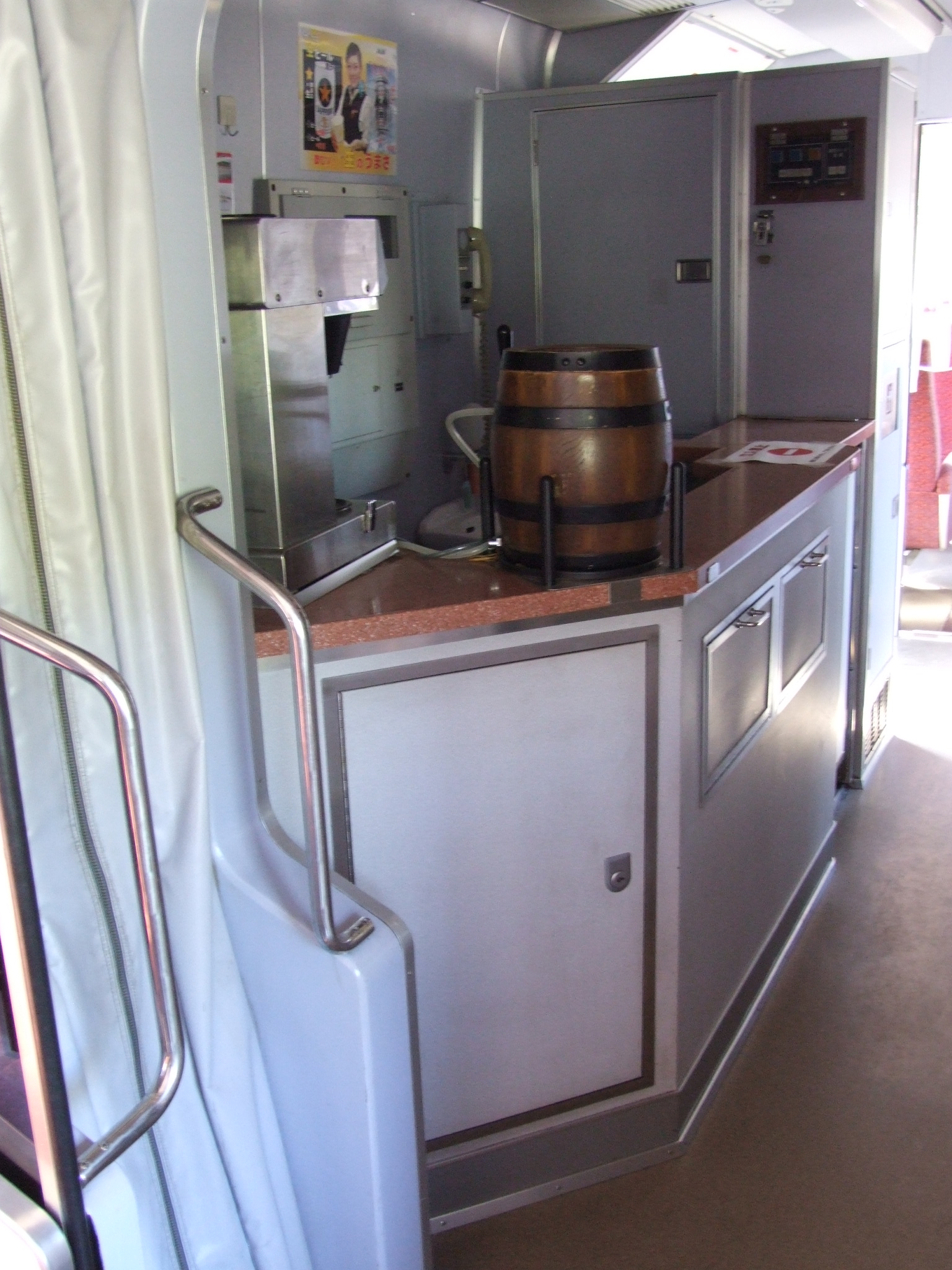
Former refreshment counter, October 2007

=== Facilities ===
Cars 4 and 8 have toilet and washing facilities. Cars 3 and 9 had refreshment counters, although since the 1990s, these are used as a base for trolley service sales.

== History ==
The first set, 7001, was delivered in December 1980, and entered service on 27 December of the same year. One set was delivered each subsequent year, with the final set, 7004, delivered in December 1983.

In 1981, the 7000 series LSE was awarded the Blue Ribbon Award, presented annually in Japan by the Japan Railfan Club for railway vehicles voted as being the most outstanding design of the year.

The fleet was refurbished between 1995 and 1997 to improve accessibility, and new seat moquette was added. At the same time, the sets were repainted into a new livery of wine red and white based on that applied to the Odakyu 10000 series HiSE sets.

From 2005, the original scissors-type pantographs were replaced with single-arm pantographs.

In 2007, set 7004 was repainted back into its original livery to mark the 80th anniversary of Odakyu.

In 2012, one of the two sets still in new livery was repainted back into the original livery, and the other set was withdrawn as of 19 February 2012, leaving two sets in service, both in the original livery.

The last set was withdrawn from regular service on 10 July 2018 after it was used on the Home Way No. 83 service. The sets have been completely retired from service on 13 October 2018.

== In popular culture ==
The 7000 LSE is a player-driveable train in the 2001 Microsoft Train Simulator railroad simulator.
