= Romancecar =

Generic name of the limited express trains of Odakyu Electric Railway

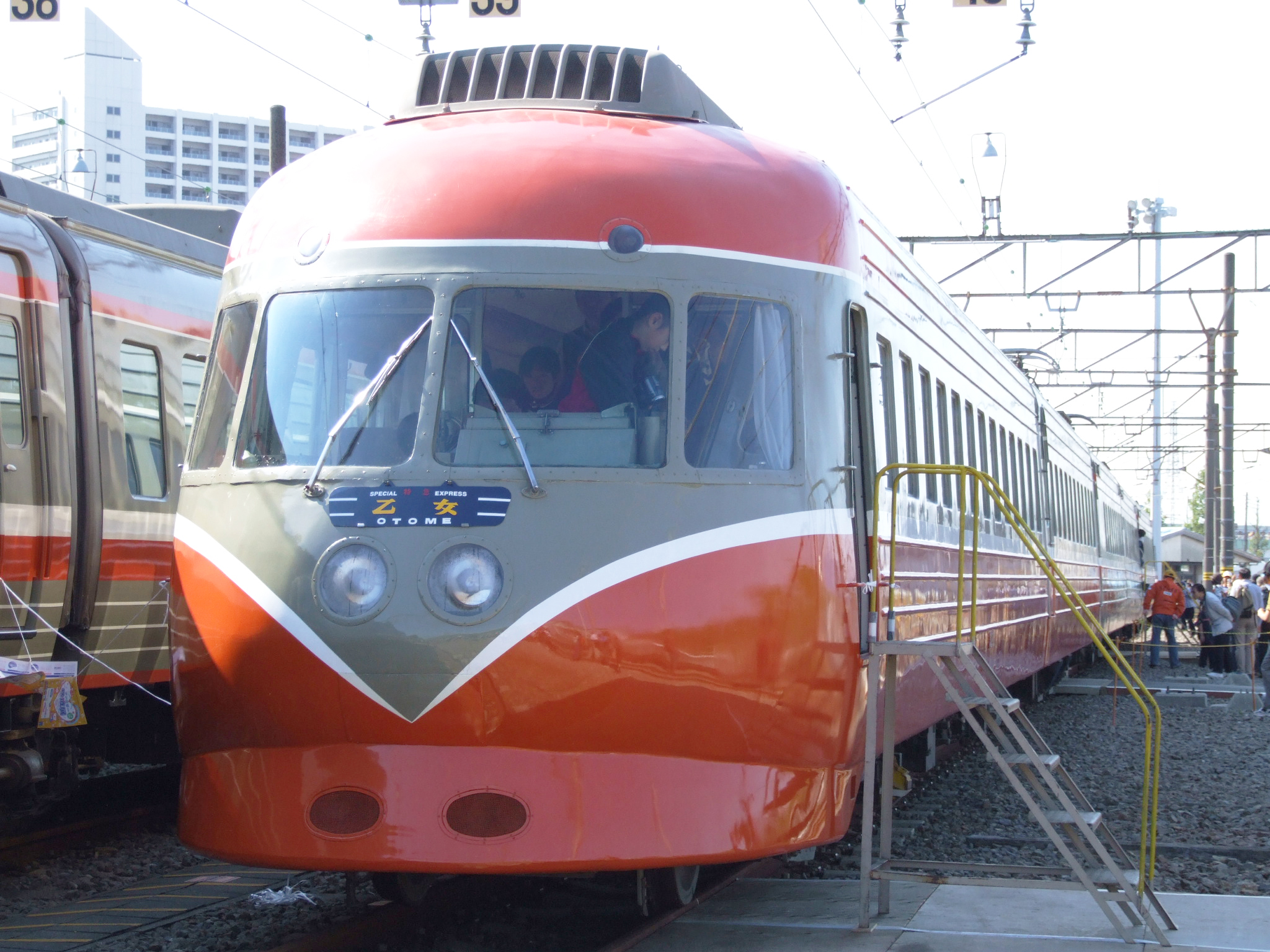
The first Romancecar, 1957 world-record-holding 3000 series SE

The Romancecar (Japanese: ロマンスカー, Hepburn: Romansukā) is Odakyu Electric Railway's brand name for its limited express services operating between Tokyo and tourist destinations southwest of the city, including the mountain resorts of Hakone and Gotemba (near Mount Fuji), as well as coastal destinations including Odawara and Enoshima. Introduced in 1957 with the 3000 series SE trainset, the service set a world speed record of 145 kilometres per hour (90 mph) for a narrow gauge railway. This achievement was influential to the design and creation of the country's high speed rail network, the Shinkansen.

== Name origin ==
The name comes from romance seats, two-person seats without separating armrests when one-person seats were a norm. Some Romancecars are equipped with standard seats featuring armrests. Other railroad companies also used "romance cars" or "romance seats" (a Japanese portmanteau for "loveseat") for their special accommodation passenger cars, but Odakyu holds the trademark for the term "Romancecar".

== Service ==
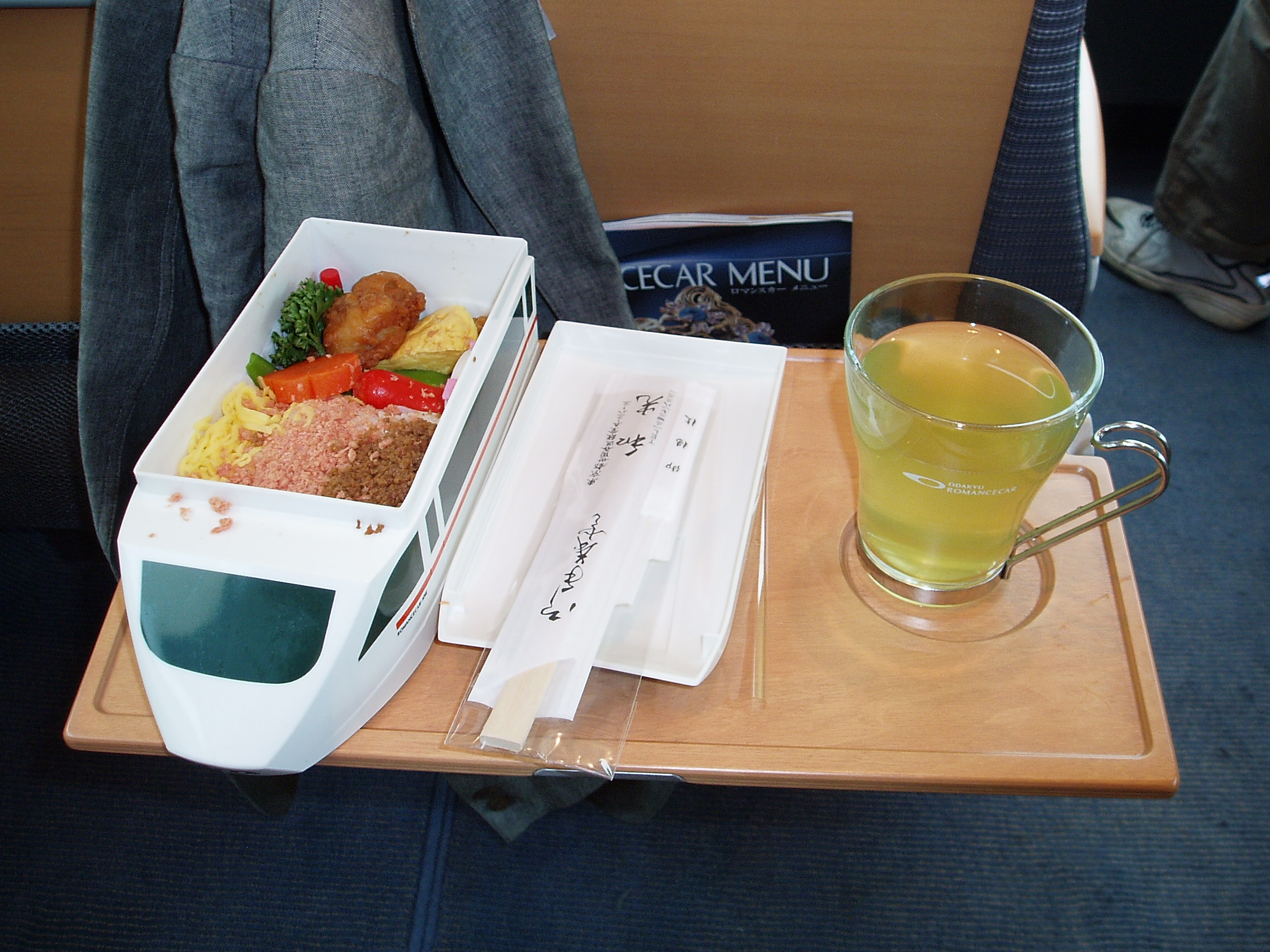
Bento meal on board a VSE train

Odakyu currently operates the following Romancecar services. All are classified as tokkyū (limited express) services, requiring a separate limited express supplement ticket in addition to the standard fare and seat reservations. Bento meals are available on board.

=== Leisure oriented services ===
- Enoshima – service between Katase-Enoshima and Shinjuku
  - Metro Enoshima – service between Katase-Enoshima and Kita-Senju via the Tokyo Metro Chiyoda Line
- Hakone – service between Hakone-Yumoto via the Hakone Tozan Line and Shinjuku
  - Metro Hakone – service between Hakone-Yumoto via the Hakone Tozan Line and Kita-Senju via the Tokyo Metro Chiyoda Line
  - Sagami – short-turn service between Shinjuku and Odawara
  - Super Hakone – weekends-only between Hakone-Yumoto and Shinjuku with no intermediate stops
- Mt. Fuji – service between Shinjuku and Gotemba via the JR Central Gotemba Line

=== Commute oriented services ===
- Morning Way – inbound trains from Odawara or Katase-Enoshima to Shinjuku until 9:30 a.m.
  - Metro Morning Way – inbound trains from Odawara or Katase-Enoshima to Kita-Senju via the Tokyo Metro Chiyoda Line
- Home Way – outbound trains from Shinjuku to Hakone-Yumoto or Katase-Enoshima after 6 p.m.
  - Metro Home Way – outbound trains from Kita-Senju on the Tokyo Metro Chiyoda Line to Hakone-Yumoto or Katase-Enoshima

== Trainset evolution ==
=== Current ===
- 30000 series EXE (Excellent Express) – Introduced in 1996, the EXE series operates the majority of Romancecar services. Most sets are equipped with onboard vending machines, and some include cabin attendants. The series features a boxy design and a metallic bronze livery. Ten trainsets were built, capable of being split into six- and four-car trainsets. The splits are used for combined Hakone and Enoshima services, with the train splitting or combining at Sagami-Ono: the six-car section is used for Hakone and the four-car section for Enoshima. When 10-car trains operate on Hakone services without splitting at Sagami-Ono, the train divides at Odawara, with only the six-car set continuing on the Hakone Tozan Line to Hakone-Yumoto. Beginning in JFY2016, the fleet underwent a refurbishment program; refurbished trainsets are branded EXEα (Excellent Express Alpha).
- 60000 series MSE (Multi Super Express) – Introduced in March 2008, the MSE was the first Romancecar series designed for through services onto the Tokyo Metro Chiyoda Line. Eight trainsets were built, capable of being split into six- and four-car sets. The series received a Blue Ribbon Award presented by the Japan Railfan Club.
- 70000 series GSE (Graceful Super Express) – The newest Romancecar model, the GSE features an elevated driver's compartment similar to the HiSE and VSE. Two seven-car trainsets were built, used exclusively on Hakone services. The series entered service in March 2018 and received a Blue Ribbon Award.
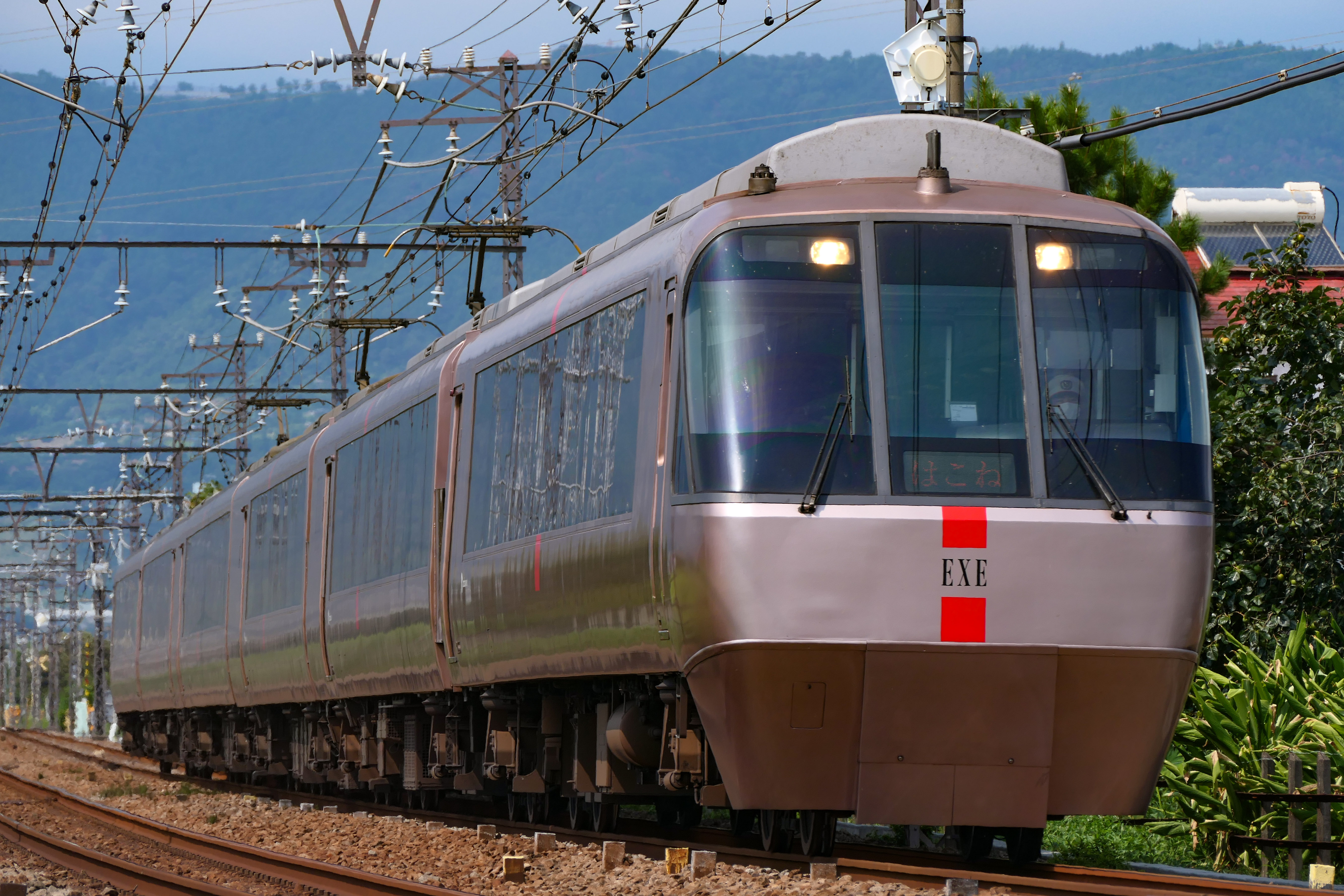
30000 series EXE

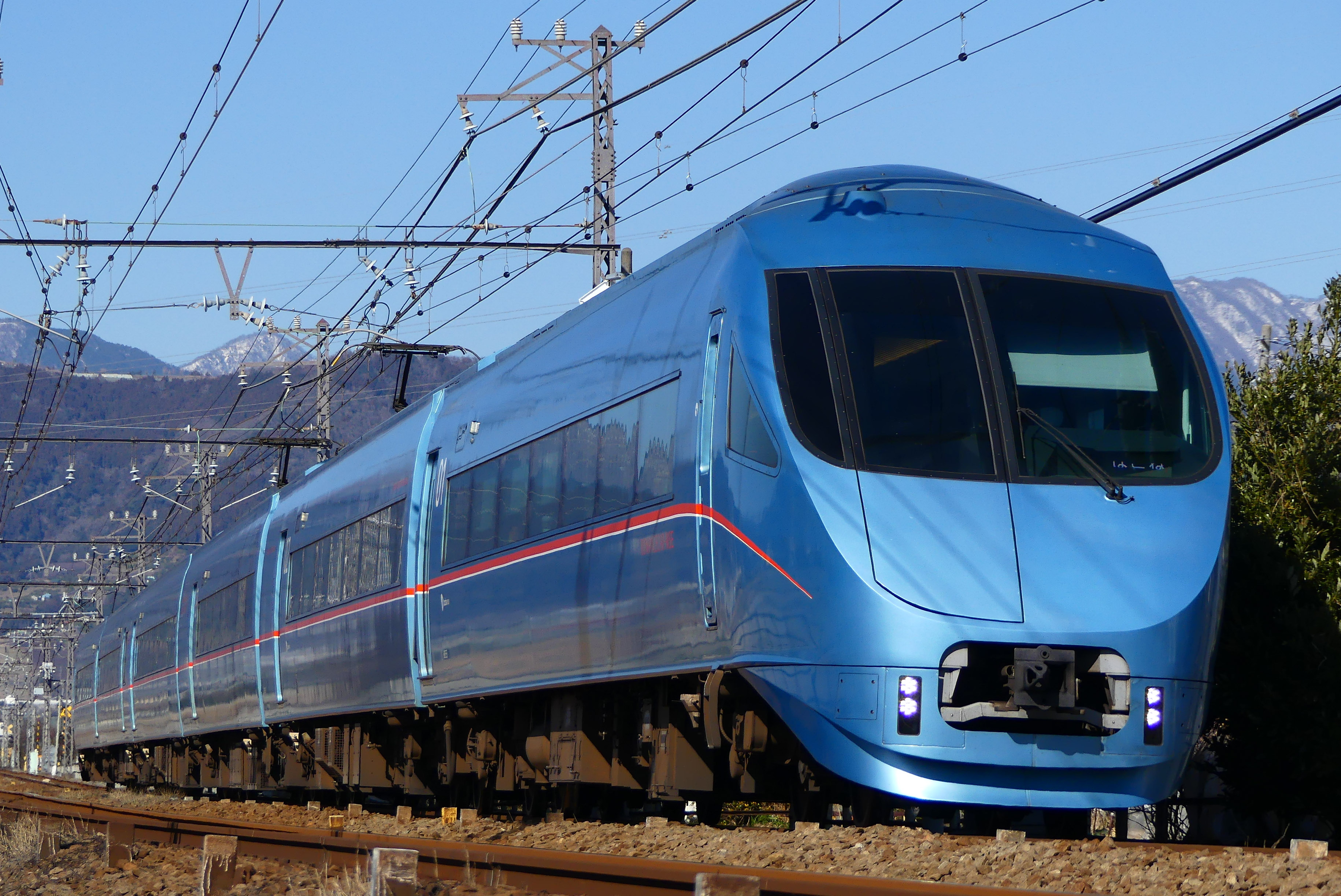
60000 series MSE

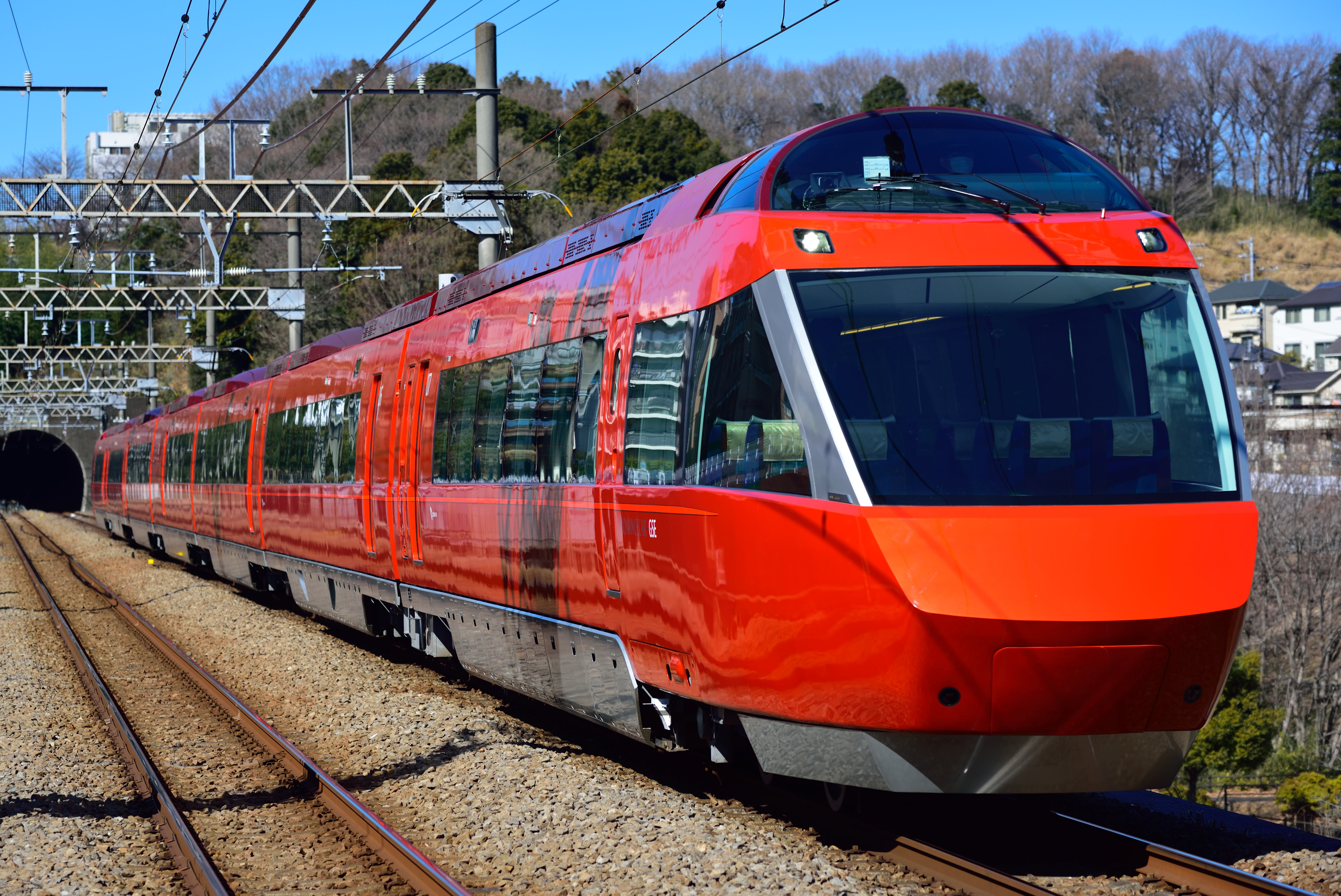
70000 series GSE

=== Historic ===
- 3000 series SE (Super Express): Introduced in 1957, these pioneering high-speed trainsets were used in regular service until 1968, with one set remaining in use until 1991. In September 1957, they set the world speed record for narrow-gauge railways at 145 km/h (90 mph), an achievement that influenced the development of the world’s first high-speed train, the Shinkansen. The eight-car trainsets seated 354 passengers. The series received the inaugural Blue Ribbon Award.
- 3100 series NSE (New Super Express): A taller, upgraded development of the 3000 series, the 3100 series entered service in 1963 and remained in operation until 1999. The biggest change was the driver's compartment was elevated above the passenger cabin to provide an unobstructed 180-degree forward view for passengers. With 11 cars, it was the longest Romancecar type in regular service, seating 464 passengers. It had a maximum design speed of 170 km/h (106 mph). The series received a Blue Ribbon Award.
- 7000 series LSE (Luxury Super Express): Introduced in 1980, the LSE featured a 180-degree panoramic front view. It seated 464 passengers in eleven cars, matching the capacity of the 3100 series, and was manufactured by Kawasaki Heavy Industries. The final two sets were withdrawn from regular service on July 10, 2018, and subsequently operated on a seasonal basis through the end of the fiscal year. The series received a Blue Ribbon Award.
- 10000 series HiSE (High-grade Super Express): Introduced in 1988, the HiSE was closely related to the 7000 series LSE and, for a time, represented the highest grade of Romancecar service, offering larger seats. As with the NSE, LSE and later VSE, the driver's compartment was elevated to provide an unobstructed 180-degree forward view for passengers. The series was primarily used on Hakone services, stopping more frequently than the VSE, with a journey time of approximately 90 minutes. Cabin attendants provided food and beverage service except on evening runs. The series received a Blue Ribbon Award. The final two sets were withdrawn on March 16, 2012.
- 20000 series RSE (Resort Super Express): Introduced in 1992 and withdrawn in 2012, the RSE trainsets were mainly used on Asagiri services to Gotemba, alternating with the similar JR Central 371 series. They were the only Odakyu trains to feature first-class seating in semi-compartments on the upper decks of two bi-level cars located near the center of each train. The RSE was also the first Romancecar series to depart from the traditional wine-red livery, instead using a light blue color scheme. The series received a Blue Ribbon Award.
- 50000 series VSE (Vault Super Express): Introduced in 2005, the white-liveried VSE featured an elevated driver's compartment similar to that of the HiSE. The series was primarily used on Super Hakone services and offered onboard attendants providing food, beverages, and retail service during the approximately 80-minute journey. Two cars included café spaces, contributing to the VSE’s nickname as a "moving café" (走る喫茶室). The trainsets seated 358 passengers. The series received a Blue Ribbon Award. The two sets were withdrawn from regular service on March 11, 2022, and fully retired on December 10, 2023.
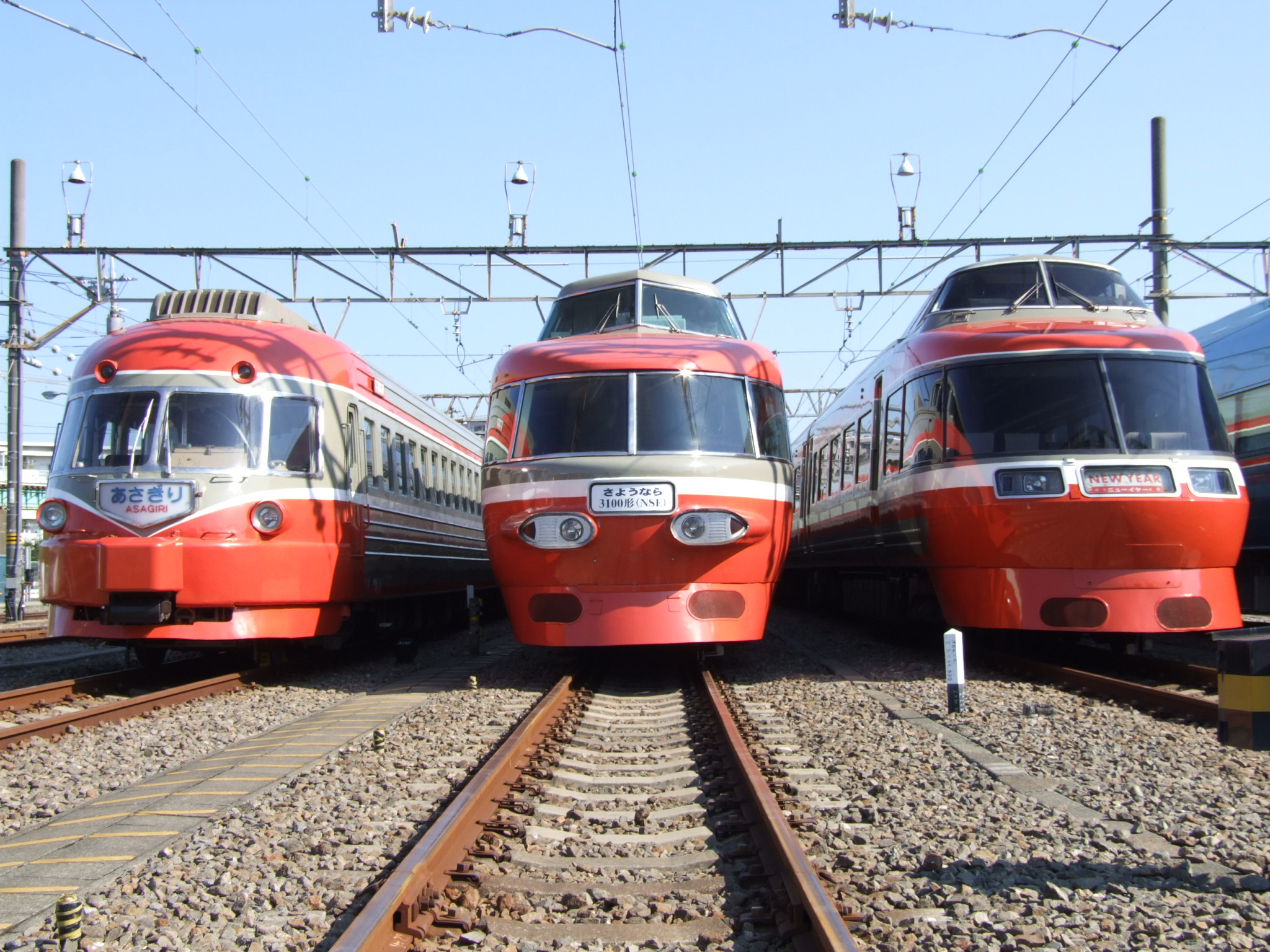
From left to right: 3000 SE, 3100 NSE and 7000 series LSE in traditional liveries

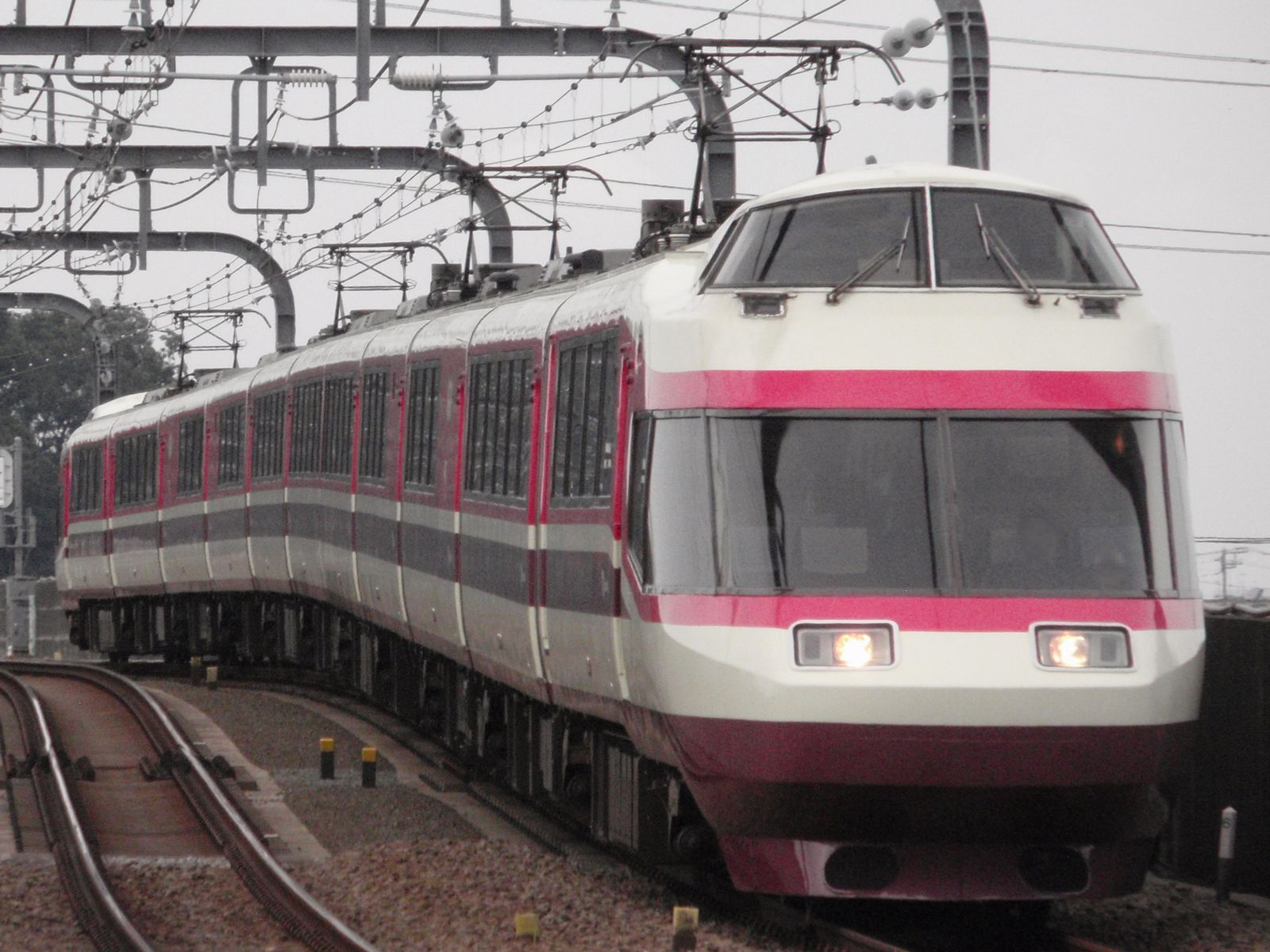
10000 series HiSE

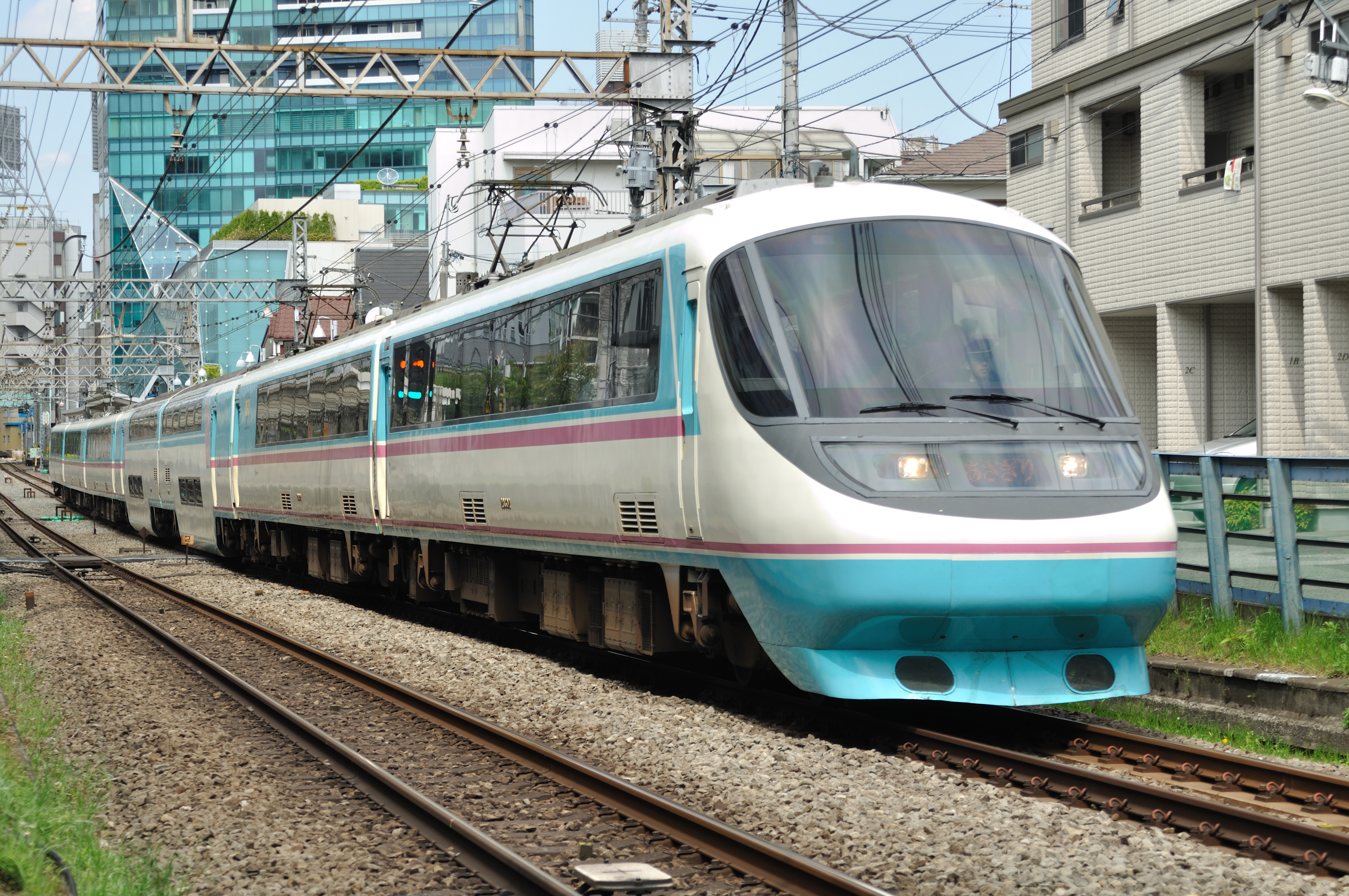
20000 series RSE

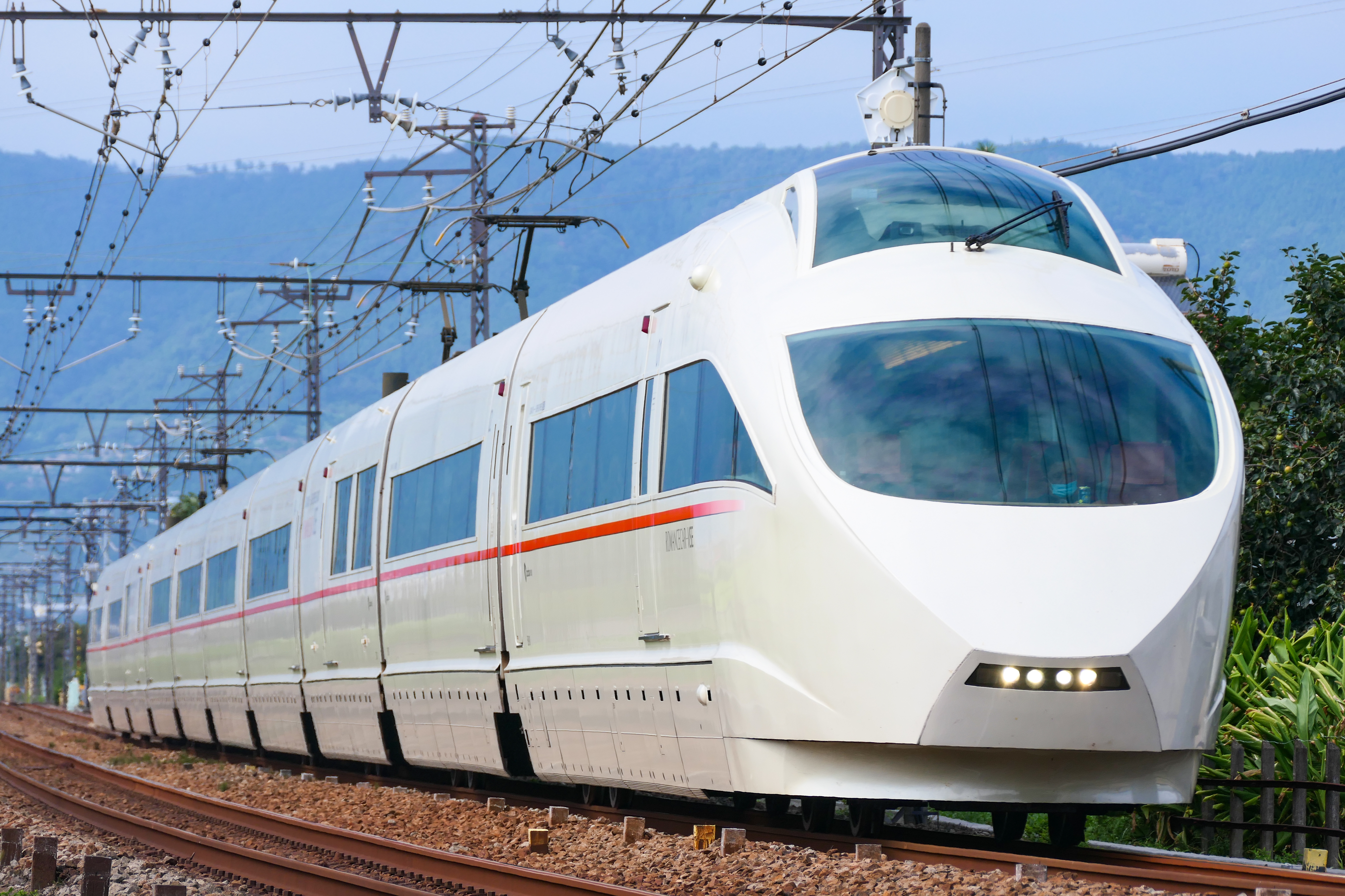
50000 series VSE
