= Odakyu 30000 series EXE =

Electric multiple unit train type operated by the Odakyu Electric Railway in Japan

Odakyu 30000 series Excellent Express
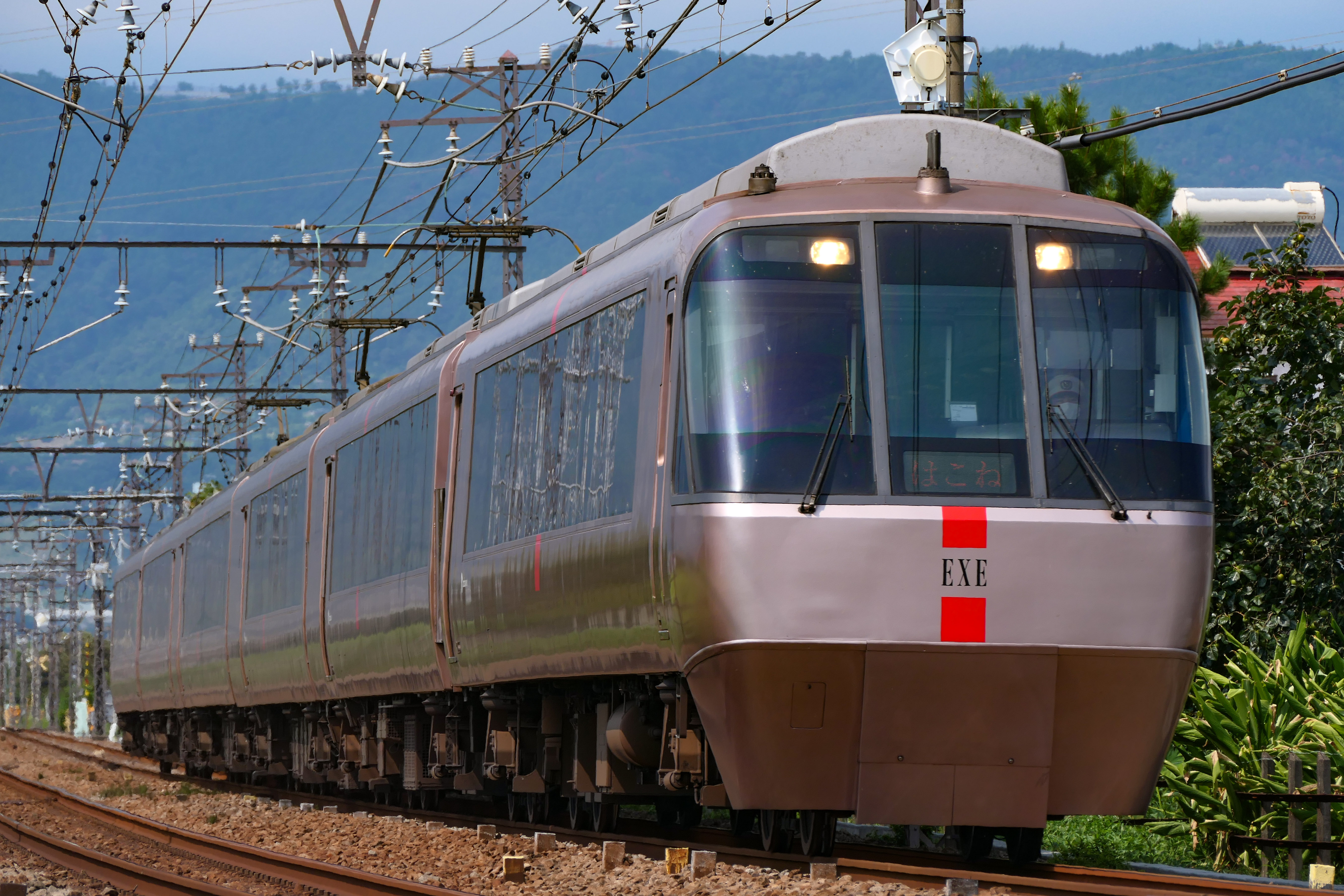
- Odakyu 30000 series EXE
- In service: 1996–present
- Manufacturer: Nippon Sharyo
- Family name: Romancecar
- Replaced: Odakyu 3100 series NSE
- Constructed: 1996–1999
- Entered service: 1996
- Refurbished: 2016–
- Number built: 70 vehicles (14 sets)
- Number in service: 70 vehicles (14 sets)
- Formation: 6+4 car sets
- Operator: Odakyu
- Lines served: Odakyu Odawara Line; Odakyu Enoshima Line

Specifications
- Car length: 20,000 mm (65 ft 7 in)
- Width: 2,900 mm (9 ft 6 in)
- Floor height: 1,180 mm (3 ft 10 in)
- Maximum speed: 110 km/h (68 mph)
- Traction system: Variable frequency (IGBT, SiC-MOSFET (refurbished))
- Electric system: 1,500 V DC
- Current collection: Overhead lines
- Braking system: Regenerative brake
- Safety system: D-ATS-P (OM)
- Track gauge: 1,067 mm (3 ft 6 in)

The Odakyu 30000 series (小田急30000形, Odakyū 30000-gata), branded "EXE/EXEα" ("Excellent Express/Excellent Express Alpha"), is an electric multiple unit (EMU) train type operated by the private railway operator Odakyu Electric Railway in Japan on Odakyu Odawara Line and Odakyu Enoshima Line "Romancecar" services since 1996.

== Design ==
Seven 4+6-car trainsets (70 vehicles) were built between 1996 and 1999 to replace ageing Odakyu 3100 series NSE trains. Unlike earlier Romancecar trainsets, which used articulated carriages, the 30000 series sets have 20 m (65 ft 7 in) long bogie cars. The inner driving cabs of the 4+6-car formations have gangway doors.

The passenger doors use 800 mm (31 in) wide sliding doors, with 1,000 mm (39 in) wide doors on cars 2, 5, and 8 to provide wheelchair accessibility.

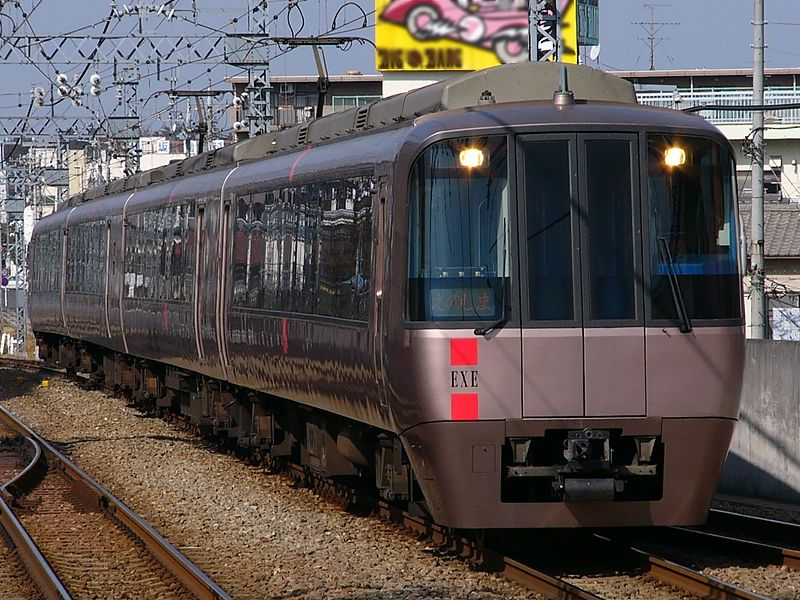
A 30000 series half-set with a gangwayed driving car leading in February 2004

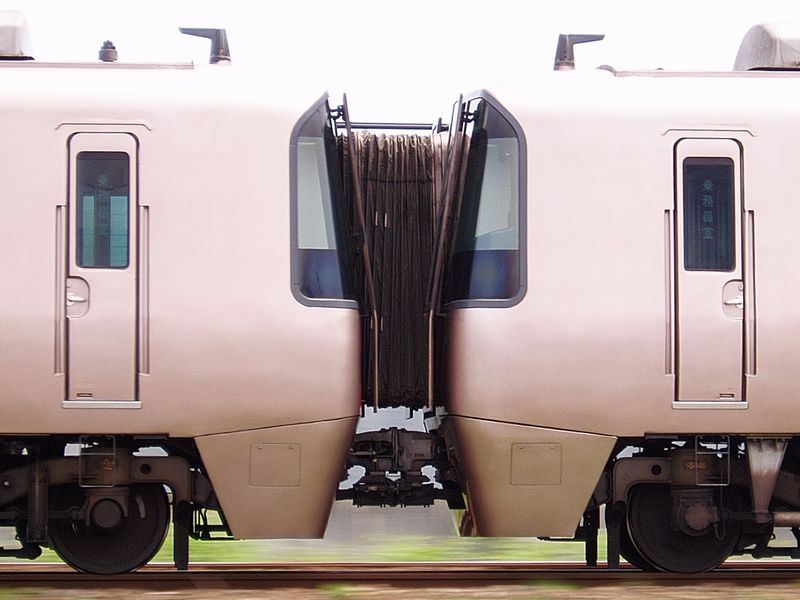
The gangwayed intermediate driving cars (cars 6 and 7)

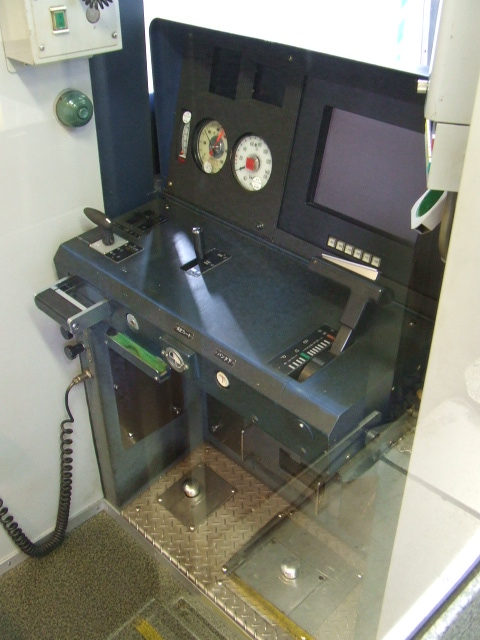
The interior of a gangwayed driver's cab

== Operations ==
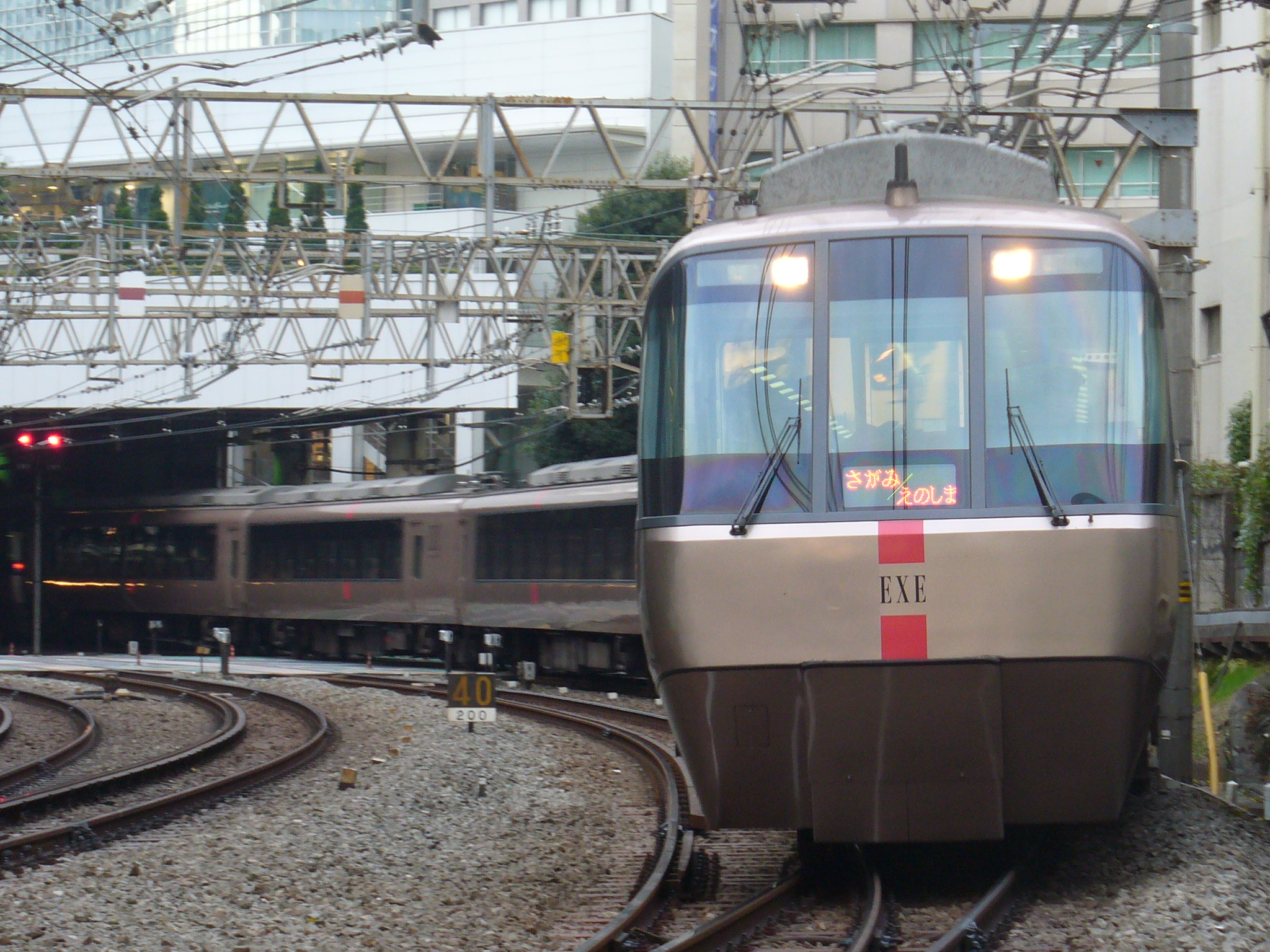
A 30000 series EXE set on a combined Sagami + Enoshima service in December 2007

The 30000 series trains are used on Odakyu Odawara Line Hakone services between Shinjuku in Tokyo and Hakone-Yumoto Station in Kanagawa Prefecture (about 88 km (55 mi)), as well as Sagami and Homeway services. They are also on Odakyu Enoshima Line Enoshima services between Shinjuku and Katase-Enoshima.

Trainsets were introduced on combined Hakone and Enoshima services, with trains dividing at Machida, and later at Sagami-Ono. 10-car Hakone services to Hakone-Yumoto also divide at Odawara with just the 6-car sets continuing onward to Hakone-Yumoto.

== Formations ==
As of 1 April 2016, the fleet consists of seven 4+6-car trainsets, formed as follows, with car 1 at the western end. All seven sets are based at Ebina Depot.

=== Unrefurbished sets ===
Car No.	1	2	3	4	5	6	7	8	9	10
Designation	Tc2	M2'	T2	T1	M1'	Tc1'	Tc2'	M2	M1	Tc1
Numbering	3055x	3050x	3045x	3035x	3020x	3025x	3015x	3010x	3000x	3005x

Cars 2, 3, 5, 8, and 9 are each fitted with a single-arm pantograph. Only one bogie on car 9 is motored.

=== Refurbished sets ===
Refurbished trainsets are formed as follows, with five motored cars per ten-car formation.

Car No.	1	2	3	4	5	6	7	8	9	10
Designation	Tc2	M3	M2'N	T1	M1'	Tc1'	Tc2'	M2	M1	Tc1
Numbering	3055x	3050x	3040x	3035x	3020x	3025x	3015x	3010x	3000x	3005x
Weight (t)	33.45	42.32	41.60	35.99	40.50	35.36	37.02	42.45	41.44	33.56
Capacity	56	58	56	68	54	60	58	58	54	56

Cars 2, 3, 5, 8, and 9 are each fitted with a PT7113-A single-arm pantograph.

== Interior ==
Passenger accommodation consists of monoclass unidirectional 2+2 abreast seating, with 460 mm (18 in) wide seats and a seating pitch of 1,000 mm (39 in). The first eight half-sets delivered had green-coloured seats in the six-cars sets (evoking the forests of Hakone) and blue-coloured seats in the four-car sets (evoking the sea of Enoshima), but from 1999 onward, the seats in all sets was standardized with grey and brown seat covers. Wheelchair spaces are located in cars 5 and 8.

Refreshment counters are provided in cars 3 and 9. Toilets are provided in cars 2, 5, and 8, and the toilet in car 5 is a universal access type.

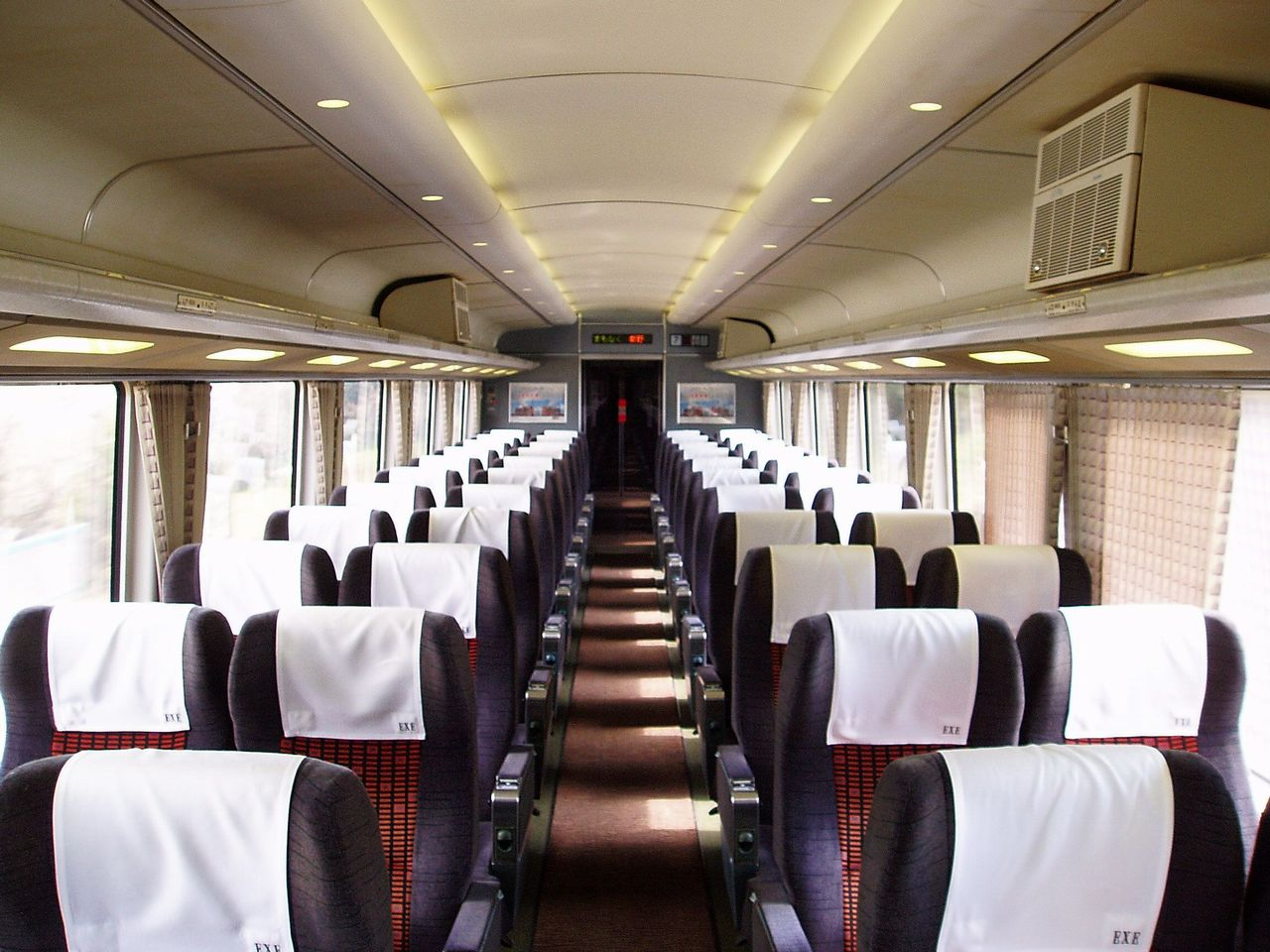
The passenger saloon interior in March 2007

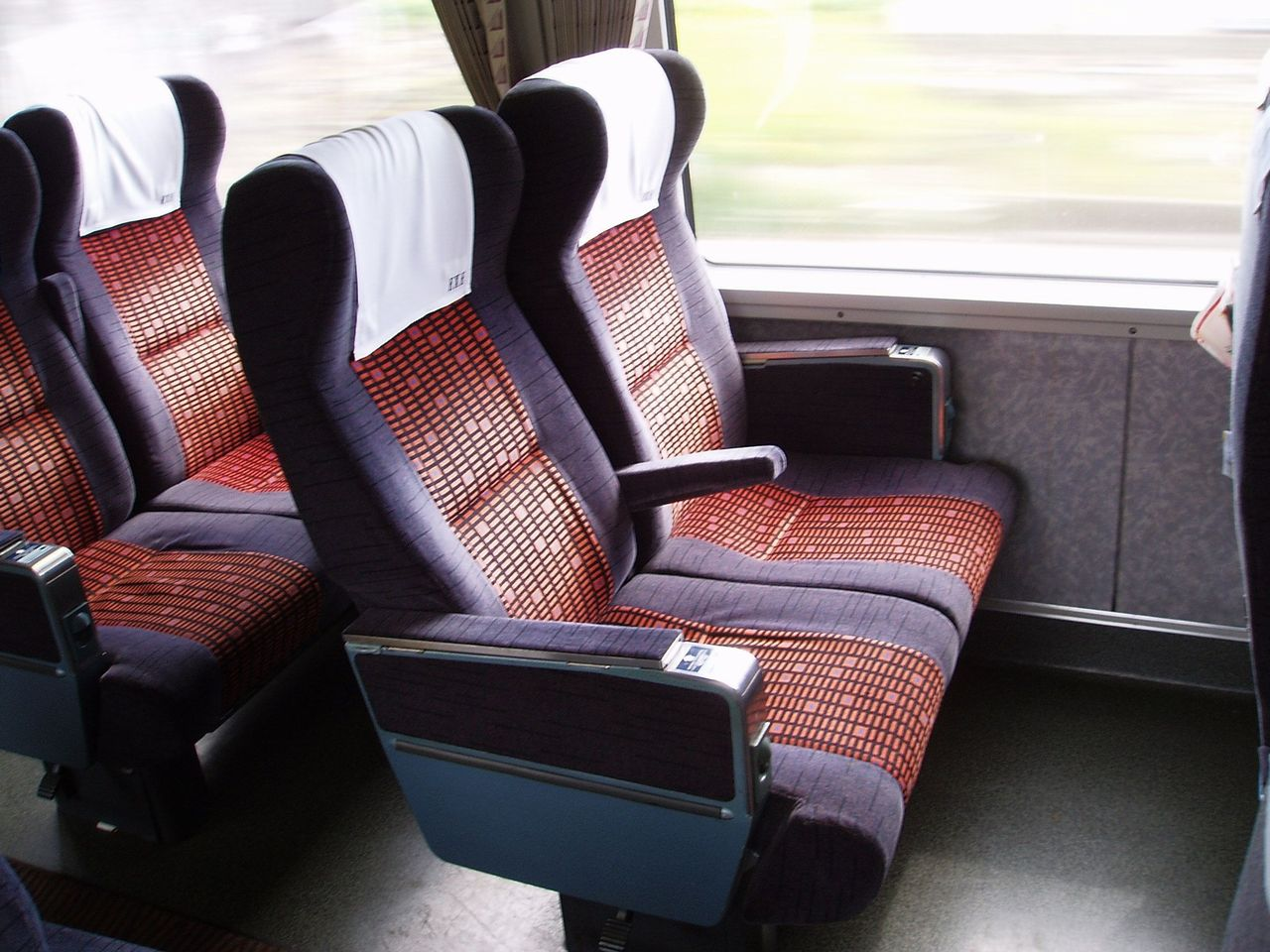
Seating in March 2007

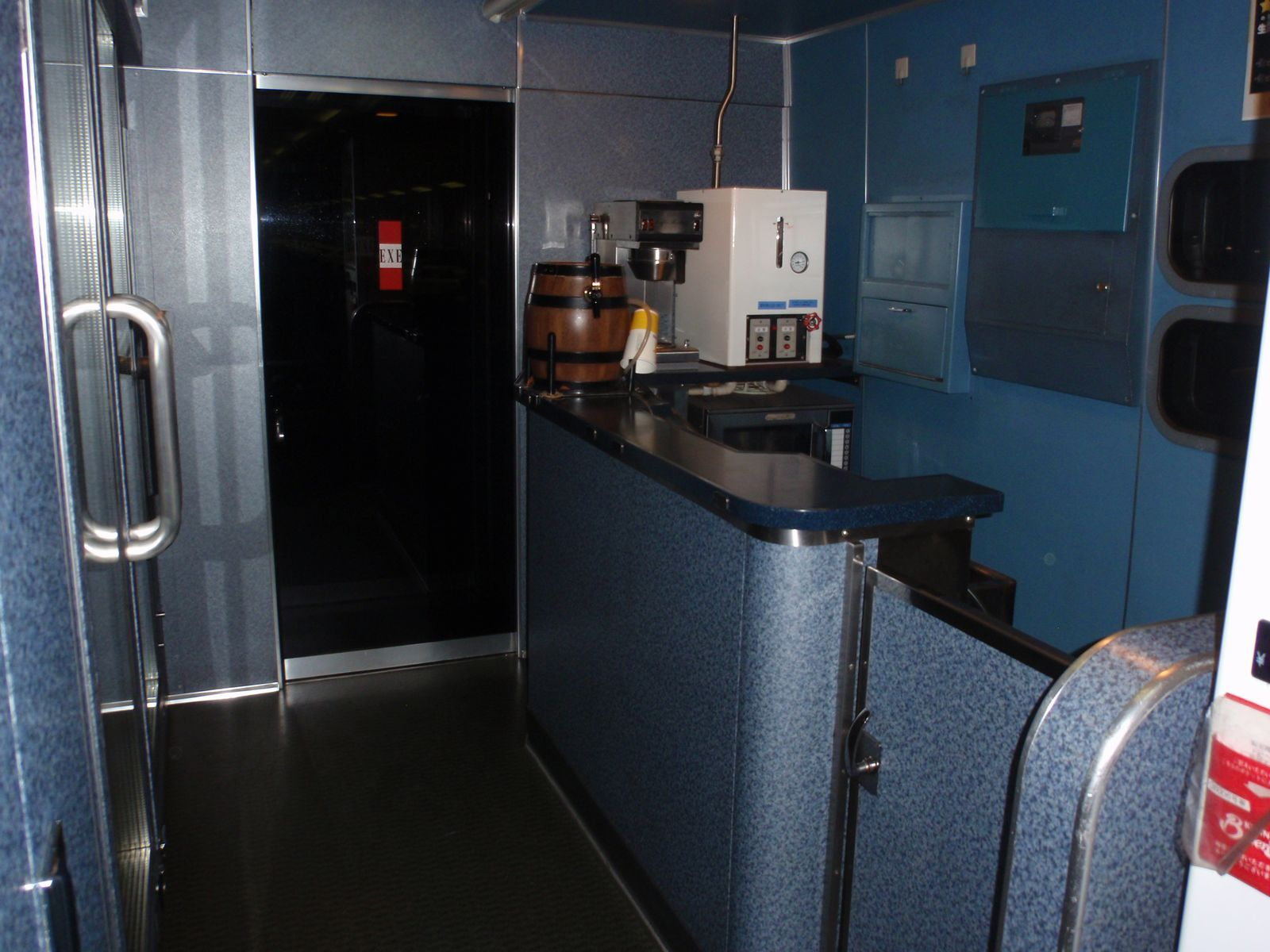
A refreshment counter in November 2011

== History ==
The first trains entered revenue service on 23 March 1996.

=== Build history ===
The fleet was built between 1996 and 1999 in three batches as follows.

Batch	Sets	Build date
1st	1-2	January - February 1996
2nd	3-4	April - May 1997
3rd	5-7	April - June 1999

=== Refurbishment ===
The fleet underwent a programme of refurbishment from fiscal 2016, with the first 4+6-car trainset treated returning to service in March 2017, rebranded "EXEα".

Refurbishment was carried out by Nippon Sharyo, with the design overseen by Noriaki Okabe Architecture Network. It includes the following changes:

- Redesigned interiors and seating
- Replacement of Japanese-style squat toilets with Western-style toilets (Toto "Washlet" type)
- Additional luggage racks
- LED lighting in passenger saloons
- Installation of security cameras in vestibule and passenger saloons
- Fully enclosed traction motors
- Conversion of one former trailer car (car 3) to a motored car, and the addition of a second motored bogie to car 9, which previously only had one motored bogie.

The first train set to be refurbished, four-car set 30051, was returned to Odakyu from the Nippon Sharyo factory in Toyokawa, Aichi, in November 2016.

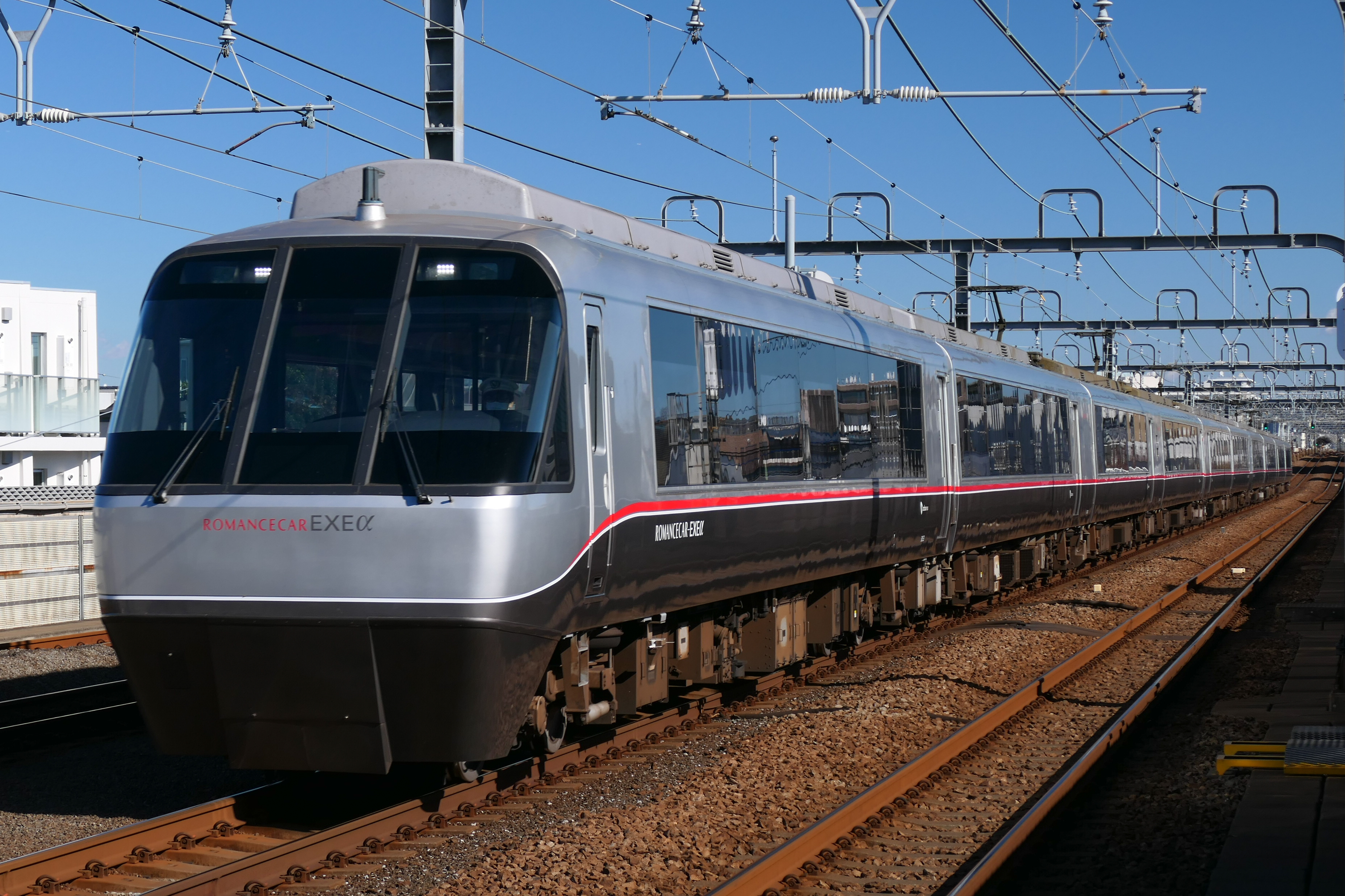
A refurbished "EXEα" set in November 2021

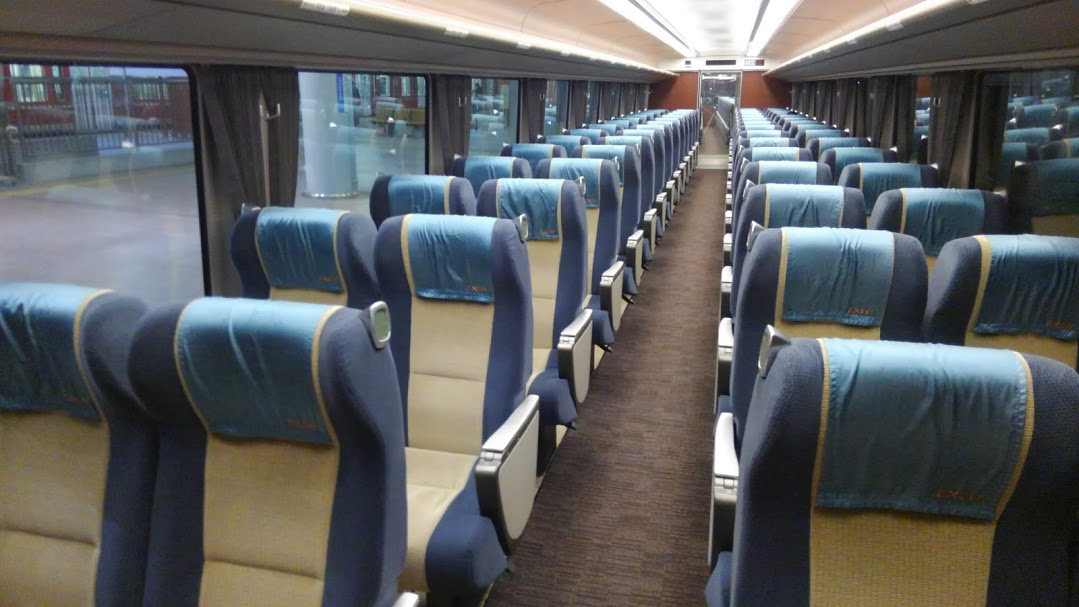
The updated passenger saloon interior in April 2019

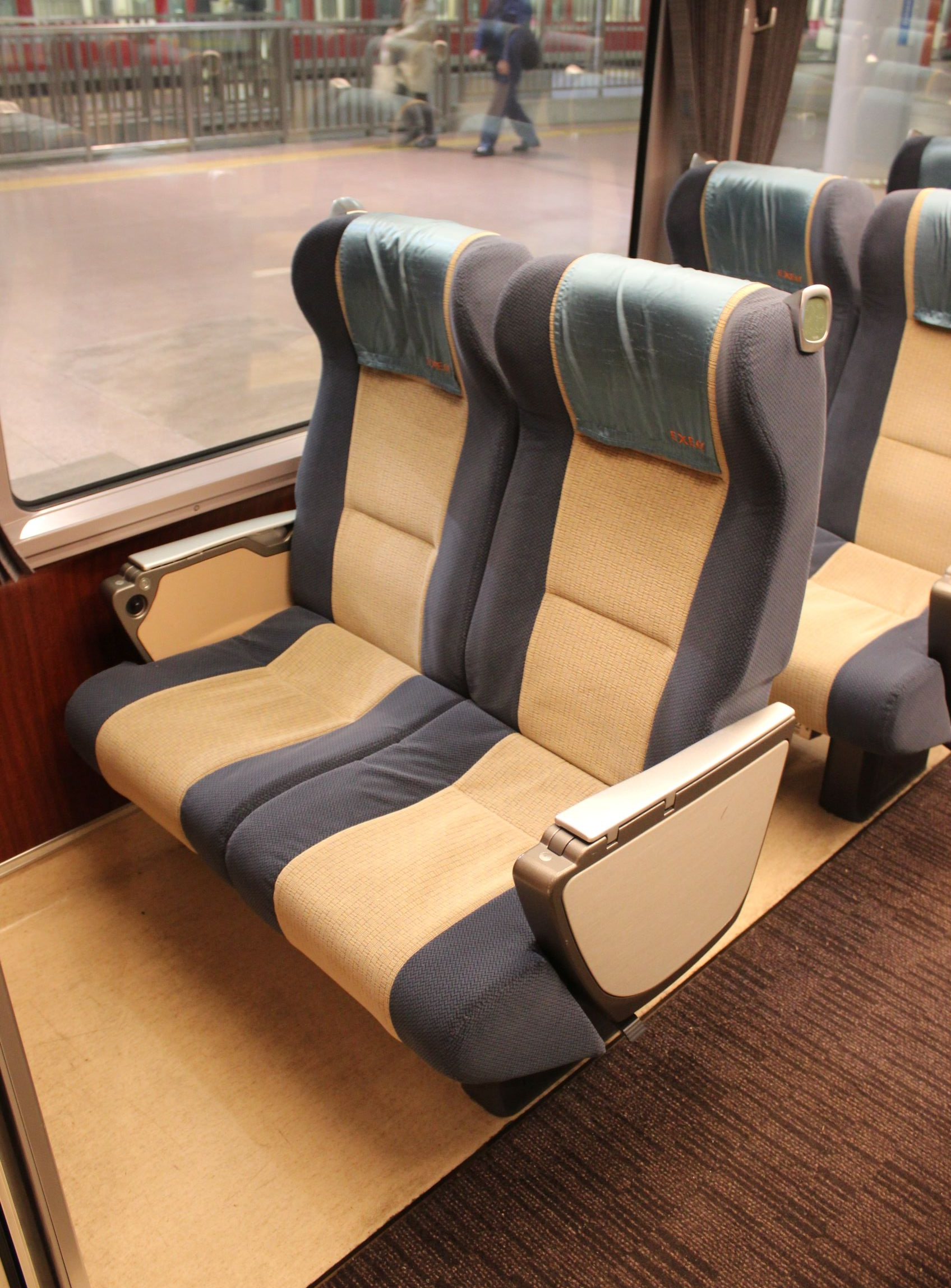
Updated seating in April 2019

== Future ==
On 9 September 2024, Odakyu Electric Railway announced that development had started on a new Romancecar train type, positioned as a replacement for non-refurbished 30000 series sets and a spiritual successor to the 50000 series VSE. The new Romancecar type, classified 80000 series, is scheduled to enter revenue service in March 2029.

== In popular culture ==
The Odakyu 30000 series EXE is featured as a non-driveable train in the Microsoft Train Simulator computer game.
