= Odakyu 3100 series NSE =

Electric multiple unit of Odakyu Electric Railway

Odakyu 3100 series New Super Express
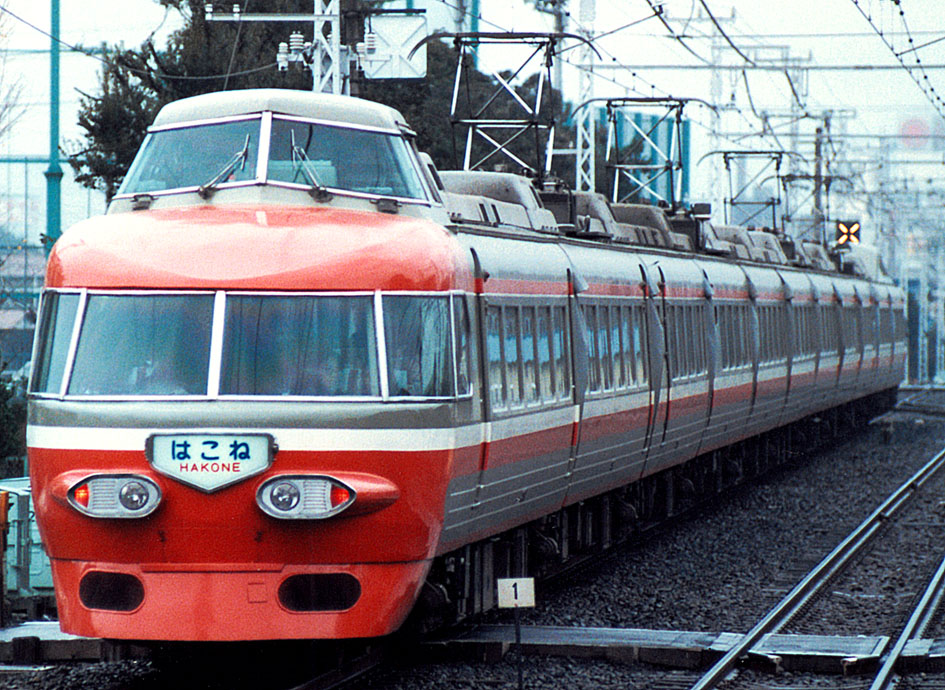
- Odakyu 3100 series NSE set on a Hakone service, 1987
- In service: March 1963–April 2000
- Manufacturers: Nippon Sharyo, Kawasaki Heavy Industries
- Family name: Romancecar
- Constructed: 1962–1963, 1966–1967
- Refurbished: 1977–1987
- Scrapped: 1996–2000, 2017
- Number built: 77 cars (7 sets)
- Number preserved: 4 cars
- Number scrapped: 73 cars
- Successor: Odakyu 30000 series EXE
- Formation: 11 cars per set
- Fleet numbers: 3101–3231
- Capacity: 464 passengers (as built); 456 passengers (as refurbished)
- Operator: Odakyu Electric Railway
- Line served: Odakyu Odawara Line

Specifications
- Train length: 144.47 m (474.0 ft)
- Car length: 16,465 mm (54 ft 0 in) (lead cars); 12,400 mm (40 ft 8 in) (intermediate cars)
- Width: 2,900 mm (9 ft 6 in)
- Height: 4,000 mm (13 ft 1 in) (lead car)
- Doors: 2 per side (lead cars); 1 per side (intermediate cars)
- Maximum speed: 110 km/h (68 mph)
- Traction system: Electric camshaft (resistor control)
- Power output: 110 kW (150 hp) series motor
- Acceleration: 1.5 km/(h⋅s) (0.93 mph/s)
- Deceleration: 3.7 km/(h⋅s) (2.3 mph/s)
- Electric system: 1,500 V DC
- Current collection: Overhead lines
- Safety system: OM-ATS
- Track gauge: 1,067 mm (3 ft 6 in)

Notes/references
- This train won the 7th Blue Ribbon Award in 1964.

The Odakyu 3100 series (小田急3100形, Odakyū 3100-gata) or NSE (New Super Express) was an articulated electric multiple unit (EMU) train type operated by the Odakyu Electric Railway on Romancecar services in the Tokyo area of Japan between 1963 and 2000.

It won the Blue Ribbon Award in 1964.

== Operations ==
The 3100 series sets were used on Hakone, Ashigara, and Sagami services.

== History ==
Introduced in 1957, the Odakyu 3000 series SE Romancecar and associated Hakone limited express service proved to be very popular, and there were capacity shortages on weekends even with all trainsets in use. In 1960, shortages were exacerbated by increased tourism to Hakone after the Hakone Ropeway was completed. Odakyu introduced semi-express trains to the Odawara Line in 1959 using 2300 series and 2320 series trainsets to meet demand, but there were calls within the company to increase the number of limited express trains. Ahead of the 1964 Tokyo Olympics, different plans to increase the capacity of Romancecars were considered, which included building new 3000 series sets, lengthening existing ones, or manufacturing a new vehicle. Odakyu chose the latter, based on the idea that "the limited express vehicle is the icon of the company and must give passengers dreams with its novelty and splendor."

Designs for multiple articulated trainsets connected together were considered, but ultimately, a unified, articulated, 11-car trainset design was settled on. The sets were limited to 11 cars due to concerns about axle loads, and to match the 140-meter (460 ft) length of 8-car express trains that the Odawara Line was being upgraded to handle (Odakyu commuter train cars were 17.5 meters long at the time).

While the 3000 series was a leap in technical performance compared when it was introduced, it was viewed as "somewhat poor" by the Odakyu sales department. This was in part due to the 3000 series' focus on weight reduction, whereas new limited express trains by other railway operators emphasized novelty and luxury. The 3100 series would keep the technical advancements of the 3000 series, namely the articulated bogies and low center of gravity, and focused its design around six slogans: Safety, Economy, Deluxe, Attractive, Comfortable, and Speed.

Two trainsets were tested between January and February 1963. On March 14, a 3100 series recorded a speed of 130 km/h during a test run, the highest speed recorded on an Odakyu line at the time. Commercial operations began on March 16. Two more trainsets were later introduced, making for a total of four SE trainsets and four NSE trainsets. The additional trainsets enabled Odakyu to introduce a schedule update in November, which adopted a 30-minute headway for Hakone services and cut trip times between Shinjuku and Odawara down to 62 minutes. Three additional trainsets were introduced between 1966 and March 1967, enabling Hakone services to be run exclusively by NSE trainsets, except during train car inspections. Odakyu chose to order seven trainsets in total under the presumption that a single trainset could make a round trip, including turnaround time, in 180 minutes, and that six trains offering service at 30-minute intervals would be sufficient. However, commuter demand would continue to increase beyond what Odakyu forecasted, necessitating large scale construction at Shinjuku and a slowdown of limited express trains, increasing travel times between Shinjuku and Odawara to 69 minutes at fastest by 1972 after two schedule revisions. No new Romancecar trainsets would be introduced until the 7000 series LSE in 1980. OM-ATS equipment was added in 1968.

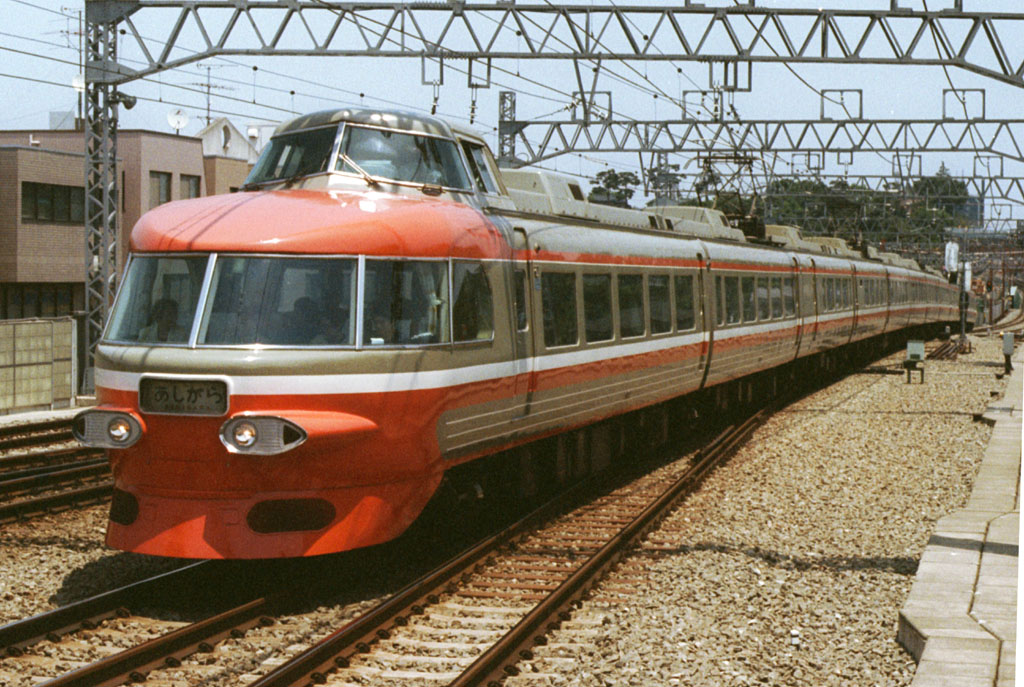
Post-refurbishment 3100 series train in 1999

The trainsets would receive various refurbishments and updates between 1977 and 1987. Between 1977 and 1978, additional air conditioning equipment was added on the roofs of cars due to space limitations under the train. The train interior would receive refurbishments between 1977 and 1980. Electric locks would be added to train doors between 1978 and 1983 to prevent doors from opening while the train was running. Following the introduction of the 7000 series LSE, the 3100 series sets received a larger scale repair and refurbishment between 1984 and 1987 by Nippon Sharyo. This included a new lighting arrangement, double glazed passenger windows, and a change of the front service sign from an acrylic plate to an electronic rollsign. The capacity of the trainset was slightly lowered, with the capacity of cars 3 and 9 being reduced from 36 passengers to 32 in order to accommodate an expanded shop area.

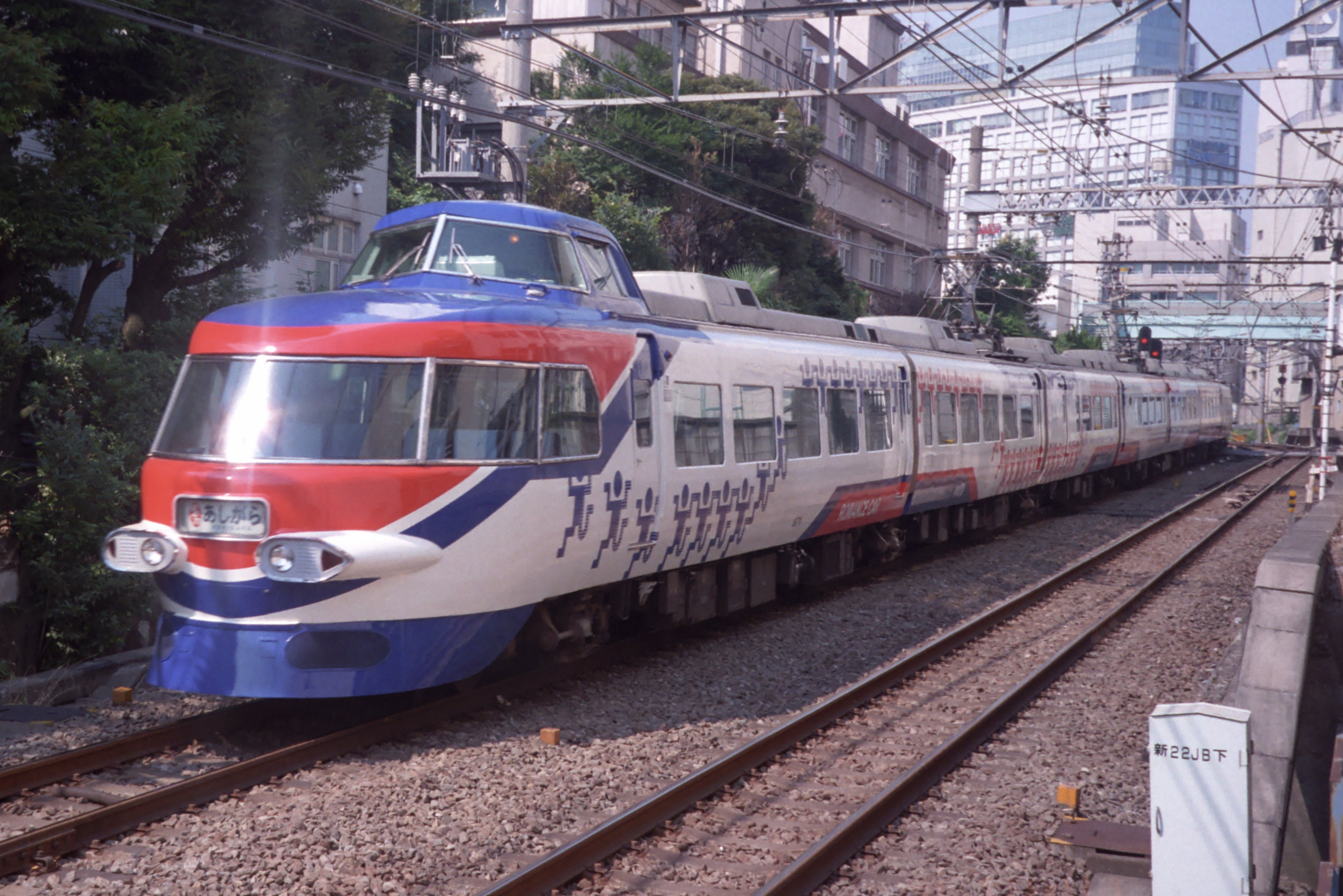
3100 series train in "Yume 70" livery in 1998

The series would begin to be phased out in 1996 with the introduction of 30000 series EXE sets. In 1997, 3100 series set 3161 was turned into a special event limited express "Yume 70" and given a special livery in celebration of the 70th anniversary of operations on the Odawara Line. Ahead of the July 1999 schedule revision, it was decided that the 3100 series would be discontinued and scrapped. Prior to their withdrawal, Odakyu commemorated the retirement with 3,100 limited edition wristwatches and 3,100 limited edition Plarail units. An invitation-only farewell trip was held between Sagami-Ono and Karakida Station on July 11. Regular Romancecar service concluded on July 16, 1999, with a ceremony at Hakone-Yumoto, the first and only time a 3100 series trainset would depart from the station. The mayor of Hakone gave a letter of appreciation at this ceremony. After this, all 3100 series sets aside from the "Yume 70" set were taken out of service. "Yume 70" would continue to be used as a charter train until its farewell run on April 23, 2000.

== Interior ==
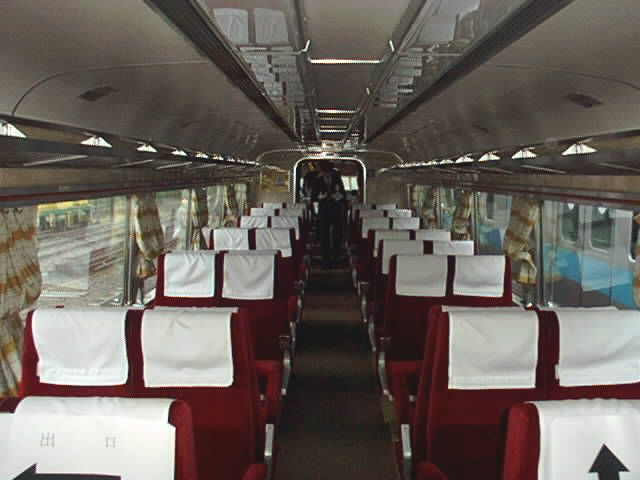
Interior view, 2001

== Preserved examples ==
Initially, seven 3100 series cars were preserved. Six cars from the 7th trainset (lead car 3221) were held in Kitami inspection yard. In October 2017, due to increased train storage requirements ahead of the completion of a quadruple tracking project on the Odawara Line, three intermediate cars from the set were to be dismantled. The remaining three cars, two lead cars and one intermediate car, were relocated to the Romancecar Museum in Ebina, which opened on April 19, 2021.

Lead car 3181, part of the 5th set, is preserved in a park near Kaisei Station.

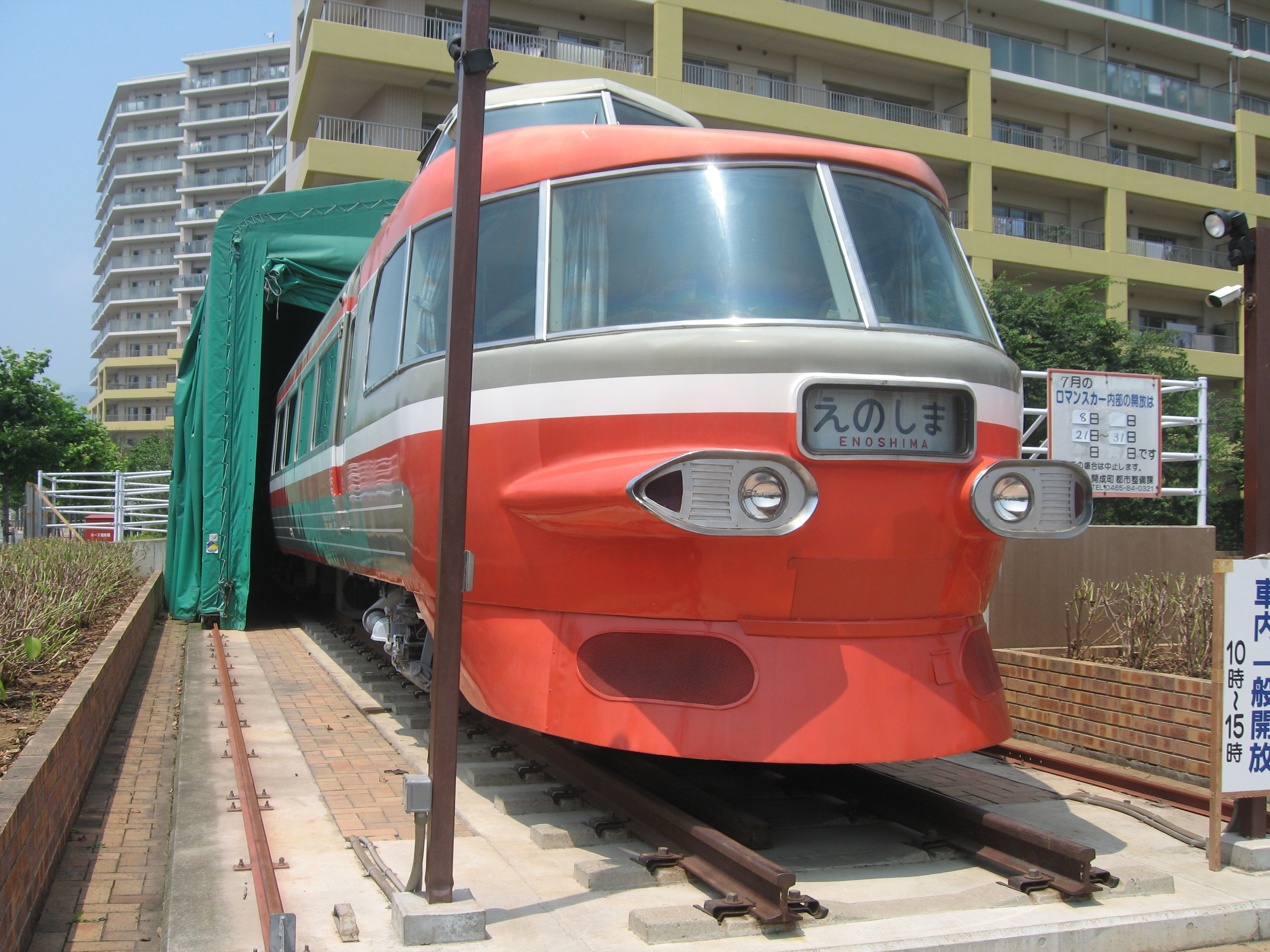
Preserved 3100 series car near Kaisei Station, September 2007

== In media ==
The 3100 Series is used as the basis for the Train in the Vary Dimension in the series finale of the 1966 TV series Ultra Q.

== Sources ==
=== Books ===
- Ubukata, Yoshio [in Japanese]; Morokawa, Hisashi [in Japanese] (1981). 日本の私鉄5 小田急 [Private Railways in Japan #5: Odakyu] (in Japanese). Hoikusha Publishers. ISBN 4586505303.
- Ubukata, Yoshio; Morokawa, Hisashi (1988). 日本の私鉄1 小田急 [Private Railways in Japan #1: Odakyu]. Hoikusha Publishers. ISBN 4586507683.
- Ubukata, Yoshio (2005). 小田急ロマンスカー総覧 [Odakyu Romancecar Overview] (in Japanese). Taisho Publishing. ISBN 4811706552.
- Yoshikawa, Fumio [in Japanese] (1987). 小田急 車両と駅の60年 [60 Years of Odakyu Stations]. 0025-301310-4487.
- Koyama, Ikuo; Morokawa, Hisashi (1985). 私鉄の車両2 小田急 [Private Railways in Japan #2: Odakyu]. Hoikusha Publishers. ISBN 4586532025.

=== Magazine articles ===
- Ohata, Satomi (1988). "小田急ロマンスカー3000,3100,7000系 車両のあゆみ" [History of Odakyu Romancecar 3000, 3100, 7000 Series]. The Railway Pictorial (鉄道ピクトリアル) (in Japanese). No. 491. pp. 16–24.
- Ohata, Satomi (1991). "私鉄車両めぐり145 小田急電鉄" [Private Railway Vehicle Tour #145: Odakyu Electric Railway]. The Railway Pictorial (in Japanese). No. 546. pp. 175–197.
- Ohata, Satomi (1999). "私鉄車両めぐり164 小田急電鉄" [Private Railway Vehicle Tour #164: Odakyu Electric Railway]. The Railway Pictorial (in Japanese). No. 679. pp. 201–243.
- Yamashita, Kazuyuki (January 2010). "1960-80年代の小田急回想" [Recollection of Odakyu in the 1960s-80s]. The Railway Pictorial (in Japanese). No. 829.
- Kishigami, Akihiko (January 2010). "小田急電鉄現有車両プロフィール" [Odakyu Electric Railway Current Rolling Stock Profile]. The Railway Pictorial (in Japanese). No. 829. pp. 241–295.
- Ubukata, Yoshio (September 2002) [1959]. "私鉄車両めぐり37 小田急電鉄" [Private Railway Vehicle Tour #37: Odakyu Electric Railway]. The Railway Pictorial Archives Selection (鉄道ピクトリアル アーカイブスセレクション) (in Japanese). No. 1. pp. 42–71.
- Yamagishi, Yojiro (September 2002a). "新特急車3100形の解説" [Commentary on the new limited express car 3100]. The Railway Pictorial Archives Selection (in Japanese). No. 1. pp. 84–89.
- Yamagishi, Yojiro (December 2002b). "小田急電車 進歩のあと" [After Odakyu Train progress]. The Railway Pictorial Archives Selection (in Japanese). No. 2. pp. 46–58.
