= Odakyu 10000 series HiSE =

Electric multiple unit of Odakyu Electric Railway

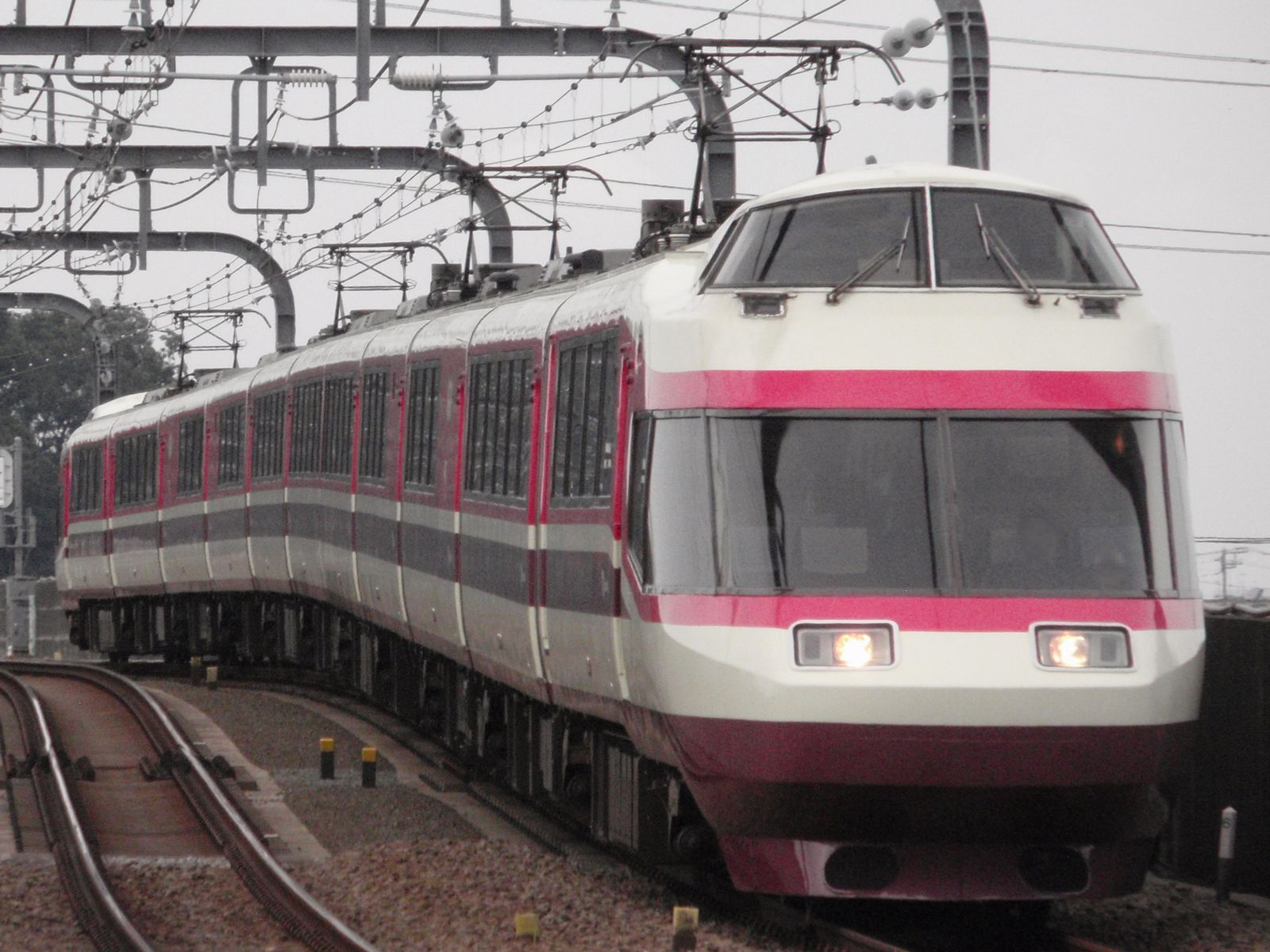
- Odakyu 10000 series HiSE
- In service: December 1987 – March 2012
- Manufacturers: Nippon Sharyo, Kawasaki Heavy Industries
- Family name: Romancecar
- Refurbished: 1999
- Number built: 44 vehicles (4 sets)
- Number in service: None
- Number preserved: 1 vehicle
- Formation: 11 cars per set
- Operator: Odakyu Electric Railway
- Depot: Kitami

Specifications
- Maximum speed: 110 km/h (70 mph)
- Traction system: Resistor control
- Power output: 140 kW (190 hp) per motor
- Electric system: 1,500 V DC overhead lines
- Current collection: Pantograph
- Braking system: Regenerative brake
- Safety system: ATS (OM)
- Track gauge: 1,067 mm (3 ft 6 in)

Notes/references
- This train won the 31st Blue Ribbon Award in 1988.

The Odakyu 10000 series HiSE (小田急10000形, Odakyū 10000-gata) (High-decker/High-grade/High-level Super Express) was an electric multiple unit (EMU) train type operated by the Odakyu Electric Railway on Romancecar services in the Tokyo area of Japan between 1987 and 2012.

== Formation ==
Each trainset consisted of 11 cars, 9 of which were powered.

== Operations ==
The 10000 series HiSE operated mainly between Shinjuku Station in Tokyo and Hakone-Yumoto Station (about 88 km).

== Resale ==
Sets number 2 and 3 were donated to the Nagano Electric Railway in 2005. They were converted to 4-car 1000 series sets at Nippon Sharyo manufacturing factory in Toyokawa, Aichi Prefecture.

== Withdrawal and preservation ==
The two remaining 10000 series HiSE sets were withdrawn by Odakyu on 16 March 2012. One car is preserved at the Romancecar Museum.

== Interior ==
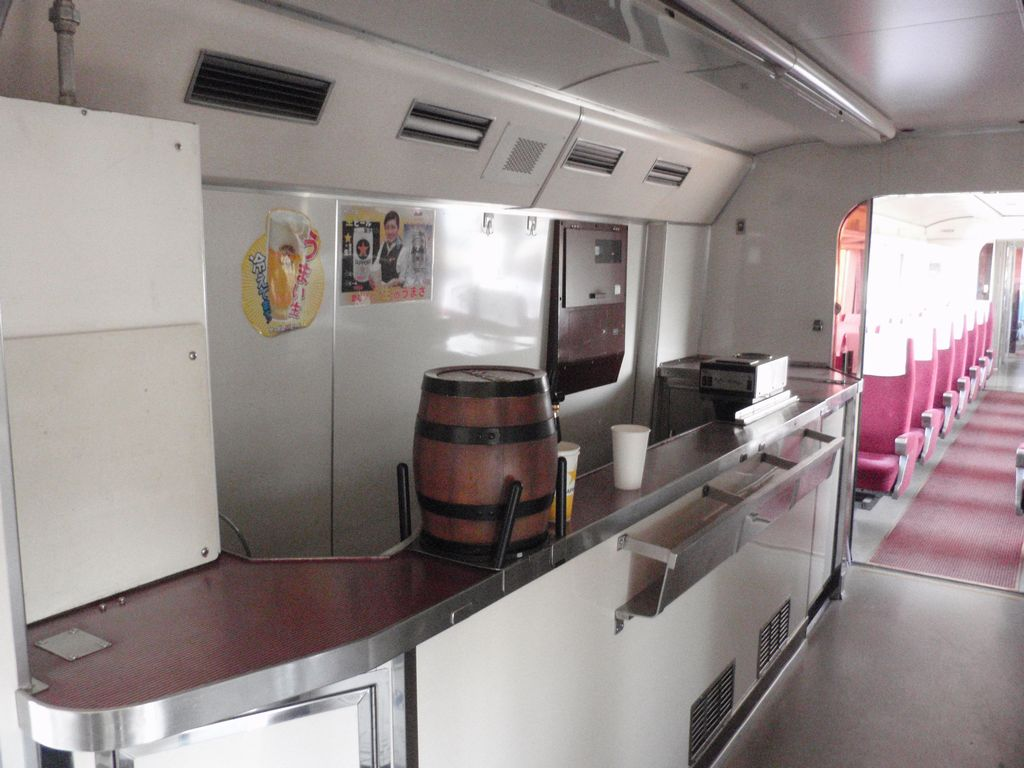
Counter

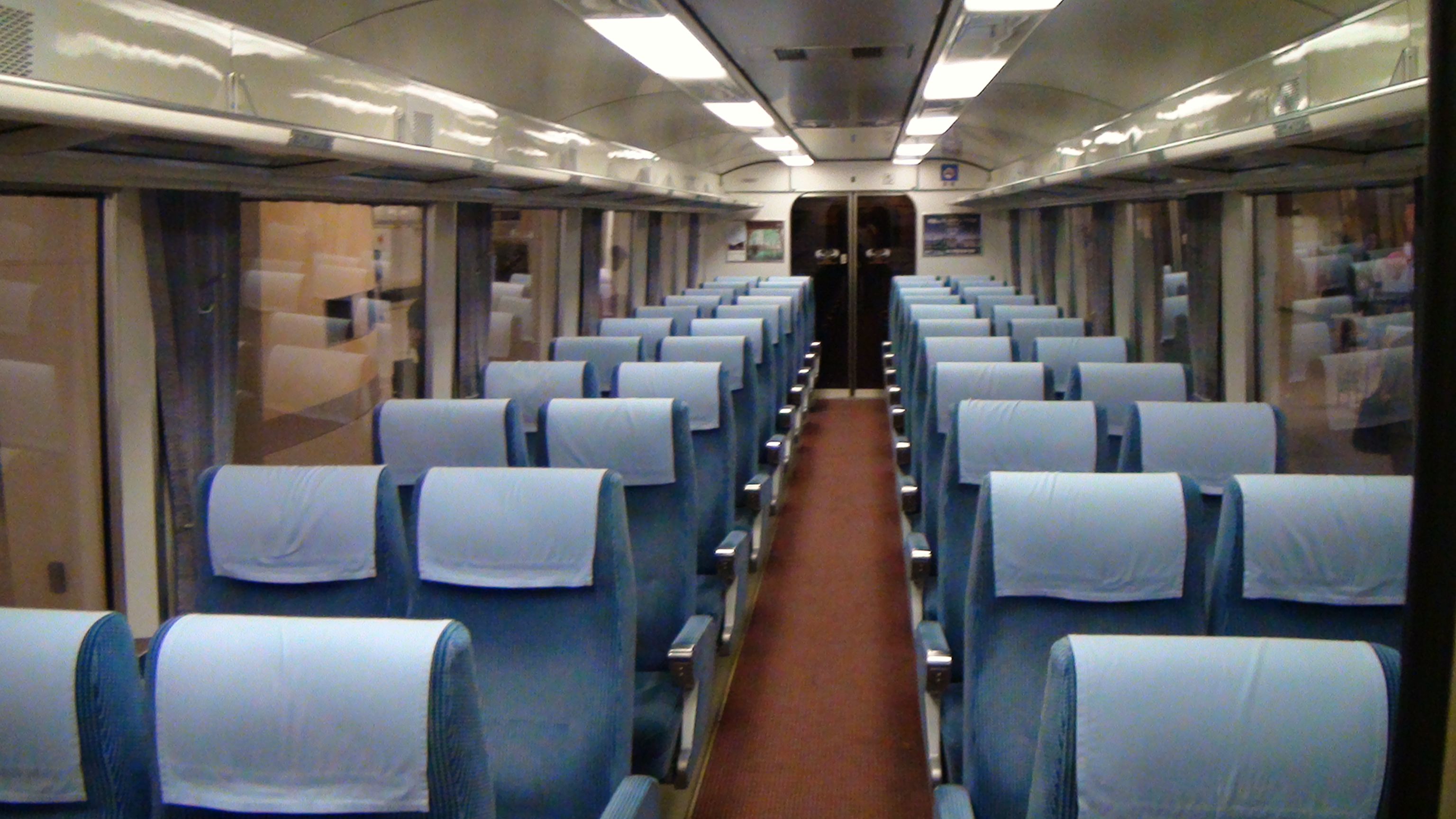
Interior

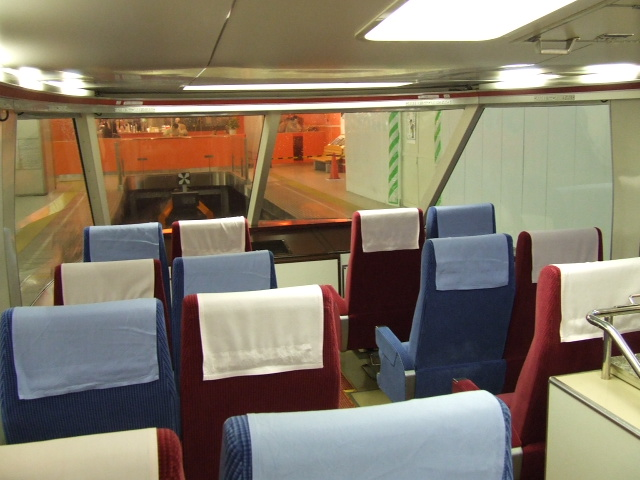
Observation Seats

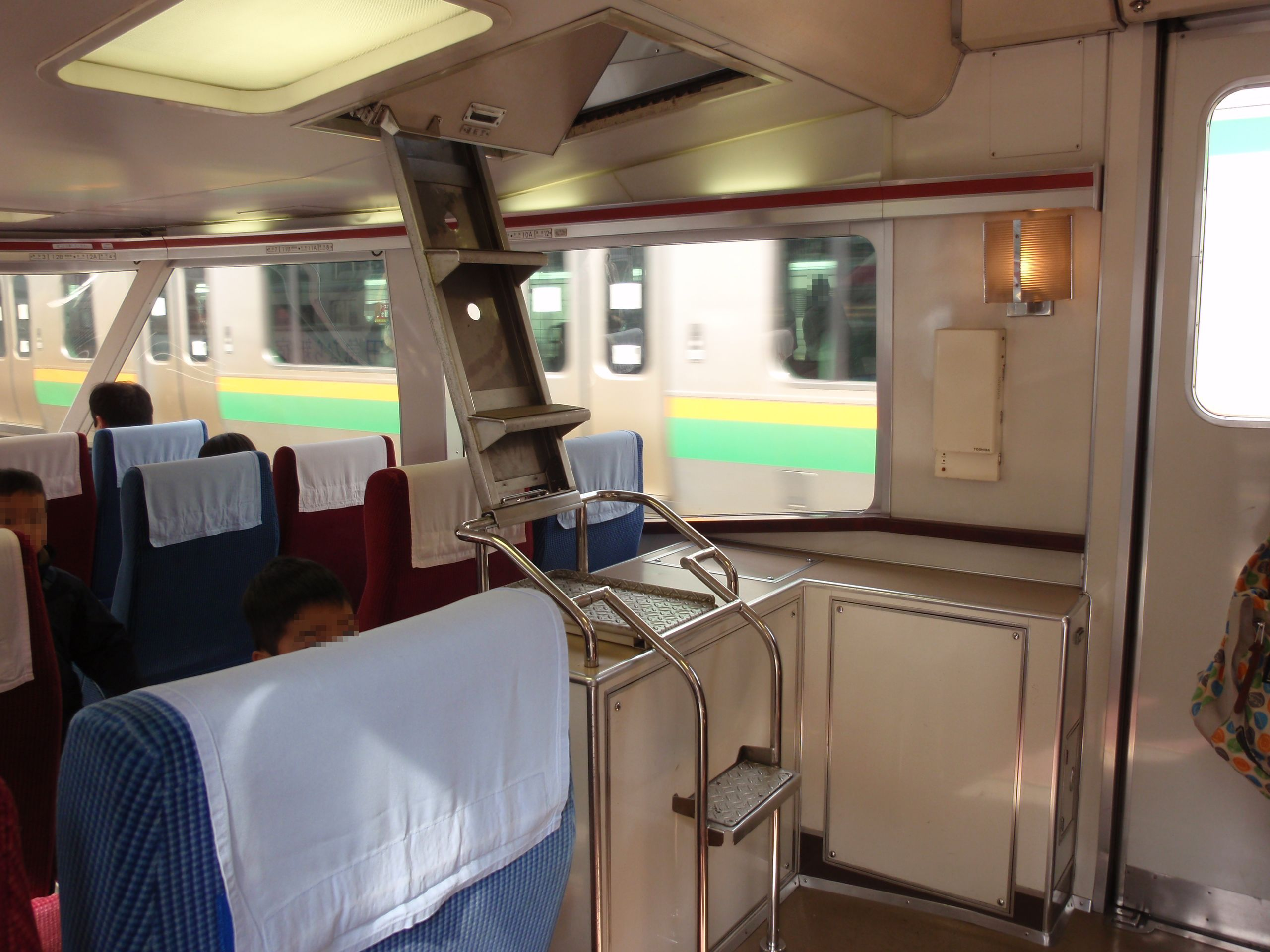
Ladder
