= 5700 =

5700 may refer to:

== In general ==
- A.D. 5700, a year in the 6th millennium CE
- 5700 BC, a year in the 6th millennium BCE
- 5700, a number in the 5000 (number) range

== Rail ==
- GWR 5700 Class, a pannier tank steam locomotive train class
- Hanshin 5700 series, an electrical multiple unit train series
- Meitetsu 5700 series, an electric multiple unit train series
- Tobu 5700 series, a train type from Tobu Railway

== Other uses ==
- 5700 Homerus, an asteroid
- Nokia 5700 XpressMusic, a smartphone
