= 21000 series =

21000 series may refer to:

- Kintetsu 21000 series EMU
- Sotetsu 21000 series, an 8-car derivative of the Sotetsu 20000 series EMU
