= Keikyu 700 series (1956) =

Japanese trains introduced in 1956 and later reclassified as 600 series

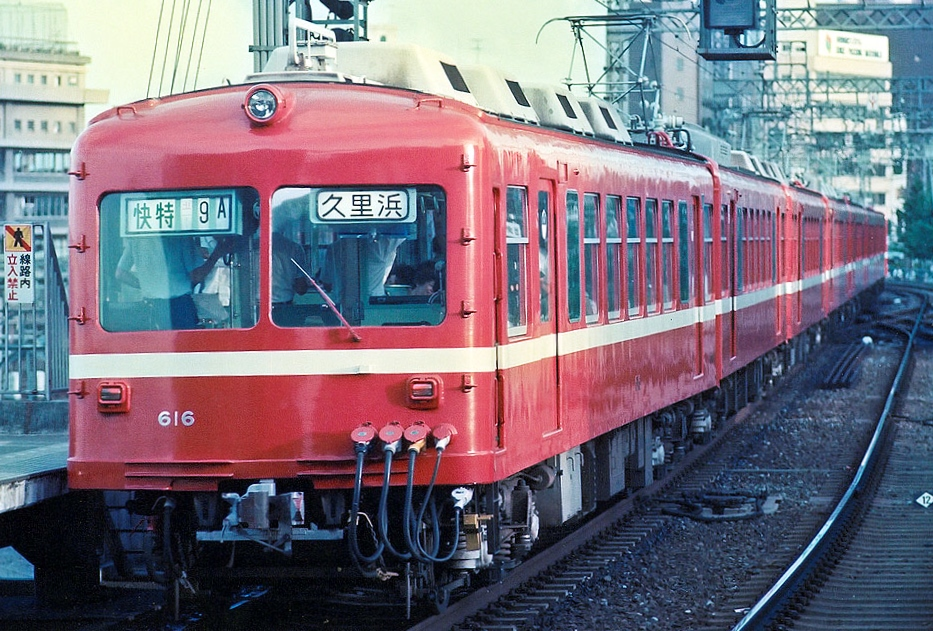
- A 600 series set in 1985
- In service: 1956–1986
- Manufacturers: Kawasaki Heavy Industries, Tokyu Car
- Number in service: None
- Number preserved: 1 car
- Formation: 2, 4 or 6 cars per trainset
- Operator: Keikyu

Specifications
- Car body construction: Steel
- Doors: 2 per side
- Maximum speed: 105 km/h (65 mph) (service); 120 km/h (75 mph) (design)
- Power output: 75 kW (101 hp) × 4 per motor car
- Acceleration: 2.3 km/(h⋅s) (1.4 mph/s)
- Electric system: 1,500 V DC
- Current collection: Pantograph
- Track gauge: 1,435 mm (4 ft 8 1/2 in)

The Keikyu 700 series (京急700形), later reclassified Keikyu 600 series (京急600形), was a DC electric multiple unit (EMU) train type operated by the private railway operator Keikyu on limited-stop commuter services in the Tokyo area of Japan from 1956 until 1986.

== Interior ==
Passenger accommodation consisted of facing four-person seating bays, with longitudinal bench seats near the doorways.

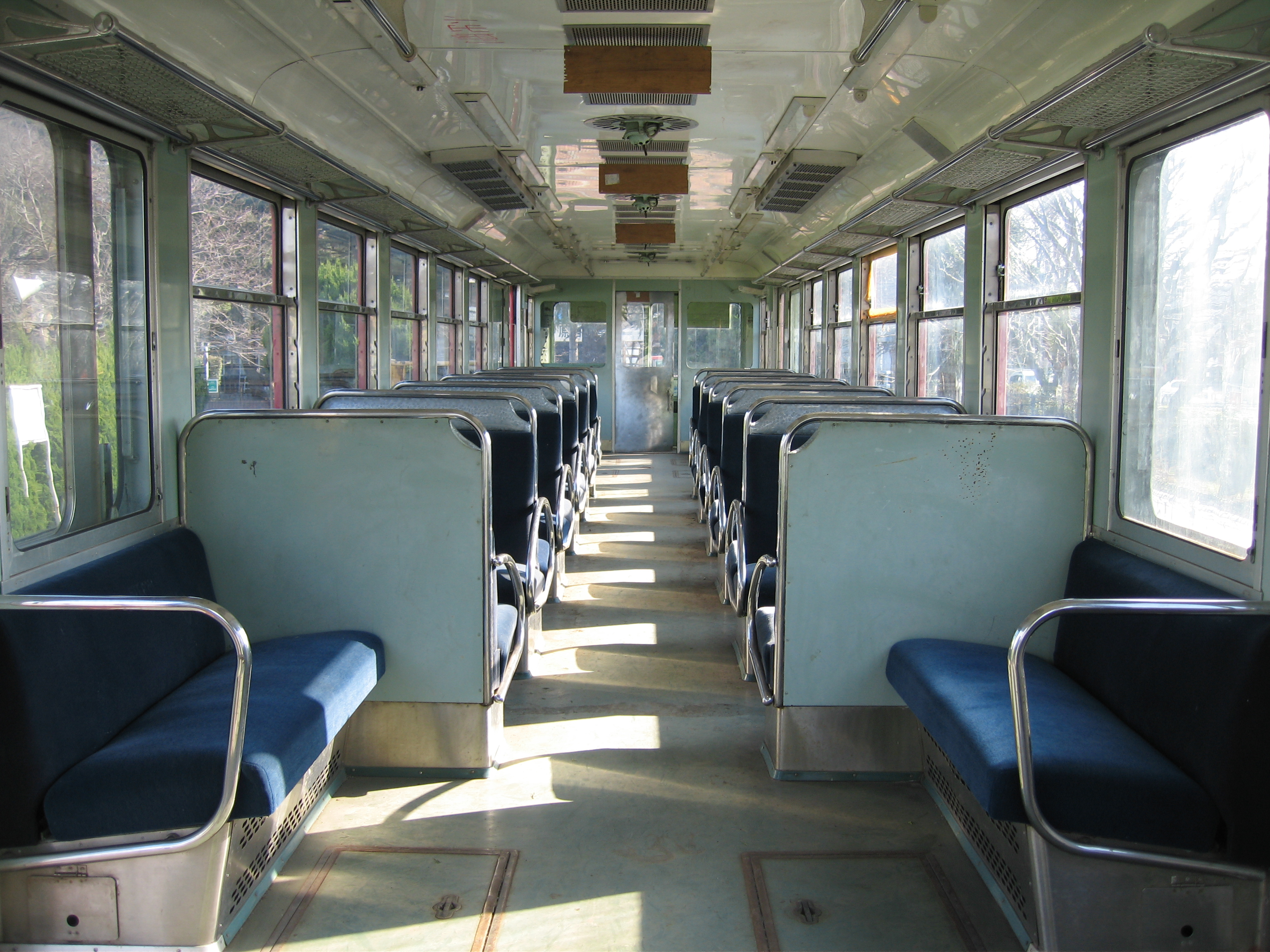
Interior of preserved car DeHa 601 in January 2008

== History ==
The 700 series trains were first introduced in 1956, broadly based on the earlier 500 series trains.

From April 1966, the trains were reclassified "600 series", and roughly half of the former driving cars were rebuilt as intermediate cars with the cabs removed. At the same time, the headlamps were changed from the original incandescent light bulbs to sealed beam headlamps, and the original steel doors were replaced with new stainless steel doors.

Withdrawals of the 600 series trains commenced in 1984 with the introduction of 2000 series trains, and the last members of the fleet were withdrawn in March 1986 following a Sayonara (farewell) run.

== Resale ==
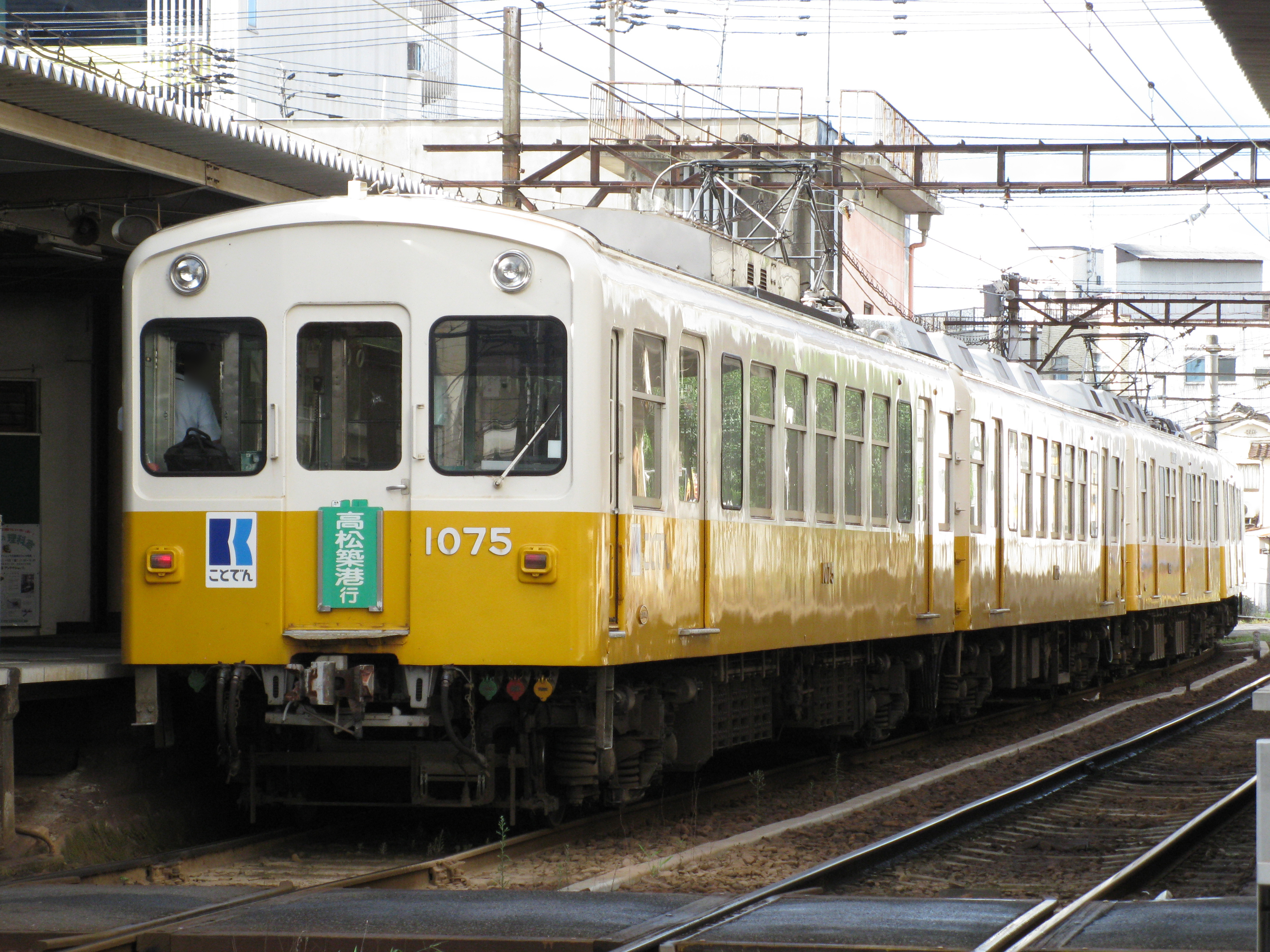
A Kotoden 1070 series set in August 2010

Six former 600 series cars were resold to the Takamatsu-Kotohira Electric Railroad ("Kotoden") in Shikoku, where they became the 1070 series, modified with front-end gangways and longitudinal seating.

The identities and histories of the six 600 series cars sold to Kotoden are as shown below.

Keikyu No.	Type	Withdrawn	Resold to Kotoden	Kotoden No.
605	M1c	31 May 1984	23 December 1984	1071
608	M2c	31 May 1984	23 December 1984	1072
609	M1c	31 March 1986	1 April 1987	1073
612	M2c	31 March 1986	1 April 1987	1074
613	M1c	31 March 1986	4 December 1986	1075
616	M2c	31 March 1986	4 December 1986	1076

== Preservation ==
Car DeHa 601 is preserved in the No. 1 Recreation Park in Zushi, Kanagawa.

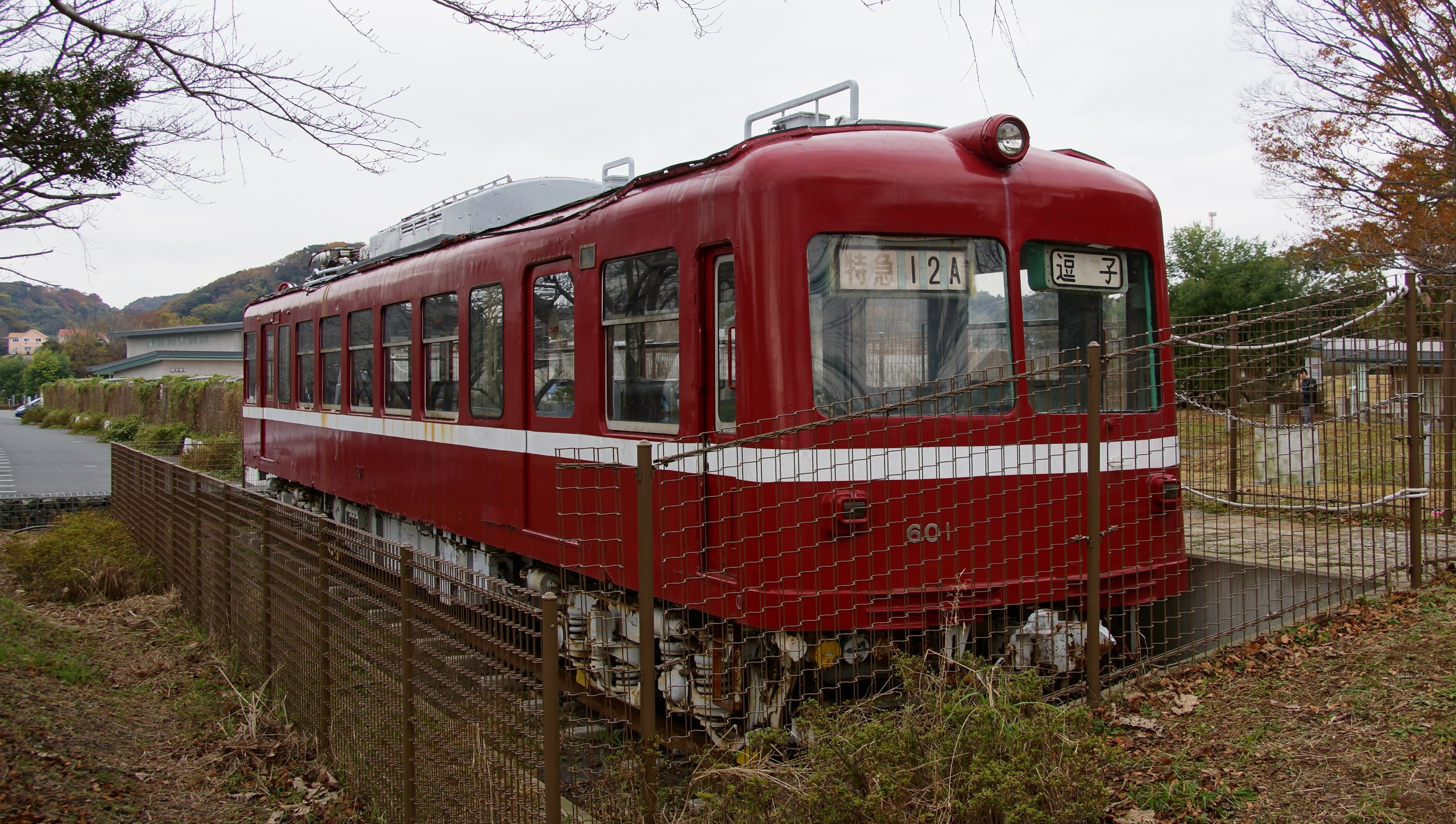
Preserved car DeHa 601 in November 2017
