= Odakyu 3000 series SE =

Limited express electric multiple unit of Odakyu Electric Railway and Ōigawa Railway

Odakyu 3000 series SE/SSE
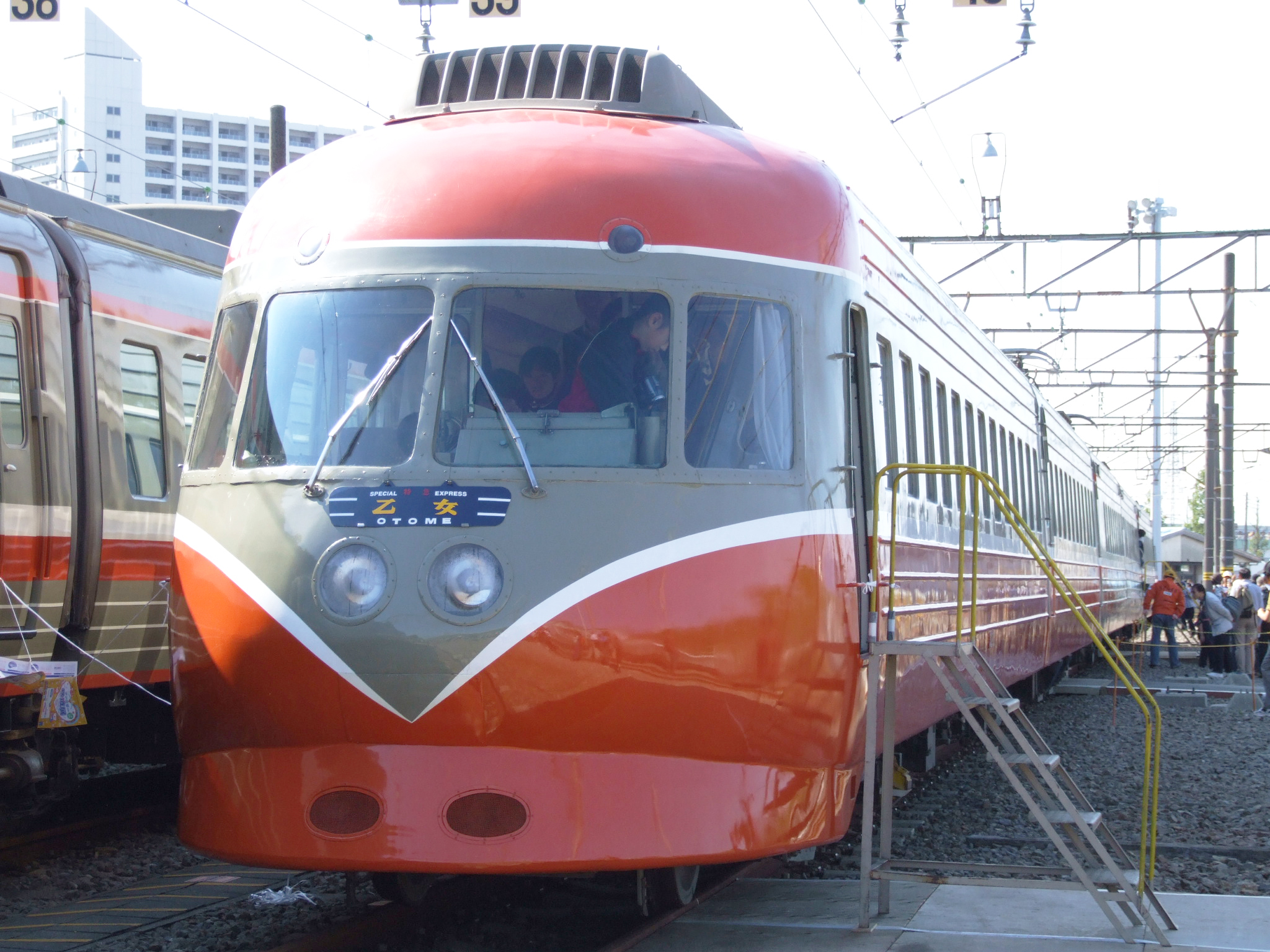
- Preserved Odakyu 3000 series SE at Ebina depot (October 2007)
- In service: 1957–1991
- Manufacturer: Nippon Sharyo, Kawasaki Heavy Industries
- Family name: Romancecar
- Constructed: 1957–1959
- Entered service: July 1957
- Scrapped: 1992
- Number built: 32 vehicles
- Formation: 8 cars per set (initial); 5 cars per set (from 1968)
- Capacity: 348 (initial); 316 (from 1962); 222 (from 1968)
- Operators: Odakyu Electric Railway

Specifications
- Car length: 15,950 mm (lead car, initial); 16,150 mm (lead car, from 1968); 12,700 mm (intermediate car)
- Width: 2,864 mm (lead car, intermediate car with pantograph); 2,800 mm (intermediate car without pantograph)
- Height: 3,450 mm (lead car, intermediate car without pantograph); 4,015 mm (intermediate car with pantograph)
- Maximum speed: 110 km/h (operating); 147.5 km/h (design)
- Weight: 146.75 t (initial); 159 t (from 1962); 113.47 t (from 1968)
- Traction system: Resistor control (electric camshaft)
- Power output: 100 kW (375 V terminal voltage, 1,800 rpm)
- Transmission: Axis Cardan Driveshaft
- Acceleration: 1.6 km/h/s
- Deceleration: 4.15 km/h/s
- Electric system(s): 1,500 V DC
- Current collection: Overhead lines
- Braking system(s): Dynamic and electromagnetic braking (HSC-D)
- Safety system(s): OM-ATS, ATS-S
- Track gauge: 1,067 mm (3 ft 6 in)

Notes/references
- This train won the 1st Blue Ribbon Award in 1957.

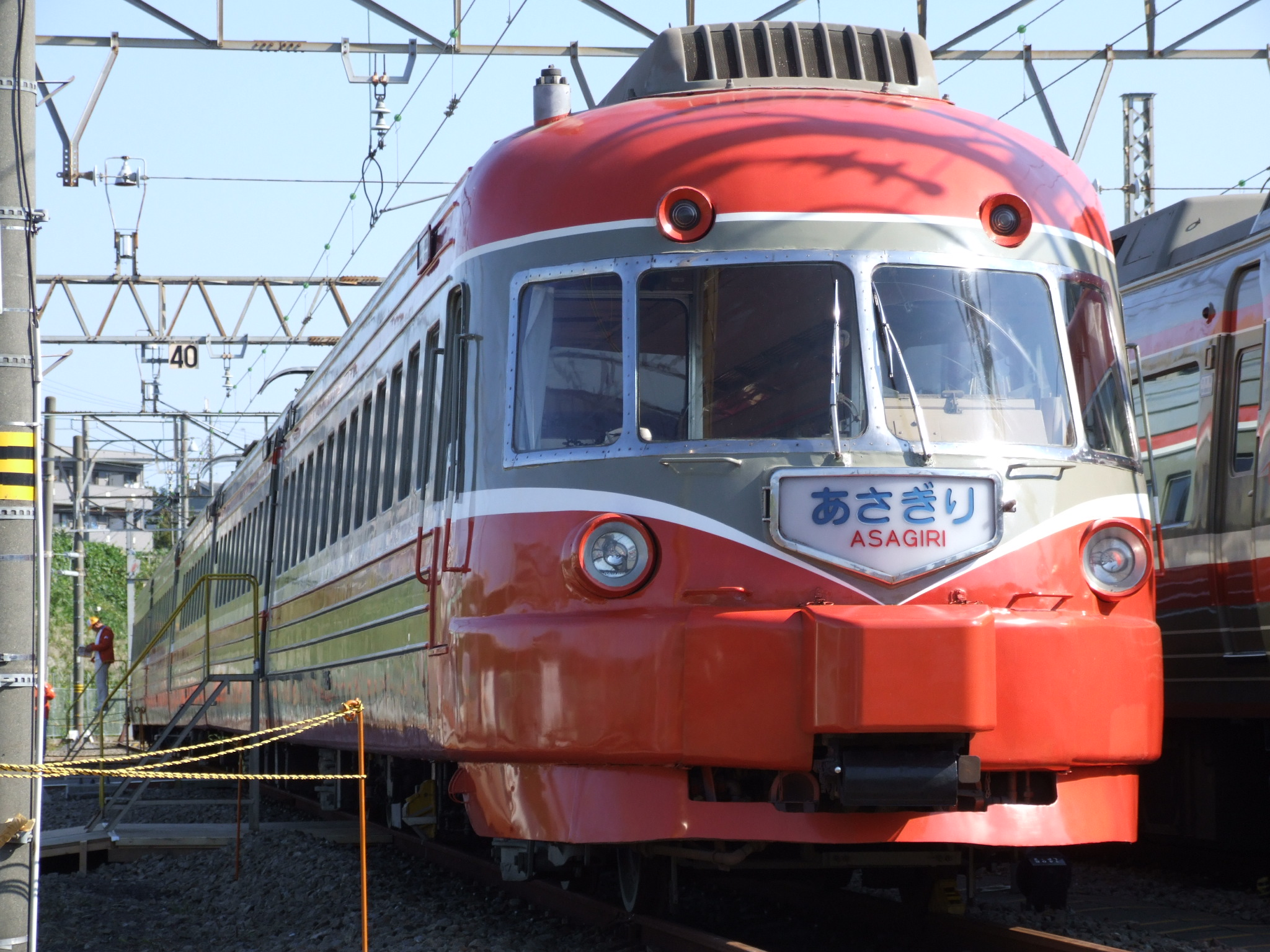
Preserved Odakyu 3000 series SSE at Ebina depot (October 2007)

The Odakyu 3000 series (小田急3000形, Odakyū sanzen-gata) or SE (Super Express), later becoming SSE (Short Super Express), was a "Romancecar" electric multiple unit (EMU) train type operated by the Odakyu Electric Railway in the Tokyo area of Japan. It was the recipient of the inaugural Blue Ribbon Award presented by the Japan Railfan Club in 1958.

== Design ==
The 3000 series trains were articulated with shared bogies, six of which were motored.

== Formations ==
=== 8-car 3000 series SE ===
The original 8-car "SE" sets were formed as shown below.

Designation	M1c	M2	M3	M4	M5	M6	M7	M8c
Weight (t)	24.87	17.19	16.00	16.28	15.13	15.75	17.44	24.34
Seating capacity	52	40	38	44	44	38	40	52

The M2 and M7 cars were each fitted with one PT42-K lozenge-type pantograph.

== Interior ==
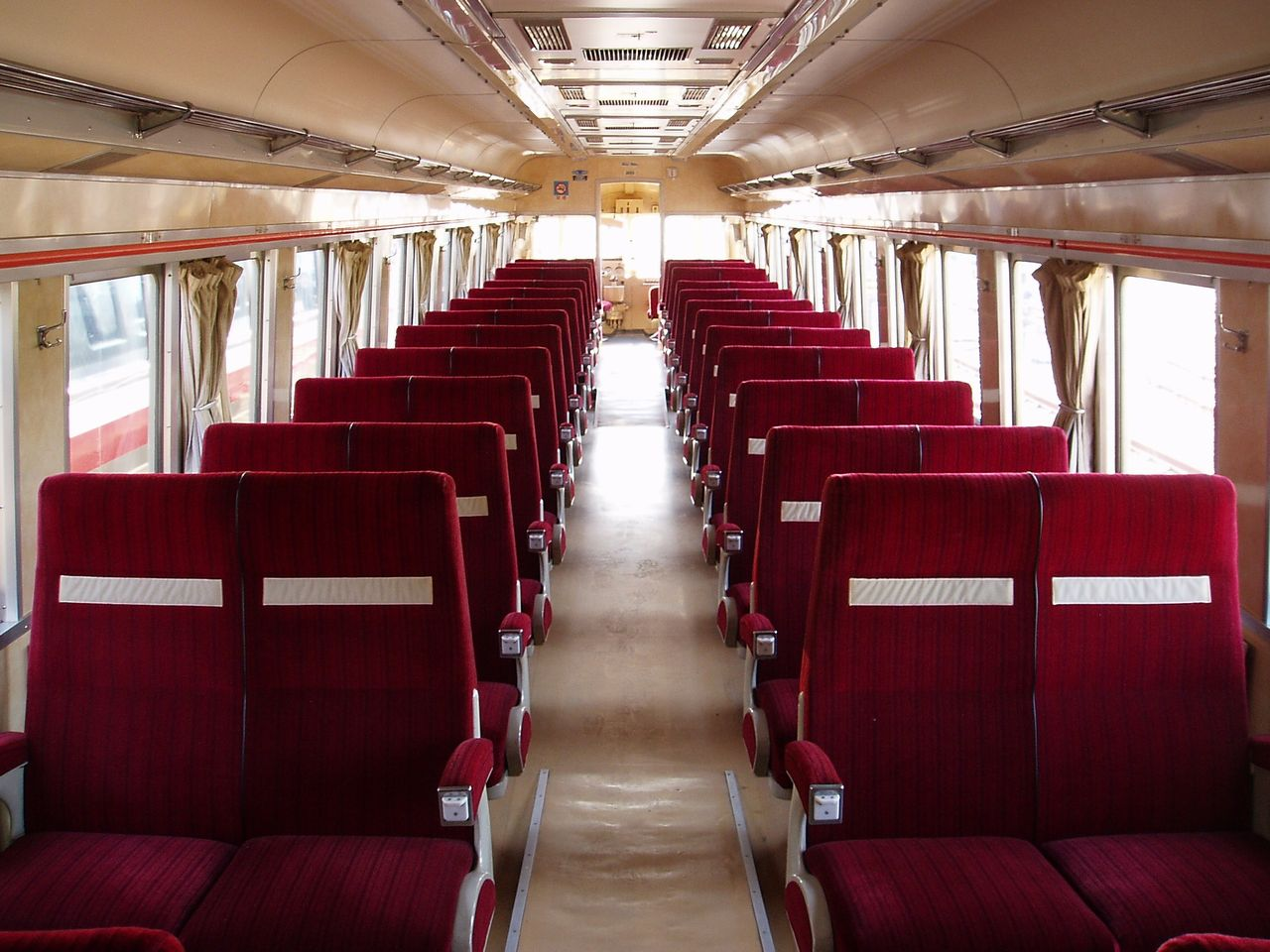
Inside

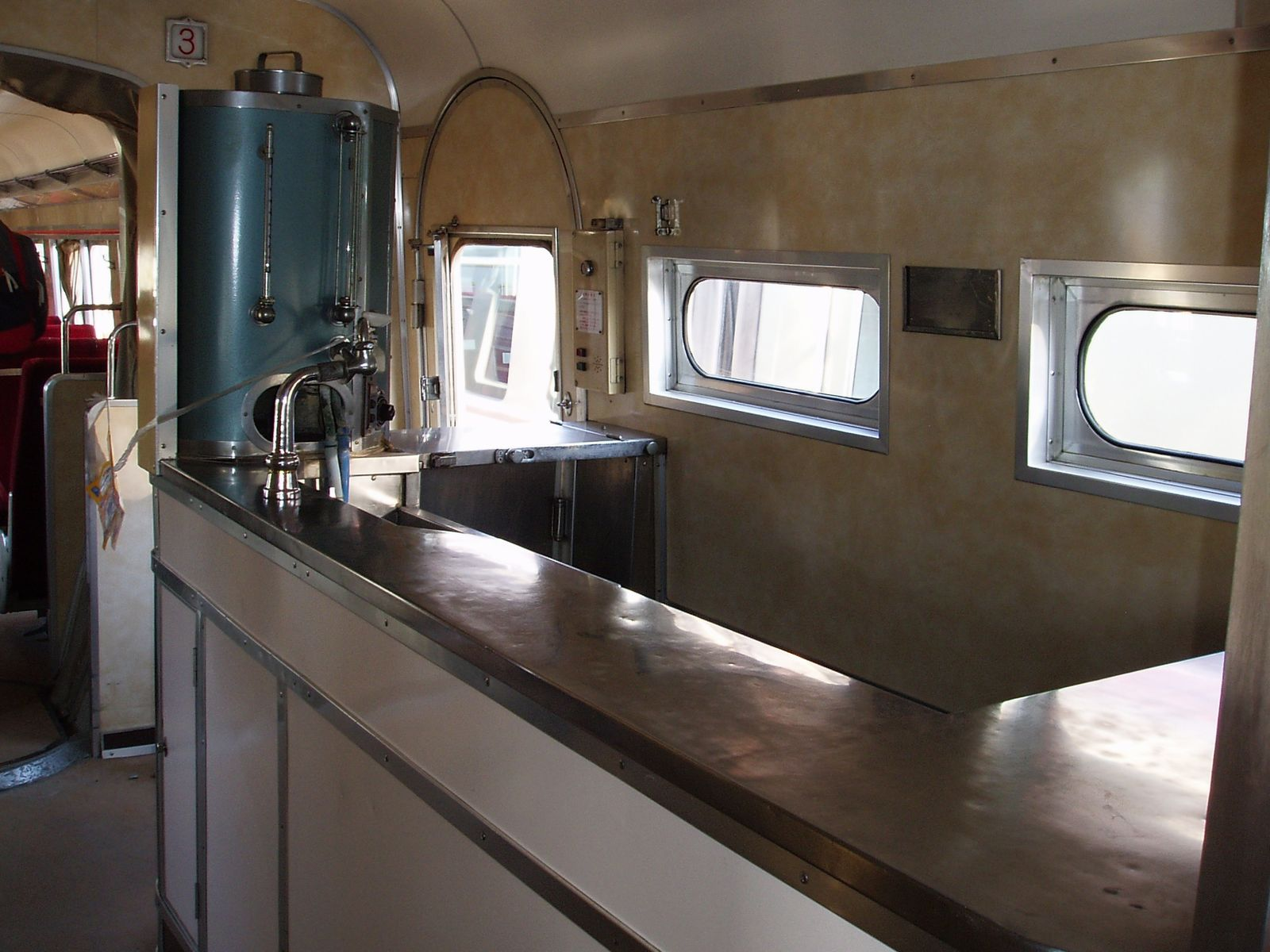
Refreshment Counter

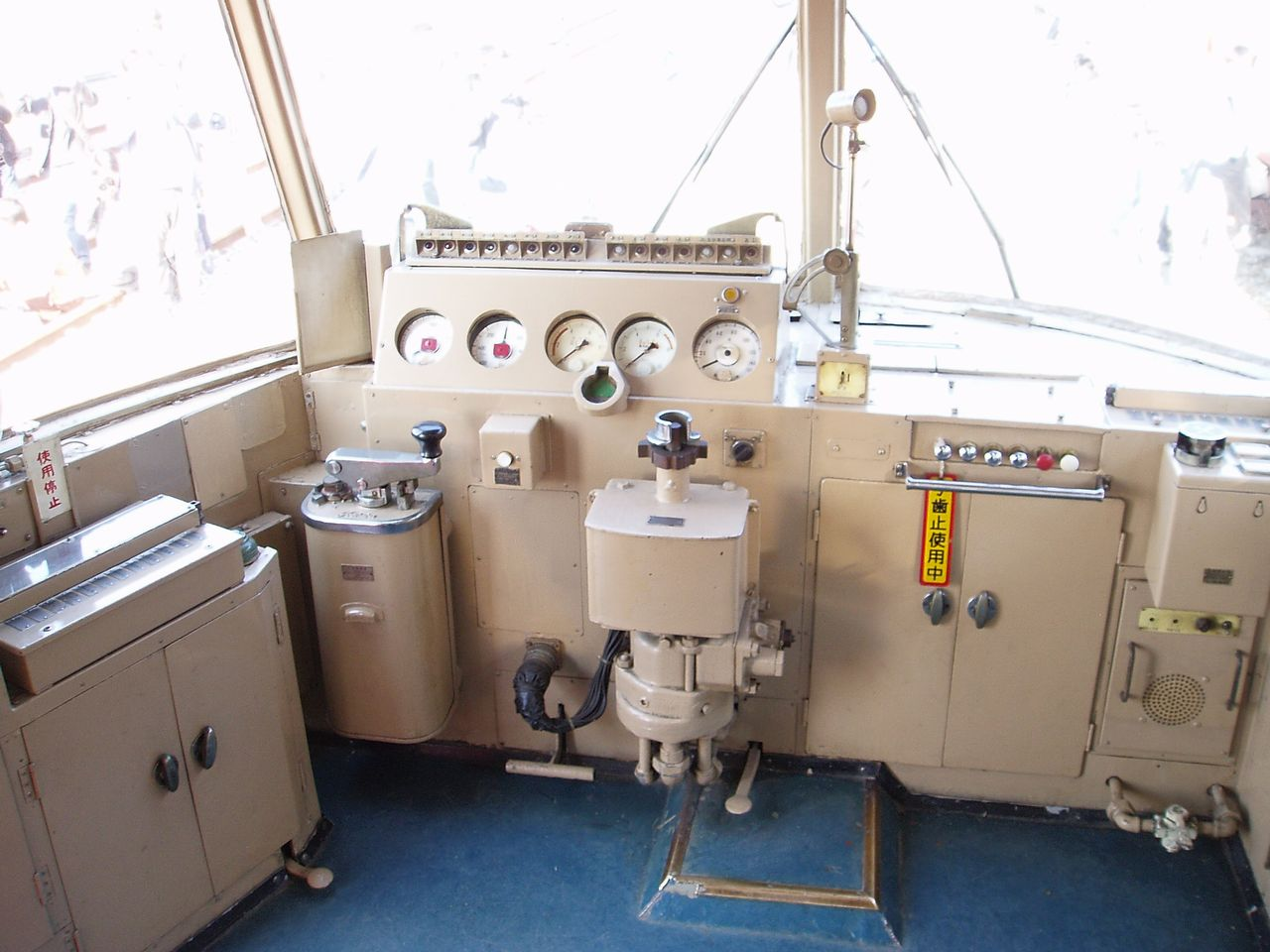
Driver's Cab

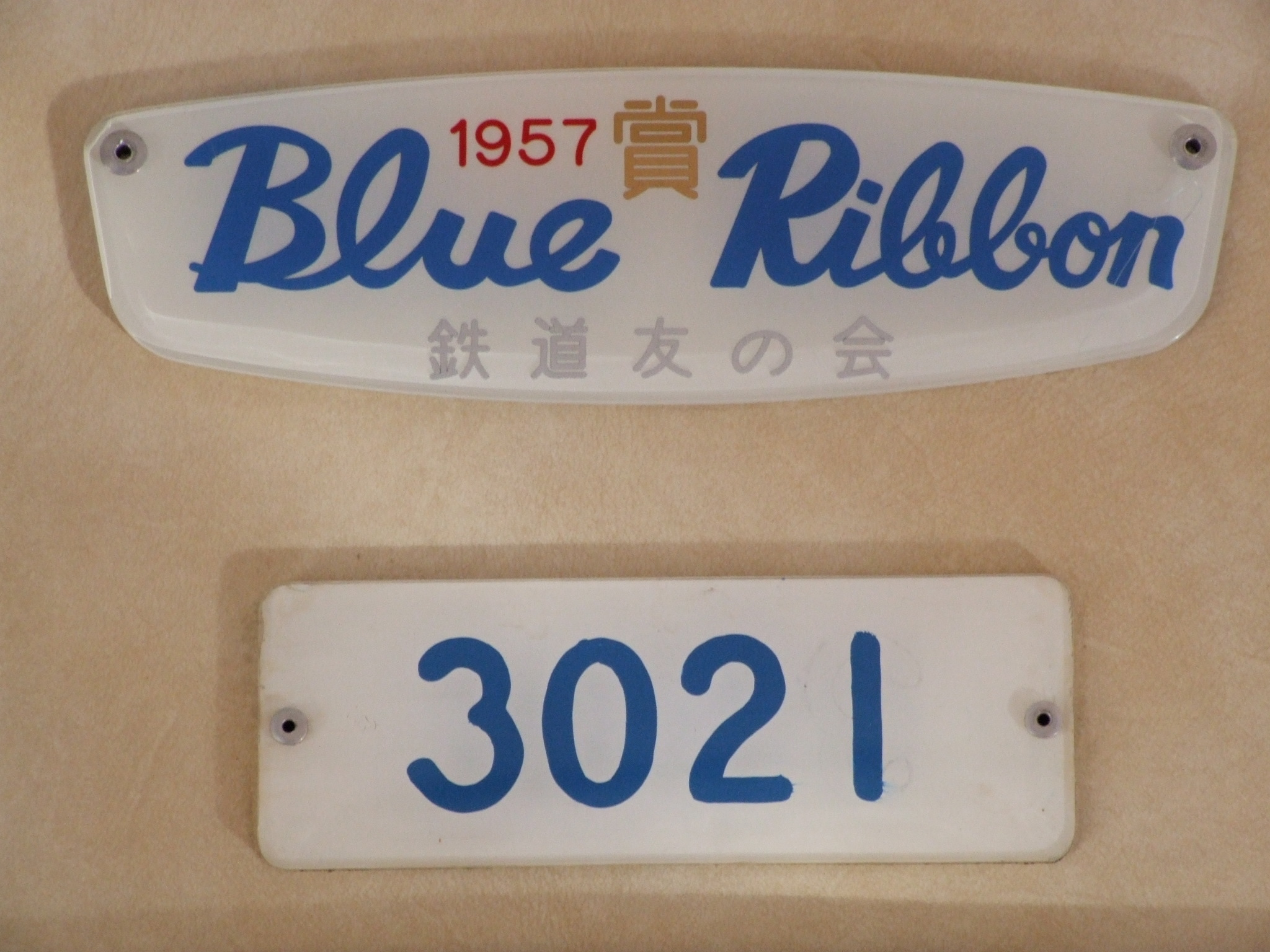
Blue Ribbon Award plaque

== History ==
Service first started in 1957 with the SE trainset, which, on a trial run, attained the world speed record at the time (145 km/h (90 mph)) for a narrow gauge train. This record gave impetus for the design of the first Shinkansen, the 0 Series.

This train adopted articulated bogies for comfort, efficiency, economy, and speed. This feature would be adopted by the NSE, LSE, HiSE, and VSE trainsets.

The 50th anniversary of the Romancecar's narrow gauge world speed record was celebrated on 28 September 2007.

The trains were reformed from eight cars to five in 1968, becoming the 3000 series SSE (Short Super Express).

The SE trains were in service from 1957 to 1968, and the SSE from 1968 to 1991.
