= Blue Ribbon Award (railway) =

Annual award for railway vehicles in Japan

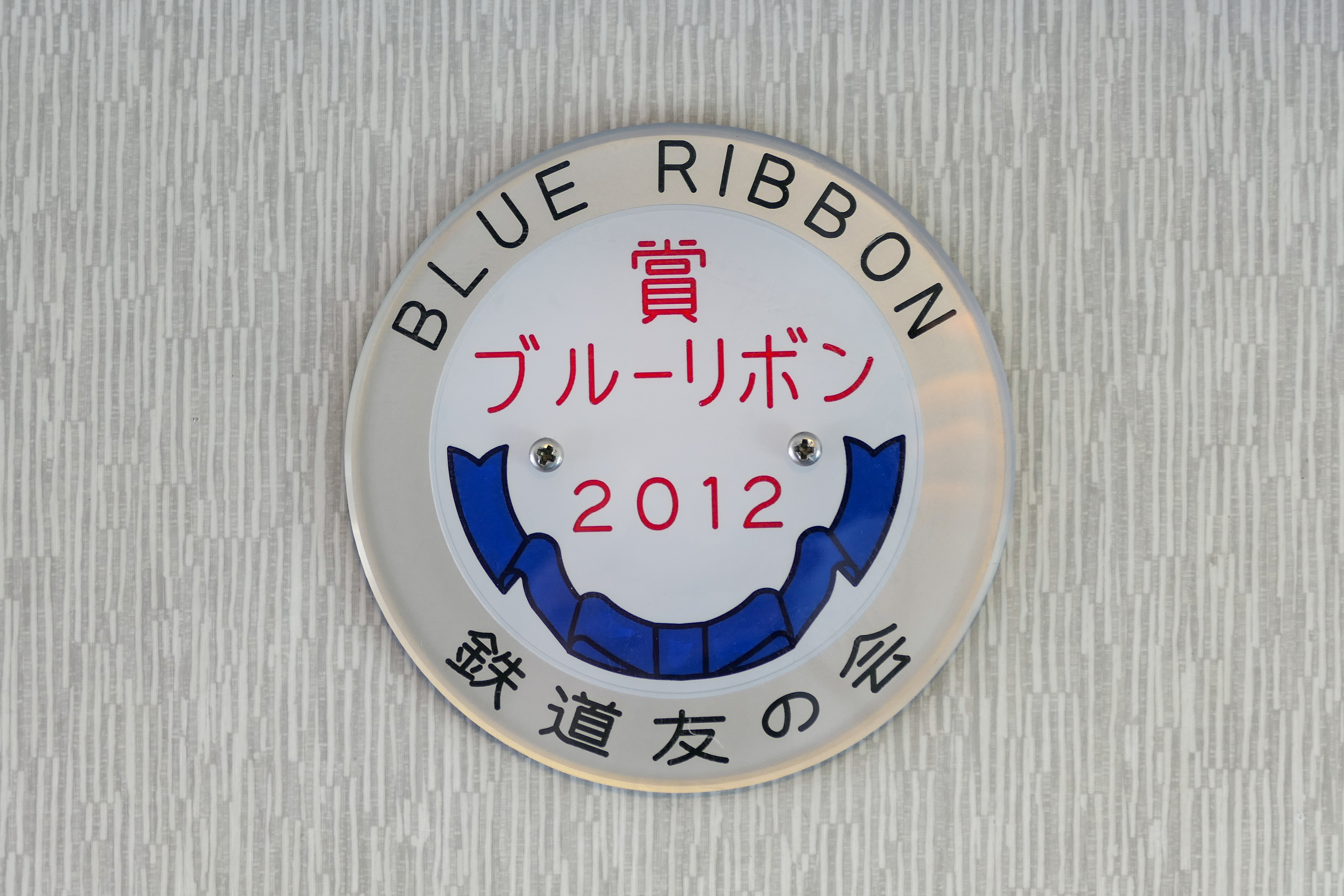
- 2012 Blue Ribbon Award plaque inside an E5 Series Shinkansen EMU
- Awarded for: Most popular and outstanding railway vehicle that entered service in the previous year
- Date: June 20, 1958
- Country: Japan
- Presented by: Japan Railfan Club
- First award: 1958
- Currently held by: MoBo 1 "KYOTRAM"

Highlights
- Most awards: Kintetsu Railway
- Website: https://www.jrc.gr.jp/e/award/bl
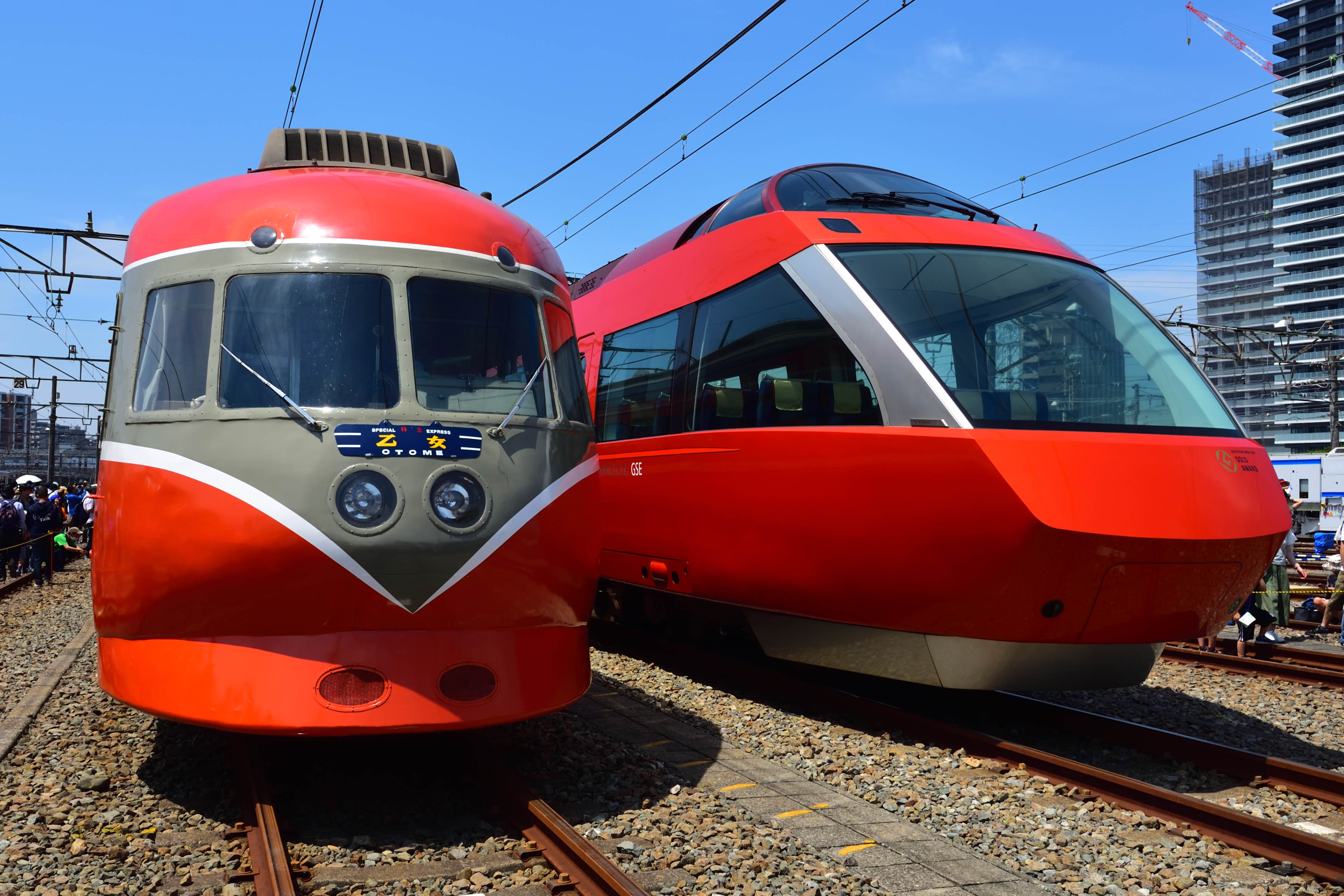
- The 1st Prize Odakyu 3000 series SE (left); The 62nd Prize Odakyu 70000 series GSE

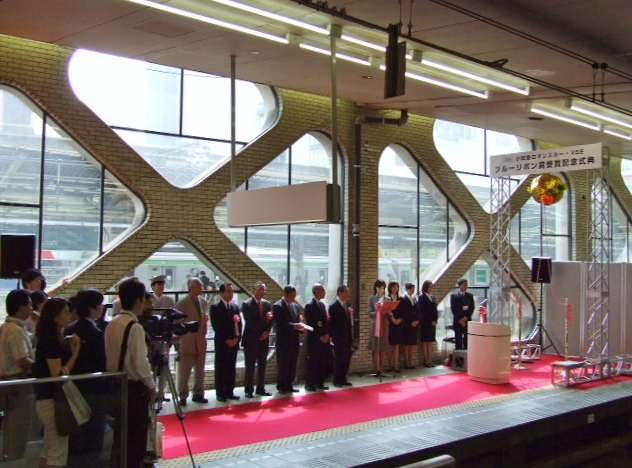
2006 Blue Ribbon Award ceremony at Shinjuku Station for the Odakyu 50000 series "VSE" Romancecar EMU, September 2006

The Blue Ribbon Award (ブルーリボン賞, Burū Ribon Shō) is an award presented annually in Japan since 1958 by the Japan Railfan Club. It is awarded for railway vehicles that entered service in the previous year and were voted by members as being the most outstanding design of the year.

== Award winners ==
The list of award winners since 1958 is as follows.

Award	Year	Train	Operator	Image
1	1958	3000 series SE EMU	Odakyu Electric Railway	
2	1959	151 series Kodama EMU	JNR	
3	1960	10100 series Vistacar II EMU	Kintetsu	
4	1961	KiHa 81 series Hatsukari DMU	JNR	
5	1962	7000 series Panorama Car EMU	Nagoya Railroad	
6	1963	20100 series Aozora EMU	Kintetsu	
7	1964	3100 series NSE EMU	Odakyu Electric Railway	
8	1965	0 Series Shinkansen	JNR	
9	1966	KiHa 8000 series DMU	Nagoya Railroad	
10	1967	18200 series EMU	Kintetsu	
11	1968	581 series Gekkō EMU	JNR	
12	1969	Class EF66 electric locomotive	JNR	
13	1970	5000 series Red Arrow EMU	Seibu Railway	
14	1971	Not awarded	—N/a	
15	1972	14 series coach	JNR	
16	1973	183 series EMU	JNR	
17	1974	AE series Skyliner EMU	Keisei Electric Railway	
18	1975	Not awarded	—N/a	
19	1976	6300 series EMU	Hankyu	
20	1977	6000 series EMU	Nagoya Railroad	
21	1978	12400 series Sunny Car EMU	Kintetsu	
22	1979	30000 series Vistacar III (now Vista EX) EMU	Kintetsu	
23	1980	1000 series EMU	Enoshima Electric Railway	
24	1981	7000 series LSE EMU	Odakyu Electric Railway	
25	1982	1000 series Bernina EMU	Hakone Tozan Railway	
26	1983	2000 series EMU	Keikyu	
27	1984	14 series Salon Express Tokyo train	JNR	
28	1985	8800 series Panorama DX EMU	Nagoya Railroad	
29	1986	2100 series Resort 21 EMU	Izukyū Corporation	
30	1987	KiHa 83/84 Furano Express DMU	JR Hokkaido	
31	1988	10000 series HiSE EMU	Odakyu Electric Railway	
32	1989	21000 series Urban Liner EMU	Kintetsu	
33	1990	651 series Super Hitachi EMU	JR East	
34	1991	100 series Spacia EMU	Tobu Railway	
35	1992	20000 series RSE EMU	Odakyu Electric Railway	
36	1993	787 series Tsubame EMU	JR Kyushu	
37	1994	Not awarded	—N/a	
38	1995	50000 series Rapi:t EMU	Nankai Electric Railway	
39	1996	883 series Sonic EMU	JR Kyushu	
40	1997	Not awarded	—N/a	
41	1998	500 Series Shinkansen Nozomi	JR West	
42	1999	285 series Sunrise Express EMU	JR Central & JR West	
43	2000	E26 series Cassiopeia sleeping car	JR East	
44	2001	885 series Shiroi Kamome EMU	JR Kyushu	
45	2002	E257 series Azusa / Kaiji EMU	JR East	
46	2003	21020 series Urban Liner Next EMU	Kintetsu	
47	2004	5100 type bilevel cab car Marine Liner EMU	JR Shikoku	
48	2005	M250 series Super Rail Cargo EMU	JR Freight	
49	2006	50000 series VSE EMU	Odakyu Electric Railway	
50	2007	0600 series "Portram"	Toyama Light Rail	
51	2008	N700 Series Shinkansen	JR Central & JR West	
52	2009	60000 series MSE EMU	Odakyu Electric Railway	
53	2010	E259 series Narita Express EMU	JR East	
54	2011	AE series Skyliner EMU	Keisei Electric Railway	
55	2012	E5 Series Shinkansen	JR East	
56	2013	1000 series EMU	Tokyo Metro	
57	2014	50000 series Shimakaze EMU	Kintetsu	
58	2015	E7 and W7 Series Shinkansen	JR East/JR West	
59	2016	5700 series Jet Silver 5700 EMU	Hanshin Electric Railway	
60	2017	BEC819 series DENCHA BEMU	JR Kyushu	
61	2018	35 series coach	JR West	
62	2019	70000 series GSE EMU	Odakyu Electric Railway	
63	2020	001 series Laview EMU	Seibu Railway	
64	2021	80000 series Hinotori EMU	Kintetsu	
65	2022	1000-1890 series Le Ciel EMU	Keikyu	
66	2023	HC85 series DEMU	JR Central	
67	2024	N100 series Spacia X EMU	Tobu Railway	
68	2025	273 series Yakumo EMU	JR West	
69	2026	MoBo 1 "KYOTRAM"	Keifuku Electric Railroad	

== See also ==
- List of motor vehicle awards
- Laurel Prize
