= Meitetsu 8800 series =

Japanese train type

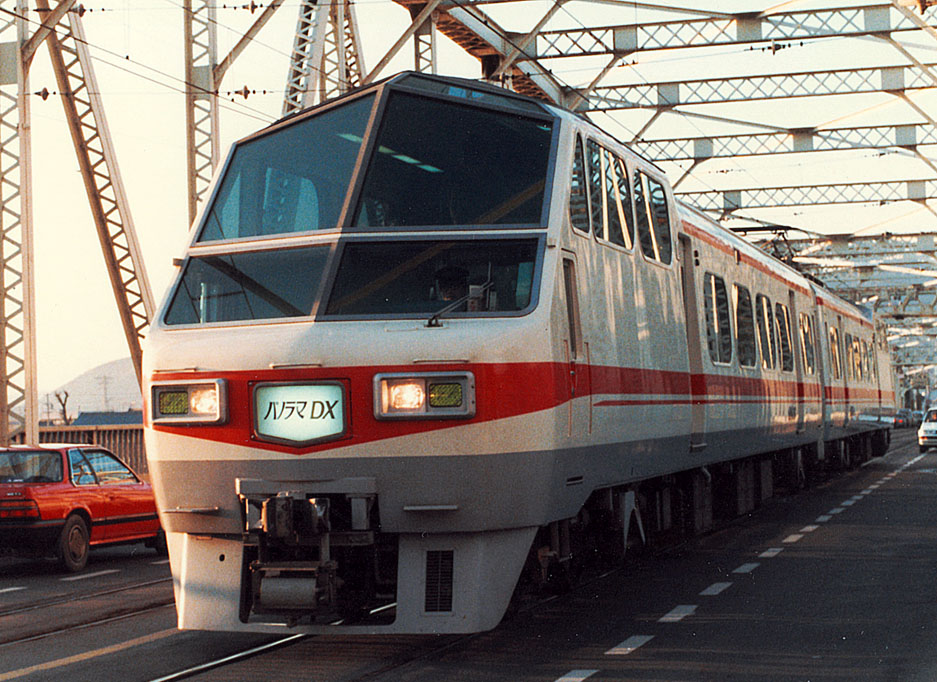
- A 2-car 8800 series consist in 1986
- In service: December 1984 – January 2005
- Manufacturer: Nippon Sharyo
- Family name: Panorama DX
- Entered service: 15 December 1984
- Number built: 12 cars (4 sets)
- Number in service: None
- Number preserved: 1 vehicle (front end only)
- Number scrapped: 11 cars (3 sets)
- Formation: 3 cars (formerly 2) per set
- Fleet numbers: 8801–8808, 8851, 8853, 8855, 8857
- Operators: Nagoya Railroad
- Lines served: Meitetsu Nagoya Main Line, Inuyama Line, Meitetsu Chita New Line

Specifications
- Car body construction: Steel
- Maximum speed: 110 km/h (68 mph)
- Traction system: Resistor control
- Electric system(s): 1,500 V DC overhead catenary
- Current collection: Lozenge-type pantograph
- Safety system(s): Meitetsu ATS
- Track gauge: 1,067 mm (3 ft 6 in)

Notes/references
- This train won the 28th Blue Ribbon Award in 1985.

The Meitetsu 8800 series (名鉄8800系) was a limited express electric multiple unit type operated by Nagoya Railroad (Meitetsu) in Japan from 1984 to 2005. It was used on Panorama DX services.

== Formations ==
=== Original 2 car sets ===
The original 2 car trains were formed as follows:

Car No.	1	2
Designation	Mc1	Mc2
Numbering	880x (odd)	880x (even)

=== Later 3 car sets ===
The later 3 car sets, introduced from 15 June 1989, were formed as follows:

Car No.	1	2	3
Designation	Mc1	T	Mc2
Numbering	880x (odd)	885x	880x (even)

The 880x cars with an even number were fitted with one lozenge-type pantograph.

== History ==
The trains started service in 1984 as 2 car units. A third car was inserted between all sets starting from 1989. However, with the decline of tourism related services, the 8800 series were relegated to trans-city expresses. Originally, the fees paid by passengers who took "Panorama DX" trains were higher than those who took "Panorama Super" services; this was later changed so both services had the same fees. As the 8800 series only had a top speed of 110 km/h, compared to the top speed of 120 km/h on "Panorama Super" trains, the 8800 series were slowly taken out of service, with all being withdrawn by late January 2005, and scrapped by March the same year.

The 8800 series was the recipient of the 28th Blue Ribbon Award held in 1985.

== Preserved examples ==
The front half of the cab section of unit 8803 has been preserved at the Maigi inspection yard.
