= Keikyu 2000 series =

Japanese train type

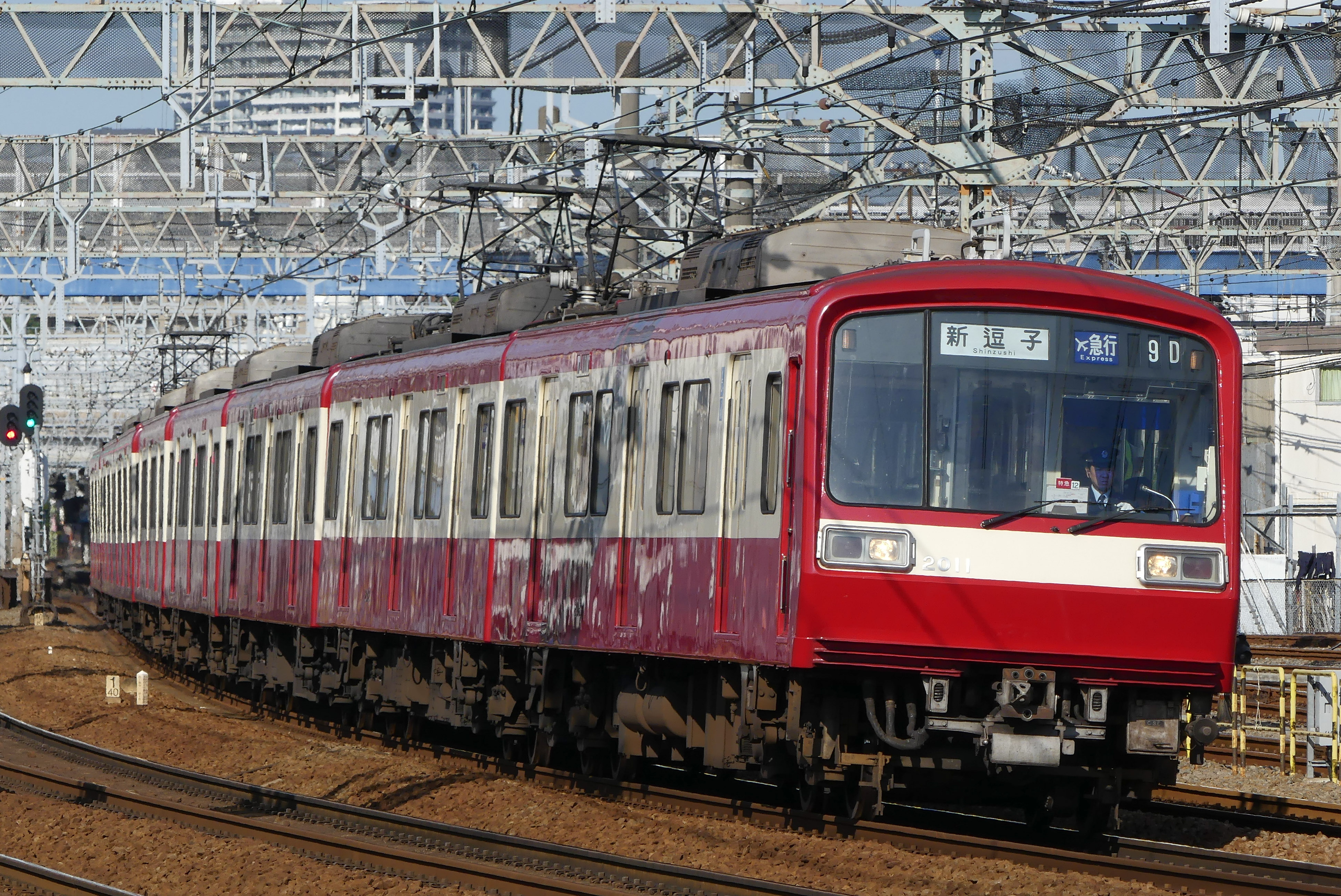
- 8-car set 2011 in November 2017
- In service: December 1982–2018
- Manufacturer: Tokyu Car Corporation, Kawasaki Heavy Industries
- Replaced: Keikyu 700 series (1956)
- Refurbished: 1998
- Scrapped: 2012–2018
- Number built: 72 vehicles (12 sets)
- Number in service: None
- Number scrapped: 36 vehicles (7 sets)
- Formation: 4/8 cars per trainset
- Fleet numbers: 2011– (8-car sets); 2411– (4-car sets)
- Operators: Keikyu

Specifications
- Car body construction: Steel
- Maximum speed: 120 km/h (75 mph)
- Traction system: Toyo Denki resistor control with field chopper control (electric camshaft)
- Traction motors: Toyo Denki and Mitsubishi Electric DC compound motor
- Electric system(s): 1,500 V DC
- Current collector(s): overhead wire
- Braking system(s): Regenerative braking
- Track gauge: 1,435 mm (4 ft 8 1/2 in)

Notes/references
- This train won the 26th Blue Ribbon Award in 1983.

The Keikyu 2000 series (京急2000形) was an electric multiple unit (EMU) train type operated by the private railway operator Keikyu on commuter services in the Tokyo area of Japan from 1982 until 2018. Originally introduced to replace the earlier 600 series sets on limited-stop Limited Express (快特, Kaitoku) services, they were rebuilt with an additional pair of doors per side and longitudinal seating from 1998 for reassignment to regular commuter services.

== Formations ==
As of 1 April 2016, the fleet consisted of five eight-car sets and one four-car set (classified 2400 series). The last remaining four-car set was withdrawn from service in October 2016.

=== 8-car sets ===
The eight-car sets are formed as follows, with six motored (M) cars and two trailer (T) cars.

Designation	M1c	M2	M3	Tu	Ts	M1	M2	M3c
Numbering	20x1	20x2	20x3	20x4	20x5	20x6	20x7	20x8

- The "x" in the car numbers corresponds to the set number.
- The two "M2" cars are each fitted with two lozenge-type pantographs.

=== 4-car sets ===
The four-car sets were formed as follows, with three motored (M) cars and one trailer (T) car.

Designation	M1c	M2	T	M3c
Numbering	24x1	24x2	24x3	24x4

- The "x" in the car numbers corresponded to the set number.
- The "M2" cars were fitted with two lozenge-type pantographs.

== Liveries ==
When delivered, the sets were initially painted in vermillion red with white around the side windows. From 1998, when converted to regular commuter use, they were repainted into all-over vermillion red with a white bodyside stripe.

From January 2013, set 2011 was repainted into the original livery of vermillion with white window surrounds to mark the 30th anniversary of the 2000 series. It remained in this livery for approximately two years.

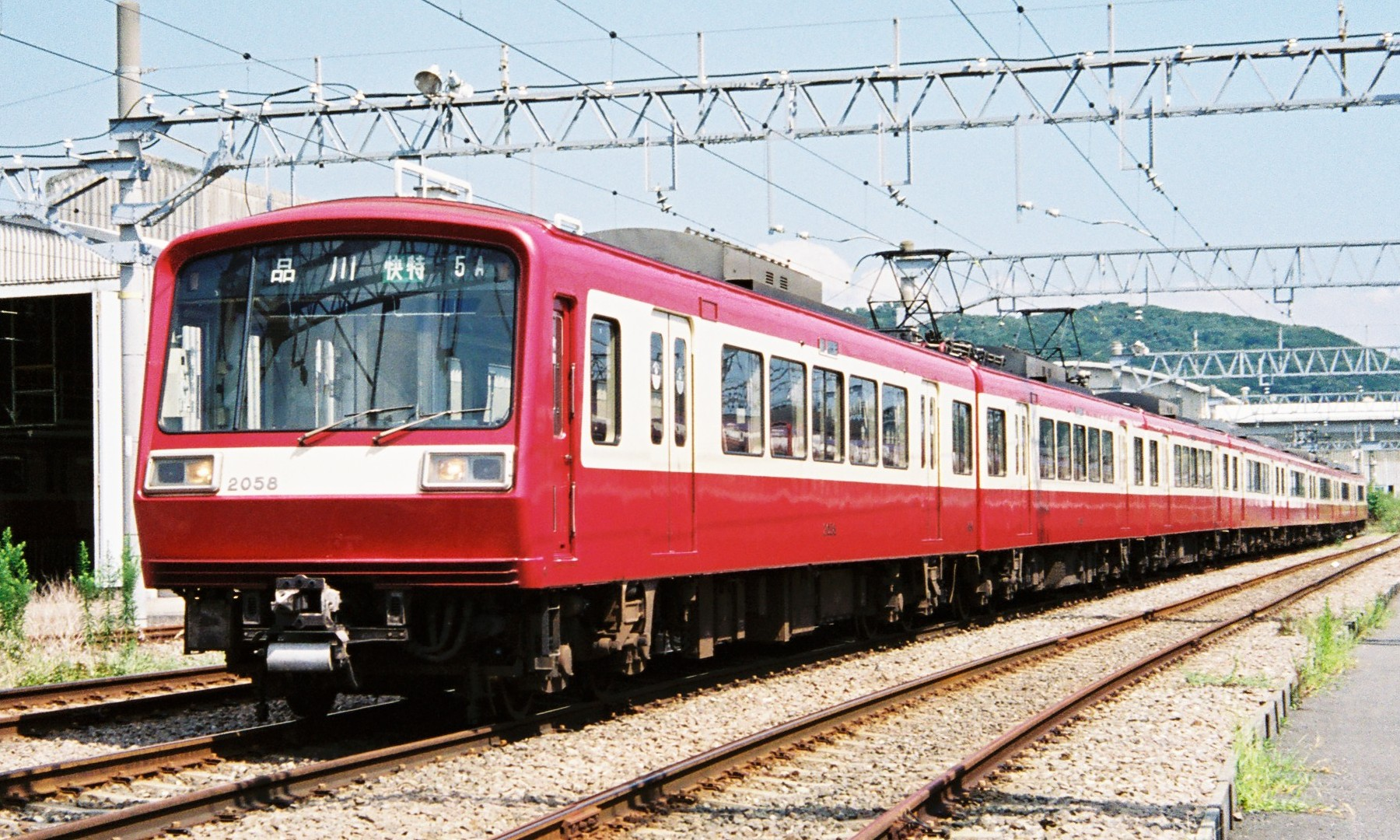
Original livery in August 2000

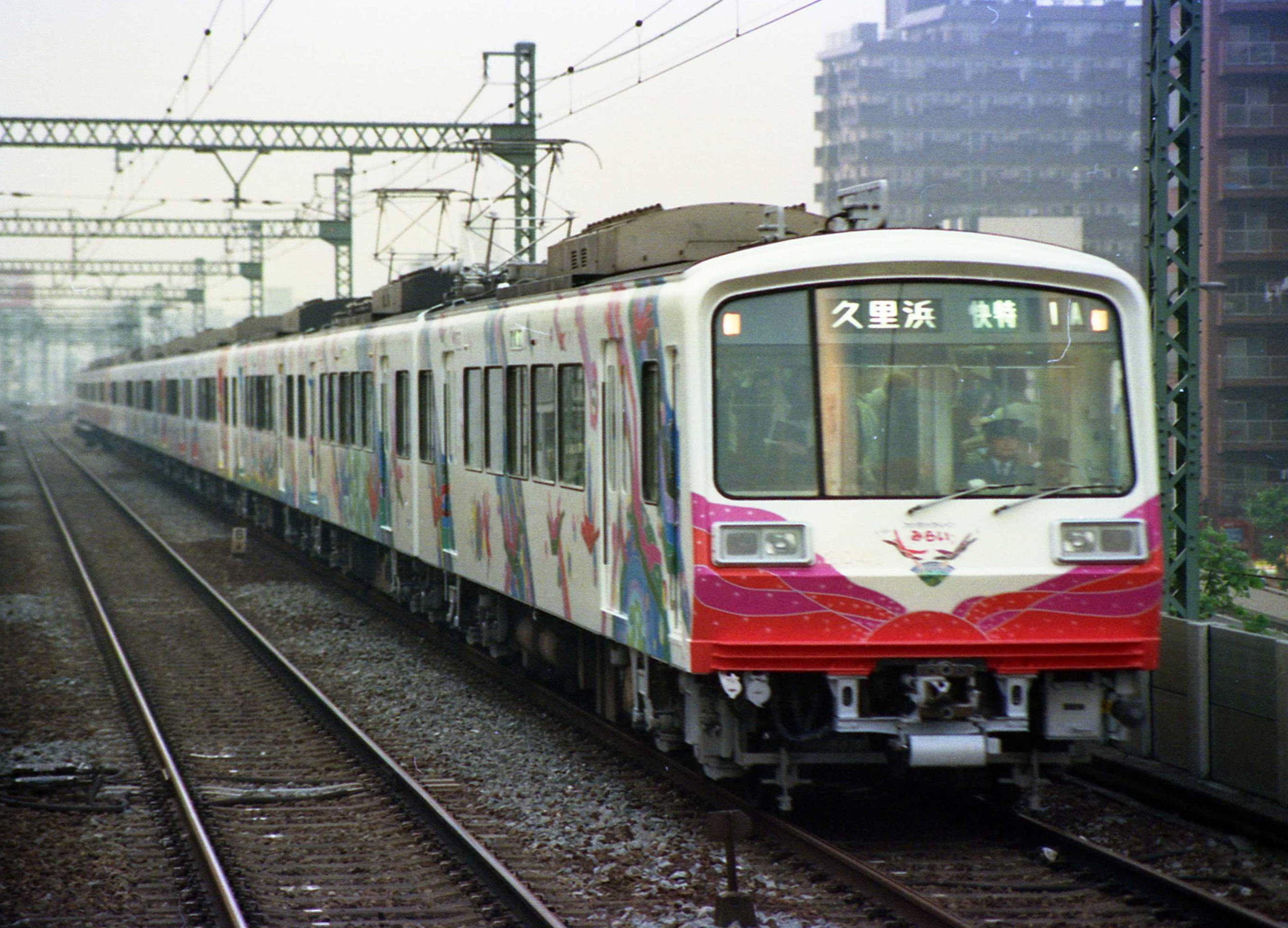
"Mirai" promotional livery in May 1988

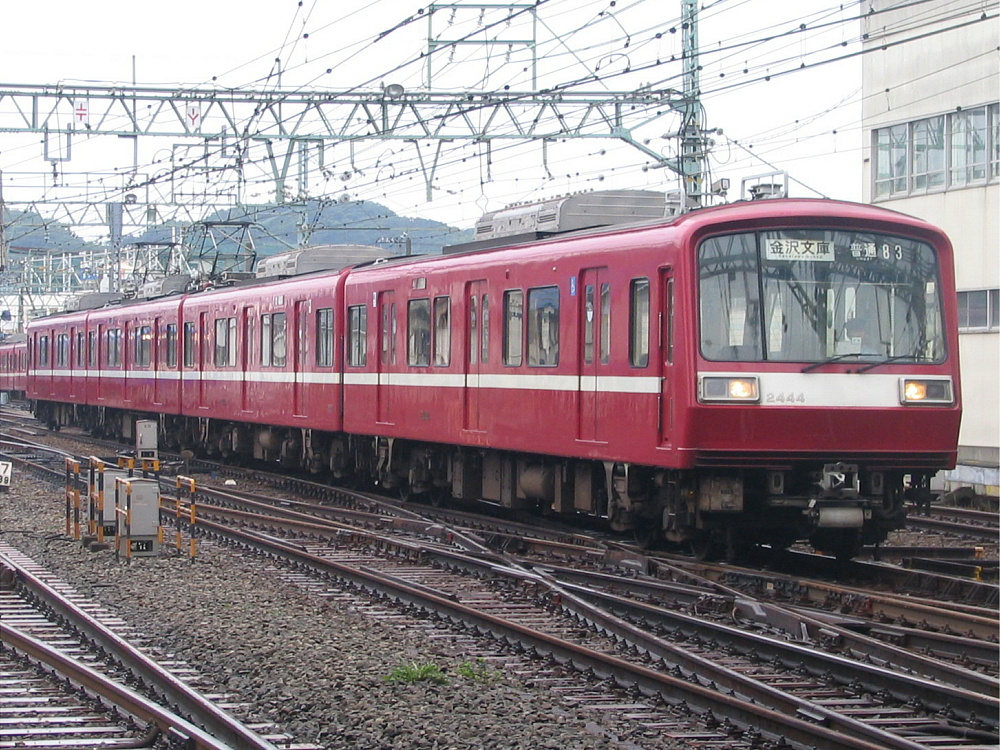
Later commuter style livery in July 2006

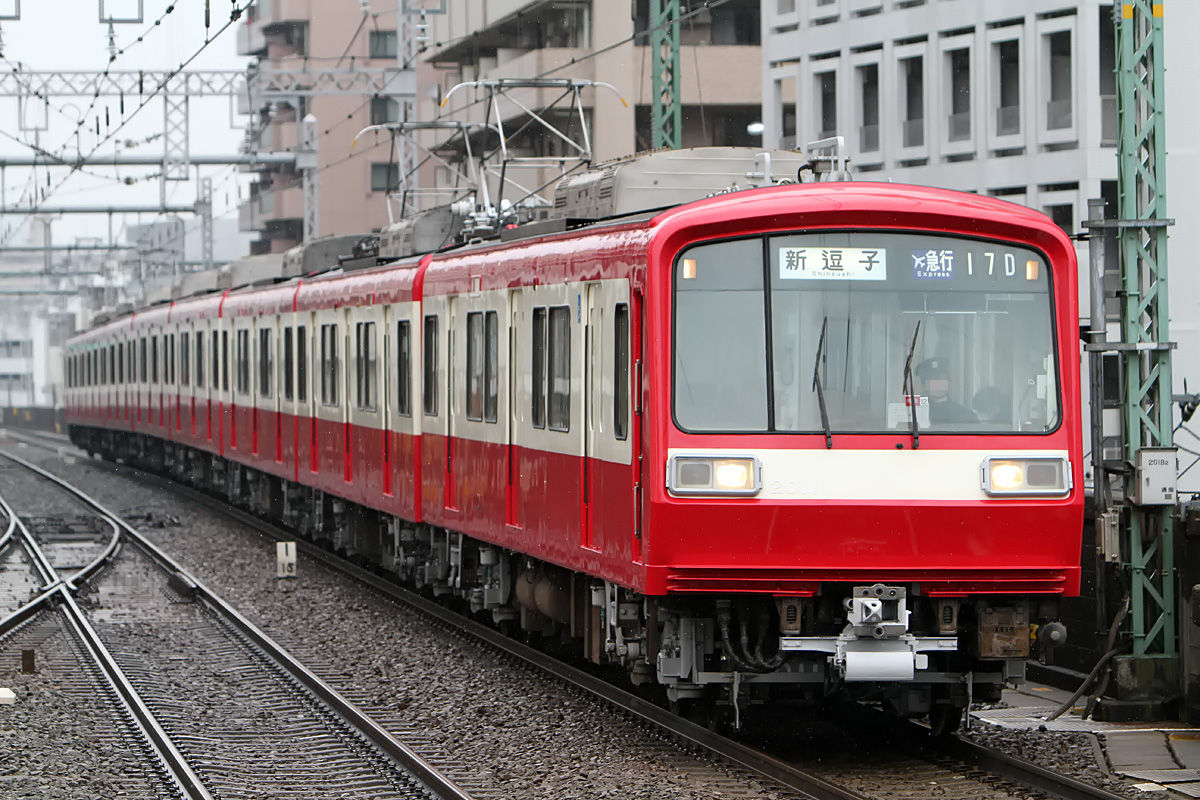
Set 2011 repainted into its original style livery in February 2013

== Interior ==
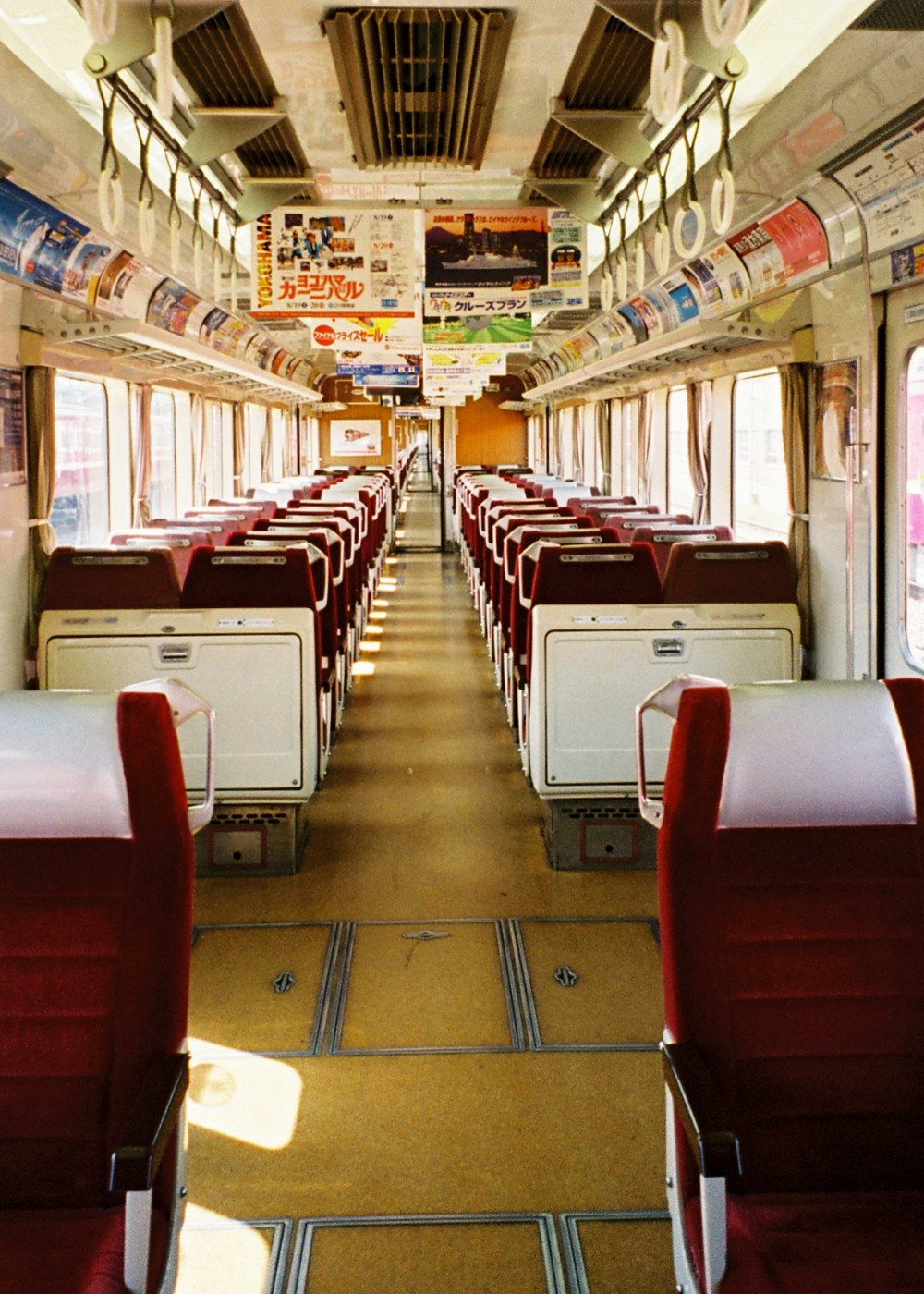
Original 2-door configuration with transverse seating in August 2000

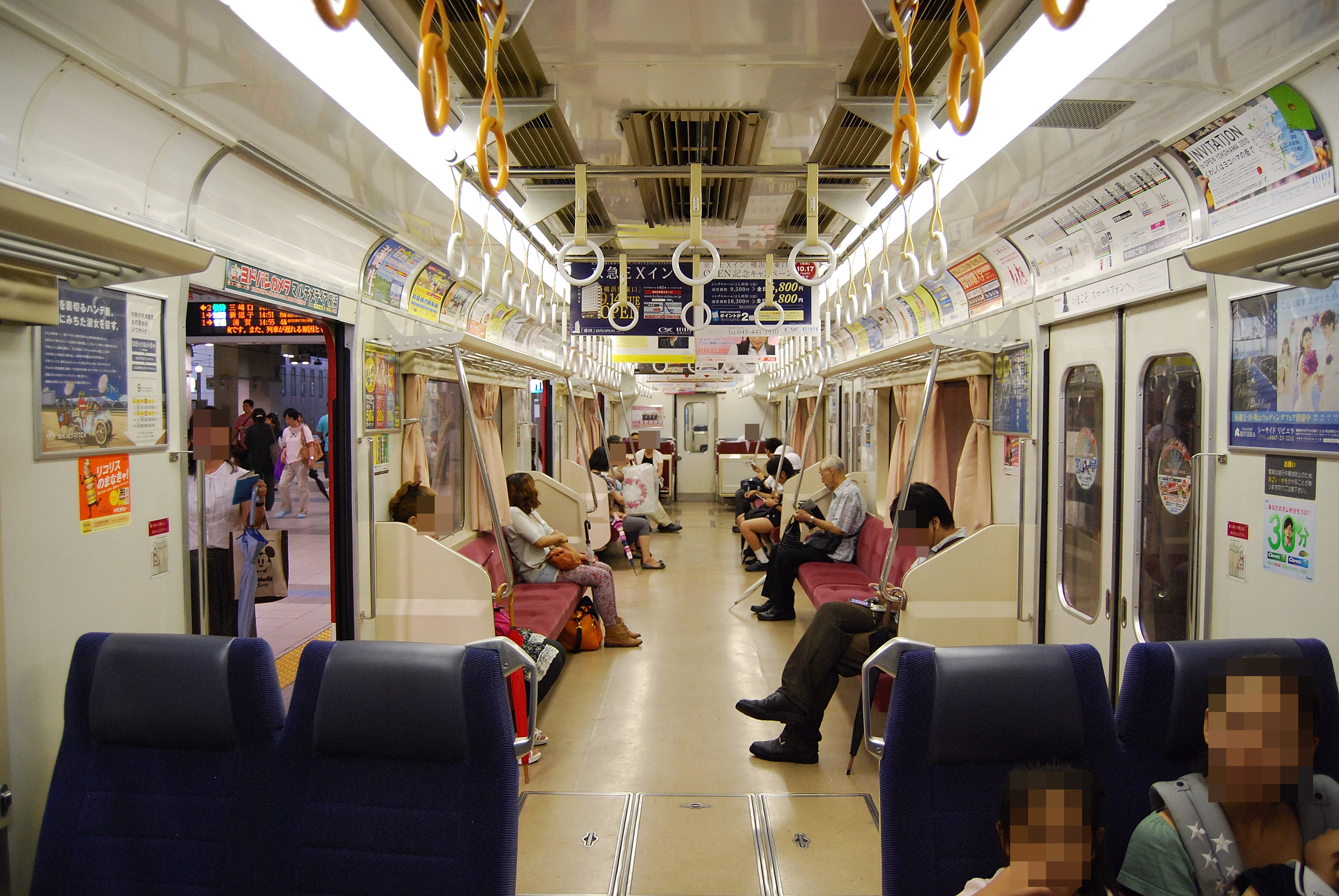
Later 3-door commuter configuration with longitudinal seating in September 2010

== History ==
The 2000 series was awarded the 1983 Blue Ribbon Award, presented annually by the Japan Railfan Club for the most outstanding train design of the year.

=== Withdrawal ===
Withdrawals commenced in 2012, with three of the four-car sets withdrawn in May 2012. Two more four-car sets were withdrawn in March 2016, leaving just set 2451 in service, until it was withdrawn following its last day in service on 11 October 2016.

In 2018, the remaining 2000 series began to be withdrawn, with the last set, set 2011, making its final run on 29 March 2018.
