= Kintetsu 21000 series =

Japanese electric multiple unit train type

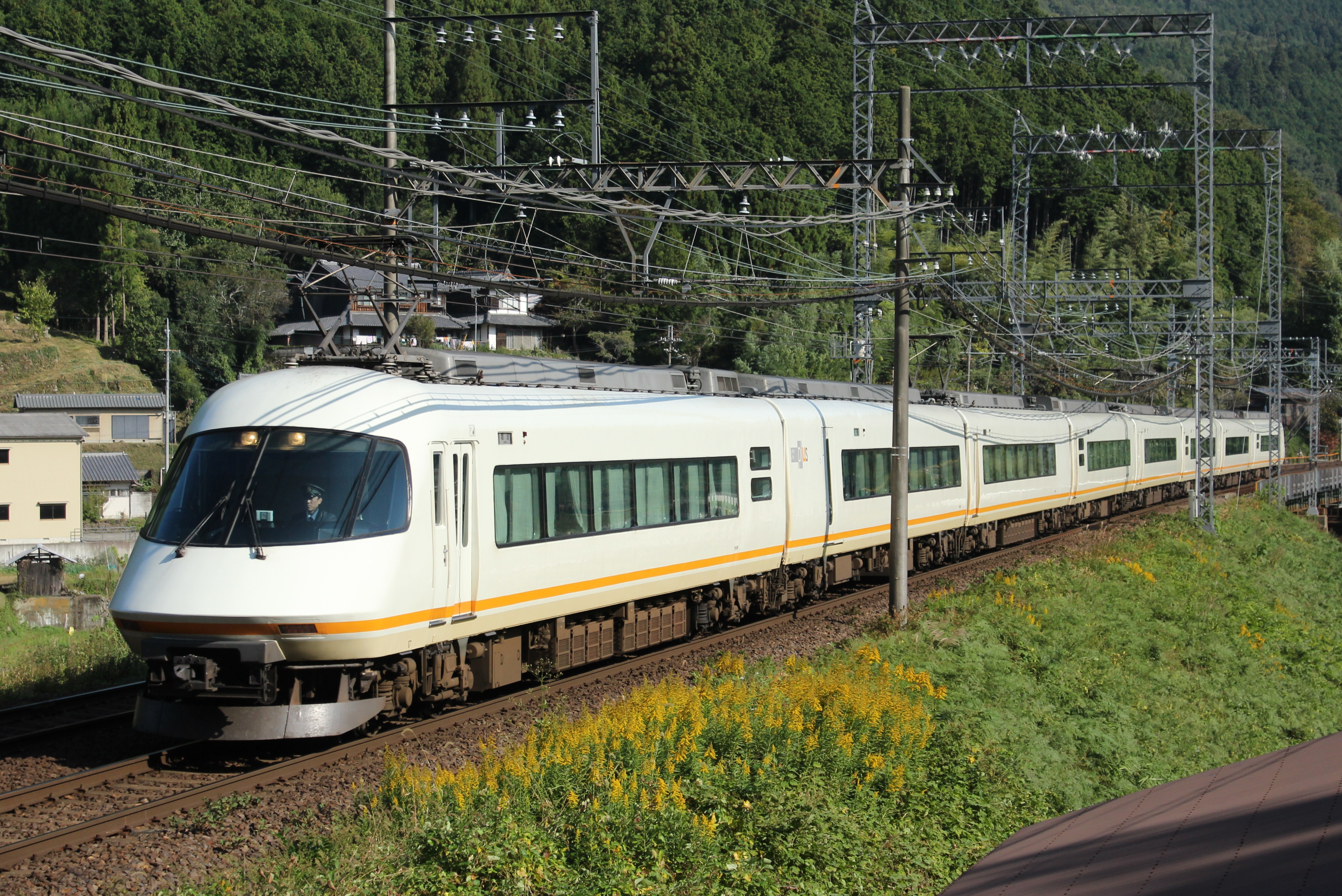
- Kintetsu 21000 series
- In service: 1988 – Present
- Manufacturer: Kinki Sharyo
- Family name: Urban Liner plus
- Entered service: 18 March 1988
- Number built: 72 cars (11 sets)
- Number in service: 72 cars (11 sets)
- Formation: 6 or 8 cars per trainset
- Fleet numbers: UL01 – UL11, UB01 – UB03
- Operators: Kintetsu Railway

Specifications
- Car length: 21,200 mm (69 ft 7 in); 20,500 mm (67 ft 3 in)
- Width: 2,800 mm (9 ft 2 in)
- Height: 4,150 mm (13 ft 7 in); 4,050 mm (13 ft 3 in)
- Electric system(s): 1,500 V DC, overhead lines
- Current collector(s): Pantograph
- Bogies: KD97
- Track gauge: 1,435 mm (4 ft 8 1/2 in)

Notes/references
- This train won the 32nd Blue Ribbon Award in 1989.

The Kintetsu 21000 series (Japanese: 近鉄21000系電車) is a limited express train type operated by Kintetsu Railway. Their nickname is Urban Liner plus. It received the Good Design Award in 1988 and it received the Blue Ribbon Award in 1989.
