= Hanshin 5700 series =

Japanese train type

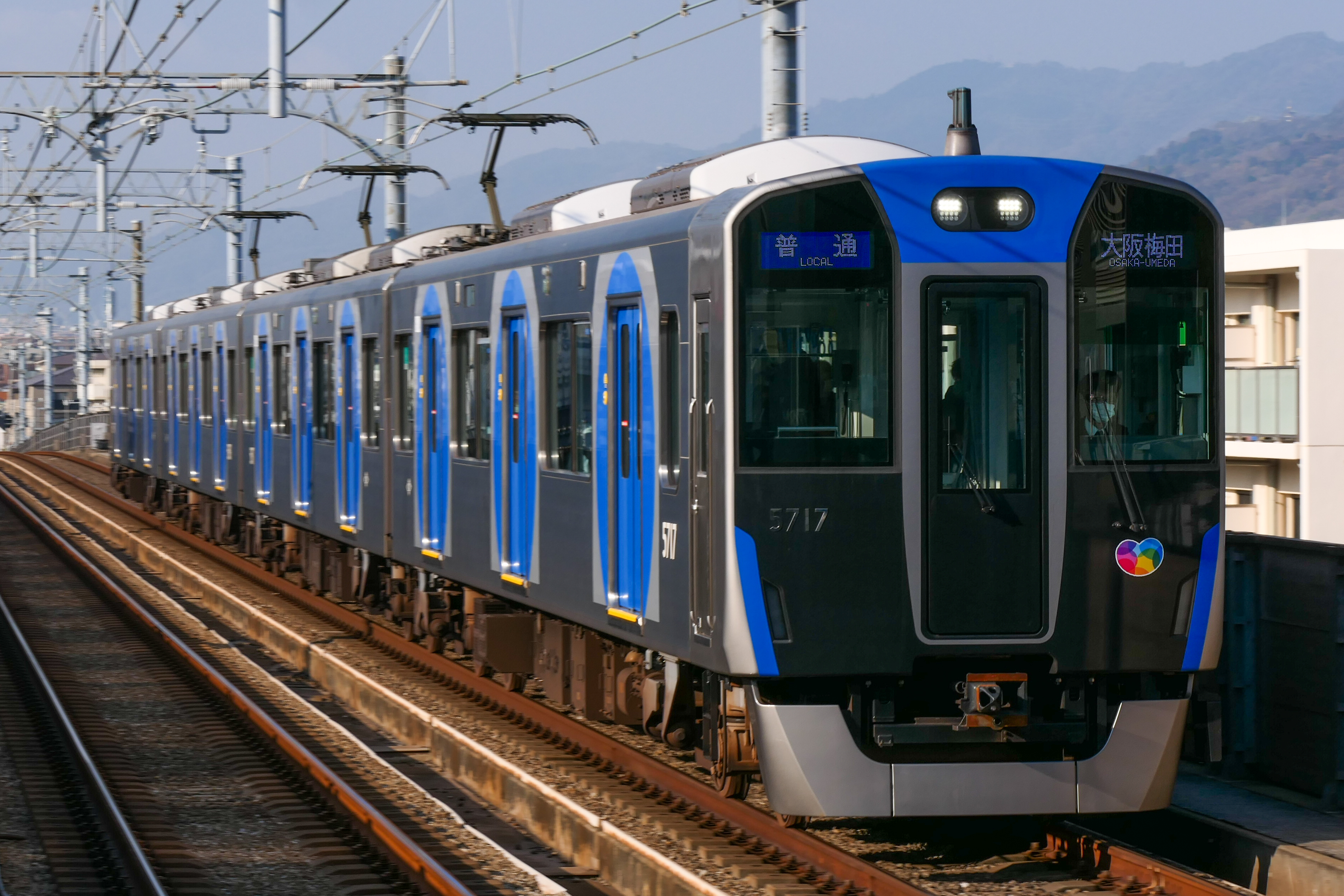
- Set 5717 in service in December 2021
- Manufacturer: Kinki Sharyo
- Built at: Osaka
- Family name: Jet-Silver 5700
- Constructed: 2015–
- Entered service: 24 August 2015
- Number built: 28 vehicles (7 sets)
- Number in service: 28 vehicles (7 sets)
- Formation: 4 cars per trainset
- Fleet numbers: 5701–
- Capacity: 514 (173 seated)
- Operators: Hanshin Electric Railway
- Depots: Amagasaki

Specifications
- Car body construction: Stainless steel
- Car length: 18,800 mm (61 ft 8 in)
- Width: 2,800 mm (9 ft 2 in)
- Height: 4,085 mm (13 ft 4.8 in)
- Doors: 3 pairs per side
- Maximum speed: 110 km/h (68 mph)
- Traction system: Variable frequency (IGBT)
- Traction motors: Permanent-magnet synchronous motor
- Acceleration: 4.0 km/(h⋅s) (2.5 mph/s)
- Deceleration: 4.5 km/(h⋅s) (2.8 mph/s)
- Electric system(s): 1,500 V DC
- Current collection: Overhead catenary
- Track gauge: 1,435 mm (4 ft 8 1/2 in)

Notes/references
- This train won the 59th Blue Ribbon Award in 2016.

The Hanshin 5700 series (阪神電鉄5700系) is a commuter electric multiple unit (EMU) train type operated by the private railway operator Hanshin Electric Railway in Japan since August 2015.

== Design ==
The trains feature passenger-operated door buttons, unusual in the Kansai region.

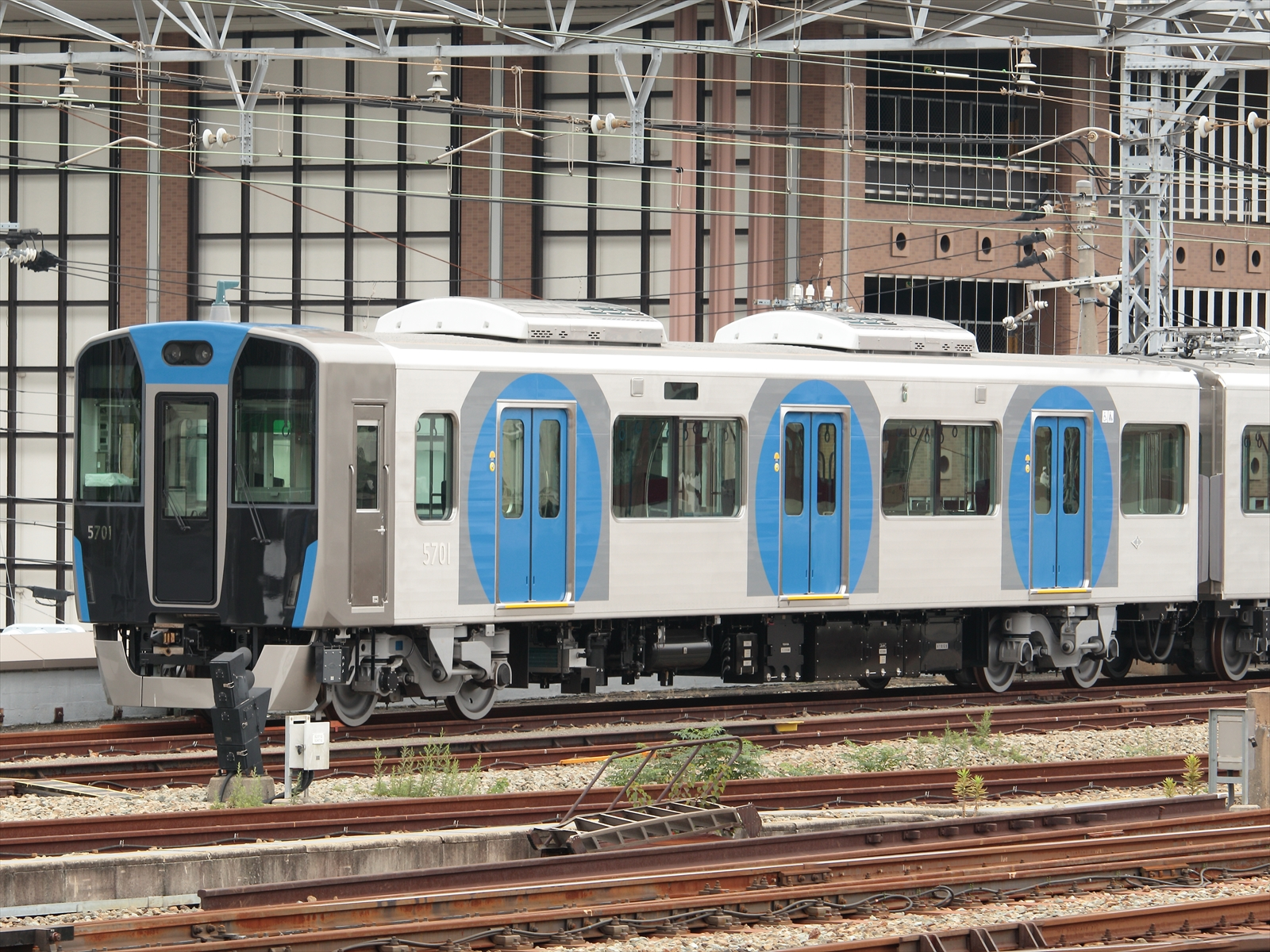
Set 5701 in July 2015

== Formation ==
As of 1 April 2016, one four-car set is in service. Trains are formed as four-car sets, as shown below, with all cars motored, although only one bogie on each of the end cars is motored.

Car No.	1	2	3	4
Designation	Mc1	M1	M2	Mc2
Numbering	570x (odd)	580x (odd)	580x (even)	570x (even)
Designation	Mc1	M1	M2	Mc2
Weight (t)	34.0	37.0	37.0	34.0
Capacity (total/seated)	124/41	133/46	133/45	124/41

The M1 car has two single-arm pantographs, and the M2 car has one.

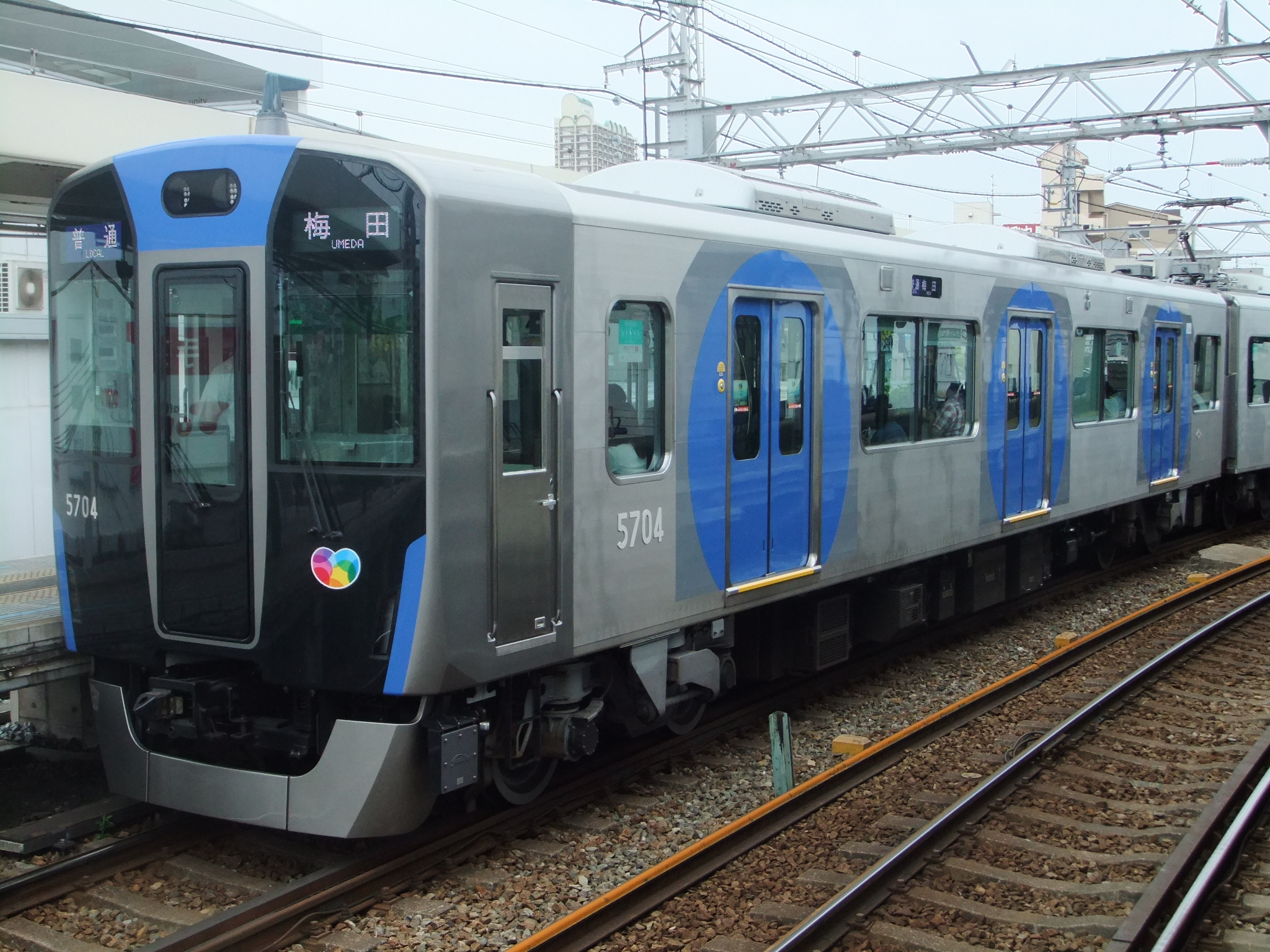
Mc2 car 5704 of set 5703 in May 2017

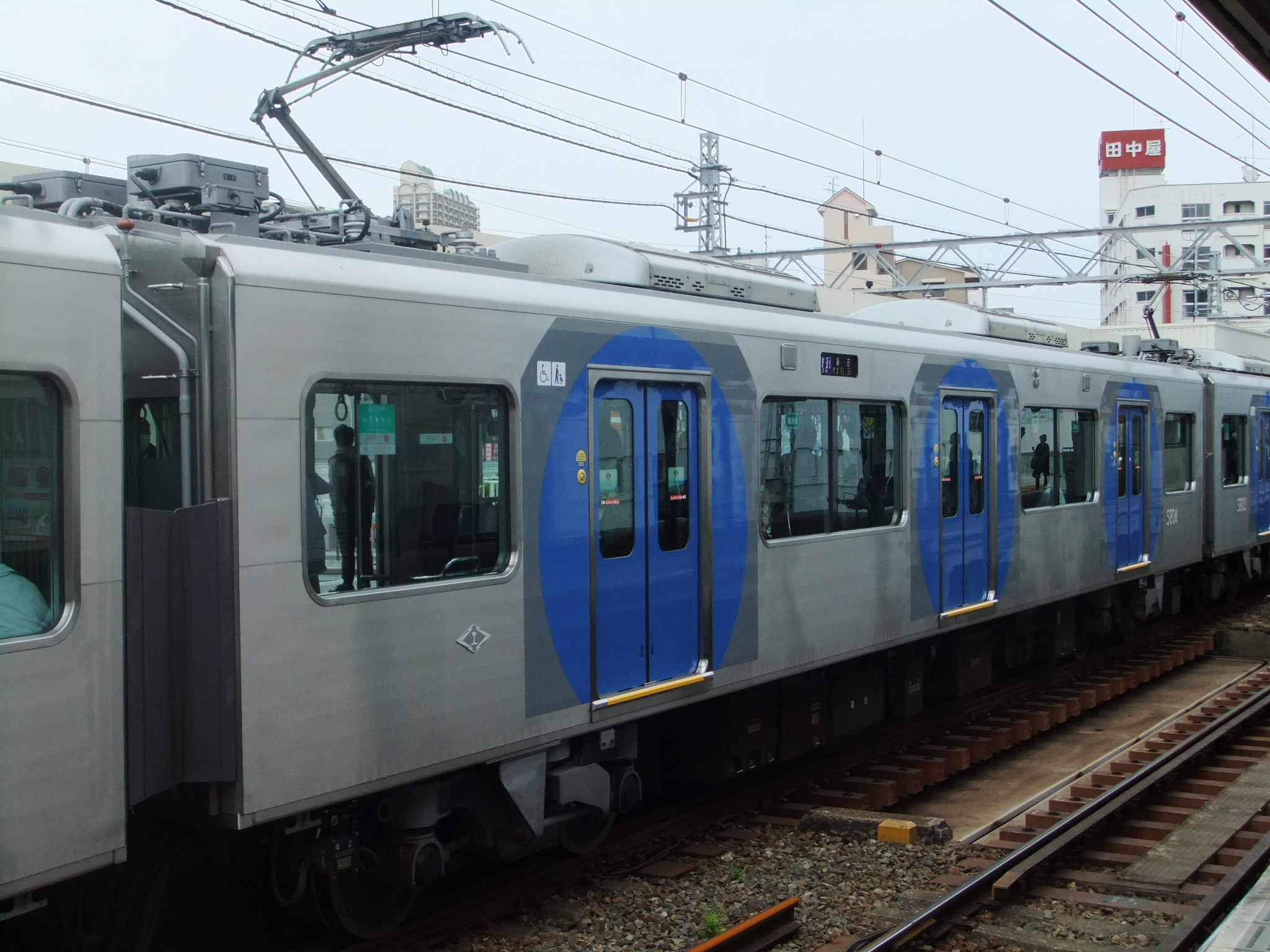
M2 car 5804 of set 5703 in May 2017

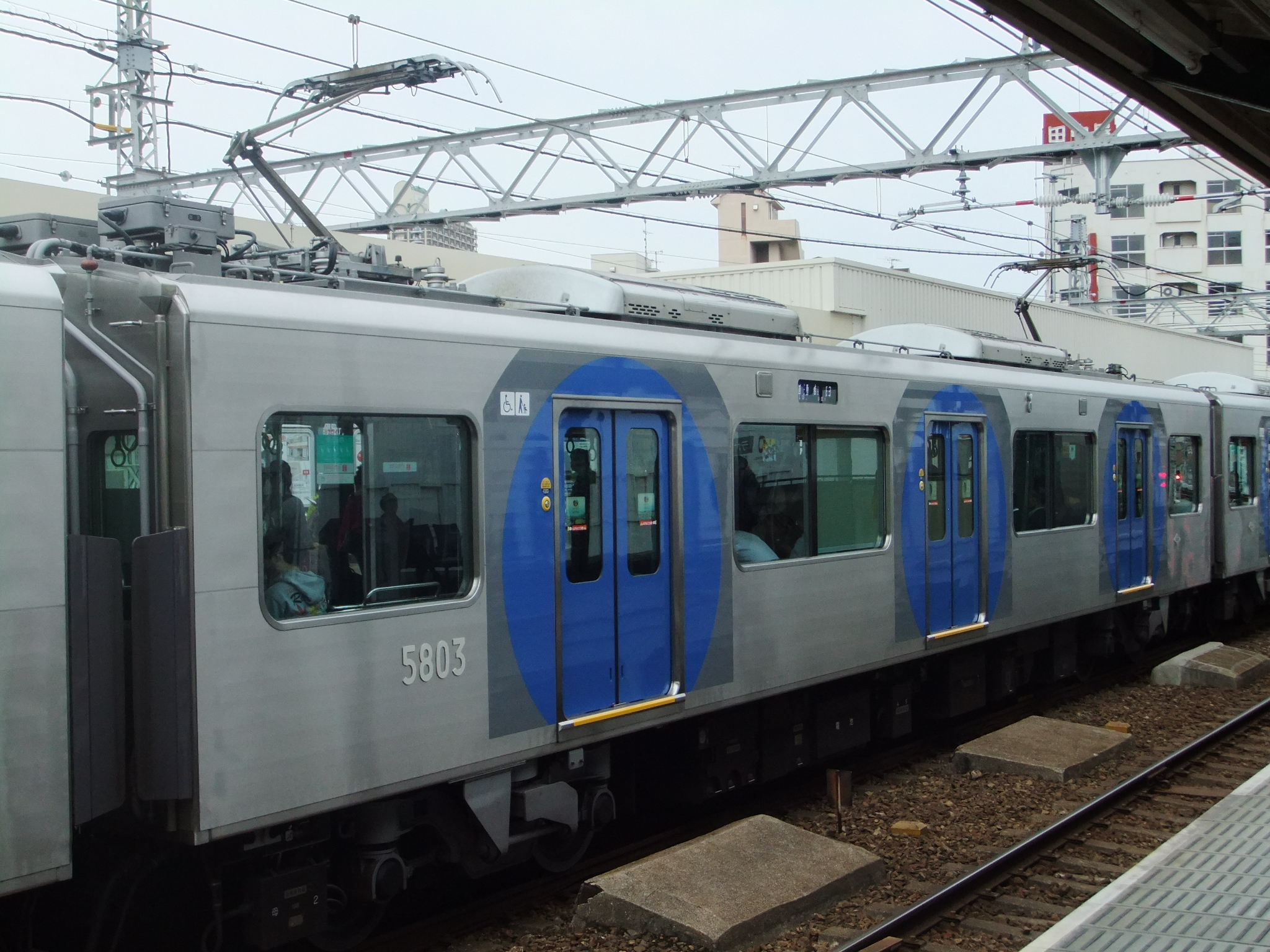
M1 car 5803 of set 5703 in May 2017

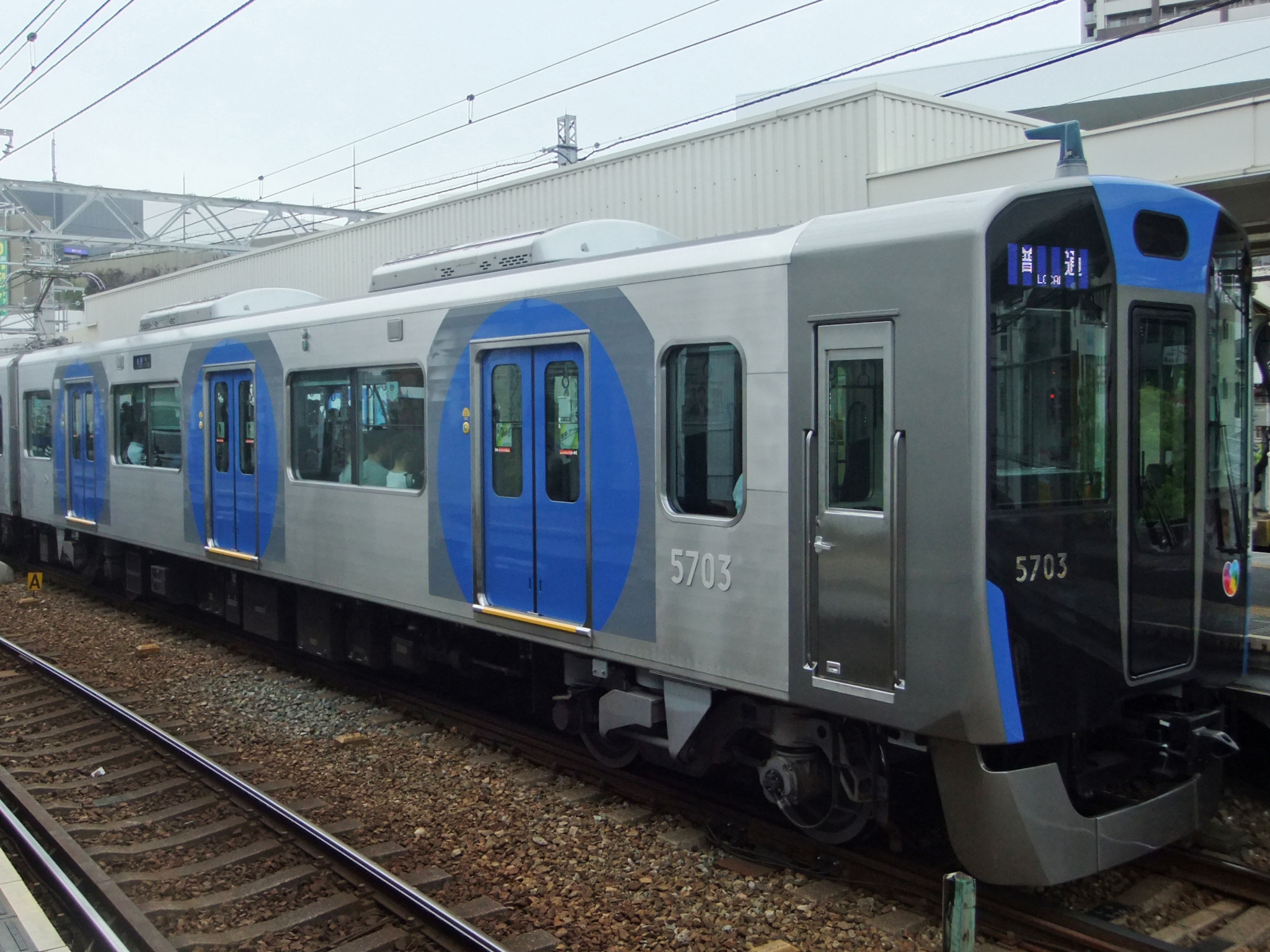
Mc1 car 5703 of set 5703 in May 2017

== Interior ==
Passenger accommodation consists of longitudinal bench seating throughout. Regular seating areas use blue moquette seat covers and grab handles, and priority seating areas use green seat covers and grab handles. LED lighting is used in the interiors, and 32-inch half-height LCD passenger information screens are provided above three out of six doorways per car, with information provided in four languages: Japanese, English, Chinese, and Korean.

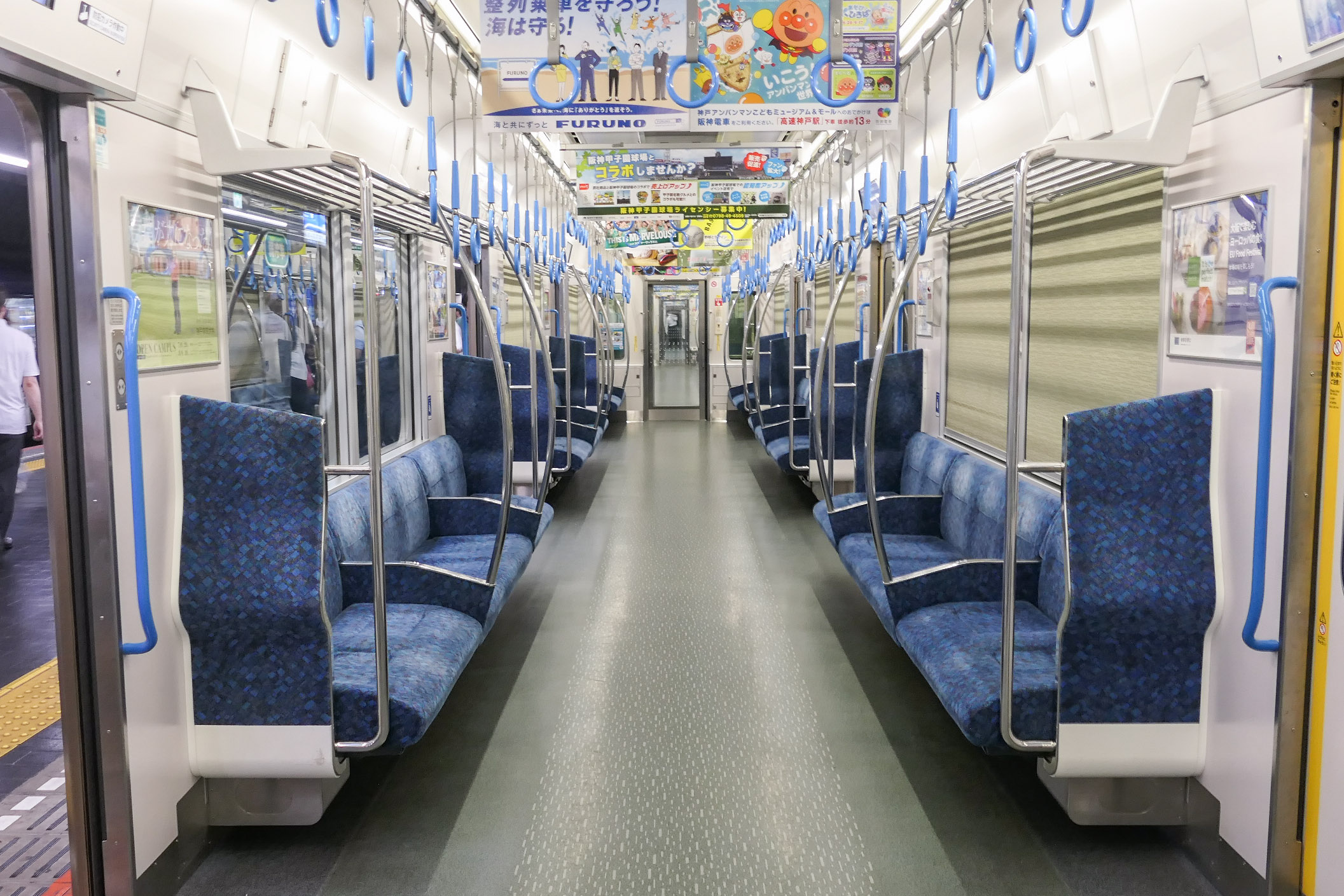
Interior view

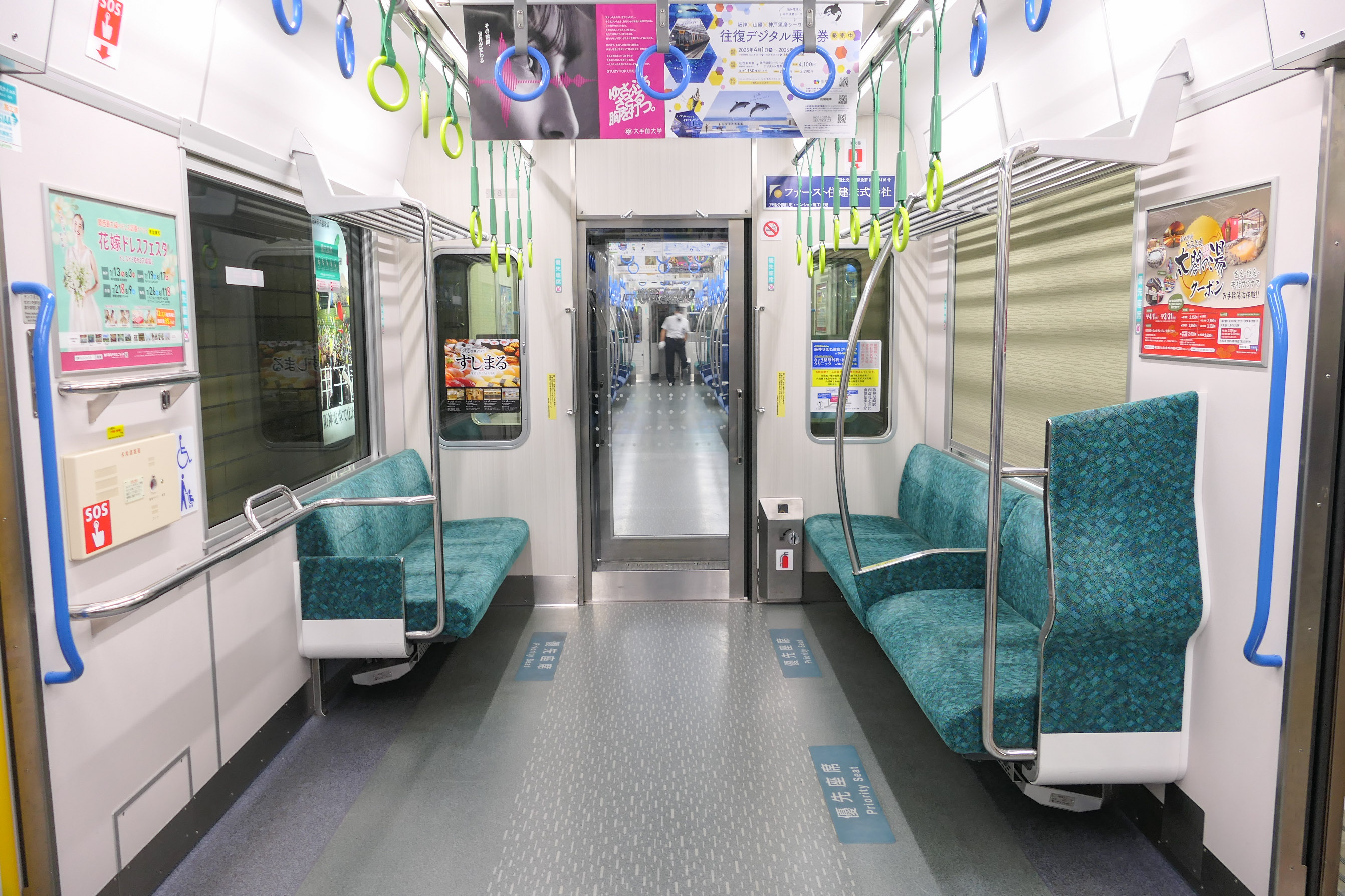
Priority seating with wheelchair space

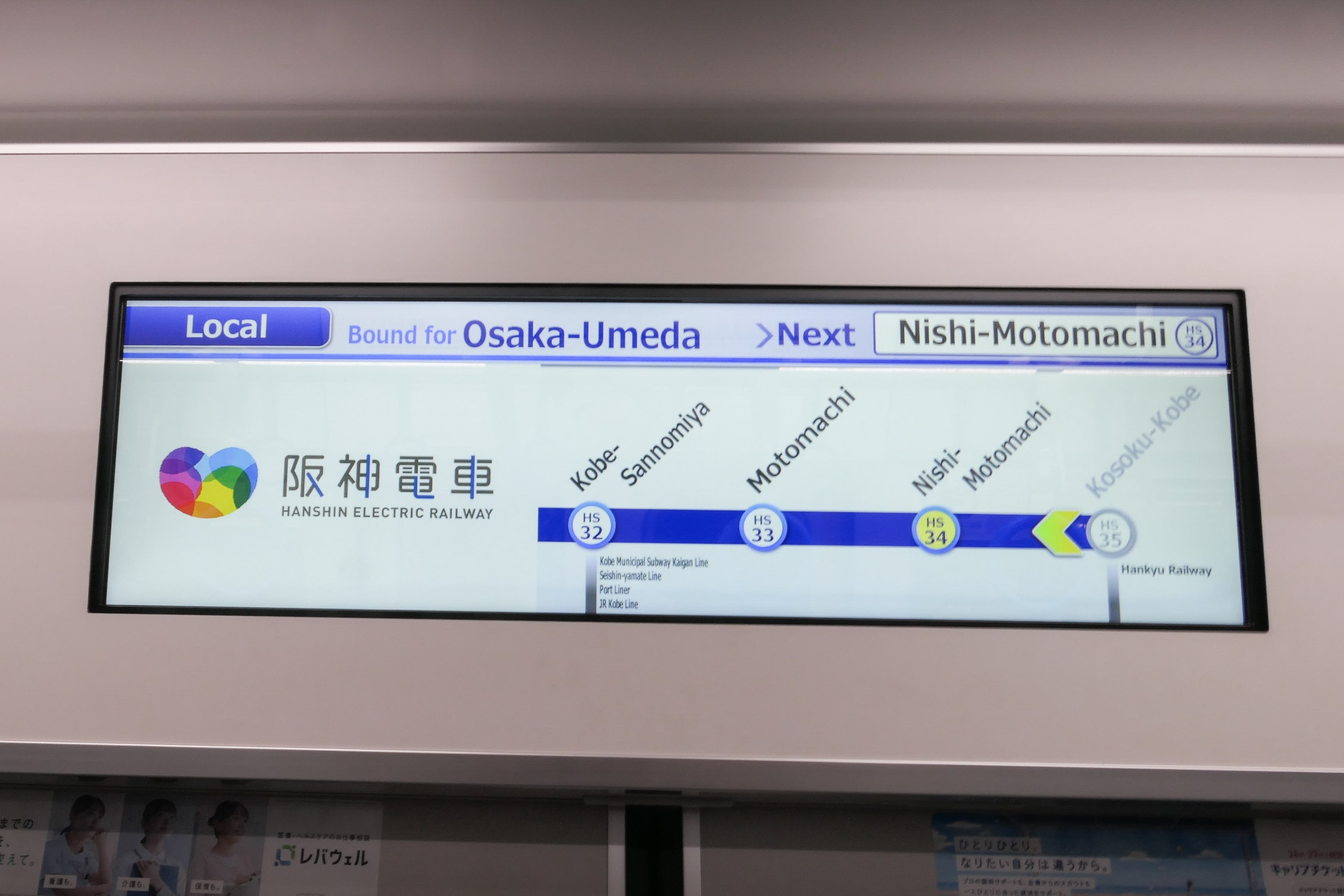
LCD information screen

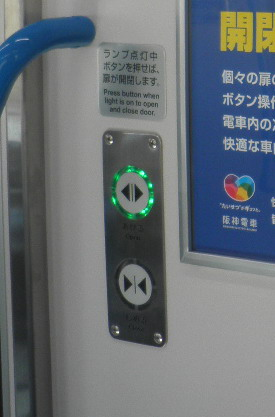
Door button

== History ==
Details of the new trains were officially announced in March 2015. The first set delivered, 5701, entered revenue service from 24 August 2015.

In May 2016, the 5700 series was awarded the 2016 Blue Ribbon Award, presented annually by the Japan Railfan Club. A presentation ceremony was held at Koshien Station on 2 October 2016.

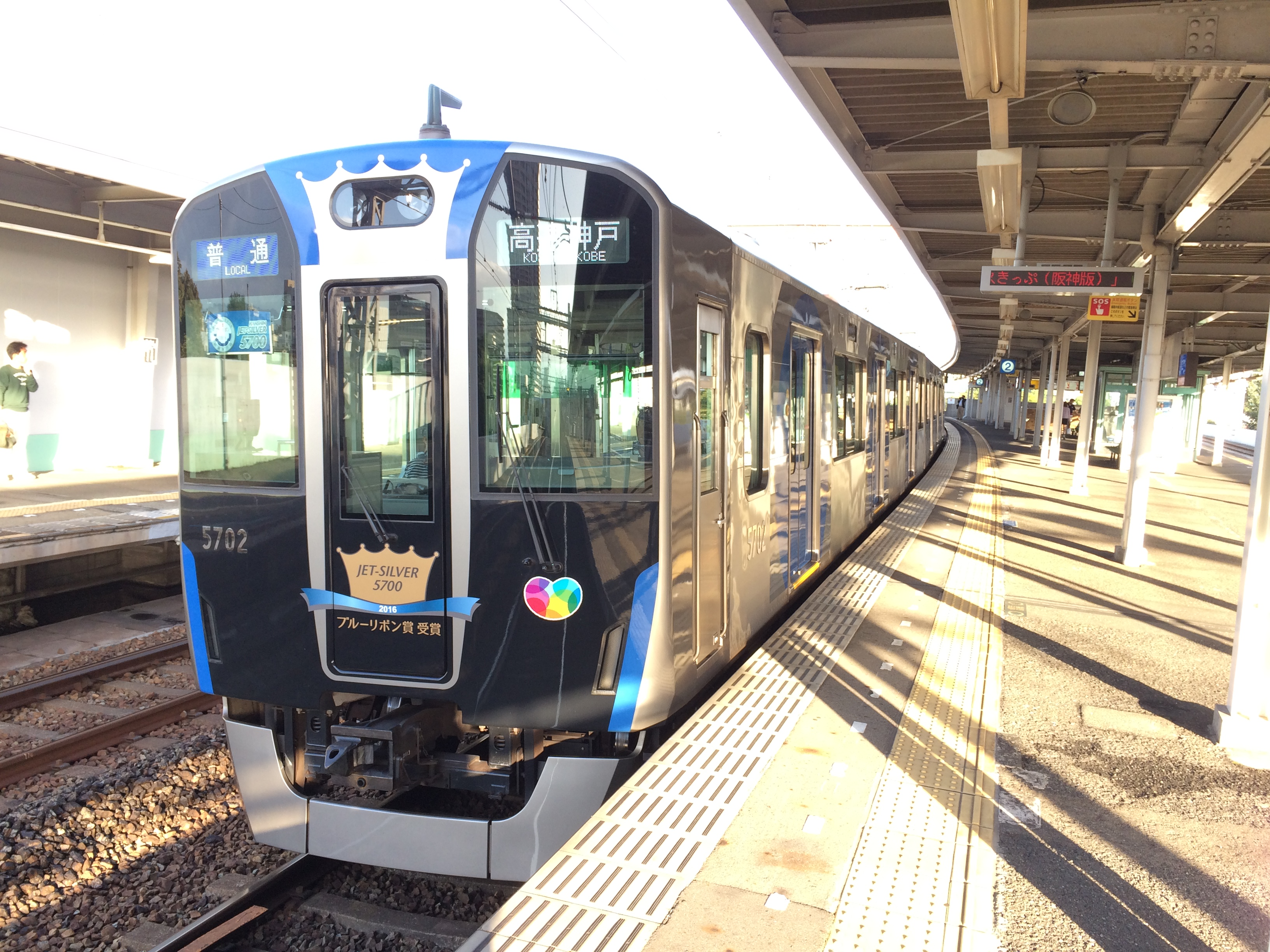
Set 5701 in October 2016 with special vinyls on the front end marking the receipt of the 2016 Blue Ribbon Award

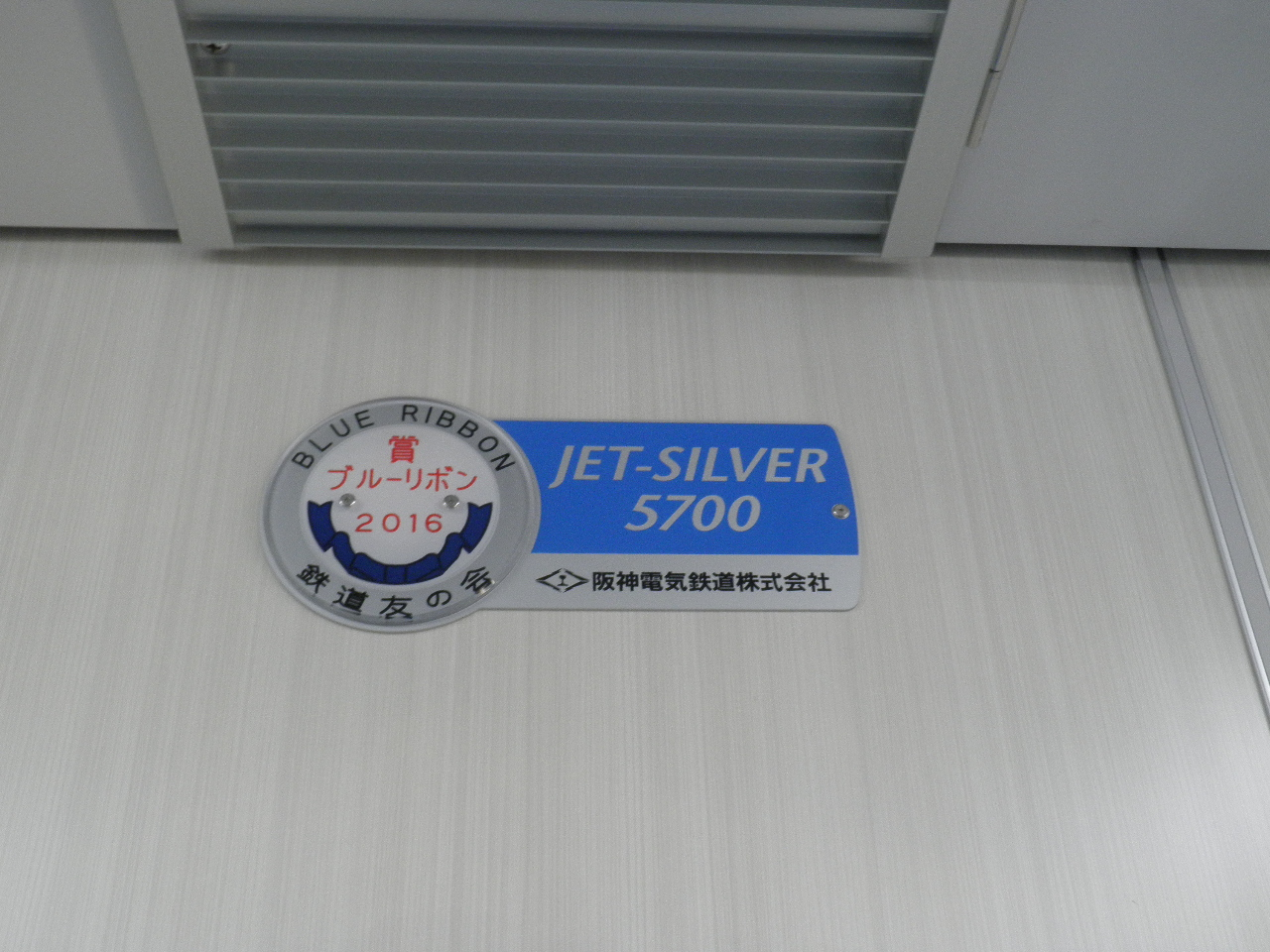
A plate inside set 5701 marking the receipt of the 2016 Blue Ribbon Award

A second set was delivered from Kinki Sharyo in March 2017.

=== Fleet/build details ===
The individual build histories for the fleet are as follows.

Set No.	Date delivered
5701	25 June 2015
5703	21 March 2017
5705	15 June 2017
5707	11 July 2017
5709	22 March 2019
5711	19 December 2019
5713	3 February 2020
