= Hakone Tozan 3100 series =

Japanese electric multiple unit train type operated since 2017

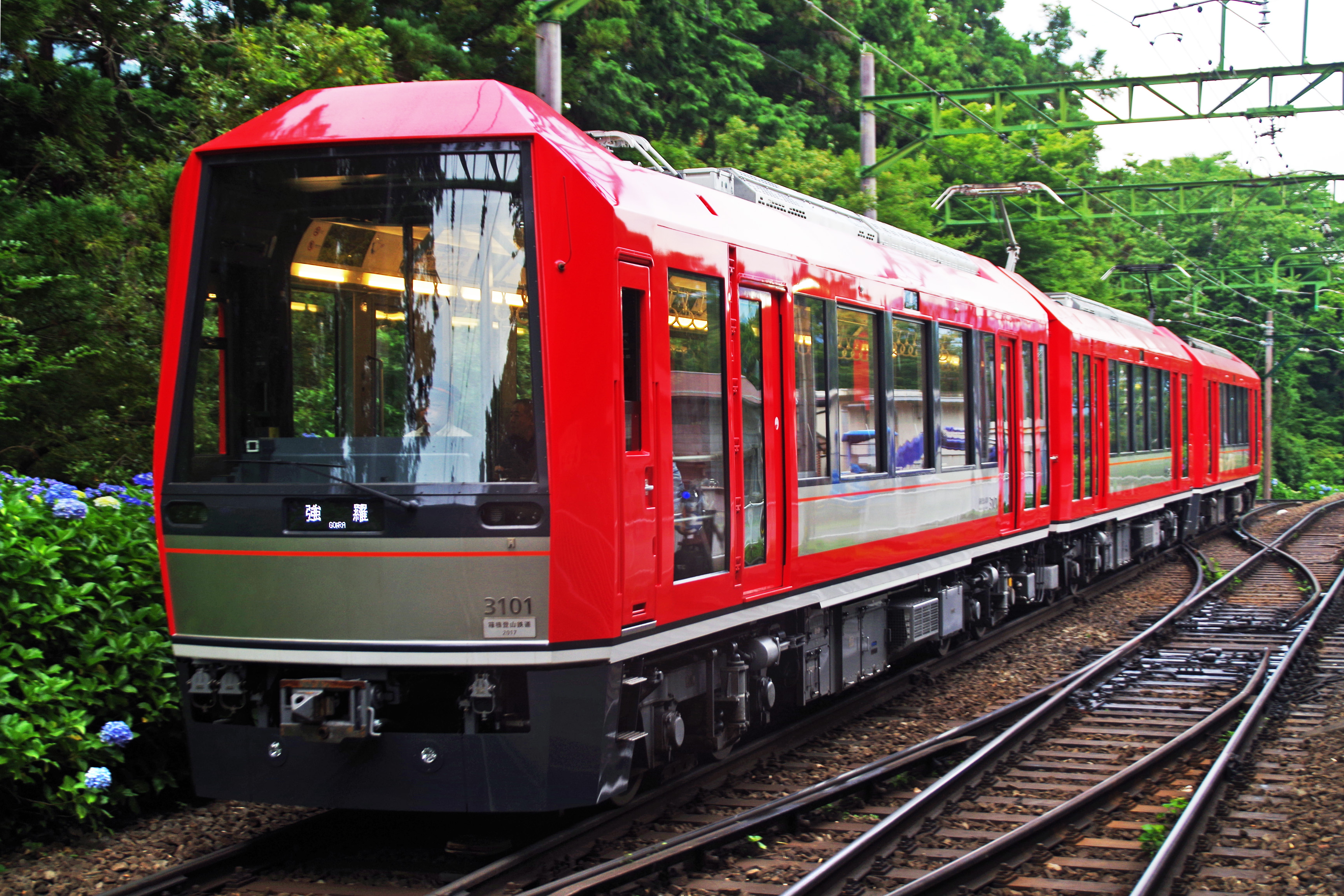
- Set 3101 running with a 3000 series car in July 2017
- Manufacturer: Kawasaki Heavy Industries
- Built at: Kobe, Hyogo
- Family name: Allegra
- Constructed: 2017, 2020
- Entered service: 15 May 2017
- Number built: 4 vehicles (2 sets)
- Formation: 2 cars per set
- Capacity: 164 (80 seated)
- Operator: Hakone Tozan Railway
- Line served: Hakone Tozan Line

Specifications
- Car body construction: Stainless steel
- Car length: 14,600 mm (47 ft 11 in)
- Width: 2,568 mm (8 ft 5.1 in)
- Height: 3,961 mm (12 ft 11.9 in)
- Floor height: 2,350 mm (7 ft 9 in)
- Doors: 2 per side
- Maximum speed: 55 km/h (34 mph)
- Traction system: 3-phase squirrel-cage induction motors
- Power output: 55 kW x 4 per car
- Acceleration: 4.0 km/(h⋅s) (2.5 mph/s)
- Deceleration: 4.0 km/(h⋅s) (2.5 mph/s) (service); 4.5 km/(h⋅s) (2.8 mph/s) (emergency)
- Electric system: 750/1,500 V DC overhead line
- Current collection: single-arm pantograph
- Bogies: TS-330C
- Braking system: Track brake
- Multiple working: 3000 series
- Track gauge: 1,435 mm (4 ft 8 1/2 in)

The Hakone Tozan 3100 series (箱根登山鉄道3100形) is a two-car electric multiple unit (EMU) train type operated by the Japanese private railway operator Hakone Tozan Railway on its steeply graded Hakone Tozan Line since May 2017.

== Overview ==
The fleet is branded "Allegra". The general design of the trains was overseen by Noriaki Okabe Architecture Network, with the train finished in the standard Hakone Tozan Railway livery of "Vermillion Hakone" and silver highlights. The trains can operate in multiple with 3000 series EMU cars to form three-car sets.

== Formation ==
The two car set is formed as follows.

Numbering	KuMoHa 3100	KuMoHa 3100
Weight (t)	35.0	35.0
Capacity (seated/total)	40/82	40/82

== Interior ==
Passenger accommodation consists mostly of four-person seating bays, with a wheelchair spaces in both cars. Seating is provided for 40 passengers in each car, including six pairs of tip-up seats. The trains use LED lighting throughout.

== History ==
Hakone Tozan Railway announced details of the new 3100 series train in December 2016, scheduled to enter service in May 2017. The first unit was delivered from Kawasaki Heavy Industries in Kobe in April 2017. The two-car train entered revenue service on 15 May 2017. A second train was delivered from Kawasaki Heavy Industries in October 2020.
