= Yoshirō =

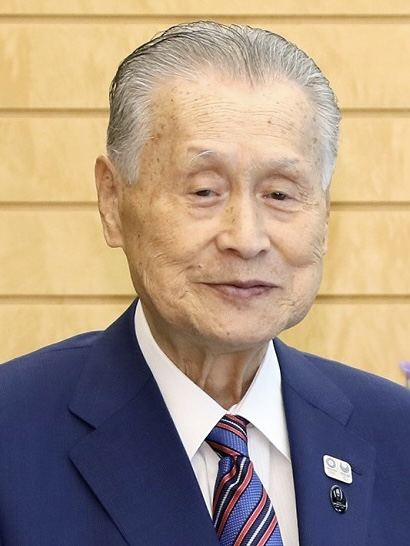
- Yoshiro Mori, Japanese politician
- Gender: Male

Origin
- Origin: Japanese
- Meaning: Different meanings depending on the kanji used

Other names
- Alternative spelling: Yosiro (Kunrei-shiki) Yosiro (Nihon-shiki) Yoshirō, Yoshiro, Yoshirou (Hepburn)

Yoshirō, Yoshiro or Yoshirou is a masculine Japanese given name.

== Written forms ==
Yoshirō can be written using different combinations of kanji characters. Here are some examples:

- 義郎, "justice, son"
- 義朗, "justice, clear"
- 吉郎, "good luck, son"
- 吉朗, "good luck, clear"
- 夜白, "night's light"
- 善郎, "virtuous, son"
- 善朗, "virtuous, clear"
- 芳郎, "fragrant/virtuous, son"
- 芳朗, "fragrant/virtuous, clear"
- 好郎, "good/like something, son"
- 喜郎, "rejoice, son"
- 喜朗, "rejoice, clear"
- 慶郎, "congratulate, son"
- 嘉郎, "excellent, son"
- 嘉朗, "excellent, clear"
- 与志郎, "give, determination, son"
- 与四郎, "give, 4, son"

The name can also be written in hiragana よしろう or katakana ヨシロウ.

== Notable people with the name ==
- Yoshiro Abe (阿部 吉朗; born 1980), Japanese footballer
- Yoshiro Asakuma (朝隈 善郎; 1914–2008), Japanese high jumper
- Yoshiro Hayashi (golfer) (林 由郎; 1922–2012), Japanese golfer
- Yoshiro Hayashi (politician) (林 義郎; 1927–2017), Japanese politician
- Yoshiro Irino (入野 義朗; 1921–1980), Japanese composer
- Yoshiro Kataoka (片岡 義朗; born 1945), Japanese anime producer
- Yoshiro Maeda (前田 吉朗; born 1981), Japanese mixed martial artist
- Yoshiro Mori (森 喜朗; born 1937), Japanese politician
- Yoshiro Moriyama (森山 佳郎; born 1967), Japanese footballer
- Yoshiro Muraki (村木 与四郎; 1924–2009), Japanese costume designer and art director
- Yoshiro Nagayo (長与 善郎; 1888–1961), Japanese playwright and writer
- Yoshiro Nakamatsu (中松 義郎; born 1928), Japanese inventor
- Yoshiro Nakamura (中村 祥朗; born 1979), Japanese footballer
- Yoshiro Noda (野田 芳郎; born 1936), Japanese swimmer
- Yoshiro Okabe (岡部 芳郎; 1884–1945), Japanese engineer
- Yoshiro Okamoto (岡本 芳郎; born 1943), Japanese politician
- Yoshiro Okanoyama (岡ノ山 喜郎; born 1935), Japanese sumo wrestler
- Yoshiro Sonoda (園田 裕四郎; born 1932), Japanese long jumper
- Yoshiro Taniguchi (谷口 吉郎; 1904–1979), Japanese architect
- Yoshiro Yokomine (横峯 良郎; born 1960), Japanese politician
- Yoshirō (ヨシロウ), a member of the Japanese band Funkist
