= Habia =

Habia may refer to:

- Habia (bird), a bird genus
- Habia (root), the hydronymic word root
