= Okabe (surname) =

Okabe (written: 岡部) is a Japanese surname. Notable people with the surname include:

- Jiro Okabe (岡部 次郎; 1864–1925), Japanese politician
- Keiichi Okabe (岡部 啓一; born 1969), Japanese music composer
- Kenji Okabe (岡部 健二; 1915–?), Japanese World War II flying ace
- Kinjiro Okabe (岡部 金治郎; 1896–1984), Japanese electrical engineer and scientist
- Kiyoko Okabe (岡部 喜代子; born 1949), Japanese judge
- Okabe Motonobu (岡部 元信; died 1581), Japanese samurai
- Naozaburo Okabe (岡部 直三郎; 1887–1946), Japanese general
- Noriaki Okabe (岡部 憲明; born 1947), Japanese architect
- Rin Okabe (岡部麟; born 1996), Japanese singer
- Toru Okabe (岡部 通; 1889–1961), Japanese general
- Yoshiro Okabe (岡部 芳郎; 1884–1945), Japanese engineer and assistant of Thomas Edison
- Yukiaki Okabe (岡部 幸明; 1941–2018), Japanese swimmer

== Fictional characters ==
- Keiko Okabe, a character in the novel Hotel on the Corner of Bitter and Sweet
- Rintarō Okabe (岡部 倫太郎), protagonist of the visual novel Steins;Gate
