= 70000 series =

70000 series may refer to the Japanese trains:

- Odakyu 70000 series GSE
- Tobu 70000 series
- TWR 70-000 series
