= Hakone Tozan 3000 series =

Japanese electric multiple unit train type

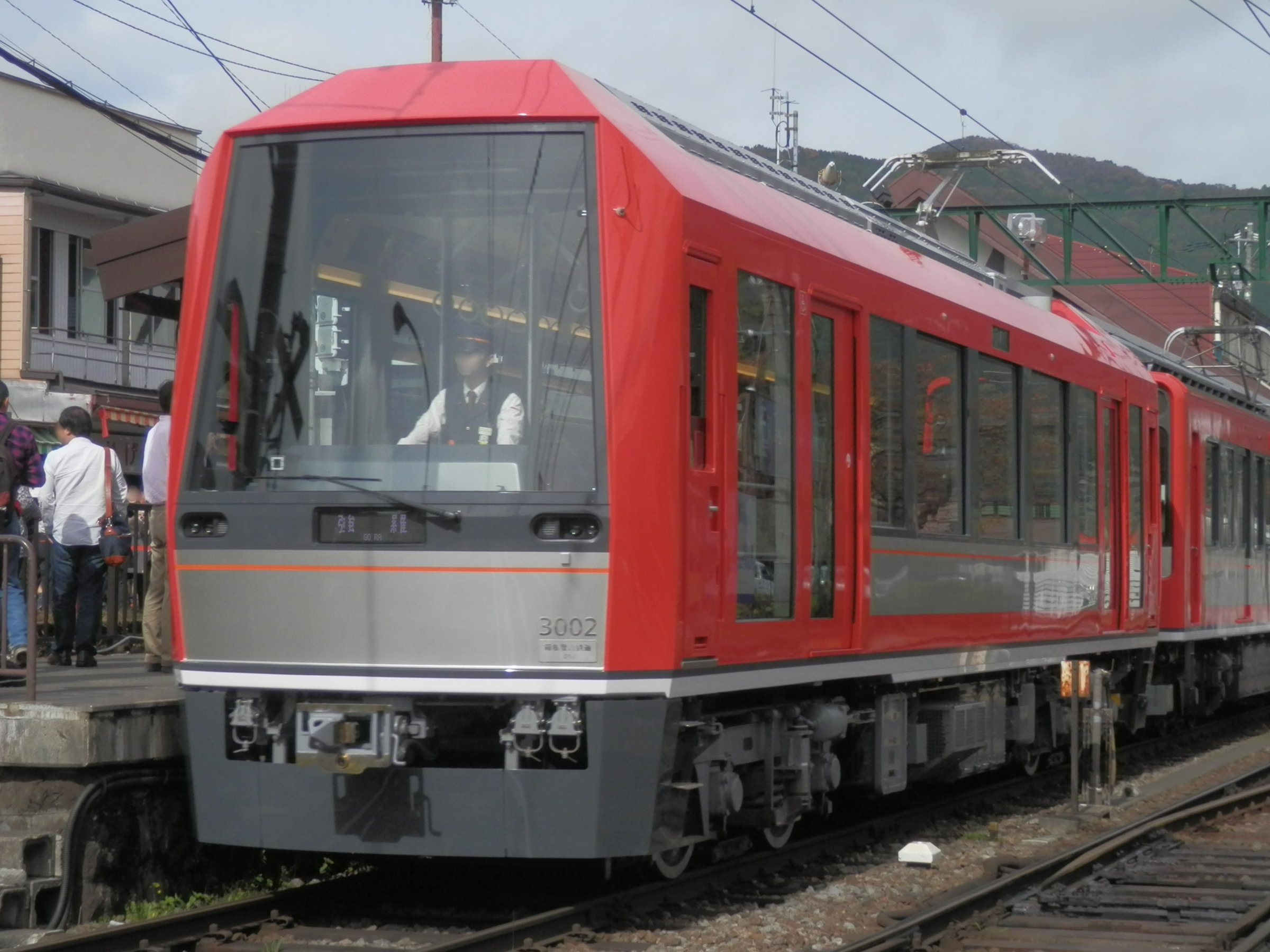
- Car 3002 at Gora Station, 2 November 2014
- Manufacturer: Kawasaki Heavy Industries
- Designer: Noriaki Okabe
- Built at: Kobe, Hyogo
- Constructed: 2014, 2019
- Entered service: 1 November 2014
- Number built: 4 vehicles
- Formation: Single car
- Fleet numbers: 3001–3004
- Capacity: 75 (36 seated)
- Operators: Hakone Tozan Railway
- Lines served: Hakone Tozan Line

Specifications
- Car body construction: Stainless steel
- Car length: 14,660 mm (48 ft 1 in)
- Width: 2,568 mm (8 ft 5.1 in)
- Height: 3,966 mm (13 ft 0.1 in)
- Doors: 2 per side
- Maximum speed: 55 km/h (35 mph)
- Weight: 35.6 t
- Traction system: TDK6060-A 3-phase squirrel-cage induction motors
- Power output: 50 kW x 4
- Acceleration: 4.0 km/(h⋅s) (2.5 mph/s)
- Deceleration: 4.0 km/(h⋅s) (2.5 mph/s) (service); 4.5 km/(h⋅s) (2.8 mph/s) (emergency)
- Electric system(s): 750/1,500 V DC overhead line
- Current collection: PT7169-A single-arm pantograph
- Bogies: TS-330B
- Braking system(s): Track brake
- Multiple working: 2000 series, 3100 series
- Track gauge: 1,435 mm (4 ft 8 1/2 in)

The Hakone Tozan 3000 series (箱根登山鉄道3000形) is a single-car electric multiple unit (EMU) train type operated by the Japanese private railway operator Hakone Tozan Railway on its steeply graded Hakone Tozan Line since 1 November 2014.

== Overview ==
The fleet consists of two single-car units branded "Allegra". The general design of the trains was overseen by Noriaki Okabe Architecture Network, with the two vehicles on order costing a total of approximately 800 million yen.

Externally, the trains are finished in the standard Hakone Tozan Railway livery of "Vermillion Hakone" with silver highlights.

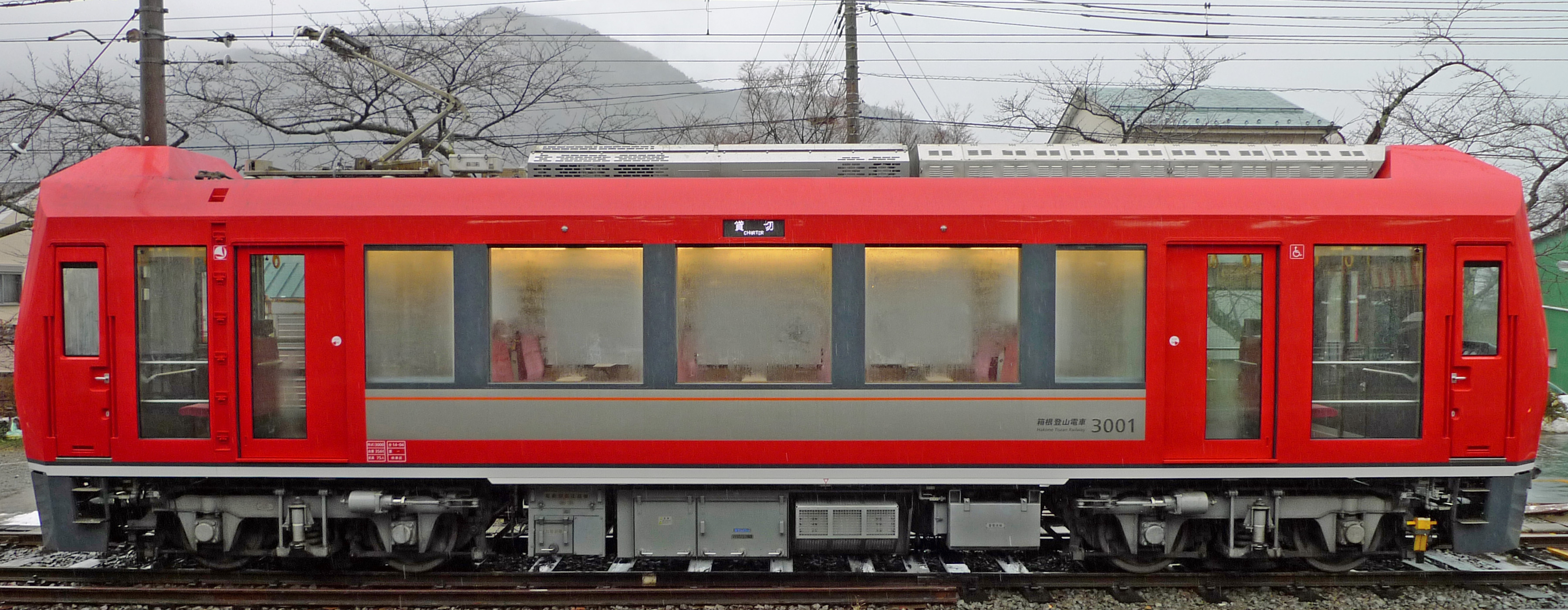
The side view of car 3001 in February 2015

== Interior ==
Passenger accommodation consists mostly of four-person seating bays, with a wheelchair space at the Gora end of the cars. Seating is provided for 36 passengers, including five pairs of tip-up seats near the doorways. Total capacity is 75, including standing passengers. The trains use LED lighting throughout.

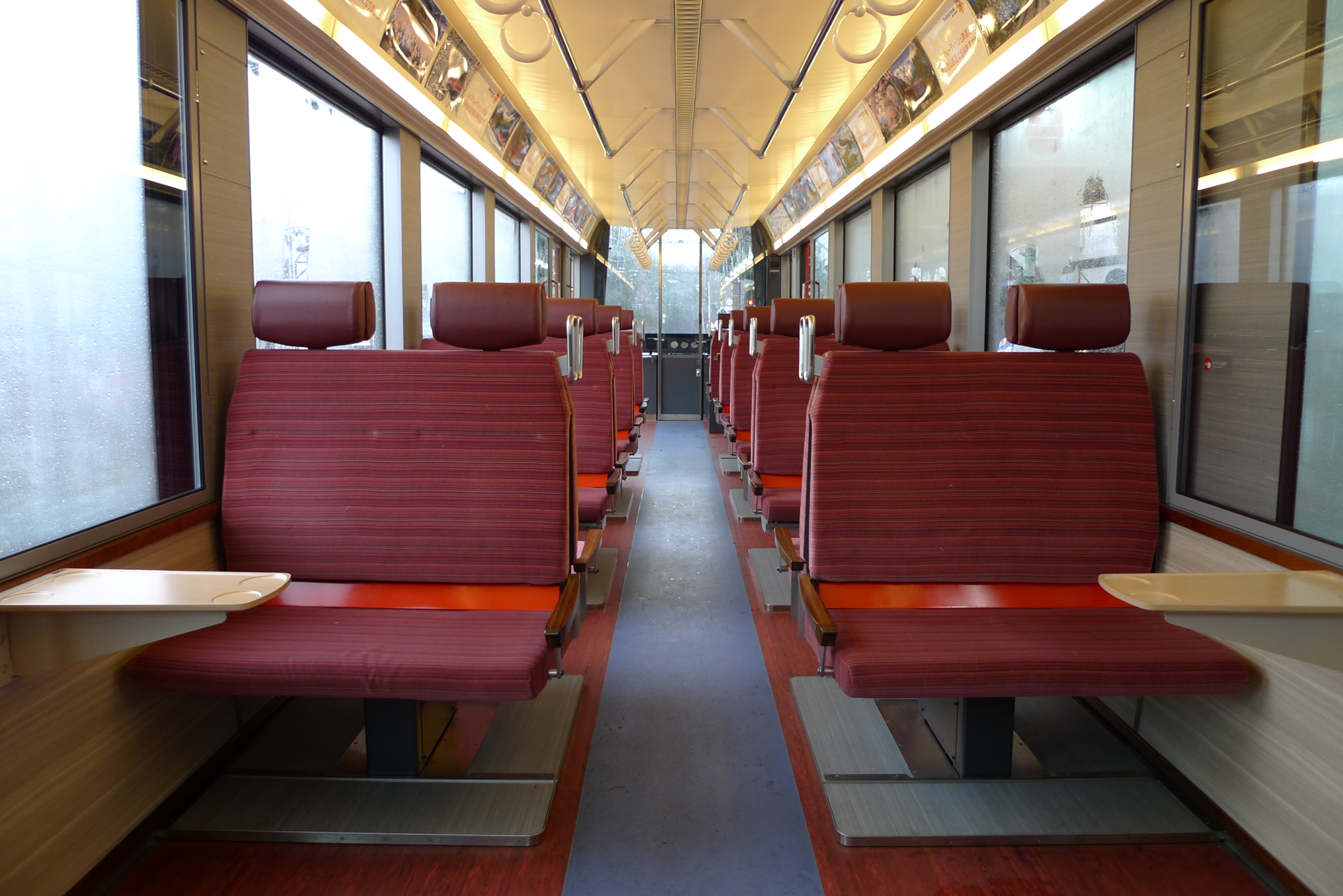
Interior view

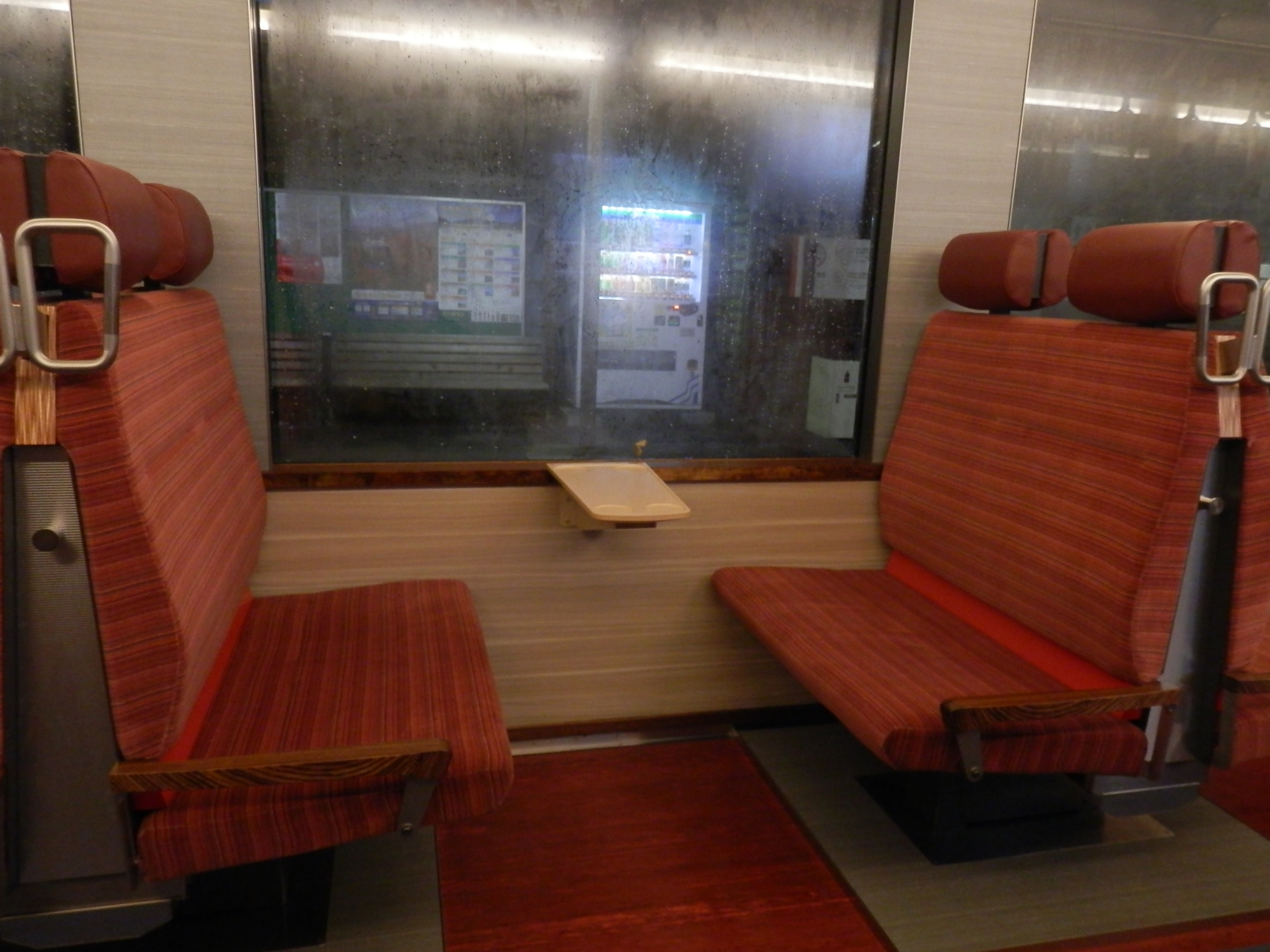
A 4-person facing seating bay

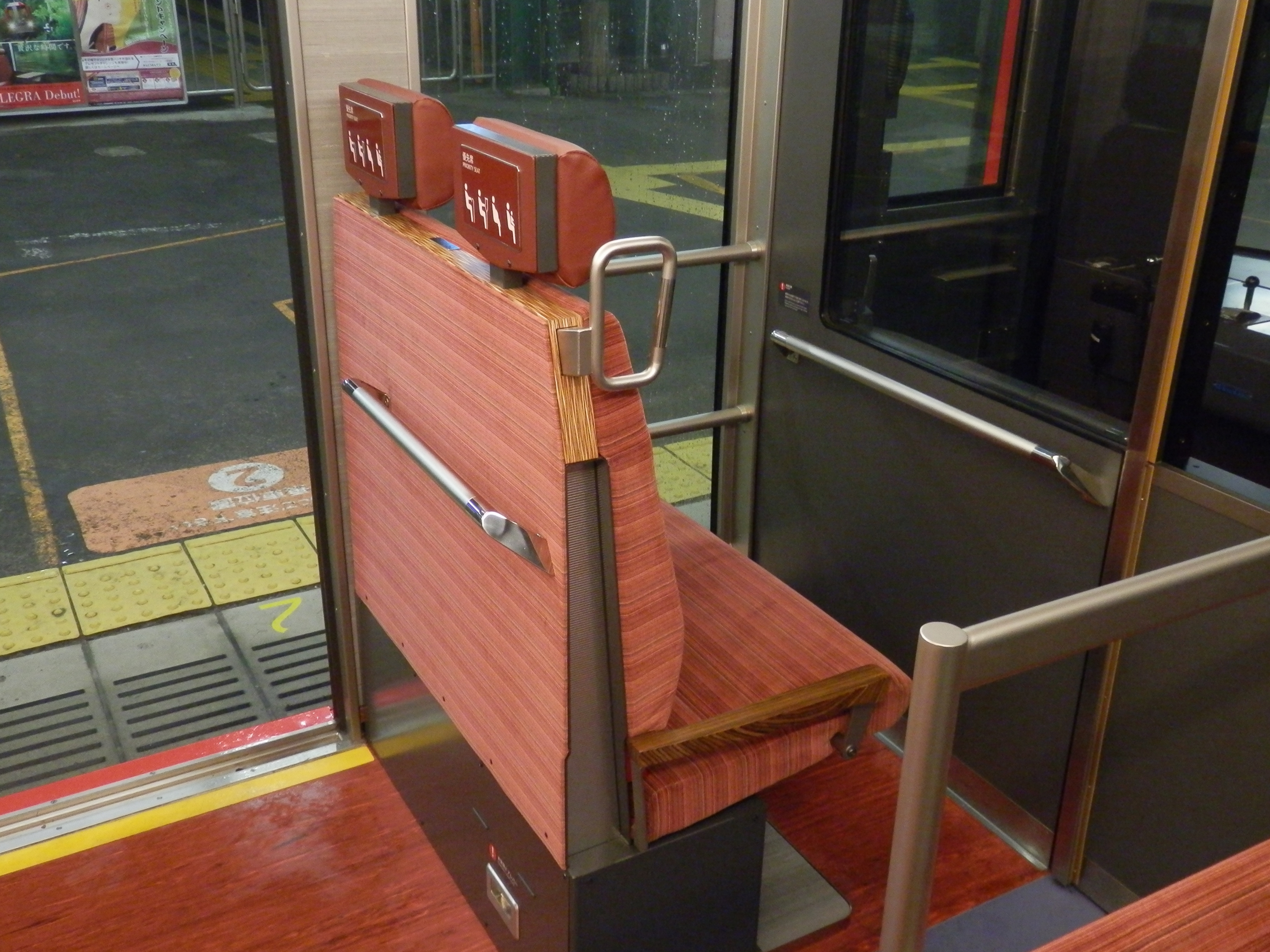
Forward-facing priority seating

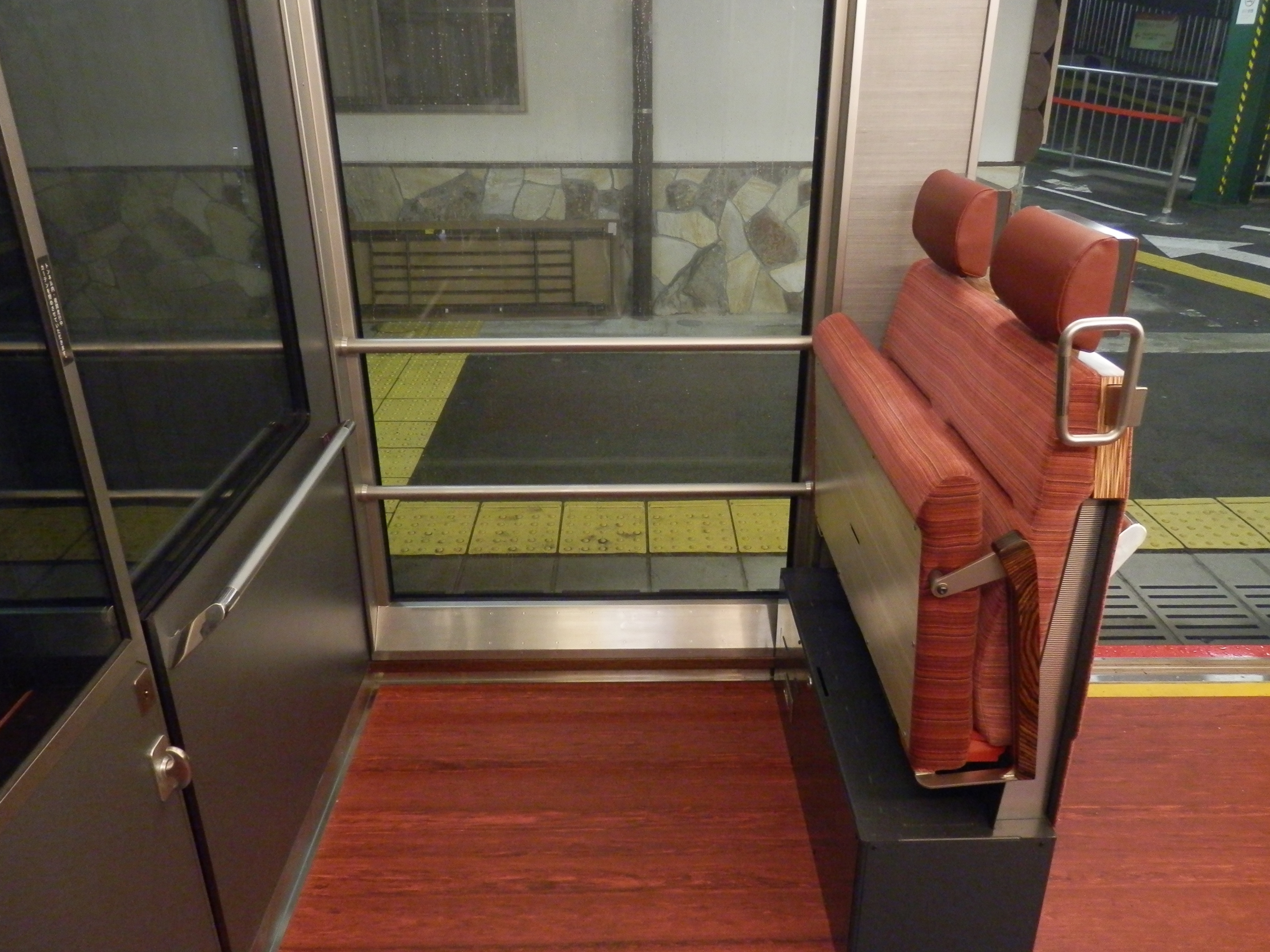
Flip-up seating

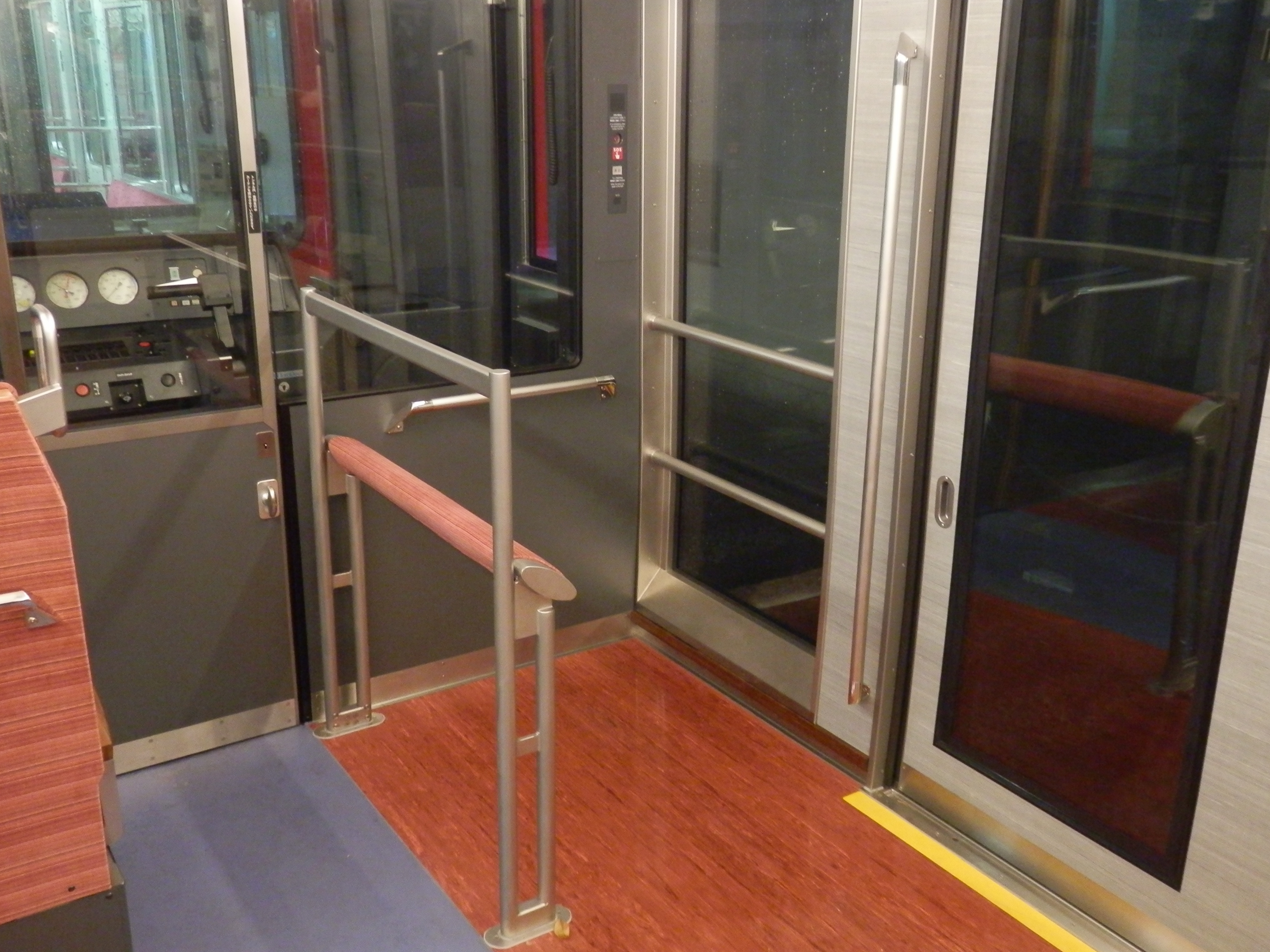
Perch seating

== History ==
The first unit was delivered from Kawasaki Heavy Industries in Kobe in April 2014, with the second unit delivered in August.

In May 2015, the 3000 series was awarded the 2015 Laurel Prize, presented annually by the Japan Railfan Club. A presentation ceremony was held at Gora Station on 8 November 2015.

Two new units, 3003 and 3004, were delivered in May 2019.
