= Okabe =

Okabe may refer to:

- Okabe (surname), a Japanese surname
- Okabe, Shizuoka, a former town in Japan that was merged into the expanded city of Fujieda
- Okabe, Saitama, a former town in Japan that was merged into the expanded city of Fukaya
- Okabe Station, a railway station in Fukaya, Saitama Prefecture, Japan
- Okabe (mountain), a Pyrenean summit in the Basse-Navarre province of the Basque country in France
- Merauke, a town in the Papua province of Indonesia, which is labeled "Okabe" on some maps
- Okabe (food), ancient Japanese word for Tofu
