= Ardanabia =

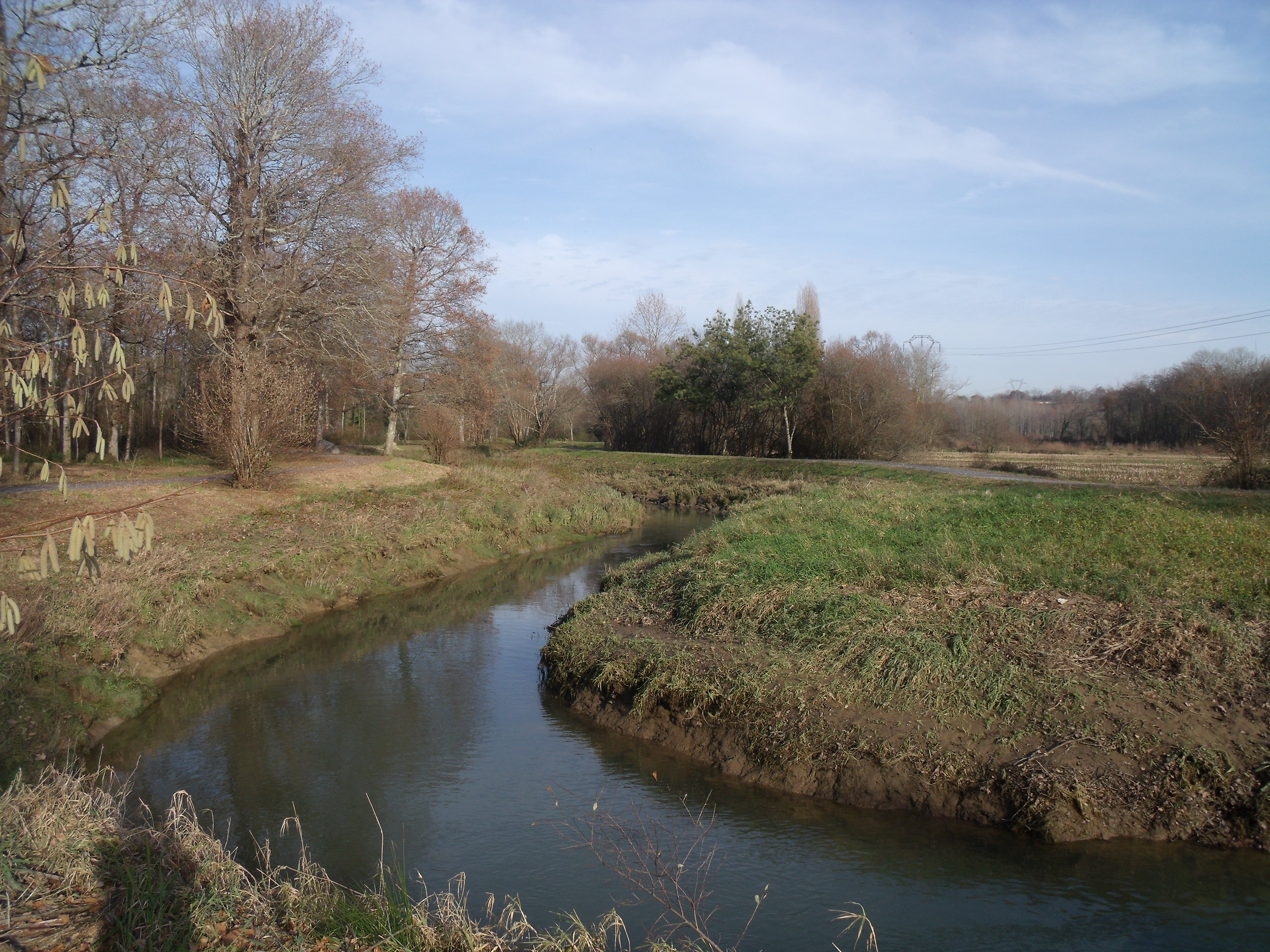

- Location within France Location within Nouvelle-Aquitaine

Location
- Country: France

Physical characteristics
- Source
  - location: Moors of Hasparren
- Mouth
  - location: Adour
  - coordinates: 43°29′52″N 1°20′59″W
- Length: 26 km (16 mi)

Basin features
- Progression: Adour→ Atlantic Ocean

The Ardanabia (French pronunciation: [aʁdanabja]; also known as Ardanabie, Ardanavie, Ardanavy, Ardanavia) is a left tributary of the Adour, in the French Basque Country, in Aquitaine, Southwest France. It is 25.7 km (16.0 mi) long.

== Geography ==
The Ardanabia rises in the moors of Hasparren, flows north meandering between Mouguerre and Briscous and joins the Adour below Urcuit.

== Name ==
The name Ardanabia proceeds from ardan-habia, that can be analyzed as 'river course in vineyards'.

== Départements and towns ==
- Pyrénées-Atlantiques: Hasparren, Mouguerre, Briscous, Urcuit.

== Main tributaries ==
- Angeluko Erreka
- Ur Handia
