= Hasparren =

Hasparren Hazparne
- Commune
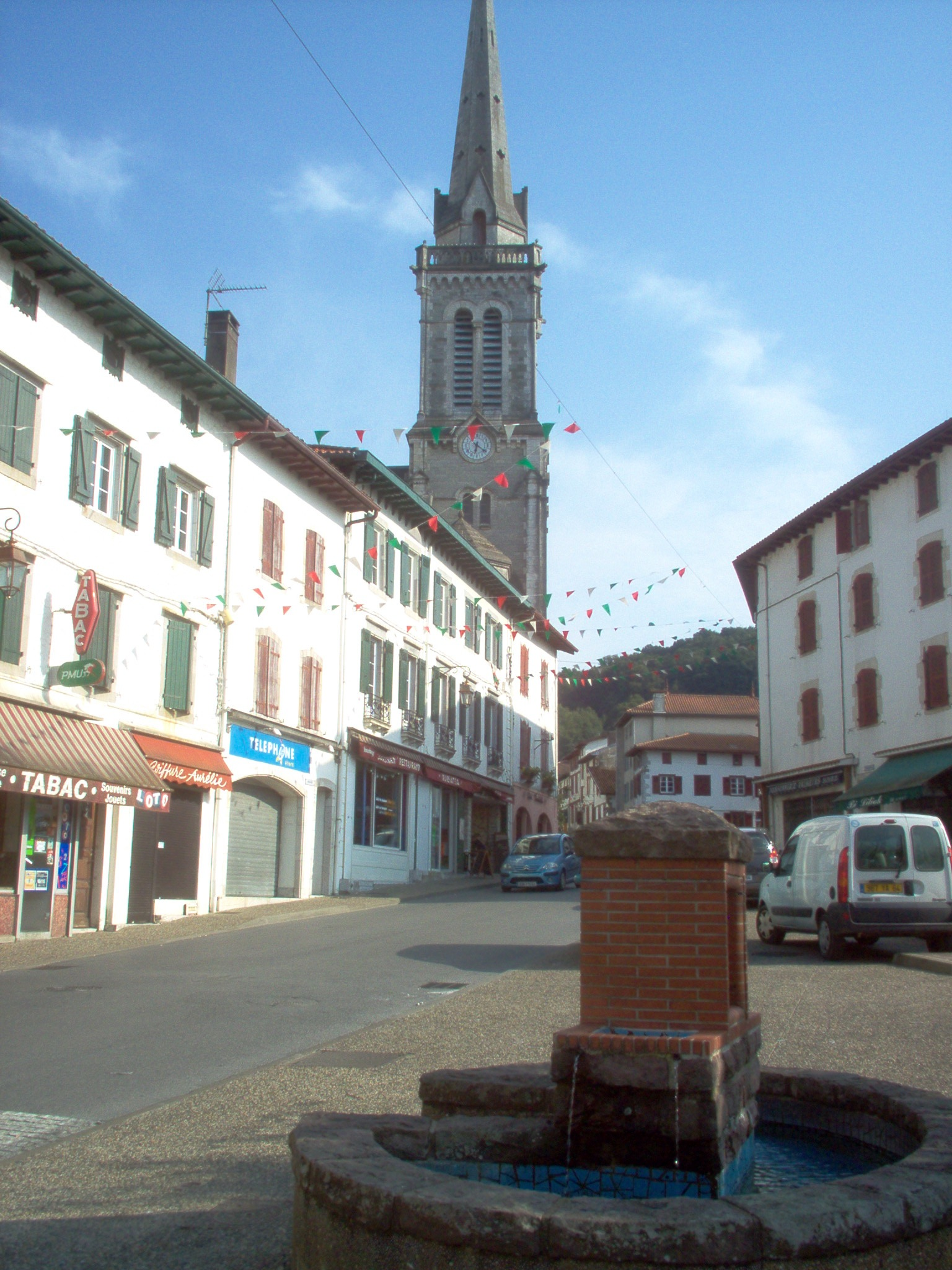
- The church of Saint Jean-Baptiste and surroundings

- Coat of arms
- Location of Hasparren
- Location within France Location within Nouvelle-Aquitaine
- Coordinates: 43°23′08″N 1°18′13″W
- Country: France
- Region: Nouvelle-Aquitaine
- Department: Pyrénées-Atlantiques
- Arrondissement: Bayonne
- Canton: Baïgura et Mondarrain
- Intercommunality: CA Pays Basque

Government
  - Mayor (2020–2026): Isabelle Pargade
- Area^{1}: 77.01 km^{2} (29.73 sq mi)
- Elevation: 89 m (292 ft)
- Highest elevation: 610 m (2,000 ft)
- Lowest elevation: 7 m (23 ft)
- Population (2023): 7,626
  - Density: 99.03/km^{2} (256.5/sq mi)
- Time zone: UTC+01:00 (CET)
  - Summer (DST): UTC+02:00 (CEST)
- INSEE/Postal code: 64256 /64240
- ^{1} French Land Register data, which excludes lakes, ponds, glaciers > 1 km^{2} (0.386 sq mi or 247 acres) and river estuaries.

Hasparren (French pronunciation: [aspaʁɛ̃]; Basque: Hazparne) is a commune in the Pyrénées-Atlantiques department in south-western France. A resident of Hasparren is known as a 'Hazpandar'.

== Geography ==
=== Location ===
It's a commune fait partie of the Basque Province of Labourd.

The Côte Basque (Euskal Kostaldea), is 25 km to the west.

=== Access ===
Hasparren is located on the route D 10, between La Bastide-Clairence and Cambo-les-Bains, at the crossroads with D 21, D 22 and D 23. It has got access to autoroute A 64, exit 4 near Briscous.

=== Hydrography ===
The rivers Ardanabia and Suhihandia (a tributary of the Aran), flow through the commune.

=== Locations ===
Eight settlements compose the Commune of Hasparren:

- Labiri 43.38516°N 1.32767°W ;
- Elizaberri 43.39157°N 1.32372°W ;
- la Coste (la Côte sur les cartes IGN) 43.40488°N 1.28398°W ;
- Peña (Pegna sur les cartes IGN) 43.40544°N 1.30036°W ;
- Minhotz 43.38975°N 1.29184°W ;
- la Ville ;
- Urcuray 43.36747°N 1.35465°W ;
- Bas-Labiri et Zelhaia 43.36438°N 1.31385°W .

== Toponymy ==
=== Ancient attestations ===
It is attestested with various words: Hesperenne (1247 in Cartulaire de Bayonne) Santus Johannes de Ahesparren, Hesparren und Haesparren (the former two 1255 and 1288 in Chapitre de Bayonne), Ahezparenne (1288, Rôles Gascons), Esparren (1310, Cartulaire de Bayonne) Aezparren, Hesperren, Hasparrem and Hesparrem (1348 both in Chapitre de Bayonne), Hasparn and Haspar (1686 and 1754, Collations du Diocèse de Bayonne), Hasparre (A map of the Basque Lands) and Hazparne (19th century).

=== Etymology ===
The toponyme Hasparren derives from the ancient Ahaitz-barren(a) > Ahaizparren(a), a composition of the Basque root ahaitz that indicates a height and barren (the interior) - and not form "Haritz barne" (Inner Oak) as the local tradition says.

=== Other toponyms ===
The toponym Elizaberri appears with the from Éliçaberria (1863, dictionnaire topographique Béarn-Pays basque).

The toponym Urcuray appears with the form Saint-Joseph d'Urcuraye (1662, collations du diocèse de Bayonne).

The toponym Celhay appears with the from Célay (1863, dictionnaire topographique Béarn-Pays basque).

=== Basque spelling ===
The current Basque name is Hazparne.

== Population ==
Historical population
Year	Pop.	±% p.a.
1968	5,048	—
1975	5,081	+0.09%
1982	5,303	+0.61%
1990	5,399	+0.22%
1999	5,477	+0.16%
2007	5,839	+0.80%
2012	6,160	+1.08%
2017	6,879	+2.23%
2023	7,626	+1.73%
Source: INSEE

== Notable people ==
- Ana Maria Bidegaray - activist, spy, resistance fighter in both World Wars

== See also ==
- Communes of the Pyrénées-Atlantiques department
