= Ahaitz =

Basque place name

Ahaitz or Ahaize is a Basque place name referring to flat areas in mountainous ranges favorable to human settlement. It literally means "rock".

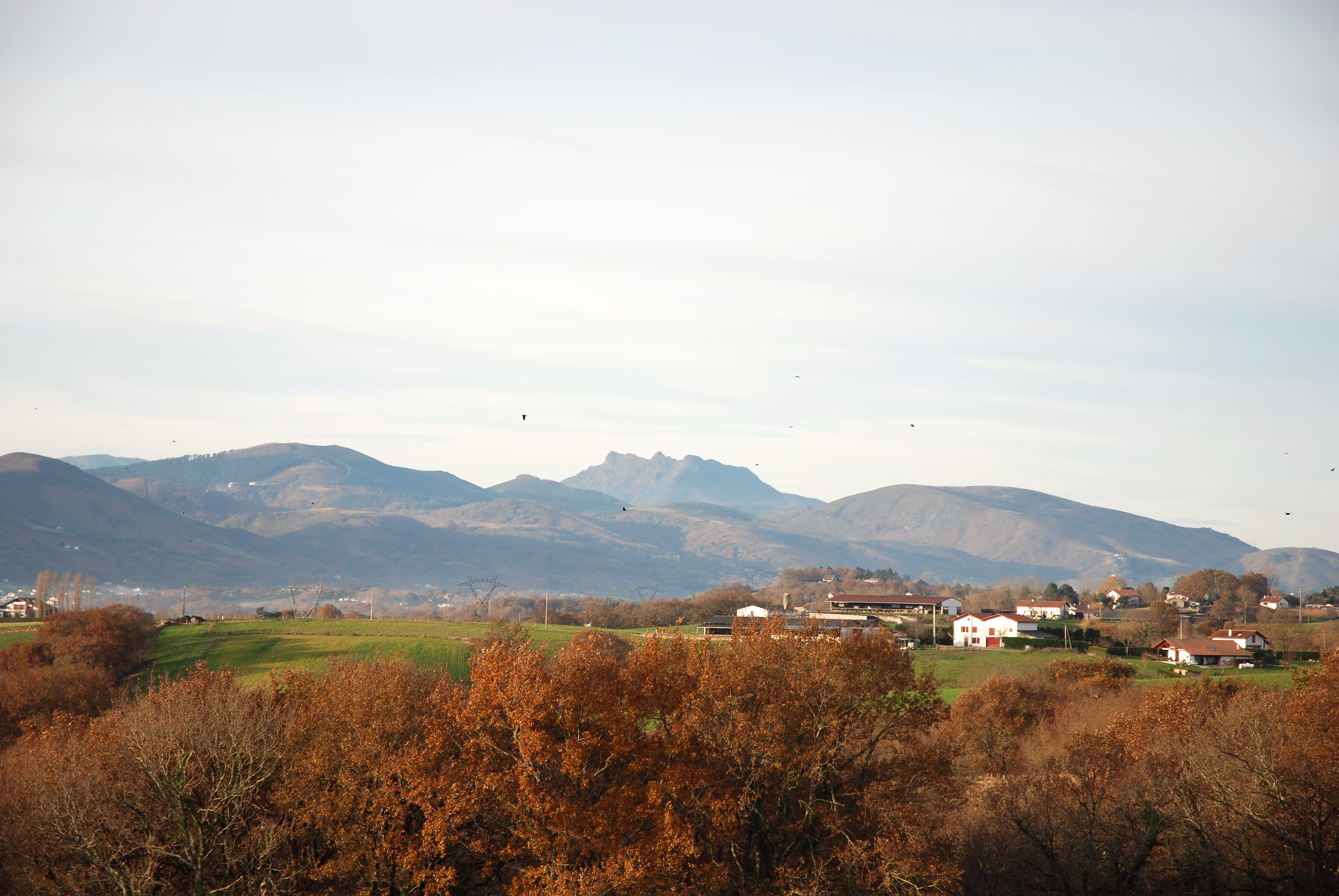
Les Trois Couronnes, seen from Ahetze

It may refer to:

- Ahaize, a hamlet of the commune of Ossès.
- Ahaxe, a commune of the Pyrénées-Atlantiques.

It is at the origin of place names as:

- Ahetze, a commune of the Pyrénées-Atlantiques and a former mande of Lower Navarre.
- Ahaizparren: Hasparren, Azparren, Asparren
- Aezkoa (Ahezcoa in 1137), a valley of Navarre.
