= Ana Maria Bidegaray =

Spanish spy and resistance fighter (1883-1948)

- Born: 10 April 1890; Hasparren, France
- Died: 17 July 1974 (aged 84); Montevideo, Uruguay
- Occupations: Writer, spy, resistance fighter, feminist, activist

Ana María Bidegaray Salaverria (10 April 1890 – 17 July 1974) was a Basque feminist activist, resistance fighter, and humanitarian who played a pivotal role during both World War I and World War II. Known for her courage, ingenuity, and dedication to justice, she left a lasting legacy as a spy and organizer of humanitarian aid networks.

== Early life ==
Ana María Bidegaray was born in Hazparne (Hasparren), Labourd (Lapurdi), in the Basque Country, although she was raised in Uruguay. Her parents returned to their homeland for her birth to ensure she was born in the "Basque cradle." She later married Raymond Janssen, the Consul General of Belgium in Uruguay, which provided her with diplomatic connections that she would leverage in her resistance activities.

== Resistance activities ==
During World War I, Bidegaray collaborated with British and French intelligence services. She used her husband's diplomatic ties to gather Intelligence on German prison camps and helped establish the "Bidegaray Network". This network facilitated the escape of Belgian prisoners of war into Allied territories and provided critical humanitarian aid to civilians affected by the war.

Her efforts continued during World War II, where she extended her resistance work by collaborating with the Basque Government in exile. She helped identify and capture Spanish, Italian, and German agents seeking refuge in Uruguay.

== Legacy ==
Ana María Bidegaray was decorated twice for her bravery: first by Albert I of Belgium for her contributions during World War I, and later by the Red Cross for her humanitarian efforts during World War II. Her work not only saved countless lives but also highlighted the role of women in resistance movements.

She authored Cuna Vasca, a biography exploring Basque immigrant experiences in America, further emphasizing her commitment to preserving Basque identity and history.

== See also ==
- Resistance during World War II
