= Uhabia =

Coastal river in Aquitaine, France

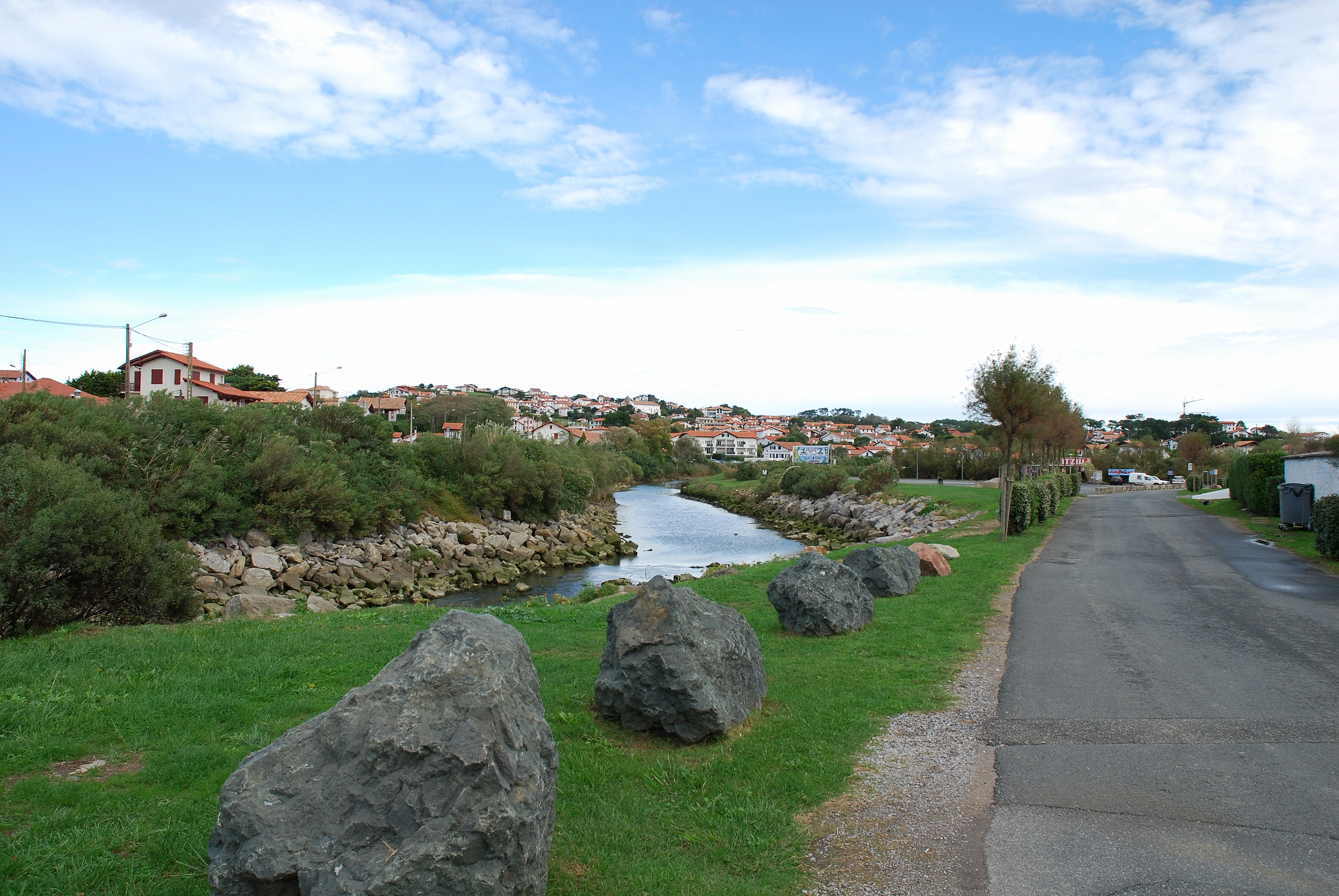
- The Uhabia in Bidart

Location
- Country: France

Physical characteristics
- Source
  - location: Woods of Ustaritz
- Mouth
  - location: Bay of Biscay
  - coordinates: 43°25′56″N 1°35′59″W
- Length: 15 km (9 mi)

The Uhabia or Ouhabia is a coastal river of the French Basque Country, in Aquitaine, southwest France. It is 15.1 km (9.4 mi) long.

== Geography ==
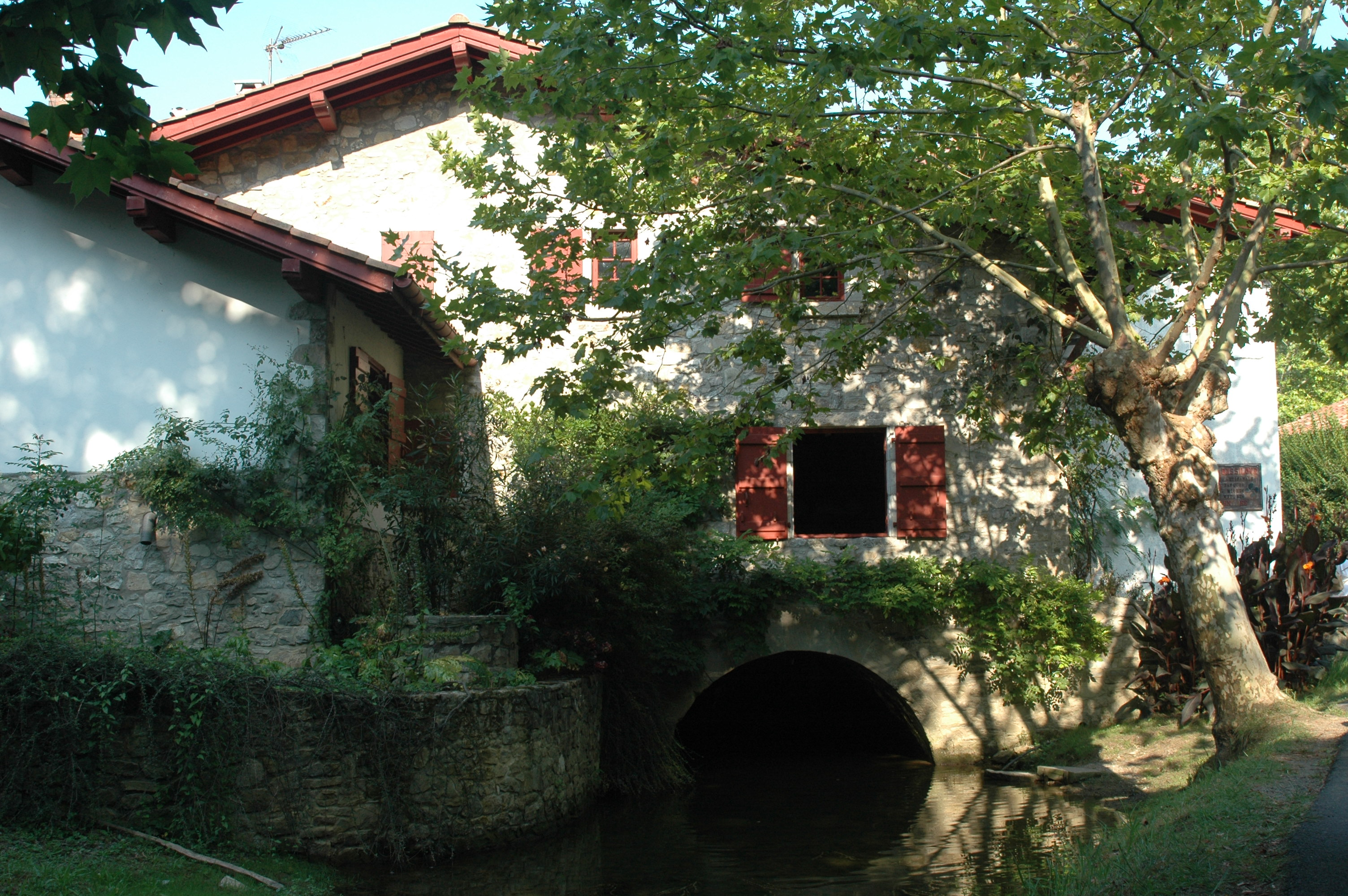
Bidart, the Mill of Bassilour (1741) on the Uhabia

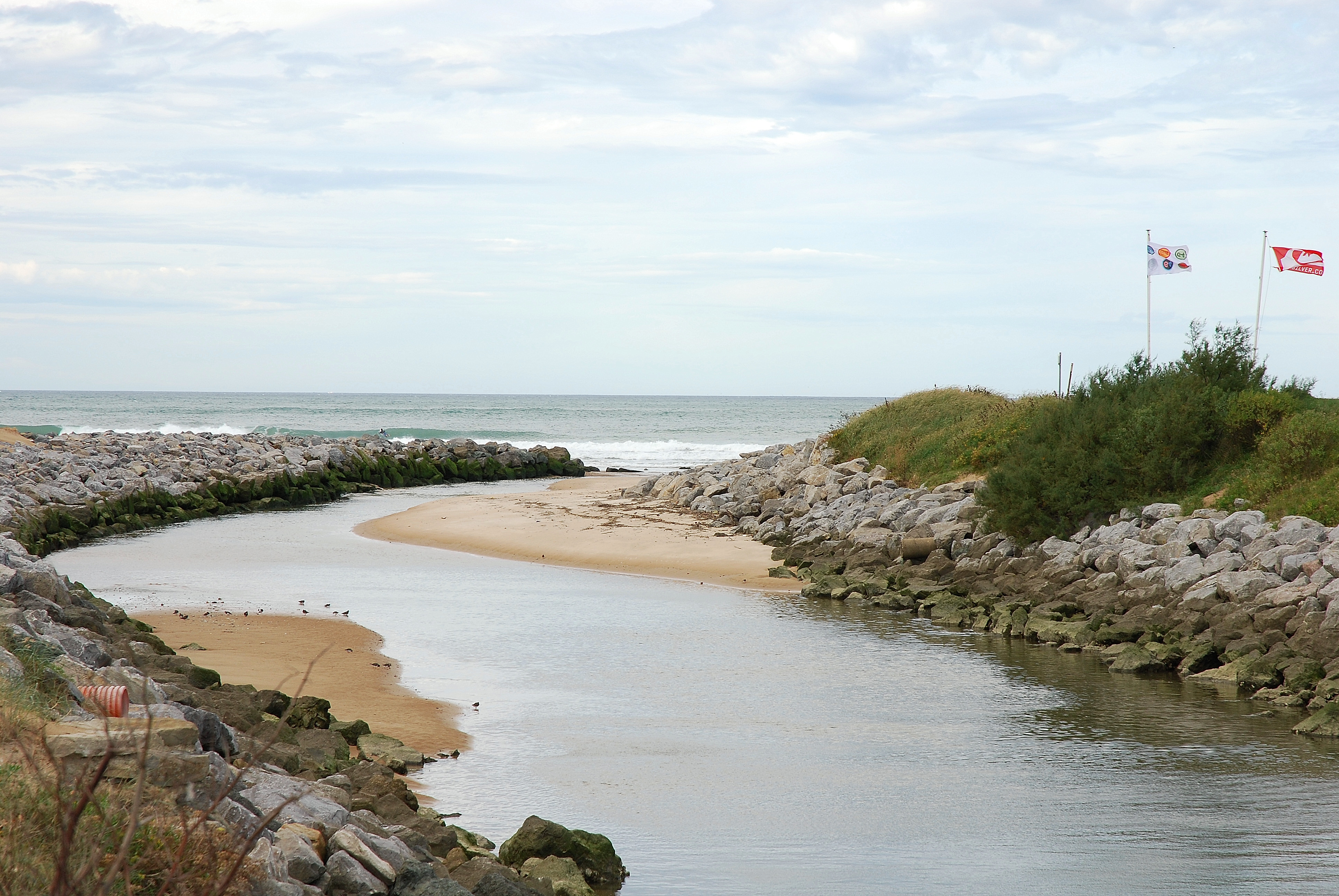
The estuary of the Uhabia

It rises at Goizbide in the woods above Ustaritz and Saint-Pée-sur-Nivelle, where it is known as the Apalagako erreka. It collects waters from the Alhorgako Erreka and drains the plain of Belhardi in the north of Ahetze, before flowing into the Bay of Biscay in Bidart.

== Name ==
Its name Uhabia is the regular evolution of ur habia, that can be translated as "course of the water".

== Main tributaries ==
- Barrandiko Erreka, from Othe Xuria
- Alhorgako Erreka, from Zirikolatz

== Départements and towns ==
- Pyrénées-Atlantiques: Ustaritz, Arbonne, Bidart.
