= Habia (placename element) =

Habia, probably from habe(a), is an element in river names as:

- the Uhabia, a coastal river of the French Basque Country,
- the Ardanabia, a left tributary of the Adour.

It may also be found in names as: Azkabi (Lohitzun), Habiaga (Ainharp, Arrast-Larrebieu, Iholdy), Zehabia (Armendarits), Zehabiaga (Chéraute), Intzabi, Okabe…

The word habia means 'nest' in modern Basque. Its original meaning is 'hole', 'lower place', where rivers flow.
