= Odakyu 50000 series VSE =

Japanese EMU trainset

Odakyu 50000 series Vault Super Express
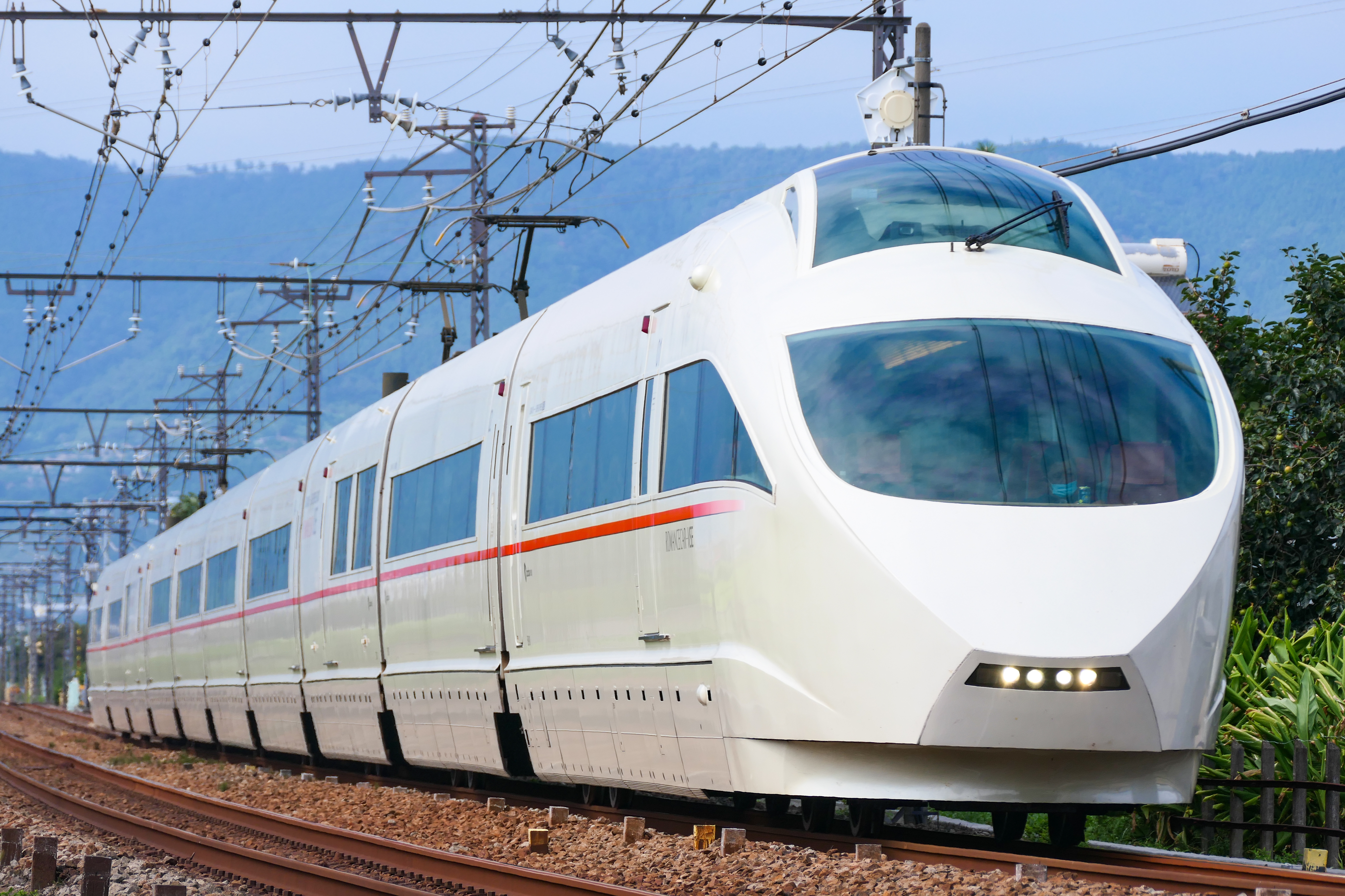
- Odakyu 50000 series VSE, August 2020
- In service: March 2005 – December 2023 (regular service ended in 2022)
- Manufacturer: Nippon Sharyo
- Designer: Noriaki Okabe
- Family name: Romancecar
- Entered service: 19 March 2005
- Number built: 20 vehicles (2 sets)
- Number in service: None
- Number preserved: 1 vehicle
- Formation: 10 cars per trainset
- Operator: Odakyu
- Lines served: Odawara Line; Enoshima Line; Hakone Tozan Line

Specifications
- Car body construction: Aluminium
- Car length: 14 m (45 ft 11 in)
- Maximum speed: 110 km/h (68 mph) (service); 130 km/h (81 mph) (design)
- Traction system: Toshiba 2-level IGBT-VVVF
- Acceleration: 2.0 km/(h⋅s) (1.2 mph/s)
- Deceleration: 4.0 km/(h⋅s) (2.5 mph/s) (service); 4.5 km/(h⋅s) (2.8 mph/s) (emergency)
- Electric systems: 1,500 V DC overhead catenary
- Current collection: Pantograph
- UIC classification: 2′(Bo)′(Bo)′(Bo)′(Bo)′2′(Bo)′(Bo)′(Bo)′(Bo)′2′
- Braking system: Regenerative brake
- Safety system: ATS (OM)
- Track gauge: 1,067 mm (3 ft 6 in)

Notes/references
- This train won the 49th Blue Ribbon Award in 2006.

The Odakyu 50000 series (Japanese: 小田急50000形, romanized: Odakyū 50000-gata), branded VSE (Vault Super Express), was an electric multiple unit (EMU) train type operated by Odakyu Electric Railway on Romancecar services in Japan. Two 10-car articulated sets were introduced in March 2005, manufactured by Nippon Sharyo.

The type won a Japanese Good Design Award in 2005, and a Blue Ribbon Award in 2006.

On 11 March 2022, the train type was withdrawn from regular service, and reserved for use on special services only. The last trainset was retired on 10 December 2023.

== Design ==
Designed by architect Noriaki Okabe, the 50000 series was developed in response to a decrease in limited express service usage to the Hakone region. Body construction consisted of double-skin aluminium.

The 50000 series had regenerative brakes, and was equipped with air suspension and tilting for passenger comfort.

As with most previous Romancecar trains, the train cars in the sets were articulated.

=== Interior ===
Passenger accommodation primarily consisted of 2+2 abreast seating, with a seat pitch of 1,010 millimetres (40 in) in the leading cars and 1,050 millimetres (41 in) in the intermediate cars. The seats were rotated five degrees toward the windows. In the leading cars, the frontmost seats could be arranged in a longitudinal, lounge-like configuration. Car 3 used compartment-style seating.

The interior's vaulted ceiling was the namesake for the train type.

The 50000 series trains' driver's cabs were located above the passenger saloon, giving passengers a view out of the front of the train. This arrangement was used on earlier Odakyu Romancecar trains, although discontinued with the 30000 series EXE trains.

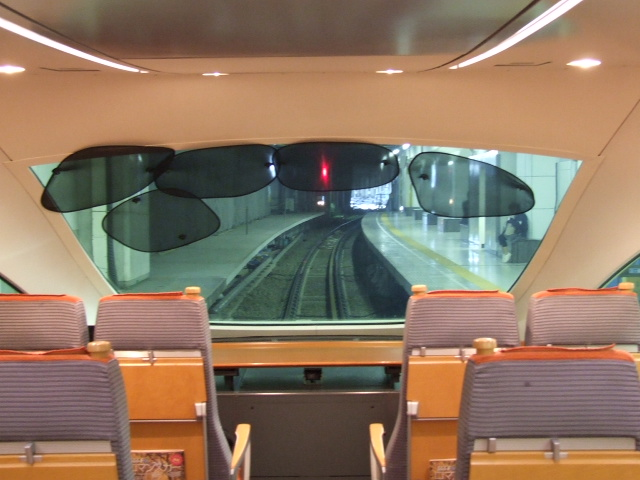
View out of front of the train (there are sun visors in summer)

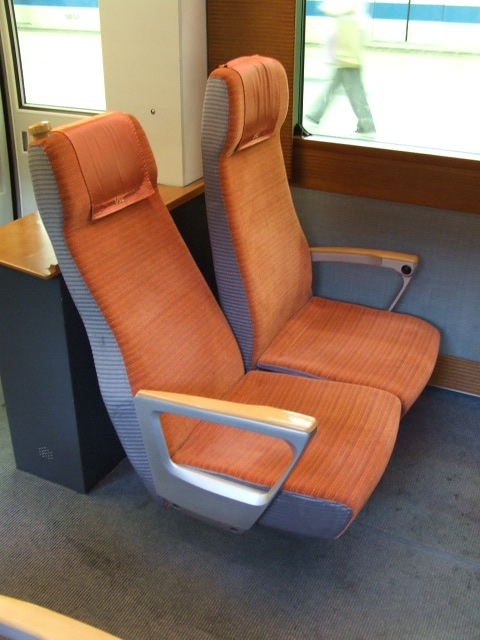
Saloon seating

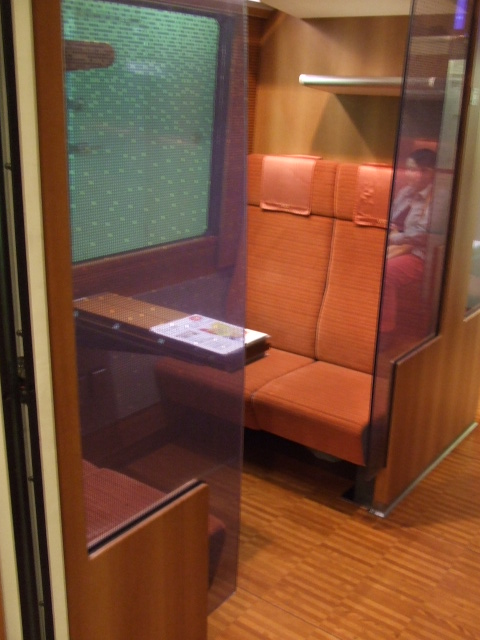
Compartment seating

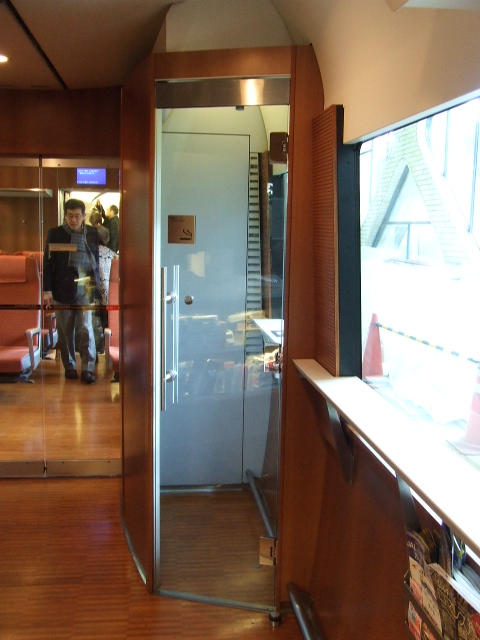
Former smoking booth (no longer used)

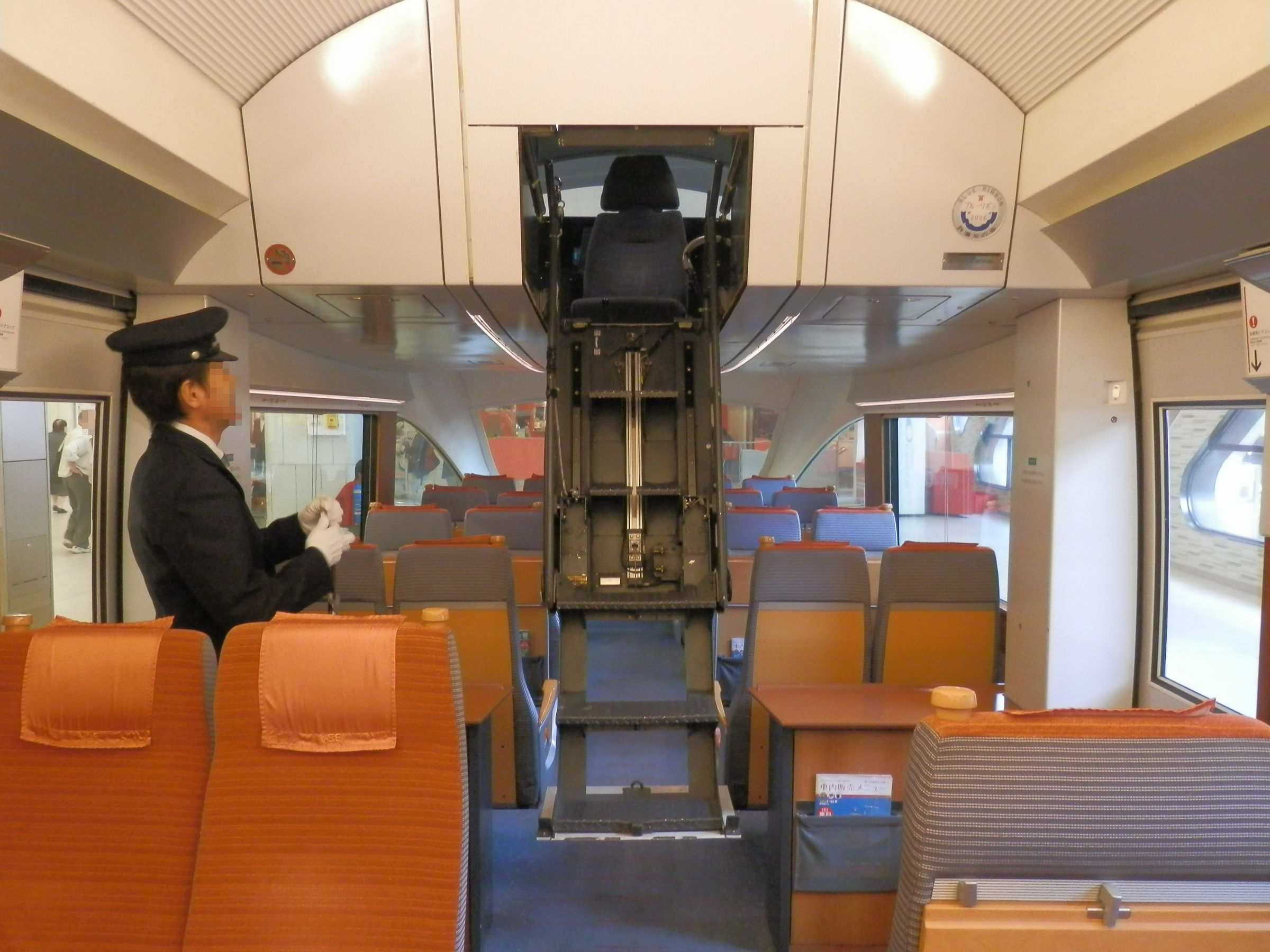
Retractable ladder providing access to the raised driver's cab

== Formation ==
The sets were formed as follows.

| | ← Shinjuku Hakone Yumoto, Odawara → | | | | | | | | | |
| Car No. | 10 | 9 | 8 | 7 | 6 | 5 | 4 | 3 | 2 | 1 |
| Designation | DeHa 50000 (M1c) | DeHa 50100 (M2) | DeHa 50200 (M3) | DeHa 50300 (M4) | DeHa 50400 (M5) | DeHa 50500 (M6) | DeHa 50600 (M7) | DeHa 50700 (M8) | DeHa 50800 (M9) | DeHa 50900 (M10c) |
| Weight (t) | 29.7 | 24.7 | 25.7 | 25.7 | 24.5 | 24.3 | 25.5 | 25.6 | 24.6 | 29.9 |
| Capacity | 48 | 40 | 10 | 40 | 40 | 40 | 40 | 12 | 40 | 48 |

- The leading cars had observation spaces.
- Cars 3 and 8 were equipped with cafeterias and lavatories.
- Car 3 had a wheelchair space, and featured slightly wider sliding doors.

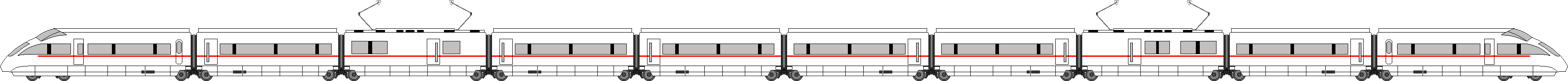
Odakyu 50000 series VSE

== History ==
The first set was delivered from Nippon Sharyo in November 2004, and entered service on 19 March 2005.

=== Withdrawal ===
Odakyu initially planned to refurbish the 50000 series trains. However, as a result of the train type's overall difficulty to repair and advanced technology required to do so, Odakyu announced on 17 December 2021 its decision to retire them. On 29 January 2022, set 50002 was adorned with decorations to commemorate the type's withdrawal.

The trains were relegated to special services on 11 March 2022, and were planned to be completely retired in 2023. On 23 and 24 September 2023, Odakyu held special group tours where the two VSE sets ran and passed each other side by side. These were the final runs of set 50002, which was retired immediately afterwards.

In 2023, Odakyu announced that the last set, set 50001 would be retired in December of that year. Commemorative goods and NFTs of the 50000 series were placed for sale. Several tours were scheduled in November and December using set 50001, and charter service using the 50000 series ended on or before 30 November. Set 50001 made its final run on 10 December 2023, marking the retirement of the series. The two trainsets travelled a total distance of 6.23 million kilometres (3.87 million miles) over the type's 18-year service life.

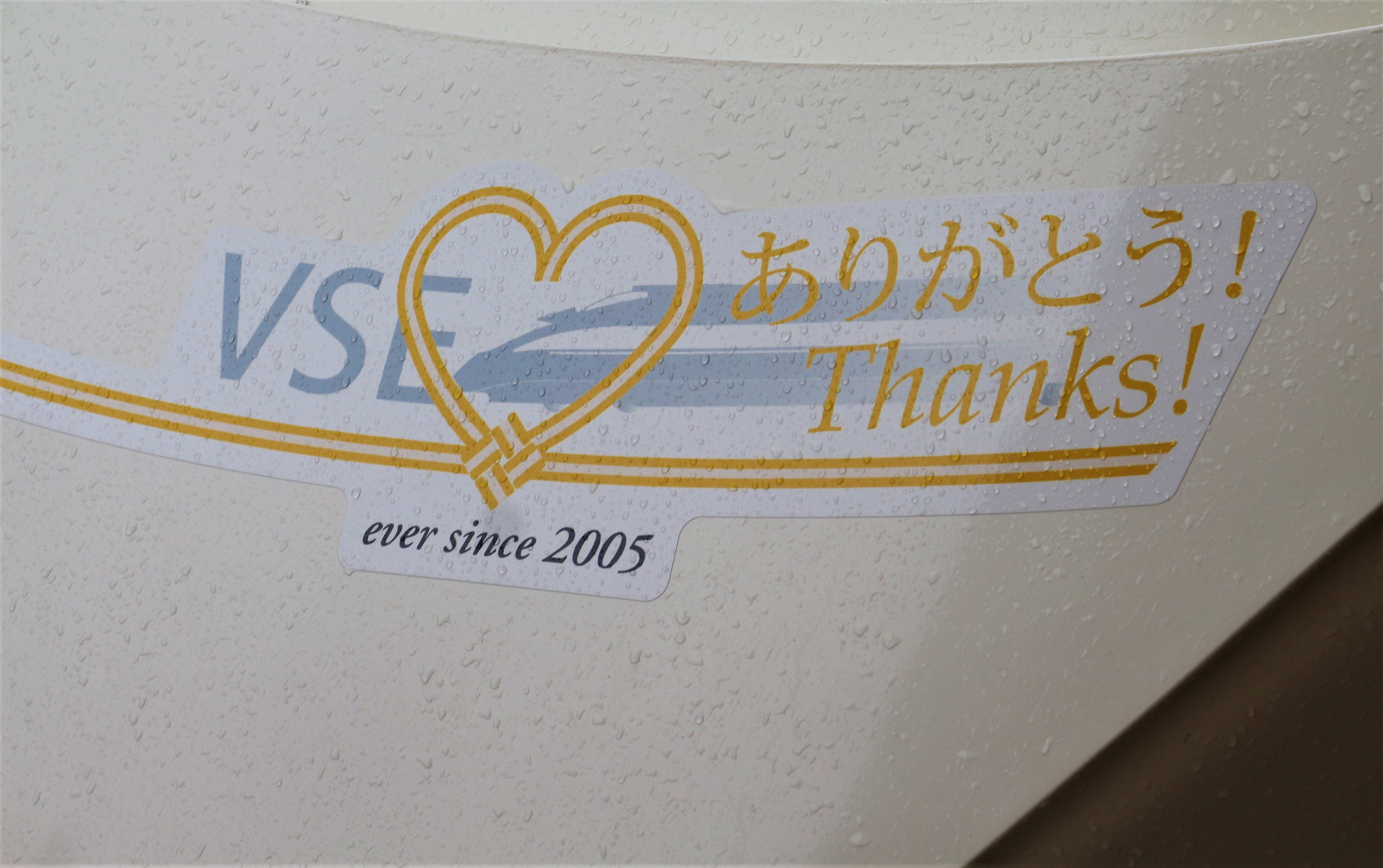
Commemorative front-end logo, February 2022

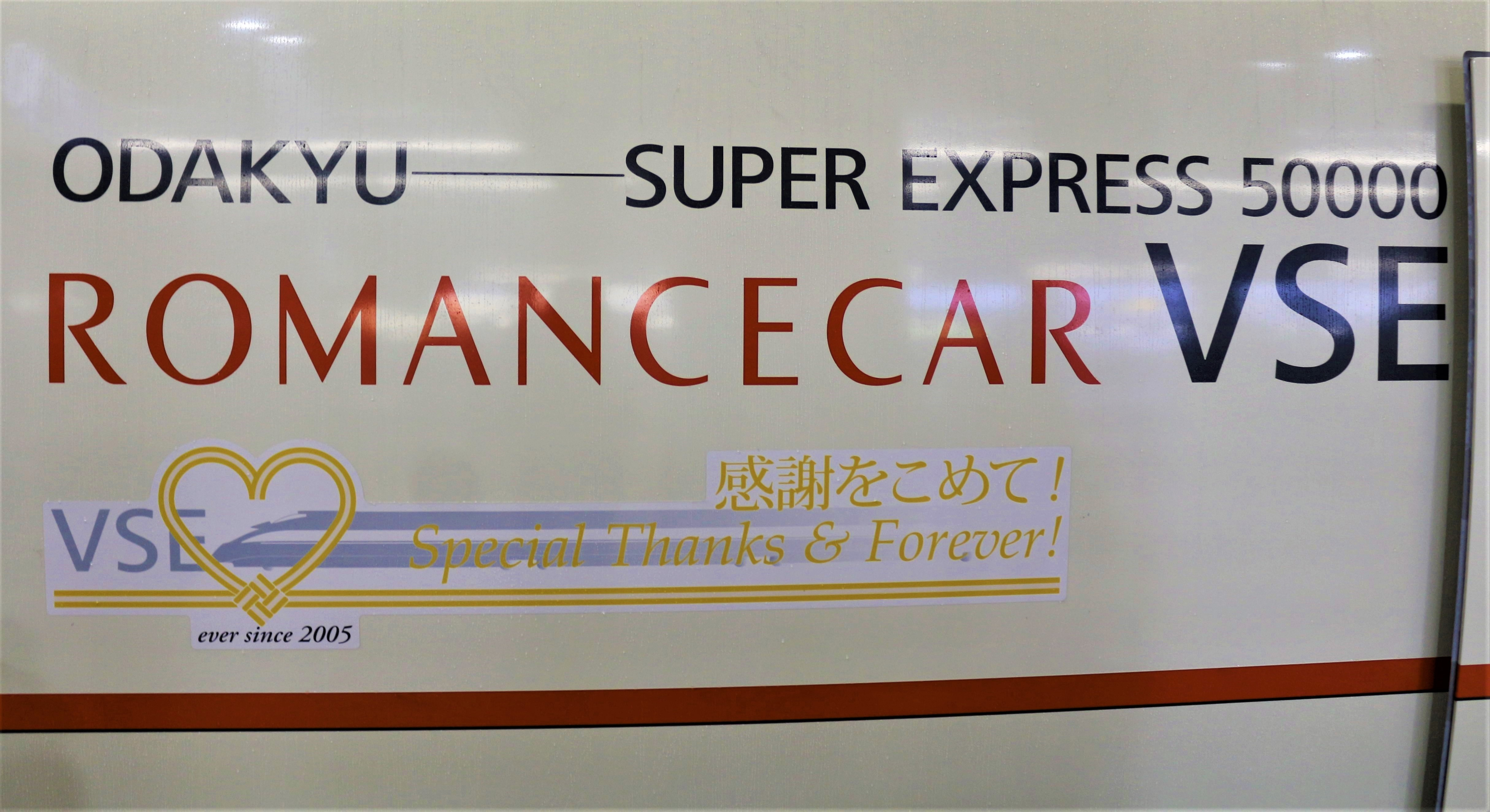
Commemorative bodyside logo, February 2022

== Preservation ==
On 17 November 2025, Odakyu announced its plans to preserve one end car of set 50001. It was scheduled to be exhibited at the Romancecar Museum in Ebina, Kanagawa, from March 2026.
