= Odakyu 70000 series GSE =

Japanese train type

Odakyu 70000 series Graceful Super Express
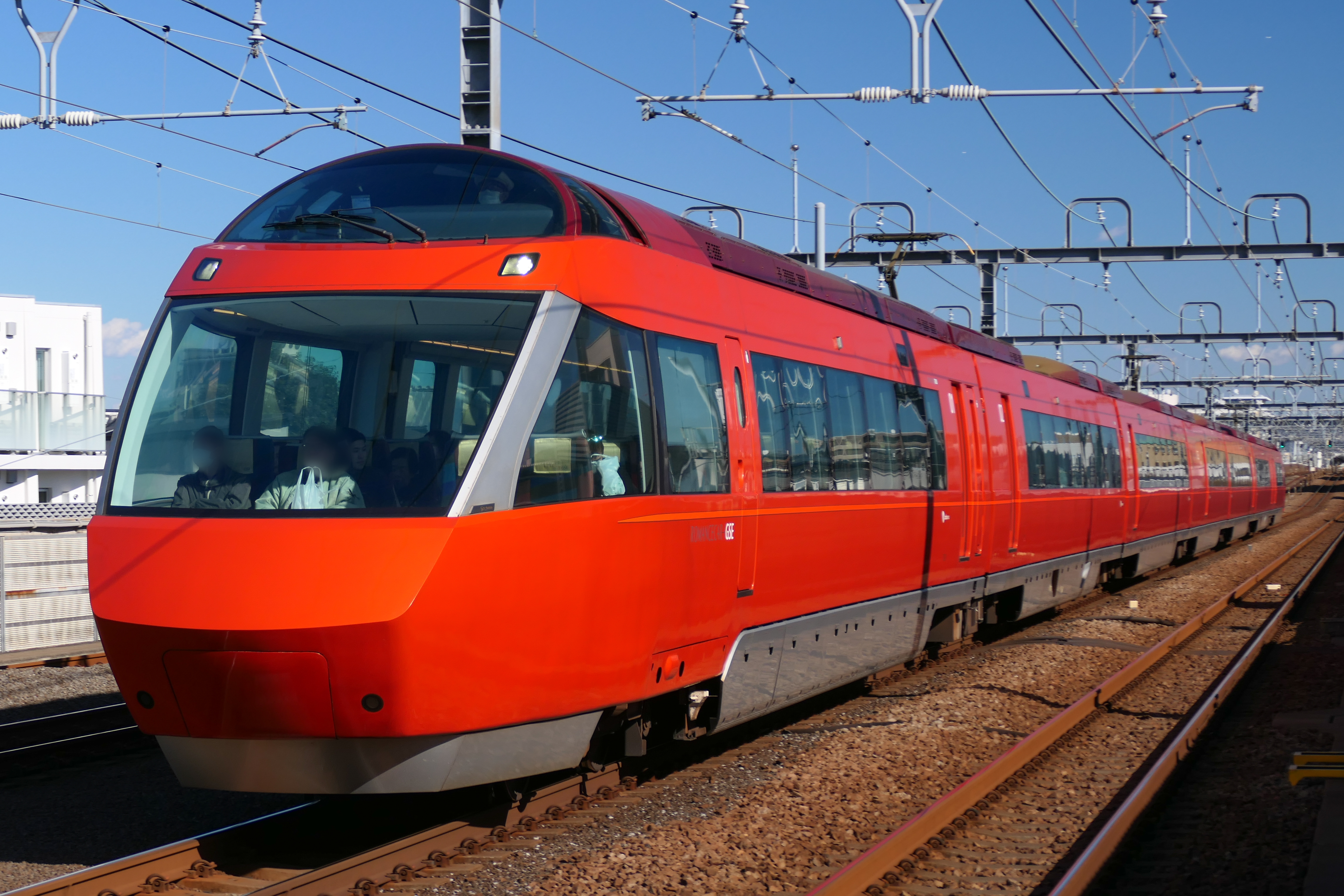
- Odakyu 70000 series GSE in November 2021
- In service: 2018–present
- Manufacturer: Nippon Sharyo
- Designer: Noriaki Okabe
- Built at: Toyokawa, Aichi
- Replaced: 7000 series "LSE"
- Constructed: 2017–2018
- Entered service: 17 March 2018
- Number built: 14 vehicles (2 sets)
- Number in service: 14 vehicles (2 sets)
- Formation: 7 cars per set
- Fleet numbers: 70051–70052
- Operator: Odakyu Electric Railway
- Line served: Odakyu Odawara Line

Specifications
- Car length: 20.000 m (65 ft 7 in) (intermediate cars); 21.330 m (70 ft 0 in) (end cars)
- Width: 2.878 m (9 ft 5 in)
- Height: 4.057 m (13 ft 4 in)
- Floor height: 2.79 m (9 ft 2 in)
- Maximum speed: 110 km/h (68 mph)
- Traction system: Mitsubishi Electric MAP-198-15V310 2-level SiC-MOSFET–VVVF inverter PG sensorless vector control
- Traction motors: Mitsubishi MB-5157-A 190 kW (250 hp) totally enclosed fan-cooled 3-phase AC induction motor
- Acceleration: 0.56 m/s^{2} (1.3 mph/s)
- Deceleration: 1.10 m/s^{2} (2.5 mph/s) (service); 1.30 m/s^{2} (2.9 mph/s) (emergency)
- Electric systems: 1,500 V DC overhead catenary
- Current collection: Pantograph
- UIC classification: 2′2′+Bo′Bo′+Bo′Bo′+2′2′+Bo′Bo′+Bo′Bo′+2′2′
- Safety systems: D-ATS-P, OM-ATS
- Track gauge: 1,067 mm (3 ft 6 in)

Notes/references
- This train won the 62nd Blue Ribbon Award in 2019.

The Odakyu 70000 series (小田急70000形, Odakyū 70000-gata) or GSE (Graceful Super Express) is a Romancecar electric multiple unit (EMU) train type operated by the private railway operator Odakyu Electric Railway on the Odakyu Odawara Line in Japan since 17 March 2018. Two 7-car trainsets were built by Nippon Sharyo between 2017 and 2018, replacing the 7000 series "LSE" sets.

== Design ==
Two seven-car trainsets were built by Nippon Sharyo, with the design overseen by Noriaki Okabe Architecture Network. The total cost of the two trains was approximately 4 billion yen. The trains are finished in a "Rose vermillion" livery with "Romancecar vermillion" and grey body side stripe.

Individual cars are equipped with electro-hydraulic full-active suspension to minimize lateral vibration.

The 70000 series was among the Good Design Best 100 for 2018, eventually receiving the Good Design Gold Award for that year, and the Blue Ribbon Award in 2019.

== Operations ==
The trains primarily operate on the Odakyu Odawara Line between Shinjuku in Tokyo and Hakone-Yumoto in Kanagawa Prefecture.

== Formations ==
The trains are formed as seven-car sets of 20 m (65 ft 7 in) bogie cars, as follows, with four motored ("M") cars and three non-powered trailer ("T") cars, and car 1 at the western (Hakone/Odawara) end.

Car No.	1	2	3	4	5	6	7
Designation	Tc2	M4	M3	T	M2	M1	Tc1
Numbering	KuHa 7035x	DeHa 7030x	DeHa 7020x	SaHa 7015x	DeHa 7010x	DeHa 7000x	KuHa 7005x
Weight (t)	38.2	41.2	37.4	34.9	37.5	41.3	38.2
Seating capacity	56	60	64	40	64	60	56

Cars 2, 4, and 6 each have one single-arm pantograph.

== Interior ==
16-seat observation saloons are located at either end of the train, and the side windows of the passenger saloons have one-metre high windows.

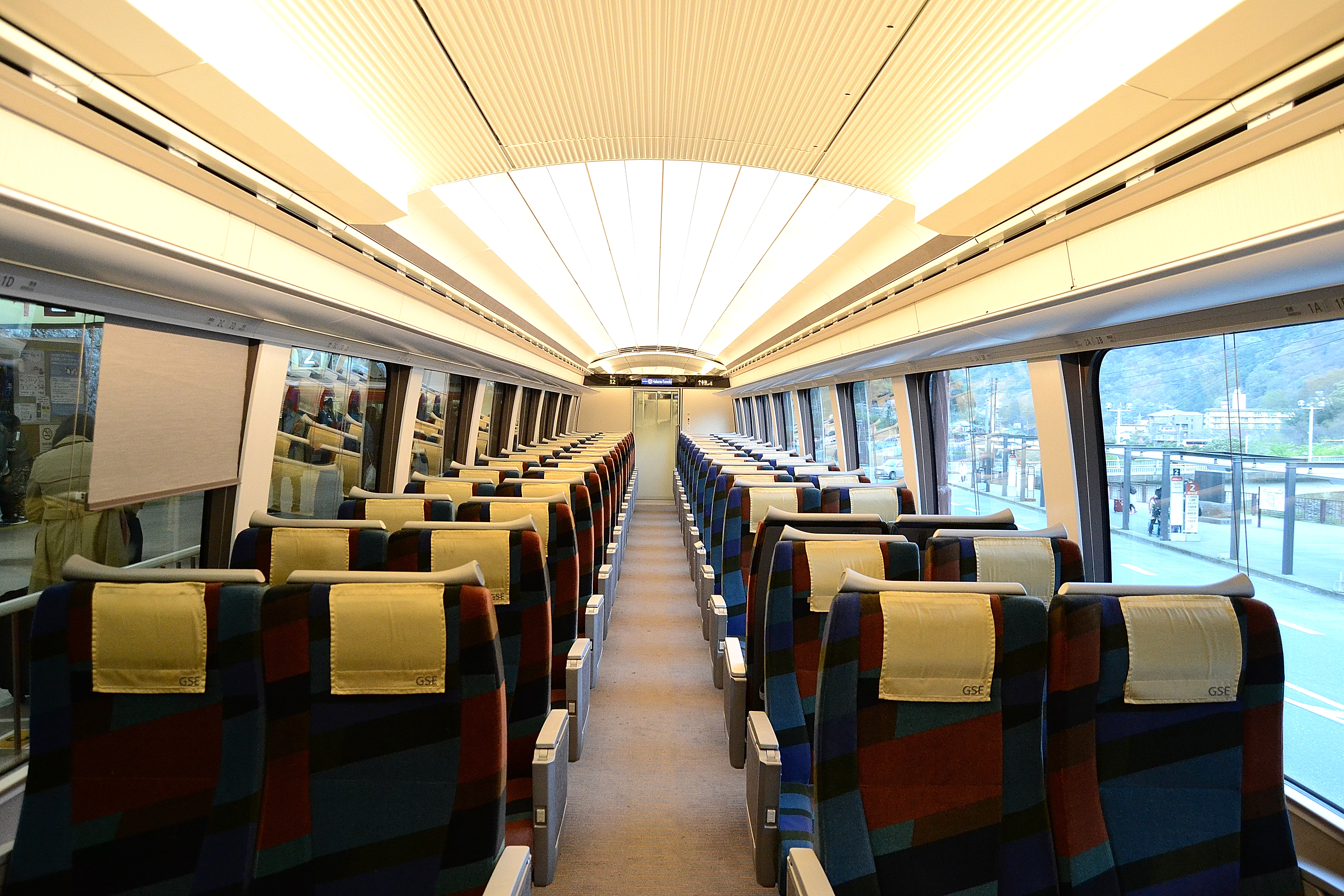
Interior view

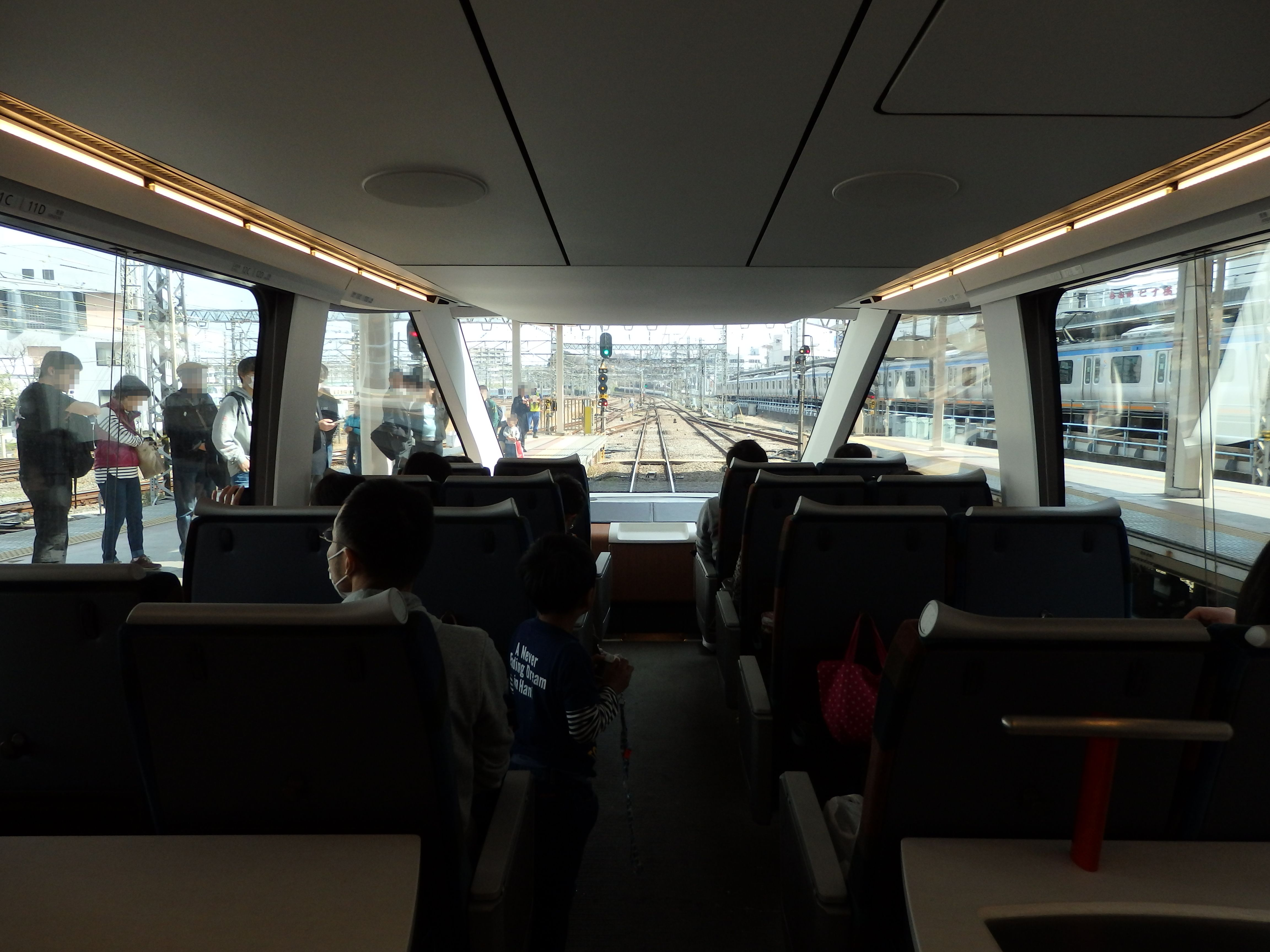
Observation saloon

== History ==
Initial details of the trains on order were published by Odakyu on 20 October 2016.

The first trainset was delivered from Nippon Sharyo in December 2017, and formally unveiled to the media on 5 December 2017. The second set was delivered from Nippon Sharyo in June 2018.

The first set entered service on 17 March 2018, with the second set entering service on 11 July of that year.
