= Yoshiro Okabe =

Japanese engineer (1884–1945)

Yoshiro Okabe, before 1912

Yoshiro Okabe (岡部 芳郎, Okabe Yoshiro; April 9, 1884 – March 17, 1945) was a Japanese engineer and an assistant of Thomas Edison. He worked at Menlo Park from 1904 to 1914. After returning to Japan, Okabe made the short sound film Katyusha (leading actress:Sumako Matsui) using Edison's kinetoscope. He died in 1945 in Kobe in a U.S. air strike.

== Life ==
Okabe was appointed reserve second sublieutenant of the Imperial Japanese Navy and became the first mate on an English ship. He caught typhoid fever while the ship was at anchor in New York. After recovering, he remained in the US and got a job at the Edison Institute in Menlo Park, New Jersey. Okabe was not only an engineer for Edison, but also protected him with his Jujitsu. Edison liked him very much, and brought him camping with Henry Ford and Harvey Samuel Firestone.

Okabe had connections with business, political and noble society in Japan. Viscount Shibusawa Eiichi met Okabe in Menlo Park, in 1909. Baron Okura Kihachiro also supported Okabe in inviting Edison to Japan around 1926. Okabe negotiated with Okura's support, but this attempt was a failure because Edison was busy developing synthetic rubber. Viscount Kaneko Kentarō was a close friend of Okabe. At ceremony held in memory of Edison on January 22, 1931, Kaneko presented Okabe as "Edison introduced me to one Japanese who worked in his secret laboratory, when I visited America to procure war expenditure. He was Honorable Yoshiro Okabe!"

In 1934, Okabe was invited to the unveiling ceremony of a monument of Edison in Otokoyama, Kyoto, because Edison used a filament of bamboo for his first successful light bulb. He was the guest of honor with the Viscount Kaneko as one of Edison's closest Japanese friends.

He established the steel industry in Kobe and made a fortune repairing ships for northern Europe. His business steadily declined before World War II. The Kenpeitai investigated Okabe for espionage because he lived in the US, but it was a false charge. Near the end of the war, Okabe was killed in Kobe during a US air raid.
