= Noriaki Okabe =

Japanese architect (born 1947)

Noriaki Okabe (岡部 憲明, Okabe Noriaki; born December 9, 1947) is a Japanese architect.

He was born in Shizuoka, Japan. He worked with Renzo Piano for twenty years in Europe, from the designing and construction supervision of the Centre Georges Pompidou in Paris.

In 1988, Okabe, then the representative of the Renzo Piano Building Workshop in Japan, won the international competition for the Kansai International Airport Terminal Building and was responsible for the design and construction supervision. While not currently on display, the Museum of Modern Art holds a model of the building's main structural truss in its Architecture and Design department.

After the construction of the Terminal Building, he established the Noriaki Okabe Architecture Network in 1995 in Tokyo. While Okabe's practice has since expanded beyond architecture into industrial design, including the Odakyu 50000 series VSE train. In 2009 he collaborated with Belgian architect Jean-Michel Jaspers in designing the Belgian Embassy in Tokyo.

== Notable projects ==
- Kansai International Airport Terminal Building, Renzo Piano Building Workshop Japan, Osaka
- Ushibuka Haiya Bridge, Renzo Piano Building Workshop Japan, Nagasaki, Japan
- Housing in Sakura-shinmachi, Tokyo, Japan
- Valeo Unisia Transmissions Atsugi (factory), Kanagawa, Japan
- Odakyu 50000 series VSE train design
- Odakyu 60000 series MSE train design
- Belgian Embassy, Tokyo, Japan (collaboration with Belgian landscape architect Aldrik Heirman)
- Hakone Tozan 3000 series train design
- Odakyu 30000 series EXEα train refurbishment programme from fiscal 2016
- Odakyu 70000 series train design
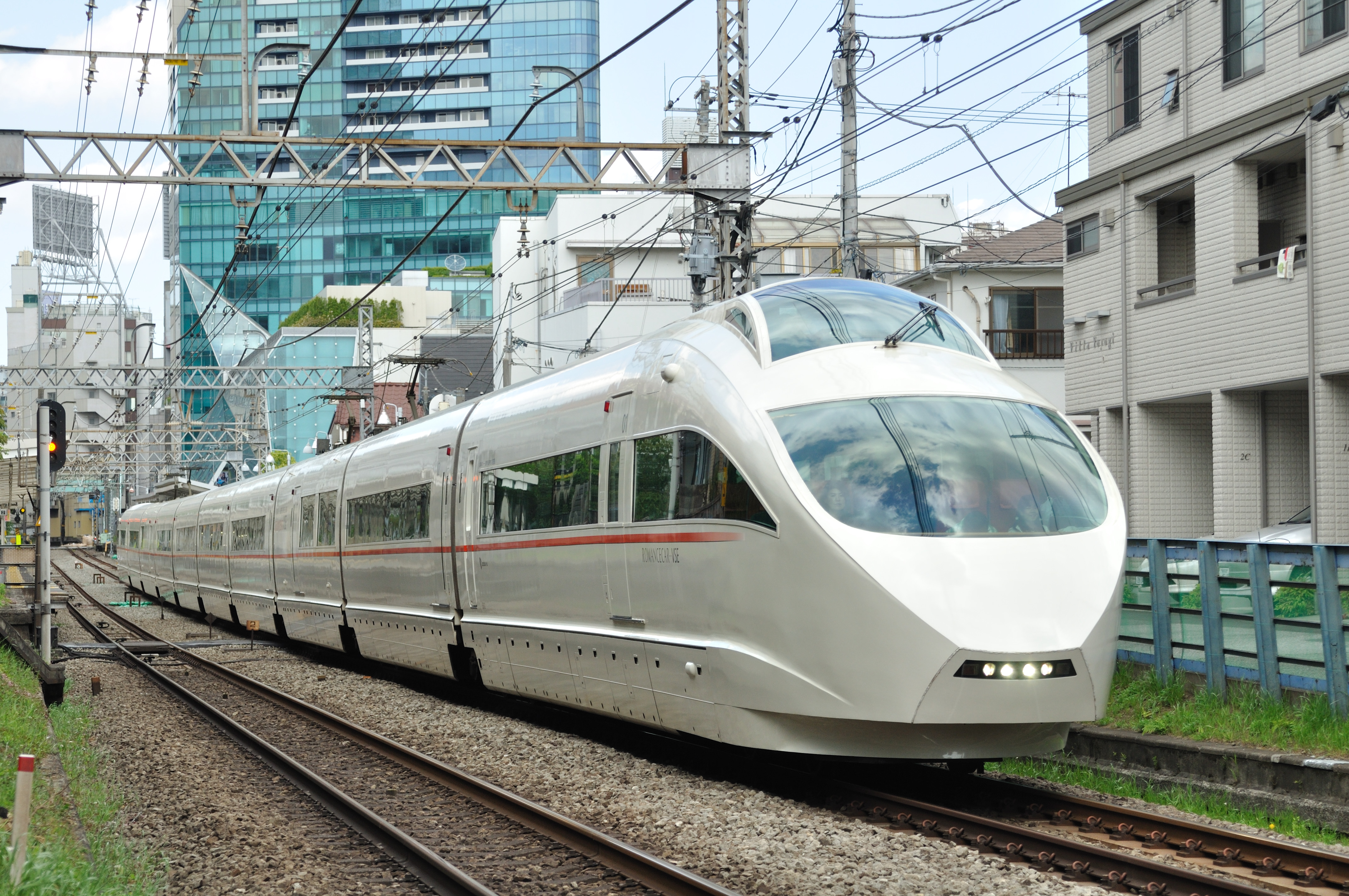
An Odakyu 50000 series train

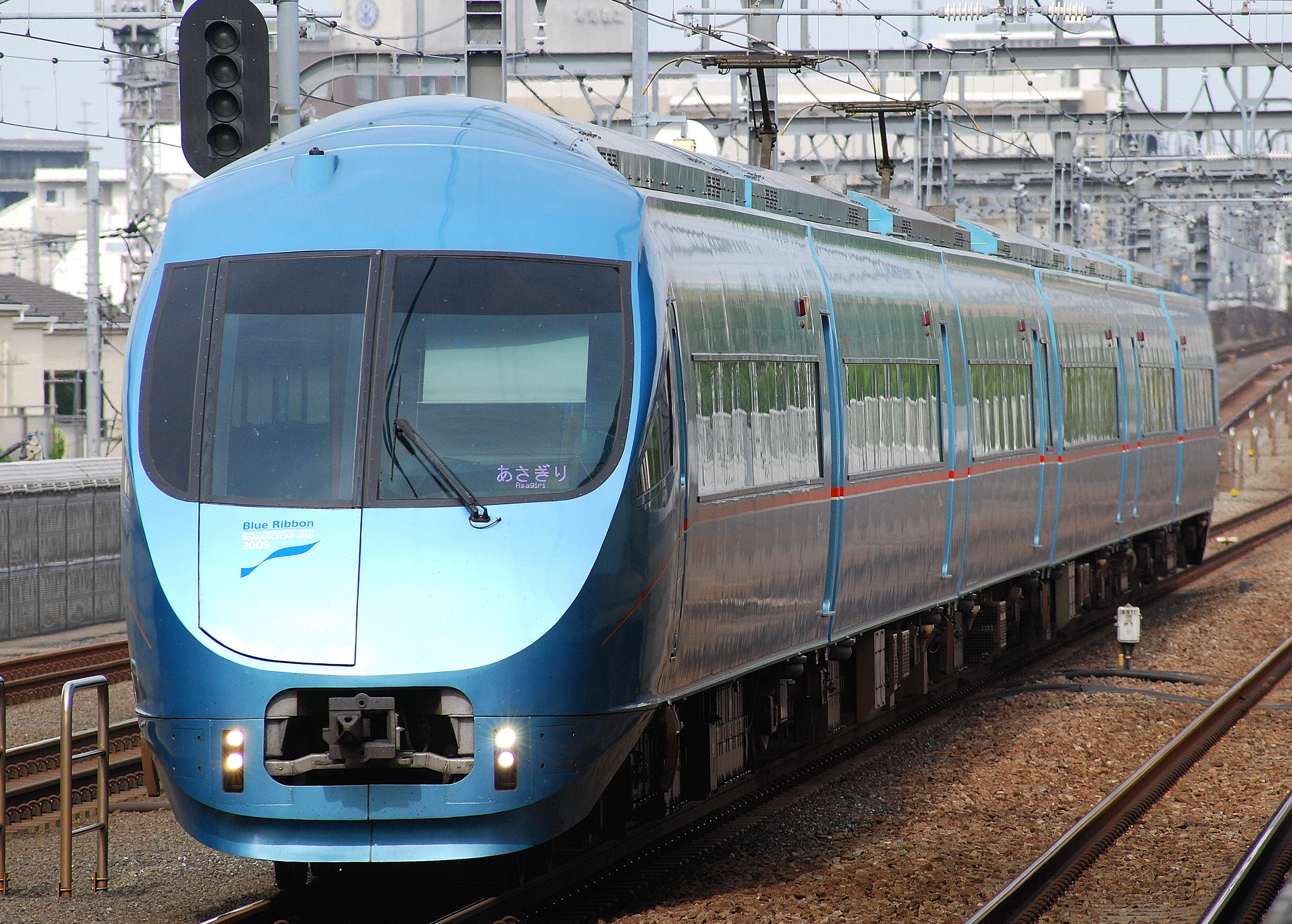
An Odakyu 60000 series train

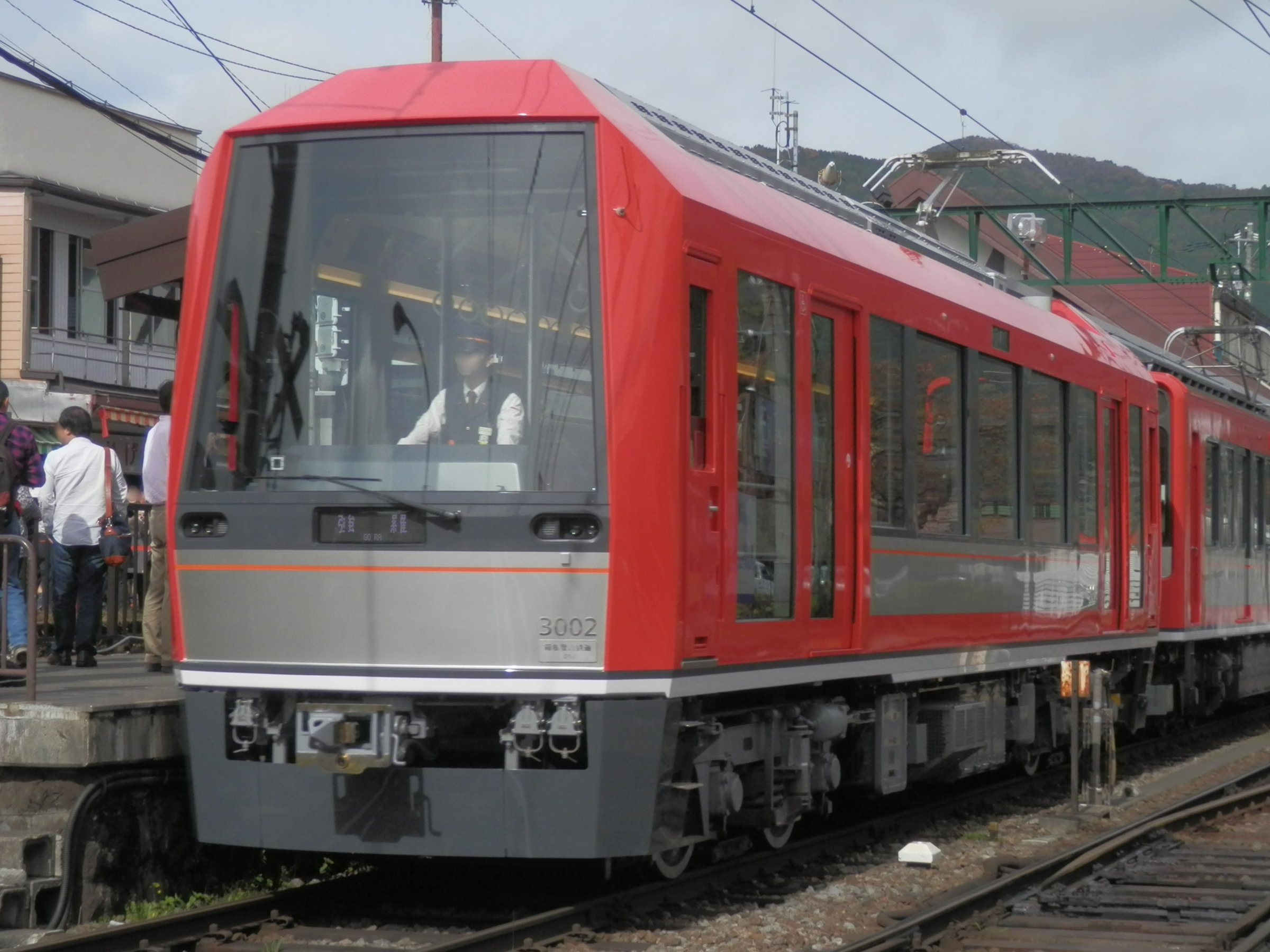
A Hakone Tozan Railway 3000 series train
