= Maruyamachō, Shibuya =

District in Shibuya, Tokyo, Japan

Maruyamachō 円山町
- Neighborhood in Shibuya
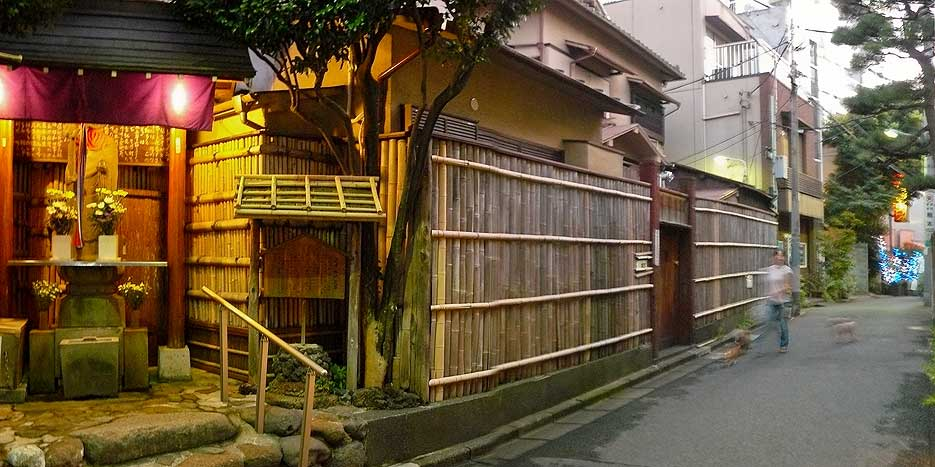
- Interactive map of Maruyamachō
- Country: Japan
- Prefecture: Tokyo
- Special ward: Shibuya

Population (1 October 2020)
  - Total: 2,062
- Time zone: UTC+09:00
- ZIP code: 150-0044
- Telephone area code: 03

Maruyamachō (円山町) is a district of Shibuya, Tokyo, Japan.

As of October 2020, the population of this district is 2,062. The postal code for Maruyamachō is 150–0044.

The nightclub Womb, which featured in the 2006 Alejandro González Iñárritu film Babel, is located here.

== Geography ==
Maruyamachō borders Shōtō in the north, Dōgenzaka to the east, Nanpeidaichō to the south, and Shinsenchō to the west.

== Education ==
Shibuya Board of Education operates public elementary and junior high schools.

All of Maruyamacho is zoned to Jinnan Elementary School (神南小学校), and Shoto Junior High School (松濤中学校).
