= Shōtō, Shibuya =

District in Shibuya, Tokyo, Japan

Coordinates: 35°39′35″N 139°41′37″E

Shōtō 松濤
- Neighborhood in Shibuya
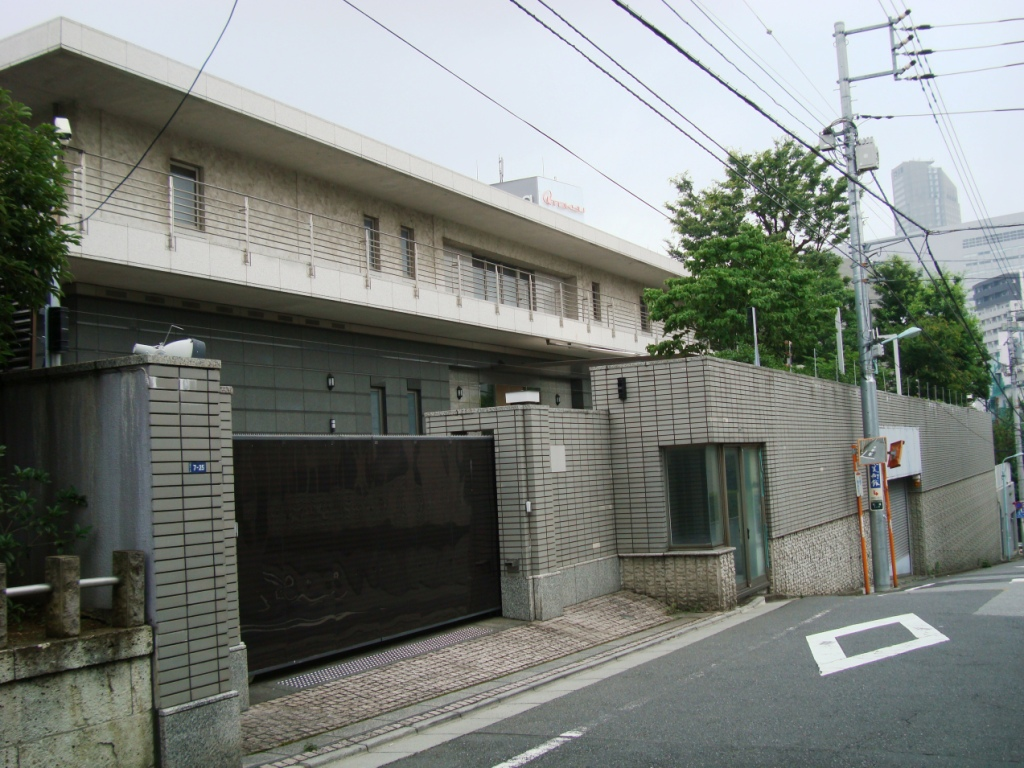
- Guest House of the Governor of Tokyo (now demolished)
- Interactive map of Shōtō
- Country: Japan
- Prefecture: Tokyo
- Special ward: Shibuya

Population (1 October 2020)
  - Total: 3,104
- Time zone: UTC+09:00
- ZIP code: 150-0046
- Telephone area code: 03

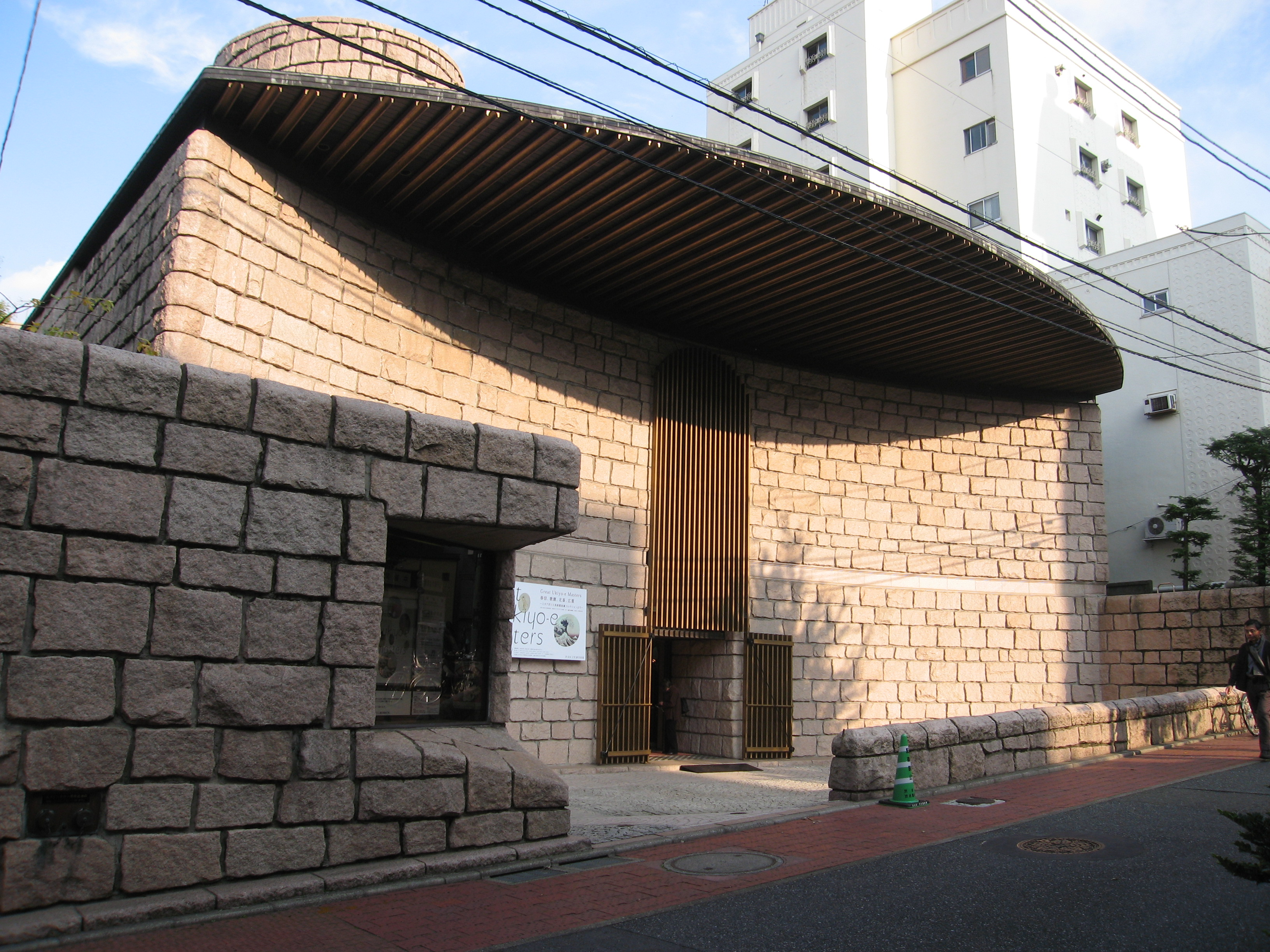
Shoto Museum of Art

Shōtō (松濤) is an upscale residential district of Shibuya, Tokyo, Japan. Located on the southwestern part of Shibuya, this district borders Kamiyamachō on the north, Udagawachō on the east, Dōgenzaka on the southeast, Shinsenchō and Maruyamachō on the south, and Komaba on the west.

== Places of interest ==
=== Cultural ===
==== Museums ====
- Shoto Museum of Art
- Toguri Museum of Art

==== Theatre ====
- Nishino Ballet Troupe Head Office

=== Schools ===
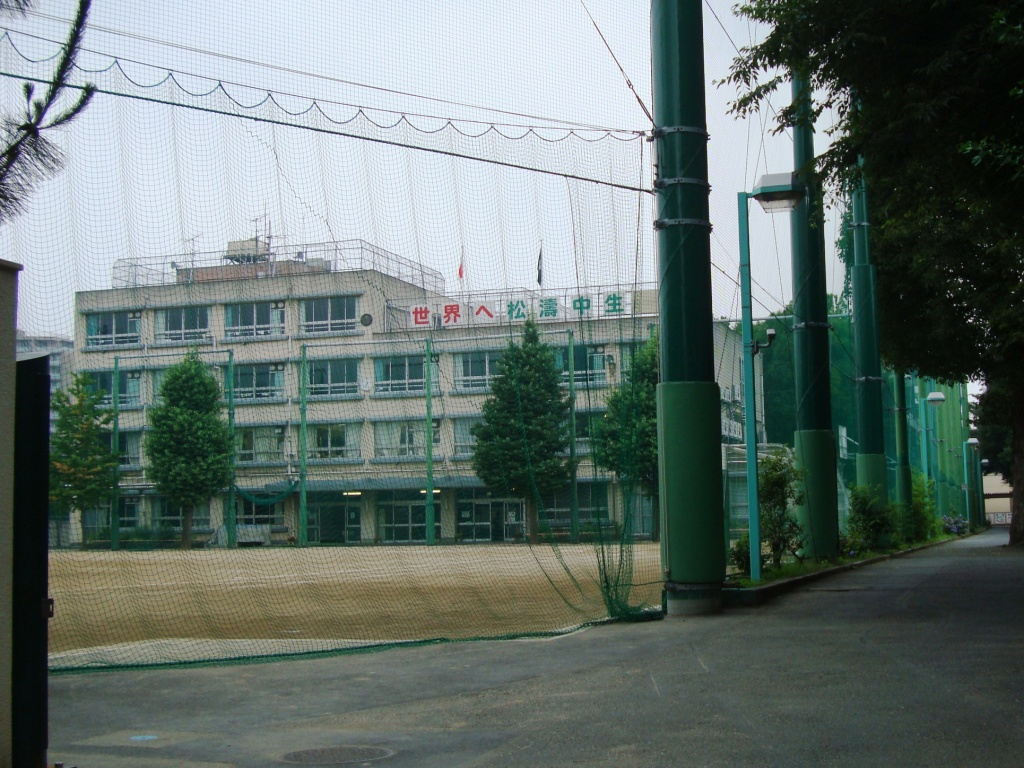
Shoto Junior High School (松濤中学校)

Shibuya Board of Education operates public elementary and junior high schools. All of Shoto (1 and 2 chome) is zoned to Jinnan Elementary School (神南小学校), and Shoto Junior High School (松濤中学校).

Educational institutions in Shoto:

- Shoto Junior High School
- Yamazaki University of Animal Nursing Shibuya campus

=== Other ===
- Unification Movement Japan Headquarters
- Nabeshima Shoto Park
- Guest House of the Governor of Tokyo (now demolished)
- Former location of the Kanze Noh Theatre (now in Ginza)

== Transportation ==
The nearest station is Shinsen Station, on the Keio Inokashira Line.
