= Real Sound (website) =

Japanese entertainment news website

- Home page of Real Sound in September 2026
- Native name: リアルサウンド
- Romanized name: Riaru Saundo
- Website type: News website
- Available in: Japanese
- Headquarters: Dōgenzaka, Shibuya, Tokyo, Japan
- Owner: Blueprint Inc.
- Editor: Kōichi Kamiya
- Website: realsound.jp
- Advertising: yes
- Commercial: yes
- Registration: optional
- Launched: July 22, 2013; 13 years ago

Real Sound (Japanese: リアルサウンド, Hepburn: Riaru Saundo) is a Japanese entertainment news website. It was founded in 2013 by Kōichi Kamiya and Cyzo before becoming independent in 2016.

== Overview ==
The website was founded on July 22, 2013, by Cyzo with the help of Kōichi Kamiya, a former editor at the music magazine Rockin'On Japan. He created the website because news articles dominated music information websites, such as Natalie, during the early 2010s, so Real Sound focused on reviews and interviews. He reportedly wanted to "explore the possibilities of a music criticism that had not been pursued on the web," adding that they predict that "the process to update the critical spirit once embodied by music magazines for the internet age" is beginning, citing the rise of bloggers involved in music criticism.

The website's articles were first aggregated on Yahoo! News Japan on October 2, 2013. By October 29, 2013, the website received 10 million views per month. However, views for the website's "review" section performed poorly, with Kamiya citing that few Japanese users actually want album reviews.

Real Sound Movie was launched in August 2015. In 2016, Real Sound became independent following the acquisition of the trademark and operating rights from Cyzo. Real Sound Tech was launched in March 2018. Real Sound Book was launched in September 2019. By January 2025, the website received 100 million page views per month, including content aggregated to Yahoo Japan and Line.

In addition to music, the website also has a dedicated page for movies (Real Sound Movie), books (Real Sound Book), and technology (Real Sound Tech). As of January 2025, Real Sound publishes 80 to 100 articles per day, including news, interviews, and columns.

Real Sound was owned by Blueprint Inc. It is headquartered in Dōgenzaka, Shibuya, Tokyo. The current editor-in-chief is Kōichi Kamiya. As of January 2025, the company has 27 employees and 150 to 200 freelance writers.
