= Yoyogikamizonochō =

District in Shibuya, Tokyo, Japan

Yoyogikamizonochō 代々木神園町
- Neighborhood in Shibuya
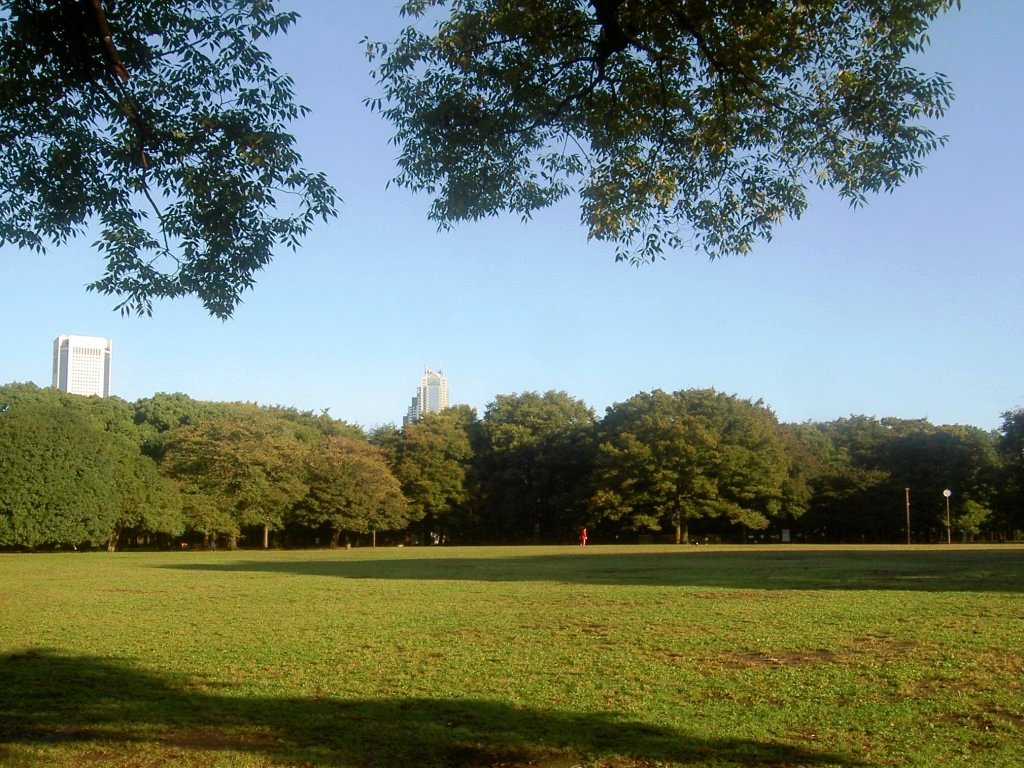
- Yoyogi Park
- Interactive map of Yoyogikamizonochō
- Coordinates: 35°40′29″N 139°41′36″E
- Country: Japan
- Prefecture: Tokyo
- Special ward: Shibuya

Population (住民基本台帳・外国人登録による人口)
  - Total: 118
- Time zone: UTC+09:00
- ZIP code: 151-0052
- Telephone area code: 03

Yoyogikamizonochō (代々木神園町) is a district of Shibuya, Tokyo, Japan.

As of October 2020, the population of this district is 118. The postal code for Yoyogikamizonochō is 151-0052.

== Geography ==
Yoyogikamizonochō borders Yoyogi in the north and west, Sendagaya to the east, and Jinnan to the south.

== Education ==
Shibuya Board of Education operates public elementary and junior high schools.

Yoyogikamizonochō 1 is zoned to Sendagaya Elementary School (千駄谷小学校). Yoyogikamizonochō 2 is zoned to Jinnan Elementary School (神南小学校). Yoyogikamizonochō 3-4 is zoned to Yoyogi Sanya Elementary School (代々木山谷小学校).

Yoyogikamizonochō 1 is zoned to Harajuku Gaien Junior High School (原宿外苑中学校). Yoyogikamizonochō 2 is zoned to Shoto Junior High School (松濤中学校). Yoyogikamizonochō 3-4 is zoned to Yoyogi Junior High School (代々木中学校).
