= Shibuya University Network =

The Shibuya University Network (シブヤ大学, Shibuya daigaku), founded in 2006 in Japan, is not a university or college in the traditional sense but a new system of education in the local community of Shibuya, Tokyo. The school is led by Yasuaki Sakyo, a 28-year-old ex-accountant. There are no entrance examinations; classes take place in the city's surroundings; and teachers come from all walks of life.

== See also ==
- Shibuya, Tokyo
- Alternative education
- Alternative school
- Alternative university
- Autodidacticism
- Democratic school
- Deschooling
- Education
- Anarchist free school
- Gifted education
- School
- Special education
- Unschooling
- John Dewey
