= Shibuya =

Special ward in Tokyo, Japan

Shibuya 渋谷区
- Special ward
- Shibuya City
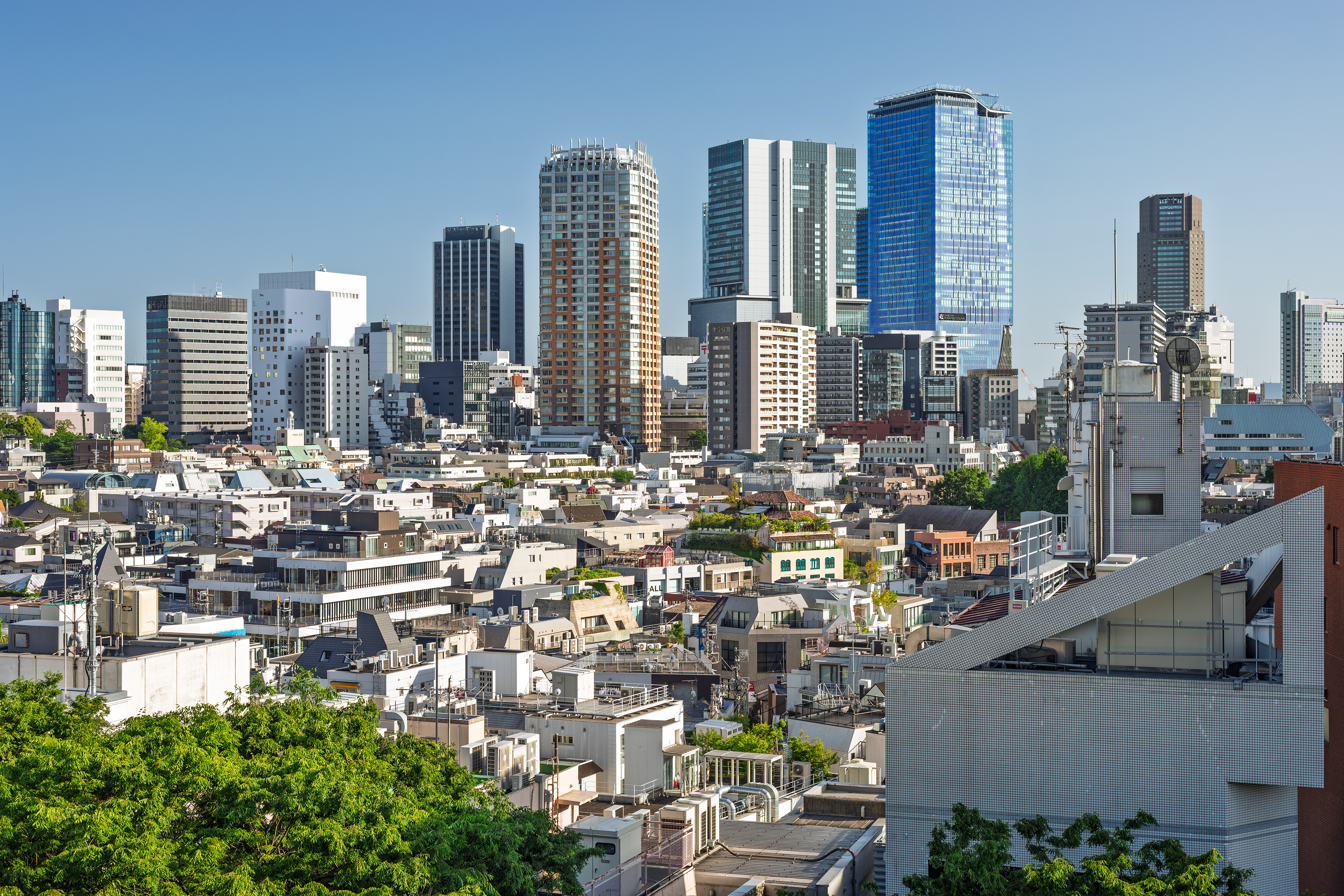
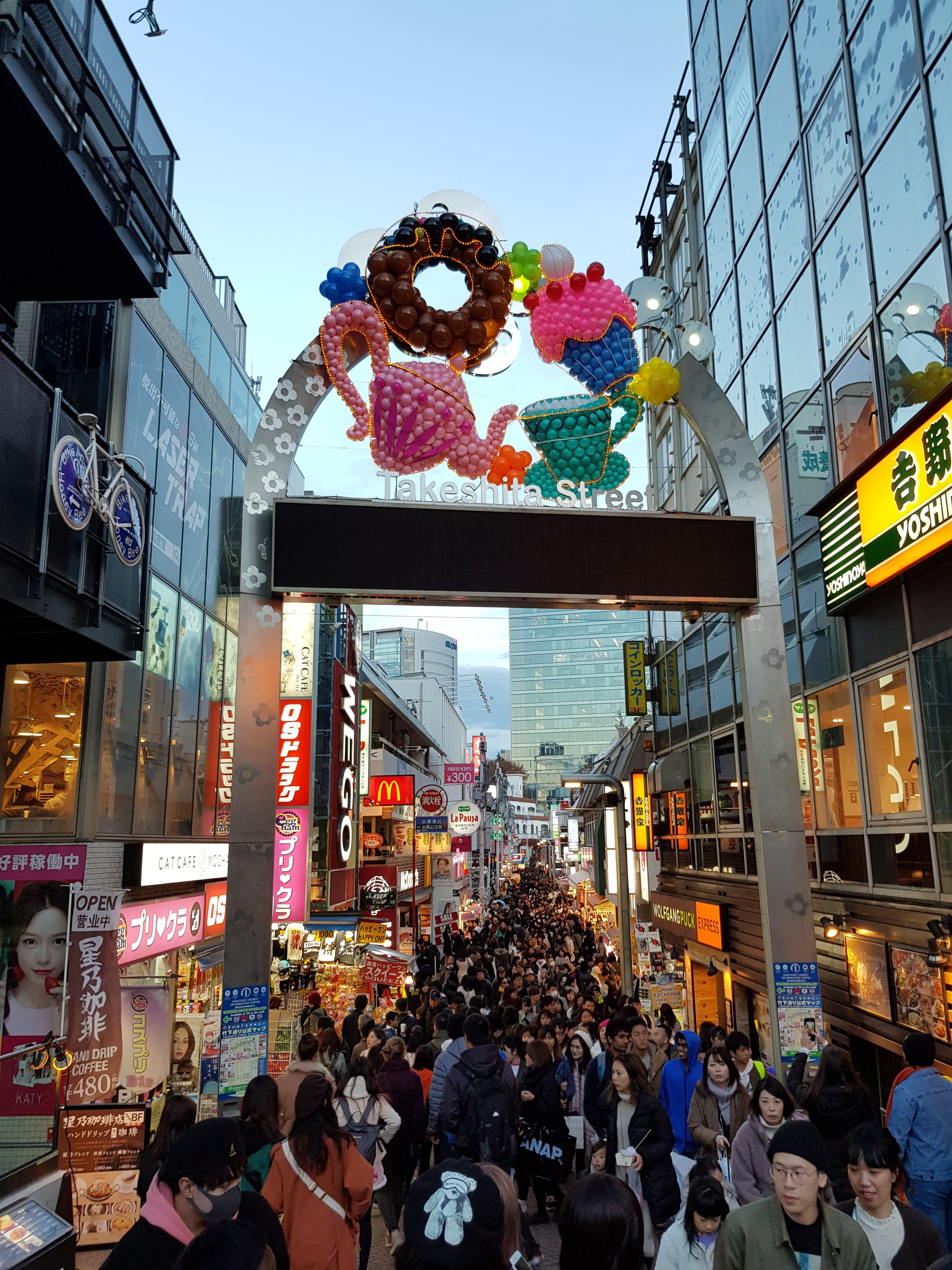
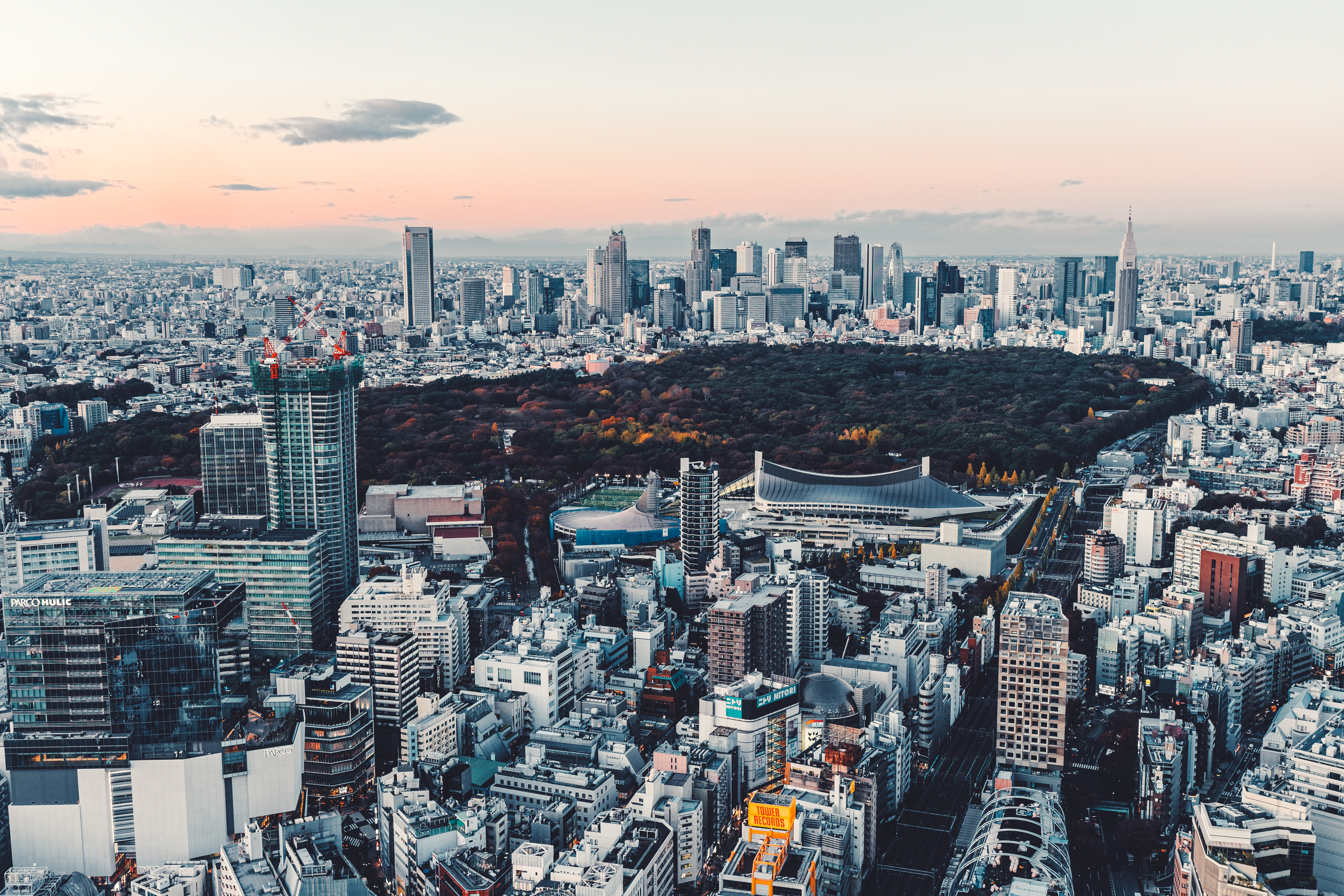
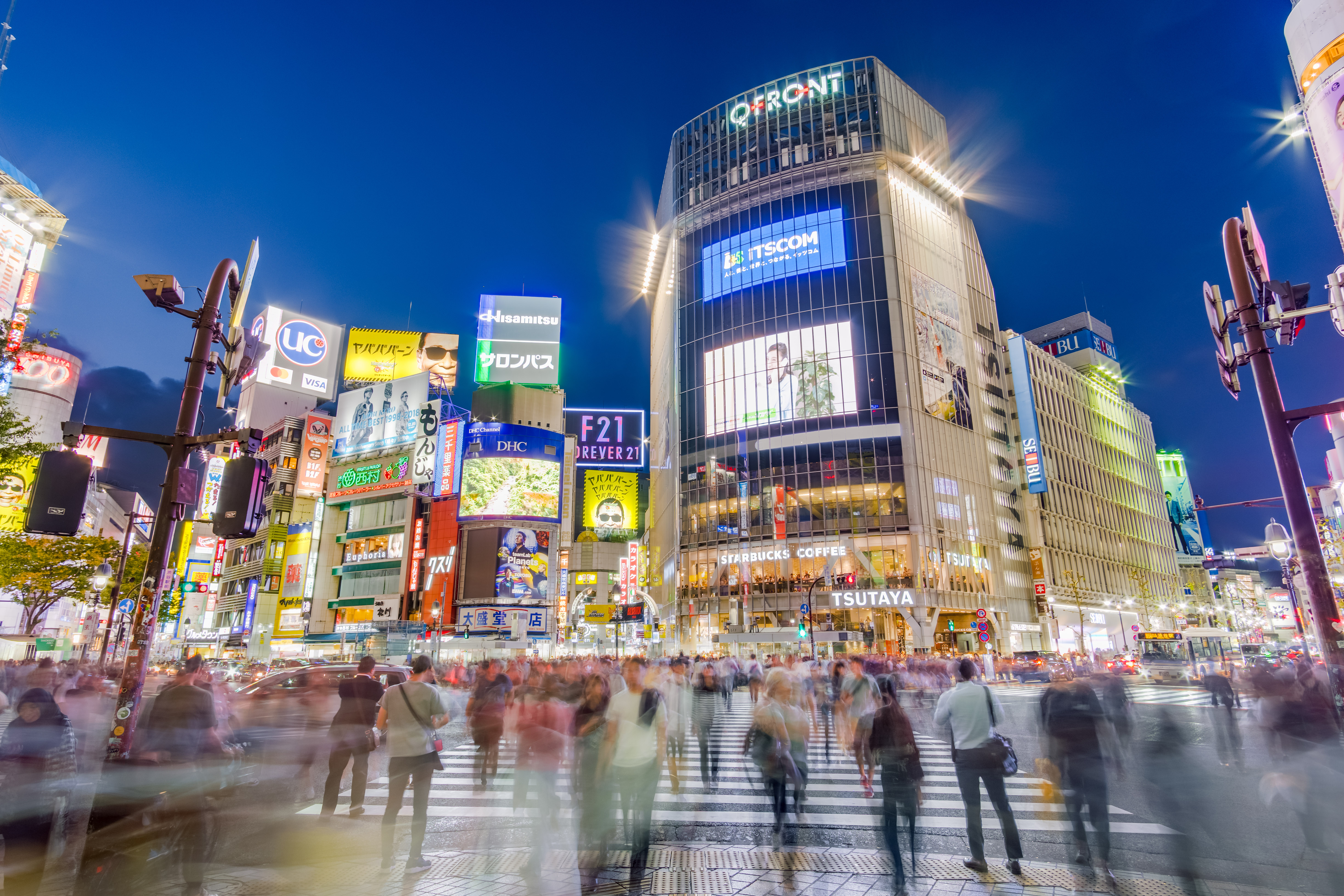
- Skyline in 2024 Takeshita Street in Harajuku Yoyogi Park Shibuya Crossing

- Flag Seal

- Location of Shibuya in Tokyo

- Shibuya (Tokyo) Shibuya (Kanto Area) Shibuya (Japan)
- Coordinates: 35°39′34″N 139°42′02″E
- Country: Japan
- Region: Kantō
- Prefecture: Tokyo

Government
  - Mayor: Ken Hasebe (since April 2015)

Area
  - Total: 15.11 km^{2} (5.83 sq mi)

Population (October 1, 2020)
  - Total: 243,883
  - Estimate (2024): 230,609
  - Density: 16,140/km^{2} (41,800/sq mi)
- Time zone: UTC+9 (Japan Standard Time)
- Symbols
  - Tree: Zelkova serrata
  - Flower: Iris ensata
- City office: Shibuya 1-18-21, Shibuya-ku, Tokyo 150-8010
- Website: www.city.shibuya.tokyo.jp

Shibuya (渋谷区, Shibuya-ku; IPA: [ɕì.bɯ̈́.jä́(.kɯ̈̀)] (Note: The placename is only pronounced like this. The family name is prnounced [ɕí.bɯ̈̀.jä̀].)) is a special ward in Tokyo, Japan. A major commercial center, Shibuya houses two of the busiest railway stations in the world, Shibuya Station and Shinjuku Station (southern half).

As of January 1, 2024, Shibuya has an estimated population of 230,609 in 142,443 households and a population density of 15,262.01 people per square kilometer (39,528.4 people/mi^{2}). The total area is 15.11 km^{2} (5.83 sq mi). Notable neighborhoods and districts of Shibuya include Harajuku, Ebisu, Omotesandō, Yoyogi and Sendagaya.

Shibuya came into the possession of the Shibuya clan in the early 1160s, after which the area was named. The branch of the clan that ruled this area was defeated by the Later Hōjō clan on January 13, 1524, during the Sengoku period, and the area then came under their control. During the Edo period, Shibuya, particularly Maruyamachō on Dōgenzaka, prospered as a town on Oyama Road (present-day Route 246), and in the Meiji era, as a Hanamachi. Shibuya emerged as a railway terminus during the expansion of the railway network beginning in the 19th century, and was incorporated as a ward in the City of Tokyo on October 1, 1932.

Shibuya, once a mediocre area developed around the railway terminus, overtook Shinjuku as a hub for youth culture in the 1970s. The coinciding competition between Seibu (whose most notable development projects include Shibuya Parco) and Tokyu (Tokyu Hands, Shibuya 109) to develop the area as a commercial center added to its appeal to young people, which in turn spread to other neighborhoods in the ward, such as Harajuku. Since 2010, the area surrounding Shibuya Station has been undergoing large-scale redevelopment, with the entire project scheduled for completion in fiscal year 2034 (April 2034 to March 2035).

Internationally recognized tourist attractions include the Shibuya Crossing, known as the busiest pedestrian crossing in the world, the panoramic view of the city from the rooftop of Shibuya Scramble Square, and the statue of Hachikō.

== History ==
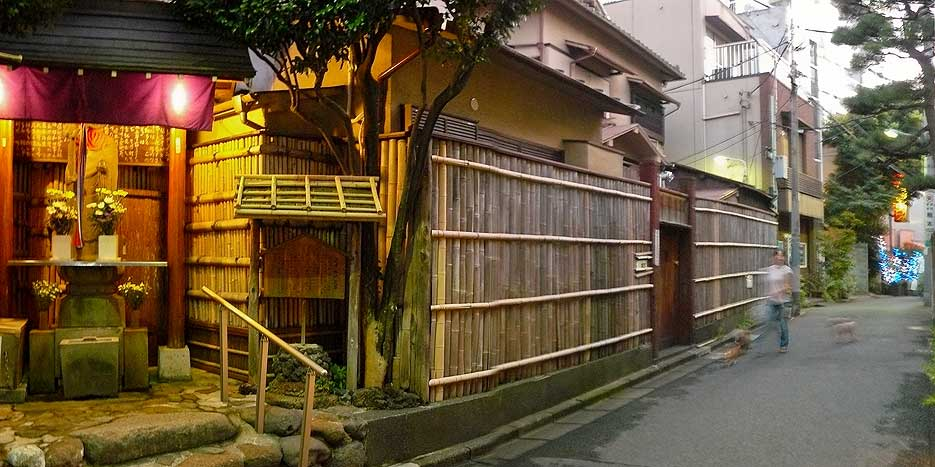
Maruyamachō was the commercial center of the area in the Edo period.

Shibuya came into the possession of the Shibuya clan in the early 1160s, after which the area was named. The clan was a cadet branch of the Taira clan descended from Taira no Yoshifumi. The clan built a fortress near the present-day Konnō Hachimangu Shrine. The branch of the clan that ruled this area was defeated by the Later Hōjō clan on January 13, 1524, during the Sengoku period, and the area then came under their control. During the Edo period, Shibuya, particularly Maruyamachō on Dōgenzaka, prospered as a town on Oyama Road (present-day Route 246), and in the Meiji era, as a Hanamachi.

The village of Shibuya was incorporated in 1889 by the merger of the villages of Kami-Shibuya, Naka-Shibuya and Shimo-Shibuya within Minami-Toshima County (Toyotama County from 1896). The village covered the territory of modern-day Shibuya Station area as well as the Hiroo, Daikanyama, Aoyama, and Ebisu areas. Shibuya became a town in 1909. The town of Shibuya merged with the neighboring towns of Sendagaya (which included the modern Senda, Harajuku and Jingumae areas) and Yoyohata (which included the modern Yoyogi and Hata areas) to form Shibuya-ku suburban ward upon being absorbed into Tokyo City in 1932. Shibuya became an urban special ward under the Local Autonomy Act in 1947.

The Tokyu Toyoko Line opened in 1932, making Shibuya a key terminal between Tokyo and Yokohama, and was joined by the forerunner of the Keio Inokashira Line in 1933 and the forerunner of the Tokyo Metro Ginza Line in 1938. The story of Hachikō, a dog who waited for his deceased master at Shibuya Station every day from 1923 to 1935, created a national sensation due to his unwavering loyalty. A statue of Hachikō was built adjacent to the station, and the surrounding Hachikō Square is now one of the most popular meeting points in the area.

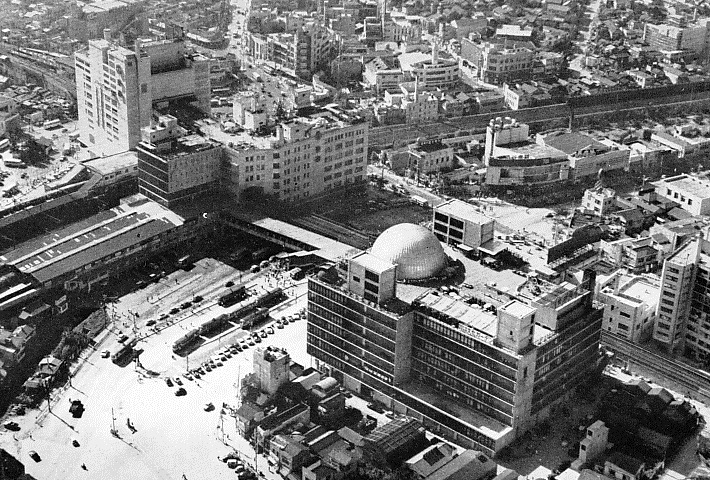
Aerial photo of Shibuya Station, c. 1960

During the occupation of Japan, Yoyogi Park was used as a housing compound for U.S. personnel known as "Washington Heights". The U.S. military left in 1964, and much of the park was repurposed as venues for the 1964 Summer Olympics. The ward itself served as part of the athletics 50 km walk and marathon course during the 1964 games.

In the mid-1990s, Shibuya-kei, a microgenre of pop music, became mainstream in Japan. Distinguished by a "cut-and-paste" approach, it peaked in the late 1990s and declined after its principal players began moving onto other music styles.

Since the beginning of the 21st century, large-scale redevelopment has been underway in the area surrounding Shibuya Station. The scale of the project has been described as something that happens once in a hundred years. In 2005, the Japanese government designated the district as an Urban Renewal Area. Following discussions among scholars, the Ministry of Land, Infrastructure, Transport and Tourism, the Tokyo Metropolitan Government, Shibuya City Office, and railway operators such as Tokyu Corporation, JR East, and Tokyo Metro, a master plan was announced in 2008. In 2010, the Tokyo Metropolitan Government approved the implementation of the redevelopment plan, and full-scale construction officially began. As part of the redevelopment, the existing station facilities were demolished. The Tōyoko Line was moved underground, the Ginza Line platform was relocated, and the Saikyō Line platform was placed parallel to the Yamanote Line platform. Several existing commercial buildings were also demolished and replaced by high-rise complexes such as Shibuya Hikarie, Shibuya Stream, Shibuya Fukuras (ja), Shibuya Sakura Stage (ja), and Shibuya Scramble Square. Because railway operations had to continue during construction, and because the pedestrian network plan around the station was revised during the process, the overall completion of the redevelopment is now scheduled for fiscal year 2034, which is seven years later than originally planned.

Miyashita Park closed in 2017 and reopened in July 2020 as a shopping complex with a rooftop park.

== Geography ==
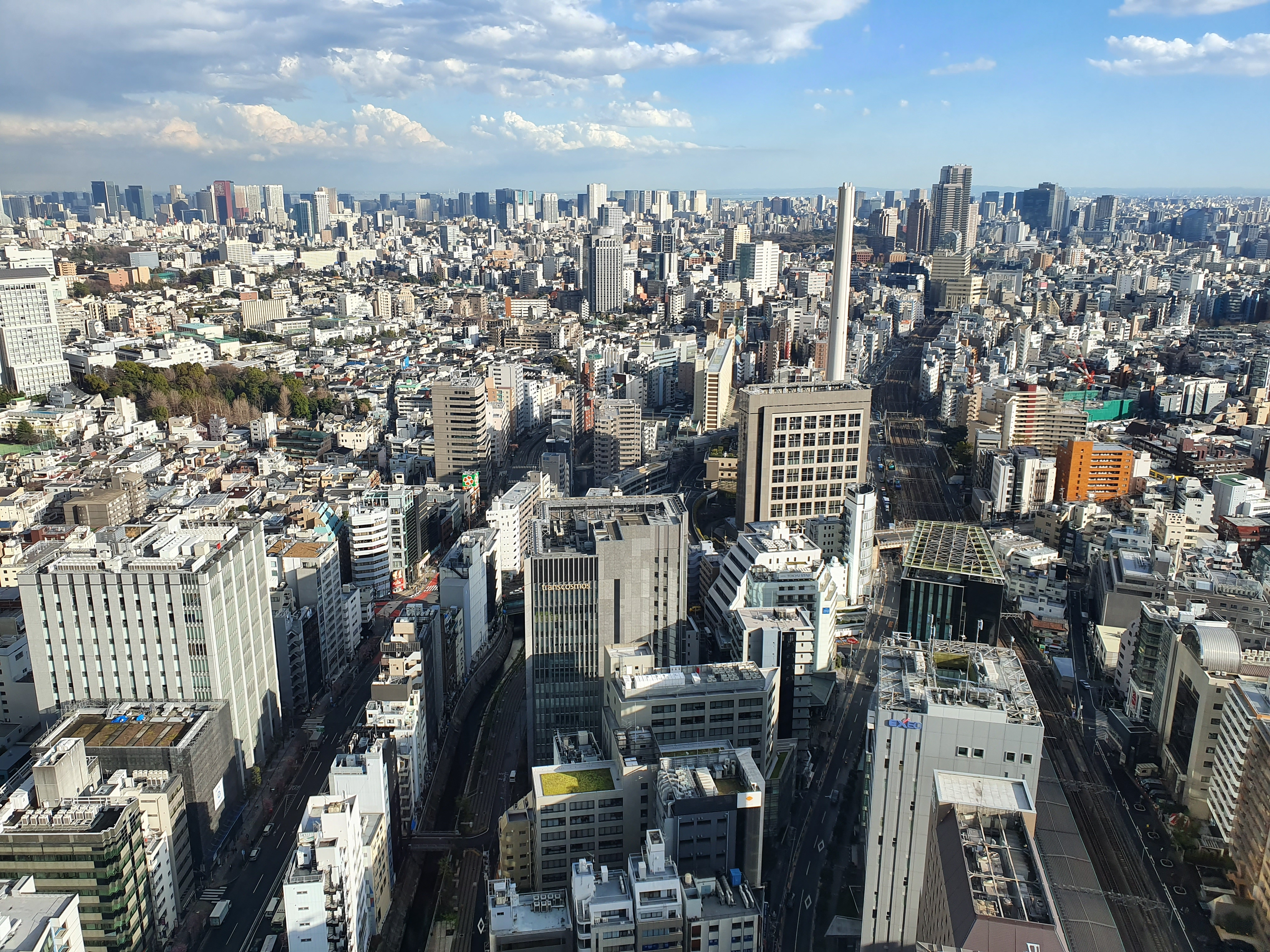
South of Shibuya in 2020

Shibuya includes many well-known commercial and residential districts such as Daikanyama, Ebisu, Harajuku, Hiroo, Higashi, Omotesandō, Sendagaya, and Yoyogi.

=== Districts ===
- Hatagaya Area:
  - Sasazuka, Hatagaya, Honmachi
- Yoyogi Area:
  - Uehara, Ōyamachō, Nishihara, Hatsudai, Motoyoyogichō, Tomigaya, Yoyogikamizonochō, Yoyogi
- Sendagaya Area:
  - Sendagaya, Jingūmae
- Ebisu-Ōmukai Area:
  - Kamiyamachō, Jinnan, Udagawachō, Shōtō, Shinsenchō, Maruyamachō, Dōgenzaka, Nanpeidaichō, Sakuragaokachō, Hachiyamachō, Uguisudanichō, Sarugakuchō, Daikan'yamachō, Ebisunishi, Ebisuminami
- Hikawa-Shimbashi Area:
  - Shibuya, Higashi, Ebisu, Hiroo

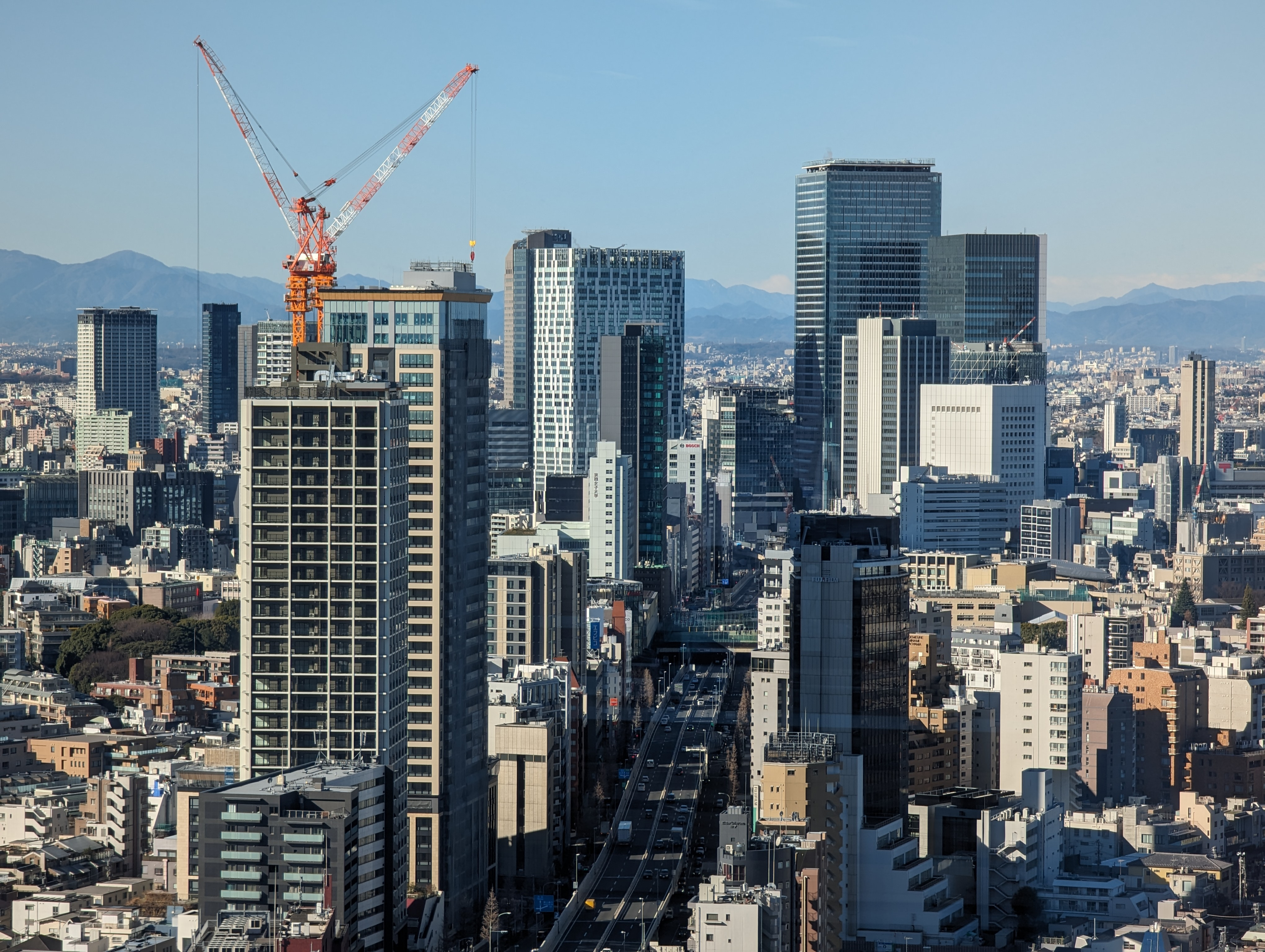
Shibuya seen from Roppongi Hills Mori Tower

== Demographics ==
Per Japanese census data, the population is rising again after decline between 1960 and 2000.

Historical population
Year	Pop.	±%
1920	137,207	—
1930	213,533	+55.6%
1940	256,706	+20.2%
1945	84,067	−67.3%
1950	181,244	+115.6%
1960	282,687	+56.0%
1970	274,491	−2.9%
1980	247,035	−10.0%
1990	205,625	−16.8%
2000	196,682	−4.3%
2010	204,492	+4.0%
2020	243,883	+19.3%
Source: Censuses

== Politics and government ==
Shibuya is run by a city assembly of 34 elected members. The mayor is Ken Hasebe, an independent.

=== Elections ===
- 2003 Shibuya mayoral election

=== Same-sex partnership certificate ===
In 2015, as the council passed "Ordinance for Promoting Respect of Gender Equality and Diversity in the Ward", Shibuya Ward became the first Japanese municipality that issues same-sex partnership certificates. According to this ordinance, same-sex couples who live in Shibuya are allowed "to rent apartments together, and have gained hospital visitation rights as family members". The ordinance was intended to bring three benefits to same-sex couples: "(1) rental housing within the ward (co-signing of tenancy agreements for municipal/public housing), (2) medical institutions within the ward (hospital visitation and medical decision-making rights as family members), and (3) employment conditions within the ward (e.g. family benefits, congratulations and condolence leave)". In order to apply for the certificate, couples must be 20-years-old or older residents of Shibuya Ward and have to state that "their relationship is based on love and mutual trust" in a notarized document. Koyuki Higashi (a former member of the Takarazuka Revue) and Hiroko Masuhara (an entrepreneur), a lesbian couple, were the first to receive this certification. Since the Shibuya Ward passed the ordinance, seven other municipalities in Japan have begun offering similar certificates.

The BBC notes that in practice, the ordinance is not binding, though their names will be posted on the ward's website if they violate the ordinance. Shimizu says the system "is not equivalent to marriage, as it does not accord same-sex couples the same rights as heterosexual couples when it comes to inheritance, joint filing of taxes, or social welfare". As it requires at least a hundred thousand yen to apply for the certificate, it can be restrictive to some couples. Shimizu argues that Shibuya Ward has been criticized for pinkwashing as "while passing this ordinance, the administration also moved to expel the homeless in Miyashita Park and other parks in the ward". Pointing out that the mayor of Shibuya Ward in an interview stated that this is not a matter of human rights, but of diversity, Yuri Horie claimed that the term of diversity seems to be used to divide citizens into the good and the bad; it raises only the ones who contribute to the consumeristic society as representer of "diversity of sexuality" while excluding the useless ones. Yuki Tsuchiya, a lesbian activist, also argues that LGBT individuals are used to promote the ward.

== Sightseeing and local landmarks ==
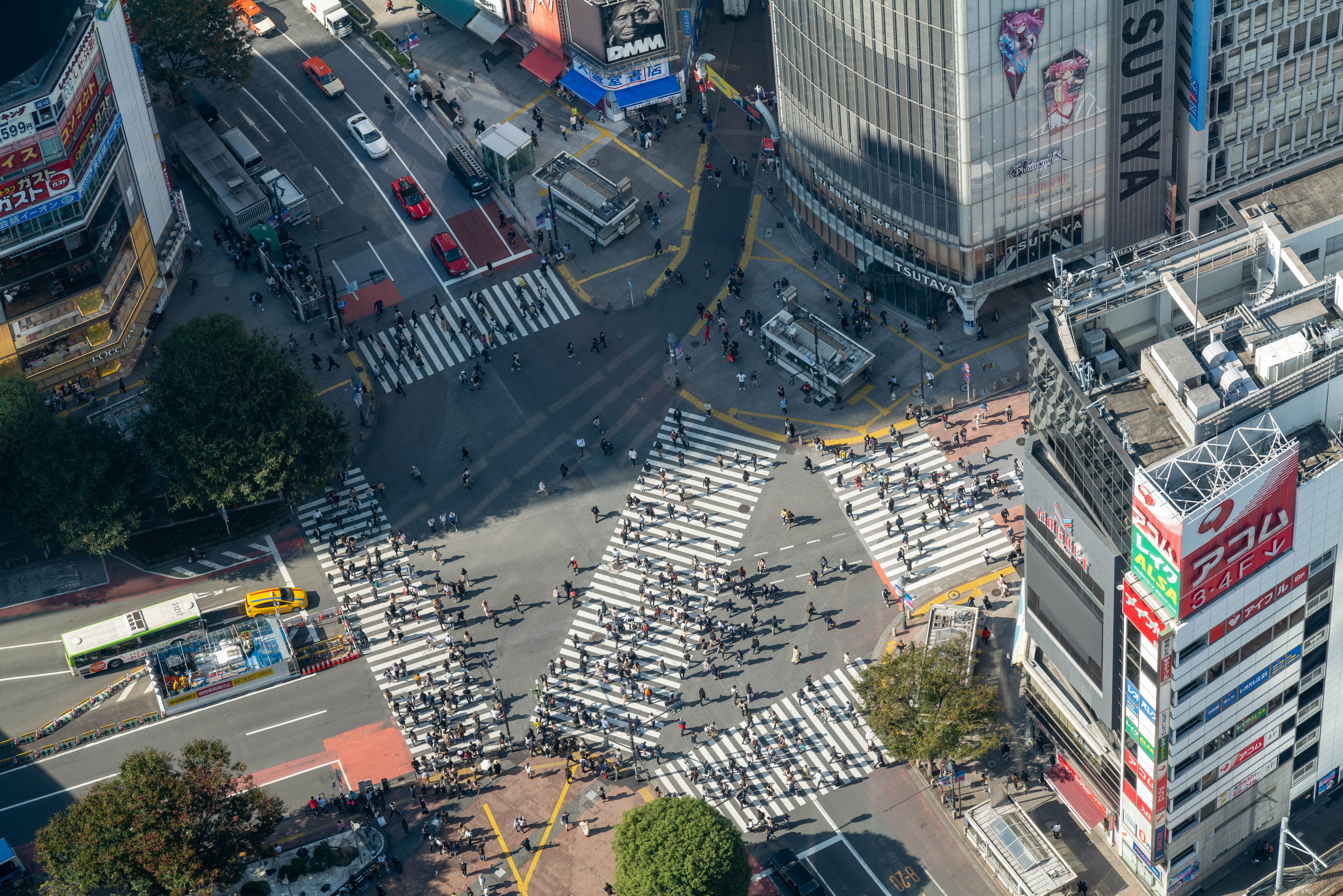
Shibuya's scramble crossing from Shibuya Sky observation deck

Shibuya is famous for its scramble crossing, called Shibuya Crossing. It is located in front of the Shibuya Station Hachikō exit and stops vehicles in all directions to allow pedestrians to inundate the entire intersection. Shibuya Crossing is the "world's busiest pedestrian crossing", with upwards of 3,000 people at a time. A statue of the dog Hachikō, remembered for his unwavering loyalty to his deceased owner, is installed outside Shibuya Station. The statue and its surrounding Hachikō Square are a common meeting place and are almost always crowded. On the southwest side of Shibuya Station, there is a Moyai statue, given to Shibuya by the people of Niijima Island in 1980.

=== Green areas ===
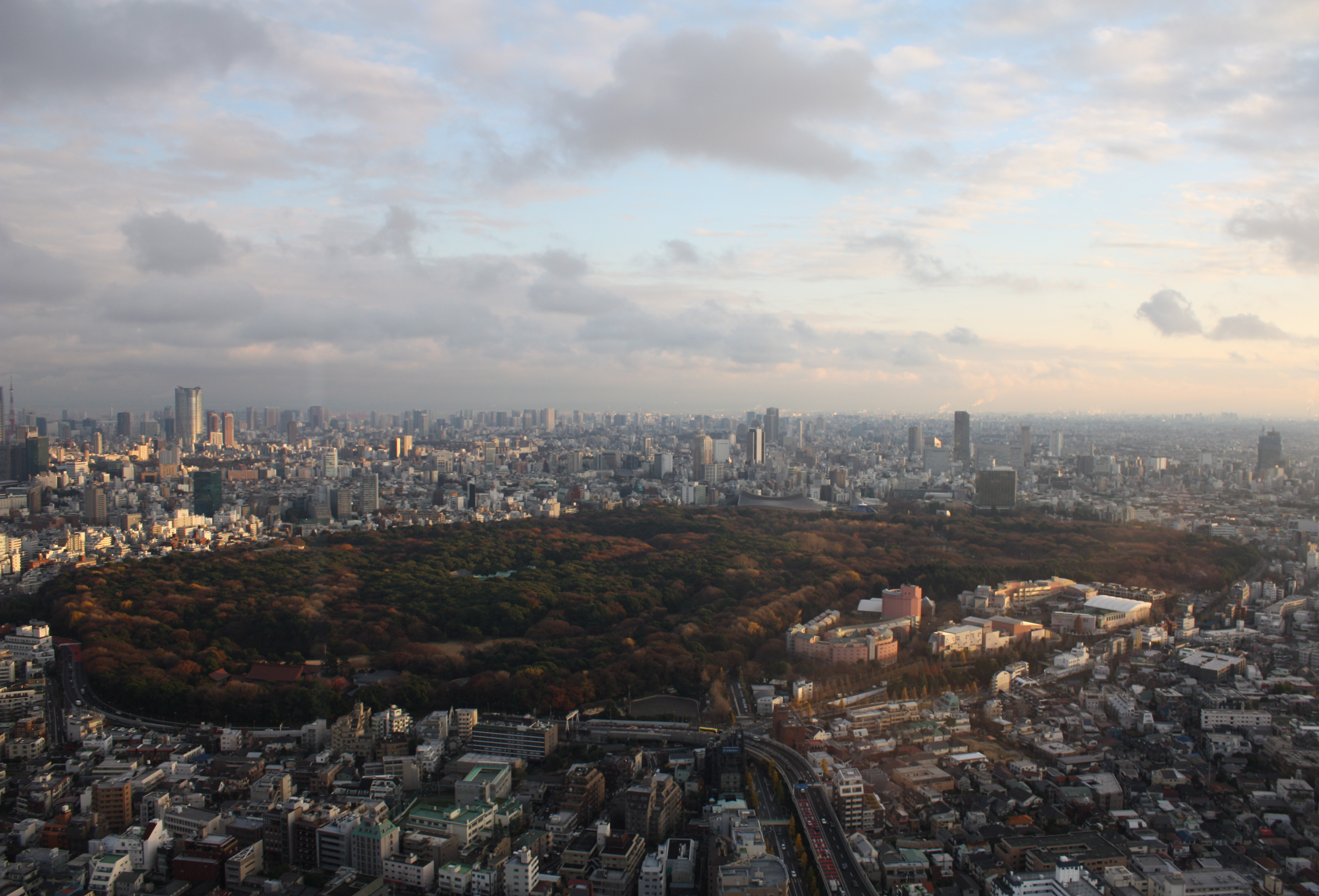
Yoyogi Park

- Shinjuku Gyo-en, former Imperial gardens now open to the public as a park
- Yoyogi Park, once a training base for the Imperial Japanese Army, later the Washington Heights housing area for the Occupation of Japan, then the lodgings for contestants in the 1964 Tokyo Olympics

=== Commercial complexes ===
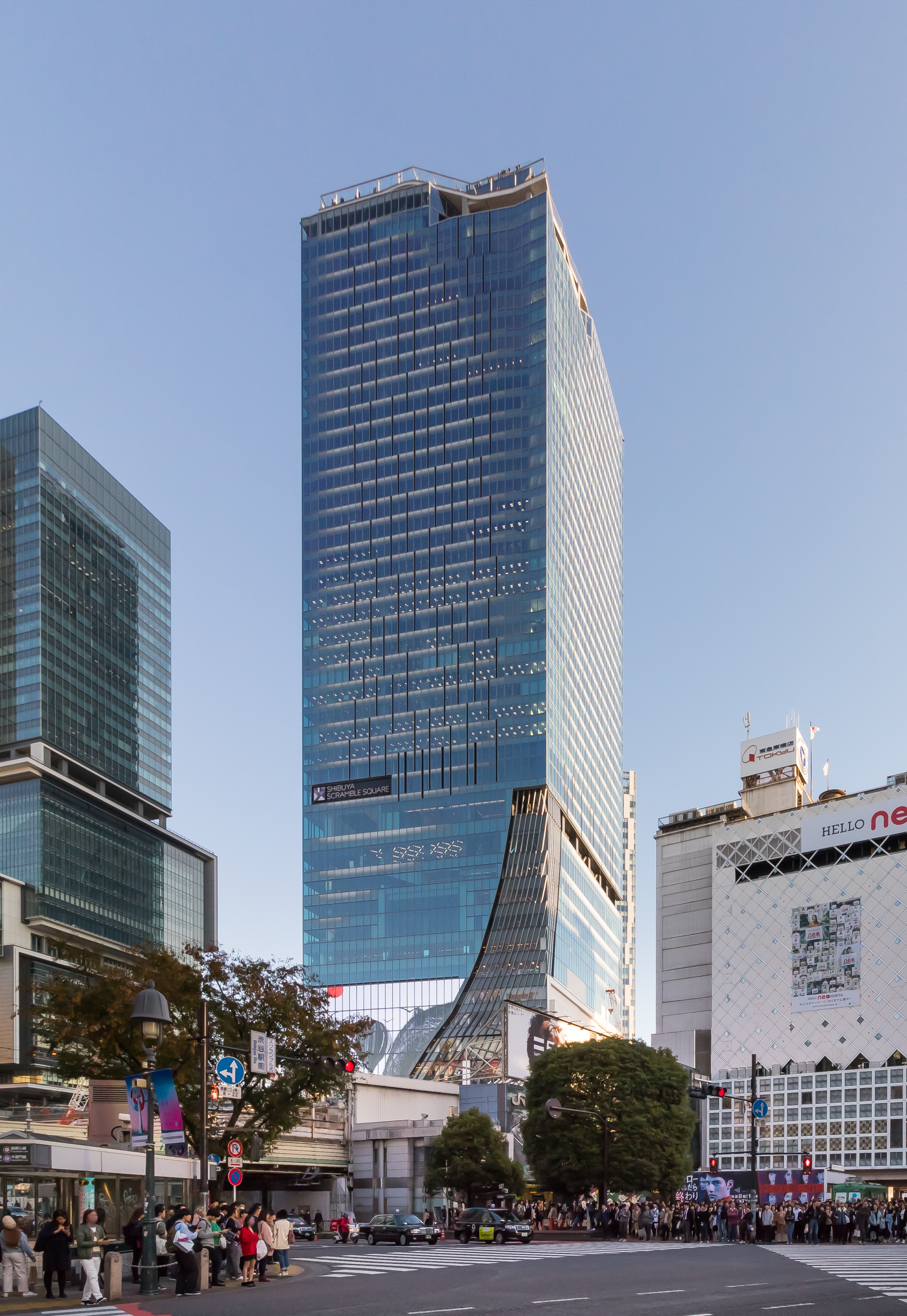
Shibuya Scramble Square and Shibuya Hikarie (left)

- Cerulean Tower, formerly the tallest building in the Shibuya Station area
- Omotesandō Hills, a shopping mall completed in 2006
- Shibuya 109, a popular and trendy place for mostly Japanese young women to shop
- Shibuya Fukuras
- Shibuya Hikarie
- Shibuya Mark City
- Shibuya Scramble Square
- Shibuya Stream
- Shinjuku Southern Terrace
- Takashimaya Times Square, one of the largest department stores in Japan
- Yebisu Garden Place, site of the former Sapporo Brewery, now featuring restaurants and shopping, along with the Westin Hotel

=== Cultural institutions ===
- Bunka Gakuen Costume Museum
- Bunkamura, a cultural center and concert hall complex
- Kawamoto Kihachirō Puppet Gallery
- Koga Masao Museum of Music
- Kokugakuin University Museum, a museum of Japanese archaeology and Shintō culture at Kokugakuin University
- Meiji Jingū Museum
- National Noh Theatre
- New National Theatre, site of opera, ballet, and other performances
- Shibuya Cultural Center Owada, a public cultural complex including lifelong learning center, planetarium and halls
- Shibuya Folk and Literary Shirane Memorial Museum, a public museum of Shibuya's local history and literary
- Shoto Museum of Art
- Toguri Museum of Art
- Ukiyo-e Ōta Memorial Museum of Art
- Watari Museum of Contemporary Art
- Yamatane Museum

=== Religious institutions ===
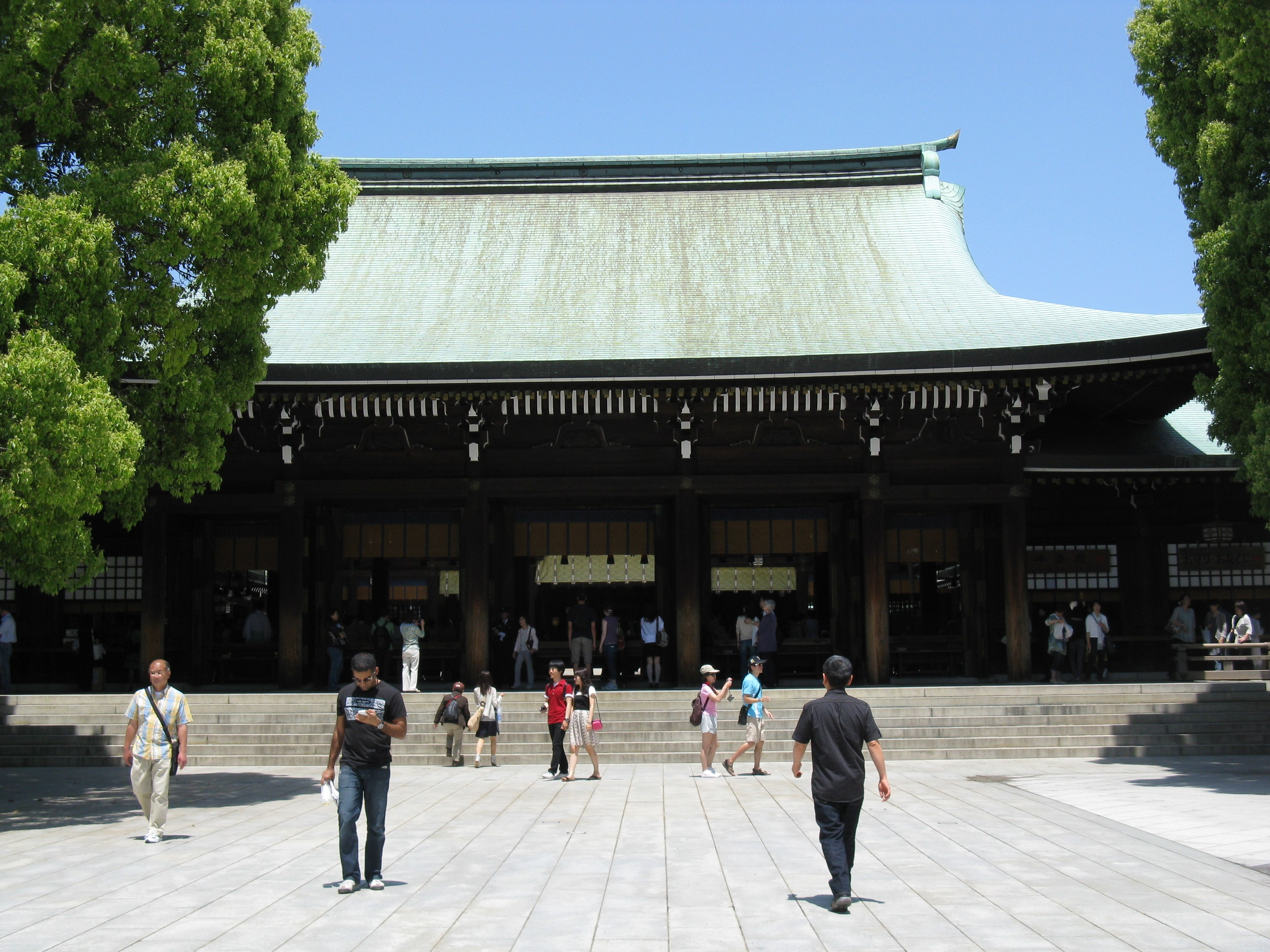
Meiji Shrine

- Konnō Hachimangū, a Shintō shrine on Shibuya Castle ruins, the setting for the film Tenchi: The Samurai Astronomer
- Meiji Shrine, a Shintō shrine dedicated to the souls of Emperor Meiji and Empress Shōken, surrounded by a 70-hectare forest
- Catholic Shibuya Church, Hatsudai Church
- Tōgō Shrine, a Shintō shrine dedicated to Admiral Tōgō Heihachirō, with naval cenotaphs
- Tokyo Baptist Church
- Tokyo Mosque (Tokyo Camii), the largest mosque in Japan
- Tokyo Yamate Church, part of the Protestant United Church of Christ in Japan

=== Streets ===
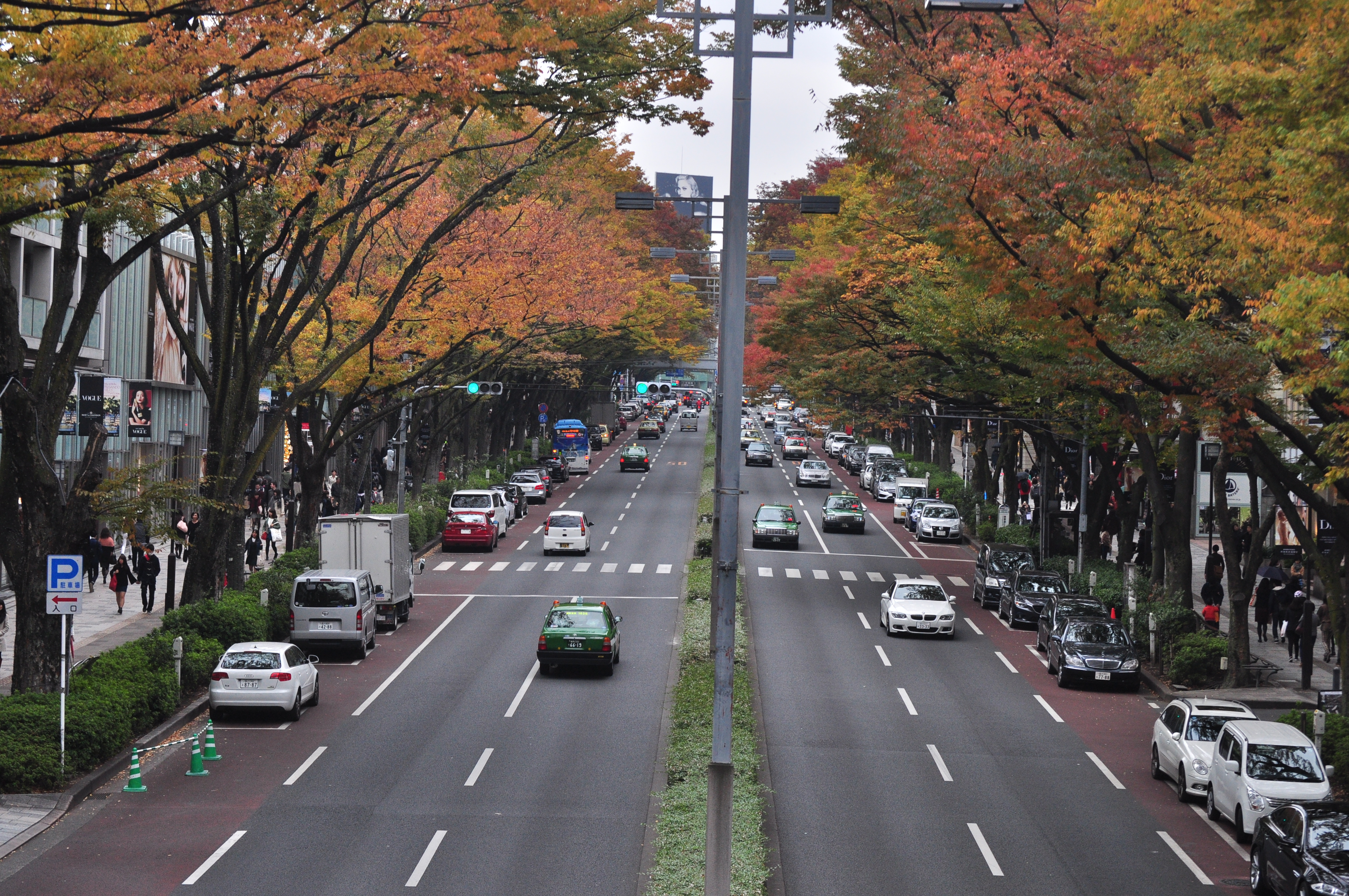
Omotesandō

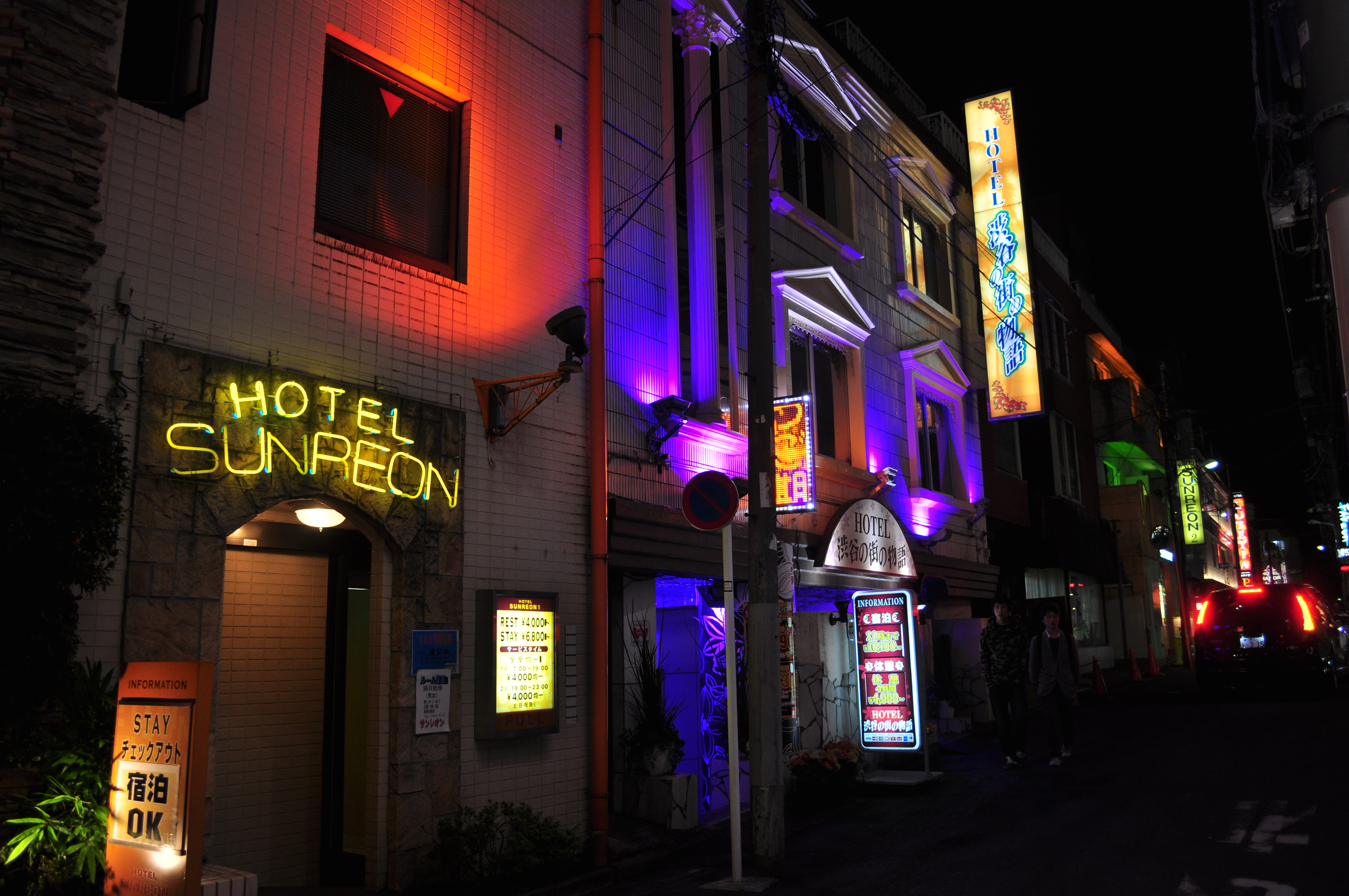
Love hotels concentrated in Dōgenzaka

- Aoyama Dōri, a major east–west thoroughfare
- Cat Street, a promenade in Ura-Harajuku area, famous for its roadside clothing stores
- Center Gai
- Dōgen-zaka, a road in central Shibuya famous for its surrounding nightclubs and love hotels
- Komazawa Dōri – running past Daikanyama, down the hill to Ebisu, crossing Meiji Dōri and up the hill through Higashi and Hiroo. The road stops at the Shuto Expressway in Minami Aoyama. Famed for its beautiful trees that turn bright yellow in autumn, cafes, restaurants, and a large replica of Michelangelo's David outside of the Papas building. Prince Hitachi and Princess Hitachi have their official residence in a palace in large gardens off Komazawadori in Higashi.
- Shibuya Kōen Dōri, in central Shibuya between Shibuya Station and Yoyogi Park
- Meiji Dōri (Tokyo), a major north–south thoroughfare parallel to the Yamanote Line
- Miyamasu-zaka
- Shibuya Nonbei-Yokochō, an alley by the railroad tracks famous for its small bars and old Tokyo feel
- Omotesandō, an avenue leading up to the Meiji Shrine with a number of famous-brand boutiques
- Spain-zaka
- Takeshita Street, a shopping street through Harajuku
- Yamate Dōri (Tokyo)

=== Others ===
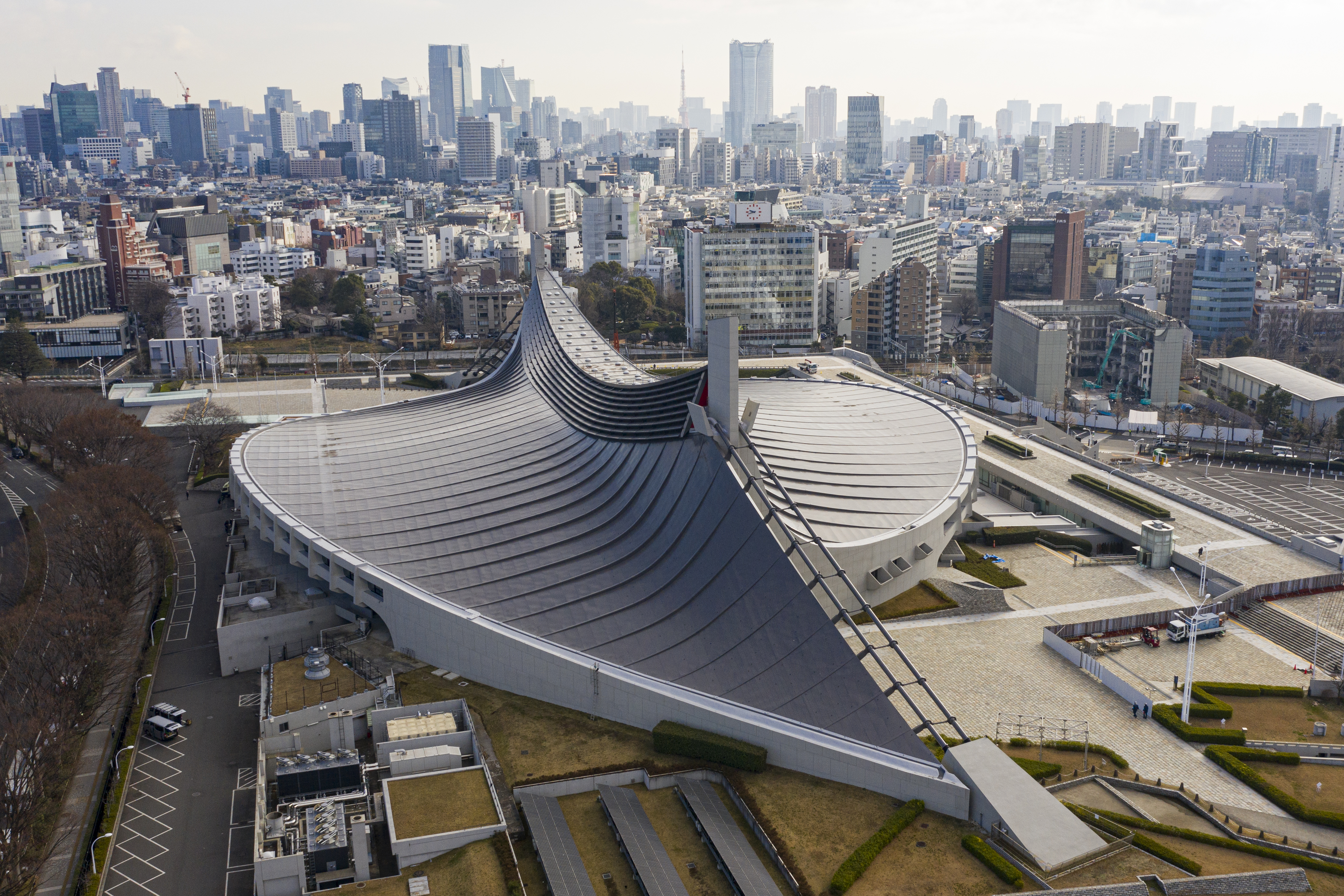
Yoyogi National Gymnasium

- NHK Broadcasting Center, headquarters of the NHK radio, television, and satellite broadcasting system
- NTT Docomo Yoyogi Building, the fourth-tallest building in Tokyo, patterned after the Empire State Building
- Shibuya Sky, a 360-degree open-air observatory on Shibuya Scramble Square, the highest point in the district of Shibuya overlooking Shibuya and the greater Tokyo skyline
- Tokyo Metropolitan Gymnasium, a major indoor arena complex
- United Nations University
- Yoyogi National Gymnasium, designed for the 1964 Tokyo Olympics by Kenzo Tange

== Transportation ==
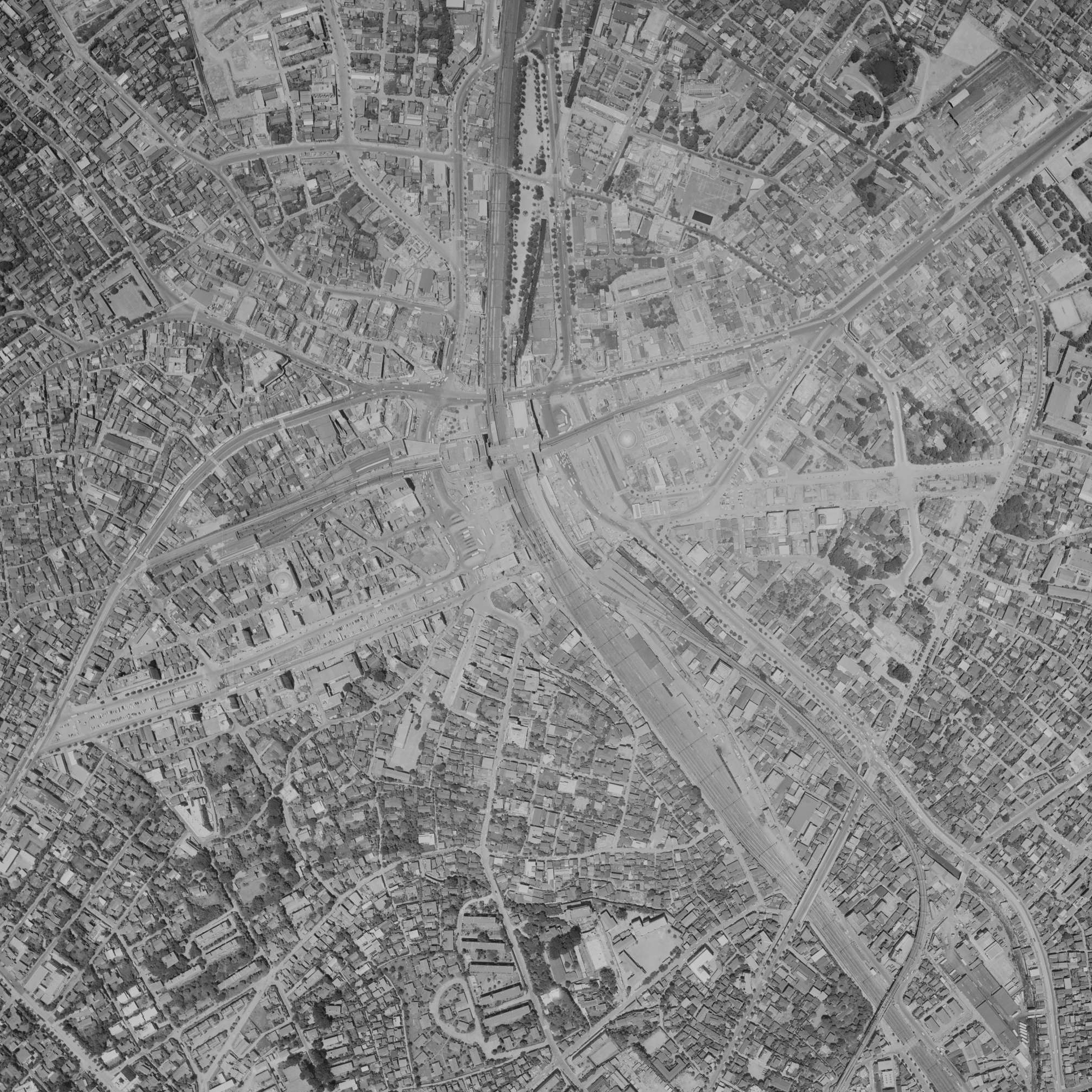
Aerial view around Shibuya Station in June 1963

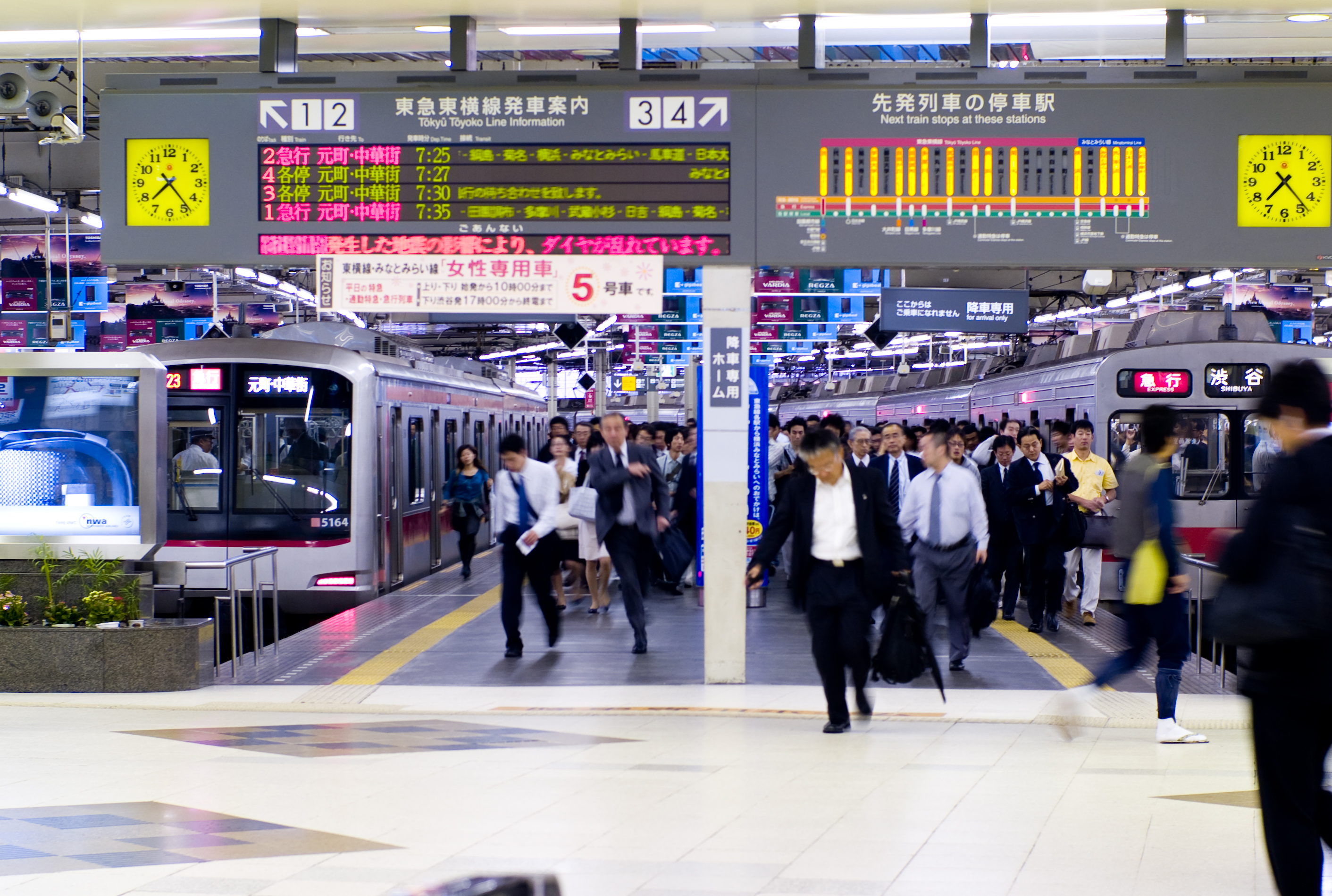
The former Tokyu Toyoko Line station (now demolished)

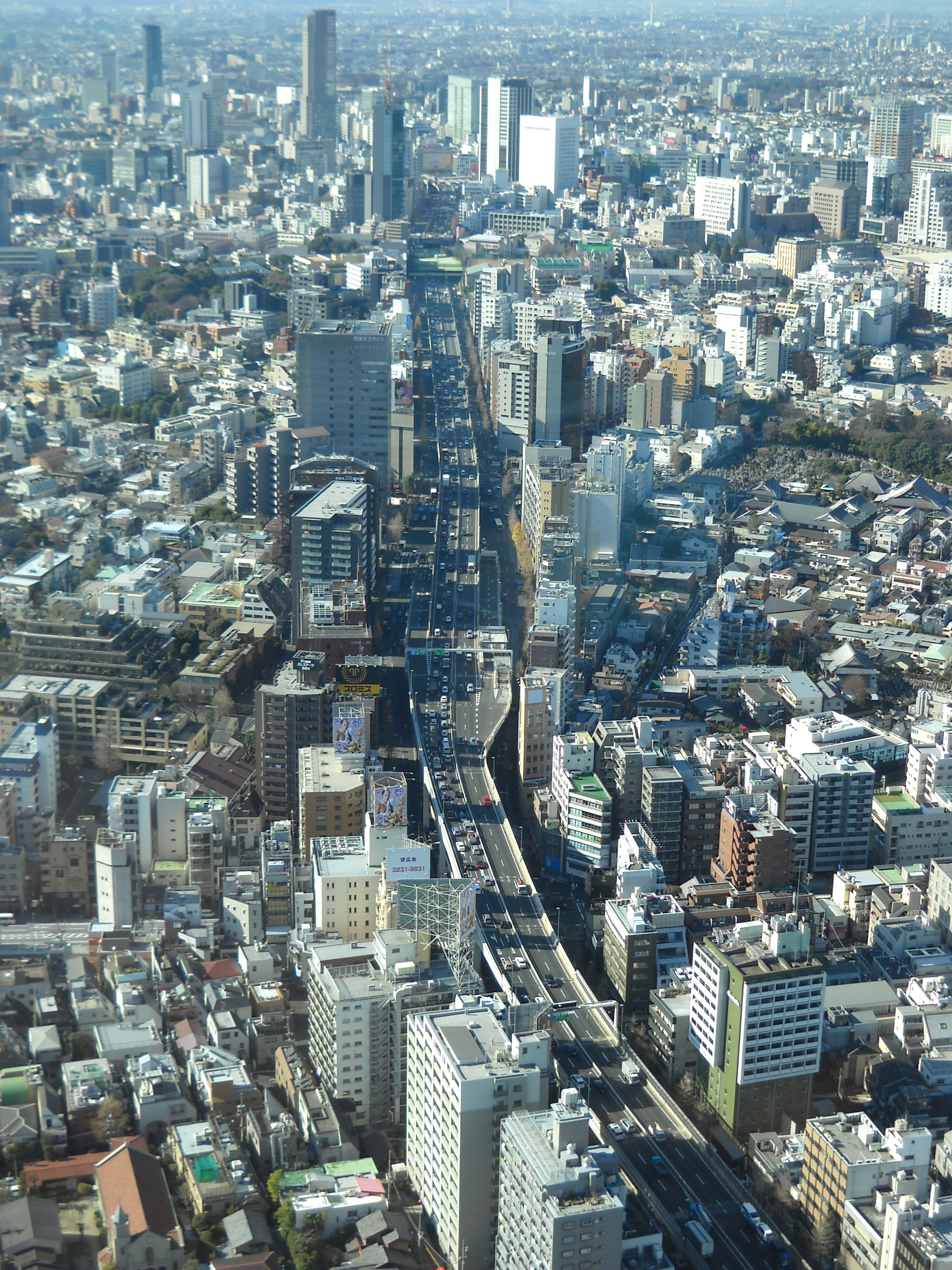
Shuto Expressway No.3 Shibuya Route

=== Rail ===
The main stations in Shibuya are Shinjuku (southern half), Yoyogi, Harajuku/Meiji Jingūmae, Shibuya and Ebisu.

- JR East
  - Yamanote Line: Shinjuku, Yoyogi, Harajuku, Shibuya, Ebisu stations
  - Chūō Line (Rapid), Chūō-Sōbu Line: Shinjuku, Yoyogi, Sendagaya stations
  - Saikyō Line, Shōnan-Shinjuku Line: Shinjuku, Shibuya, Ebisu stations
- Tokyo Metro
  - Ginza Line: Shibuya station
  - Marunouchi Line: Shinjuku station
  - Hibiya Line: Ebisu station
  - Chiyoda Line: Meiji Jingūmae, Yoyogi Kōen, Yoyogi Uehara stations
  - Hanzōmon Line: Shibuya station
  - Fukutoshin Line: Shibuya, Meiji Jingūmae, Kitasandō stations
- Tokyo Metropolitan Bureau of Transportation
  - Toei Shinjuku Line: Shinjuku station
  - Toei Ōedo Line: Shinjuku, Yoyogi, Kokuritsu Kyogi-jo stations
- Tokyu Corporation
  - Tōyoko Line: Shibuya, Daikanyama stations
  - Den-en-toshi Line: Shibuya, Ikejiri Ohashi stations
- Keio Corporation
  - Inokashira Line: Shibuya, Shinsen stations
  - Keiō Line: Shinjuku, Sasazuka stations
  - Keiō New Line: Shinjuku, Hatsudai, Hatagaya, Sasazuka stations
- Odakyu Electric Railway Odawara Line: Shinjuku, Minami Shinjuku, Sangubashi, Yoyogi Hachiman, Yoyogi Uehara stations
- The Imperial Platform, used by the Japanese Imperial Family on rare occasions, is located along the Yamanote Line, a few minutes walk from Harajuku Station in Sendagaya 3-chome.

=== Highway ===
- Shuto Expressway
  - No.3 Shibuya Route (Tanimachi JCT – Yoga)
  - No.4 Shinjuku Route (Miyakezaka JCT – Takaido)
- National highways
  - Route 20, the Kōshū Kaidō
  - Route 246, with the local names Aoyama-dōri and Tamagawa-dōri

== Economy ==
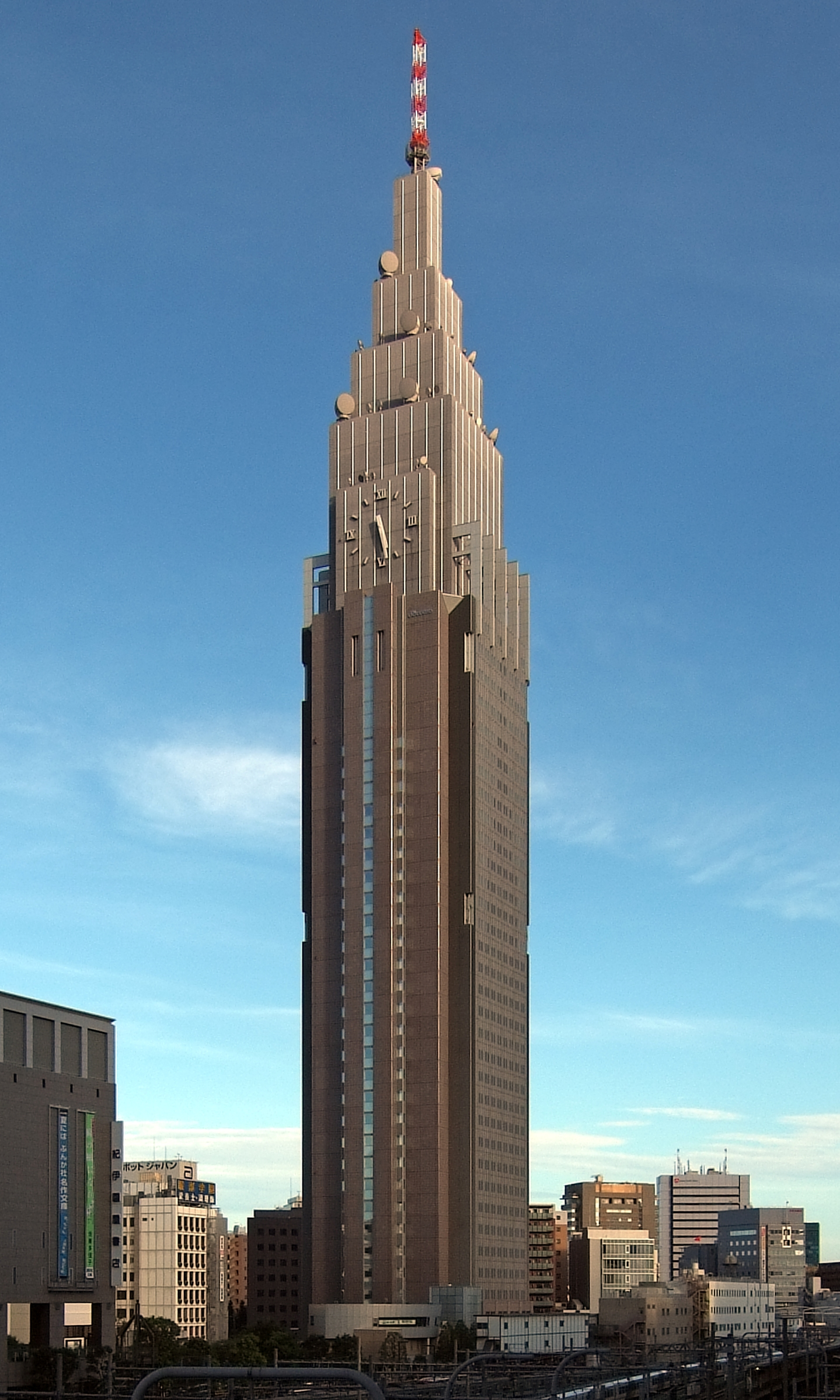
NTT Docomo Yoyogi Building

Several companies are headquartered in Shibuya.

Calpis, Casio, Mixi, Niwango, Nihon Dempa Kogyo, and Tokyu Corporation have their headquarters in Shibuya. East Japan Railway Company have their headquarters in Yoyogi, Shibuya. 81 Produce has its headquarters in Tomigaya, Shibuya.

=== Former operations ===
At one time Smilesoft had its headquarters in the CT Sasazuka Building in Shibuya. In May 1985 the headquarters of Bandai Visual moved to Shibuya. In March 1990 the headquarters moved to Shinjuku.

A.D. Vision - Tokyo, Y.K., the Japanese subsidiary of A.D. Vision, was in Shibuya. Acclaim Entertainment once had its Tokyo office in the Nomora Building. The Japanese subsidiary of Titus Interactive, Titus Japan K.K., had its head office on the eighth floor of the Kotubuki Dogenzaka Building in Dōgenzaka. The former animation studio; Group TAC was also located here.

Square Enix headquarters were located in Yoyogi before moving to Shinjuku in 2012.

=== Companies ===
- Amway Japan: Japan headquarters, a multi-level marketing company
- Coca-Cola
- Campbells Soup's Japan division is headquartered in Shibuya, on the 10th floor of the Tokyo Tatemono Hiroo Building.
- CyberAgent: Internet advertising agency
- East Japan Railway Company (JR East)
- Gap Inc
- Ito En: bottler of tea, coffee, vegetable drinks, and other beverages
- NHK (Nippon Hoso Kyokai) (NHK Broadcasting Center)
- Papas: clothing, cafe, and bakery company
- Sapporo Breweries Limited
- Trend Micro Japan: security software company

== Education ==
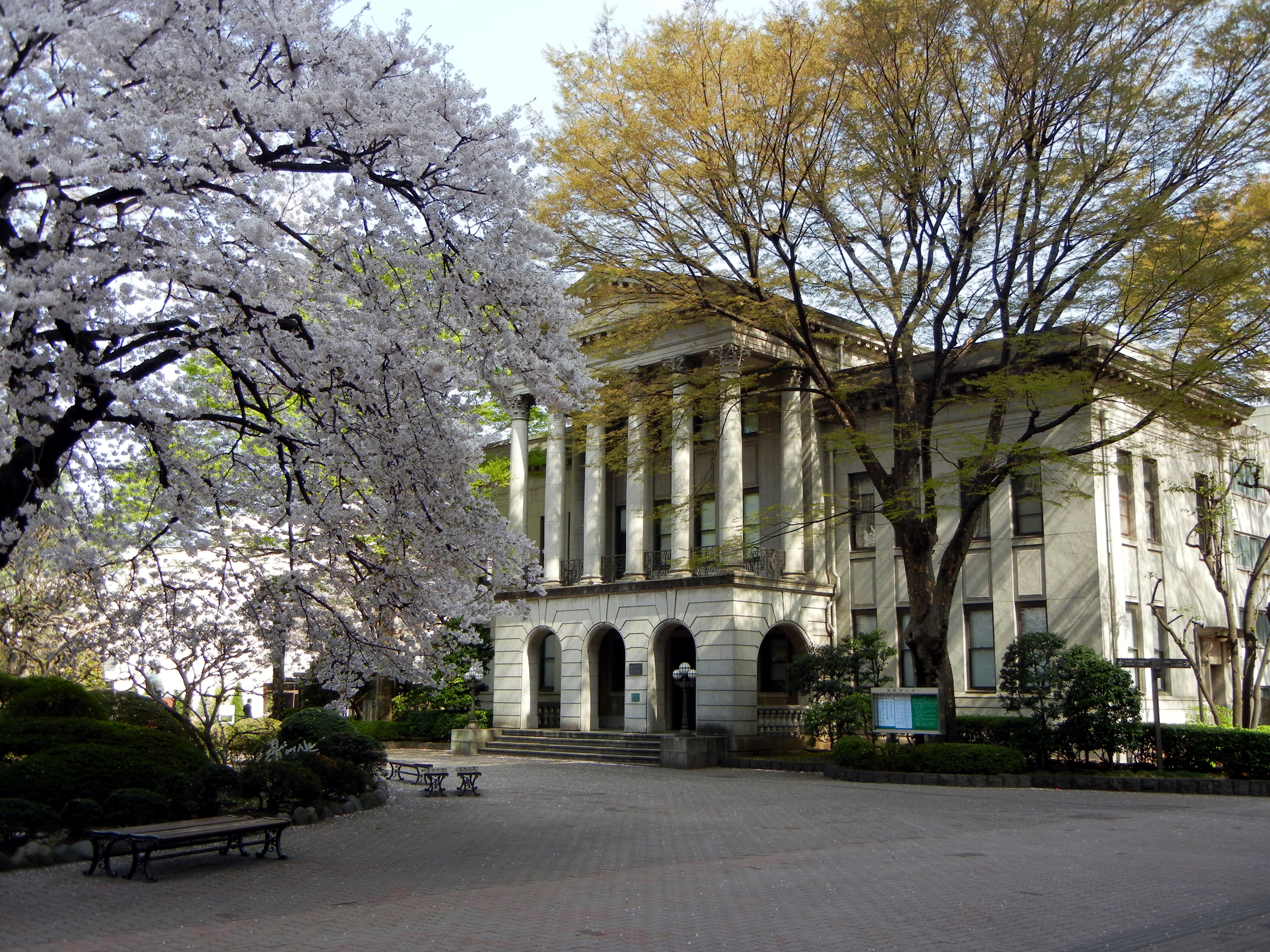
Aoyama Gakuin Majima Memorial Hall

=== Colleges and universities ===
- Aoyama Gakuin University
- Bunka Gakuen University (Yoyogi)
- Jissen Women's University
- Kokugakuin University (Higashi)
- Shibuya University Network
- Tokai University
- United Nations University
- University of the Sacred Heart (Hiroo)

=== Primary and secondary schools ===
The Shibuya City Board of Education operates public elementary and junior high schools, while Tokyo Metropolitan Government Board of Education operates public senior high schools.

Public combined elementary and junior high schools

- Shibuya Honmachi Gakuen (渋谷本町学園)

Junior high schools:

- Hachiyama Junior High School (鉢山中学校)
- Harajuku Gaien Junior High School (原宿外苑中学校)
- Hiroo Junior High School (広尾中学校)
- Sasazuka Junior High School (笹塚中学校)
- Shoto Junior High School (松濤中学校)
- Uehara Junior High School (上原中学校)
- Yoyogi Junior High School (代々木中学校)

Elementary schools:

- Hatashiro Elementary School (幡代小学校)
- Hatomori Elementary School (鳩森小学校)
- Hiroo Elementary School (広尾小学校)
- Jingumae Elementary School (神宮前小学校)
- Jinnan Elementary School (神南小学校)
- Kakezuka Elementary School (加計塚小学校)
- Nagayato Elementary School (長谷戸小学校)
- Nakahata Elementary School (中幡小学校)
- Nishihara Elementary School (西原小学校)
- Rinsen Elementary School (臨川小学校)
- Sarugaku Elementary School (猿楽小学校)
- Sasazuka Elementary School (笹塚小学校)
- Sendagaya Elementary School (千駄谷小学校)
- Tokiwamatsu Elementary School (常磐松小学校)
- Tomigaya Elementary School (富谷小学校)
- Uehara Elementary School (上原小学校)
- Yoyogisanya Elementary School (代々木山谷小学校)

Private schools include:

- Aoyama Gakuin Elementary, Junior and Senior High School—private co-ed school, in Shibuya, affiliated with Aoyama Gakuin University
- Aoyama High School—public co-ed school, in Jingūmae
- First Commercial High School—public co-ed school, in Daikanyama
- Fujimigaoka Junior and Senior High School—private girls' school, in Sasazuka
- Hiroo Gakuen Junior and Senior High School—private co-ed school, in Hiroo
- Hiroo High School—public co-ed school, in Higashi
- International School of Sacred Heart, in Hiroo
- Jingūmae International Exchange School (JIES), within the Shibuya Ward Jingūmae Elementary School in Omotesando
- Jissen Joshi-Gakuen Elementary, Junior and Senior High School—private girls' school, in Higashi, affiliated with Jissen Women's University
- Kantō International Senior High School—private co-ed school, in Honchō
- Kokugakuin Senior High School—private co-ed school, in Jingūmae

The British School in Tokyo Shibuya Campus was previously in operation.

=== Public libraries ===
Shibuya operates several public libraries, including the Central Library, the Nishihara Library, the Shibuya Library, the Tomigaya Library, the Sasazuka Library, the Honmachi Library, and the Rinsen Library. In addition, the Yoyogi Youth Hall houses the Yoyogi Library Room.

== In popular culture ==
Shibuya has appeared in the manga: Alice in Borderland, My Hero Academia, the 'Shibuya Incident' arc of Jujutsu Kaisen as the site of the titular incident which sees the destruction of the ward, Super GALS! Kotobuki Ran, Tokyo Revengers, and Ya Boy Kongming!.

It has featured in the television series: Jellyfish Can't Swim in the Night.

It featured in the film: The Fast and the Furious: Tokyo Drift, Sonic the Hedgehog 3 (film) and Colorful Stage! The Movie: A Miku Who Can't Sing

It has also appeared in the video games: 428: Shibuya Scramble, Chaos;Head, Ghostwire: Tokyo, Hatsune Miku: Colorful Stage!, Persona 5, The World Ends With You, Neo: The World Ends with You, Sonic X Shadow Generations, Tokyo Mirage Sessions ♯FE, Reynatis and Forza Horizon 6. In Kingdom Hearts IV, the city of Quadratum is based on Shibuya, and in Project Gotham Racing, Race Driver: Grid, Colin McRae: Dirt 2, Dirt 3, and Dirt Showdown as race tracks.

It was mentioned in the 2021 Kanye West song "Life of The Party" with Andre 3000.

It is mentioned in the 2025 Hayley Williams song "Dream Girl in Shibuya".

== International relations ==
=== Friendship city ===
- Üsküdar District, Istanbul Province, Turkey (since 2005)

=== Sister cities ===
- Miraflores District, Lima, Peru (since 2024)
- Honolulu, State of Hawaii, the United States of America (since 2024)

=== International organization offices in Shibuya ===
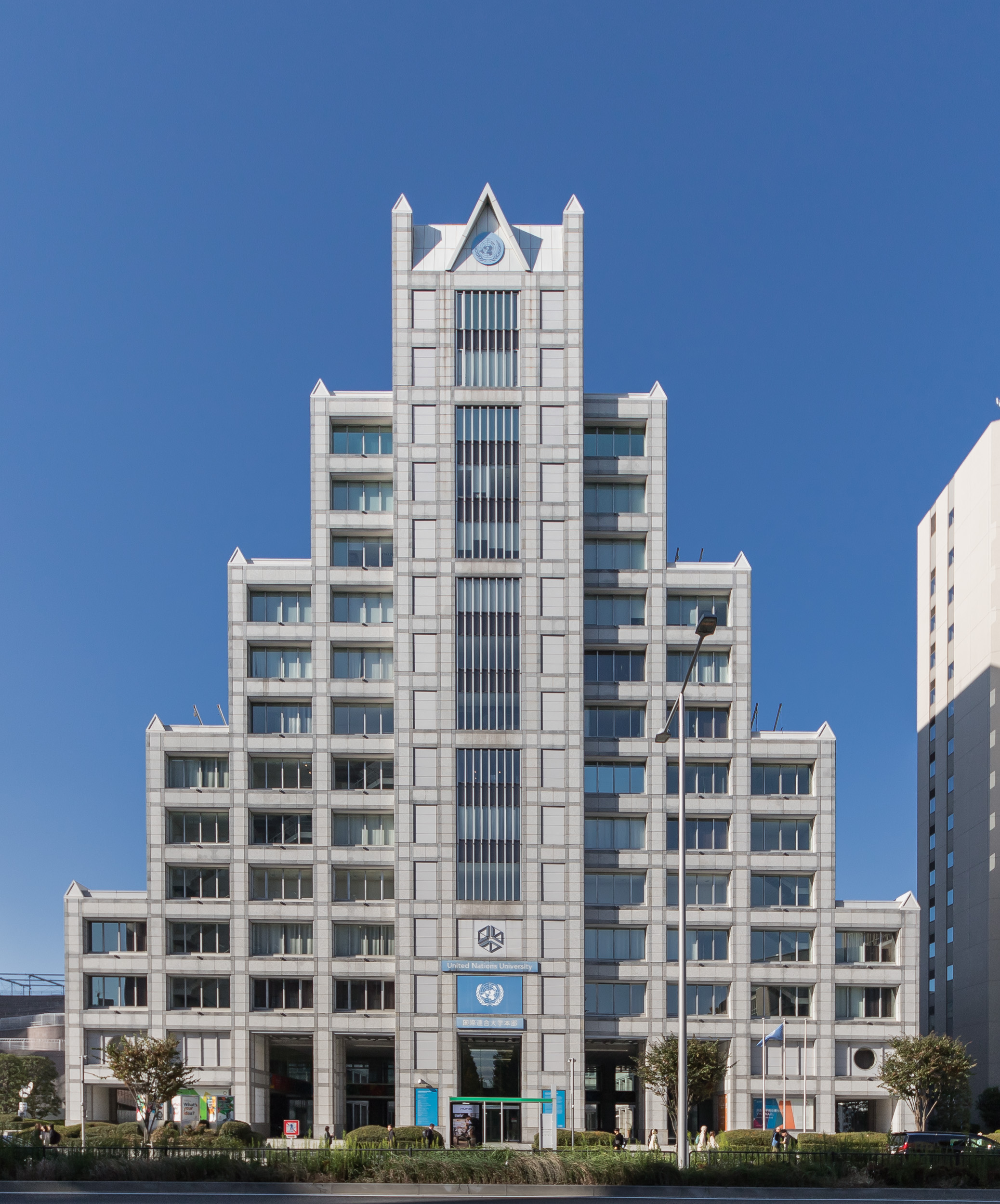
United Nations University Headquarters Building

There are following offices at the United Nations University Headquarters Building in Jingūmae, Shibuya.

- ILO (International Labour Organization) Office for Japan
- UNDP (United Nations Development Programme) Representation Office in Tokyo
- UNFPA (United Nations Population Fund) Representation Office in Japan
- UNIC Tokyo (United Nations Information CentreTokyo)
- UNICEF Tokyo Office
- UNIDO ITPO (United Nations Industrial Development Organization Investment and Technology Promotion Office), Tokyo
- UNOPS（United Nations Office for Project Services）Tokyo Liaison Office
- UNU-IAS (Institute of the Advanced Study of Sustainability)

=== Diplomatic missions in Shibuya ===
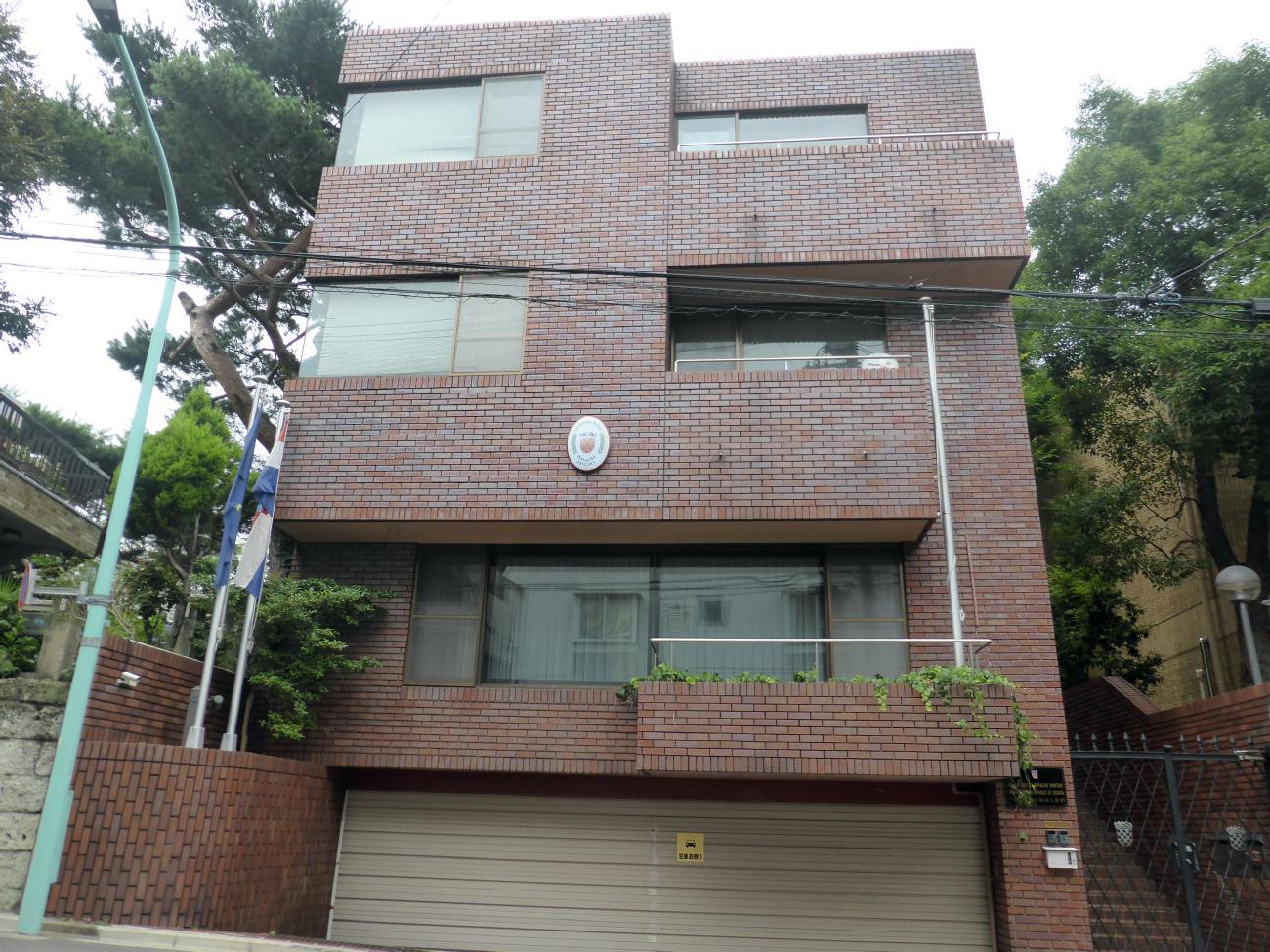
Embassy of Croatia in Hiroo, Shibuya

Following countries operate their embassies in Shibuya.

- United Arab Emirates
- Bulgaria
- Burkina Faso
- Republic of Congo
- Cote d'Ivoire
- Croatia
- Czech Republic
- Denmark
- Estonia
- Guinea
- Iraq
- Jordan
- Latvia
- Libya
- Malaysia
- Mongolia
- New Zealand
- Oman
- Peru
- Turkey
- Turkmenistan
- Uganda
- Vietnam

== Gallery ==
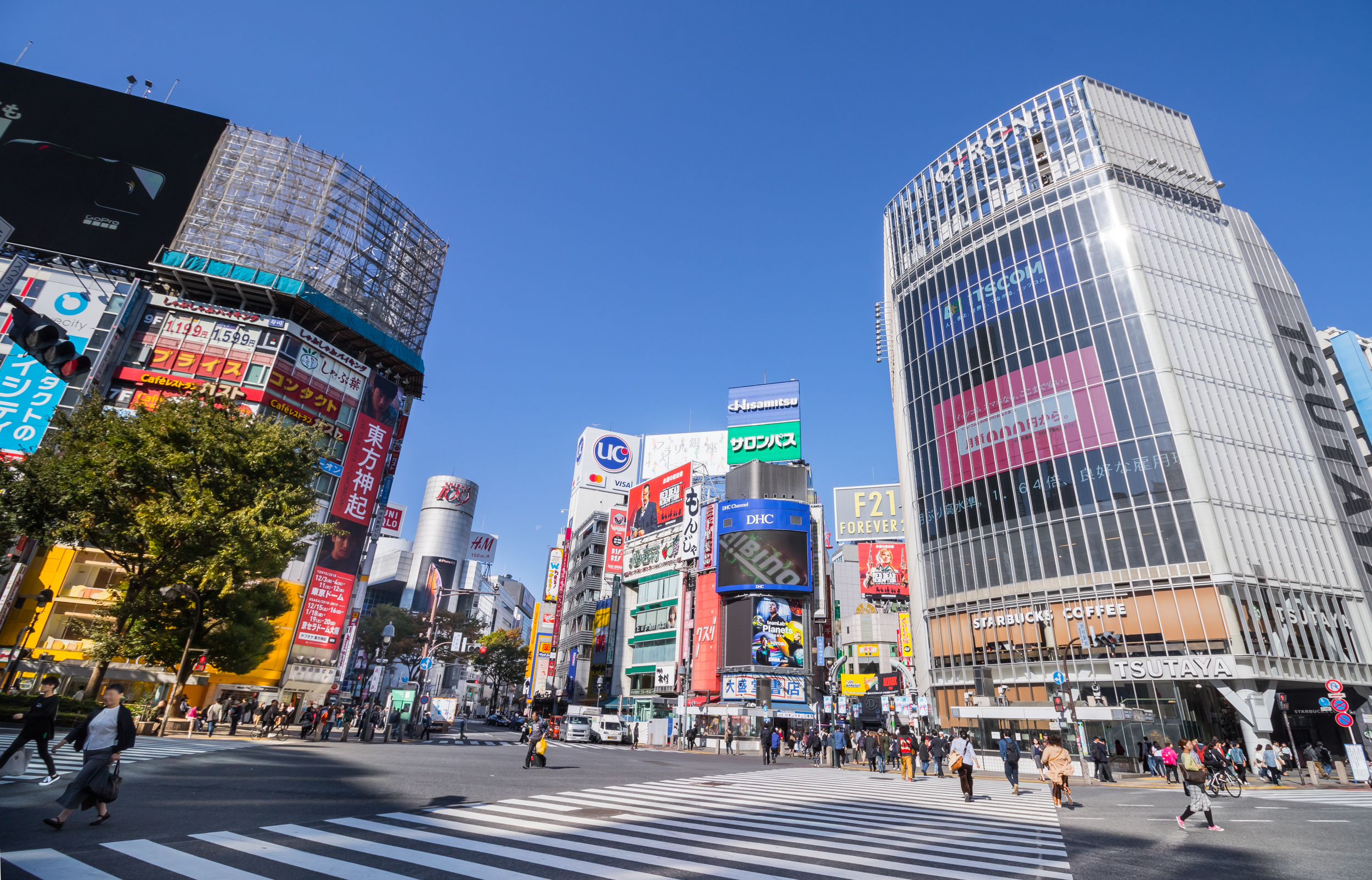
Shibuya crossing at ground level

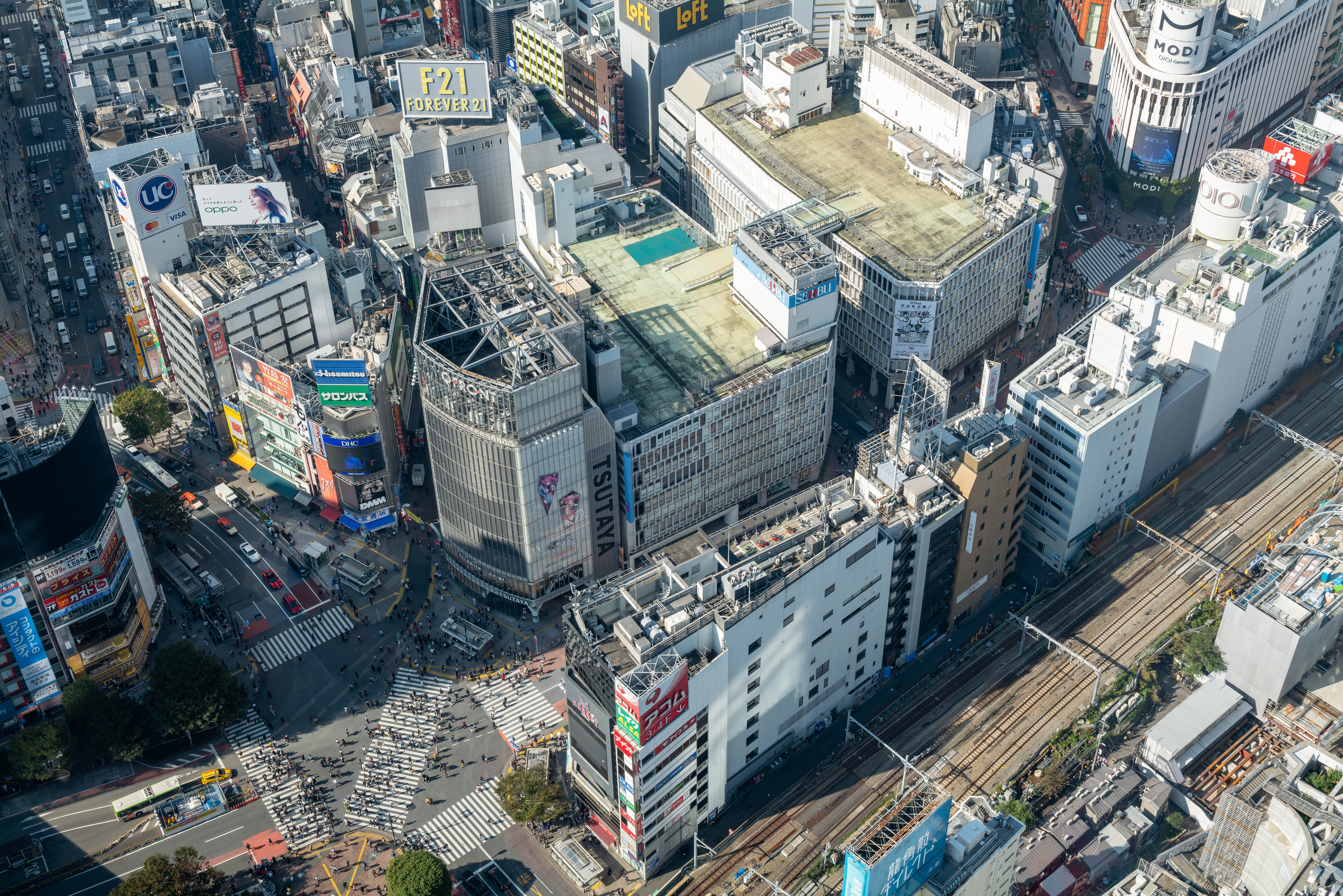
View from the Sky View observation deck

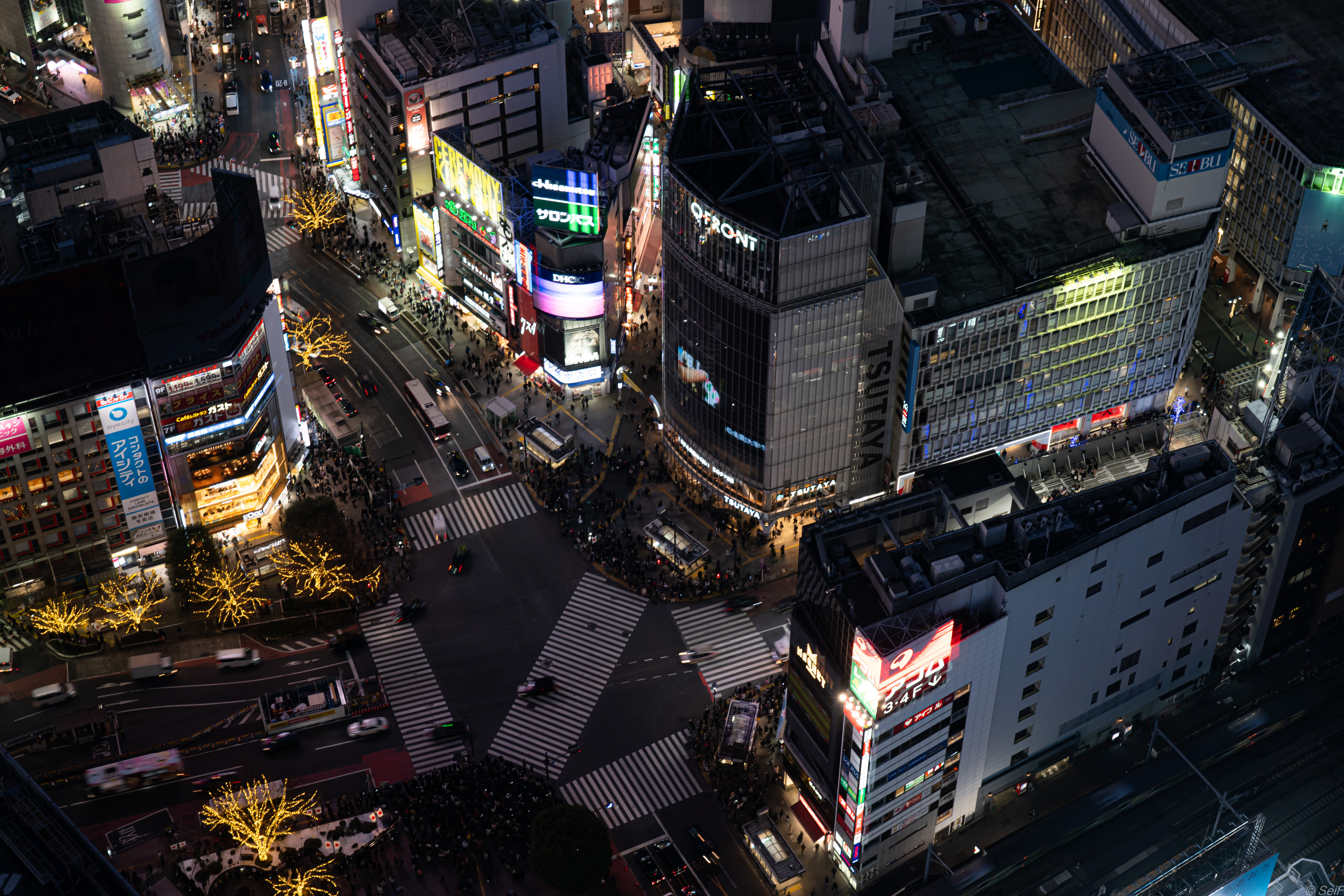
Shibuya crossing at night

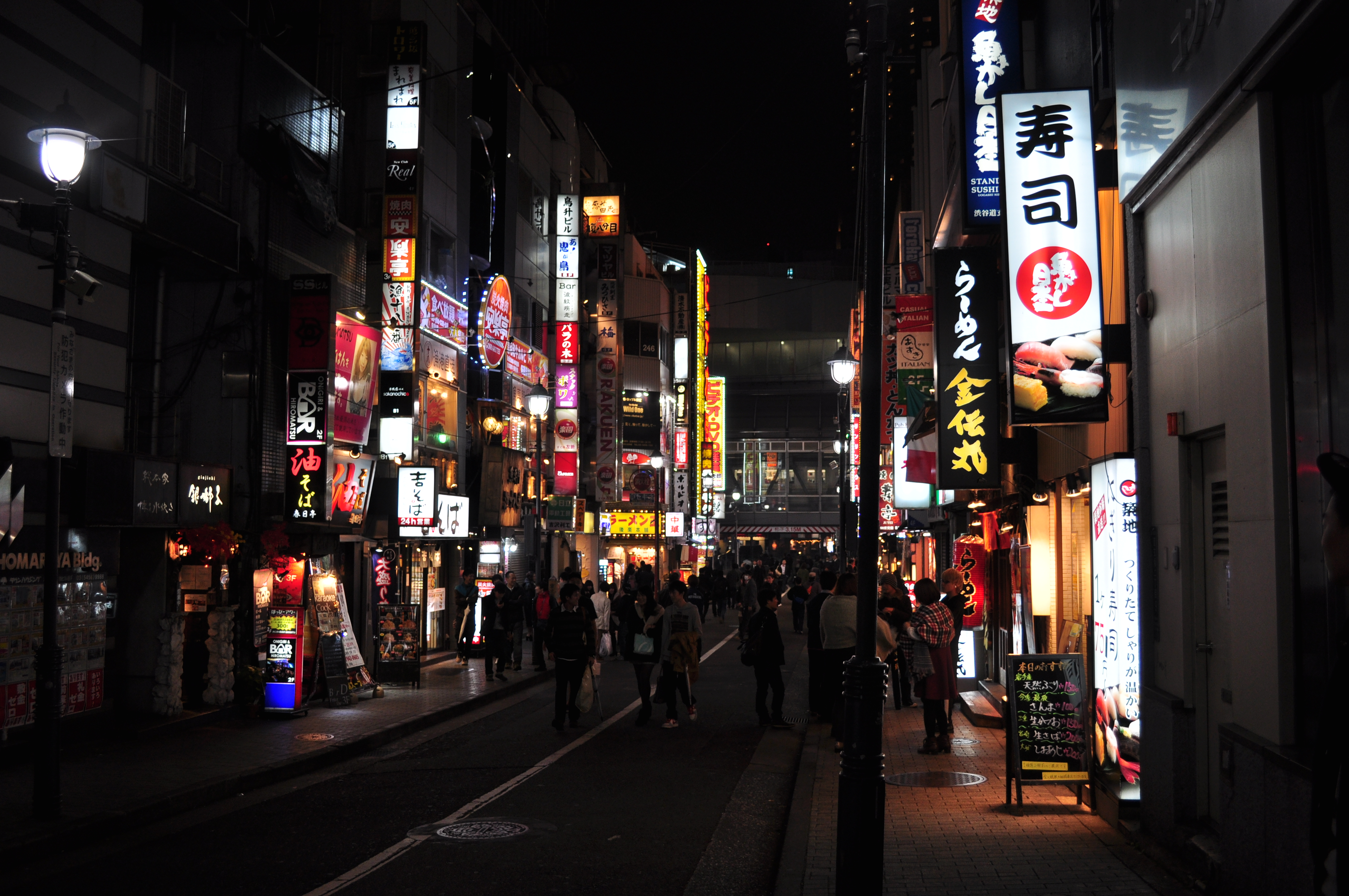
Streets of Shibuya at night

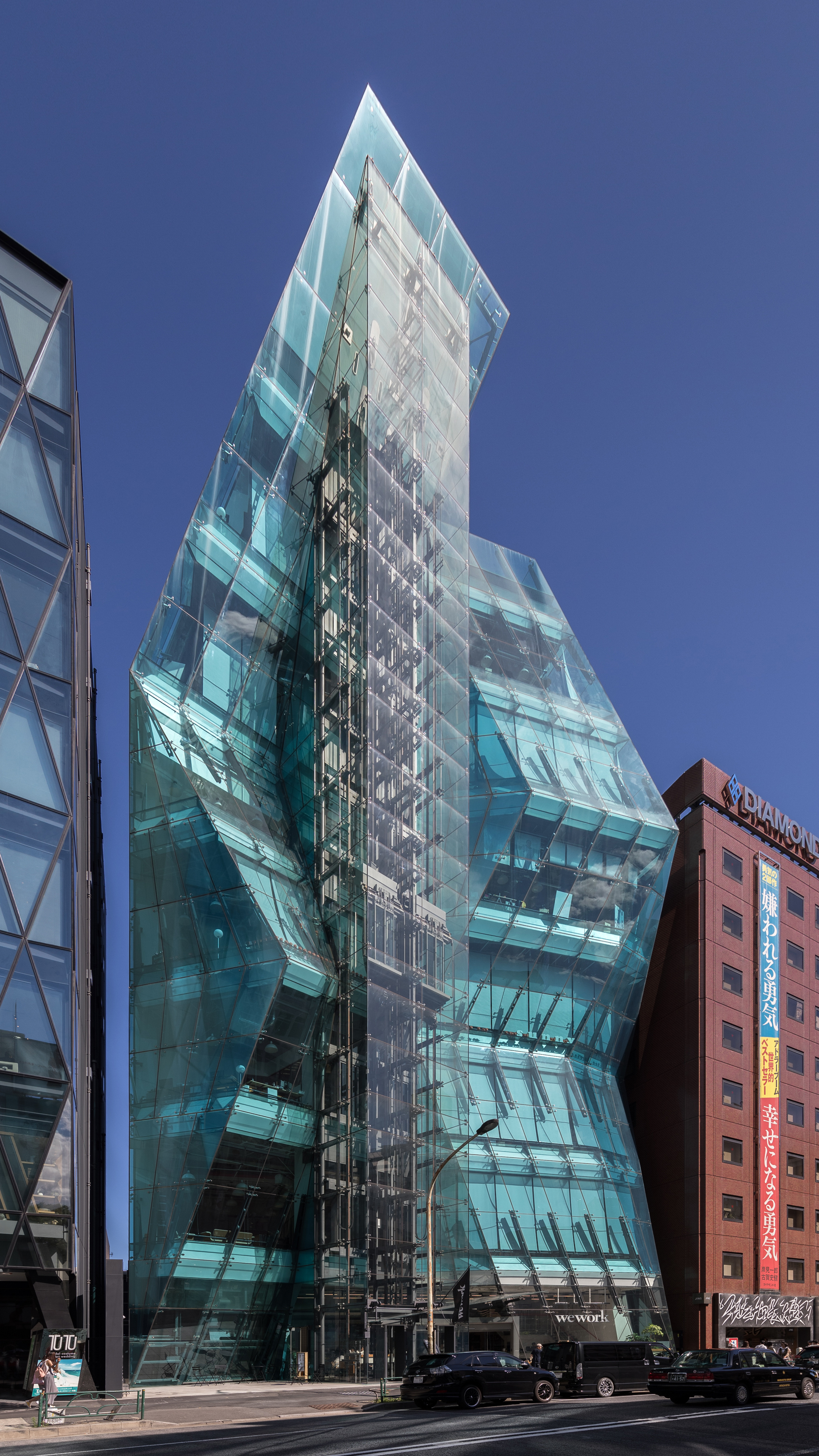
"The Iceberg", building in Shibuya

== See also ==
- List of leading shopping streets and districts by city
- Shibuya-kei

Similar venues with electronic billboards, jumbotrons and media towers.

- Sankofa Square (Toronto)
- Times Square (New York City)
