= Tomigaya =

District in Shibuya, Tokyo, Japan

Tomigaya 富ヶ谷
- Neighborhood in Shibuya
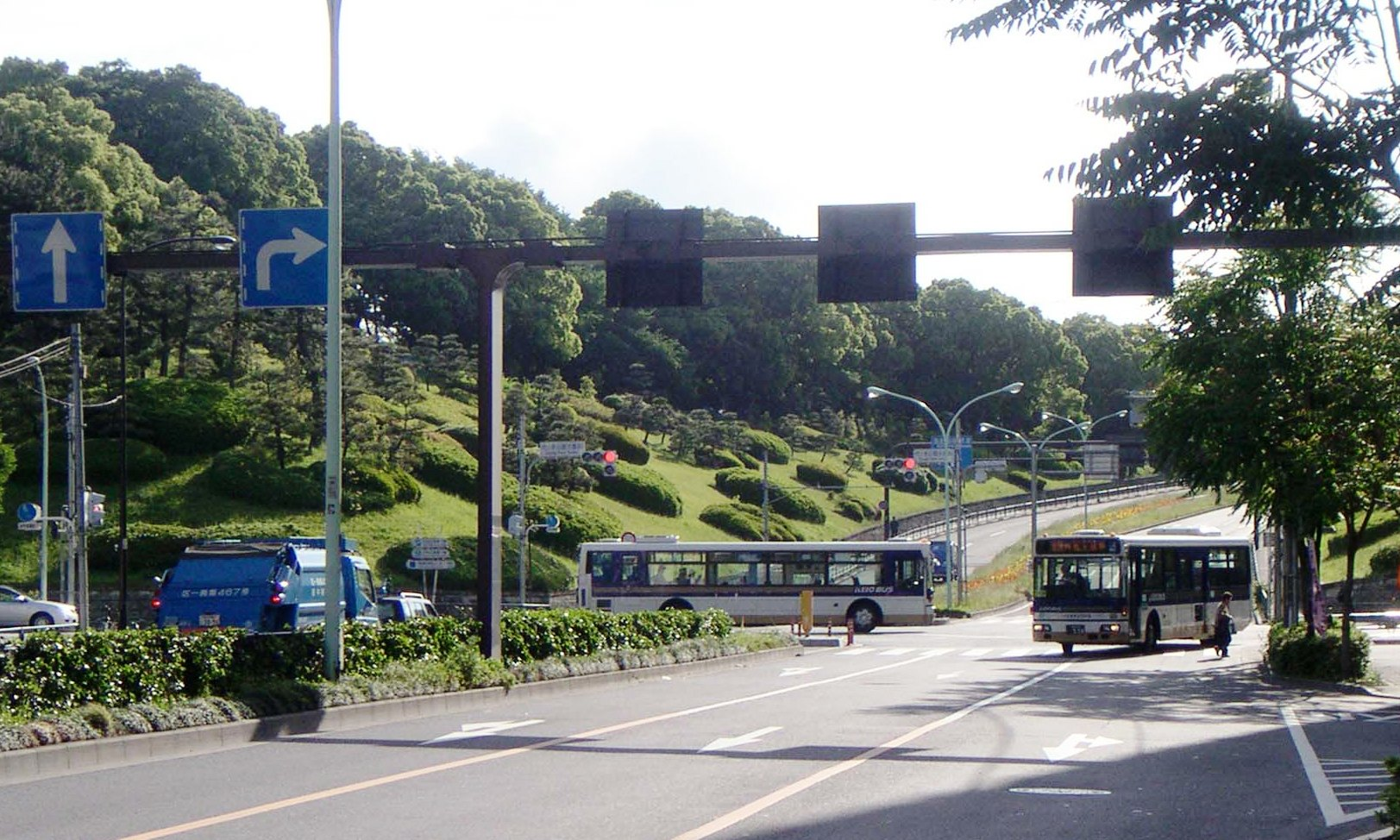
- Interactive map of Tomigaya
- Coordinates: 35°39′58″N 139°41′16″E
- Country: Japan
- Prefecture: Tokyo
- Special ward: Shibuya

Population (1 October 2020)
  - Total: 9,499
- Time zone: UTC+09:00
- ZIP code: 151–0063
- Telephone area code: 03

Tomigaya (富ヶ谷) is a district of Shibuya, Tokyo, Japan.

As of October 2020, the population of this district is 9,499. The postal code for Tomigaya is 151–0063.

== Education ==
Shibuya Board of Education operates public elementary and junior high schools.

Tomigaya 1-chome, and Tomigaya 2-chome 1–9, 12–21, and 44-45-ban are zoned to Tomigaya Elementary School (富谷小学校). Tomigaya 2-chome 10-11 and 22-43-ban are zoned to Uehara Elementary School (上原小学校). All of Tomigaya (1 and 2-chome) is zoned to Uehara Junior High School (上原中学校).

The Yoyogi campus of Tokai University is located here.
