= Nanpeidaichō, Shibuya =

District in Shibuya, Tokyo, Japan

Nanpeidaichō 南平台町
- Neighborhood in Shibuya
- Interactive map of Nanpeidaichō
- Country: Japan
- Prefecture: Tokyo
- Special ward: Shibuya

Population (1 October 2020)
  - Total: 2,035
- Time zone: UTC+09:00
- ZIP code: 150-0036
- Telephone area code: 03

Nanpeidaichō (南平台町) is a district of Shibuya, Tokyo, Japan.

The 57th Prime Minister of Japan Nobusuke Kishi (1896–1987) and the 66th Prime Minister of Japan Takeo Miki (1907–1988) owned their residences there.

== Geography ==
Nanpeidaichō borders Dōgenzaka and Shinsenchō in the north, Sakuragaokachō to the east, Hachiyamachō and Uguisudanichō to the south, and Aobadai to the west.

== Places of interest ==
=== Embassies ===
- Embassy of Malaysia (Nanpeidaichō 20)
- Embassy of the United Arab Emirates (Nanpeidaichō 9-10)
- Embassy of the Philippines (Nanpeidaichō 11-24; annex building)

=== Other ===
- Headquarters of Tokyu Corporation (Nanpeidaichō 5-6)
- Headquarters of Yomeishu (Nanpeidaichō 16-25)

== Education ==
Shibuya Board of Education operates public elementary and junior high schools.

All of Nanpeidaicho is zoned to Jinnan Elementary School (神南小学校), and Shoto Junior High School (松濤中学校).
