= Shinsenchō =

District in Shibuya, Tokyo, Japan

Shinsenchō 神泉町
- Neighborhood in Shibuya
- Interactive map of Shinsenchō
- Country: Japan
- Prefecture: Tokyo
- Special ward: Shibuya

Population (1 October 2020)
  - Total: 2,104
- Time zone: UTC+09:00
- ZIP code: 150-0045
- Telephone area code: 03

Shinsenchō (神泉町) is a district of Shibuya, Tokyo, Japan.

As of October 2020, the population of this district is 2,104. The postal code for Shinsenchō is 150–0045.

The headquarters of Parco are located here.

== Transportation ==
=== Rail ===
Nearest stations are Shinsen, on the Keio Inokashira Line, Shibuya and Ikejiri-Ōhashi.

== Education ==
Shibuya Board of Education operates public elementary and junior high schools.

All of Shinsenchō is zoned to Jinnan Elementary School (神南小学校), and Shoto Junior High School (松濤中学校).

Kokusaibunka Technical College of Hair Design is in Shinsenchō.
