= Dōgenzaka =

District in Shibuya, Tokyo, Japan

Dōgenzaka 道玄坂
- Neighborhood in Shibuya
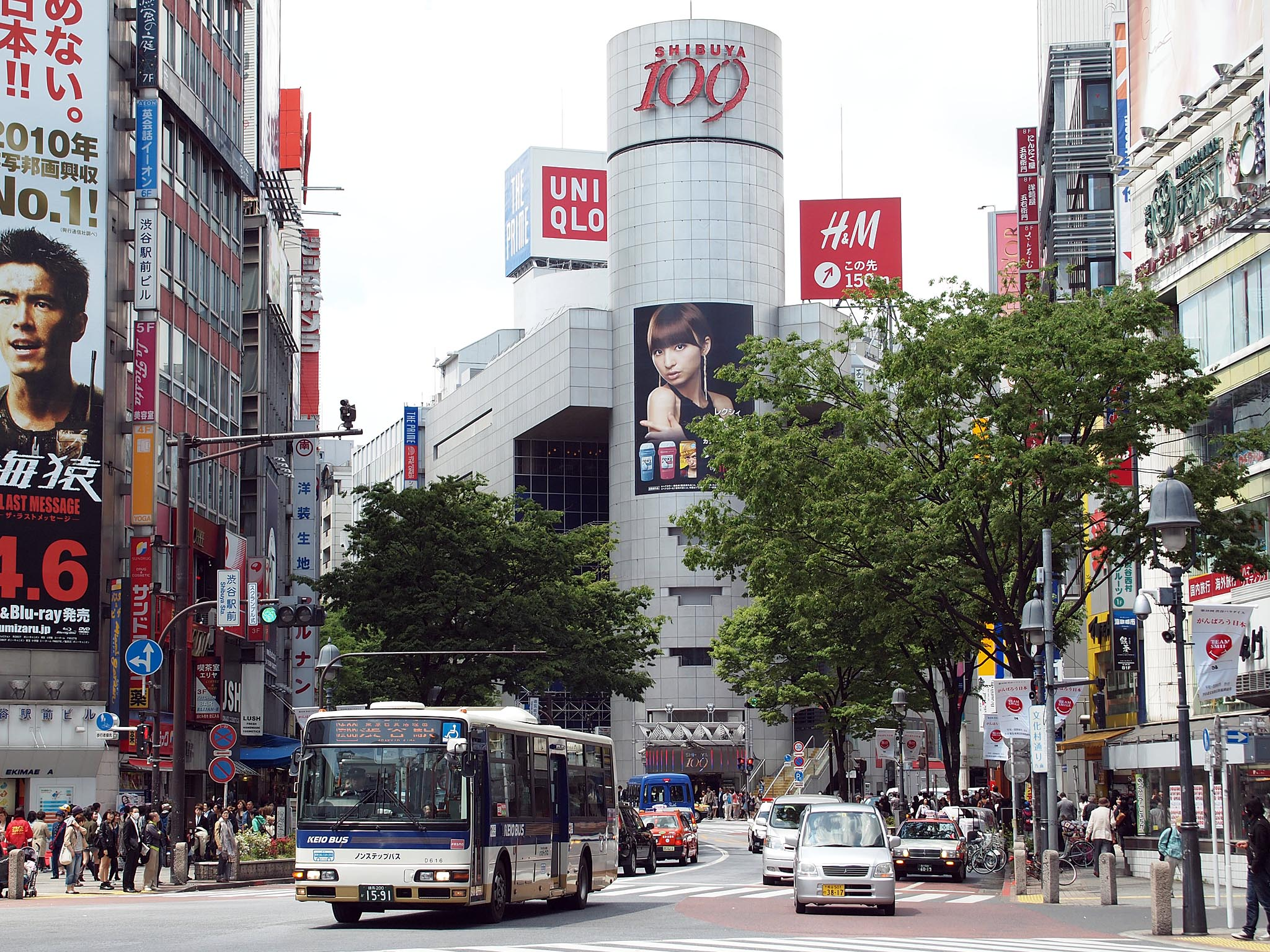
- Shibuya 109
- Interactive map of Dōgenzaka
- Country: Japan
- Prefecture: Tokyo
- Special ward: Shibuya

Population (1 October 2020)
  - Total: 591
- Time zone: UTC+09:00
- ZIP code: 150-0043
- Telephone area code: 03

Dōgenzaka (道玄坂) is a district of Shibuya, Tokyo, Japan.

As of October 2020, the population of this district is 591. The postal code for Dōgenzaka is 150–0043.

Local landmarks here include Shibuya 109, Bunkamura and the Statue of Hachikō.

== Geography ==
Dōgenzaka borders Udagawachō in the north, Sakuragaokachō to the south, and Nanpeidaichō to the west.

== Education ==
Shibuya Board of Education operates public elementary and junior high schools.

All of Dogenzaka (1 and 2-chome) is zoned to Jinnan Elementary School (神南小学校), and Shoto Junior High School (松濤中学校).
