= Nishihara, Shibuya =

District located in Shibuya-ku, Tokyo

Nishihara 西原
- District
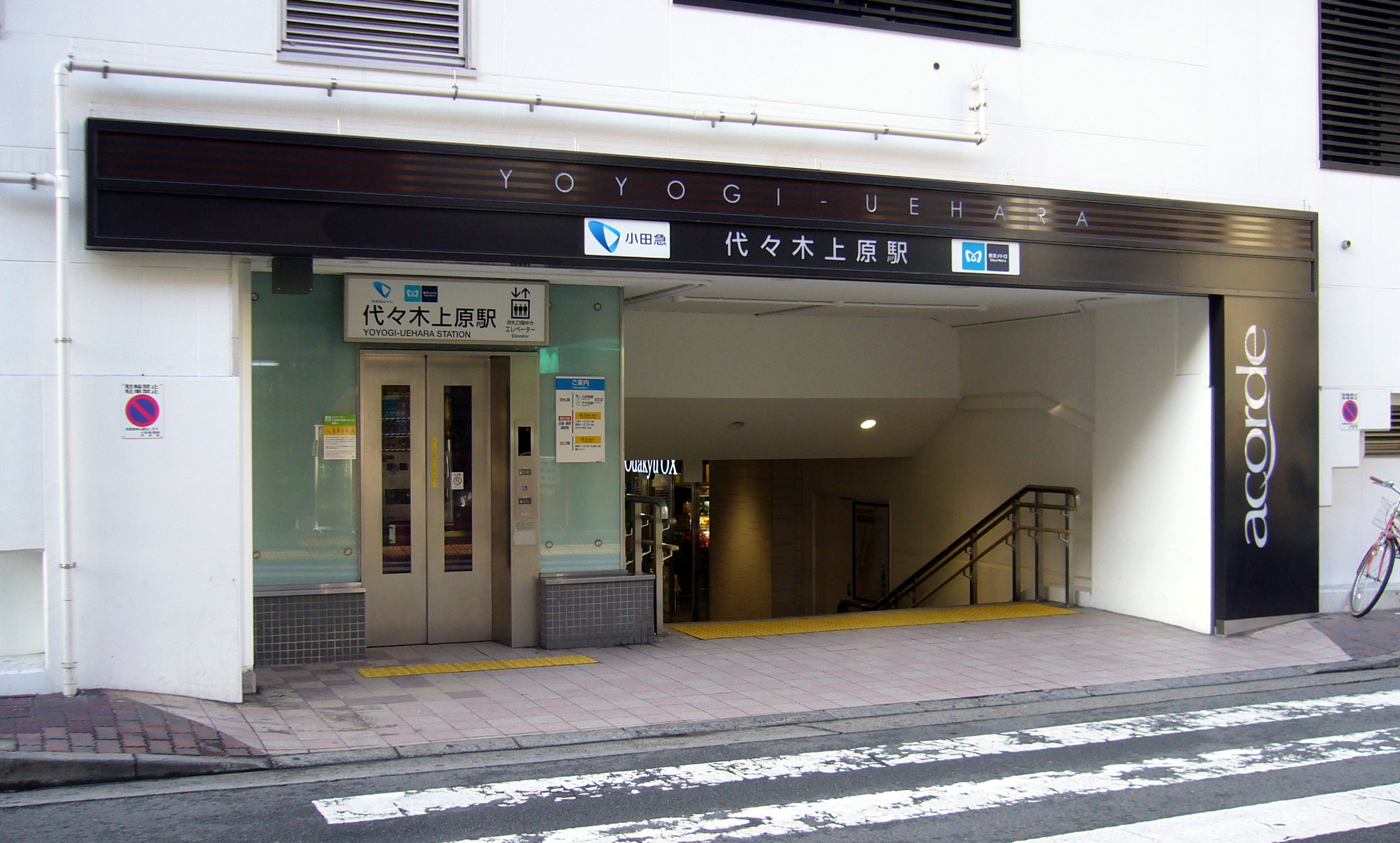
- Yoyogi-Uehara Station south entrance
- Interactive map of Nishihara
- Country: Japan
- Region: Shibuya
- Prefecture: Tokyo

Population (October 2020)
  - Total: 10,926
- Time zone: UTC+09:00 (JST)
- Postal code(s): 151-0066

Nishihara (西原) is a district of Shibuya, Tokyo, Japan.

As of October 2020, the population of this district is 10,926. The postal code for Nishihara is 151–0066.

== Geography ==
Nishihara borders Honmachi in the north, Hatsudai and Motoyoyogichō to the east, Uehara to the south, Ōyamachō to the southwest, and Hatagaya to the northwest.

== Demography ==
Population of Nishihara by Chōme (October 1, 2020)
District	Number of Households	Total Population	Male	Female
Nishihara 1-chōme	2,497	4,119	1,892	2,227
Nishihara 2-chōme	2,187	4,022	1,970	2,052
Nishihara 3-chōme	1,498	2,785	1,322	1,463
Total	6,182	10,926	5,184	5,742

Population Trend of Nishihara
Year	Total Population
2012	10,442
2013	10,579
2014	10,596
2015	10,696
2016	10,731
2017	10,806
2018	10,871
2019	10,986
2020 (October 1)	10,926

Population Trends of Nishihara by Citizenship and Sex
Year	Total Population	Female Population	Male Population	Japanese Population	Non-Japanese Population
2015	10,696	5,549	5,147	10,171	525
2016	10,731	5,584	5,147	10,244	487
2017	10,806	5,651	5,155	10,325	481
2018	10,871	5,685	5,186	10,385	486
2019	10,986	5,753	5,233	10,489	497
2020 (October 1)	10,926	5,742	5,184	10,519	407

== Education ==
Shibuya Board of Education operates public elementary and junior high schools.

All of Nishihara (1-3 chome) is zoned to Nishihara Elementary School (西原小学校), and Yoyogi Junior High School (代々木中学校).

Schools in Nishihara include:

- Nishihara Elementary School

== Transportation ==
Nearest stations are Yoyogi Uehara and Hatagaya.

== Places of Interest ==
- National Institute of Technology and Evaluation
- Japan International Cooperation Agency (JICA) Tokyo Center
- Yoyogi Ōyama Park
- Yoyogi Nishihara Park
- Shibuya Ward Sports Center
