= Sasazuka =

District located in Shibuya-ku, Tokyo

Sasazuka 笹塚
- District
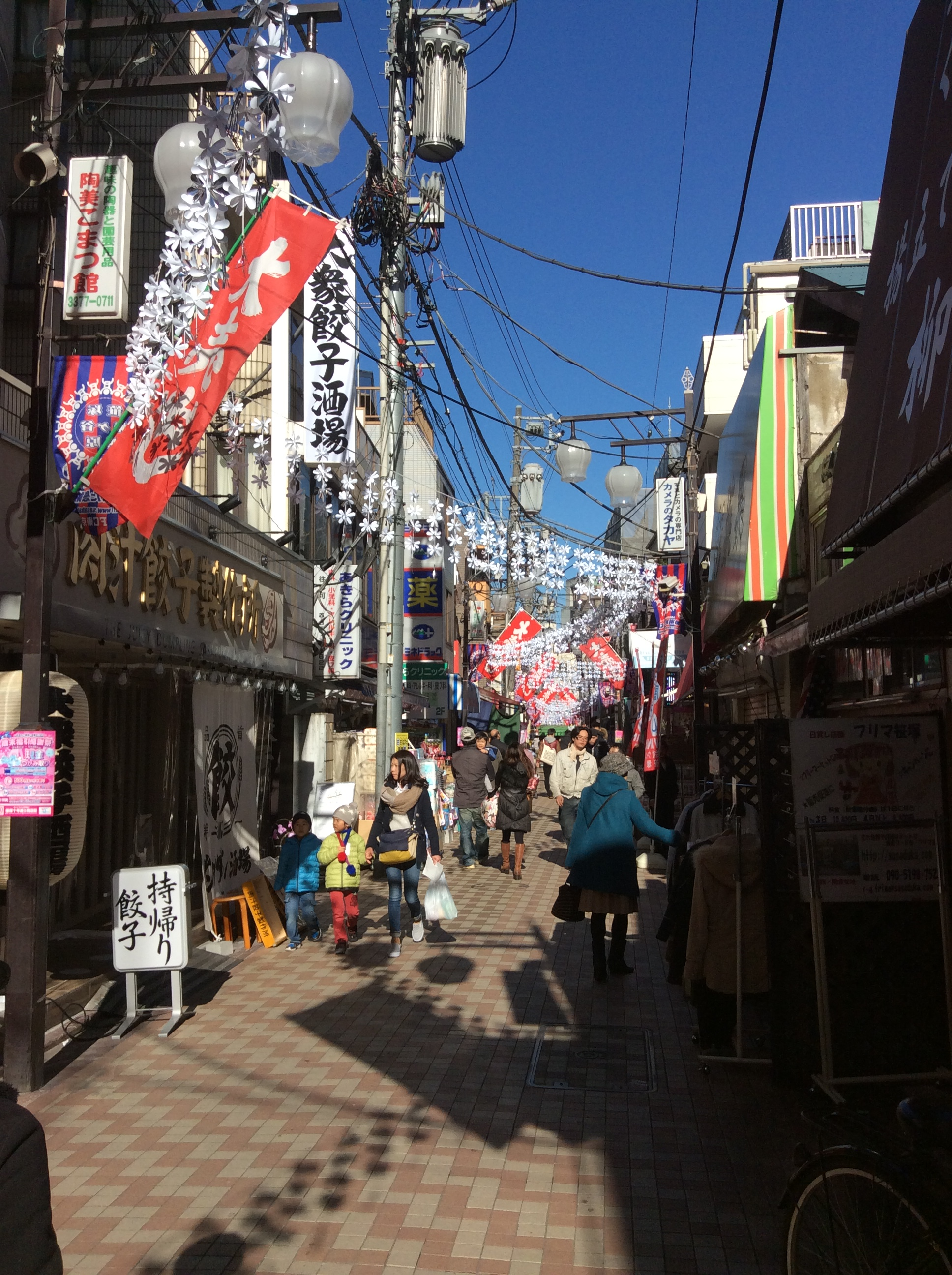
- Jugo Dori
- Interactive map of Sasazuka
- Coordinates: 35°40′30″N 139°40′00″E
- Country: Japan
- Prefecture: Tokyo
- Special ward: Shibuya

Population (October 2020)
  - Total: 16,763
- Time zone: UTC+09:00 (JST)
- Postal code(s): 151-0073

Sasazuka (笹塚) is a district of Shibuya, Tokyo, Japan.

As of October 2020, the population of this district is 16,763. The postal code for Sasazuka is 151-0073.

== Geography ==
Sasazuka borders Minamidai in the north, Hatagaya to the east, Shimokitazawa to the south, Ōhara in the southwest, and Hōnan to the north and west.

== Demography ==
Population of Sasazuka by Chōme (October 1, 2020)
District	Number of Households	Total Population	Male	Female
Sasazuka 1-chōme	4,433	6,705	3,175	3,530
Sasazuka 2-chōme	4,055	5,665	2,745	2,920
Sasazuka 3-chōme	2,838	4,447	2,813	2,264
Hiroo 4-chōme	2,291	4,262	1,756	2,506
Hiroo 5-chōme	2,079	3,181	1,360	1,821
Total	11,326	16,817	8,103	8,714

Population Trend of Sasazuka
Year	Total Population
2012	15,335
2013	15,397
2014	15,510
2015	15,851
2016	16,228
2017	16,321
2018	16,401
2019	16,710
2020 (October 1)	16,817

Population Trends of Sasazuka by Citizenship and Sex
Year	Total Population	Female Population	Male Population	Japanese Population	Non-Japanese Population
2015	15,851	8,205	7,646	15,476	375
2016	16,228	8,392	7,836	15,801	427
2017	16,321	8,450	7,871	15,856	465
2018	16,401	8,508	7,893	15,926	475
2019	16,710	8,687	8,023	16,154	556
2020 (October 1)	16,817	8,714	8,103	16,285	532

== Education ==
Shibuya Board of Education operates public elementary and junior high schools.

Sasazuka 1-2 chome, and 3-chome 1-39 and 56-64 ban are zoned to Sasazuka Elementary School (笹塚小学校). Sasazuka 3chome 40-55-ban are zoned to Nakahata Elementary School (中幡小学校). All of Sasazuka (1-3 chome) is zoned to Sasazuka Junior High School (笹塚中学校).

Schools in Sasazuka:

- Sasazuka Elementary School (渋谷区立笹塚小学校)
- Sasazuka Junior High School (渋谷区立笹塚中学校)
- Fujimigaoka High School for Girls (富士見丘中学校・高等学校) - Private school

== Gallery ==
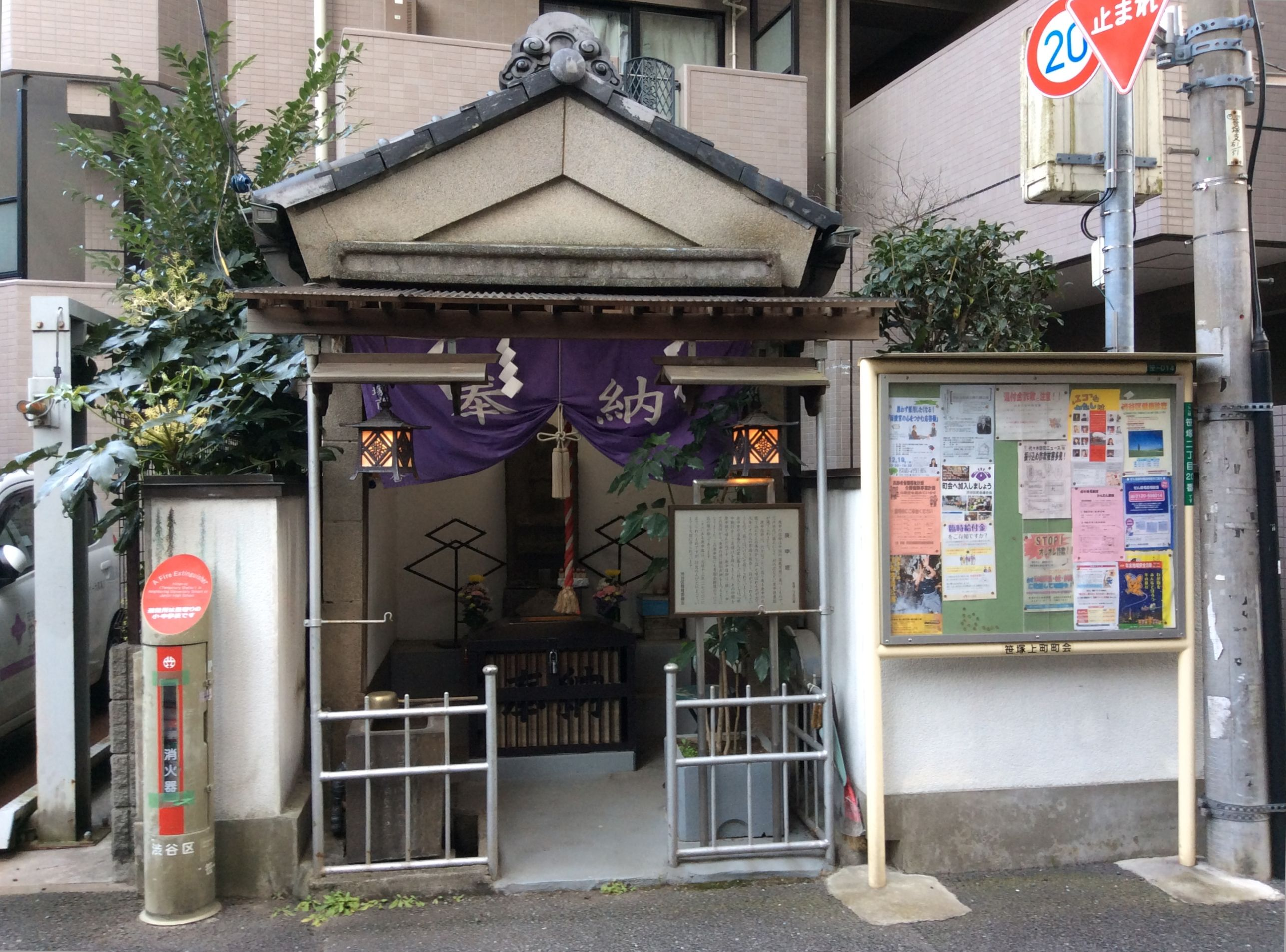
Sasazuka Kōshin-do

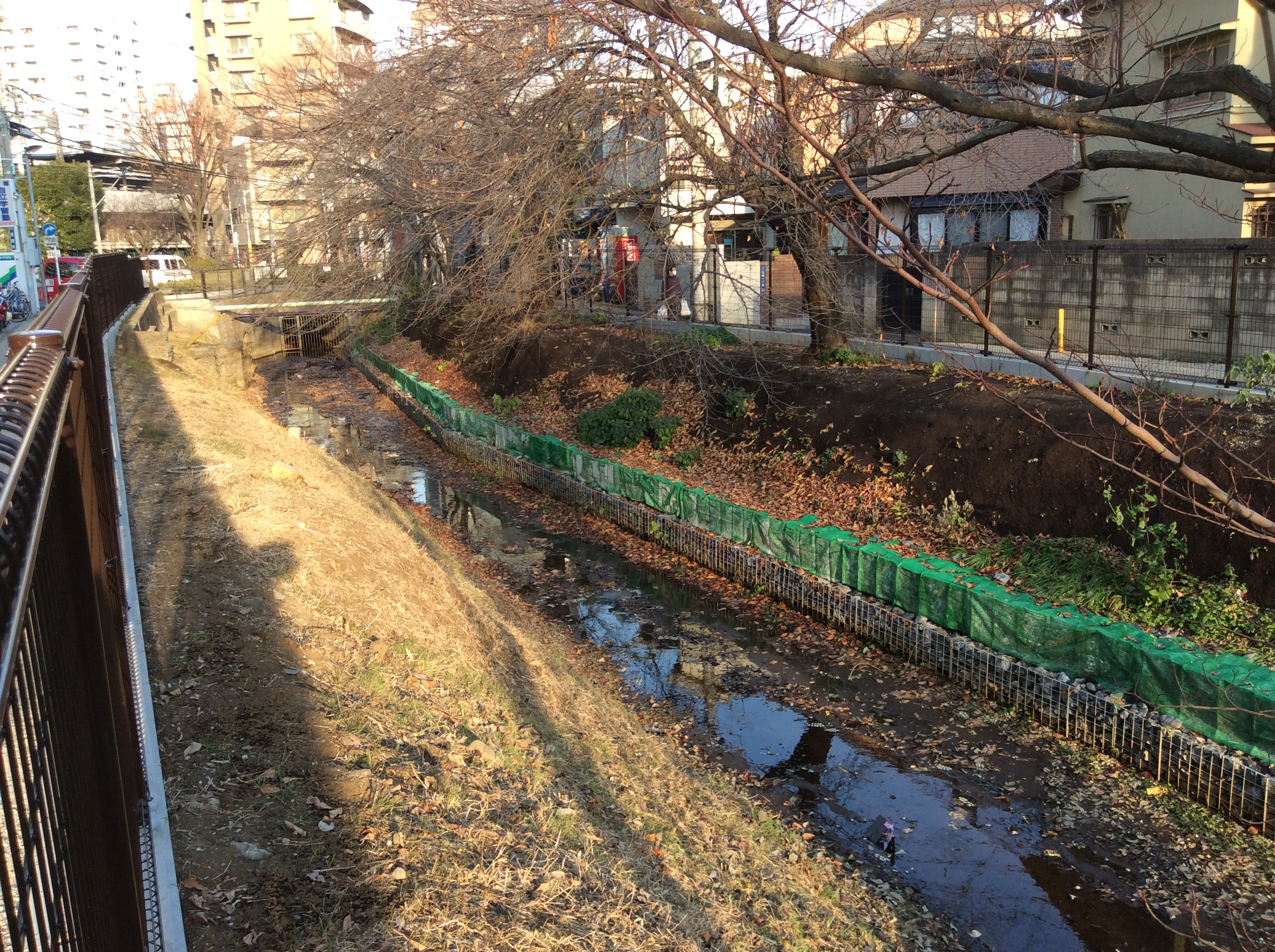
Tamagawa Aqueduct

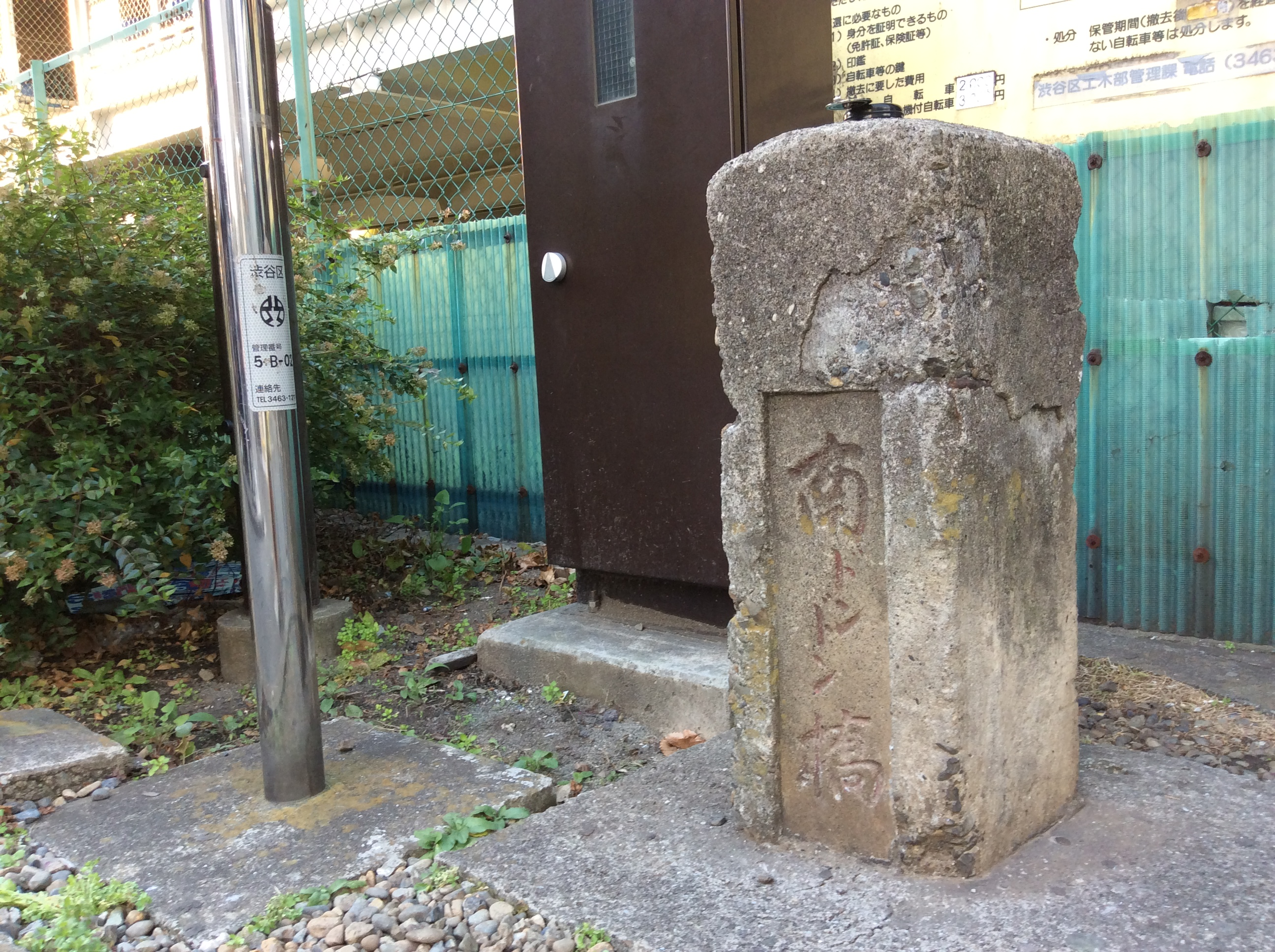
Remains of the "Minami-dondon-bashi" (near Sasazuka Station)

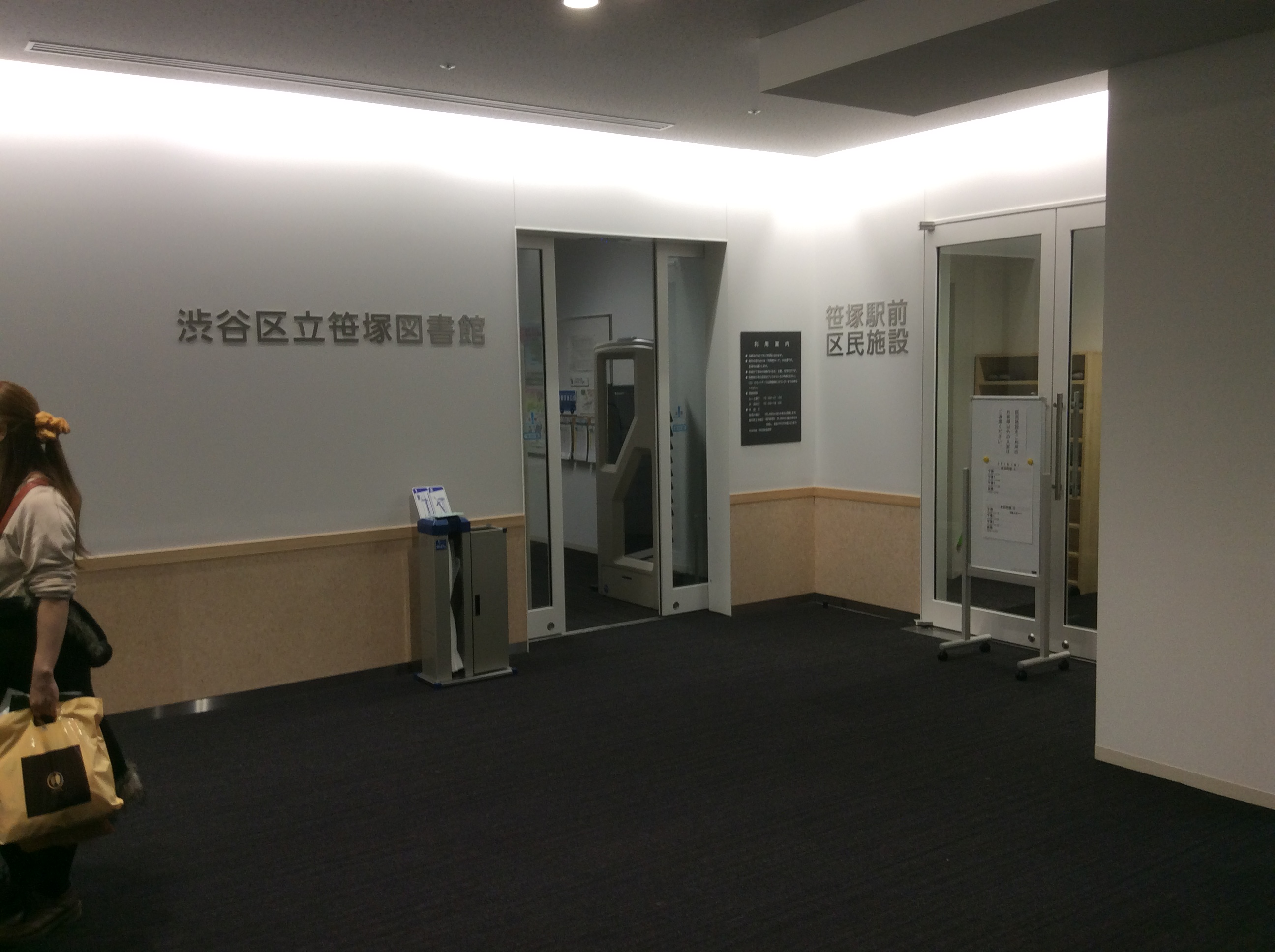
Shibuya City Sasazuka Library

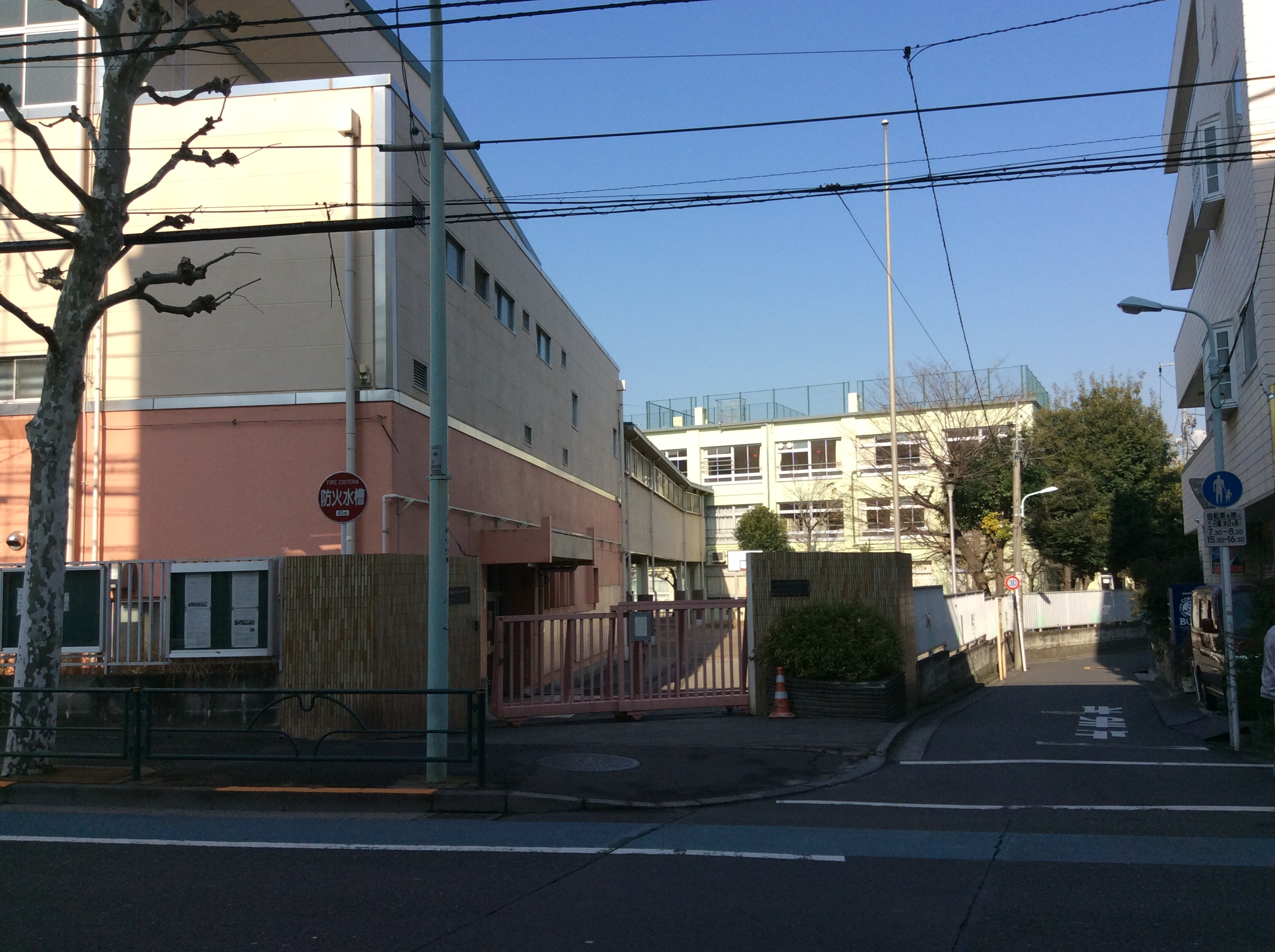
Sasazuka Junior High School

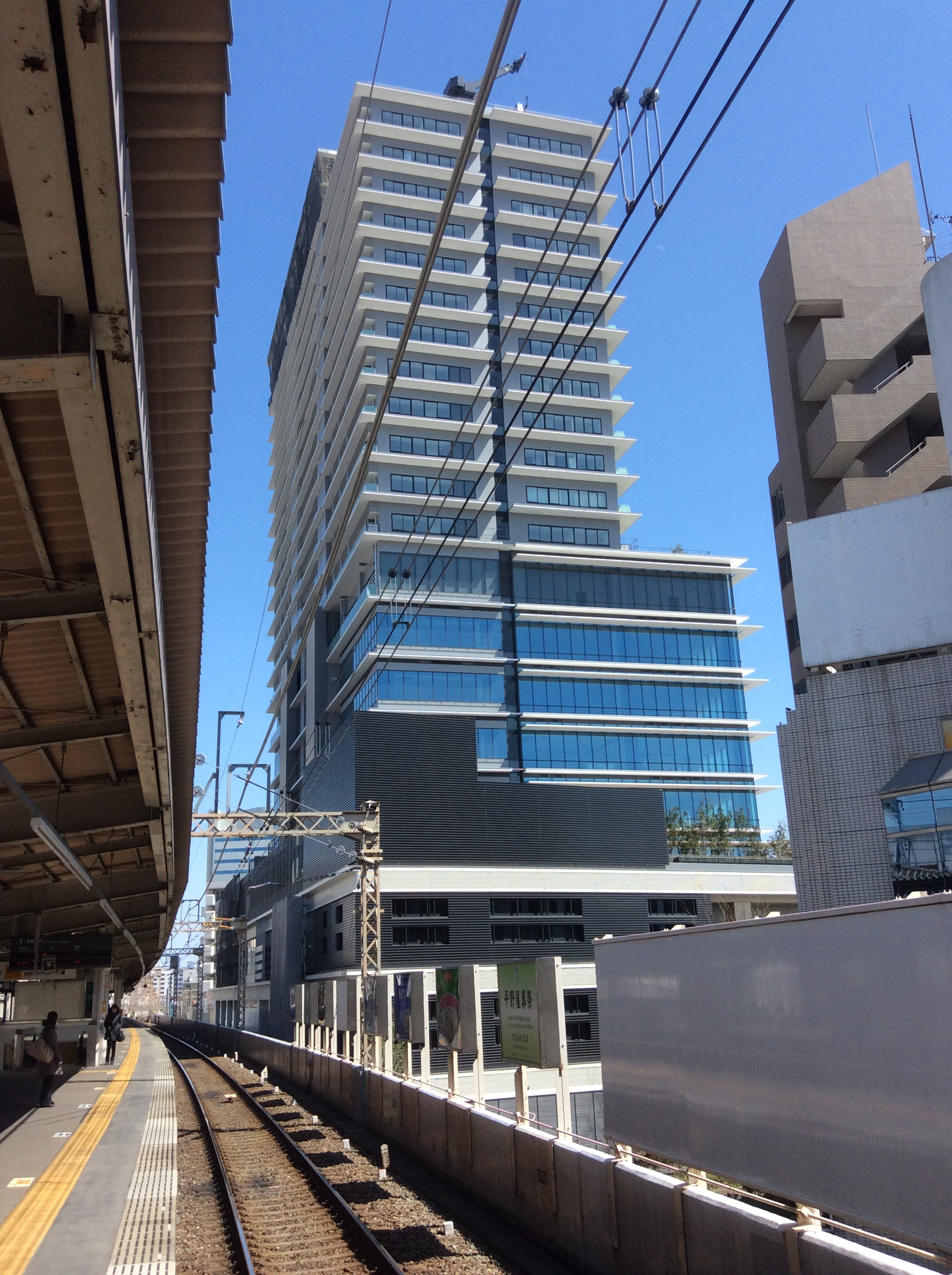
Merkmal Keio Sasazuka

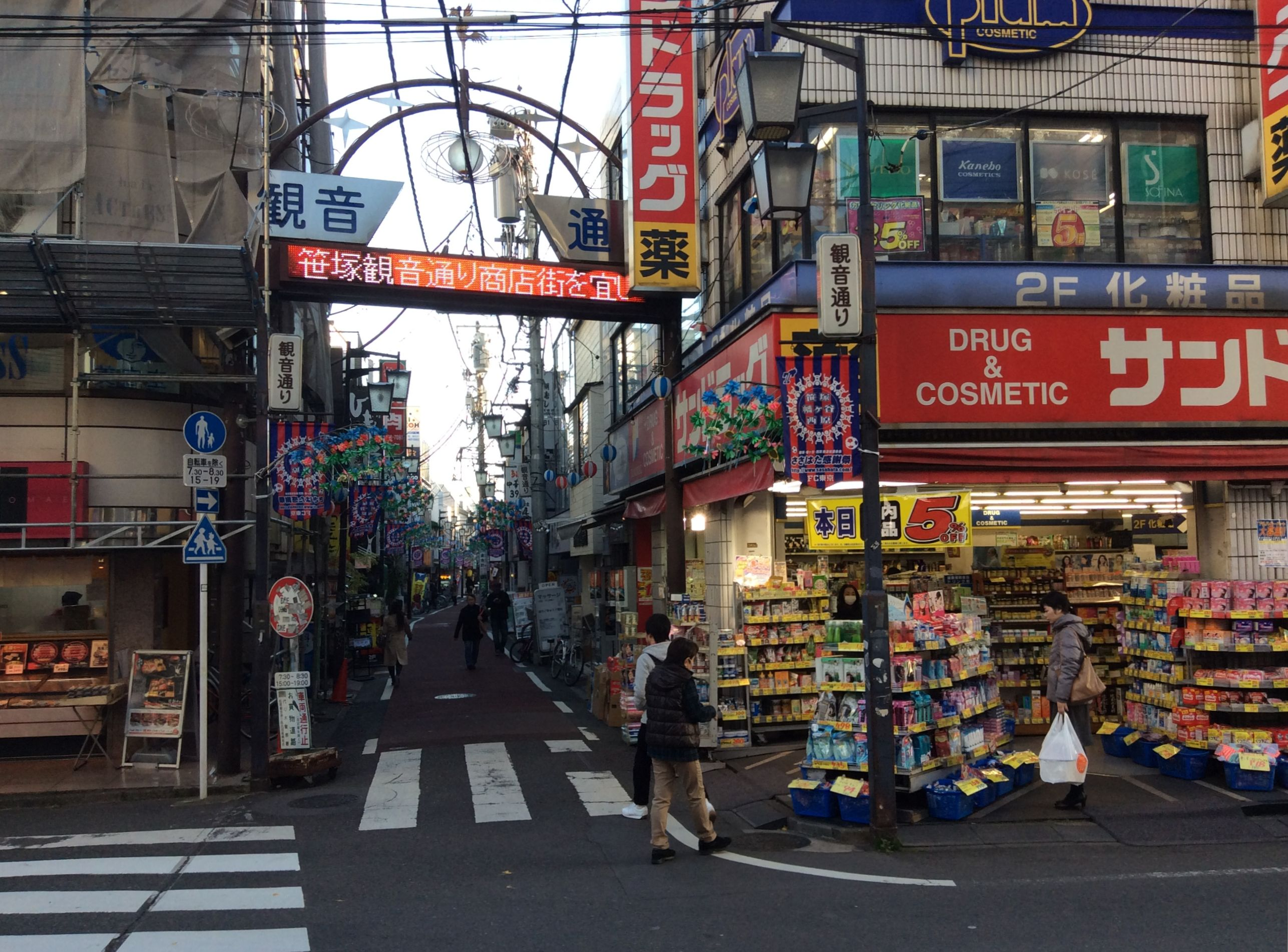
Sasazuka Kannon Dori Shopping Street

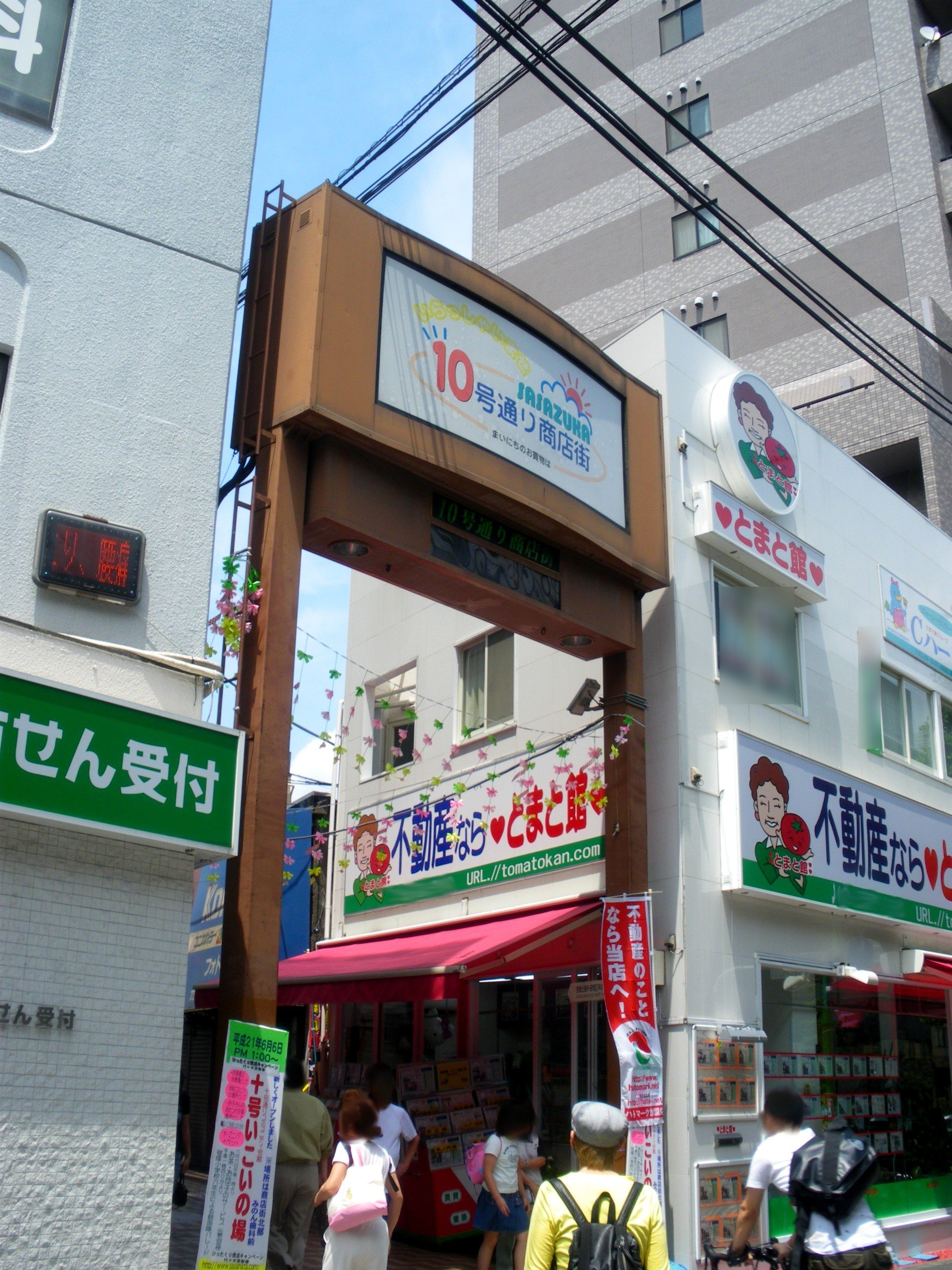
Sasazuka Jugo Dori Shopping Street

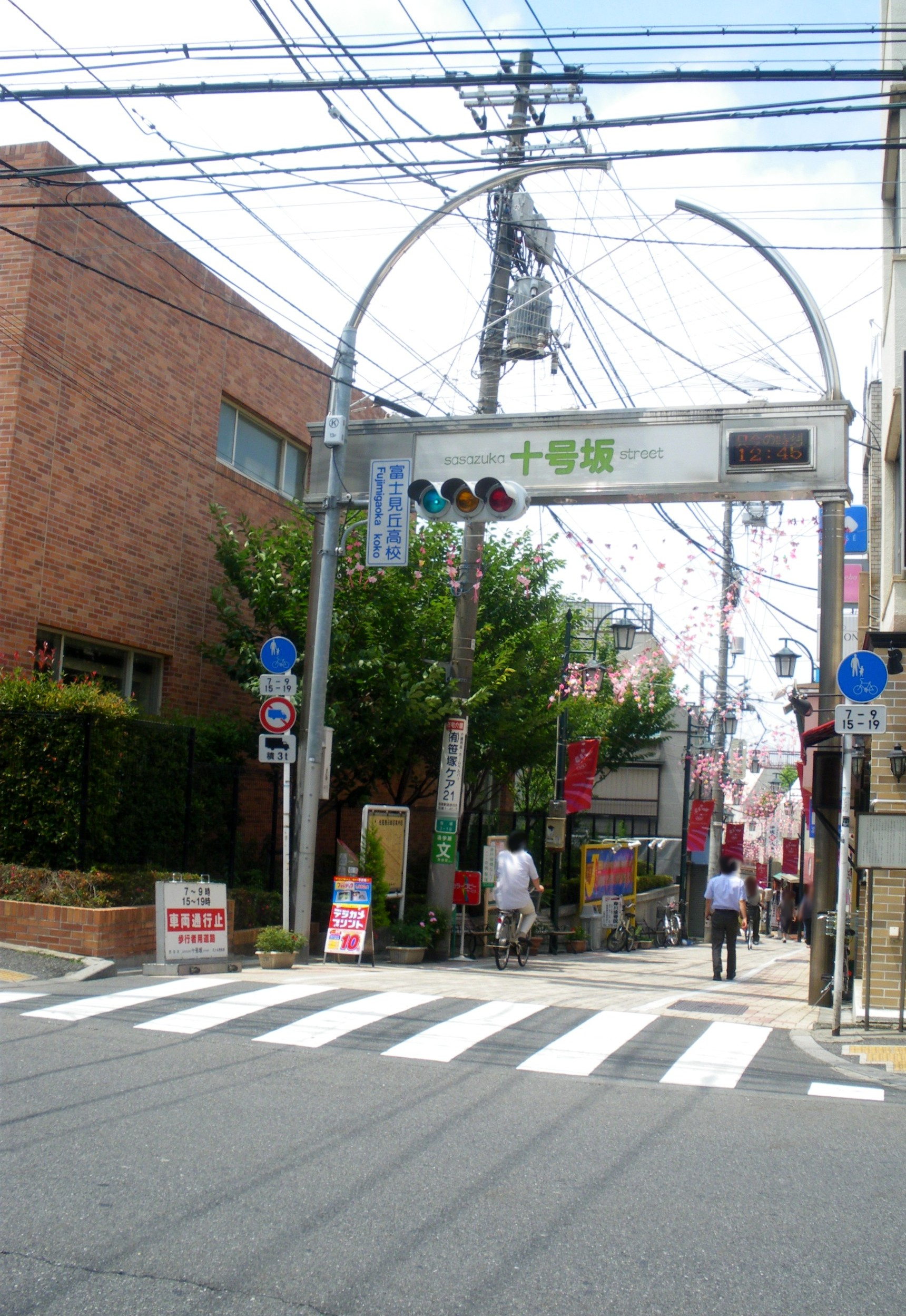
Sasazuka Jugo Zaka Shopping Street

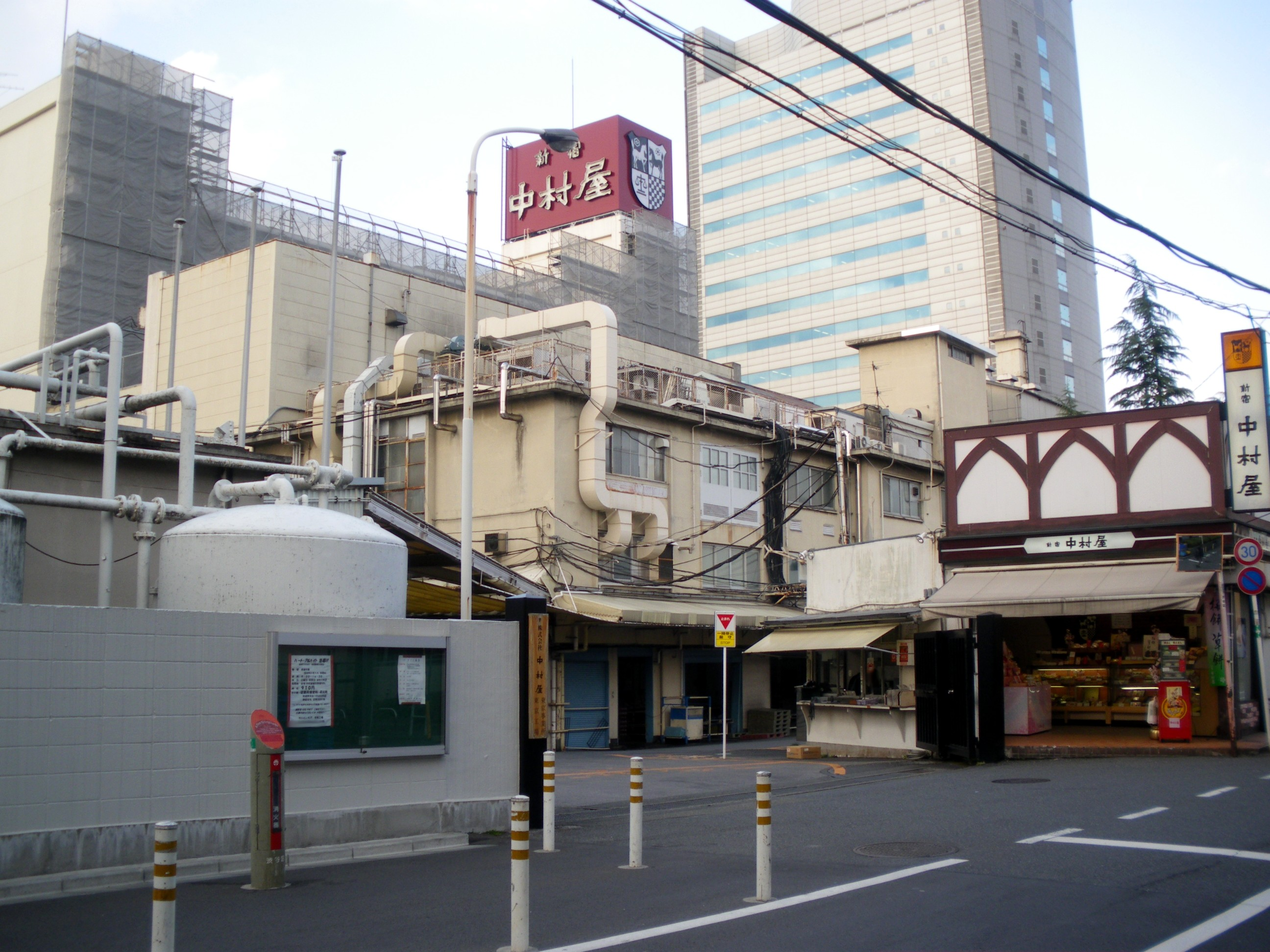
Nakamuraya factory

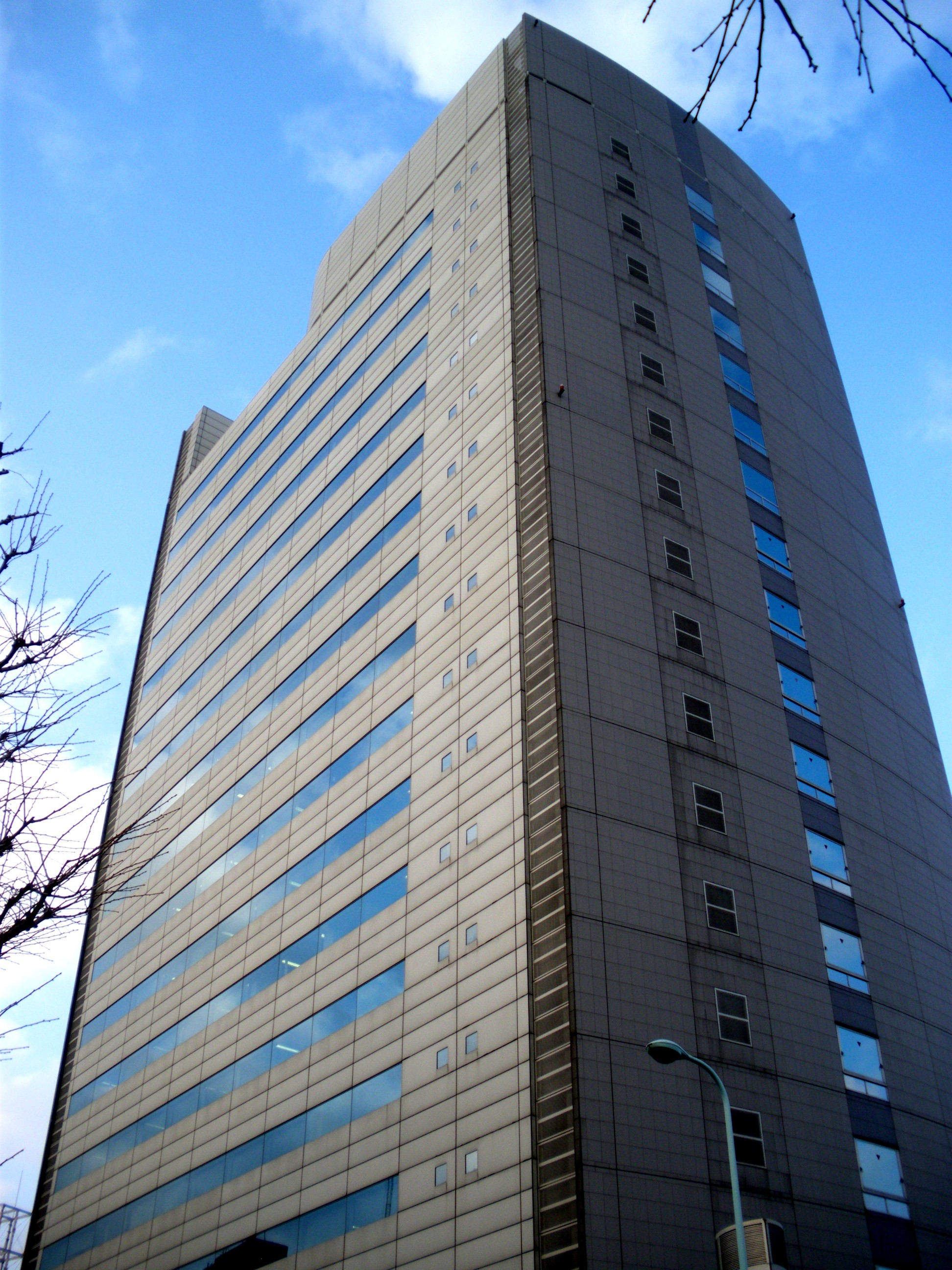
Daiwa Sasazuka Tower

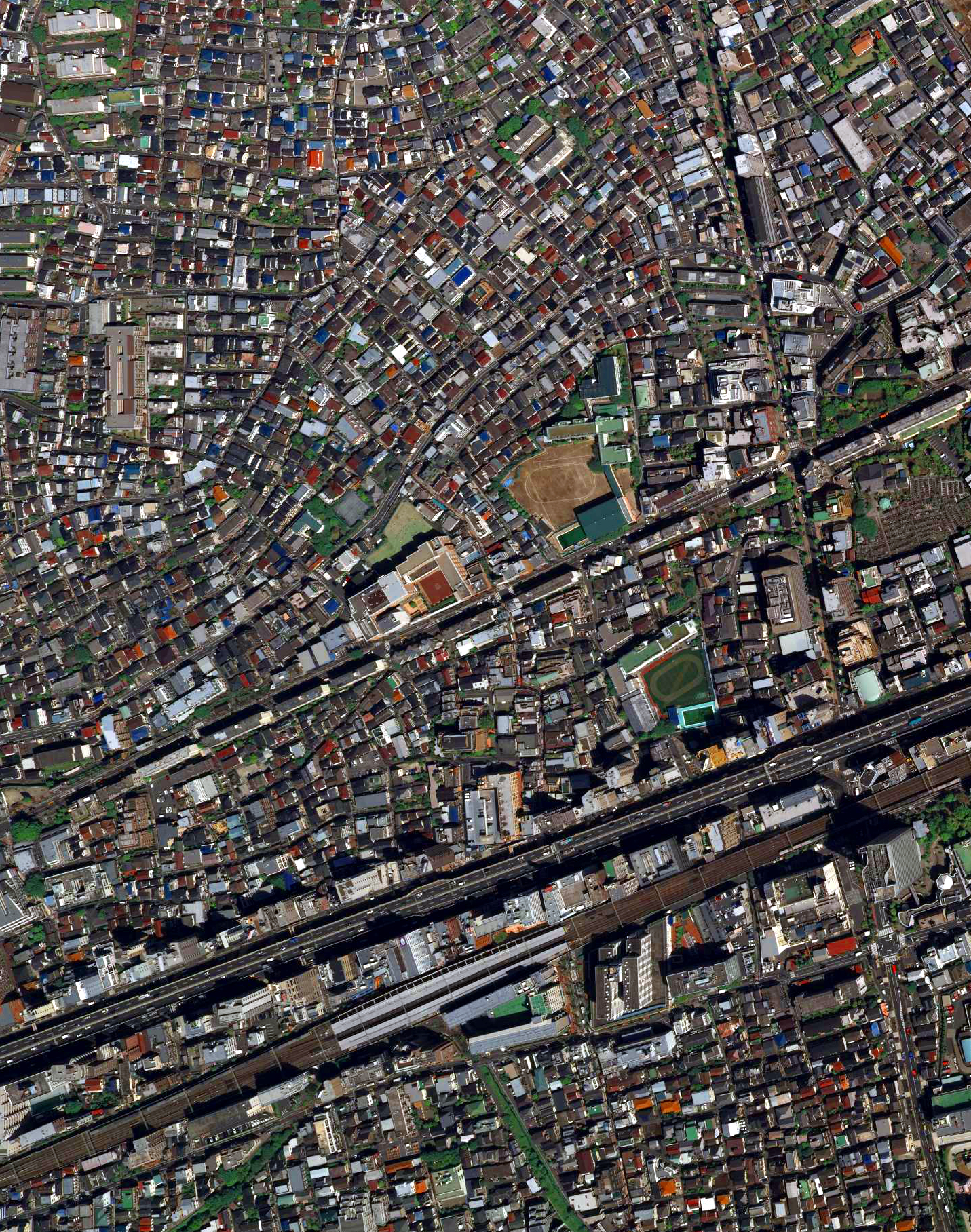
Sasazuka from above
