= Motoyoyogichō =

District in Shibuya, Tokyo, Japan

Motoyoyogichō 元代々木町
- Neighborhood in Shibuya
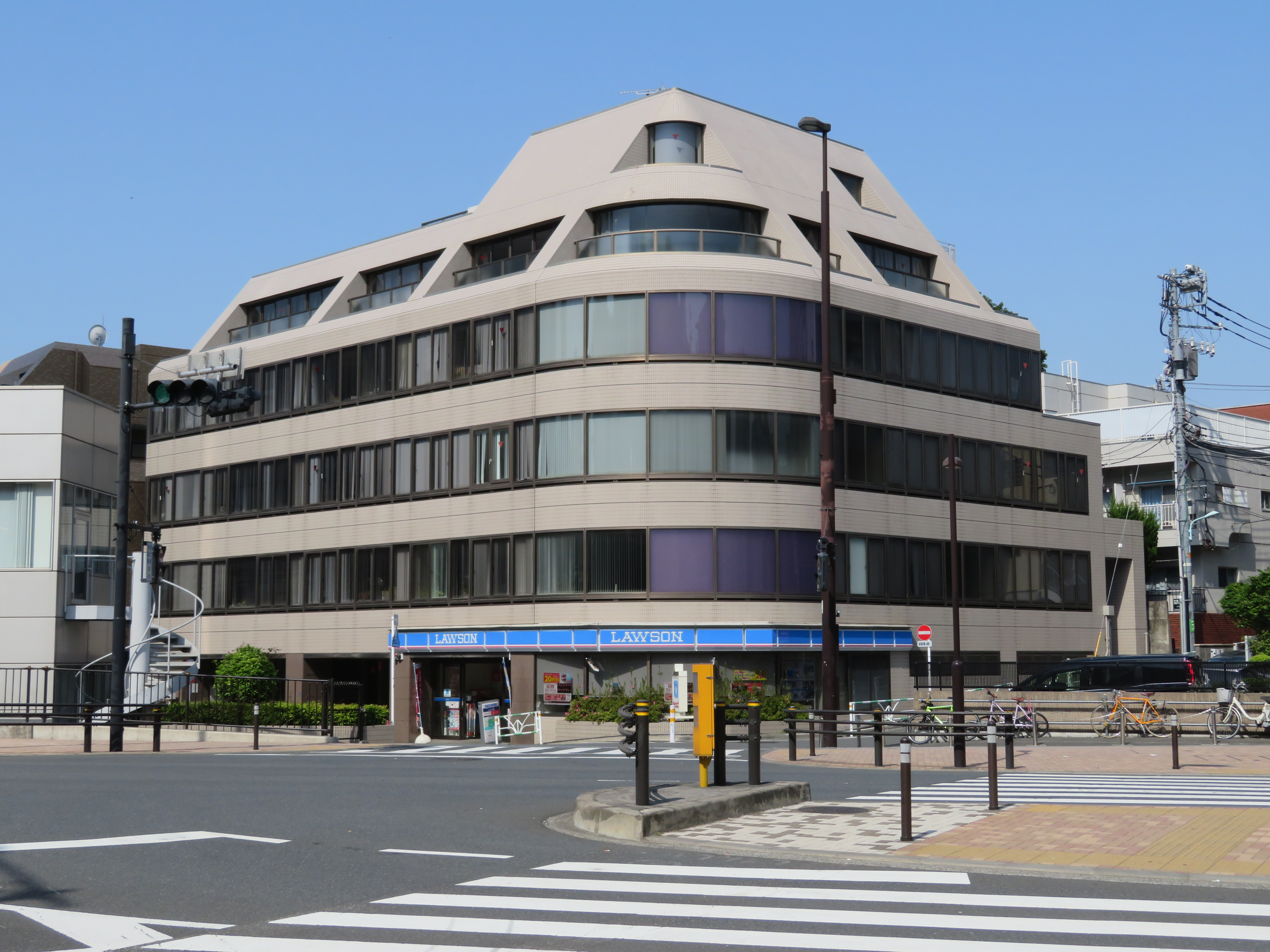
- Motoyoyogi Sunsun Building
- Interactive map of Motoyoyogichō
- Coordinates: 35°40′14″N 139°41′10″E
- Country: Japan
- Prefecture: Tokyo
- Special ward: Shibuya

Population (1 November)
  - Total: 3,802
- Time zone: UTC+09:00
- ZIP code: 151-0062
- Telephone area code: 03

Motoyoyogichō (元代々木町) is a district of Shibuya, Tokyo, Japan.

As of November 2020, the population of this district is 3,802. The postal code for Motoyoyogichō is 151-0062.

== Geography ==
Motoyoyogichō borders Hatsudai in the north, Yoyogi to the east, Uehara to the south, and Nishihara to the west.

== Demography ==
Population of Motoyoyogichō by Chōme (November 1, 2020)
District	Number of Households	Total Population	Male	Female
Motoyoyogichō	2,257	3,802	1,722	2,080
Total	2,257	3,802	1,722	2,080

Population Trend of Motoyoyogichō
Year	Total Population
2012	3,344
2013	3,425
2014	3,471
2015	3,454
2016	3,542
2017	3,609
2018	3,626
2019	3,646
2020 (November 1)	3,802

Population Trends of Motoyoyogichō by Citizenship and Sex
Year	Total Population	Female Population	Male Population	Japanese Population	Non-Japanese Population
2015	3,454	1,864	1,590	3,362	92
2016	3,542	1,946	1,596	3,429	113
2017	3,609	1,992	1,617	3,479	130
2018	3,626	1,989	1,637	3,502	124
2019	3,646	1,989	1,657	3,532	114
2020 (November 1)	3,802	2,080	1,722	3,688	114

== Places of interest ==
=== Cultural ===
==== Temples ====
- Ōkeiji (應慶寺) (Motoyoyogichō 24–3)

=== Embassies ===
- Embassy of Vietnam (Motoyoyogichō 50–11)

== Education ==
Shibuya Board of Education operates public elementary and junior high schools.

All of Motoyoyogicho is zoned to Tomigaya Elementary School (富谷小学校), and Uehara Junior High School (上原中学校).

Nurseries and kindergartens:

- Motoyoyogi Nursery (元代々木保育園) (Motoyoyogichō 51–19)
- Zion Kindergarten (シオン幼稚園) (Motoyoyogichō 26–1)
