= Honmachi, Shibuya =

District located in Shibuya-ku, Tokyo

Honmachi 本町
- Residential district
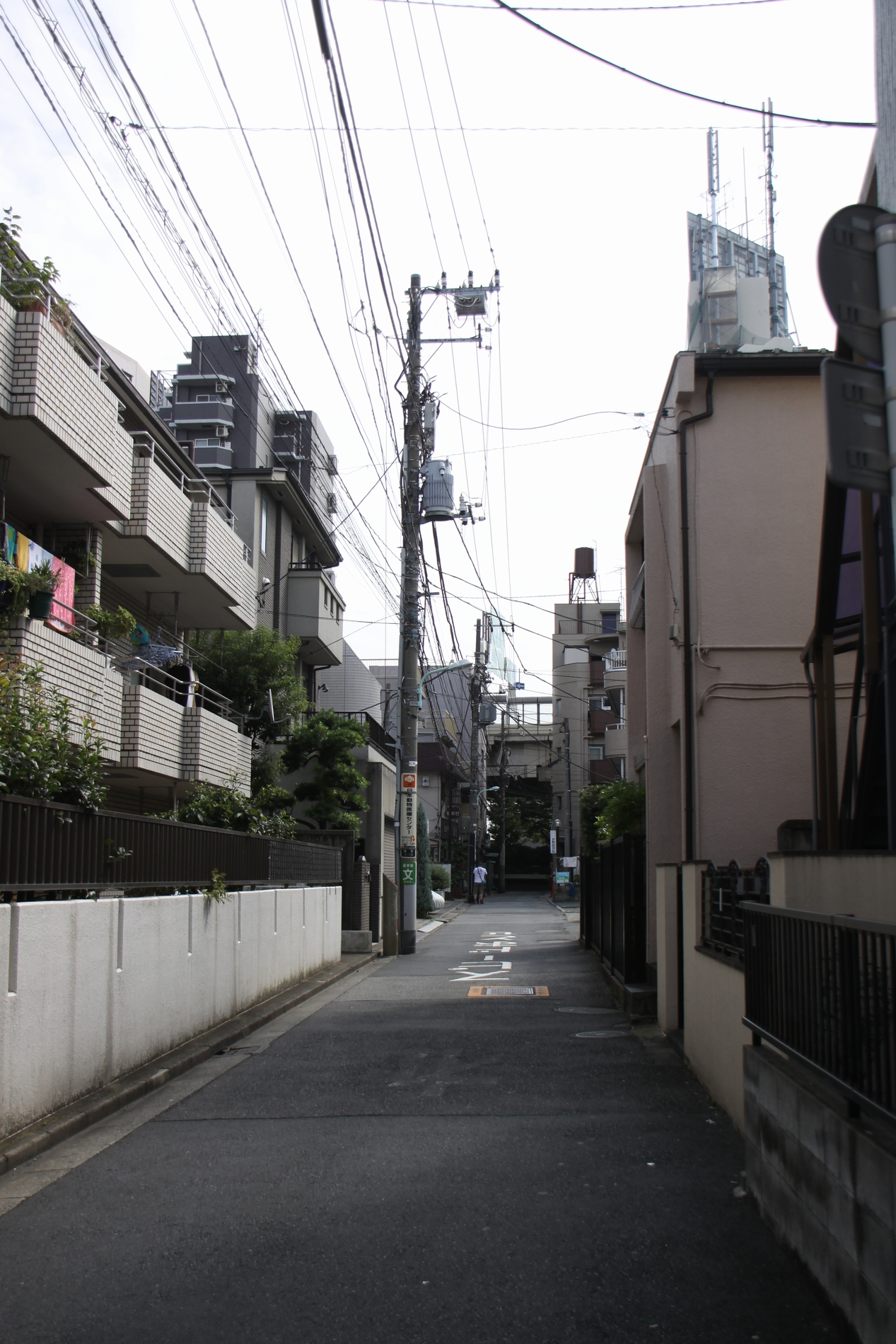
- Honmachi
- Interactive map of Honmachi
- Country: Japan
- Prefecture: Tokyo
- Special ward: Shibuya

Population (October 2020)
  - Total: 27,592
- Time zone: UTC+09:00 (JST)
- Postal code(s): 151-0071

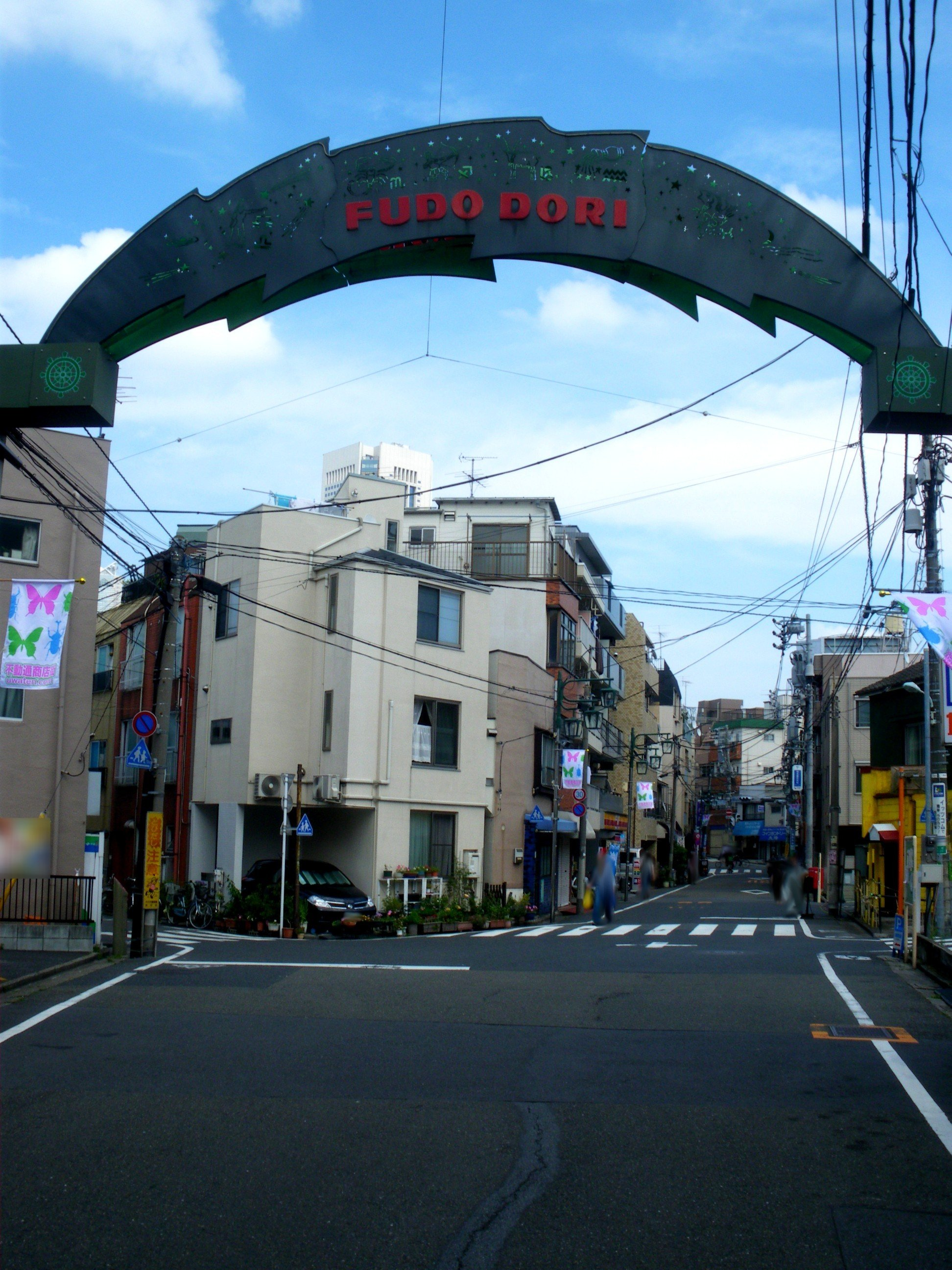
Fudo Dori Shopping Street

Honmachi (本町) is a residential district of Shibuya, Tokyo, Japan.

It is bordered by:

- Yayoicho and Minamidai to the north
- Nishi-Shinjuku to the east
- Hatagaya, to the southeast
- Hatsudai to the south

As of October 2020, the population of this district is 27,592. The postal code for Honmachi is 151-0071.

== Demography ==
Population of Honmachi by Chōme (October 1, 2020)
District	Number of Households	Total Population	Male	Female
Honmachi 1-chōme	3,648	5,382	2,654	2,728
Honmachi 2-chōme	3,076	4,748	2,381	2,367
Honmachi 3-chōme	3,191	4,766	2,437	2,329
Honmachi 4-chōme	2,945	4,683	2,394	2,289
Honmachi 5-chōme	2,345	4,000	2,083	1,917
Honmachi 6-chōme	2,685	4,013	2,057	1,956
Total	17,890	27,592	14,006	13,586

Population Trend of Honmachi
Year	Total Population
2012	25,124
2013	25,391
2014	25,719
2015	25,990
2016	26,166
2017	26,571
2018	26,815
2019	27,349
2020 (October 1)	27,592

Population Trends of Honmachi by Citizenship and Sex
Year	Total Population	Female Population	Male Population	Japanese Population	Non-Japanese Population
2015	25,990	12,736	13,254	25,096	894
2016	26,166	12,842	13,324	25,202	964
2017	26,571	13,032	13,539	25,535	1,036
2018	26,815	13,167	13,648	25,707	1,108
2019	27,349	13,486	13,863	26,093	1,256
2020 (October 1)	27,592	13,586	14,006	26,396	1,196

== Education ==
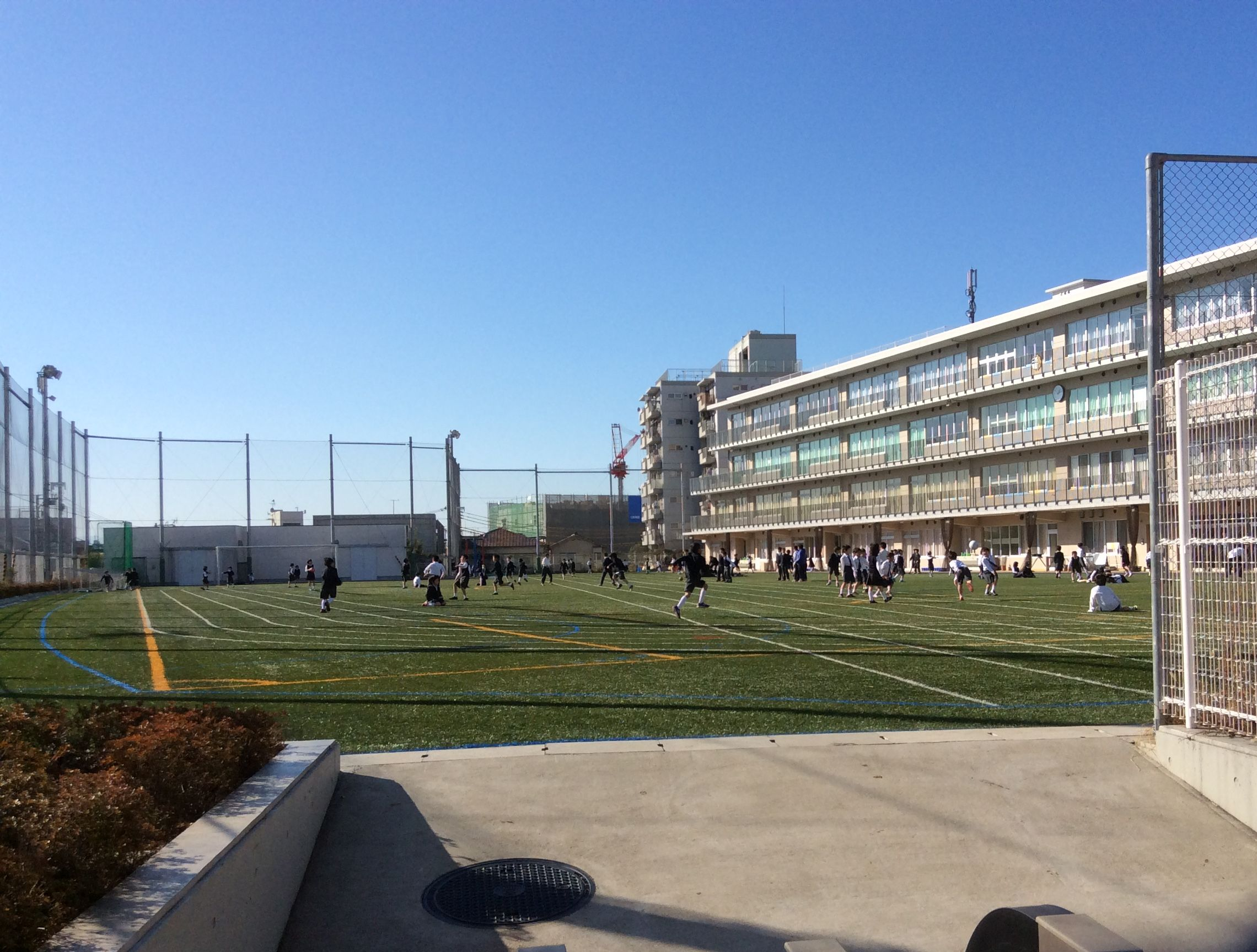
Shibuya Honmachi Gakuen (渋谷本町学園)

Shibuya Board of Education operates public elementary and junior high schools.

All of Honmachi 2 through 4-chome and parts of 5 through 6-chome are zoned to Shibuya Honmachi Gakuen (渋谷本町学園) for elementary school. Honmachi 1-chome is zoned to Hatashiro Elementary School (幡代小学校). Portions of Honmachi 5 and 6-chome are zoned to Nakahata Elementary School (中幡小学校).

All of Honmachi 1 through 4-chome and parts of 5 and 6-chome are zoned to Shibuya Honmachi Gakuen for junior high school. The remaining parts of 5 and 6-chome are zoned to Sasazuka Junior High School (笹塚中学校).

== Transportation ==
The only subway/train station in Honmachi is Hatsudai Station on the Keiō New Line, on the southern border of Honmachi near the Tokyo Opera City Tower.

The closest stations outside of Honmachi are:

- Nishi-shinjuku-gochome Station on the Toei Ōedo Line to the northeast.
- Nakano-sakaue Station (Tokyo Metro Marunouchi Line and Toei Ōedo Line) to the north.
- Hatagaya Station on the Keiō New Line to the southwest
- Nakano-shimbashi Station on the Tokyo Metro Marunouchi Line to the northwest.

Honmachi is also served by several bus lines:

- Keio Dentetsu Bus
- Hachiko Bus (Japanese)

== Honmachi public services/attractions ==
- Shogonji Buddhist Temple (Japanese Wikipedia)
- Honmachi Public Library (Japanese)
- Shibuya Ward Local Office (Japanese)
- New National Theatre, Tokyo
