= Kunio Makino =

Japanese painter (1925–1986)

- Born: 27 May 1925; Tokyo, Shibuya-ku Hatagaya
- Died: 1 October 1986 (aged 61); Tokyo, Seagaya-ku Shimouma
- Resting place: Tokyo, Taito-ku Yanaka 7-5-14 Yanaka Cemetery
- Education: Tokyo National University of Fine Arts and Music, Oil-Painting Department
- Notable work: 『IMPHAL』（1980） 『UNFINISHED PAGODA』（1975-）
- Spouse: Chiho Makino

Kunio Makino (27 May 1925 (Taisho 14) – 1 October 1986 (Showa 61)) was a Japanese painter, born in Hatagaya, Shibuya-ku, Tokyo.

== Early life and education ==
Kunio Makino was born in Hatagaya, Shibuya, Tokyo in 1925 and spent his childhood in Odawara. His parents died early in his life, and he was raised by his sisters who took over parental responsibilities.

His cousin, Shinichi Makino, a fantasy novelist, advised him to pursue education at Dai-ichi High School and the University of Tokyo. However, Makino chose an artistic path, first studying at the Kawabata Art Academy before advancing to oil painting studies at the Tokyo National University of Fine Arts and Music. In 1945, his education was interrupted when he was drafted into military service, ending the war stationed in Miyakonojō, Kyushu. After the war, he returned to complete his studies, graduating in 1948.

== Career and recognition ==
Makino established himself as a painter through consistent exhibition activity. He was selected for the Yasui Prize Newcomer Exhibition in both 1962 and 1965, and held his first private oil-painting exhibition in 1959, followed by nine more solo shows through 1984. Posthumously, his reserved exhibition was held at Bungei-shunju Gallery in 1988, showcasing his final works. The following year saw the publication of his painting collection “PEOPLE”, which led to a major traveling exhibition sponsored by The Asahi Shimbun newspaper from 1990 to 1991. A retrospective exhibition at the Nerima Art Museum in 2013 drew significant attention to his oeuvre.

Another significant moment in Makino's posthumous recognition cane in 2000, when his work was featured on the Japanese television program KAIUN! Nandemo Kanteidan. Remarkably, although Makino's name was virtually unknown to the viewing audience, they immediately recognised the exceptional quality and beauty of his painting, resulting in a high valuation. This belated appreciation highlighted Makino's lifelong dedication to his craft - a sixty-one-year artistic journey deeply influenced by his profound admiration for Dutch painter Rembrandt. In recent years, art critics and collectors have increasingly celebrated Makino's high-density works, which demonstrate his complete command of traditional techniques and his unique vision of realism.

== Artistic style and legacy ==
Makino was a rare artist who eschewed worldly fame, dedicating his sixty-one-year life to pursuing his personal vision of beauty. His paintings, often described as resembling inhabitants of a medieval fantasy world, consciously opposed the prevailing trend toward abstract expressionism. Instead, he developed a distinctive style of mysterious figurative painting that recalled Western Baroque traditions. His diverse subject matter included self-portraits inspired by Rembrandt, works based on classical literature and Ryūnosuke Akutagawa's novels, along with nudes, portraits, still lifes, and architectural studies.

== Personal life and family background ==
- Makino came from a distinguished samurai lineage – the Makino family had served the Odawara clan during the Edo period. His great-grandfather, Sakubei Hidekiyo Makino, was the twelfth master of Karaboko-ryu bar-jutsu for the Odawara clan.
- He was so devoted to Rembrandt that he wrote a letter to Rembrandt when he was in his twenties and a reply to a scolding from Rembrandt of his own composition.
- He followed his teacher Uzaburo Ihara's strict advice to paint more than twelve hours daily to become a true historical painter. Despite his talent, he remained outside mainstream recognition by avoiding art organizations and limiting exhibitions during the peak of abstract art's popularity. Notable admirers included Tetsuko Kuroyanagi, who commissioned her portrait after discovering his work through Geijutsu Shincho.
- After the war, he returned to Tokyo Art School and commuted to Ueno from his home in Odawara, where he had been evacuated to. After graduation, he moved to "McCall's School of Dressmaking", which his older sisters had started in front of Chigasaki Station, where he spent his early thirties. In Chigasaki, he taught fashion history, color studies, and design to students by making flyers, posters, and signboards for recruiting students, and painted pictures in a room of his house.

== Notable works ==
Makino's works have gone up for sale at public auction 176 times, mostly in the painting category. "Kunio Makino". Artprice. 9 August 2025. Notable works include:

- Armoured Youth (1972)
- Sea Battle (1975)
- Imphal (1980)
- Self-portrait in Armour (1986)
- Unfinished pagoda (1975-)
