= Minamidai =

District in Nakano, Tokyo, Japan

Minamidai 南台
- Neighborhood in Nakano
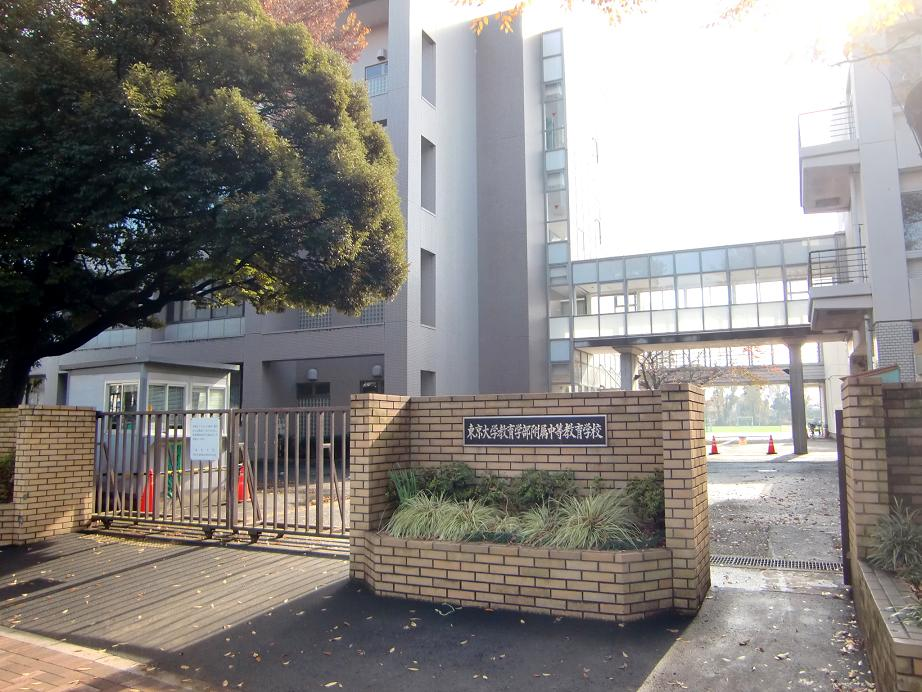
- Secondary School attached to the Faculty of Education, the University of Tokyo
- Interactive map of Minamidai
- Coordinates: 35°40′59″N 139°40′02″E
- Country: Japan
- Prefecture: Tokyo
- Special ward: Nakano

Population (1 October 2020)
  - Total: 20,698
- Time zone: UTC+09:00
- ZIP code: 164-0014
- Telephone area code: 03

Minamidai (南台) is a district of Nakano, Tokyo, Japan.

As of October 2020, the population of this district is 20,698. The postal code for Minamidai is 164-0014.

== Geography ==
Minamidai borders Yayoichō in the north, Honmachi to the east, Sasazuka and Hatagaya to the south, and Hōnan to the west.

== Education ==
Nakano City Board of Education (中野区教育委員会) operates public elementary and junior high schools.

1-2-chome are zoned to Minamino Elementary School (みなみの小学校). 3-5-chome are zoned to Minamidai Elementary School (南台小学校). All residents are zoned to Minami Nakano Junior High School (南中野中学校).
