= Uehara, Shibuya =

District in Shibuya, Tokyo, Japan

Uehara 上原
- Neighborhood in Shibuya
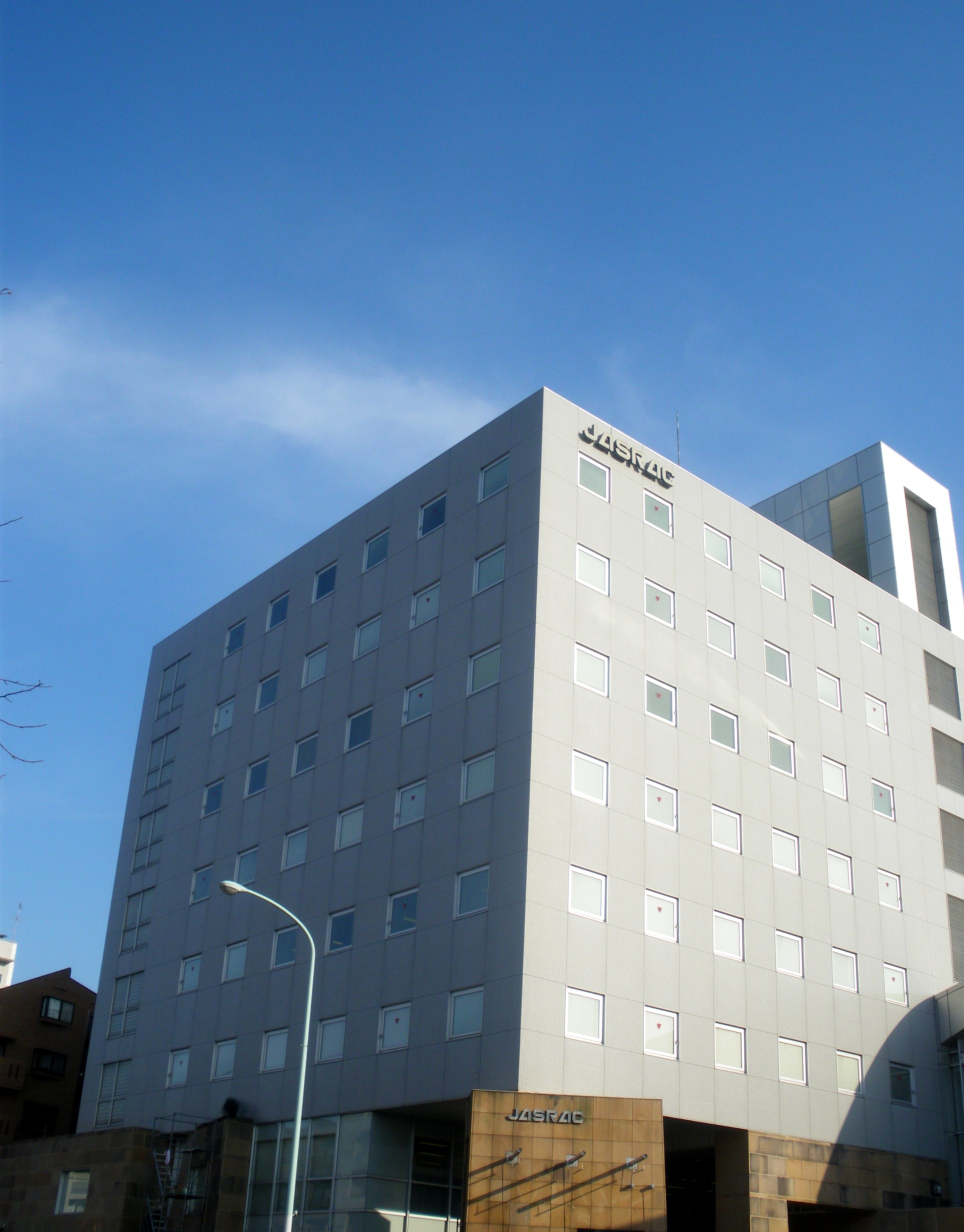
- Japanese Society for Rights of Authors, Composers and Publishers (JASRAC) Head Office
- Interactive map of Uehara
- Country: Japan
- Prefecture: Tokyo
- Special ward: Shibuya

Population (1 October 2020)
  - Total: 10,659
- Time zone: UTC+09:00
- ZIP code: 151-0064
- Telephone area code: 03

Uehara (上原) is a district of Shibuya, Tokyo, Japan.

As of October 2020, the population of this district is 10,659. The postal code for Uehara is 151-0064.

The embassy of Côte d'Ivoire is located here, while local landmarks include the Koga Masao Museum of Music and the head offices of JASRAC.

== Geography ==
Uehara borders Nishihara in the north, Tomigaya to the east, Komaba to the south, Shimokitazawa to the west, and Ōyamachō to the northwest.

== Demography ==
Population of Uehara by Chōme (October 1 2020)
| District | Number of Households | Total Population | Male | Female |
|---|---|---|---|---|
| Uehara 1-chōme | 1,997 | 3,131 | 1,448 | 1,683 |
| Uehara 2-chōme | 2,235 | 4,327 | 2,043 | 2,284 |
| Uehara 3-chōme | 1,713 | 3,201 | 1,479 | 1,722 |
| Total | 5,945 | 10,659 | 4,970 | 5,689 |

Population Trend of Uehara
| Year | Total Population |
|---|---|
| 2012 | 9,222 |
| 2013 | 9,310 |
| 2014 | 9,536 |
| 2015 | 9,876 |
| 2016 | 9,959 |
| 2017 | 10,166 |
| 2018 | 10,290 |
| 2019 | 10,498 |
| 2020 (October 1) | 10,659 |

Population Trends of Uehara by Citizenship and Sex
| Year | Total Population | Female Population | Male Population | Japanese Population | Non-Japanese Population |
|---|---|---|---|---|---|
| 2015 | 9,876 | 5,277 | 4,599 | 9,435 | 441 |
| 2016 | 9,959 | 5,316 | 4,643 | 9,539 | 420 |
| 2017 | 10,166 | 5,397 | 4,769 | 9,724 | 442 |
| 2018 | 10,290 | 5,491 | 4,799 | 9,851 | 439 |
| 2019 | 10,498 | 5,615 | 4,883 | 10,030 | 468 |
| 2020 (October 1) | 10,659 | 5,689 | 4,970 | 10,222 | 437 |

== Education ==
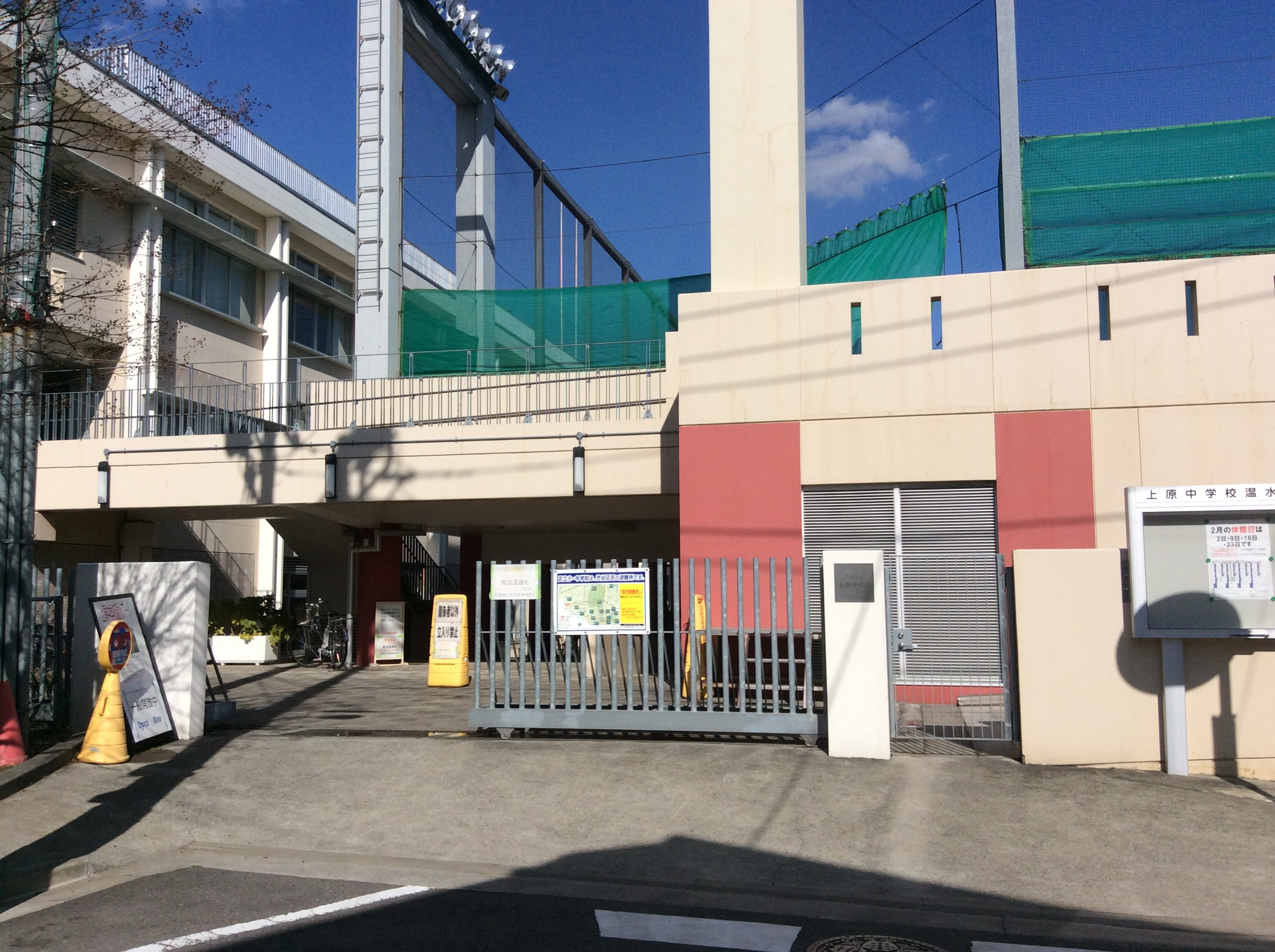
Uehara Junior High School (渋谷区立上原中学校)

Shibuya Board of Education operates public elementary and junior high schools.

Uehara 2 and 3-chome and 1-chome 6-40-ban are zoned to Uehara Elementary School (渋谷区立上原小学校). Uehara 1-chome 1-5 and 41-47-ban are zoned to Tomigaya Elementary School (渋谷区立富谷小学校). All of Uehara (1 through 3 chome) is zoned to Uehara Junior High School (渋谷区立上原中学校).

Schools in Uehara:

- Tomigaya Elementary School (渋谷区立富谷小学校)
- Uehara Elementary School (渋谷区立上原小学校)
- Uehara Junior High School (渋谷区立上原中学校)
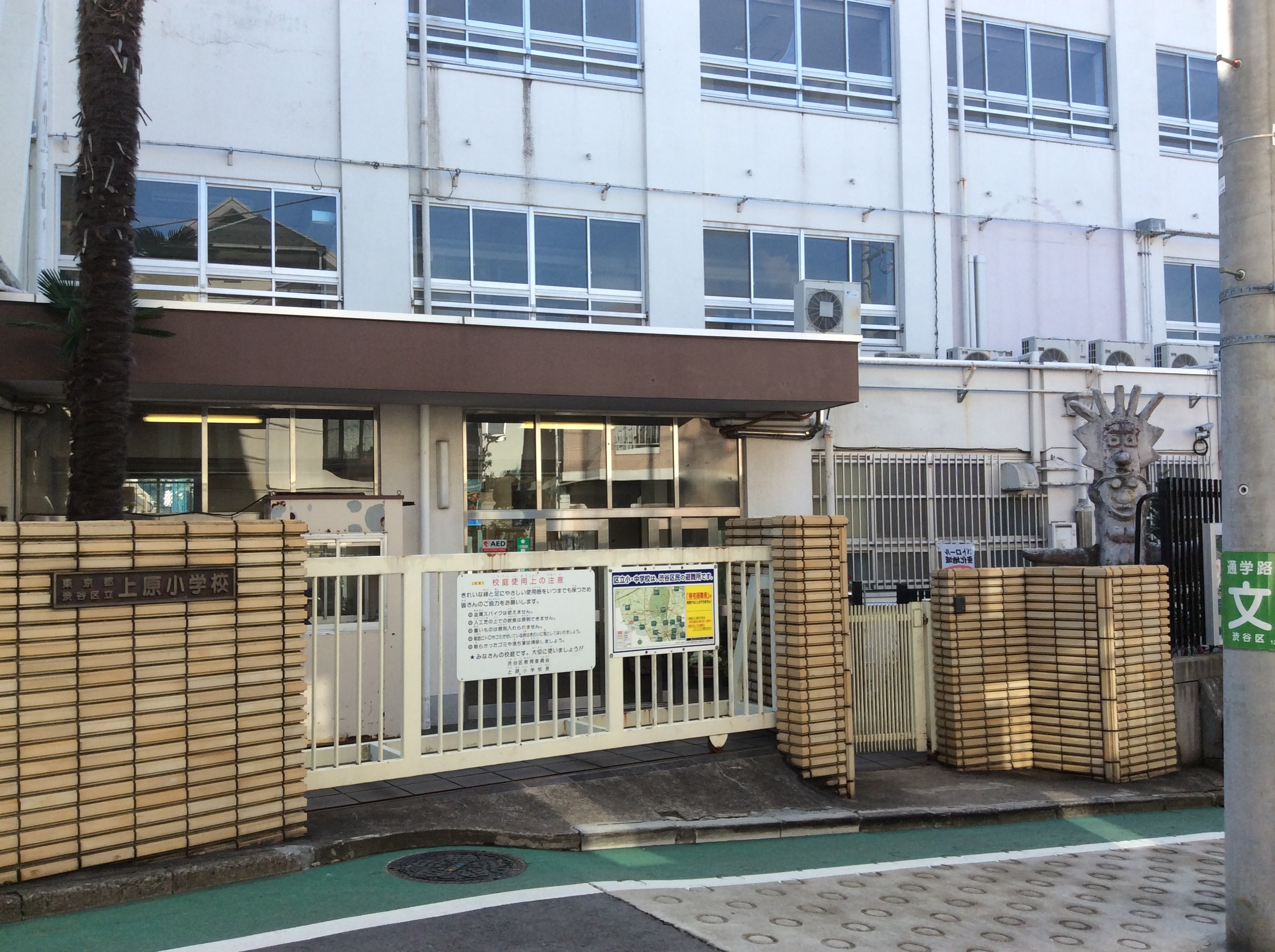
Uehara Elementary School (渋谷区立上原小学校)

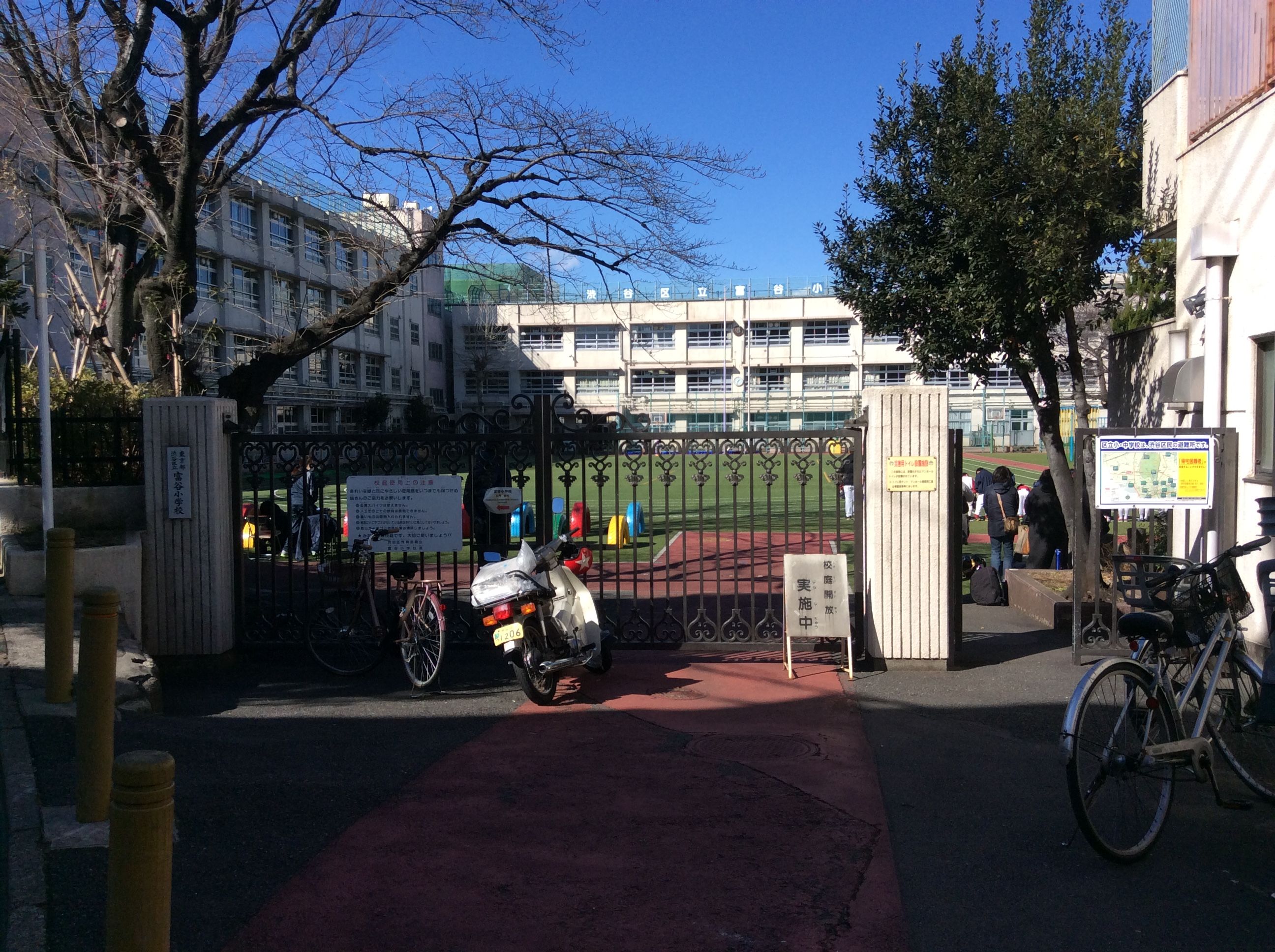
Tomigaya Elementary School (渋谷区立富谷小学校)
