= Hatsudai =

District in Shibuya, Tokyo, Japan

Hatsudai 初台
- Neighborhood in Shibuya
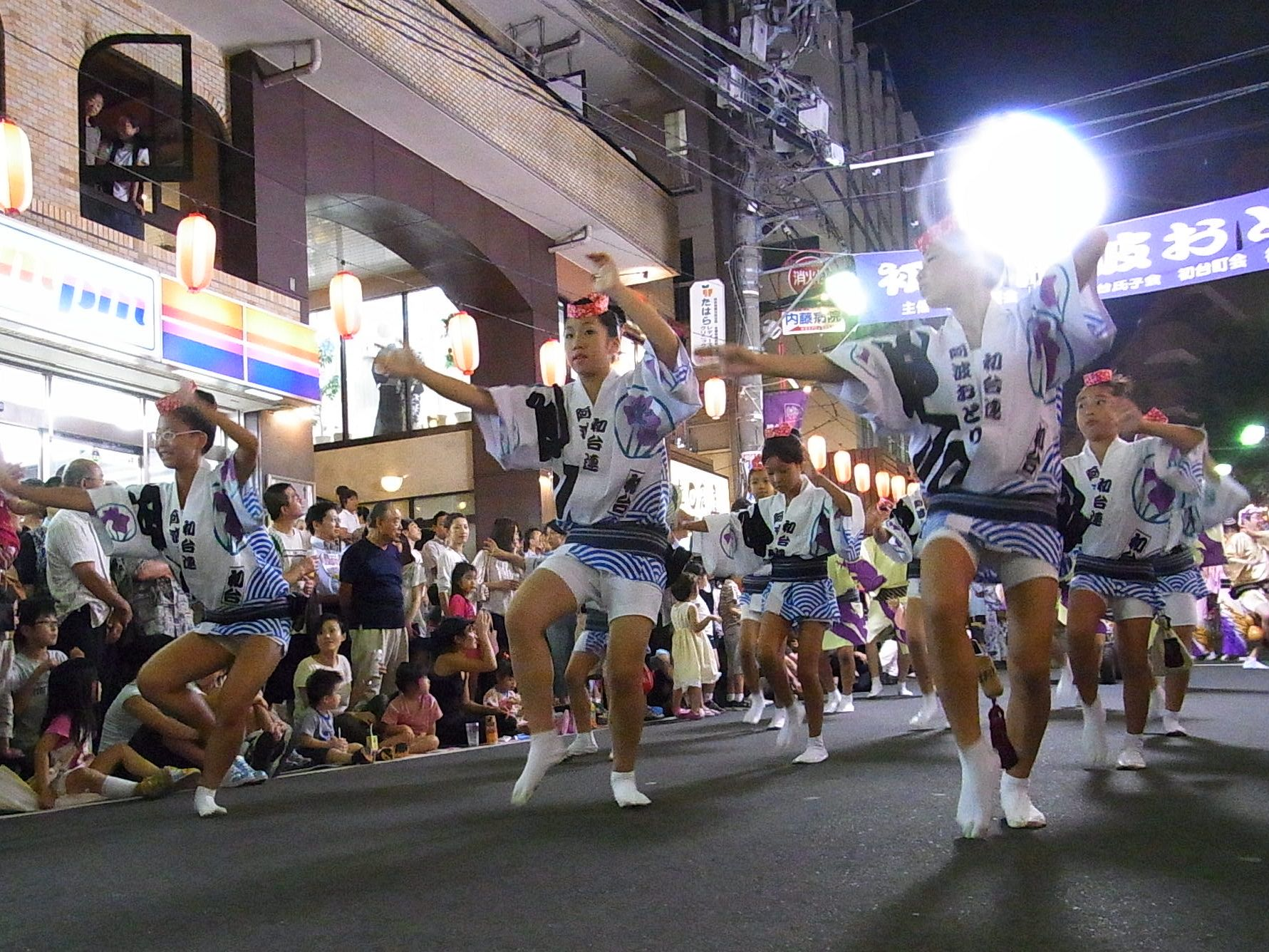
- Annual Awa Odori Festival
- Interactive map of Hatsudai
- Country: Japan
- Prefecture: Tokyo
- Special ward: Shibuya

Population (1 November 2020)
  - Total: 8,629
- Time zone: UTC+09:00
- ZIP code: 151-0061
- Telephone area code: 03

Hatsudai (初台) is a district of Shibuya, Tokyo, Japan.

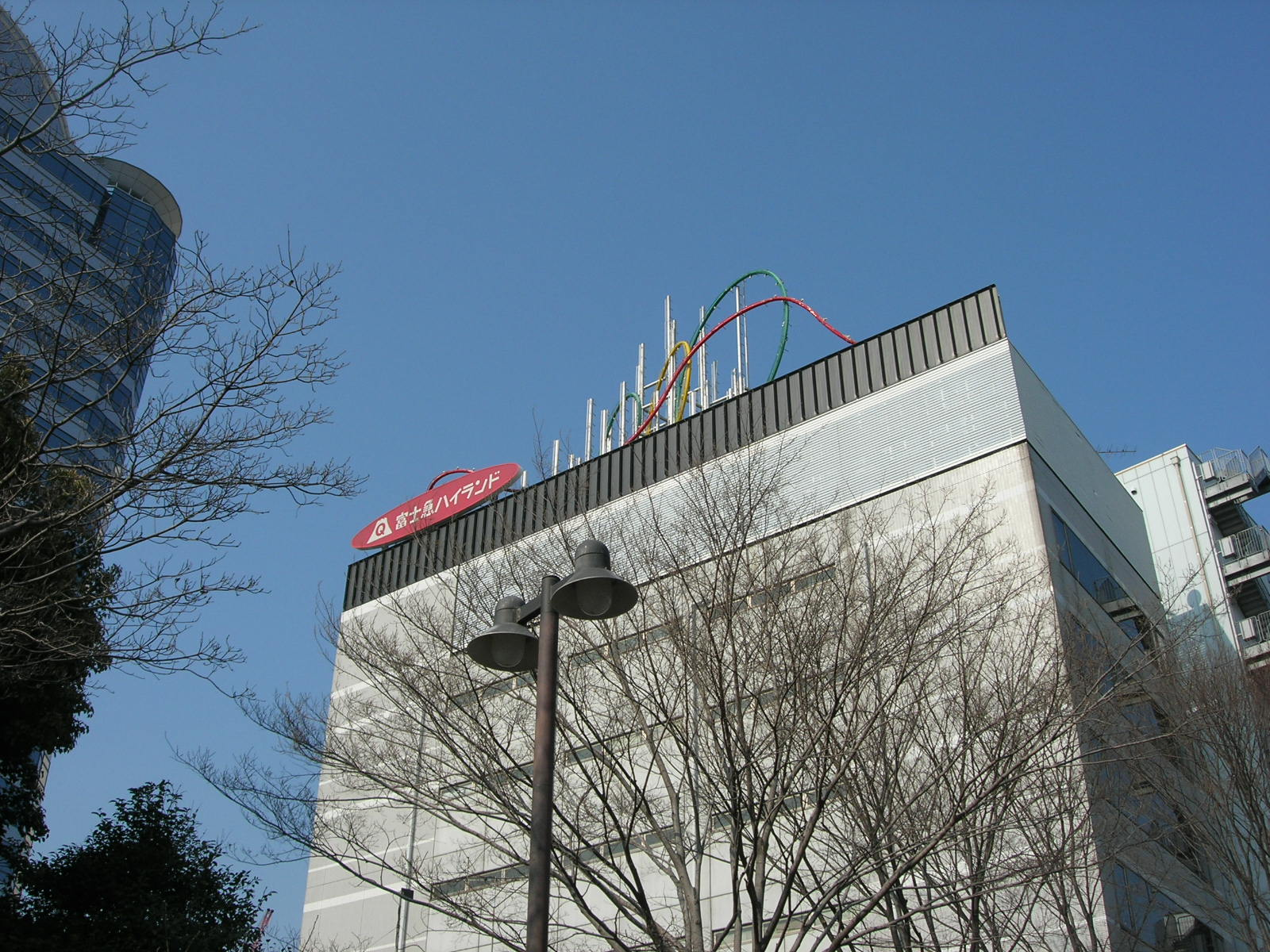
The Tokyo headquarters of Fuji Kyuko in Hatsudai.

As of October 2020, the population of this district is 8,629. The postal code for Hatsudai is 151-0061.

An Awa Odori festival is held here annually.

== Geography ==
Hatsudai borders Nishi-Shinjuku and Honmachi in the north, Yoyogi to the east, Nishihara to the south and southwest, and Motoyoyogichō to the west.

== Demography ==
Population of Hatsudai by Chōme (November 1 2020)
District	Number of Households	Total Population	Male	Female
Hatsudai 1-chōme	2,775	4,466	2,145	2,321
Hatsudai 2-chōme	2,278	4,163	2,008	2,155
Total	5,053	8,629	4,153	4,476

Population Trend of Hatsudai
Year	Total Population
2012	7,615
2013	7,714
2014	7,805
2015	7,950
2016	8,108
2017	8,330
2018	8,535
2019	8,540
2020 (November 1)	8,629

Population Trends of Hatsudai by Citizenship and Sex
Year	Total Population	Female Population	Male Population	Japanese Population	Non-Japanese Population
2015	7,950	4,127	3,823	7,726	224
2016	8,108	4,196	3,912	7,863	245
2017	8,330	4,329	4,001	8,060	270
2018	8,535	4,442	4,093	8,260	275
2019	8,540	4,447	4,093	8,284	256
2020 (November 1)	8,629	4,476	4,153	8,373	256

== Transportation ==
Hatsudai is served by Hatsudai Station, on the Keiō New Line.

== Education ==
Shibuya Board of Education operates public elementary and junior high schools.

All of Hatsudai (1 and 2-chome) is zoned to Hatashiro Elementary School (幡代小学校), and Yoyogi Junior High School (代々木中学校).

Schools in Hatsudai include:

- Hatashiro Elementary School (渋谷区立幡代小学校) (Hatsudai 1-32-12)
