= Ōyamachō =

District in Shibuya, Tokyo, Japan

Ōyamachō 大山町
- Neighborhood
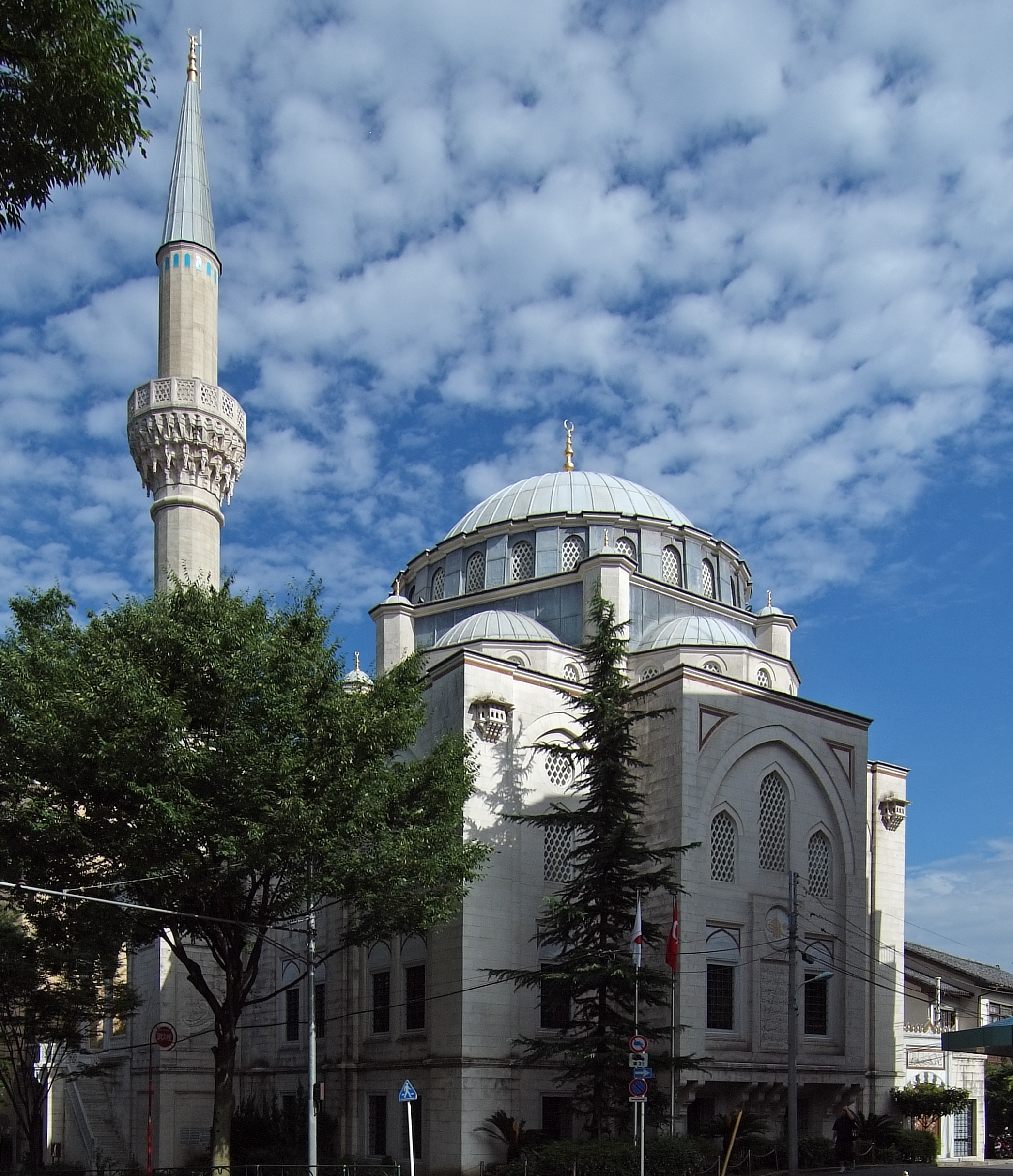
- Tokyo Camii
- Interactive map of Ōyamachō
- Country: Japan
- Prefecture: Tokyo
- Special ward: Shibuya

Population (1 October 2020)
  - Total: 3,376
- Time zone: UTC+09:00
- ZIP code: 151-0065
- Telephone area code: 03

Ōyamachō (大山町) is a district of Shibuya, Tokyo, Japan.

As of October 2020, the population of this district is 3,218. The postal code for Ōyamachō is 151-0065.

Tokyo Camii, the largest mosque in Japan, is located here.

== Education ==
Shibuya Board of Education operates public elementary and junior high schools.

Oyamacho 1-8 and 12-47 is zoned to Nishihara Elementary School (西原小学校) and Yoyogi Junior High School (代々木中学校). Oyamacho 9-11 is zoned to Uehara Elementary School (上原小学校) and Uehara Junior High School (上原中学校).
