= Postal codes in Japan =

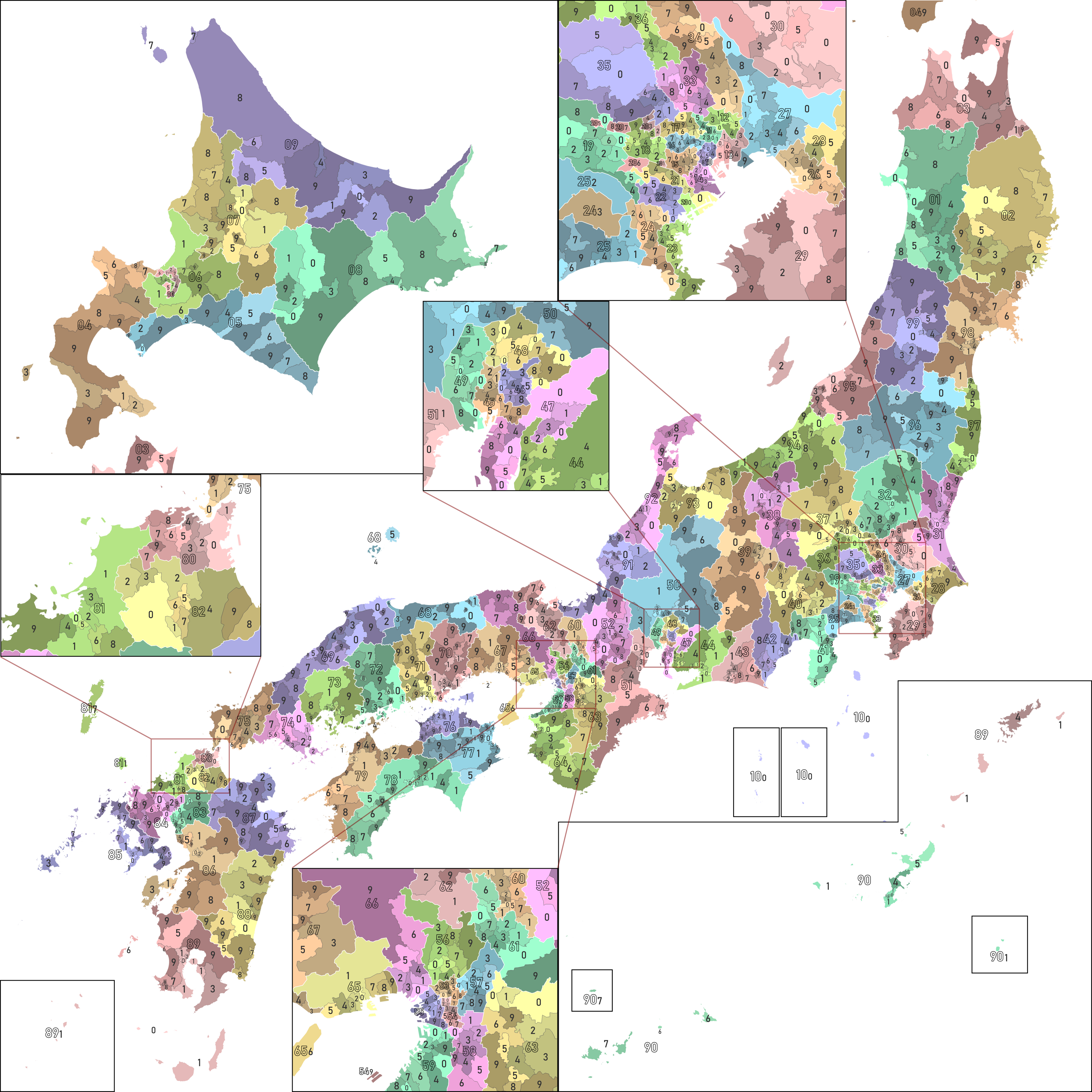
3-digit postcodes of Japan

Postal codes in Japan are 7-digit numeric codes using the format NNN-NNNN, where N is a digit. The first two digits refer to one of the 47 prefectures (for example, 40 for the Yamanashi Prefecture), the next digit for one of a set of adjacent cities in the prefecture (408 for Hokuto, Yamanashi), the next two for a neighborhood, and the last for a neighborhood or other subdivision (408-0301 to 408-0307 for the Mukawa-chō neighborhood in Hokuto).
