= Hatagaya, Shibuya =

District in Shibuya, Tokyo, Japan

Coordinates: 35.6781°N 139.6736°E

Hatagaya 幡ヶ谷
- Neighborhood in Shibuya
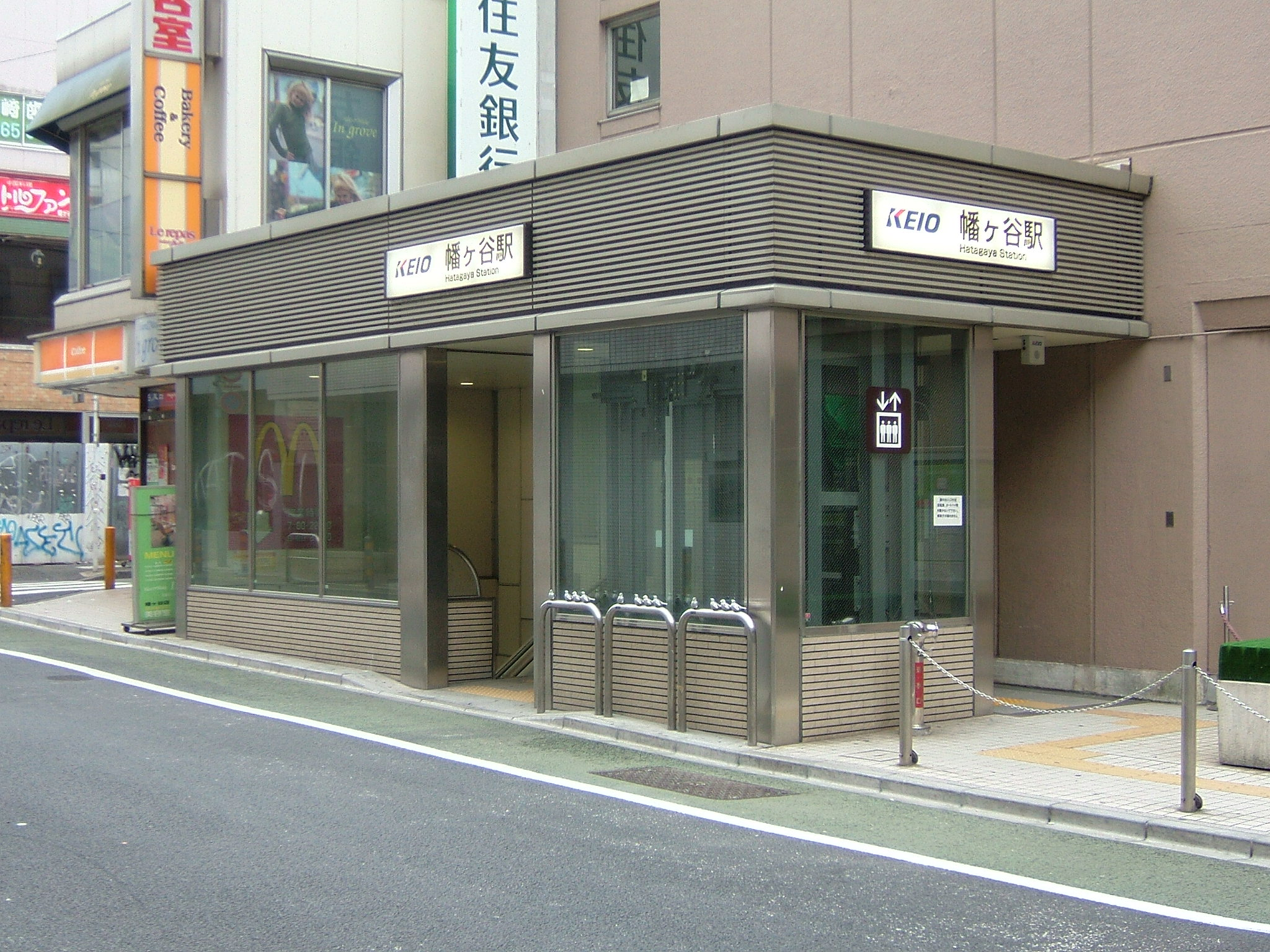
- Hatagaya Station
- Interactive map of Hatagaya
- Country: Japan
- Prefecture: Tokyo
- Special ward: Shibuya

Population (1 October 2020)
  - Total: 16,782
- Time zone: UTC+09:00
- ZIP code: 151-0072
- Telephone area code: 03

Hatagaya (幡ヶ谷) is an area within Shibuya, Tokyo, Japan.

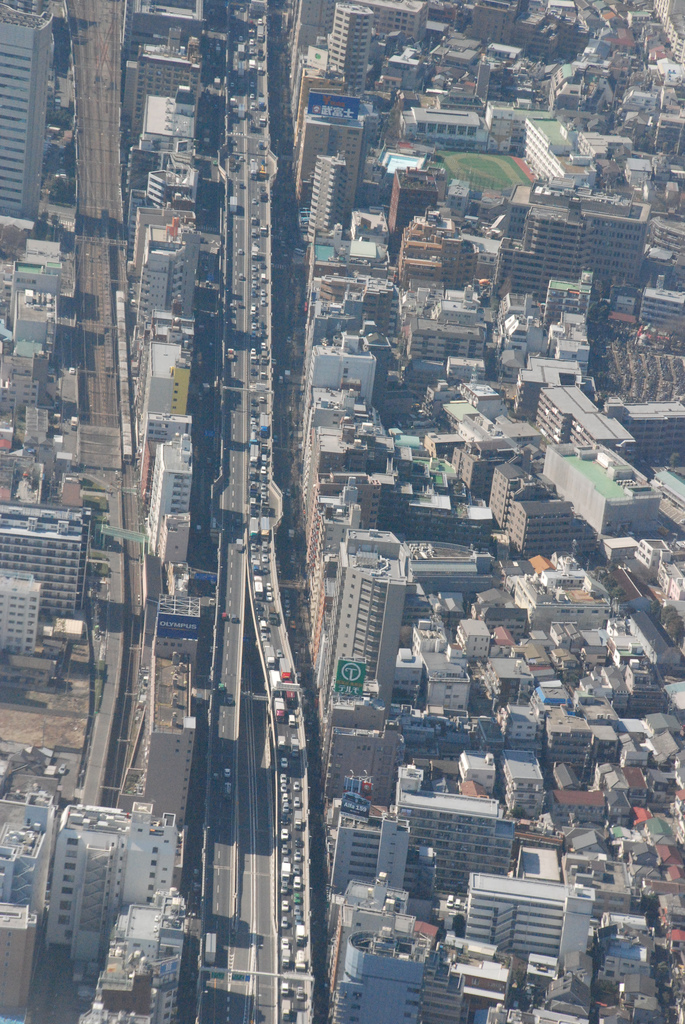
Route 4 and National Route 20; Hatagaya is in the foreground

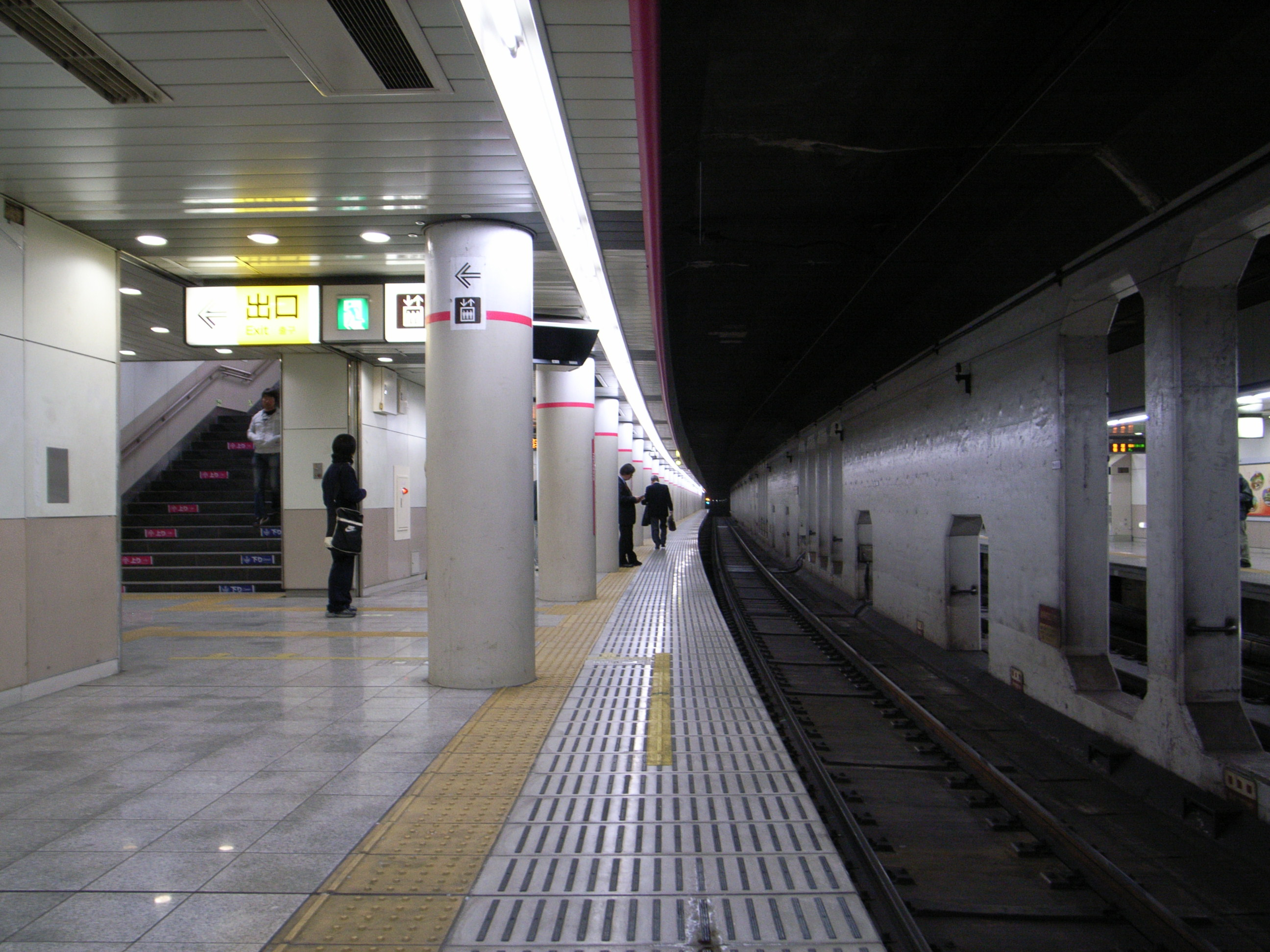
Hatagaya Station Platform No. 2

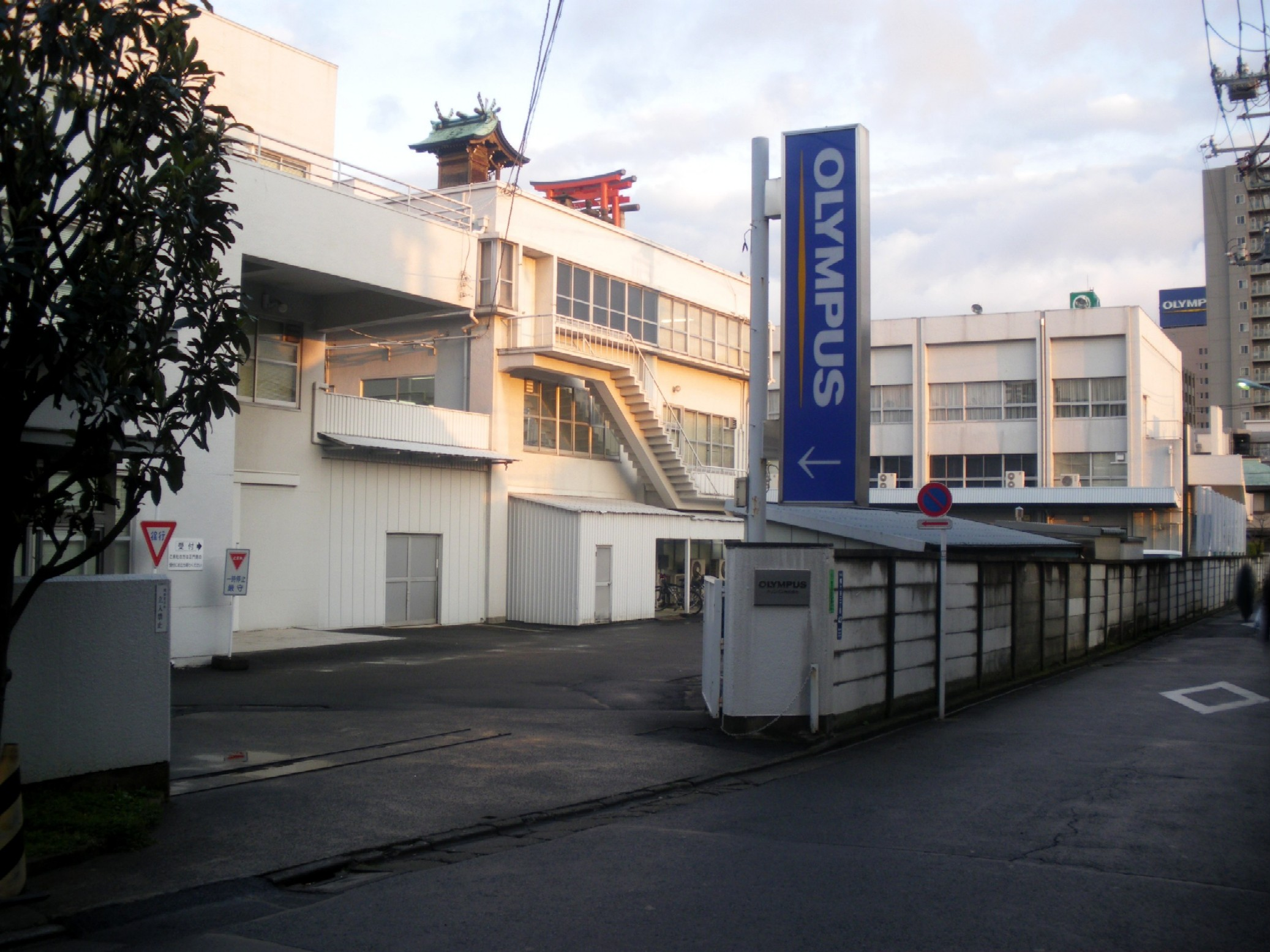
Olympus' old office; in the back is the green Terumo sign

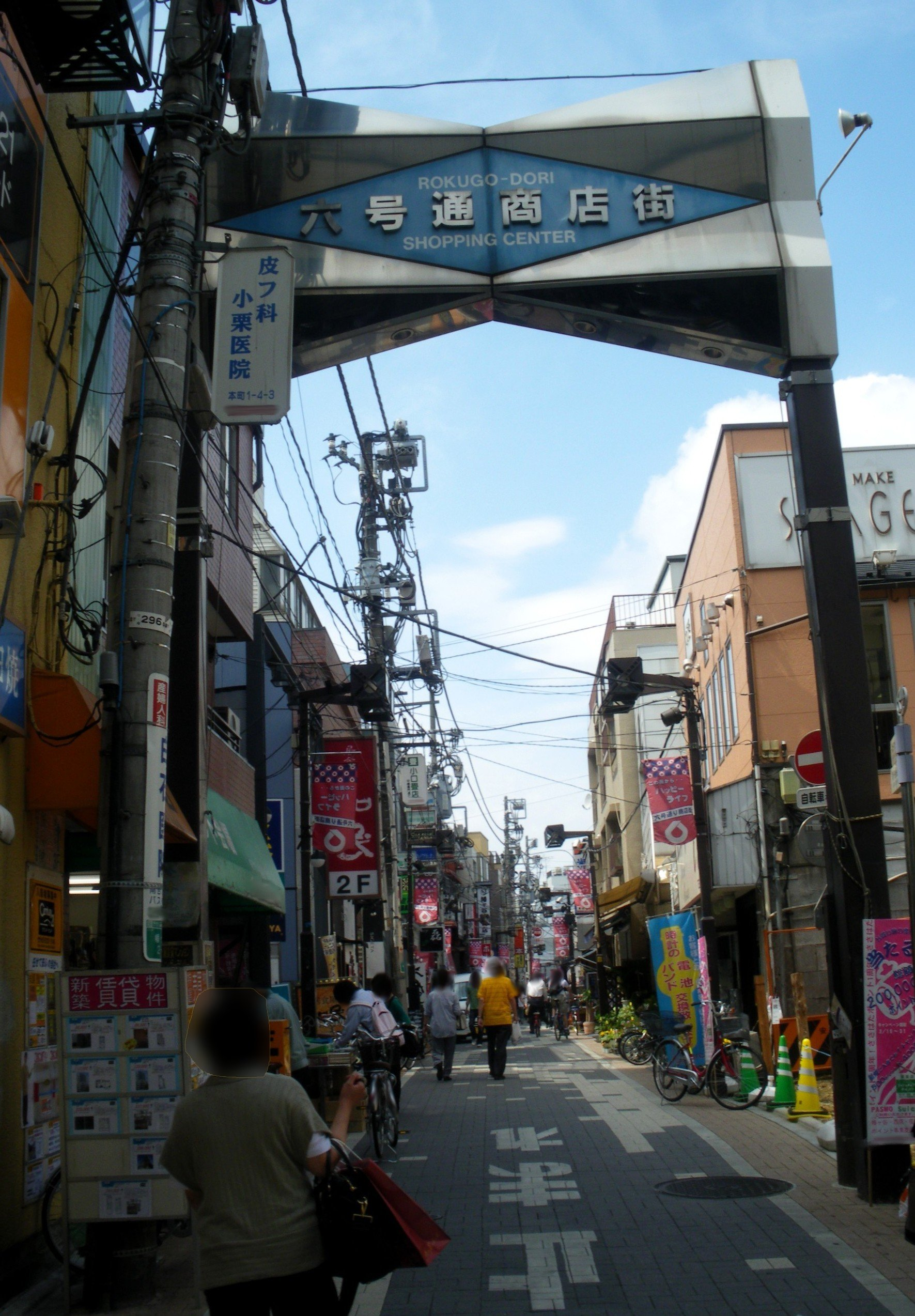
Rokugo Dori Shopping Center

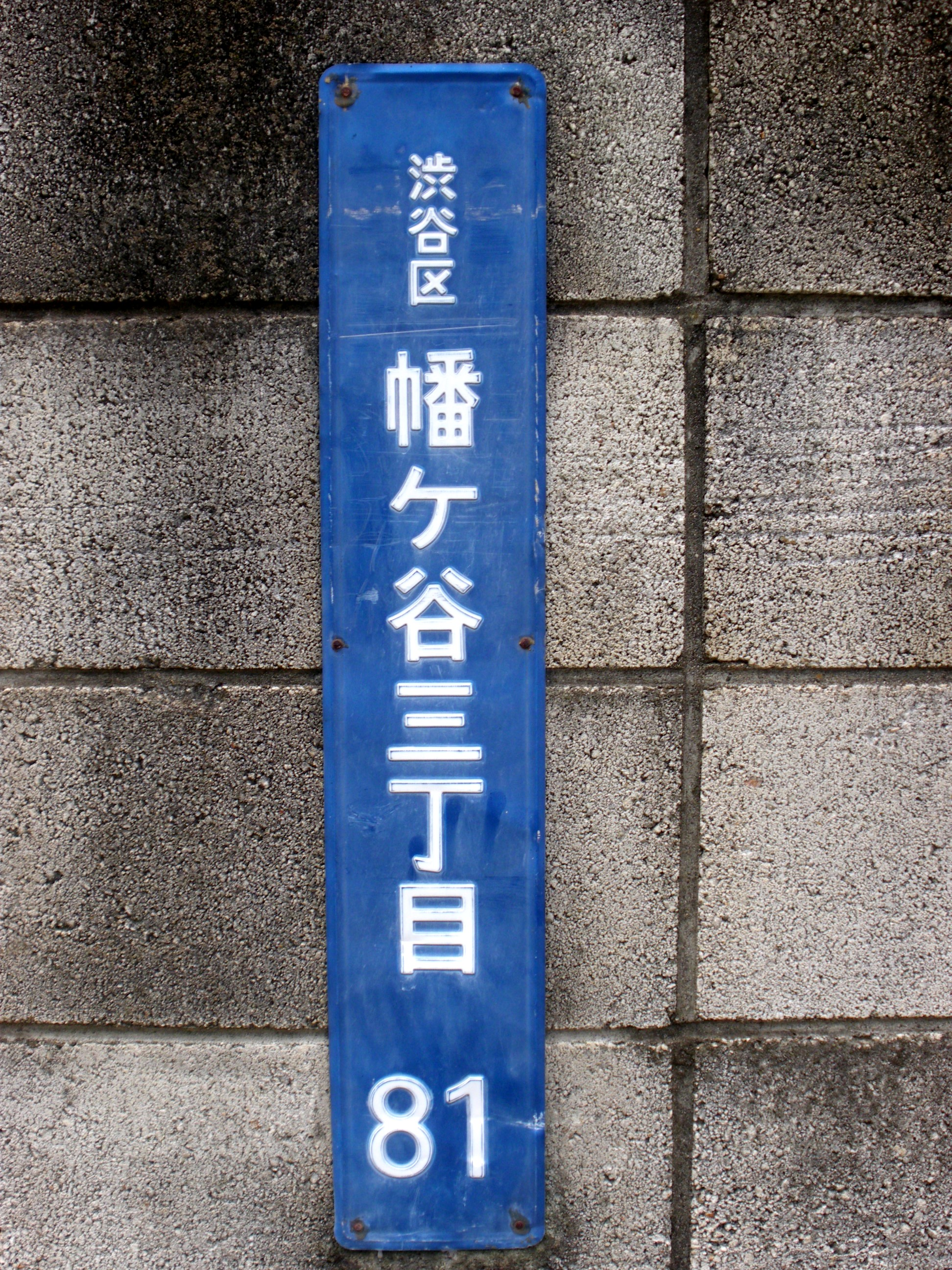
Hatagaya 3-81

== Origins ==
It is said the origin of the name Hatagaya, comes from the year 1082, when Minamoto no Yoshiie was returning to his home and stopped in the area and washed a white flag, put it up on a pole and hosted a banquet. (Hatagaya translates to "flag valley.")

== Transportation ==
Hatagaya is served by Hatagaya Station on the Keio New Line. It is also served by bus, linking Shinjuku, Nakano, Shibuya, Asagaya and Yoyogi.

== Economy ==
Companies including Olympus and Terumo have offices here. The main shopping district in Hatagaya is Rokugo Dori (六号通り), a street along which there are many shops, restaurants and bars.

== Demography ==
Population of Hatagaya by Chōme (October 1 2020)
District	Number of Households	Total Population	Male	Female
Hatagaya 1-chōme	2,374	3,609	1,648	1,961
Hatagaya 2-chōme	4,081	6,357	2,994	3,363
Hatagaya 3-chōme	3,981	6,847	3,368	3,479
Total	10,436	16,813	8,010	8,803

Population Trend of Hatagaya
Year	Total Population
2012	15,335
2013	15,610
2014	15,588
2015	15,875
2016	16,029
2017	16,168
2018	16,479
2019	16,647
2020 (October 1)	16,813

Population Trends of Hatagaya by Citizenship and Sex
Year	Total Population	Female Population	Male Population	Japanese Population	Non-Japanese Population
2015	15,875	8,289	7,586	15,469	406
2016	16,029	8,328	7,701	15,573	456
2017	16,168	8,423	7,745	15,707	461
2018	16,479	8,591	7,888	15,999	480
2019	16,647	8,717	7,930	16,166	481
2020 (October 1)	16,813	8,803	8,010	16,361	452

== Places of interest ==
=== Cultural ===
==== Temples ====
- Seiganji (清岸寺) (Hatagaya 2-36-1)

=== Schools ===
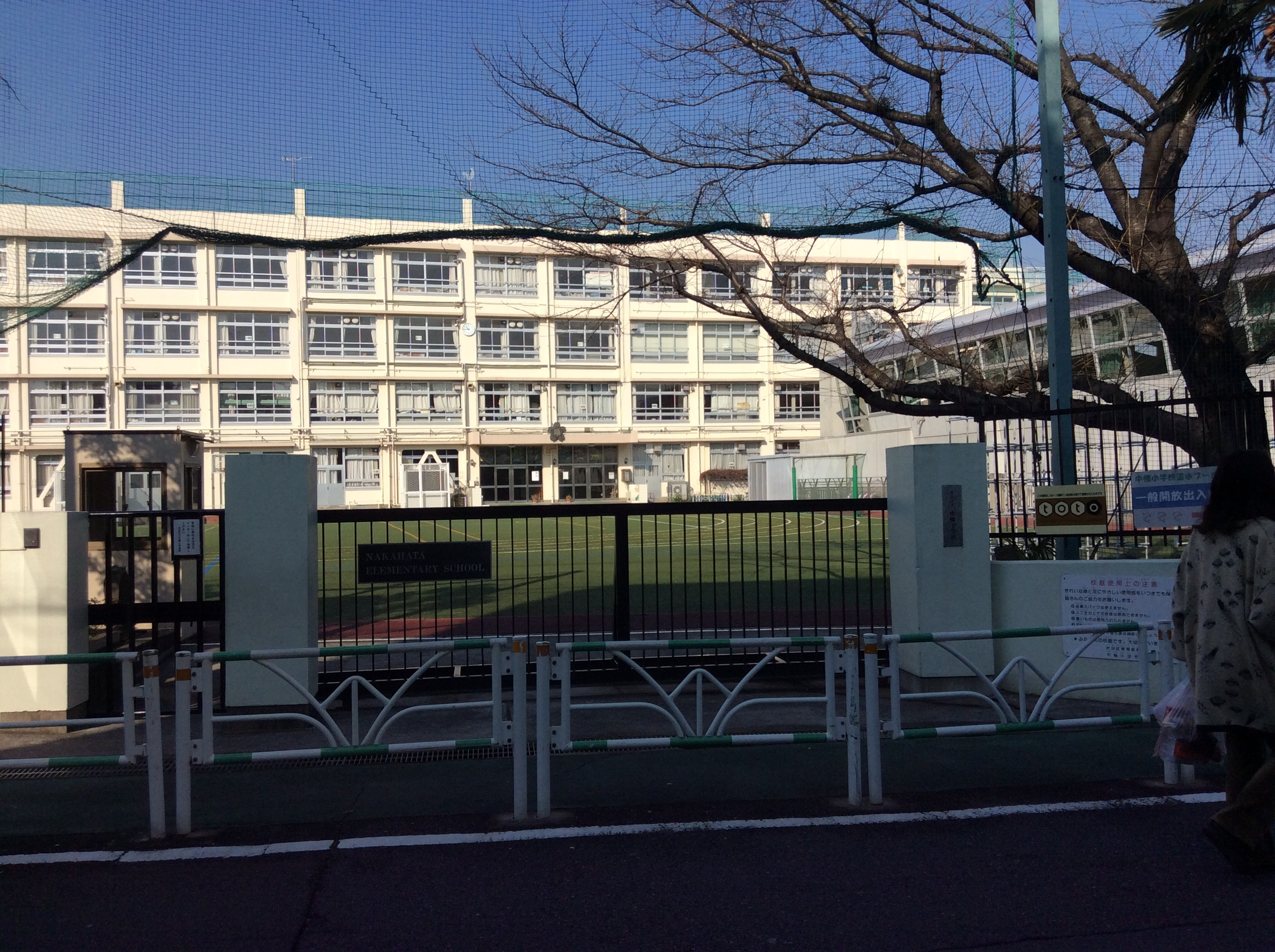
Nakahata Elementary School (渋谷区立中幡小学校)

Shibuya Board of Education operates public elementary and junior high schools.

Hatagaya 2-chome 35, 38, 43, 45, 49, and 5-56 ban, and Hatagaya 3-chome 1-36 and 38-81 ban are zoned to Nakahata Elementary School (中幡小学校). Hatagaya 1-chome 1-9 and 13-34-ban and 2-chome 1-19, 39-42, 44, 46-48, and 50-ban are zoned to Nishihara Elementary School (西原小学校). Hatagaya 1-chome 10-12 ban, 2-chome 20-34, 36, and 37-ban, and 3-chome 37-ban are zoned to Sasazuka Elementary School (笹塚小学校).

Hatagaya 3-chome, 1-chome 10-12 ban, and 2-chome 20-38, 43, 45, 49, and 51-56 ban are zoned to Sasazuka Junior High School (笹塚中学校). Hatagaya 1-chome 1-9 and 13-34-ban and 2-chome 1-19, 39-42, 44, 46-48, and 50-ban are zoned to Yoyogi Junior High School (代々木中学校).

Schools within Hatagaya:

- Nakahata Elementary School (渋谷区立中幡小学校) (Hatagaya 3-49-1)

=== Other ===
- Tokyo Fire Department Fire Technology and Safety Laboratory (東京消防庁消防科学研究所) (Hatagaya 1-13-20)
