= Hachiyamachō =

District in Shibuya, Tokyo, Japan

Hachiyamachō 鉢山町
- Neighborhood in Shibuya
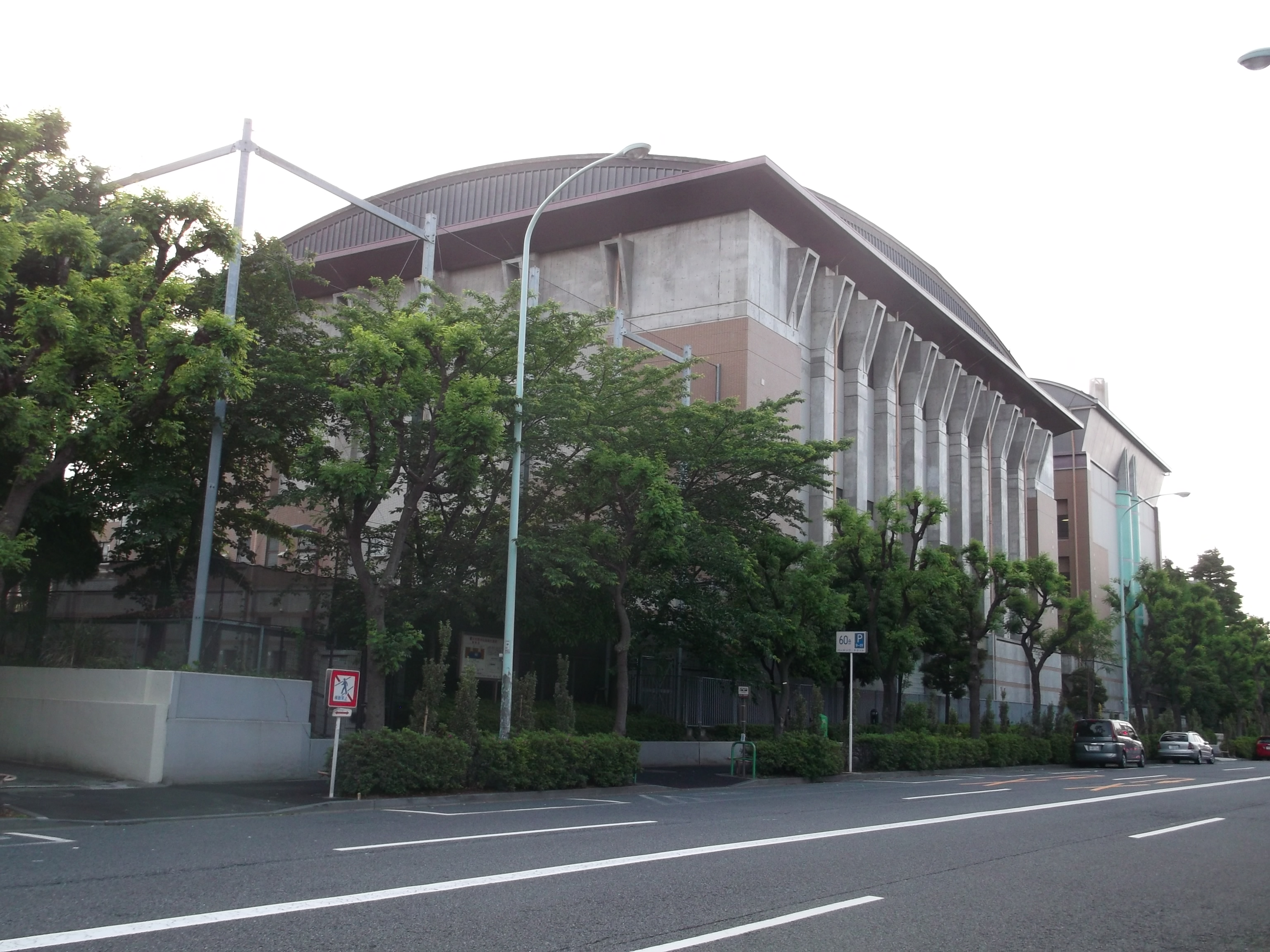
- Interactive map of Hachiyamachō
- Country: Japan
- Prefecture: Tokyo
- Special ward: Shibuya

Population (1 October 2020)
  - Total: 1,197
- Time zone: UTC+09:00
- ZIP code: 150-0035
- Telephone area code: 03

Hachiyamachō (鉢山町) is a district of Shibuya, Tokyo, Japan.

As of October 2020, the population of this district is 1,197. The postal code for Hachiyamachō is 150–0035.

== Geography ==
Hachiyamachō borders Nanpeidaichō in the north, Uguisudanichō to the east, Sarugakuchō to the south, and Aobadai to the west.

== Places of interest ==
=== Embassies ===
- Embassy of Guinea (Hachiyamachō 12–9)
- Embassy of Uganda (Hachiyamachō 9-23)

=== Schools ===
High schools from the Tokyo Metropolitan Board of Education:

- Tokyo Metropolitan First Commercial High School (東京都立第一商業高等学校) (Hachiyamachō 8–1)

Shibuya Board of Education operates public elementary and junior high schools.

All of Hachiyamachō is zoned to Sarugaku Elementary School (猿楽小学校), and Hachiyama Junior High School (鉢山中学校).
