= Nakameguro =

Neighborhood in Meguro-ku, Tokyo, Japan

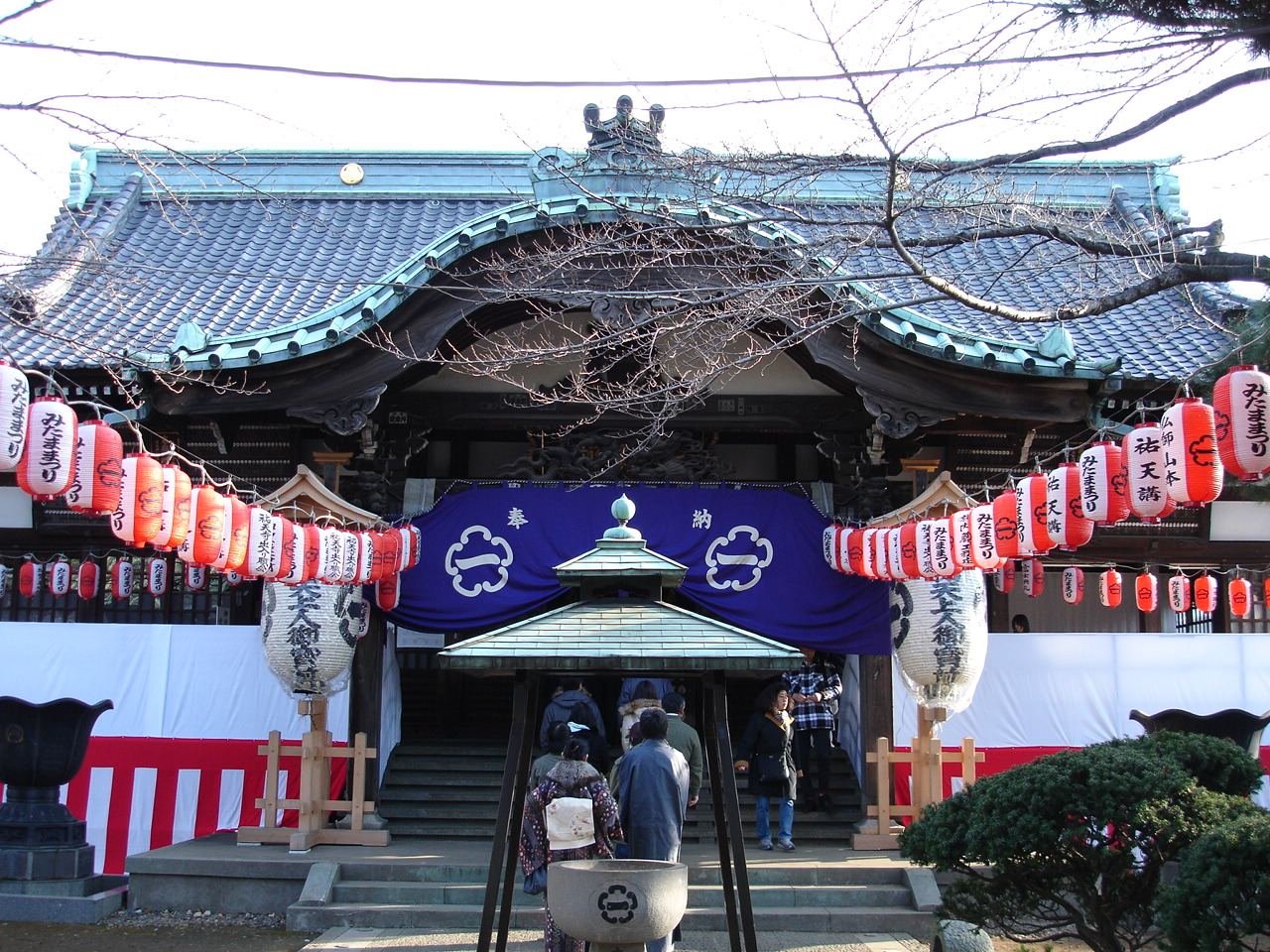
Yūtenji, 2007

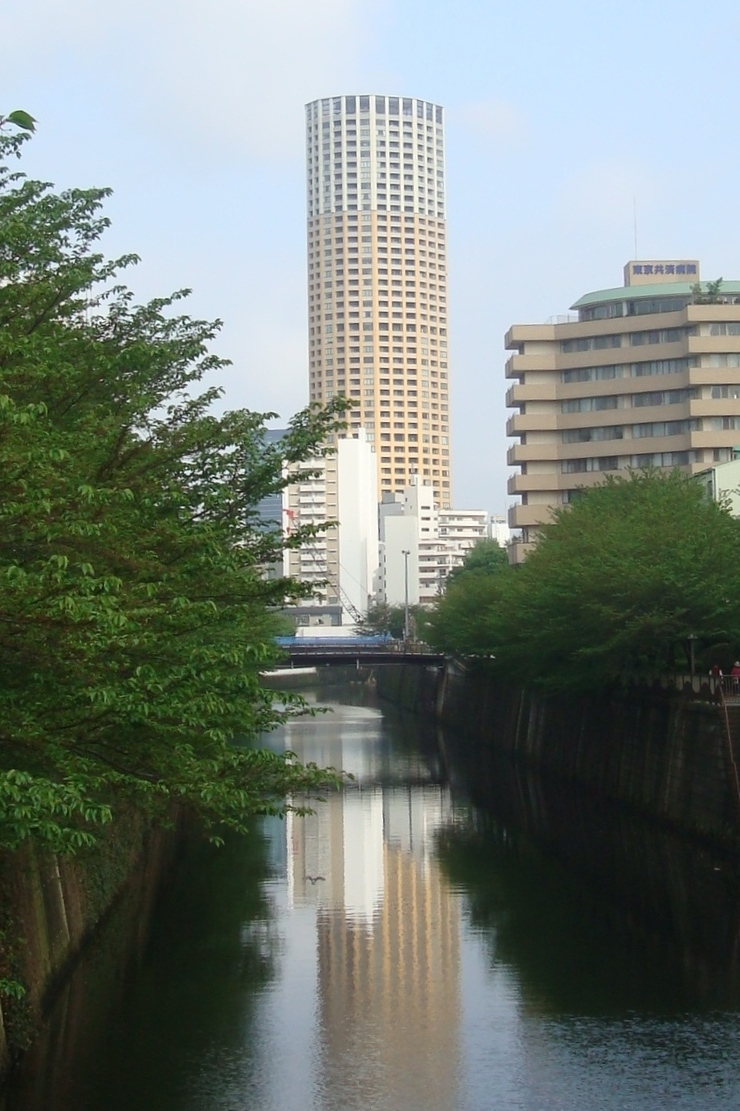
Meguro river and Atlas Tower

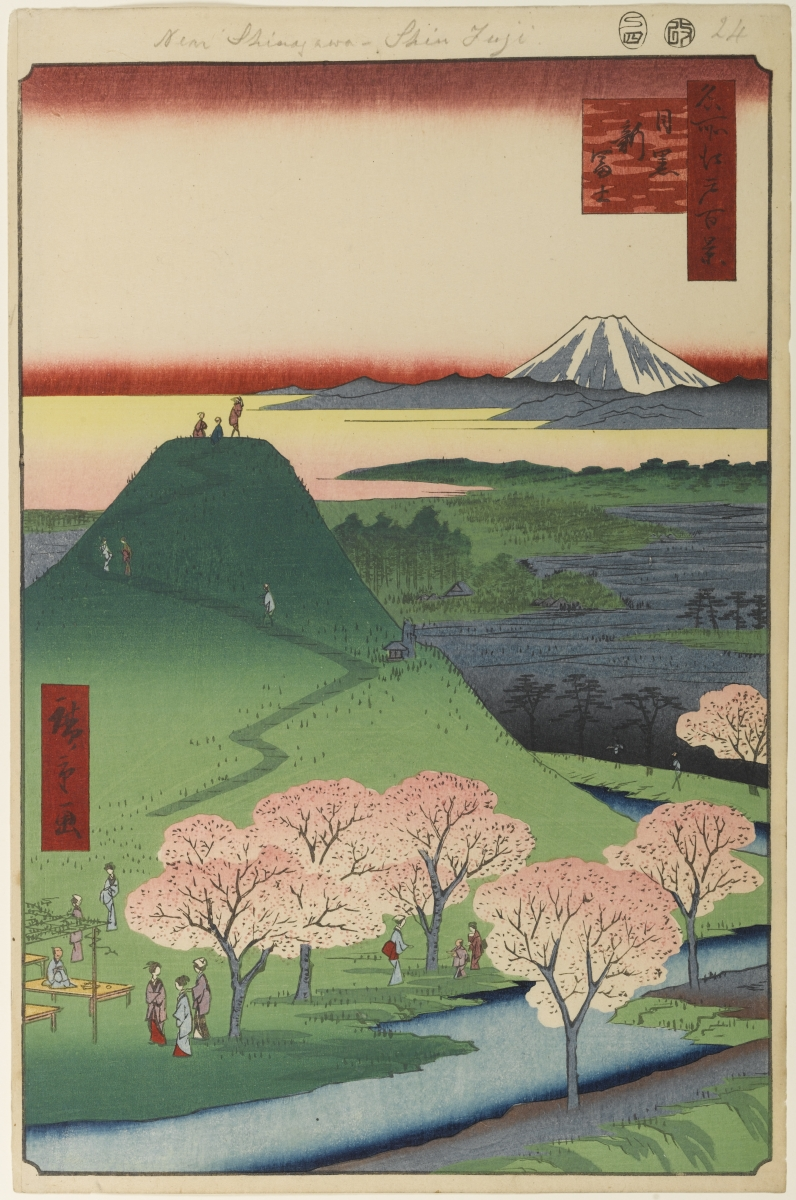
Hiroshige artwork

Nakameguro (中目黒; pronounced [nakameꜜɡɯɾo]) is a residential district of Meguro, Tokyo. It is popular for its boutiques and cafes, and the area near the Meguro River is a popular hanami (cherry blossom viewing) destination in mid-spring. It lends its name to Nakameguro Station, which serves the Tokyo Metro Hibiya Line and Tokyu Tōyoko Line.

Nakameguro is sometimes abbreviated as Nakame (なかめ; pronounced [nakame]).

== Location ==
The district is situated along Yamate Dōri (山手通り) and on the southern region of Komazawa Dōri (駒沢通り). Since Nakameguro Station is located not in this district but in northern Kamimeguro, the place name Nakameguro is often used for the larger region encompassing Nakameguro and Kamimeguro as well as a small portion of Aobadai and Higashiyama.

== Temples and shrines ==
Yūtenji, built in 1718, is a temple of the Pure Land Buddhism located on the easternmost part of Nakameguro; Yūtenji is also the name of a district adjacent to Nakameguro in Meguro which is not where the temple is located.

== Education ==
Meguro City Board of Education operates public elementary and junior high schools.

Nakameguro 1-3 chōme and parts of 4-5 chōme are zoned to Nakameguro Elementary School (中目黒小学校). Parts of 5-chōme are zoned to Aburamen Elementary School (油面小学校), while other parts are zoned to Kamimeguro Elementary School (上目黒小学校). Parts of 4-chōme are zoned to Dendo Elementary School (田道小学校). The majority of Nakameguro is zoned to Meguro Central Junior High School (目黒中央中学校). However the portion zoned to Dendo Elementary instead feeds into Otori Junior High School (大鳥中学校).
