= The Legend of Legacy =

2015 video game

- Cover art for North American 3DS release
- Developer: Cattle Call
- Publishers: JP: FuRyu; NA: Atlus USA; PAL: NIS America
- Director: Masataka Matsuura
- Producers: Masato Yoshida; Nariaki Yamada
- Designer: Kyoji Koizumi
- Artists: Ryo Hirao; Masayo Asano; Tomomi Kobayashi
- Writer: Masato Kato
- Composer: Masashi Hamauzu
- Engine: Unity (HD Remastered)
- Platforms: Nintendo 3DS, Nintendo Switch, PlayStation 4, PlayStation 5, Windows
- Release: JP: January 22, 2015; NA: October 13, 2015; EU: February 5, 2016; AU: February 12, 2016; HD Remastered: JP: February 1, 2024; WW: March 22, 2024
- Genre: Role-playing
- Mode: Single-player

The Legend of Legacy (Note: (Japanese: レジェンド オブ レガシー)) is a turn-based role-playing video game for the Nintendo 3DS handheld video game console, developed by Cattle Call. The game was first published for Japan by FuRyu in January 2015, then localized by Atlus USA to be published by Atlus USA for North America in October and by NIS America for Europe and Australia in February 2016. A remaster was released in 2024 for the Nintendo Switch, PlayStation 4, PlayStation 5, and Windows. The story takes place on the legendary lost continent of Avalon, where eight adventurers explore and fight to uncover its mysteries.

The production of The Legend of Legacy began in 2013; multiple industry and genre veterans were joined the development staff, including director Masataka Matsuura, designer Kyoji Koizumi, promotional artist Tomomi Kobayashi, writer Masato Kato, and composer Masashi Hamauzu. The game was chosen for localization by Atlus USA due to its positive impression on staff and their previous relationship with FuRyu. Upon release, the game received mixed reviews. The core developers used ideas from the concept stages of The Legend of Legacy to develop The Alliance Alive.

== Gameplay ==
A battle in The Legend of Legacy, showing the party fighting an enemy group. The battle is shown on the upper screen, while the party's command menu is shown below.

The Legend of Legacy is a role-playing video game in which players take control of seven different characters as they explore the island of Avalon; each character has different starting statistics (stats). While each scenario starts out with three pre-set characters, the rest of the cast can be recruited, but will only gain stat increases if they are in the party. The chosen protagonist operates from the town of Initium on Avalon, exploring areas of Avalon after being provided with a blank map. Walking around areas automatically generates a map, displayed on the bottom screen of the Nintendo 3DS. During exploration, the party can also explore dungeons, and find chest both above ground and in dungeons containing items and currency. Once each region is explored, the mission turned in for currency and replaced with a new blank map and new area to explore. It also enables monster numbers to be reduced, and aids in dungeon exploration. Completing maps or buying them within Initium progresses the game's narrative. The player can save both at specific locations and create a quick save at any point during the campaign.

Initium acts as a hub for the party, where they can buy and sell equipment and maps, and talk with non-playable characters to learn story and gameplay information. The player can use ships to trade from Initium in a mechanic tied to the 3DS' StreetPass functionality. Players send out ships with cargo to trade with other cities, bringing currency and items. Larger ship types take longer to return from trips, but have a higher chance of bringing rare items. Using StreetPass allows players to fill ships sooner and see them return earlier. Completing the game allows players access to a New Game Plus option, carrying over character statistics and money, while making advanced weapons available for purchase from the start.

During exploration, enemies appear as sprites within the environment, which can be avoided or engaged and will pursue if they see the party. Battles use a turn-based battle system within a themed arena, with both player and enemy parties being arranged on a grid in arrangements called "Formations". Each formation has a selection of "Stances", which are divided into attack, defense and "support" abilities such as healing. Player formations are created between battles, with the party able to change formation once during their turn. The party has access to eight weapon types, which can be freely assigned to each character and impact their statistics and battle abilities; Fists (melee combat) Long and Short swords, Axes, Spears, Staves, Bows and Shields. Each party member can partner with Elemental spirits aligned to Fire, Air, Water and Shadow once they find special relics during exploration. Once a partnership is established, the party member can use "Charms", powerful magical spells unique to each element which can unleash powerful attacks or protect the party from taking damage. Charms grow stronger the more they are used. Winning a battle rewards the party with statistic increases, currency and items.

Contrary to the majority of role-playing games, character stat increases do not rely on an experience point system, instead depending on usage during battle. Winning a battle awards the party with items and currency, but also randomized stat increases, raising a character's health or attack power. Each weapon has specific abilities dubbed "Arts"; using an Art often enough results in it either upgrading to a more powerful form or the party member learning a new skill for that weapon in a process dubbed "Awakening". Charms also grow stronger the more they are used, and characters grown more proficient in their Formation roles the more they are used in a particular formation.

== Synopsis ==
=== Setting and characters ===
The Legend of Legacy takes place entirely on the island of Avalon, which was discovered ten years before the game's opening and identified with a legendary lost continent whose inhabitants walked alongside gods; the island, while now mostly wild and dominated by monsters, housed ruins crafted with the assistance of natural spirits dubbed "Elementals", and ancient stones which detail the island's past when activated. A legendary artifact of Avalon is the Star Graal, which is said to grant "eternity" to its bearer, and prompts dozens of adventurers to travel Avalon in search of it. The only active town on Avalon is Initium, founded by the King of Adventurers, a man who discovered the island ten years before.

Each of the seven playable characters come to Avalon with different objectives. Meurs is the last Elementalist, a person with the power to communicate with Elementals. Bianca is an amnesiac who wakes up on Avalon only remembering her name. Liber is lured to Avalon with the promise of adventure and treasure. Garnet is a Templar in service to the Holy Order. Eloise is a seductive alchemist pursuing the secret of eternal life. Owen is a legendary mercenary who will take any job if the price is right. Filmia, the only native of Avalon, is a frog prince from a lost kingdom. Each of the seven protagonists are drawn to Avalon for different reasons: Meurs is summoned by the distressed calls of Elementals; Bianca goes on a quest to discover her identity, Liber is in search of the Star Graal as treasure; Eloise searches for the Star Graal to discover the secret of immortality; both Garnet and Owen are sent by the Holy Order to investigate Avalon due to its rumors of living gods and their consequent heretical status; and Filmia resolves to rebuild his kingdom.

=== Plot ===
Each of the seven protagonists comes to Avalon, making their base in the town of Initium. At the request of the King of Adventurers, the seven begin mapping the uncharted regions of Avalon. As they explore, they find magical stones called Singing Shards scattered across the world that reveal the story of Avalon. The ancient native kingdom was once prosperous through the efforts of Elementalists, sorcerers who created and communed with Elementals, harnessing their power and consequently growing overly dependent upon them. A civil war sparked between its reigning queen and her power-hungry successor Amelius. Emerging victorious, Amelius created an artifact called the Star Graal, granting immortality to himself and his followers including General Cherubim, the only military figurehead to betray Avalon's former ruler. The Star Graal imprisoned the Elementals, created a dark "Shadow" element which drove Amelius insane, cursed those it had made immortal, and caused both Avalon's initial disappearance and the vanishing of stars from the night sky. It was the Elementals' painful enslavement to the Star Graal that prompted them to call for Meurs.

Within each part of Avalon, the group discovers ancient temples which unlock the way to the City of the Unseen, Amelius' capital. During their adventure, Filmia rediscovers remnants of his people, and Bianca learns that she was crafted by Amelius as a servant. Exploring the City of the Unseen and fighting its enthralled inhabitants, the group then fight first Cherubim and then Amelius—he is defeated after merging with the Star Graal in a desperate attempt to defeat them. The destruction of the Star Graal leads to the deaths of Amelius's followers and the return of starlight, allowing nighttime navigation at sea and opening the way for Initium to become a major port. All the main characters aside from Filmia choose to leave Avalon behind. Each character has their own ending: Meurs continues his wanderings satisfied that the Elementals have been freed; Bianca decides to forge her own life free from her origins; Liber briefly settles down before setting out on another adventure; Garment decides to leave the Church to explore the wider world; Eloise—revealed to be actually called Lydia, sister to the real Eloise—decides to return to her sister; Filmia establishes his kingdom on Avalon and is hailed as a new god; and Owen is hired by the Church to hunt Filmia.

== Development ==
The Legend of Legacy was principally developed by Cattle Call, with game design by Grezzo and general supervision by Atlus. The staff included multiple industry veterans, many of whom had worked at Square on the Final Fantasy and SaGa series. From the SaGa series were designer Kyoji Koizumi, and promotional illustrator Tomomi Kobayashi. From the Final Fantasy series were art director Masayo Asano, character designer Ryo Hirao, and monster designer Yuichiro Kojima. Ryoji Shimogama, whose previous credits included the Resident Evil series and Parasite Eve 2, worked on monster designs with Kojima. The music was composed by Masashi Hamauzu, who had worked on both Unlimited Saga and Final Fantasy XIII. The script was written by Masato Kato, who had written the scripts for Chrono Trigger and its sequel Chrono Cross. The game was directed by Masataka Matsuura, who had previously worked on Nine Hours, Nine Persons, Nine Doors.

The concept of The Legend of Legacy was being created by Matsuura before he joined FuRyu, and became a reaction to the proliferation of casual mobile games in Japan. He was intent on creating an RPG reminiscent of the genre's golden age, using the RPGs of Square such as Final Fantasy and SaGa as his inspiration. While FuRyu's other major titles in development at the time—Exstetra and Lost Dimension—were aimed at younger audiences, Matsuura was intended for those who had played golden age RPGs. Due to his particular liking for the SaGa series, Matsuura wanted to create a game which emulated its unique style. Due to his relative lack of experience and his ambitions for the project, he asked both Koizumi and Kobayashi to be involved in the production. He later stated that his initial game design was almost entirely rewritten by Koizumi, which gave him confidence that they shared a passion for the project which would see it to completion. The development team was dubbed "Project Legacy". The game was completed in a relatively short time, with Matsuura saying that the team "worked themselves to the bone" to accomplish this.

Matsuura created the idea of three men, three women and one non-human in the cast. Kato expanded the scenario based on this premise, notably creating the story surrounding Filmia. Due to the game's target demographic, all the protagonists were adults, and due to the demands of the story did not specifically form a party or strong relationships. The game's title, written in English rather than Japanese to promote an air of mystery, was intended to show the game's central narrative theme and its commercial purpose of showing the legacy of golden age RPGs. The continent of Avalon was built up from the earliest piece of concept art, which encapsulated the island's ancient civilization, current condition and the game's artistic direction. The "Cartograph" mapping system was created by Koizumi to make exploring entertaining, but Matsuura added explanatory elements as the original version was proving difficult to understand. The game's environments, which has the environment pop into view as the character explores, was meant to emulate pop-up artwork from picture books, which fitted well with the stereoscopic 3D function of the Nintendo 3DS. The battle system concepts of interchangeable weapon types, the Awakening mechanic and positioning were created by Koizumi, the latter so that players would not grow tired from characters put into set battle roles.

== Release ==
The Legend of Legacy was first announced in September 2014 through an issue of V Jump, which reported its release window and setting details. It was initially teased by FuRyu through a "Project Legacy" teaser website. The game was released on January 22, 2015. An American release was published in the region by Atlus USA. Atlus USA chose the title for localization due to their positive working relationship with FuRyu, having already picked up Lost Dimension for release. After it received positive critical reception in Japan, Atlus decided to work with FuRyu to release The Legend of Legacy overseas. A demo was released for digital download on September 22, featuring Eloise, Owen and Filma exploring the game's two opening dungeons. Save data could be transferred from the demo to the main game. The Legend of Legacy was released in North America on October 13, 2015 for physical and digital formats. In addition to the standard edition, a Limited Edition was released with an artbook and soundtrack album. In Europe, the game was published physically and digitally by NIS America on February 5, 2016. For its Western release, the New Game Plus feature was improved so more was carried over between playthroughs.

== Reception ==
Reception

Aggregate score
| Aggregator | Score |
|---|---|
| Metacritic | 67/100 (31 reviews) |

Review scores
| Publication | Score |
|---|---|
| Destructoid | 4.5/10 |
| Electronic Gaming Monthly | 5.5/10 |
| Famitsu | 34/40 |
| GameSpot | 6/10 |
| Nintendo Life | 8/10 |
| Nintendo World Report | 7.5/10 |
| RPGamer | 4/5 |
| RPGFan | 75% |

The Legend of Legacy received high pre-order numbers through Japanese retailer Tsutaya. Upon release, it debuted in Japan with sales of nearly 54,000 units, putting it in second place in sales charts behind Tales of Zestiria. This was the highest debut for any title by FuRyu up to that point, outselling recent titles in the popular Atelier series and selling out in several highstreet stores. During its second week, the game dropped to thirteenth place with further sales of 6,500 units. By January the following year, the game had sold over 74,000 copies in the region. Following its released in North America, the game sold 31,000 units during 2015. Upon its debut in the United Kingdom, it reached ninth place in the dedicated 3DS charts.

The Legend of Legacy received "mixed or average" reviews upon release: aggregate site Metacritic recorded a score of 67% based on reviews from 31 critics.

In a review of Legend of Legacy in Black Gate, Josh Bycer said "This is a perfect example of a game that forces you to find what’s good about it; the game doesn't hold your hand at any point and leaves you to figure out the progression and mechanics. If the game clicks, you're going to have an enjoyable time; if it doesn't, expect to put this one down within minutes."

== Legacy ==
Following the release of The Legend of Legacy, Matsuura wanted to create a story-driven role-playing game similar to those from the genre's golden age. Using ideas predating the development of The Legend of Legacy, Matsuura brought together many of the same developers to create The Alliance Alive. The game was released in Japan on June 22, 2017. An international release for North America and Europe was set for March 27, 2018, localized and published in the regions by Atlus USA.
