= FuRyu =

Japanese entertainment company

FuRyu Corporation
- Logo since 2015
- Native name: フリュー株式会社
- Romanized name: Furyū Kabushiki gaisha
- Type: Kabushiki gaisha
- Industry: Video games
- Founded: April 1, 2007; 19 years ago
- Headquarters: Uguisudanichō, Shibuya, Tokyo, Japan
- Products: Print seal machines; Arcade prizes; Console games; Mobile games; Multimedia content
- Number of employees: 537 (2025/03)
- Website: www.furyu.jp/english/

FuRyu Corporation (フリュー株式会社) is a Japanese entertainment company based in Shibuya, Tokyo. Their businesses include publishing and development of video games, mobile games, photo-booths, figures and multimedia content.

== History ==
In April 1997, Omron launched a new business in the entertainment industry titled "Columbus Project" at their New Business Development Center. The first product is a portrait seal printing machine titled "Ni-Terangelo" (a combination of "Niteru", meaning "to resemble" in Japanese, and Michelangelo). The company continued expanding into the seal printing industry in the following years.

In December 2001, the company entered the mobile content business by starting a media service titled "Poketsu".

In January 2002, the company entered the arcade prizes industry. In April of the same year, the business is officially established and named Omron Entertainment Division. The company is then split off in July 2007, with Omron holding 100% ownership.

In 2006, the company is renamed to FuRyu Corporation. The company also entered the mobile advertising business.

In April 2007, the company implemented a management buyout and succeeded all businesses and all employees to FuRyu Corporation.

In November 2008, FuRyu announced that they are entering the console game development and publishing business. Their first releases are Last Bullet, Chou Meisaku Suiri Adventure DS: Raymond Chandler and Sekai Fushigi Hakken! DS: Densetsu no Hitoshi-kun Ningyou o Sagase! releasing on the Nintendo DS in April, May and August 2009 respectively.

In April 2012, FuRyu acquired all shares of We’ve, which specializes in animation planning. FuRyu also entering the print seal machine specialty store management business and opened a store in Niigata.

FuRyu entered full-scale animation production business in 2013 following their involvement in the production of the movie "Dogsha" released on June 1, 2013.

In 2015, FuRyu changed the company logo also while introducing the company slogan "Precious days, always". In December of the same year, the company is listed on the First Section of the Tokyo Stock Exchange.

As of 2016, OMRON holds a 70% share of the domestic market for photo sticker production machines and is the industry leader. Although OMRON entered the industry in 1997, it was the last company in the industry to enter the market. From the beginning, OMRON's service, which utilizes sensor technology, one of its strengths, to download URLs of images taken by entering the e-mail address of a cell phone into the machine, which can then be downloaded and saved, has been well received by customers. After the bankruptcy of a competitor, Make Software, in 2018, the amusement industry has been dominated by FLEW.

== Games published ==
Title	Original release date	Platform(s)	Developer(s)	Additional publisher(s)
Unchained Blades	July 14, 2011	Nintendo 3DS, PlayStation Portable	ART	NA: Xseed Games
Lost Dimension	August 7, 2014	PlayStation 3, PlayStation Vita	Lancarse	NA: Atlus USA; EU/AU: NIS America; WW: Ghostlight (PC)
The Legend of Legacy	January 22, 2015	Nintendo 3DS	Cattle Call, Grezzo, FuRyu	NA: Atlus USA; EU/AU: NIS America
The Caligula Effect	June 23, 2016	PlayStation Vita	Aquria	WW: Atlus USA
The Alliance Alive	June 22, 2017	Nintendo 3DS	Cattle Call, Grezzo, FuRyu	WW: Atlus USA
Heroland	September 27, 2018	Nintendo Switch, PlayStation 4, Windows	Netchubiyori	WW: Xseed Games
Crystar	October 18, 2018	PlayStation 4, Windows, Nintendo Switch	Gemdrops	WW: Spike Chunsoft; WW: NIS America (Switch)
Doraemon: Nobita's Moons Adventure	February 28, 2019	Nintendo Switch	FuRyu	AS: Arc System Works
The Caligula Effect: Overdose	March 14, 2019	PlayStation 4, Windows, Nintendo Switch	Historia	WW: NIS America
The Alliance Alive HD Remastered	October 8, 2019	Nintendo Switch, PlayStation 4, Windows, Android, iOS	Cattle Call, FuRyu	WW: NIS America; WW: Arc System Works (Android, iOS)
Caligula Effect 2	June 24, 2021	Nintendo Switch, PlayStation 4, Windows	Historia	WW: NIS America
Monark	October 14, 2021	Nintendo Switch, PlayStation 4, PlayStation 5, Windows	Lancarse	WW: NIS America
Trinity Trigger	September 15, 2022	Nintendo Switch, PlayStation 4, PlayStation 5	Three Rings	WW: Xseed Games
Cardfight!! Vanguard Dear Days	November 17, 2022	Nintendo Switch, Windows	FuRyu	WW: Bushiroad
LogiKing	December 15, 2022	Nintendo Switch	FuRyu	WW: FuRyu
Crymachina	July 27, 2023	Nintendo Switch, PlayStation 4, PlayStation 5, Windows	Aquria	WW: NIS America
The Legend of Legacy HD Remastered	February 1, 2024	Nintendo Switch, PlayStation 4, PlayStation 5, Windows	Cattle Call	WW: NIS America
Reynatis	July 25, 2024	Nintendo Switch, PlayStation 4, PlayStation 5, Windows	FuRyu, Natsume Atari	WW: NIS America
Varlet	August 28, 2025	Nintendo Switch, PlayStation 5, Windows	FuRyu	WW: FuRyu
Anomalith	October 29, 2026	Nintendo Switch 2, PlayStation 5, Windows	FuRyu, Natsume Atari	WW: FuRyu
Crymelight	November 5, 2026	Nintendo Switch 2, PlayStation 5, Windows	FuRyu	WW: FuRyu
Travelers 2008	2027	Nintendo Switch 2, PlayStation 5, Windows	FuRyu, Sieg Games	WW: FuRyu

=== Japan-only games ===
Title	Original release date	Platform(s)	Developer(s)
Last Bullet	April 23, 2009	Nintendo DS	Digital Works Entertainment
Chou Meisaku Suiri Adventure DS: Raymond Chandler (Farewell, My Lovely)	May 28, 2009	Nintendo DS	FuRyu
Sekai Fushigi Hakken! DS: Densetsu no Hitoshi-kun Ningyou o Sagase!	August 6, 2009	Nintendo DS	FuRyu
Datenshi no Amai Yuuwaku×Sensual Phrase	February 8, 2010	Nintendo DS	FuRyu
Unchained Blades EXXiV	November 29, 2012	Nintendo 3DS, PlayStation Portable	ART
Exstetra	November 7, 2013	Nintendo 3DS, PlayStation Vita	Studio Saizensen
Kamiwaza Wanda: Kirakira Ichibangai Kikiippatsu	October 27, 2016	Nintendo 3DS	FuRyu
Jewelpet: Magical Rhythm Yay!	November 10, 2011	Nintendo 3DS	FuRyu
Jewelpet: Magical Dance in Style☆Deco!	November 8, 2012	Nintendo 3DS	FuRyu
Jewelpet: Cooking at the Magical Cafe!	November 14, 2013	Nintendo 3DS	FuRyu
Food Wars: The Dish of Friendship and Bonds	December 17, 2015	Nintendo 3DS	FuRyu
The Prince of Tennis: Go to the Top	March 5, 2015	Nintendo 3DS	FuRyu
Terra Formars: Akaki Hoshi no Gekitou	April 2, 2015	Nintendo 3DS	FuRyu
Doraemon: Nobita to Kiseki no Shima	March 1, 2012	Nintendo 3DS	FuRyu
Doraemon: Nobita no Himitsu Dougu Hakubutsukan	March 7, 2013	Nintendo 3DS	FuRyu
Doraemon: Shin Nobita no Daimakyou	March 6, 2014	Nintendo 3DS	FuRyu
Doraemon: Nobita no Space Heroes	March 5, 2015	Nintendo 3DS	FuRyu
Doraemon: Shin Nobita no Nihontanjou	March 3, 2016	Nintendo 3DS	FuRyu
Doraemon: Nobita no Nankyoku Kachikochi Daibouken	March 2, 2017	Nintendo 3DS	FuRyu
Doraemon: Nobita no Takarajima	March 1, 2018	Nintendo 3DS	FuRyu
Cardfight!! Vanguard: Ride to Victory!!	April 11, 2013	Nintendo 3DS	FuRyu
Cardfight!! Vanguard: Lock on Victory!!	June 5, 2014	Nintendo 3DS	FuRyu
Cardfight!! Vanguard G: Stride to Victory!!	January 14, 2016	Nintendo 3DS	FuRyu
Hamatora: Look at Smoking World	July 17, 2014	Nintendo 3DS	FuRyu
Beyblade Burst	November 10, 2016	Nintendo 3DS	FuRyu
Beyblade Burst God	November 23, 2017	Nintendo 3DS	FuRyu
Rilu Rilu Fairilu: Kirakira☆Hajimete no Fairilu Magic ♪	November 10, 2016	Nintendo 3DS	FuRyu
World End Economica: Episode 1	July 27, 2016	Nintendo 3DS	Spicy Tails
World End Economica: Episode 2	September 28, 2016	Nintendo 3DS	Spicy Tails
World End Economica: Episode 3	November 30, 2016	Nintendo 3DS	Spicy Tails
The House in Fata Morgana	July 27, 2016	Nintendo 3DS	Novectacle
Higanbana no Saku Yoru ni	July 27, 2016	Nintendo 3DS	07th Expansion
Noesis: Uso o Tsuita Kioku no Monogatari	November 30, 2016	Nintendo 3DS	Classic Chocolat, SpiritWorks
Himouto! Umaru-chan Dara to Puzzle	March 15, 2017	Nintendo 3DS	FuRyu
Beyblade Burst: Battle Zero	October 25, 2018	Nintendo Switch	FuRyu
Pikachin-Kit: Game de Pirameki Daisakusen	November 8, 2018	Nintendo Switch	FuRyu
Cardfight!! Vanguard EX	September 19, 2019	Nintendo Switch	FuRyu
Doraemon: Nobita No Shin Kyouryuu	March 5, 2020	Nintendo Switch	FuRyu
MODEL Debut2 #nicola	November 4, 2021	Nintendo Switch	FuRyu
Doraemon: Nobita no Uchuu Shou Sensou	March 4, 2022	Nintendo Switch	FuRyu
Battle Spirits: Connected Battlers	April 14, 2022	Nintendo Switch, PlayStation 4	FuRyu
Tsukumonogatari	January 27, 2011	PlayStation Portable	Killaware
Bunmei Kaika Aoiza Ibunroku	August 18, 2011	PlayStation Portable	HuneX
Bunmei Kaika Aoiza Ibunroku Saien	May 17, 2012	PlayStation Portable	HuneX
Hatsukare☆Renai Debut Sengen!	April 4, 2013	PlayStation Portable	Vridge Inc.
To Love-Ru: Darkness Battle Ecstasy	May 22, 2014	PlayStation Vita	FuRyu
To Love-Ru: Darkness True Princess	November 11, 2015	PlayStation Vita	FuRyu
Himouto! Umaru-chan Himouto Ikusei Keikaku	December 13, 2015	PlayStation Vita	FuRyu
Yuki Yuna is a Hero: Jukai no Kioku	February 26, 2015	PlayStation Vita	FuRyu
Pastel Memories	October 12, 2017	Android, iOS	FuRyu
