= Monark (video game) =

- Developer: Lancarse
- Publishers: JP: FuRyu; NA/EU: NIS America
- Directors: Fuyuki Hayashi; Mitsuhiro Hoshino
- Composer: Tsukasa Masuko
- Platforms: PlayStation 4; PlayStation 5; Nintendo Switch; Microsoft Windows
- Release: PlayStation 4, PlayStation 5, Nintendo Switch: JP: October 14, 2021; NA: February 22, 2022; EU: February 25, 2022; Microsoft Windows: WW: February 22, 2022
- Genre: Tactical role-playing
- Mode: Single-player

Monark (Note: Monark (モナーク, Monāku)) is a 2021 Japanese role-playing game developed by Lancarse for the PlayStation 4, PlayStation 5 and Nintendo Switch. It was localized and ported to Microsoft Windows by NIS America in February 2022. The game received mixed reviews from critics. It has a sequel known as VARLET, which is set three years later and came out in 2025.

== Gameplay ==
Monark is a tactical role-playing game with combat similar to Lost Dimension. Gameplay is split between the character evolving their own desires by exploring the school campus, and fighting monsters called "daemons" in the Otherworld.

== Story ==
Monark takes place inside Shin Mikado Academy, a high school sealed from the outside world by a barrier and enveloped in a mysterious mist that drives the students mad. The player is part of a group of students who gained the ability to enter an Otherworld, where the demons empowering the mist must be defeated.

== Development ==
The game is developed by Lancarse and published by FuRyu. Some members of the staff from the Shin Megami Tensei series were involved in the game's development. Fuyuki Hayashi wrote the scenario and dialogue for all of the major characters, while Ryutaro Ito wrote for the NPC characters. Kazunari Suzuki provided supervision and feedback on all parts of the scenario.

== Reception ==
Reception

Aggregate score
Aggregator	Score
Metacritic	NS: 62/100; PC: 73/100; PS4: 56/100; PS5: 66/100

Review scores
Publication	Score
Destructoid	6/10
Famitsu	30/40
Hardcore Gamer	3.5/5
HobbyConsolas	75/100
IGN	6/10
Jeuxvideo.com	13/20
Nintendo Life	7/10
Nintendo World Report	5.5/10
Push Square	4/10
RPGamer	3.5/5
RPGFan	70/100
The Games Machine (Italy)	7.5/10
TouchArcade	3/5

Monark received "mixed or average" reviews from critics, according to review aggregator website Metacritic.

IGN lauded the game's personalness, combat systems, and abilities, and cited the unengaging story, characters, party member system, enemies, repetition, and puzzles as its drawbacks. Destructoid severely criticized the game's repetitive nature and concluded, "There are some novel ideas here, and if you’re looking for something outside the RPG status quo and with a darker vibe, Monark could fit the bill. Just go in knowing that it can get arduous, and you’ll need to overlook those faults to find what Monark does that’s really different." Nintendo Life praised the high-risk, high-reward combat system, creepy aesthetics, interesting story, and replay value, while criticizing the lackluster graphics, repetitive environments, and lack of enemy variety. Push Square reviewed the game much more negatively, and cited the use of the horror genre, boss designs, and music, as positives, while calling the repetitive, grindy combat the game's biggest downfall. RPGFan liked the vocal tracks, opening cinematic, characters, themes and combat, and said that the game's bad pacing, subpar graphics and the transphobic treatment of the character of Perrine held it back. Nintendo World Report thought that the story was interesting and that the stat progression system was unique but disliked the lack of environments, character-locking progression system, and puzzle design.

=== Sales ===
In Japan, the Nintendo Switch version sold 10,521 physical units, making it the sixth best-selling game during its first week of release. The PlayStation 4 version sold 5,242 physical units, making it the seventeenth best-selling game in the country during the same week.
