= Sarugakuchō, Shibuya =

District in Shibuya, Tokyo, Japan

Sarugakuchō 猿楽町
- Neighborhood in Shibuya
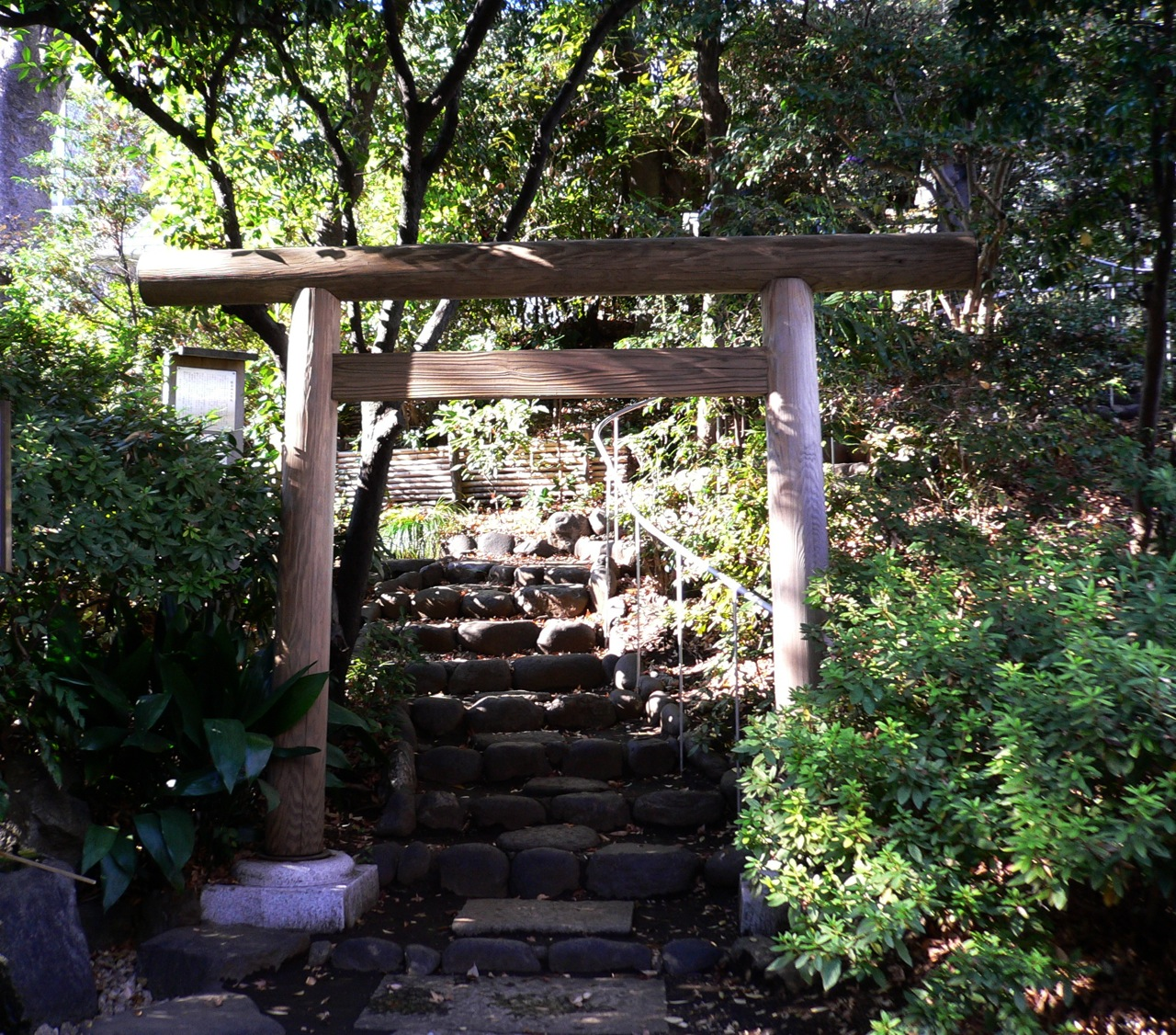
- Sarugaku Shrine
- Interactive map of Sarugakuchō
- Country: Japan
- Prefecture: Tokyo
- Special ward: Shibuya

Population (1 October 2020)
  - Total: 1,851
- Time zone: UTC+09:00
- ZIP code: 150-0033
- Telephone area code: 03

Sarugakuchō (猿楽町) is a district of Shibuya, Tokyo, Japan.

As of October 2020, the population of this district is 1,851. The postal code for Sarugakuchō is 150–0033.

The embassy of Denmark is located here, while notable local landmarks include the Kyu Asakura House.

== Geography ==
Sarugakuchō borders Uguisudanichō in the north, Shibuya to the east, Daikanyamachō to the south, and Aobadai to the west.

== Places of interest ==
=== Cultural ===
==== Shrines ====
- Sarugaku Shrine (猿楽神社) (within the grounds of Hillside Terrace)

=== Embassies ===
- Embassy of Denmark (Sarugakuchō 29-6)

=== Schools ===
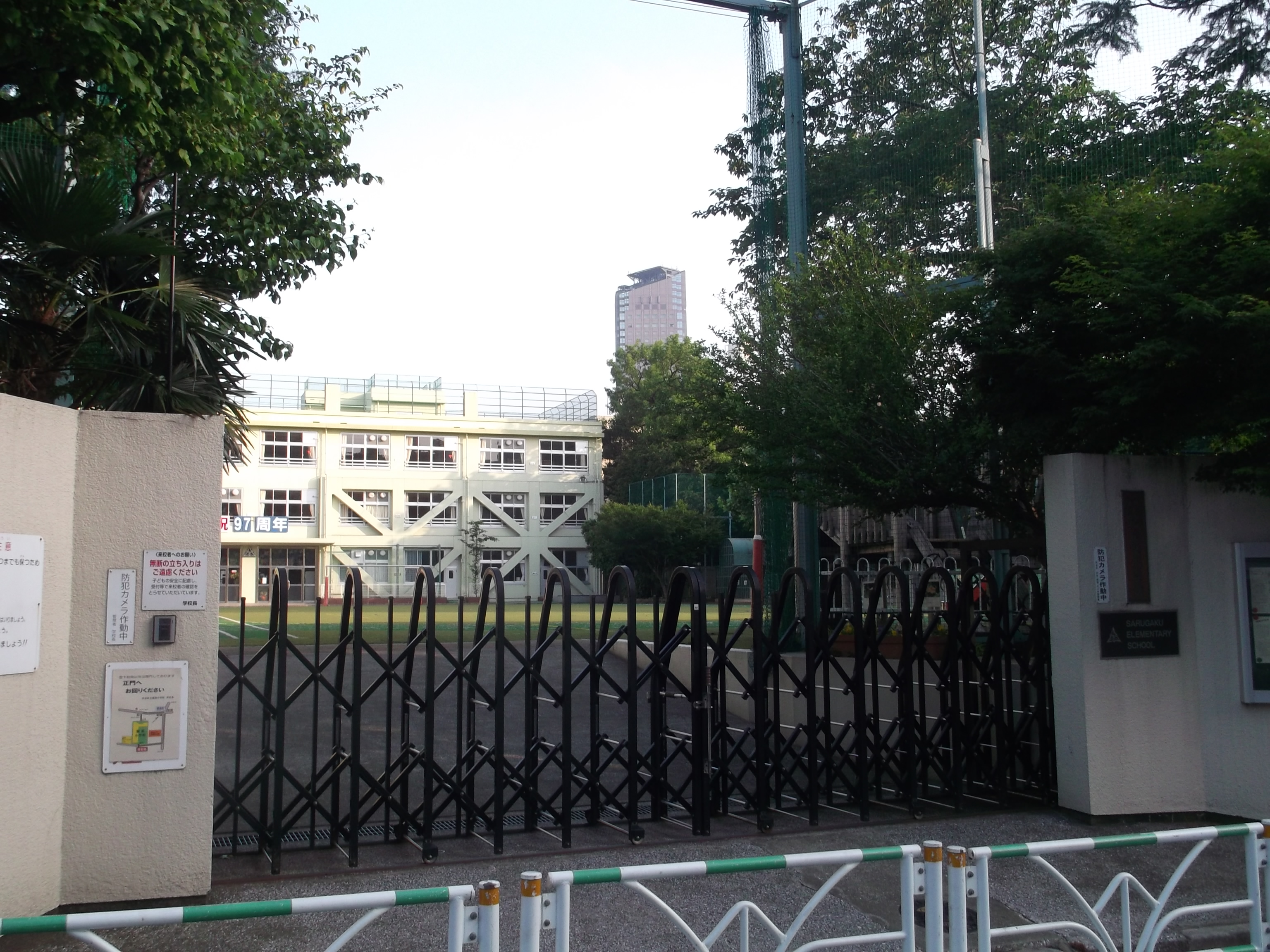
Sarugaku Elementary School (渋谷区立猿楽小学校)

Shibuya Board of Education operates public elementary and junior high schools.

Schools in Sarugakucho:

- Sarugaku Elementary School (渋谷区立猿楽小学校) (Sarugakuchō 12-35)

All of Sarugakucho is zoned to Sarugaku Elementary, and Hachiyama Junior High School (鉢山中学校).

=== Other ===
- Kyu Asakura House (Sarugakuchō 29-20)
- Sarugakukodaijukyoato Park (猿楽古代住居跡公園) (Sarugakuchō 12-5)
- Hillside Terrace
- Daikanyama T-Site
