= Tsukumonogatari =

2011 video game

- Official cover art featuring (from left to right): Emina Ikari, Haruka Minami, and Yūto Ishigami.
- Developer: Killaware
- Publisher: FuRyu
- Artist: Fukahire
- Platform: PlayStation Portable
- Release: JP: January 27, 2011
- Genre: Adventure RPG
- Mode: Single-player

Tsukumonogatari (つくものがたり) is an adventure RPG for the PlayStation Portable developed by Killaware and published by FuRyu. The game was released on January 27, 2011, in Japan.

== Gameplay ==
As Yūto, the player will explore the school and look for objects that might be occupied by a spirit. Once the player finds an object that is believed to be possessed, the player can take a picture of it with the mobile phone. Each time the player takes a photo, 5 minutes of in-game time pass. During battles, the player can send an e-mail from the mobile phone with a particular picture attached to it to summon the respective spirit to aid Yūto.

Tsukumonogatari emphasizes the "power of words" as part of its battle system. Yūto's school is populated by several people, including his friends and the school staff themselves. The player can go around talking to different people at school, and engaging in conversation with them. Occasionally, they will narrate a proverb or a rumor or a myth to the player. These are "words".

Different "words" can be attached to spirits during battles to give them various abilities, and they are vital when battling against the Ayakashi. When a battle begins, the player will be able to summon a spirit and add up to a maximum of three "words" to it to decide what abilities it will possess in battle.

== Plot ==
=== Story ===
One day, Yūto Ishigami finds himself pushed out of a classroom window by a fellow student. Miraculously, he survives the fall, and wakes up with the ability to see the supernatural. Yūto's school has been invaded by demons, known as "Ayakashi". These are the cause for the recent incidents that have been plaguing people. Luckily, objects known as "Yorishiro" — everyday items occupied by helpful spirits — are strewn in abundance around the school as well, and these are the key to combating the Ayakashi invasion.

=== Characters ===
- Yūto Ishigami (石神 優斗, Ishigami Yūto)
- Kutabe (クタベ, Kutabe)

Voiced by: Emiri Katō

- Ayaka Abe (安倍 彩香, Abe Ayaka)

Voiced by: Yū Kobayashi

- Haruka Minami (皆見 遙香, Minami Haruka)

Voiced by: Yui Horie

- Emina Ikari (伊狩 恵美奈, Ikari Emina)

Voiced by: Rie Kugimiya

- Tamaki Kurashina (倉科 珠希, Kurashina Tamaki)

Voiced by: Yukari Tamura

- Hiroshi Itō (伊東 博嗣, Itō Hiroshi)

Voiced by: Yuichi Nakamura

- Kenji Komori (古森 賢児, Komori Kenji)

Voiced by: Hiro Shimono

== Music ==
The opening theme song is "Voice", and the ending theme song is "Aria" (アリア), both are composed and sung by Mitsuki Saiga feat. JUST.
