= Reynatis =

2024 video game

- Developers: Natsume Atari; FuRyu
- Publishers: FuRyu; NIS America
- Director: Takumi Isobe
- Producer: Takumi Isobe
- Artist: Yasutaka Kaburagi
- Writer: Kazushige Nojima
- Composer: Yoko Shimomura
- Engine: Unity
- Platforms: PlayStation 4, PlayStation 5, Nintendo Switch, Windows
- Release: PS4, PS5, Switch: JP: July 25, 2024; WW: September 27, 2024; Windows: WW: September 27, 2024
- Genre: Action role-playing
- Mode: Single-player

Reynatis (Note: Japanese: レナティス) is a 2024 action role-playing game developed by Natsume Atari and FuRyu, and published by FuRyu and NIS America. It was released in Japan for PlayStation 4, PlayStation 5, and Nintendo Switch in July 2024 and worldwide, including for Windows, in September 2024.

== Gameplay ==
Reynatis revolves around playing in two modes, Suppressed Mode and Liberated Mode. In Suppressed Mode, the player character cannot attack, but is able to dodge enemy attacks with the press of a single button. In Liberated Mode, the player character has access to offensive magic, but is unable to block. The player can access both modes in real-time.

== Plot ==
The game takes place in Shibuya, Tokyo, where the use of magic is legally forbidden and wizards face oppression. It follows two main characters, the wizard Marin Kirizumi and the governance officer Sari Nishijima.

== Development and release ==
Reynatis was developed in Unity engine. Isobe Takumi said he was influenced by trailers of Final Fantasy Versus XIII, a cancelled game that was eventually transformed into Final Fantasy XV.

The soundtrack was composed by Yoko Shimomura, and the scenario was written by Kazushige Nojima. Other members of the development team include artist Yasutaka Kaburagi and director Takumi Isobe. The game has a subquest featuring the characters from Square Enix's Neo: The World Ends with You. It was first teased in an April Fools' Day joke that year. Takumi said he pursued the collaboration because he was a fan of The World Ends with You and thought it was the most famous work that involves Shibuya.

Reynatis was first announced by FuRyu on February 21, 2024, via Nintendo Direct. A physical limited release called the Liberators Edition was unveiled. The demo for the Nintendo Switch was made available via Nintendo eShop in Japan on June 18, 2024. The demo version granted the player bonuses for use in the full release depending on the player's status when they cleared it. The demo for PlayStation 4 and PlayStation 5 came out in the country on June 21. In the rest of the world, NIS America launched the demo for all initial release platforms simultaneously on September 13, 2024.

== Reception ==
Reception

Aggregate scores
Aggregator	Score
Metacritic	NS: 61/100; PC: 64/100; PS5: 58/100
OpenCritic	21% recommend

Review scores
Publication	Score
Hardcore Gamer	PC: 3/5
Nintendo Life	NS: 5/10
Push Square	PS5: 5/10
RPGamer	NS: 2/5
RPGFan	PS5: 68/100
VG247	PS5: 3/5
Siliconera	NS: 7/10
Digitally Downloaded	NS: 3.5/5

Reynatis received "mixed or average" reviews according to review aggregator website Metacritic. 21% of the critics recommended the game according to OpenCritic.

Nintendo Life praised the quirks and simplicity of the gameplay, but the complicated exposition didn't resonate while playing.
