= The Alliance Alive =

2017 video game

- North American cover art
- Developer: Cattle Call (Note: Additional work by Grezzo)
- Publishers: JP: FuRyu; WW: Atlus USA (3DS); WW: NIS America (HD)
- Director: Masataka Matsuura
- Producer: Masataka Matsuura
- Designer: Kyoji Koizumi
- Artists: Ryo Hirao; Masayo Asano
- Writer: Yoshitaka Murayama
- Composer: Masashi Hamauzu
- Platforms: Nintendo 3DS; PlayStation 4; Nintendo Switch; Microsoft Windows; Android; iOS
- Release: Nintendo 3DS: JP: June 22, 2017; WW: March 27, 2018; Nintendo Switch, PS4: NA: October 8, 2019; JP: October 10, 2019; EU: October 11, 2019; Microsoft Windows: WW: January 16, 2020; Android, iOS: JP: February 1, 2021; WW: December 6, 2022
- Genre: Role-playing
- Mode: Single-player

The Alliance Alive (Note: (Japanese: アライアンス・アライブ)) is a role-playing video game developed by Cattle Call for the Nintendo 3DS. The game was released in Japan by FuRyu in 2017, and was released worldwide by Atlus USA in 2018. The story follows a group of characters as they mount a rebellion against a race of Daemons that have ruled over humans since blotting out the sun a millennium before. Gameplay follows many traditions of the Japanese role-playing genre, including turn-based battles and navigation using a world map.

Development of The Alliance Alive began following the completion of The Legend of Legacy in 2015, although its concept predated the creation of The Legend of Legacy. The aim was to create a classic role-playing game balancing gameplay and story which used player feedback from the previous game. Most of the original staff returned including director Masataka Matsuura, artist Ryo Hirao, designer Kyoji Koizumi, and composer Masashi Hamauzu. The scenario was written by Yoshitaka Murayama, noted for his work on the Suikoden series. This is the last FuRyu game to be published by Atlus USA before moving to NIS America for future titles.

A high-definition remaster under the title The Alliance Alive HD Remastered for PlayStation 4 and Nintendo Switch was released in October 2019. This version of the game was also released for Microsoft Windows in January 2020, and released on Android and iOS in February 2021.

== Gameplay ==
The Alliance Alive is a role-playing video game in which the player takes control of a group eventually numbering twelve characters (however, Robbins, Shiki, and Matilda are optional), navigating an unnamed fantasy world in a quest to free it from the control of otherworldly beings called Daemons. Players explore a world map, first on foot and later using vehicles which can unlock previously inaccessible parts of the map. During the course of the story, the party unites human-staffed Guilds scattered across the land, based in Guild Towers which are either found on the world map or can be built by the player in select locations. There are five types of Guild Towers available, which grant different status buffs to the party, with the type of Guild Tower available to build depending on which characters have been recruited into the party. Guild Towers can communicate with each other during the course of the game using the Telegraph system, which allows Towers to gain experience levels and unlock new abilities.

Enemy characters are represented within environments and on the world map as symbols, with battles triggering when the party runs into them. Multiple enemy parties can be tagged for a series of back-to-back battles. Battles are governed by a turn-based battle system within a themed battle arena. Characters are arranged in formations on a three-by-five grid, with different formations granting unique defensive and offensive abilities. Magic is only accessible to Daemon characters, although certain weapon types can access magic-like abilities for human characters such as healing. During combat, characters can enter an "Ignition" state once the Ignition gauge is filled from being attacked. Entering an Ignition state, which can rise in intensity based on current skills, attack power is increased at the cost of higher skill point consumption for special abilities. When in an Ignition state, a character can launch a special "Final Strike" attack which deals high damage. If a character in the same class as the attacker is next to them, they will "Reinforce" the Final Strike, creating a longer attack chain.

Rather than a traditional experience point-based leveling system, character skills grow more powerful through "Awakening" when used often enough. Completing successive battles will increase a skill's growth. Characters have access to five weapon types with differing strengths and weaknesses: Swords, Great Swords, Axes, Spears, Staffs, Bows, Shields, and Martial Arts. These weapon types can be equipped to any character, and have specific Awakening skills tied to them. Triggering a battle near a Guild Tower enables Telegraph abilities which aid the party in battle, such as creating a shield or dealing a powerful attack to all enemies at the beginning of a battle. A separate "Talent" system can be raised for each character using Talent Points earned after each battle. Assigning these points to Talents will increase a character attribute such as their ability to regain health or energy, their weapon skills, and status buffs during navigation of the world map.

== Synopsis ==
=== Setting and characters ===
The Alliance Alive takes place in a fantasy world divided into four lands separated by ocean. A thousand years before the story begins, the world of humans was invaded by Daemons, who feared an energy from the human realm called Chaos. Their invasion culminated in the creation of a barrier which caused catastrophic climate changes and generated a cross-shaped flow of energy dubbed the Dark Current to destroy much of humanity. Those that remained were quickly subjugated, and the Dark Current settled into the world's oceans, cutting off each land from its neighbors and turning the sky black. By the game's events, the world is divided into zones ruled by a hierarchical government with the Daemons as its supreme rulers.

The nine main characters are members of the Night Crows, a human resistance group who fight the Daemons and seek to restore control of the world to humanity. They are Galil, a young boy with a kind personality; Azura, a cheerful woman who often drags Galil on her adventures; Renzo, an optimistic young man with a wealth of information; Barbarosa, a monster soldier who swore loyalty to Azura's father after he saved his life; Vivian, a historian and the daughter of a Daemon overlord; Ignace, Vivian's Daemon butler; Tiggy, a young girl studying the Dark Current; Gene, a man who has acquired magical powers due to an associated with the Daemons; and Rachel, a kind-hearted mercenary. The player may also recruit three additional characters; Robbins the Penguin, Shiki the samauri, and Matilda the Dragoon.

== Development ==
Following the release of The Legend of Legacy in 2015, Masataka Matsuura looked at what his next project could be. During discussions for a new game on the Nintendo 3DS, the suggestion of a sequel to The Legend of Legacy was frequently raised, but Matsuura felt that an adequate sequel which addressed player criticisms could only be done on more powerful gaming hardware. The main requests following the release of The Legend of Legacy was for a deeper story and characters, but as this would make the game a sequel "only in name", he insisted that the game should be completely original. Concepts for The Alliance Alive were around during the development of The Legend of Legacy, and Matsuura was determined to develop the game as a "normal RPG" using his experience making The Legend of Legacy. When pitching the project, he was afraid its scale and budgetary requirements would result in it being rejected. The game was primarily developed by Japanese studio Cattle Call, with additional design work by Grezzo and general supervision by the game's publisher FuRyu; these developers had also worked on The Legend of Legacy. Matsuura, who acted as both producer and director, wanted to gather a prestigious team indicative of the type of games he wanted to emulate to develop the game. SaGa series veteran Kyoji Koizumi acted as game designer, and SaGa background artist Masayo Asano was the game's art director. The prestigious development team were part of Matsuura's wish for a high quality role-playing game. Grezzo assisted with development.

=== Design ===
The aim was to create a game that would evoke the character-focused narrative and role-playing experience of the Ultima and Wizardry series, in addition to classic RPGs from the genre's golden age. While there were several gameplay similarities between The Alliance Alive and The Legend of Legacy, Koizumi noted that the biggest difference was the expanded party size in battle and their more stable job-based roles. The character stance, Awakening skill learning, and grid positioning systems were improved versions of those used in The Legend of Legacy, but with more explanation given to players through character interaction. The Ignition and Final Strike features were included to attract players while not making it convoluted. Talent points were implemented based on users wanting an equivalent to experience point-based leveling up from other RPGs without compromising the Awakening mechanic. In contrast to other games of the time, a world map was implemented for navigation, which in turn expanded the number of enemies and locations to explore. The aim was to allow players to explore and picture the world as had been done in classic games of the genre. Much of the game was built using the same engine and multiple assets from The Legend of Legacy.

The scenario was written by Yoshitaka Murayama, one of the creators of the Suikoden series. Murayama was brought on board the project by Matsuura alongside Koizumi. The world concept was created by Matsuura and Koizumi and given to Murayama, who then created the rest of the game's scenario and characters. Murayama was the one who proposed nine protagonists, and due to its leaning towards a young cast, Matsuura and Koizumi requested an older sister and mentor figure, as well as a non-human party member. As was common with Murayama's scenarios, the cast included a number of upbeat and empowered female characters. It was decided from an early stage that controversial actions such as party betrayal would not be included, as that could potentially annoy or alienate players. Unlike The Legend of Legacy, players could not choose which protagonist to start out as while still keeping it as an ensemble experience. This was done to help build a stronger connection with the cast and improve the storytelling elements over the previous game. The expanded story was one of the elements that differentiated the game from The Legend of Legacy, and became much larger than originally intended. As with The Legend of Legacy, no voice acting was included in the game, putting it in contrast with the majority of RPGs at the time which used famous Japanese voice actors to help with promotions and potential multimedia adaptations. The reasons for not including it were its effect on the game's pacing and the wish to allow players to imagine the characters' voices.

Asano was brought on as art director by Matsuura, having previously held the role for The Legend of Legacy. Asano was chosen due to his preferred "solid" watercolor artstyle, qualities Matsuura felt were needing to create a distinctive world map design rather than the "fancy" style used by The Legend of Legacy. The character designs were drawn by Ryo Hirao, who had been character designer for The Legend of Legacy. As there were nine distinct locations with their own narratives, each playable character was designed to appear like the game's protagonist. The characters were designed by Hirao based on Matsuura's requests and Murayama's scenario, with the artstyle shifting from that used in The Legend of Legacy with characters having smaller heads and slimmer builds. The design colors emulated Asano's concept art, with individual coloring and clothing directly inspired by their homeland and backstory. The character models were rendered from the completed character artwork using a similar technique to The Legend of Legacy; mapping portions of the artwork onto a three-dimensional model and adjusting it to be distinct. The process was supervised by Hirao and Yuichiro Kojima. The entire graphic design department of Cattle Call worked on designing character models, with these models being used for both gameplay and cutscenes. Kojima and Ryoji Shimogama worked on monster designs, returning from The Legend of Legacy.

=== Music ===
The music was primarily composed by Masashi Hamauzu, who had most notably worked on games in the Final Fantasy series, in addition to being the composer for The Legend of Legacy. When creating the music, Hamauzu used his trademark style of merging orchestral and synthetic elements to portray multiple emotions and feelings in a single piece of music. Hamauzu was given concept art and completed cutscenes, then composed musical pieces in line with the images. With each realm in the game, which could vary in theme and style, unique musical elements were incorporated. Rather than an orchestra, Hamauzu used a small group of performers with instruments such as a violin and a guitar, then overlaying them when adding the synthesized elements. Two tracks were composed by Hamauzu's daughter Ayane Hamauzu, with one arrangement by Toru Tabei.

== Release ==
The Alliance Alive was first announced in October 2016, along with its principle staff, development studio and publisher. When the game was announced, the staff were optimizing several elements such as distances between locations and encounter rates on the world map. Originally scheduled for release on March 30, 2017, the game was delayed by nearly three months to increase its quality. A game demo was released on its original release date of March 30. Using player feedback from the demo, the development team were able to make adjustments to the game, such as gameplay speed and font size. The game released on June 22 of that year, with a special soundtrack and 3DS themes releasing along with the game as compensation for the delay.

The game was announced for a Western release in September 2017, three months after its Japanese release. The game, released in March 2018, was localized by Atlus USA. It received physical and digital releases in North America, and was exclusive to digital platforms in Europe. A launch edition was released in North America, featuring a 20-track soundtrack CD, artbook and keychain packaged with the game.

A high-definition remaster under the title The Alliance Alive HD Remastered for PlayStation 4 and Nintendo Switch was released on October 8, 2019. Unlike the original game published outside Japan by Atlus, this western release was handled by NIS America. NIS America also published the Microsoft Windows version, that was released on January 16, 2020, in all territories. The ports of the remastered version were released on Android and iOS in February 2021.

== Reception ==
Reception

Aggregate score
Aggregator	Score
Metacritic	3DS: 74/100; NS: 74/100; PS4: 74/100

Review scores
Publication	Score
Destructoid	3DS: 6.5/10
Famitsu	3DS: 34/40
Nintendo Life	(HD) 9/10
Nintendo World Report	(HD) 6.5/10
RPGamer	3DS: 2.5/5
RPGFan	(HD) 85/100

The Alliance Alive and its remaster received mixed reviews, with all versions receiving a 74/100 on Metacritic.

During its first week of release in Japan, The Alliance Alive debuted in second place in gaming charts behind Nintendo Switch exclusive Arms, with sales of over 31,000 units.
