= Aobadai =

Neighborhood in Meguro, Tokyo, Japan

Aobadai 青葉台
- Neighborhood
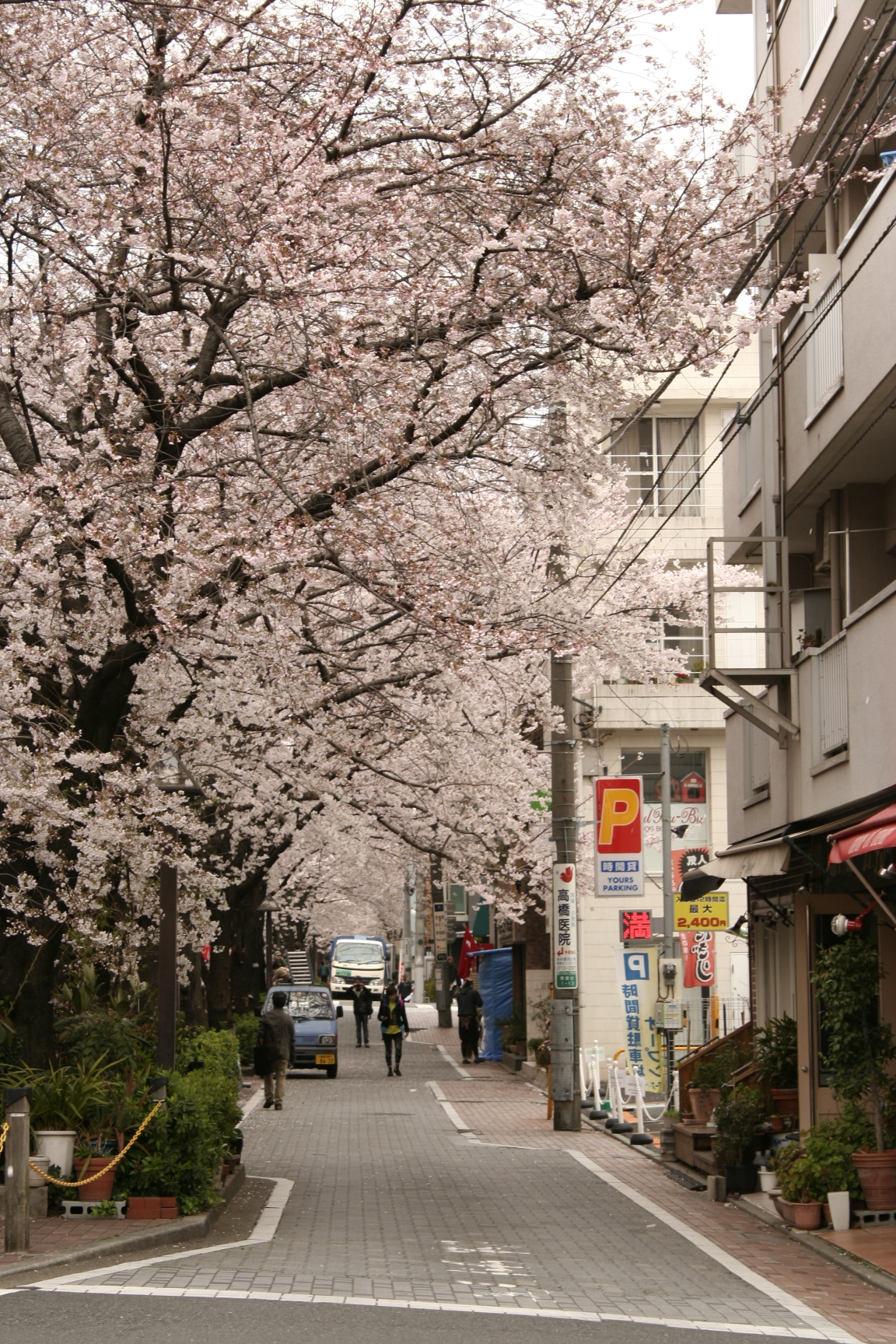
- Aobadai 1-13
- Interactive map of Aobadai
- Country: Japan
- Prefecture: Tokyo
- Special ward: Meguro

Population (1 October 2020)
  - Total: 8,362
- Time zone: UTC+09:00
- ZIP code: 153-0041
- Telephone area code: 03

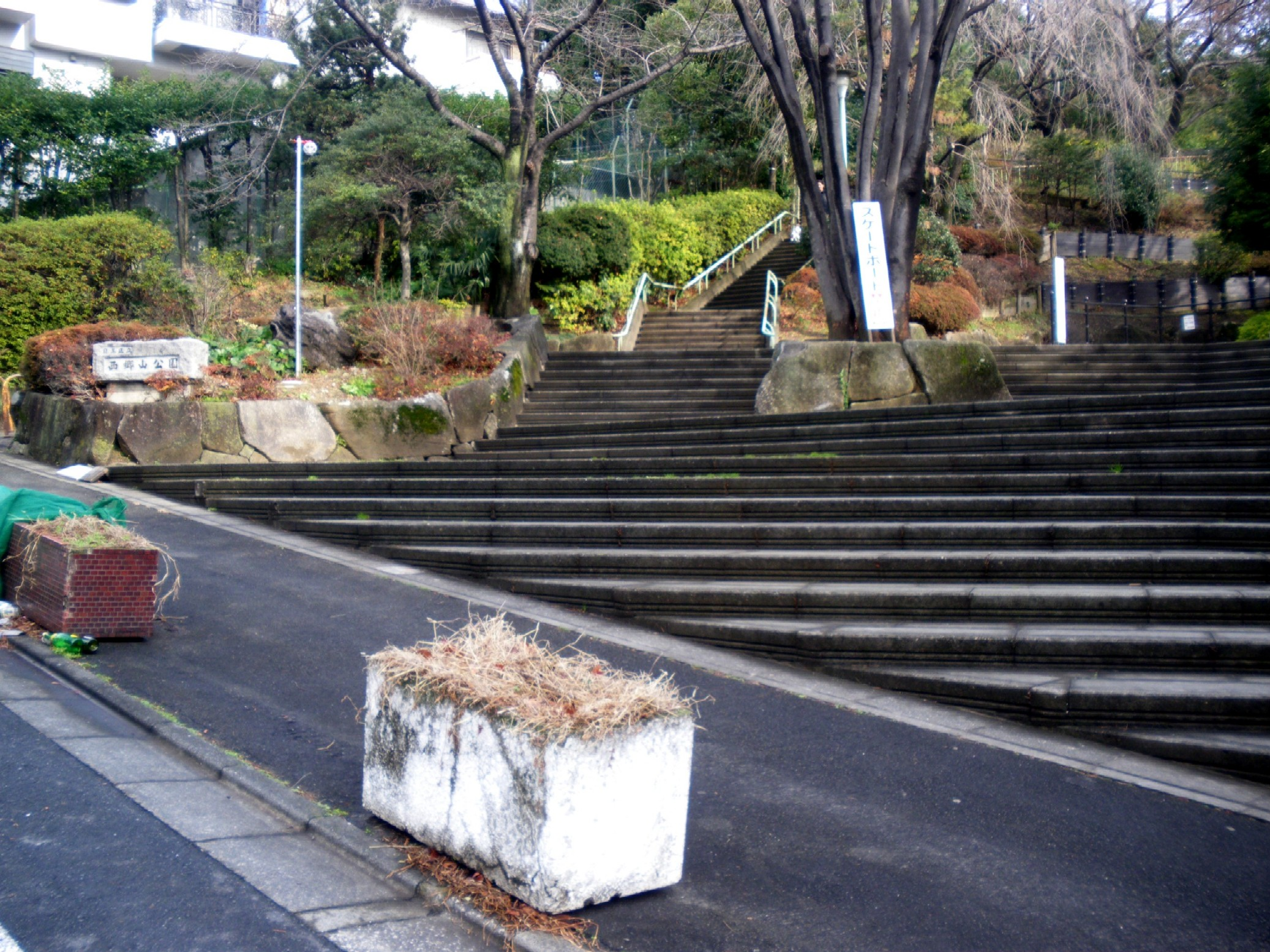
Saigōyama Park

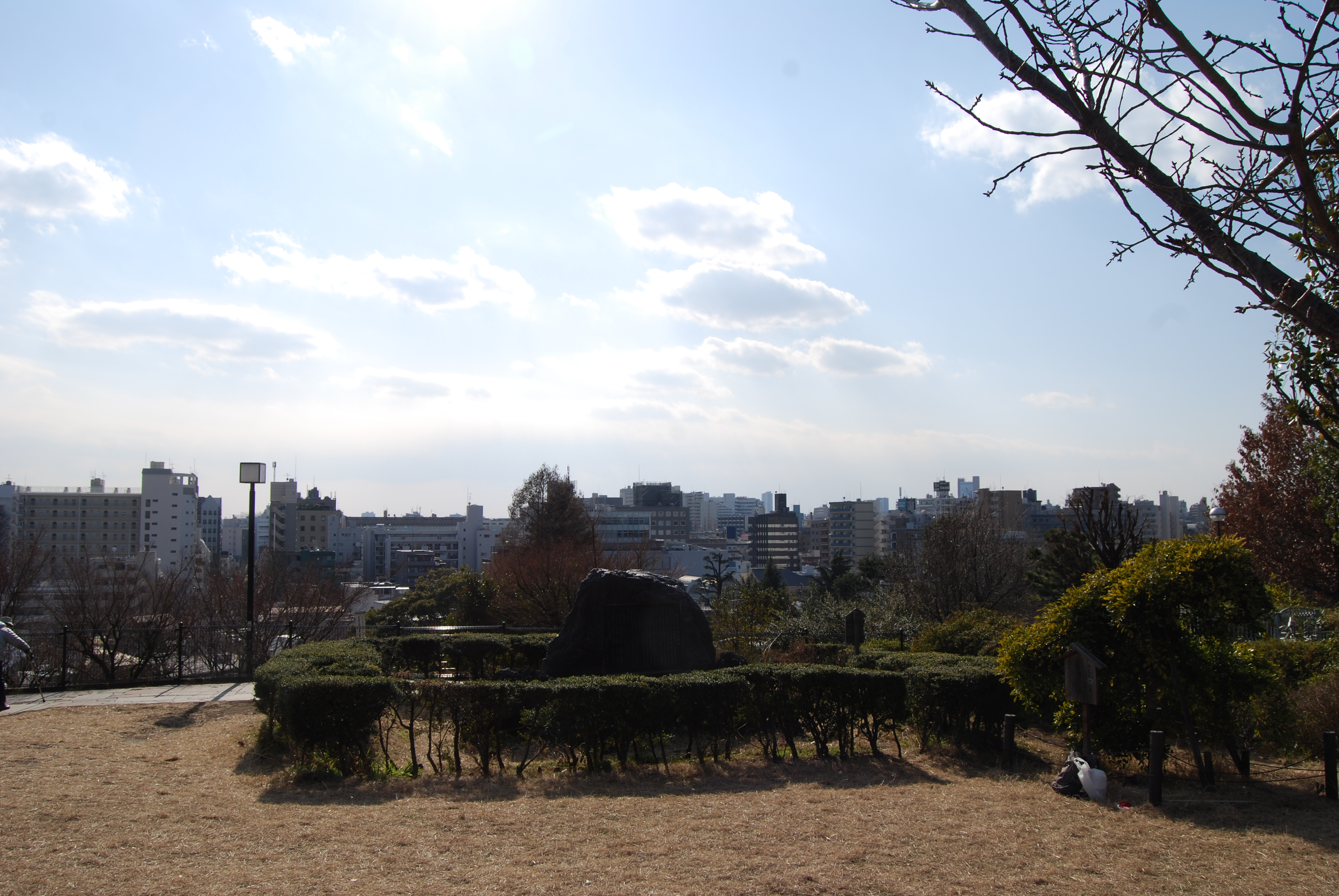
View from Saigōyama Park

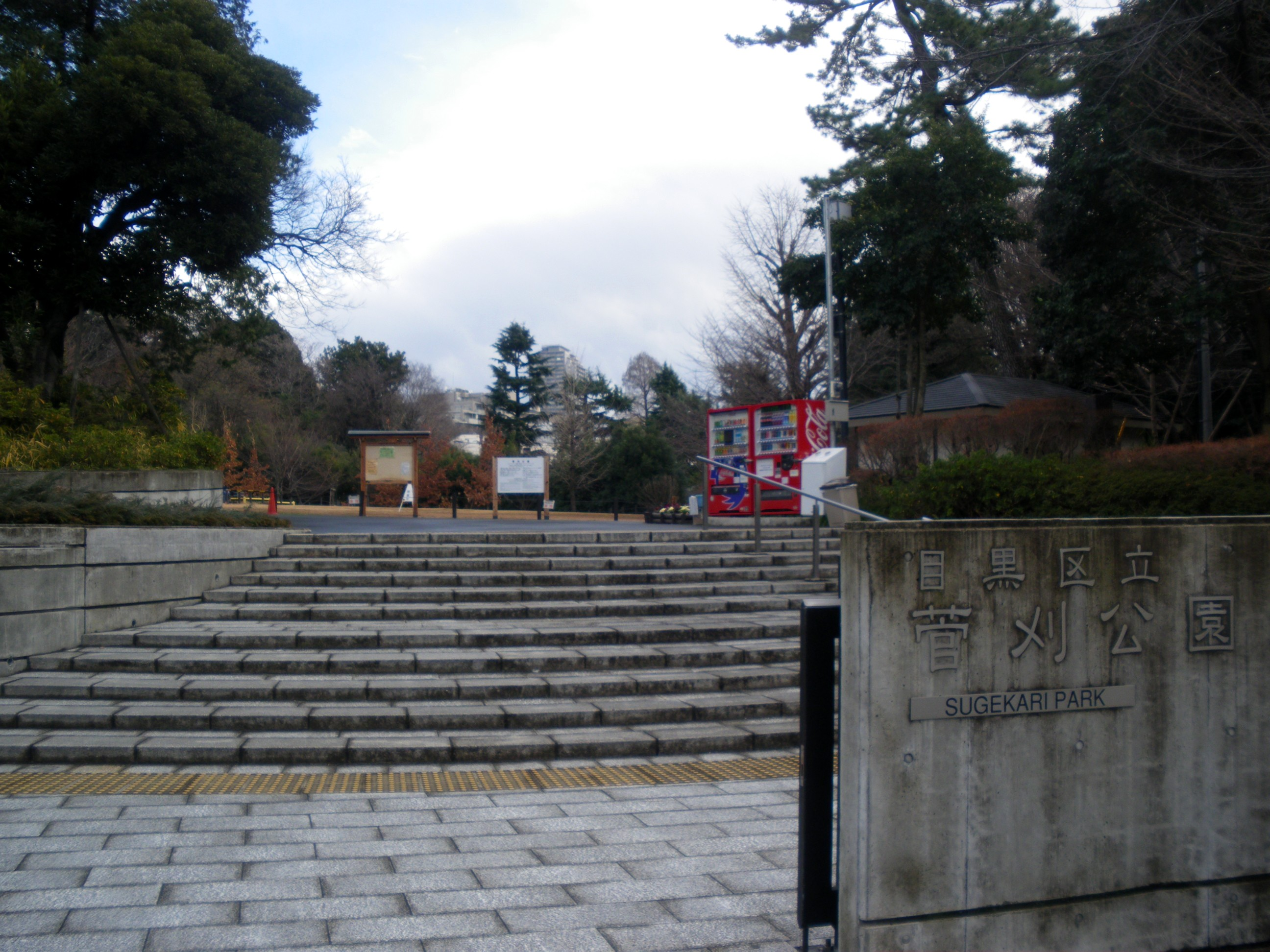
Sugekari Park

Aobadai (青葉台) is a district located in the northern portion of Meguro, Tokyo, Japan, which consists of 1 to 4-chōme. As of October 1, 2020, it has a total population of 8,362.

== Geography ==
The Aobadai district borders Shinsenchō, Nanpeidaichō, Hachiyamachō, and Sarugakuchō on the north across Kyūyamate Dōri Avenue (旧山手通り); Kamimeguro on the south; and Higashiyama, Ōhashi, Komaba on the west and northwest across Yamate Dōri Avenue (山手通り).

A hillside neighborhood in Aobadai 2-chōme is known as Saigōyama (西郷山), literally meaning "Saigō Mountain." It was named so because Saigō Tsugumichi, a Meiji-period politician and a younger brother of Saigō Takamori, owned a mansion there. The mansion was moved to the Meiji Mura museum in Inuyama, Aichi for preservation, and the site where Saigō's house existed is home to Saigōyama Park (西郷山公園) and Sugekari Park (菅刈公園).

== Places of interest ==
=== Embassies ===
- Embassy of Egypt (Aobadai 1-5-4)
- Embassy of Senegal (Aobadai 1-3-4)

=== Other ===
- Japan Map Center (Aobadai 4-9-6)

== Education ==
Meguro City Board of Education operates public elementary and junior high schools.

All of Aobadai 2-4-chome and part of 1-chome are zoned to Sugekari Elementary School (菅刈小学校) and No. 1 Junior High School (第一中学校). Parts of 1-chome are zoned to Karasumori Elementary School (烏森小学校) and Higashiyama Junior High School (東山中学校).

Aobadai is home to an 1875-established elementary school, Sugekari Elementary School (菅刈小学校).

The institution of higher education located in this district is Sanno University. Although its main campus is located in Isehara, Kanagawa, the university maintains the "Daikanyama Campus" in this district. The Aoba - Japan International School is also located in Aobadai.

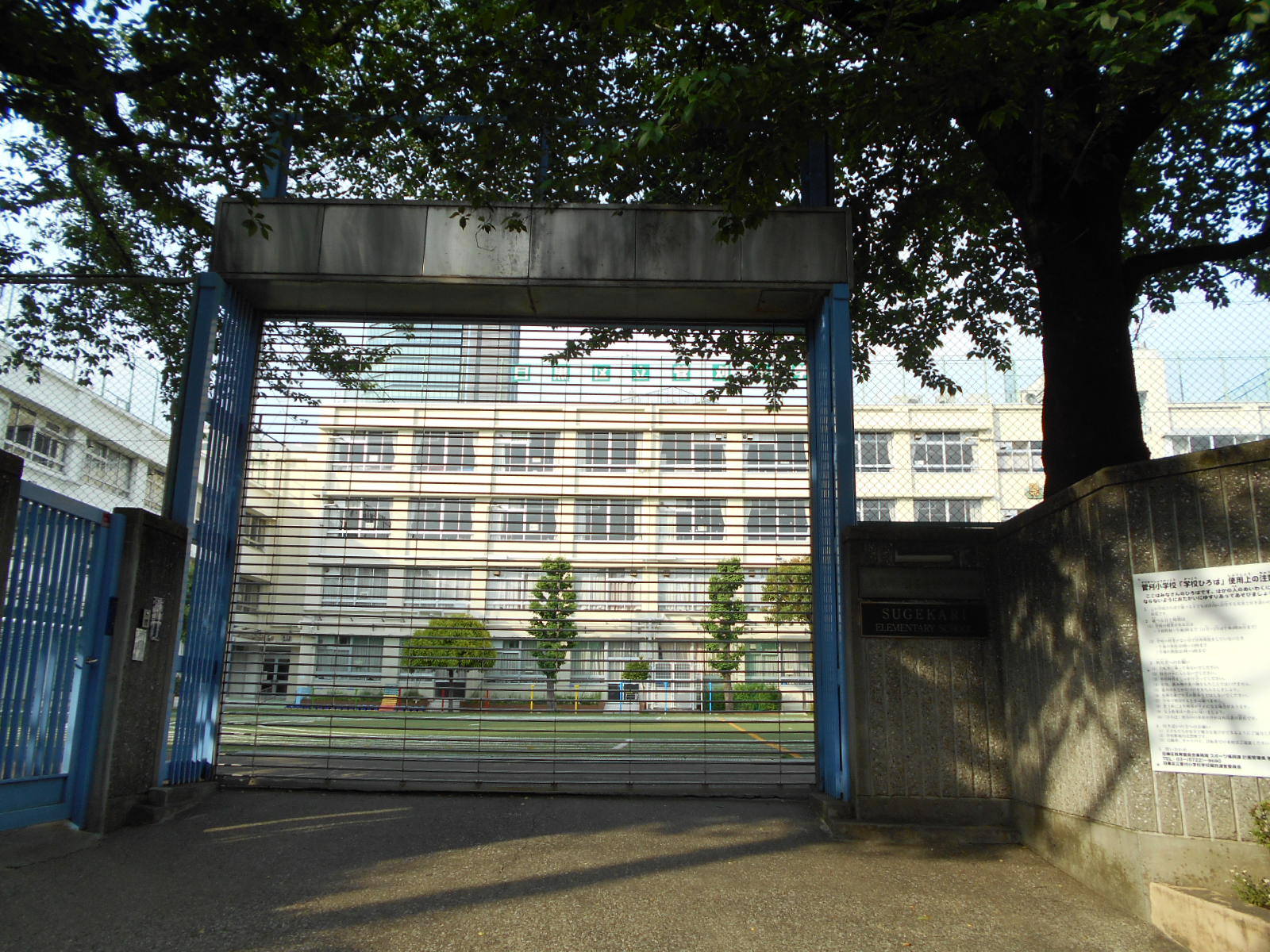
Sugekari Elementary School (菅刈小学校)
