= Jū Ayakura =

Japanese illustrator (born 1981)

Jū Ayakura (文倉十, Ayakura Jū; born December 7, 1981) is a Japanese illustrator primarily of light novels, although he has worked on two video games.

== Works ==
Novels

- Hanamori
- Ichigoiro Kinku
- The Ideal Sponger Life
- Imagine Hiseki
- Spice and Wolf

Games

- Angel Bullet
- Last Bullet
