= Exstetra =

2013 video game

- Nintendo 3DS box art
- Developer: Studio Saizensen
- Publisher: FuRyu
- Director: Toshio Akashi
- Artists: Tony Taka; Katsumi Enami
- Composer: Yoko Shimomura
- Platforms: Nintendo 3DS; PlayStation Vita; Microsoft Windows; Nintendo Switch; Nintendo Switch 2; PlayStation 5
- Release: 3DS, Vita: JP: November 7, 2013; Windows: WW: July 30, 2026; Switch, Switch 2, PS5: WW: September 3, 2026
- Genre: Role-playing game
- Mode: Single player

Exstetra (エクステトラ, Ekusutetora) is a Japanese role-playing video game developed by Studio Saizensen and published by FuRyu for the Nintendo 3DS and PlayStation Vita in 2013. An HD remaster with English support was released for Steam on July 30, 2026, marking the game's first official localization, followed by versions for the Nintendo Switch, Nintendo Switch 2 and PlayStation 5 on September 3, 2026.

== Gameplay ==
Exstetra is a traditional role-playing video game in the vein of the Tales series, but with a turn-based battle system. The game's central mechanic is the "kiss": the protagonist Ryoma awakens his companions as guardian knights by kissing them, an act that can also be performed between characters of the same sex. EXS energy is obtained by defeating monsters and is shared through kisses, allowing awakened knights to expend a gauge to perform EXS techniques; the accompanying mini-event cutscenes can be disabled in the options menu.

Weapons and armor can be strengthened with enhancement gems to a maximum level of ten, and can be "enchanted" with skills that activate situationally to increase a character's number of attack actions; activation rates scale with skill level.

== Story ==
The game's overall theme is "saving the world with a kiss". High school student Ryoma Narusawa is summoned, together with Mizuki Hoshino, to the otherworldly land of Ameizia, waking with no memory of his former life. The two are rescued by the priestess Selene, and when Ryoma kisses Mizuki she awakens as a fully armed guardian knight. Deemed by the priest Balam to be the prophesied saviour "Prisma" and his knight, the pair are tasked with rescuing the "knights' eggs" (Masaru, Shiho, Jin, Akari and Kotone), who appear alongside rainbows, and with collecting the books of prophecy. The group is shocked to learn that Ameizia has fused with their own Tokyo, now overgrown with vegetation.

As the prophecies near completion, the party is attacked by a Black Knight. The Black Knight's true identity is Elena, Selene's twin sister, who had been covertly monitoring her sister's suspicious behaviour. After Balam is fatally attacked, it emerges that Selene herself assaulted him to steal the hidden "Book of the Sky", revealing that both Balam and Selene had been lying, and that Elena too had been concealing a major fact from Ryoma.

== Development ==
The game was first announced in a May 2013 issue of Famitsu as a new role-playing game by FuRyu, the publisher of Unchained Blades. The game features character concept artwork from Shining series artist Tony Taka and Star Ocean: The Last Hope artist Katsumi Enami, and a main theme composed by Yoko Shimomura, known for Kingdom Hearts and Radiant Historia. The theme song is "with you", performed by the J-pop duo ClariS and written and composed by Mayuko Maruyama. Originally scheduled for release on October 17, 2013, the game was delayed to November 7 due to production schedule issues. Due to the expiration of ClariS's music license, the Nintendo 3DS version was delisted from digital sale on May 30, 2018.

An HD remaster was announced in May 2026. It was released worldwide through Steam on July 30, 2026, with English text support for the first time, while the Nintendo Switch, Nintendo Switch 2 and PlayStation 5 versions followed on September 3, 2026.

== Reception ==
Exstetra

Review score
Publication	Score
Famitsu	30/40

Four Famitsu reviewers gave Exstetra scores of 8, 8, 7 and 7, for a total score of 30/40, earning the game a place in the magazine's Silver Hall of Fame.

=== HD Remaster ===
The 2026 HD remaster received mixed to positive reviews. Siliconera gave the game a 6 out of 10, describing it as a "goofy indulgence" and a welcome localization of a "lost JRPG". The publication highlighted the strategic elements of the combat and the charming relationship system, but criticized the unexciting environments and some technical issues on PC, including controller compatibility quirks and fullscreen crashes.
