= Last Bullet =

2009 video game

- Last Bullet official box art
- Developer(s): FuRyu
- Publisher(s): FuRyu
- Artist(s): Jū Ayakura
- Platform(s): Nintendo DS
- Release: JP: April 23, 2009
- Genre(s): Adventure game
- Mode(s): Single-player

Last Bullet (ラストバレット, Rasuto Baretto) is a 2009 adventure game developed and published by FuRyu for the Nintendo DS. The game puts players in the role of a young female sniper, Karin Hibiki. The game's characters are designed by Jū Ayakura.

== Gameplay ==
The game is split into adventure and mission parts. During the adventure sequences, you speak to characters, solve puzzles, and advance through the storyline. These scenarios put Karin in a variety of situations, requiring that she change her clothes.

Each scenario has a mission in which players take control of Karin in sniper mode. Players are given success conditions at the start of the mission by Tsukasa Sakuma, a young teacher at Karin's school. Missions often give players multiple targets and limit rounds of fire. In addition, all missions include a set time limit; if this reaches zero, the game ends.

During sniping, you'll find yourself affected by weather conditions and even your own breathing. You can go into a concentration mode for a limited time, but this needs to be recharged before it can be used again.

== Plot ==
=== Story ===
Although bright and cheerful, Karin has a tragic past, besides suffering from her father's disappearance, she has lost her mother at an early age. With the help from friends, she has recovered, but the past tragedies are coming back to haunt her. A mysterious organization is aiming to take her life, and to survive, she entered the fray as a sniper.

Following hints and leads given to her by Tsukasa, a man who seems to know more than he is willing to divulge, Karin is forced to take the path to confront the truth behind her father's disappearance and the threats of the mysterious organization.

=== Characters ===
- Karin Hibiki (響 花梨): A first year student studying international culture at Aobai International College, she's good at sports and shooting. Both her father and mother died, leaving her depressed for a while, but now she's become bright and positive thanks to her surrounding friends. That's when she comes face to face with her destiny as a sniper. Karin is voiced by Yui Horie, a popular Japanese singer and voice actress.
- Daiki Sakai (境井 大貴): Karin's friend since junior high. He actually developed feelings for her, but the two ended up advancing to different colleges. His parents are divorced, and he lives with his mother.
- Tsukasa Sakuma (佐久間 司): A young teacher at Karin's school who's just returned from overseas. He's cool, and doesn't say unnecessary things. In addition to being a teacher, he has another important job, something that's related deeply with Karin.

== Reception ==
Famicom Tsūshin scored the game a 24 out of 40.
