= The Ideal Sponger Life =

Japanese light novel series

- Cover of the first light novel volume

理想のヒモ生活 (Risō no Himo Seikatsu)
- Genre: Isekai, romantic comedy
- Novel series
- Written by: Tsunehiko Watanabe
- Published by: Shōsetsuka ni Narō
- Original run: June 25, 2011 – present
- Light novel
- Written by: Tsunehiko Watanabe
- Illustrated by: Jū Ayakura
- Published by: Shufunotomo
- English publisher: NA: J-Novel Club
- Imprint: Hero Bunko
- Original run: September 28, 2012 – present
- Volumes: 15
- Manga
- Written by: Tsunehiko Watanabe
- Illustrated by: Neko Hinotsuki
- Published by: Kadokawa Shoten
- English publisher: NA: Seven Seas Entertainment
- Magazine: Young Ace
- Original run: February 3, 2017 – present
- Volumes: 26
- Anime television series

The Ideal Sponger Life (Japanese: 理想のヒモ生活, Hepburn: Risō no Himo Seikatsu) is a Japanese light novel series written by Tsunehiko Watanabe. The series originated on the Shōsetsuka ni Narō website in June 2011, before being published in print with illustrations by Jū Ayakura by Shufunotomo beginning in September 2012. A manga adaptation with illustrations by Neko Hinotsuki began serialization in the Young Ace magazine in February 2017. An anime television series adaptation has been announced.

== Synopsis ==
Zenjiro Yamai, an average office worker in modern Japan, suddenly finds himself summoned to another world. The person who summoned him, Queen Aura, wants him to marry her and leave his old life behind for a life of carefree extravagance as her prince consort. He is told that if he accepts, he only needs to provide her an heir. Other than that, he can laze around all day with no worries, and he will never have to work again as he did in his past. After accepting her offer, he finds himself in a magical world with nobles who have hidden agendas and ambitious schemes.

== Characters ==
Zenjiro Yamai (山井善治郎, Yamai Zenjiro)
A salaryman from Japan who got summoned to Another World and ended up marrying the Queen of Kingdom of Capua, Aura Capua, and became the prince consort. After that, his name changed to Zenjiro Capua. He eventually finds out that he is a user of the "Space-Time" Bloodline Magic.
Aura Capua (アウラ・カープァ, Aura Kāpua)
She is the Queen – and the last surviving royal – of the Kingdom of Capua, as well as the wife of Zenjiro Yamai. She is a user of the "Space-Time" Bloodline Magic. At first, she married Zenjiro for political reasons, but she has come to genuinely love him.
Freya Uppasala (フレア・ウップサーラ, Furea Uppusāra)
She is the first Princess of the Kingdom of Uppasala and the Captain of "Glasir's Leaf", the eighth ship belonging to the Kingdom of Uppasala's Navy. She came to Capua in search of a new trade route.
Inesl (イネス, Inesu)
She is works as one of the head maids supervising the cleaning staff of the Inner Palace of the Kingdom of Capua. She is highly trusted by both Queen Aura and Zenjiro. Whenever Zenjiro takes trips, she is assigned to accompany him as an aide.
Fabio Deubashe (ファビオ・デウバジェ, Fabio Deubaje)
He works as the head secretary and as a consultant for Queen Aura. He is not afraid to give his honest and harsh opinion, even to the Queen.
Victoria Kronkvist (ヴィクトリア・クロンクヴィスト, Vikutoria Kuronkuvisuto) / Skaji
A highly capable warrior from the Kingdom of Uppasala who serves as the attendant and bodyguard of Freya Uppasala. She is so strong that she single-handedly defeated an alpha wyvern.
Pujol Guillén (プジョル・ギジェン, Pujoru Gijen)
A General in the Army of the Kingdom of Capua and a highly ambitious man with both skills and strength to support his goal. Also a former marriage candidate of Aura Capua.
Natalio Maldonado (ナタリオ・マルドナド, Natario Marudonado)
A palace knight working in the Kingdom of Capua. After Zenjiro gives him a wyvern bow, he swears his loyalty to him and is appointed as his personal knight.
Xavier Gaziel (チャビエル・ガジール, Chabieru Gajīru)
He is the third and youngest son of Margrave Miguel Gaziel, the only surviving heir of the Gaziel family since the death of his two older brothers during the Great War.

== Media ==
=== Light novel ===
Written by Tsunehiko Watanabe, the series began publication on the novel posting website Shōsetsuka ni Narō on June 25, 2011. The series was later acquired by Shufunotomo, who began publishing the series in print with illustrations by Jū Ayakura on September 28, 2012. It was one of the first batch of works published by Hero Bunko imprint. As of December 2023, fifteen volumes have been released.

In November 2020, J-Novel Club announced that they licensed the series for English publication.

==== Volumes ====
No.	Original release date	Original ISBN	English release date	English ISBN
1	September 28, 2012	978-4-07-284078-8	January 27, 2021	978-1-71-836402-8
Prologue – In Another World for His First Weekend Off in Six Months; Intermission 1 – The Queens's Private Discussion; Chapter 1 – A Temporary Return; Chapter 2 – From Preparations to Transfer; Chapter 3 – Marriage, and Starting Married Life; Chapter 4 – The Mysteries of the Soul of Language; Chapter 5 – Peaceful Times Passes; Appendix – The Lord and Maids' Game Battle
2	November 30, 2012	978-4-07-284084-9	July 2, 2021	978-1-71-836404-2
Prologue – Their Respective Speculations; Chapter 1 – Societal Debut; Chapter 2 – Envoy From the Twin Kingdoms; Chapter 3 – The Royal Conception; Chapter 4 – Secret Missive From the Twin Kingdoms; Chapter 5 – A Step Outside; Chapter 6 – A Duel Called Negotiations; Chapter 7 – Enacting the Secret Treaty; Epilogue – The Royal Birth; Appendix – The Lord and Maids' Joint Development
3	March 29, 2013	978-4-07-288700-4	June 18, 2021	978-1-71-836406-6
Prologue – Beginning of the Second Year; Chapter 1 – Problem on the Salt Road; Chapter 2 – Activity in the Capital; Chapter 3 – The Salt Road; Chapter 4 – Zenjirou's Daily Life; Chapter 5 – An Afternoon Confrontation, an Evening Lecture, and a Night's Relaxation; Chapter 6 – Set in Motion; Appendix – The Lord and Maids' Culture Clash
4	August 31, 2013	978-4-07-292190-6	August 24, 2021	978-1-71-836408-0
Prologue – The Journey of the Prince and Princess; Chapter 1 – The Queen, the Prince Consort, the Prince, and the Princess; Intermission 1 – The Hero and the Youth; Chapter 2 – Manipulator and Manipulate; Intermission 2 – Fight of the Drake Marksmen Knights; Chapter 3 – Zenjirou's Blunder; Intermission 3 – A Quiet Road; Chapter 4 – Prince's Secrets Revealed, and Prince's Secrets Exposed; Chapter 5 – A Goal Confirmed; Appendix – The Lord and Maids' Mutual Aid
5	April 28, 2014	978-4-07-296354-8	November 11, 2021	978-1-71-836410-3
Prologue – A Ship Sighted; Chapter 1 – The Prince Consort Far From Home; Chapter 2 – Princess of the Sea, Freya; Intermission 1 – The Mountain Hunt; Chapter 3 – The Boundary Between Kindness and Ambition; Intermission 2 – Lingering Traces and Vanished Drakes; Chapter 4 – Where the Chain Arrived; Chapter 5 – A Predicament Born from Kindness; Chapter 6 – Final Steps Towards Subjugation; Epilogue; Appendix – The Lord and Maids' Special Training
6	November 29, 2014	978-4-07-410241-9	February 7, 2022	978-1-71-836412-7
Prologue – New Year's Celebrations in Capua; Chapter 1 – The General's Marriage; Chapter 2 – Triumph in the Capital; Chapter 3 – Princess Freya's Intentions; Intermission – The Twin Kingdom's Actions; Chapter 4 – Preparations Both Practical and Emotional; Epilogue – Heading for the Gaziel March; Appendix – The Lord and Maids' Turnover
7	September 30, 2015	978-4-07-403086-6	July 28, 2022	978-1-71-836414-1
Prologue – The Journey Out; Chapter 1 – Arrival; Chapter 2 – The Wedding; Intermission 1 – The Queen in the Capital; Chapter 3 – A Trifling Spark; Intermission 2 – The Queen's Faith; Chapter 4 – A Duel of Words; Chapter 5 – The Moment of Settlement; Chapter 6 – The Various Conclusions; Epilogue – The Return; Appendix – The Lord and Maids' Game Maintenance
8	June 30, 2016	978-4-07-417935-0	September 29, 2022	978-1-71-836416-5
Prologue – Zenjirou's Return; Chapter 1 – Nilda Gaziel – 1; Intermission 1 – The Queen in the Capital; Chapter 2 – Nilda Gaziel – 2; Chapter 3 – Freya Uppasala – 1; Intermission 2 – Lucinda's Influence; Chapter 4 – Freya Uppasala – 2; Chapter 5 – Aura Capua; Epilogue – Lucretia Broglie; Appendix – The Lord and Maids' Electric Maintenance
9	May 31, 2017	978-4-07-424639-7	December 2, 2022	978-1-71-836418-9
Prologue – Sleeping Alone; Chapter 1 – Audience; Chapter 2 – A Private Meeting; Intermission – A Strategy Meeting; Chapter 3 – Coming Home and Going Home; Chapter 4 – Secret Moves in Earnest; Chapter 5 – Words of Gratitude; Epilogue – Return After a Month; Appendix – The Lord and Maids' Spread of Contamination
10	December 28, 2017	978-4-07-429074-1	February 3, 2023	978-1-71-836420-2
Prologue – Time with His Son; Chapter 1 – Princess Freya's Crisis; Chapter 2 – Contract of the Ivory Cathedral; Intermission – Lucretia's Decision; Chapter 3 – Complicated Negotiations; Chapter 4 – An Unplanned Call Home; Chapter 5 – Reconciliation and Return; Epilogue – The Next Steps; Appendix – The Lord and Maids' Home Renovation
11	July 31, 2018	978-4-07-433868-9	April 6, 2023	978-1-71-836422-6
Prologue – Prime Minister, Marshal, and Duke; Chapter 1 – Ambition, Trade, and Safety; Chapter 2 – The Old Sage, the Magic Researcher, and the Watcher; Chapter 3 – The Isolation Barrier and Static Flame; Chapter 4 – The Second Birth, the Three Promises, and the Four Magic Tools; Chapter 5 – Birth, Trip, and Departure; Epilogue – The Queen, Prince, and Backroom Deals; Appendix – The Lord and Maids' Long Separation
12	April 30, 2019	978-4-07-437228-7	June 8, 2023	978-1-71-836424-0
Prologue – Goat Island; Chapter 1 – The Three Yans; Chapter 2 – The One Who Pleads and the One Who Listens; Chapter 3 – The Husaria; Intermission – The One-Eyed Mercenary's Battle; Chapter 4 – Awaiting Victory; Chapter 5 – Victory Party; Epilogue – Departure; Appendix – The Lord and Maids' Reconnaissance Duty
13	March 30, 2020	978-4-07-442815-1	August 17, 2023	978-1-71-836426-4
Prologue – Valaskjálf; Chapter 1 – Meeting in Person; Chapter 2 – The Rite of Age; Intermission – Prince Eric's Visit to Capua; Chapter 3 – Days of Searching and Private Talks; Intermission – A Temporary Return; Chapter 4 – The Windhammer; Chapter 5 – A Second Marriage; Epilogue – The Second in the Inner Palace; Appendix – The Lord and Maids' Staff Reassignment
14	September 30, 2021	978-4-07-447913-9	November 23, 2023	978-1-71-836428-8
Prologue – The Founding Myth; Chapter 1 – Concubine Debut; Chapter 2 – Visit to the Twin Kingdoms; Chapter 3 – An Artisan's Aspiration; Chapter 4 – The Next Steps; Chapter 5 – The Gray Cat's Invite; Epilogue – A Private Discussion in the Inner Palace, or: A Spoiled Child's Tantrum; Appendix – The Maids and Maids' South-North Exchange
15	December 28, 2023	978-4-07-456480-4	May 29, 2025	978-1-71-836430-1
Prologue – Those Left Behind; Chapter 1 – Utgard; Intermission – Private Discussion Between King and Prince; Chapter 2 – Schemes and Maneuvering; Chapter 3 – Ability and Preference; Intermission 2 – Mercenary in Hiding; Chapter 4 – The Queen Plots, the Prince Consort Travels; Chapter 5 – A Planned Miracle; Epilogue – The Spark of War; Appendix – The Lord and Maids' Skill Guidance

=== Manga ===
A manga adaptation, illustrated by Neko Hinotsuki, began serialization in Kadokawa Shoten's Young Ace magazine on February 3, 2017. As of July 2026, the series' individual chapters have been collected into twenty-six tankōbon volumes.

In March 2018, Seven Seas Entertainment announced that they licensed the series for English publication.

==== Volumes ====
No.	Original release date	Original ISBN	English release date	English ISBN
1	July 25, 2017	978-4-04-106001-8	March 12, 2019	978-1-64-275043-0
Chapter 1: I Spent My First Two Days Off in Half a Year in Another World; Chapter 2: Temporary Return; Chapter 3: The Wedding; Chapter 4: And Thus Our Newlywed Life Begins!; Chapter 5: Suddenly, a Private Tutor!
2	December 4, 2017	978-4-04-106393-4	June 25, 2019	978-1-64-275128-4
Chapter 6: A Lecture on Magic; Chapter 7: A Gorgeous Night; Chapter 8: How to Refuse a Gift; Chapter 9: Envoy From the Twin Kingdoms; Chapter 10: The Price of Marbles; Original Short Story: The Girls' After-Party
3	June 4, 2018	978-4-04-106841-0	September 17, 2019	978-1-64-275696-8
Chapter 11: Zenjiro's Selfishness; Chapter 12: A Certain Rumor; Chapter 13: Our Own Battlefields; Chapter 14: Words of the Oath; Chapter 15: This Is How A Sponger Lives; Original Short Story: The Prince's Name
4	November 2, 2018	978-4-04-107482-4	December 10, 2019	978-1-64-275742-2
Chapter 16: The Second Year Begins; Chapter 17: Xavier's Battle; Chapter 18: Hidden Magic; Chapter 19: The Swarming Raptor Menace; Original Short Story: The Summoned Princess
5	February 4, 2019	978-4-04-107829-7	April 20, 2020	978-1-64-505236-4
Chapter 20: Visit from the Sharou Royal Family; Chapter 21: Top Secret; Chapter 22: Affinity; Chapter 23: A Visit to the Sickly Prince; Original Short Story: The Life of a Queen's Loyal Subject
6	June 4, 2019	978-4-04-108233-1	September 8, 2020	978-1-64-505742-0
Chapter 24: The Prince's Secret; Chapter 25: Southern Magic, Northern Technology; Chapter 26: Port Town of Valentia; Chapter 27: Negotiations with the Princess; Original Short Story: Birds Twitter in the Palace
7	October 4, 2019	978-4-04-108704-6	December 8, 2020	978-1-64-505816-8
Chapter 28: A Dinner of Great Import; Chapter 29: The Responsibility Lies With Me; Chapter 30: Balancing the Wage of War; Chapter 31: Warrior of the North; Chapter 32: Never Again...
8	February 4, 2020	978-4-04-108705-3	March 9, 2021	978-1-64-827083-3
Chapter 33: Husband and Wife – A Revealing Conversation; Chapter 34: A Shake-up at the Welcoming Party; Chapter 35: Aura vs. Freya; Chapter 36: Zenjuri's Decision
9	June 4, 2020	978-4-04-109476-1	September 14, 2021	978-1-64-827310-0
Chapter 37: The Second Daughter of House Gaziel; Chapter 38: Lucinda's Constraint; Chapter 39: The Problem Child's Scheme; Chapter 40: Irreconcilable Differences
10	November 4, 2020	978-4-04-109463-1	January 18, 2022	978-1-64-827480-0
Chapter 41: Secret Plan; Chapter 42: The Light Is in His Hands; Chapter 43: Pinto in a Pinch; Chapter 44: And Now, Back to the Capital
11	March 4, 2021	978-4-04-109464-8	June 21, 2022	978-1-63-858215-1
Chapter 45: A Joyous Happoenstance; Chapter 46: Amanda's Advice; Chapter 47: The Image of Success; Chapter 48: His Goal is Grand Marshal
12	July 2, 2021	978-4-04-111461-2	November 22, 2022	978-1-63-858621-0
Chapter 49: Raise the Anchor; Chapter 50: A Formal Audience; Chapter 51: Successor to the Throne; Chapter 52: A Charming Representative
13	December 3, 2021	978-4-04-111462-9	April 11, 2023	978-1-63858-845-0
Chapter 53: A Kingdom Full of Confrontations; Chapter 54: A Storm Comes; Chapter 55: Pursuing Ideals; Chapter 56: Imperial Wrath
14	April 4, 2022	978-4-04-112486-4	August 22, 2023	978-1-68579-507-8
Chapter 57: A Vital Business Negotiation; Chapter 58: The Royal Family's Decision; Chapter 59: My Home That Soothes My Heart; Chapter 60: The Capuan Royal Family
15	September 2, 2022	978-4-04-112628-8	January 30, 2024	979-8-88843-132-0
Chapter 61: A Delivery From the Queen; Chapter 62: Behind the Negotiations; Chapter 63: An Unexpected Reunion; Chapter 64: Grasping the Desired Results
16	December 28, 2022	978-4-04-113261-6	June 4, 2024	979-8-88843-596-0
Chapter 65: Artifact; Chapter 66: The Seed That Has Been Exchanged; Chapter 67: Those Who Rule the World; Chapter 68: Defence Strategy
17	June 2, 2023	978-4-04-113620-1	November 19, 2024	979-8-89160-059-1
Chapter 69: Change; Chapter 70: A Voyage into the Unknown; Chapter 71: Quest to the Future; Chapter 72: Djinniya
18	September 4, 2023	978-4-04-114032-1	April 22, 2025	979-8-89160-543-5
Chapter 73: Exciting Work; Chapter 74: The King's Decision; Chapter 75: The Last Passenger; Chapter 76: Setting Sail
19	February 2, 2024	978-4-04-114445-9	August 19, 2025	979-8-89373-365-5
Chappter 77: The Rolling of the Waves; Chappter 78: Various Lines of Work; Chappter 79: The Coming Storm; Chappter 80: The Who Believe
20	June 4, 2024	978-4-04-114998-0	December 23, 2025	979-8-89373-761-5
Chapter 81: The Direction of the March; Chapter 82: Strategy Meeting; Chapter 83: The Flame That Burns in One's Heart; Chapter 84: The Die Has Been Thrown
21	October 4, 2024	978-4-04-115360-4	April 28, 2026	979-8-89561-189-0
Chapter 85: Confrontation; Chapter 86: Desired Things; Chapter 87: Results of Battle; Chapter 88: Let's Be Off
22	February 4, 2025	978-4-04-115782-4	August 25, 2026	979-8-89561-926-1
Chapter 89: Welcome; Chapter 90: No Backing Down; Chapter 91: A Warrior's Disposition; Chapter 92: Departing for the Future
23	June 4, 2025	978-4-04-116169-2	December 8, 2026	979-8-89765-549-6
24	November 4, 2025	978-4-04-116684-0	April 13, 2027	979-8-89863-391-2
25	March 3, 2026	978-4-04-117125-7	—	—
26	July 3, 2026	978-4-04-117474-6	—	—
27	December 4, 2026	978-4-04-117957-4	—	—

=== Anime ===
An anime adaptation was announced on December 15, 2023. It was later revealed to be a television series.

== Reception ==
Theron Martin from Anime News Network praised the treatment of the series' sensitive subject matter, though he also criticized the world building.

By October 2021, the series had 2.7 million copies in circulation. The series later had 4.7 million copies in circulation by December 2023.
