= Jewelpet: Magical Dance in Style Deco! =

Video game for the Nintendo 3DS

Jewelpet: Magical Dance in Style☆Deco!
- Official boxart
- Developer: FuRyu
- Publisher: FuRyu
- Artists: Yuko Yamaguchi; Tomoko Miyakawa
- Series: Jewelpet
- Platform: Nintendo 3DS
- Release: JP: November 8, 2012
- Genres: Rhythmic; Music
- Modes: Single-player, multiplayer

Jewelpet: Magical Dance in Style☆Deco! (ジュエルペット 魔法でおしゃれにダンス☆デコ～!, Juerupetto: Mahō de oshare ni dansu ☆ deko~!) is a rhythmic music game developed and published by FuRyu. It is the second Jewelpet game for the Nintendo 3DS after Jewelpet Magical Rhythm Yay! and overall the fifth game in the Handheld series. It was released on November 8, 2012, and contains some elements from the fourth anime series, Jewelpet Kira☆Deco!.

== Gameplay ==
Official Screenshot of the bottom half of the game. Like the first 3 games in the series, Magical Dance in Style Deco! retains the gameplay on touching the flowers appearing on screen to make music while collecting jewels

The gameplay of Jewelpet: Magical Dance in Style☆Deco! adapts both the musical elements of the first two Nintendo DS games as well as the life simulation elements of the third game like the previous series, but has updated mechanics. Like the previous games, the game is a cross between a music and life simulation, with the gameplay is done by using 3DS's stylus, similar to Osu! Tatakae! Ouendan. The player must first name itself and chose one of the 10 Jewelpets in the start. Then the game takes the player to the in-world screen on where the player must go to a specific location using the stylus to access a music session, or talk to NPCs. The game's music session requires the use of the stylus, and the instrument the player chose before the session. The player must touch the jewel flowers appearing on the screen to successfully synchronize with the music and do special combos. In each successful clear, the player collect jewels to unlock new items and instruments as well as new Jewelpets. Each clear depends on the ranking the player gets on how experienced it is on playing the game.

=== New features ===
The storyline of the game is loosely based on the anime, with a few references from the fourth series, Jewelpet Kira☆Deco!. The new dress-up feature is now included for customizing the player's Jewelpet as well as a fashion contest to showcase the Jewelpet in its clothing and compete with others for the player to win. Also, minigames from the third game are implemented such as catching dandelion seeds or gardening. The Augmented Reality feature returns from the fourth game, allowing players to view their Jewelpets using the 3DS's camera and the AR cards. Unlike the first 3DS game, players can now view two Jewelpets at a time using two AR cards.

== Playable Jewelpets ==
Name	Animal type	Gender	Jewel
Ruby	Japanese White rabbit (ja)	Female	Ruby
Garnet	Persian cat	Female	Garnet
Sapphie	Cavalier King Charles Spaniel	Female	Sapphire
Labra	Polar bear	Female	Labradorite
Angela	Alpaca	Female	Angelite
Sango	Tabby cat	Female	Coral
Peridot	Papillon	Female	Peridot
Luna	Netherland Dwarf	Female	Moonstone
Milky	Chihuahua	Female	Milky quartz
Diana	Munchkin	Female	Diamond

== Development ==
An official teaser site was opened by FuRyu to announce the second game for the 3DS during August 2012. Later on after the announcement, Famitsu gave an in-depth update to the game, stating the game will have updated game mechanics from previous games, like the return of the minigames from the third game Jewelpet Let's play Together in the Room of Magic! and the inclusion of the dress-up feature for customizing the player's Jewelpet. In the new site update, the developers revealed 10 playable Jewelpets in the game.
