= Lost Dimension =

2014 video game

- PlayStation Vita cover
- Developer: Lancarse
- Publishers: JP: FuRyu; NA: Atlus USA; EU: NIS America; WW: Ghostlight (PC)
- Producer: Hiroyuki Abe
- Designers: Takeshi Oga; Yuu Yamashita; Makoto Tsuchibayashi
- Writer: Jun Kumagai
- Platforms: PlayStation 3; PlayStation Vita; Windows
- Release: PlayStation 3, PS Vita: JP: August 7, 2014; NA: July 28, 2015; AU: August 27, 2015; EU: August 28, 2015; Windows: WW: October 30, 2017
- Genre: Tactical role-playing
- Mode: Single-player

Lost Dimension (Note: Japanese: ロストディメンション, Hepburn: Rosuto Dimenshon) is a 2014 video game developed by Lancarse originally for the PlayStation 3 and PlayStation Vita. It is a tactical role-playing video game with visual novel-like elements, where the choices of the player determine the fate of the game's story, as well as its characters. The game's protagonist is 18-year-old Sho Kasugai, a member of S.E.A.L.E.D., an organisation tasked with stopping a mysterious man named "The End", who wants to destroy the world. A Windows version, published by Ghostlight, was released in October 2017.

== Gameplay ==
Lost Dimension is a tactical role-playing video game. The characters climb the mysterious five-floor Pillar, in which they encounter a number of enemies. During battles, the characters attack enemies as a group, with each character having unique attacks and abilities. The game's "Assist" feature automatically occurs when an ally is nearby when the player attacks. Each character also has a unique "Gift" special ability, and by obtaining "Gift exp" in battle, new abilities can be unlocked. The "Defer" feature allows the player to pass up their turn to an ally; this can be used to allow the strongest party member to continue to attack, and take advantage of the characters' strengths and weaknesses. There is also a "Berserk" status effect; when a character loses all their sanity points, they become berserk. Berserk characters gain a boost in attack damage but will hit both allies and enemies alike.

Lost Dimension also has a visual novel-like system where the choices of the player determine the fate of the game's story, as well as its characters. Of the game's eleven playable characters, five are traitors; one is potentially revealed per floor. The characters which are traitors are randomly selected, and vary from game to game, although the main character is never a traitor. The player must use deductive skills to find out who the traitor each floor is. During the "Judgement" phase of the game, the remaining characters vote on whom to "erase", including the player. It is best for the player to successfully identify the traitor and convince others to vote his way, though if the player chooses wrongly or is ineffective at persuasion, an innocent character will be killed instead. To determine who the traitor is, protagonist Sho Kasugai uses his psychic ability, "Vision", to look into the future to obtain hints on the traitor's identity. The player can also look into the thoughts of the different characters, as well as question them. The player can rig teams sent out on missions to attempt to deduce who the potential suspects are, and use "Vision" for confirmation or denial. As the characters climb the pillar, five team members total will be eliminated in Judgment by the endgame, one on the first three floors, and two on the fourth floor.

== Story ==
Lost Dimension takes place in the near future, with the world in ruin. The game's protagonist is 18 year-old Sho Kasugai, a member of S.E.A.L.E.D., a special group of 17-to-18 year olds with psychic abilities tasked with investigating a giant pillar that appeared out of nowhere. Sho has a special ability called "Vision", which grants him the ability to foresee events before they happen, and after he used it to save people from a mass destruction, he was chosen to be a member of S.E.A.L.E.D. The main antagonist is a mysterious terrorist known as "The End". The End has caused massacres and destruction that kill over 2 billion people, and is the reason why the United Nations put together S.E.A.L.E.D., in order to kill him. The End's seeming goal is to destroy the world, and considers the fight against S.E.A.L.E.D. to be a bizarre game.

Alongside the precognitive Sho, the other members of S.E.A.L.E.D. are: the super-strong Mana Kawai, the psychic Marco Barbato, the telepathic Yoko Tachibana, the resonant Zenji Maeda, the magnetic Toya Orbert, the pyrokinetic Himeno Akatsuki, the psychometric George Jackman, the healing Sojiro Sagara, the levitating Nagi Shishiouka, and the teleporting Agito Yuuki.

As the members of S.E.A.L.E.D arrive at the base of the pillar, The End tampers with their memories; they can't recall how they got there, or much of their younger pasts. The party learns that the Pillar is a place that connects between dimensions; The End claims to be from a different plane of existence. The group must now go up the floors of the Pillar; but at the end of each floor, the group is forced to vote off one of the party's traitors in order to succeed. Sho must deduce, during the time he spends fighting alongside his teammate, who the traitor is and also encourage the others to vote them off.

The game has a number of endings. If somehow Sho is "voted off" in the Erasure process, it is an immediate game over, although this is very unlikely if the player is not explicitly angling for it. If Sho arrives at the top of the Pillar with 1-4 traitors accompanying him, then the player, before they can face The End, must face off against those traitors and then face off against The End (albeit with a significantly smaller party). However, if Sho arrives with 5 traitors (having erased only the 5 innocents), then the player will receive a bad ending where The End mocks Sho, claims he will possess Sho in the past, and that he and the other traitors would save "their" world.

In the normal ending, any undetected traitors defect and attack at the top of the Pillar. After Sho and his remaining comrades defeat them (if there are any traitors), they defeat The End in a final battle. The End claims that the traitors were merely trying to save the world, same as the other members of S.E.A.L.E.D, and that his own goal was simply to force Sho to suffer, not to destroy or save any world. He accuses Sho of sentencing him to death, and causing the deaths of millions, but refuses to elaborate and has a strangely unfazed attitude upon defeat.

After completing the game on a "New Game Plus" (at least the second playthrough) where Sho has maximized his bonds with all of the teammates (bond levels carry over to future playthroughs), a True Ending is unlocked which explains the backstory of the game. Ten years earlier, Earth was facing eventual destruction from a meteor, and scientists implanted powerful "fate materia" into 12 young children in an attempt to clone a new dimension where this disaster would be averted - these were the 11 members of S.E.A.L.E.D., and The End. This materia was the source of the psychics' powers in-game. However, the cloned dimension still seemed destined to destruction; the meteor was in it as well. Six of the fate materia were materia of change, and six of constancy. The effects canceled out. A young Sho was asked to divide the group using his precognitive powers and send only those who would allow a new fate to the new dimension - those with the change materia. Sho and the random five allies had the "change" materia, while The End and the random five traitors were sentenced to stay in the doomed world. Due to The End's ability to travel between dimensions, each of the different permutations for the allies in a playthrough represent a different dimension where Sho chose different allies (but always chose The End as one of those to leave behind). The End rigged the whole erasure system to force a more mature Sho to suffer the weight of his actions in knowingly sending a comrade to their death, and to relive his choices from ten years earlier. After being defeated by the party, The End makes peace with Sho; with the help of his erasure machine and Sho's growing powers forged from the bonds of his allies, Sho destroys the meteor and saves the "old" world, The End, and the 5 "traitors".

== Development ==
The game is developed by Lancarse, developer of Etrian Odyssey and Shin Megami Tensei: Strange Journey, and published by FuRyu, developer of Unchained Blades. The game's story is written by Jun Kumagai, who has worked on the scripts of the Persona 3 movies, as well as a few episodes of Persona 4: The Animation, with Takeshi Oga being head of tower designs and character designs being provided by Yuu Yamashita and Makoto Tsuchibayashi. The game's producer is Hiroyuki Abe. The game was revealed on April 17, 2014, and scheduled for release on August 7, 2014, in Japan, with players who pre-order the game receiving bonus content such as an alternate costume, as well as an additional quest. Select retailers also offer additional items. A demo of Lost Dimension was released on July 30, 2014, and is free to download.

In 2017, UK-based localization company Ghostlight announced that it would be porting the game to Windows, and it was released there in October 2017

== Reception ==
Reception

Aggregate score
| Aggregator | Score |
|---|---|
| Metacritic | (PS3) 71/100 (VITA) 72/100 |

Review scores
| Publication | Score |
|---|---|
| Computer Games Magazine | 6.5/10 |
| Destructoid | 8/10 |
| GameSpot | 7/10 |
| Hardcore Gamer | 3.5/5 |
| IGN | 7/10 |
| Polygon | 7.5/10 |
| Push Square | 7/10 |
| RPGamer | 3.5/5 |
| RPGFan | 80/100 |

Lost Dimension has a score of 72% on Metacritic.

All four Famitsu reviewers gave the PlayStation 3 version of Lost Dimension a score of 8, for a total of 32/40, while the PlayStation Vita version received scores of 8, 8, 8 and 9, for a total of 33/40. It has a Metacritic score of 72% The Vita version sold 3,868 copies during its first week on sale in Japan, ranking 19th for all video game sales for that week, while the PS3 version failed to enter the top 20 sales chart.

IGN awarded it a score of 7 out of 10, saying "Lost Dimension has interesting characters and smart combat, but lacks a compelling story."
