= Kyu Asakura House =

Coordinates: 35.6475289°N 139.7008958°E

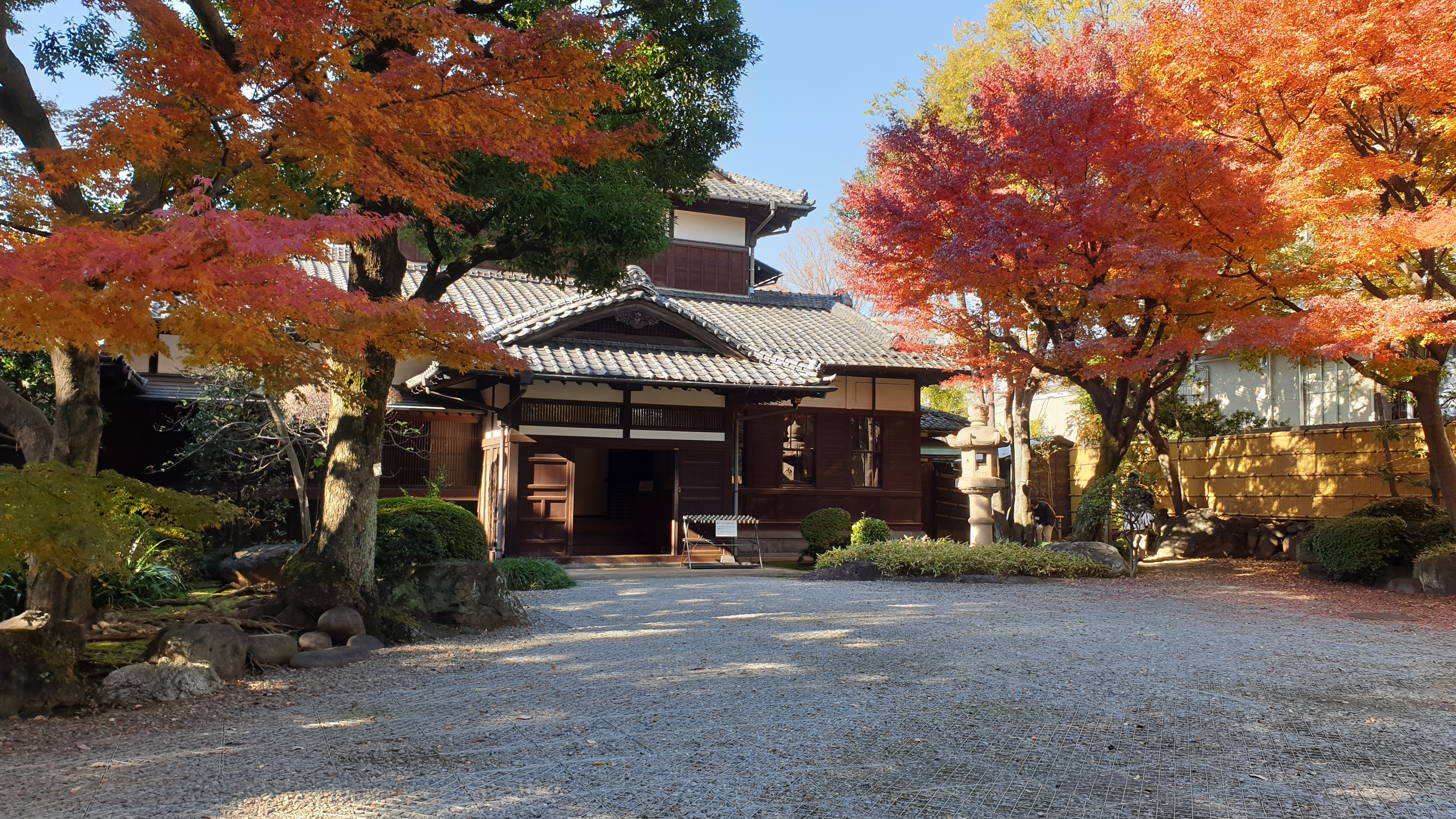
Kyu Asakura House.

The Kyu Asakura House (旧朝倉家住宅, Kyū Asakura Jūtaku; literally "Old Asakura House") is a historic house located in Shibuya, Tokyo. The house includes a large garden reminiscent of roji, a kind of garden that surrounds a teahouse.

== History ==
The house was constructed in 1919 by Torajiro Asakura as his house, and a place for him to conduct business. It survived the Great Kantō earthquake and the Second World War. Fumihiko Maki, an architect working on a neighboring mall, insisted on the preservation of the house, citing it as a good example of Taisho era architecture.
