= Unchained Blades =

2011 video game

- Developer: FuRyu
- Publisher: Xseed Games: JP: FuRyu
- Director: Toshio Akashi
- Writer: Takashi Hino
- Composer: Tsutomu Narita
- Platforms: Nintendo 3DS, PlayStation Portable
- Release: JP: July 14, 2011; NA: June 26, 2012 (PSP); NA: January 3, 2013 (3DS)
- Genre: Role-playing game
- Mode: Single-player

Unchained Blades, titled UnchainBlades ReXX in Japan, is a 2011 dungeon crawler role-playing video game developed by FuRyu and published by Xseed Games for the Nintendo 3DS and PlayStation Portable.

== Gameplay ==
The game is played as a dungeon crawler role-playing video game, similar to Wizardry, but with a greater emphasis on story. The purpose of the game is to direct the game's party through mazes and labyrinths while defeating opposing monster parties. A party can contain up to four characters. Additionally, it is possible to recruit enemy monsters into the player's party to assist them, and each character is allowed to have four monsters support them, allowing for a party size of up to twenty characters.

== Development ==
=== Creation ===
Many veterans in Japanese video game design contributed to the original development of the game. The game's director is Toshio Akashi, who previously worked on Lunar, and the scenario designer is Takashi Hino, who previously worked on Grandia. Longtime Final Fantasy musical contributor Nobuo Uematsu also contributed music for the game, although most of the game's music was done by upcoming, Tsutomu Narita, who works with Uematsu. Additionally, each of the game's main thirteen characters were each drawn by different artists from different anime and manga background.

The Japanese release was originally intended to be June 23, 2011, but in April, it was delayed to July 14, 2011.

The Nintendo 3DS and PlayStation Portable versions are almost identical, the differences being mainly visual. The 3DS version is the only one that features stereoscopic 3D graphics. Additionally, the placement of the overhead map of the levels is different platforms; for the 3DS, it's on the second, bottom screen, where on the PSP, which lacks a second screen, it is merely layered over the main screen, with the option to toggle it on or off.

Xseed Games originally teased the localization of the video game through a guessing game through its Twitter. Three pictures were released as hints to the game's title; a Tyrannosaurus rex, a blade of grass, and a still from the movie Ghost's famous pottery wheel scene. This was in reference to the three words, in reverse order, of the game's Japanese title Unchained Blade Rexx. The game's localization was officially confirmed through the April 2012 issue of Nintendo Power.

== Reception and sales ==
Reception

Aggregate score
Aggregator	Score	
Aggregator	3DS	PSP
Metacritic	65/100	61/100

Review scores
Publication	Score	
Publication	3DS	PSP
Destructoid	N/A	4/10
Famitsu	31/40	31/40
GameRevolution	2.5/5	N/A
GameZone	N/A	3.5/10
IGN	8/10	N/A
Nintendo Life	8/10	N/A
Nintendo World Report	5/10	N/A
Polygon	6/10	N/A
PlayStation: The Official Magazine	N/A	4/10

The game received "mixed or average" reviews on both platforms according to the review aggregation website Metacritic. In Japan, four critics from Famitsu gave the game a total score of 31 out of 40.

Both versions of the game charted in their first week of release in Japan; the PlayStation Portable version charted at seventh place with 18,256 copies sold, while the Nintendo 3DS version charted at twentieth place with 5,592 copies sold.

== Sequel ==
A sequel titled Unchained Blades Exiv was developed and released on November 29, 2012 in Japan for the PlayStation Portable and Nintendo 3DS. Xseed Games, who localized the original into English, stated that it was "not likely" that they would pursue translating the sequel.
