= Higashiyama, Meguro =

District of Meguro-ku in Tokyo, Japan

Higashiyama (東山, lit. "east mountain") is a district in Meguro, Tokyo. It has numbered blocks from one (一丁目) to three (三丁目). Its postal code is 153–0043.
