= Uguisudanichō, Shibuya =

District in Shibuya, Tokyo, Japan

Uguisudanichō 鶯谷町
- Neighborhood in Shibuya
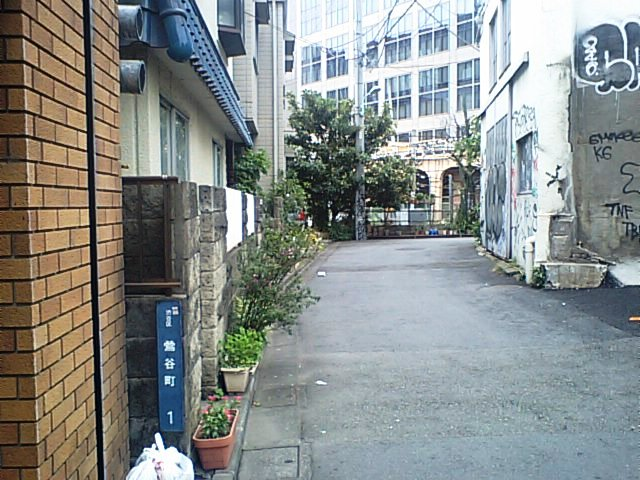
- Interactive map of Uguisudanichō
- Country: Japan
- Prefecture: Tokyo
- Special ward: Shibuya

Population (1 October 2020)
  - Total: 1,860
- Time zone: UTC+09:00
- ZIP code: 150-0032
- Telephone area code: 03

Uguisudanichō (鶯谷町) is a district of Shibuya, Tokyo, Japan.

As of October 2020, the population of this district is 1,860. The postal code for Uguisudanichō is 150–0032.

== Education ==
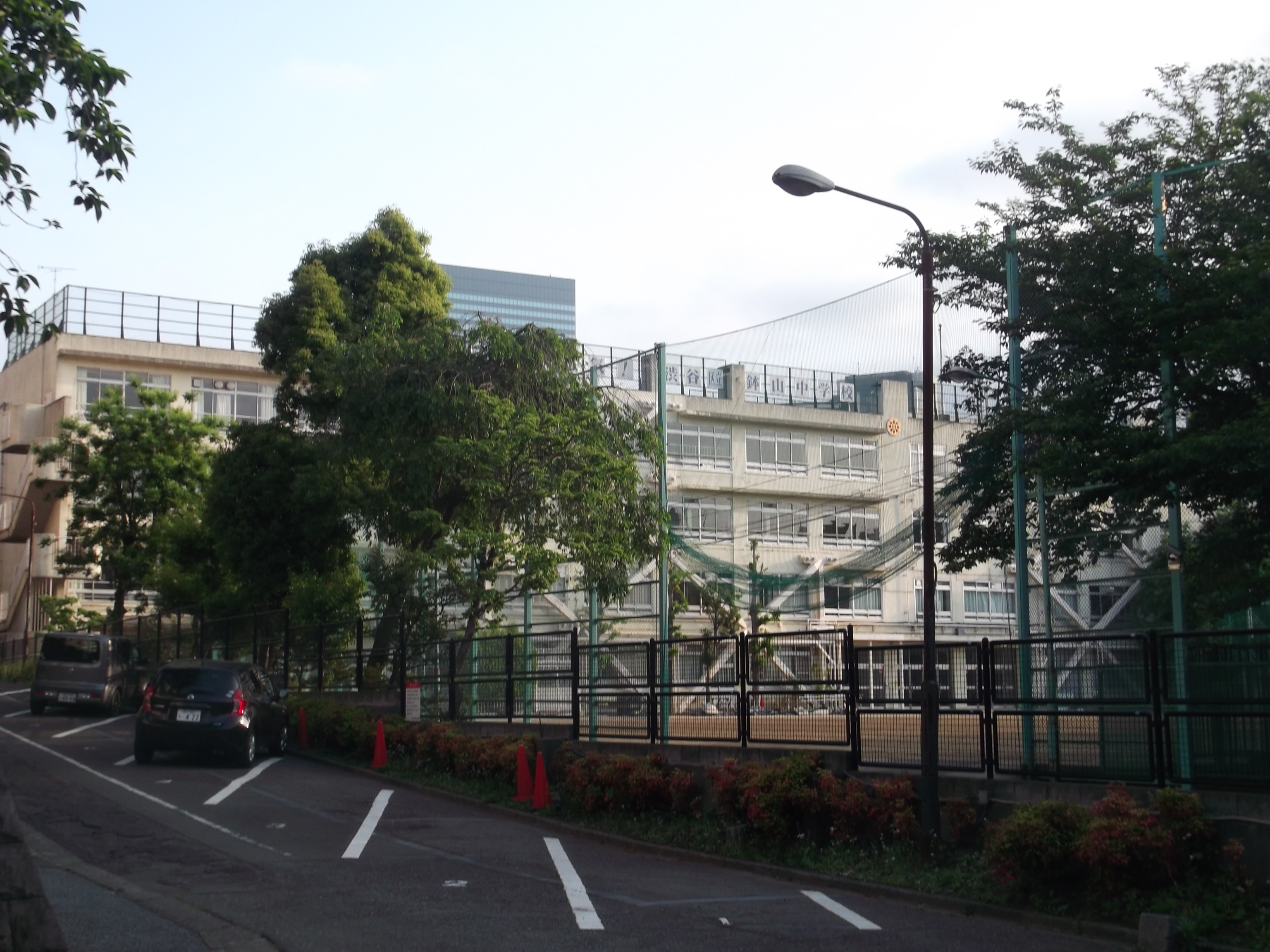
Hachiyama Junior High School (鉢山中学校)

Shibuya Board of Education operates public elementary and junior high schools. All of Uguisudanicho is zoned to Sarugaku Elementary School (猿楽小学校), and Hachiyama Junior High School (鉢山中学校).
