= Junior and Senior High School at Komaba, University of Tsukuba =

Coordinates: 35.655°N 139.681°E

- 筑波大学附属駒場中学校・高等学校
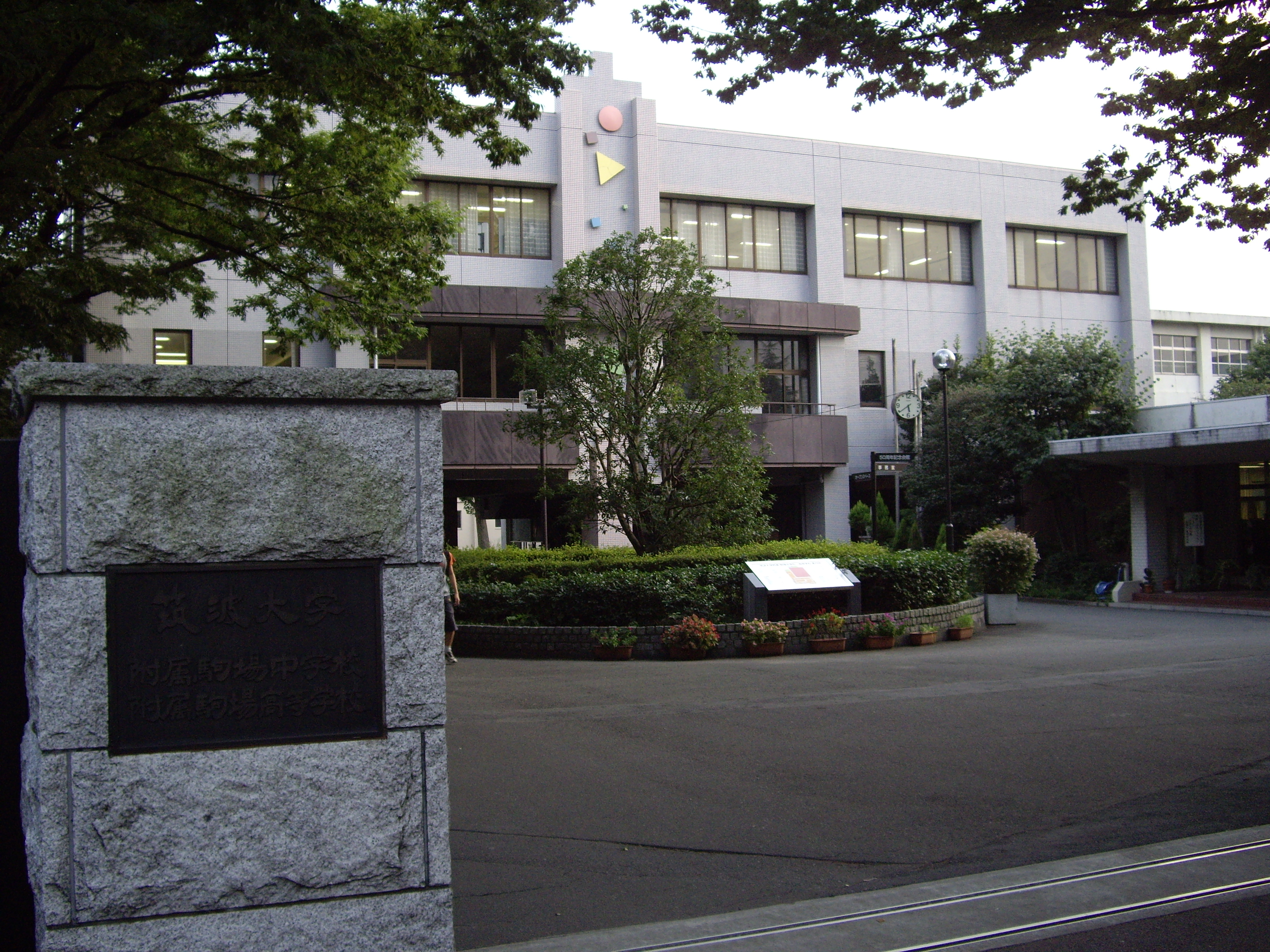

Information
- Funding type: National
- Motto: 自由・闊達の校風のもと、挑戦し、創造し、貢献する生き方をめざす (Aspire to a lifestyle based on endeavor, creation, and contribution under the tradition of liberalism and generosity)
- Established: 1947 (Junior High); 1950 (Senior High)
- Gender: Male
- Budget: JP¥50 million (c. 2005, excluding personnel expenses)
- Annual tuition: None (2024, Junior High); JP¥115,200 (2024, Senior High)
- Affiliation: University of Tsukuba
- Website: https://www.komaba-s.tsukuba.ac.jp/

Junior and Senior High School at Komaba, University of Tsukuba (筑波大学附属駒場中学校・高等学校) is a national boys' school located in Ikejiri, Setagaya, near Komaba. It is better known by the abbreviation Tsukukoma (筑駒). Tsukukoma is affiliated with the University of Tsukuba and offers a six-year secondary education program. Tsukukoma is the only national boys' school in Japan.

== Overview ==
In 1947, Tsukukoma was established as a new junior high school affiliated with the former Tokyo Agricultural School. It was later renamed Komaba Junior and Senior High School, affiliated with Tokyo University of Education in 1952, and then, in 1978, it came under the purview of the University of Tsukuba, which replaced Tokyo University of Education that year. Although it is an affiliated school of the University of Tsukuba, very few students choose to study at the university after graduation.

It is located on the site of the former Komaba Agricultural School and maintains a tradition of rice cultivation training in paddy fields, known at the school as 'Kellner Paddy'. In its vicinity there are Komaba Toho Junior and Senior High School, Tokyo Metropolitan Komaba High School, Komaba Gakuen High School, and Nihon University Komaba Junior and Senior High School.

The school is located on a hill approximately 700 meters south of the Komaba Campus, University of Tokyo, which mainly accommodates first and second-year undergraduates. Along with Nada High School, the school records the highest ratio of enrolling students into the University of Tokyo.

== Notable alumni ==
- Ryosei Akazawa
- Hiroki Azuma
- Arihiro Fukuda
- Shigeyuki Goto
- Masazumi Gotoda
- Yasuhiro Hanashi
- Kiichirō Hatoyama
- Hiroyuki Hosoda
- Togo Igawa
- Riichiro Inagaki
- Ken Ishii
- Takatoshi Ito
- Masaru Kaneko
- Akira Kasai
- Tomoaki Kato
- Akira Koike
- Fuhito Kojima
- Haruhiko Kuroda
- Shun'ichi Kuryu
- Satoshi Miyagi
- Shinichi Mochizuki
- Yasumasa Nagamine
- Eiichi Nakamura
- Hideki Noda
- Shigeru Omi
- Jiro Ono
- Ken Saitō
- Makoto Soejima
- Hayato Suzuki
- Kenji Tamura
- Kazuya Tatekabe
- Kazuo Ueda
- Masahiro Yamada
- Atsushi Yamaguchi
- Noriyuki Yamaguchi
- Inuhiko Yomota
- Yoshihide Yoshida
- Hiroshi Yoshikawa
