= Tomoaki =

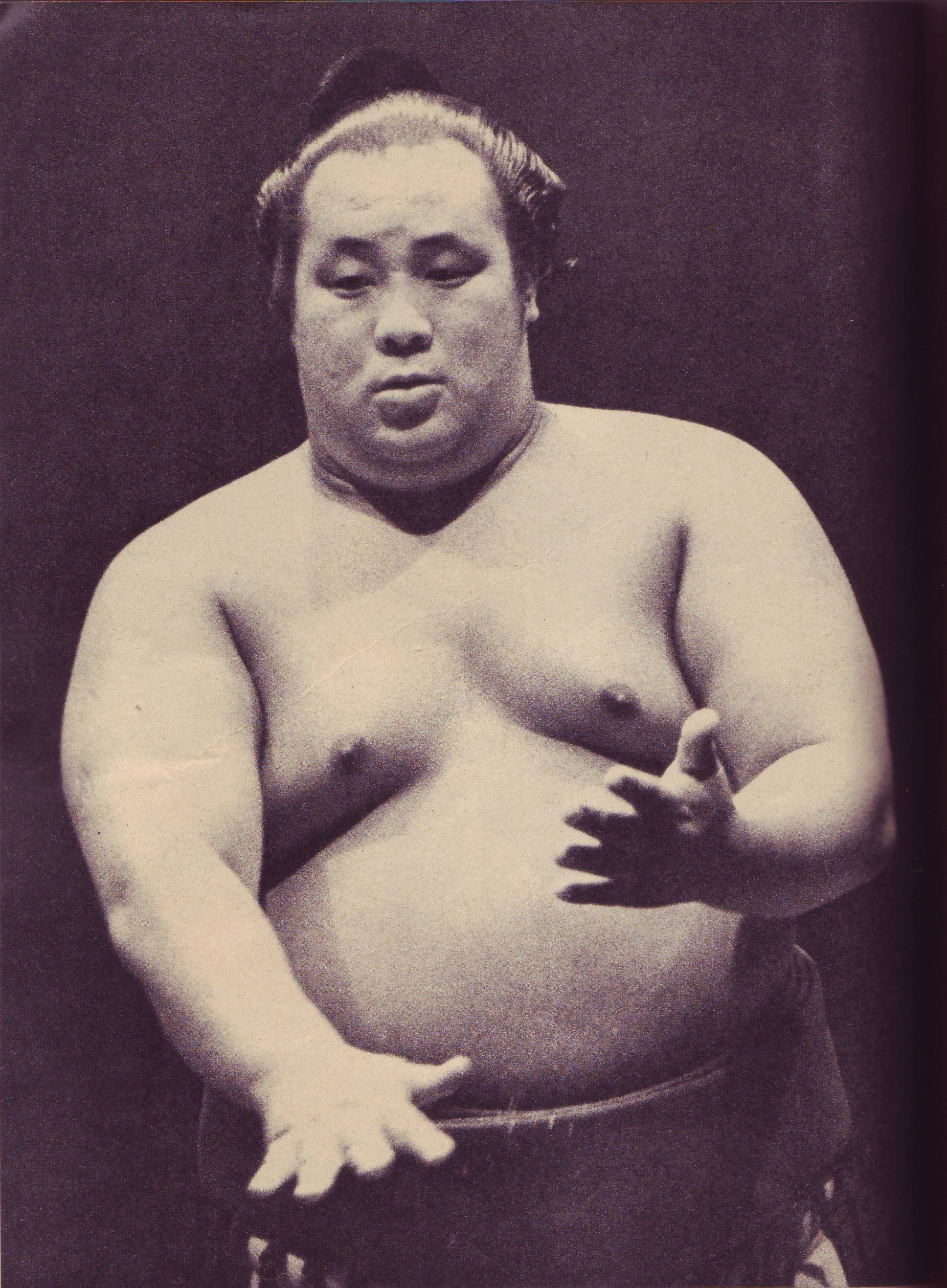
- Tomoaki Wakahaguro (1934–1969), Japanese sumo wrestler
- Pronunciation: tomoakʲi (IPA)
- Gender: Male

Origin
- Origin: Japanese
- Meaning: Different meanings depending on the kanji used

Tomoaki is a masculine Japanese given name.

== Written forms ==
Tomoaki can be written using many different combinations of kanji characters. Some examples:

- 知明, "know, bright"
- 知朗, "know, clear"
- 知晃, "know, clear"
- 知章, "know, chapter"
- 知旭, "know, rising sun"
- 知亮, "know, clear"
- 知彰, "know, clear"
- 知昭, "know, clear"
- 知秋, "know, autumn"
- 知晶, "know, sparkle"
- 智明, "intellect, bright"
- 智朗, "intellect, clear"
- 智晃, "intellect, clear"
- 智章, "intellect, chapter"
- 智旭, "intellect, rising sun"
- 智亮, "intellect, clear"
- 智彰, "intellect, clear"
- 智昭, "intellect, clear"
- 智秋, "intellect, autumn"
- 智晶, "intellect, sparkle"
- 友明, "friend, bright"
- 友朗, "friend, clear"
- 友晃, "friend, clear"
- 友章, "friend, chapter"
- 友旭, "friend, rising sun"
- 友彰, "friend, clear"
- 友昭, "friend, clear"
- 共明, "together, bright"
- 共晃, "together, clear"
- 朋明, "companion, bright"
- 朋章, "companion, chapter"
- 朝明, "morning/dynasty, bright"
- 朝晃, "morning/dynasty, clear"
- 朝章, "morning/dynasty, chapter
- 朝昭, "morning/dynasty, clear"

The name can also be written in hiragana ともあき or katakana トモアキ.

== Notable people with the name ==
- Tomoaki Egawa (江川 智晃; born 1986), Japanese baseball player
- Tomoaki Hamatsu (浜津 智明; born 1975), Japanese comedian and media personality
- Tomoaki Honma (本間 朋晃; born 1976), Japanese professional wrestler
- Tomoaki Ishizuka (石塚 智昭; born 1965), Japanese guitarist
- Tomoaki Kanemoto (金本 知憲; born 1968), Japanese baseball player
- Tomoaki Kato (加藤 友朗; born 1963), Japanese surgeon
- Tomoaki Komorida (小森田 友明; born 1981), Japanese footballer
- Tomoaki Koyama (小山 朋昭; born 1971), Japanese pair skater
- Tomoaki Kunichika (国近 友昭; born 1973), Japanese long-distance runner
- Tomoaki Kuno (久野 智昭; born 1973), Japanese footballer
- Tomoaki Maeno (前野 智昭; born 1982), Japanese voice actor
- Tomoaki Matsukawa (松川 友明; born 1973), Japanese footballer
- Tomoaki Makino (槙野 智章; born 1987), Japanese footballer
- Tomoaki Ōgami (大神 友明; born 1970), Japanese footballer
- Tomoaki Sano (佐野 友昭; born 1968), Japanese footballer
- Tomoaki Sato (baseball, born 1968) (佐藤 友昭), Japanese baseball player
- Tomoaki Satoh (baseball, born 1978) (佐藤 友亮), Japanese baseball player
- Tomoaki Seino (清野 智秋; born 1981), Japanese footballer
- Tomoaki Taniguchi (谷口 智昭; born 1982), Japanese rugby union player
- Tomoaki Wakahaguro (若羽黒 朋明; 1934–1969), real name Tomoaki Kusabuka (草深 朋明), Japanese sumo wrestler
