= Arihiro =

- Gender: Male
- Language: Japanese

Arihiro is an uncommon Japanese given name. It's also a surname.

== People ==
- Arihiro Hase (長谷 有洋; 1965–1996), Japanese voice actor
- Arihiro Fujimura (藤村 有弘; 1934–1982), Japanese actor and voice actor
- Arihiro Fukuda (福田 有広; 1963–2003), Japanese historian and professor
