= Historia Scientiarum =

- Discipline: History of science
- Language: English, French, German
- Edited by: Takehiko Hashimoto

Publication details
- Former name(s): Japanese Studies in the History of Science
- History: 1962-present
- Publisher: History of Science Society of Japan (Japan)
- Frequency: Triannually

Standard abbreviations
- ISO 4: Hist. Sci. (Tokyo)

Indexing
- ISSN: 0285-4821
- LCCN: 84640306
- OCLC no.: 613322722

Links
- Journal homepage; Online archive

Historia Scientiarum is a triannual peer-reviewed academic journal published by the History of Science Society of Japan. It was established in 1962 as Japanese Studies in the History of Science and obtained its current title in 1980. The editor-in-chief is Takehiko Hashimoto (University of Tokyo, Komaba Campus). Articles can be written in English, German, or French. The journal is abstracted and indexed in Scopus.
