= Komaba Park =

Park in Meguro, Tokyo, Japan

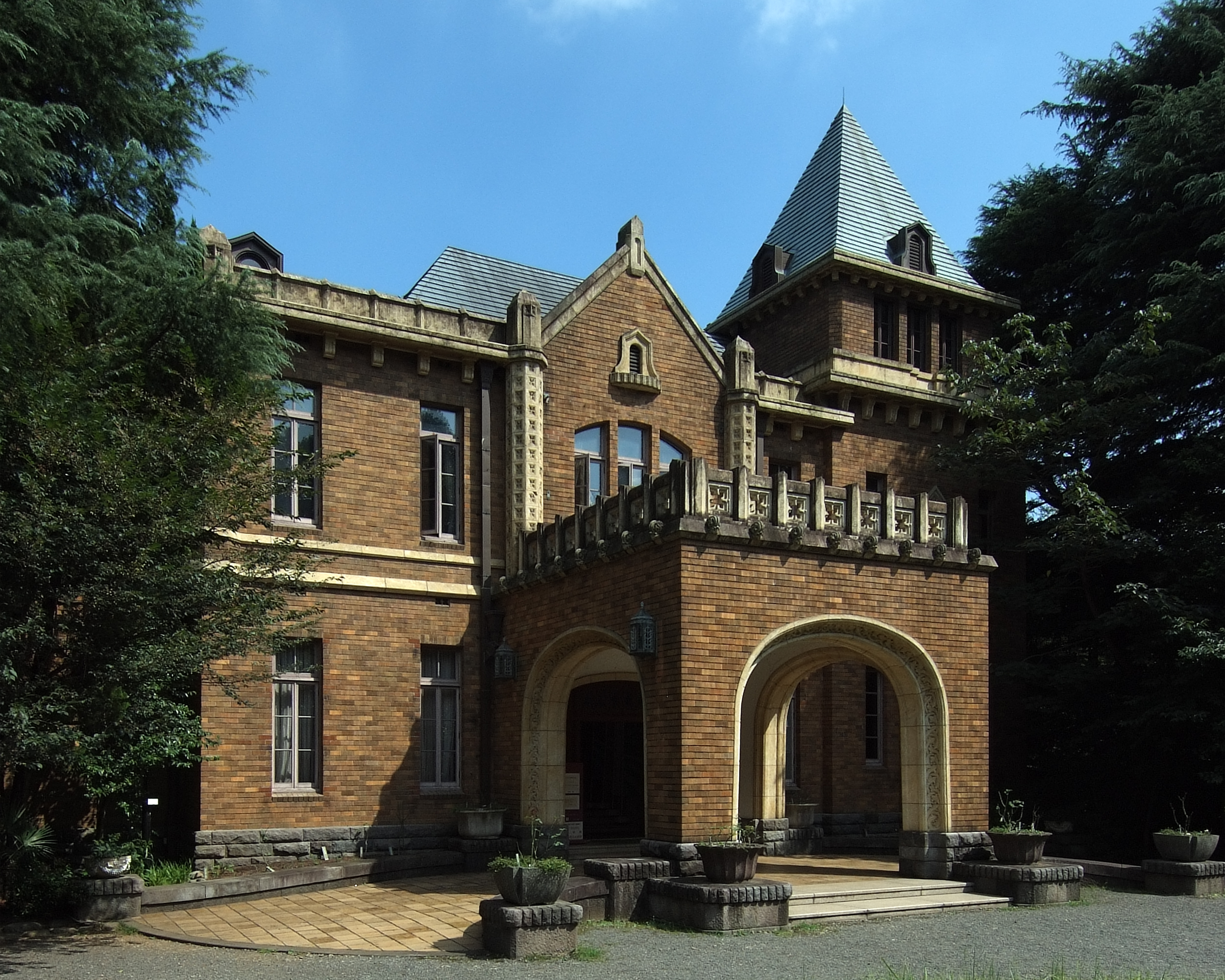
- Interactive map of Komaba Park
- Location: Meguro, Tokyo, Japan
- Coordinates: 35.3944°N 139.4048°E
- Area: 40,400 square metres (435,000 ft^{2})
- Created: 1975

Komaba Park (駒場公園, Komaba Kōen) is a park in Meguro, Tokyo, Japan located adjacent to the University of Tokyo, Komaba Campus.

== History ==
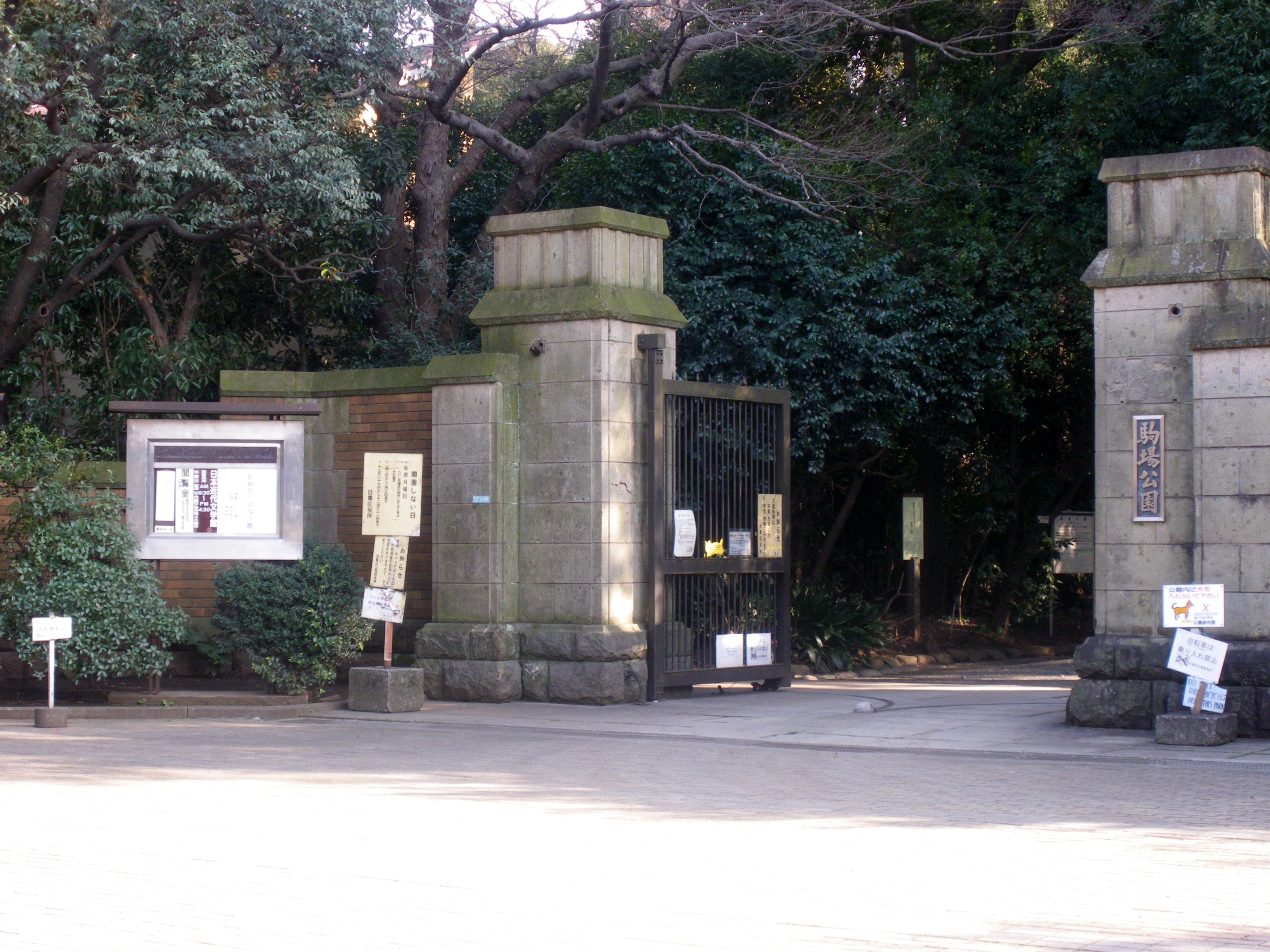
Komaba Park Entrance

The land was the site of the Komaba Agricultural College in the Meiji Era and then the location of the Tokyo Imperial University Faculty of Agriculture.

When the Tokyo Imperial University moved to its current location in Hongo, a land exchange was made with Maeda Family properties in Bunkyo, leading to the construction in 1929 of the landmark Tudor style residence for the 16th Marquis, Toshinari Maeda. Designed by architect Yasushi Tsukamoto, the western style residence was built of steel reinforced concrete to withstand earthquakes and served as the Marquis' family main residence.

A Japanese style garden annex was added in 1930 to provide accommodation and entertainment space for the many overseas visitors; the Marquis served from 26 July 1927 to 1 August 1930 as military attaché to Great Britain.

Requisitioned by SCAP from the end of the Second World War until 1957, the mansion served as the residence for General Ennis Whitehead, commander of the 5th Air Force, and later General Matthew Bunker Ridgway.

The grounds of the park also contain the Museum of Modern Japanese Literature.

== Gallery ==
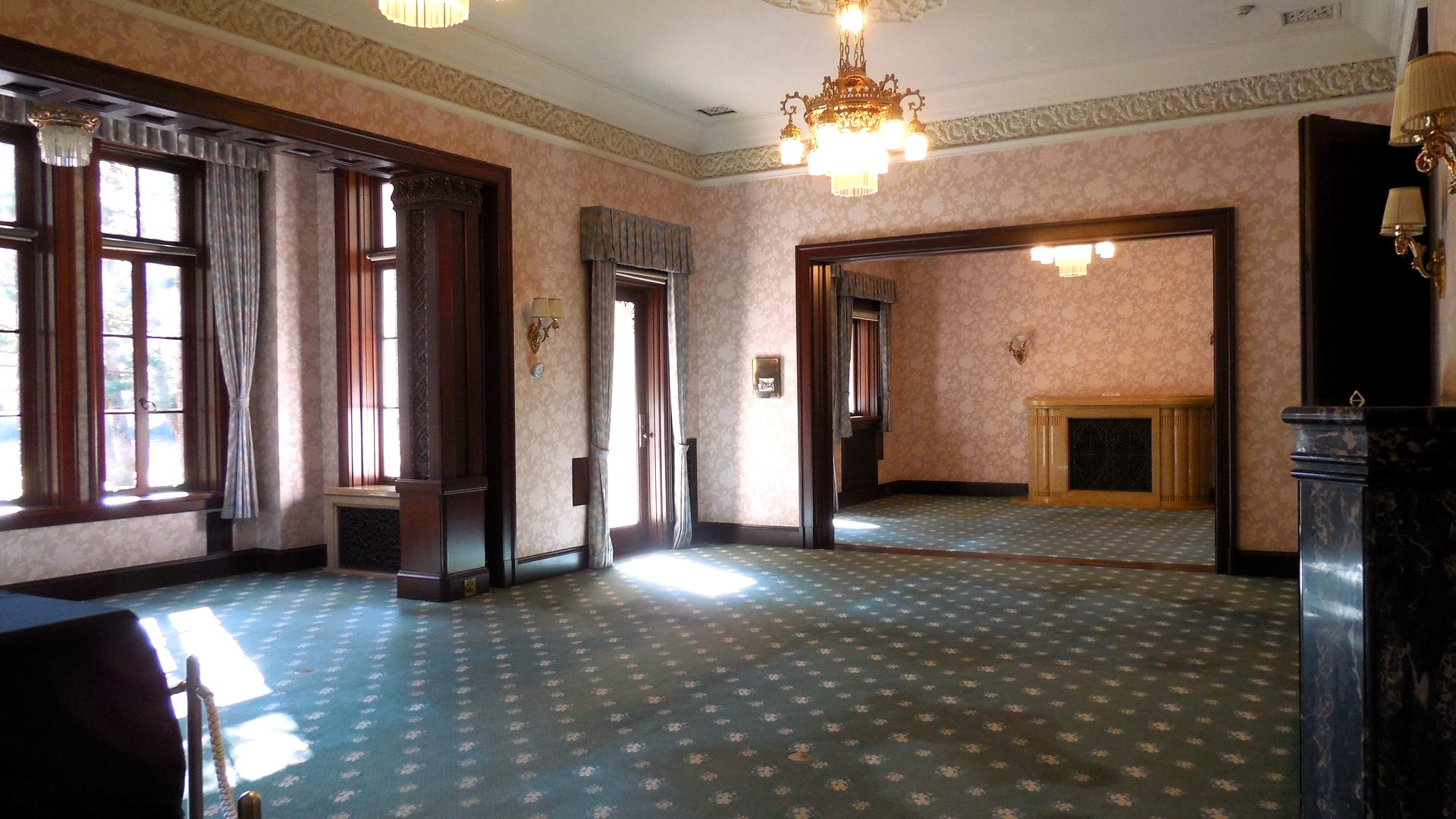
Maeda Family Residence, first floor large reception room.

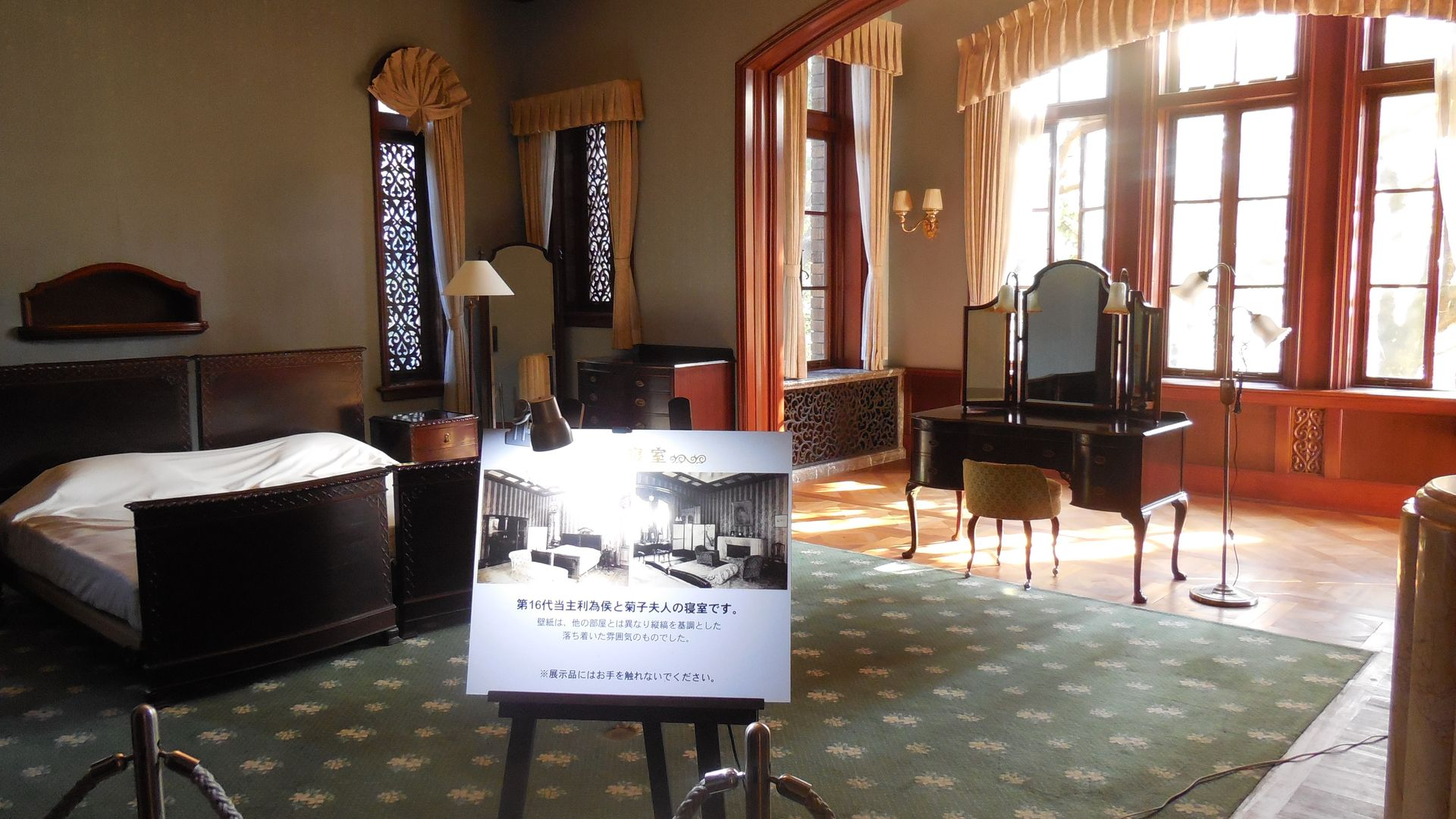
Maeda Family Residence, second floor master suite.

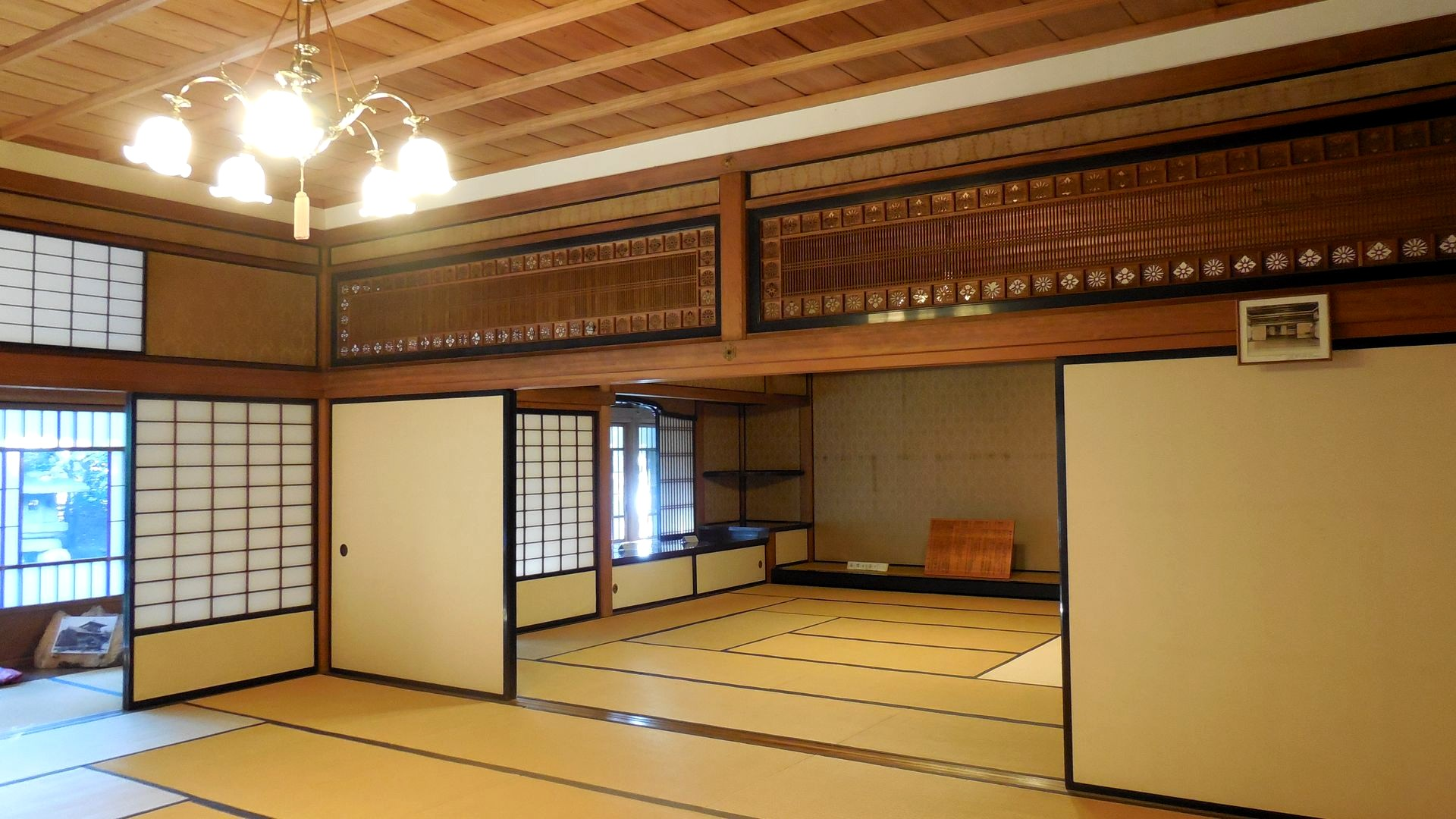
Japanese style garden annex, first floor guest room.

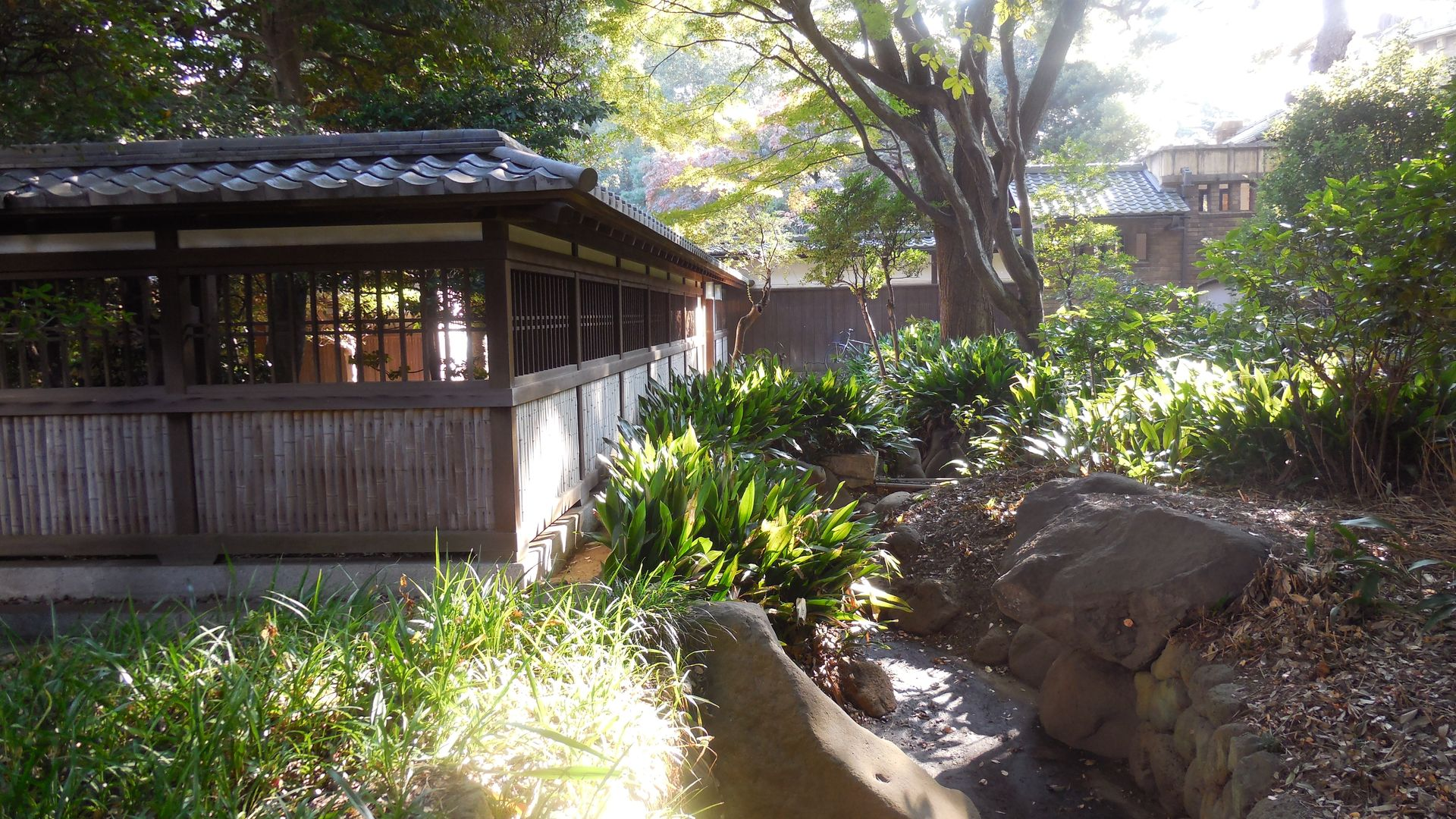
Japanese style garden annex, garden moat.

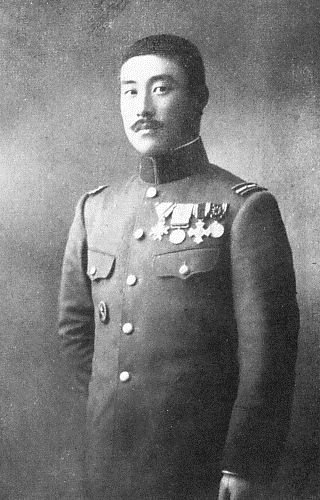
The 16th Marquis, Toshinari Maeda (1885-1942)
