= Komaba =

Neighborhood in Meguro, Tokyo, Japan

Coordinates: 35°39′31″N 139°41′4″E

Komaba 駒場
- Neighborhood in Meguro
- Interactive map of Komaba
- Country: Japan
- Prefecture: Tokyo
- Special ward: Meguro

Population (1 October 2020)
  - Total: 6,847
- Time zone: UTC+09:00
- ZIP code: 153-0041
- Telephone area code: 03

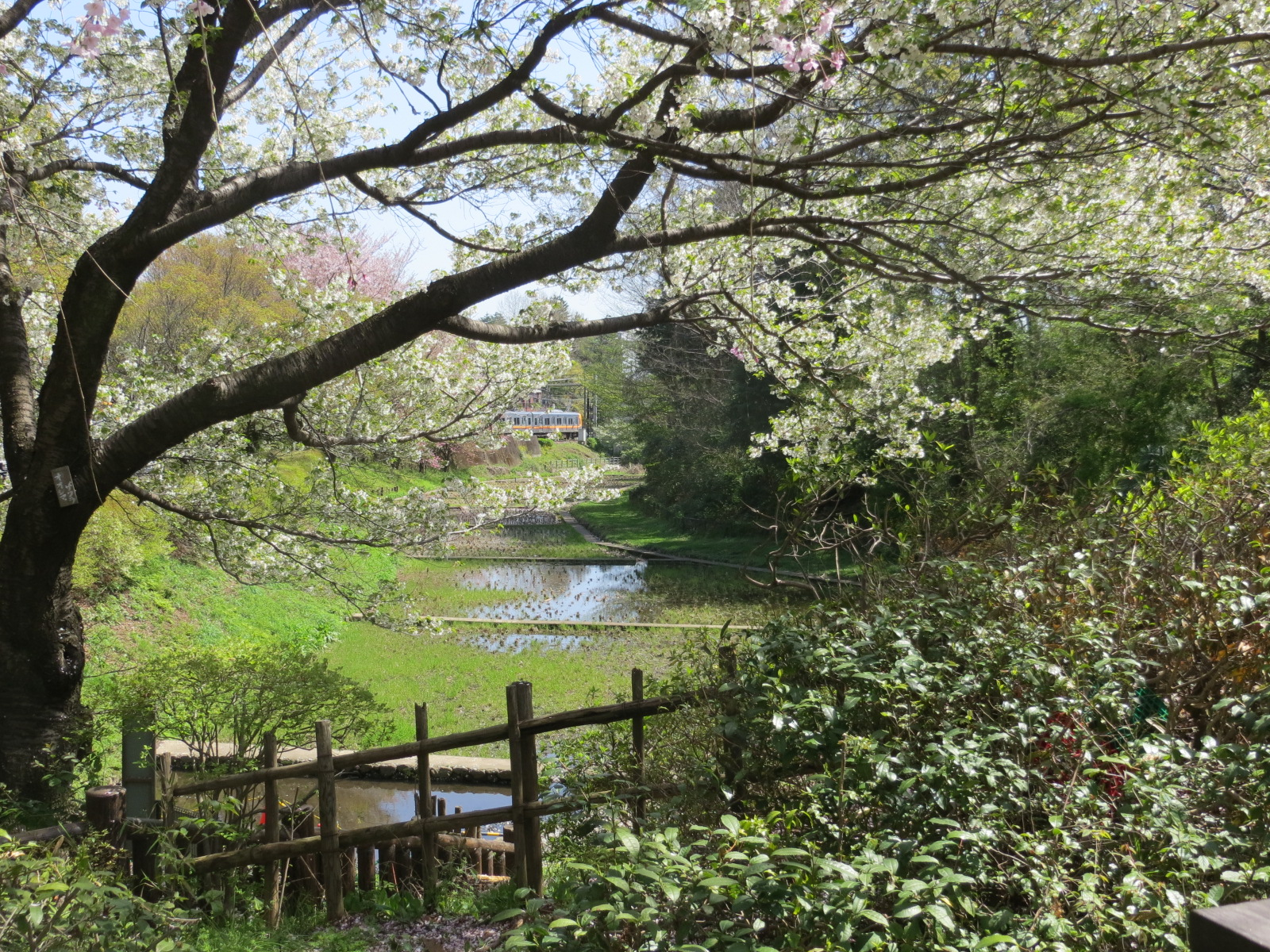
Komaba no Koen Kellner Rice Fields

Komaba (駒場) is a residential neighborhood in the northern area of Meguro, Tokyo, Japan. Consisting of four districts, the neighborhood has a population of 6,847.

The neighborhood is known as a center for education being the location of a number of selective entry high schools and the Komaba Campus of the University of Tokyo.

== Geography ==
Komaba borders Uehara and Tomigaya in the north, Shōtō, Shinsenchō and Aobadai to the east, Ohashi and Ikejiri to the south, and Daizawa and Kitazawa to the west.

== Landmarks ==
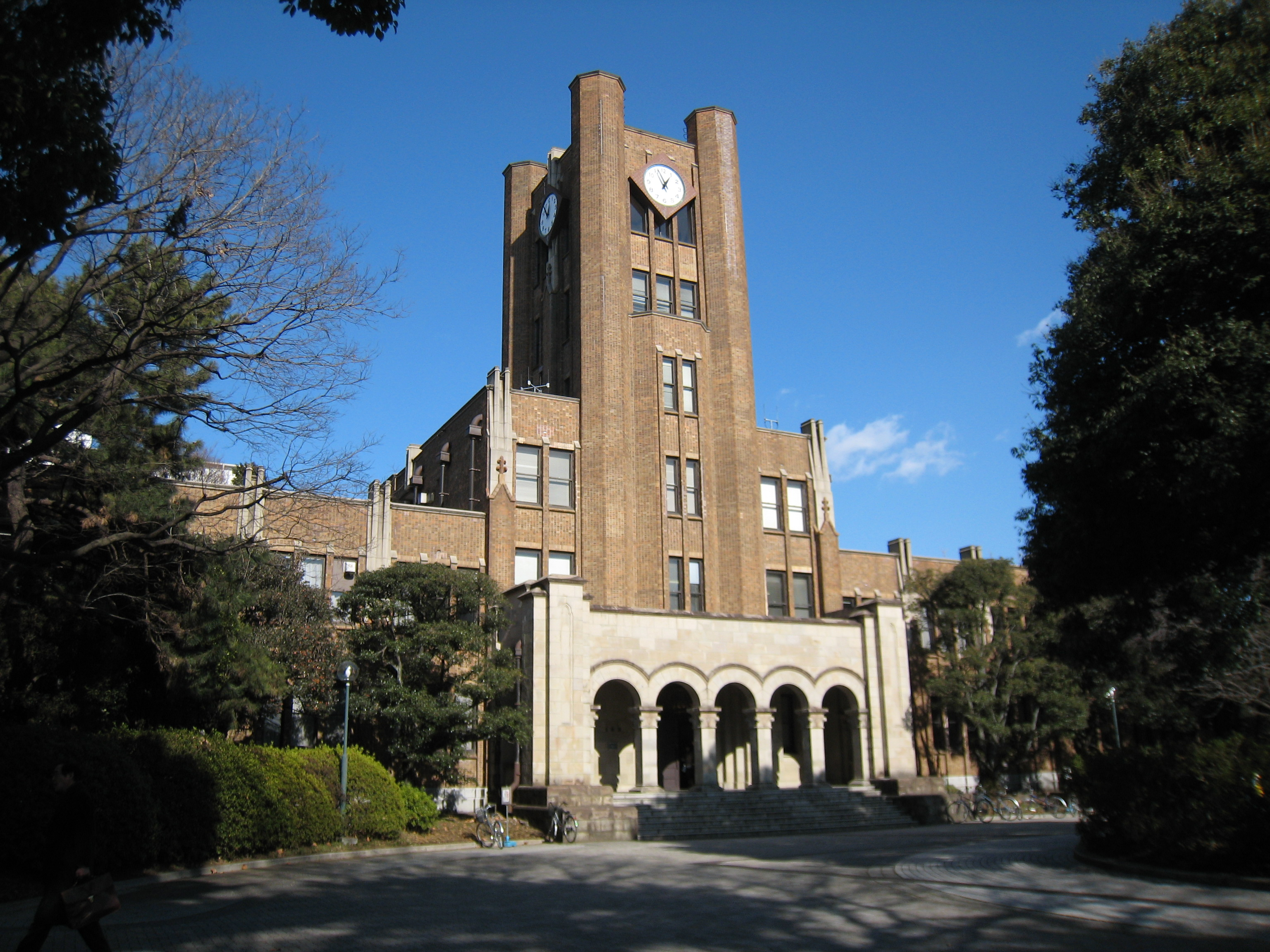
University of Tokyo, Komaba Campus

- University of Tokyo, Komaba Campus incorporating the Graduate School of Art and Science, the Graduate School of Mathematics, the Institute of Industrial Science Research, and the Research Center for Advanced Science and Technology
- Komaba Park, historic 1923 residence and garden estate of the Maeda family.
- Japan Museum of Modern Literature (on the grounds of Komaba Park)
- Komaba no Koen, featuring a municipal sports center and the Kellner Rice Fields
- Japan Folk Crafts Museum
- National Center for University Entrance Examinations

== Transportation ==
Komaba is served by Komaba-Todaimae Station on the Keio Inokashira Line.

== Education ==
- International High School
- Nippon Institute of Technology High School

Other close-by high schools that are named "Komaba", include:

- Komaba High School
- Komaba Gakuen High School
- Komaba Toho Junior & Senior High School
- Junior & Senior High School at Komaba, University of Tsukuba

Meguro City Board of Education operates public elementary and junior high schools.

All of Komaba (1-4 chōme) is zoned to Komaba Elementary School (駒場小学校) and No. 1 Junior High School (第一中学校).
