= Shigeru Omi =

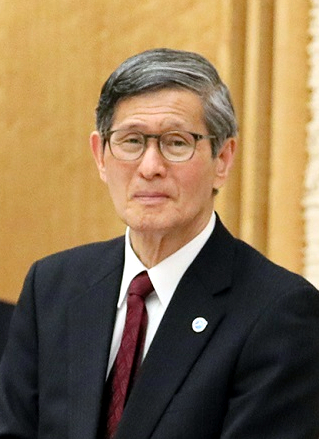
Shigeru Omi

Shigeru Omi (born June 11, 1949) is the President of the Japan Community Health Care Organization. He previously served as Regional Director of the Western Pacific Regional Office for the World Health Organization. He has been a member of the World Health Organization Executive Board since 2013.

== Early life ==
Omi was born in Tokyo on June 11, 1949. In 1967, while studying at the Junior and Senior High School at Komaba, University of Tsukuba, he was selected to take part in an American Field Service cultural exchange and studied at the high school in Potsdam, New York for one year. On returning to Japan in 1968, he found that due to nationwide student protests the entrance exams for Tokyo University had, as with other national universities, been cancelled by the government. Unable to apply there, he instead studied law at Keio University. At first he considered a career as a diplomat or in a trading company, but was deeply affected by reading the work of doctor and psychiatrist Yushi Uchimura. After dropping out of Keio University, he enrolled in a medicine degree at Jichi Medical University.

== Career ==
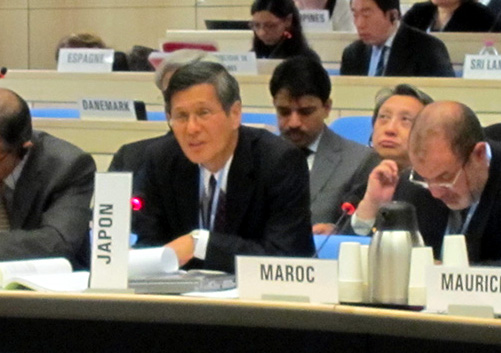
at the session of the Executive Board, World Health Organization (January, 2011)

During his tenure with the World Health Organization, he is credited with the eradication of polio in the 37 countries in the Western Pacific Region in 2000 as part of the Regional Polio Eradication Initiative. Also, he worked to fight both SARS and avian flu.

In 2006, Omi was a candidate for Director-General of the WHO but Margaret Chan was appointed instead. Between 2008 and 2009, he was part of a High-Level Taskforce on Innovative International Financing for Health Systems, which had been launched to help strengthen health systems in the 49 poorest countries in the world and was chaired by UK Prime Minister Gordon Brown and World Bank president Robert Zoellick.

From 2009 until 2012, Omi taught public health at Jichi Medical University in Japan. He was the President of the 66th World Health Assembly in 2013. In 2016, he was appointed by United Nations Secretary-General Ban Ki-moon to the Global Health Crises Task Force, jointly chaired by Jan Eliasson, Jim Yong Kim, Margaret Chan and Helen Clark.

=== Coronavirus pandemic ===
In February 2020, Omi was appointed vice chair of a government panel of experts on COVID-19 pandemic in Japan, and was a top advisor for the 2020 Summer Olympics organisation committee.

On 3 June, he stated that "it's not normal to host the games where there's a pandemic" ("パンデミックの所でやるのは普通ではない"). He also testified at a parliamentary committee that "if they were to be held during a pandemic, it is the organizers' responsibility to scale them down as much as possible and strengthen the management system", and on 19 June warned that due to a possible spike in infections in Tokyo, the games should be hosted without any kind of public.
