= Toshinari Maeda =

Japanese general

Marquess Maeda Toshinari
- 前田 利為
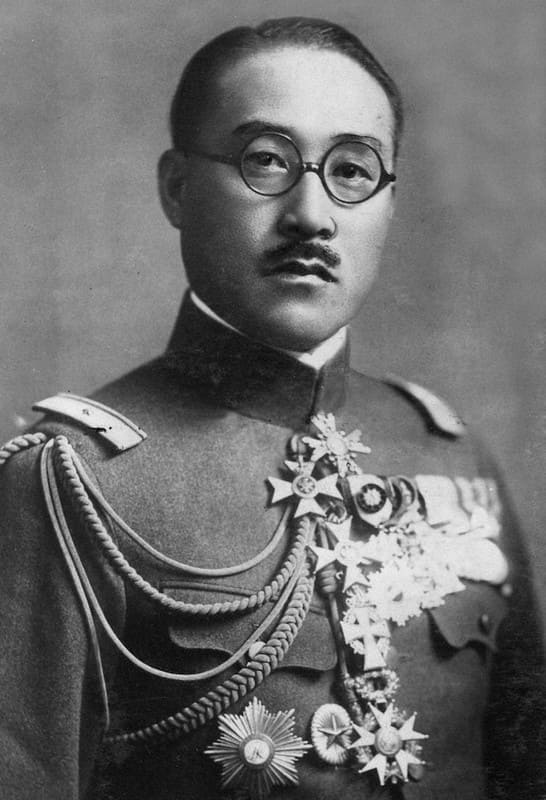
- Born: 5 June 1885; Tokyo, Japan
- Died: 5 September 1942 (aged 57) off Bintulu, Sarawak
- Alma mater: Army War College
- Military career
- Allegiance: Empire of Japan
- Branch: Imperial Japanese Army
- Service years: 1905–1942
- Rank: General (posthumous)
- Unit: Imperial Guard
- Commands: IJA 8th Division; Japanese 37th Army
- Conflicts: World War II; Pacific War; South West Pacific theatre †
- Awards: Order of the Rising Sun

Marquess Toshinari Maeda (前田利為侯爵, Maeda Toshinari Kōshaku; 5 June 1885 – 5 September 1942), was a Japanese nobleman who was the 16th head of the Maeda family. He was a general and the first commander of the Japanese forces in northern Borneo (Sarawak, Brunei, Labuan, and North Borneo) in World War II.

== Biography ==
Maeda Toshinari was born the fifth son of the former daimyō of Nanokaichi Domain in Kozuke province (modern Tomioka city, Gunma Prefecture), Maeda Toshiaki. He was adopted as heir to the main branch of the Maeda clan in 1900. He became marquis and the 16th head of the Maeda clan on 13 June 1900. His childhood name was Shigeru (茂).

As was common with sons of the kazoku aristocracy, he served for a session in the House of Peers in the Japanese Diet in 1910, while pursuing his military education. He graduated from the 23rd class of the Army War College in 1911. He was an outstanding student, and was awarded the Emperor's Sword on graduation. In 1913, he traveled to Germany for further studies, and from there went on to Great Britain.

On 7 August 1923, he became a battalion commander in the 4th Regiment of the Imperial Guard of Japan.

From 26 July 1927 to 1 August 1930 he served as military attaché to Great Britain. On his return in 1930, he was made regimental commander of the 2nd Regiment of the Imperial Guard. In 1935, he was made a member of the Imperial Japanese Army General Staff. From 1936-1937, he was superintendent of the Army War College, and on 2 August 1937, he was promoted to lieutenant general, commanding the IJA 8th Division. On 31 January 1939, he retired from active duty and was placed on the reserve list.

However, with the start of the Pacific War, Maeda was recalled to active service, and assigned command of the Borneo theatre of operations on 6 April 1942.

== Death ==
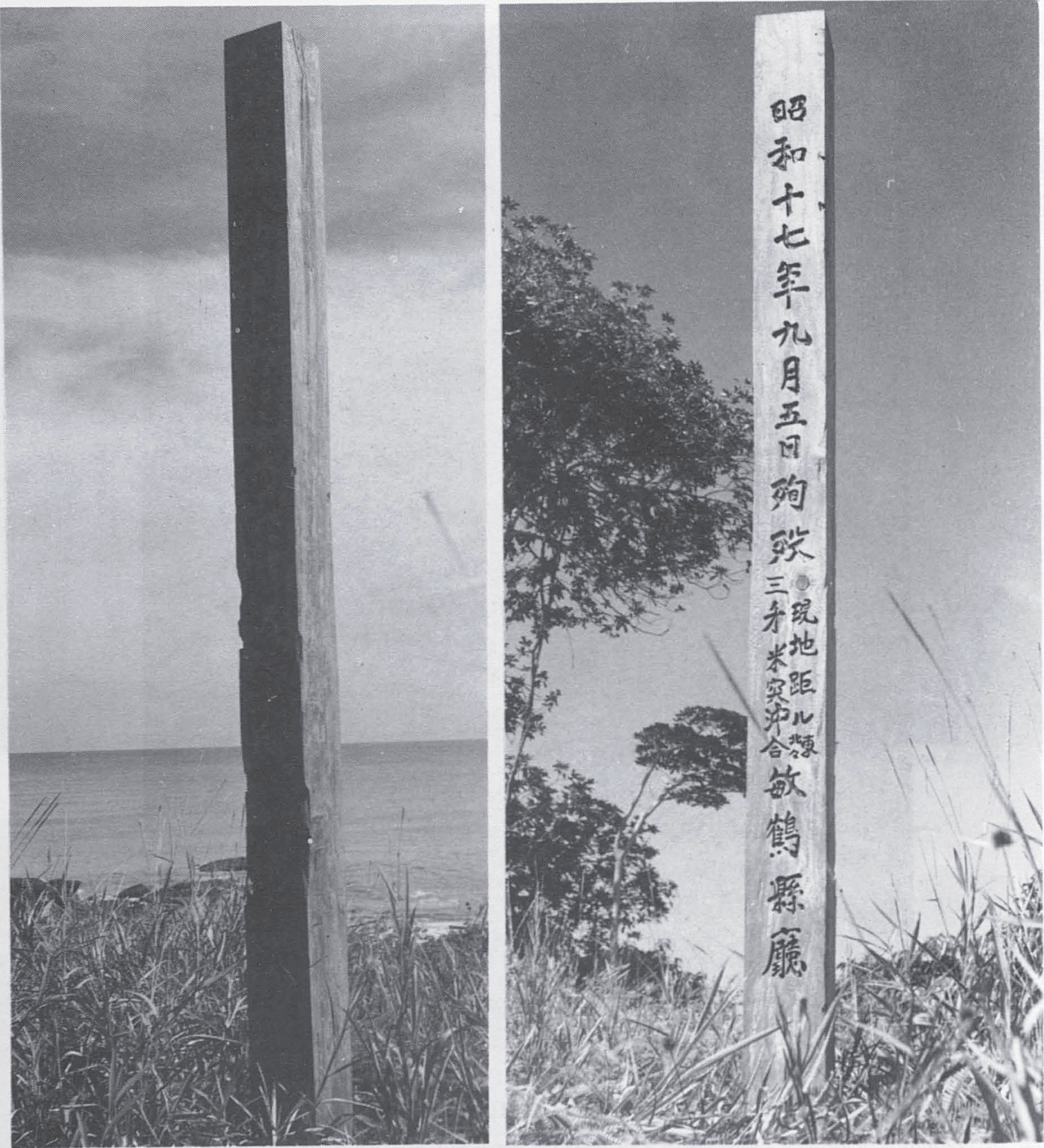
A wooden memorial pole was erected after Maeda's body was found near the Bintulu coast.

On 5 September 1942, there was an execution of five men at Padungan, Kuching who were caught for stealing petrol. The execution was witnessed by Maeda. Maeda later boarded a plane to Labuan that day to officiate an airport which bore his name. However, he never arrived. One month later, the plane was found to have crashed off the coast of Tanjung Batu, Bintulu. The cause of the plane crash was not known. The Japanese later set up a wooden pole memorial made up of Belian wood in Bintulu. The wooden pole was later taken back to Japan by the Maeda family. A memorial dedicated to the general is located in Labuan Museum's History Square.

== Family ==
- Father: Maeda Toshiaki (1850-1896)
- Foster Father: Maeda Toshitsugu (1858-1900)
- Wives:
  - Maeda Namiko, Maeda Toshitsugu‘s daughter
  - Maeda Kikuko (1903-1986)
- Children:
  - Toshitatsu Maeda (1908-1989) by Namiko
  - Sakai Miiko (1926–1999) married Sakai Tadamoto by Kikuko
  - Maeda Toshihiro (b.1929) by Kikuko
  - Yoko by Kikuko

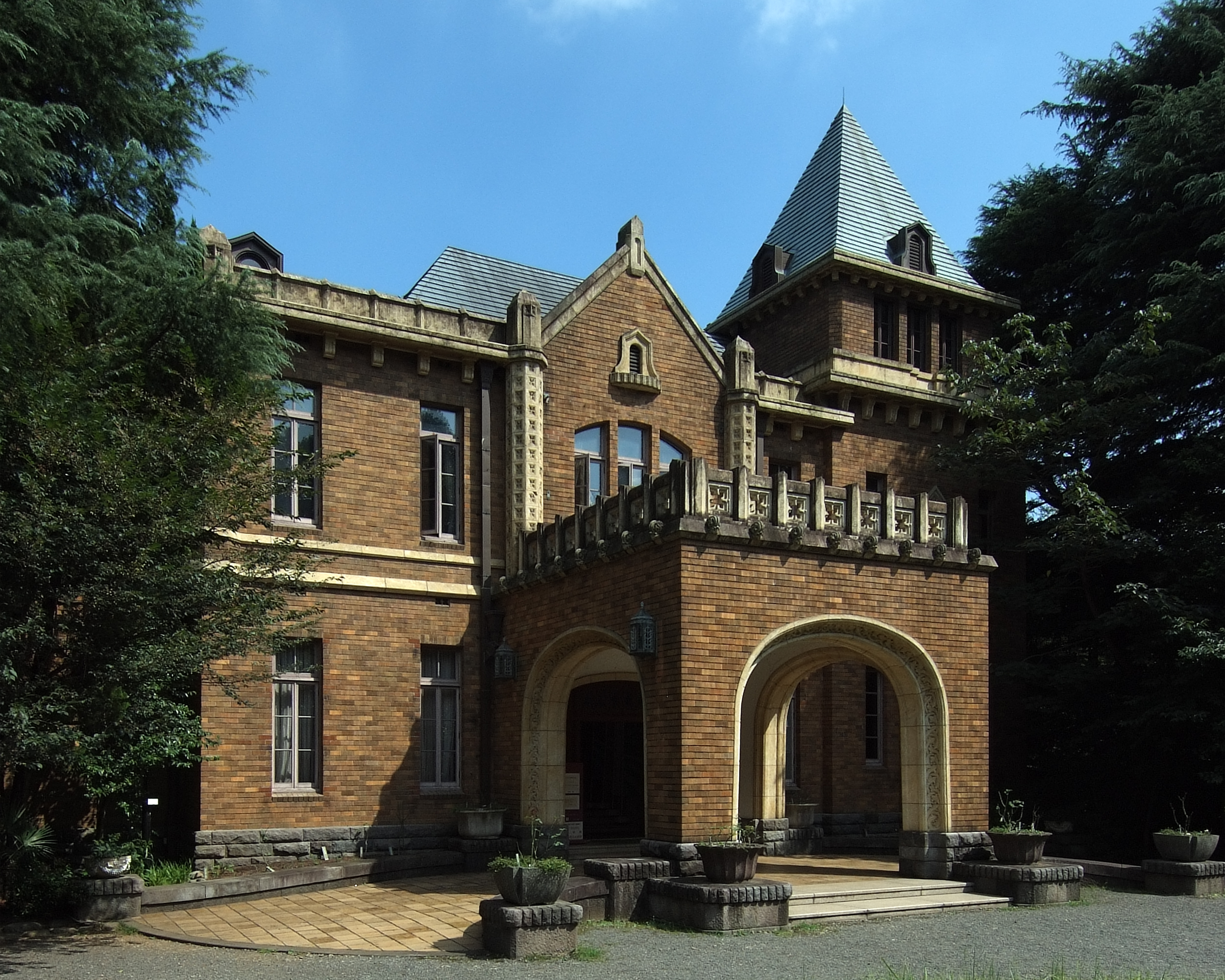
Former residence of Marquess Maeda in Komaba

Maeda's former home built in 1929 in Komaba, Meguro, Tokyo, survives today as the historic centerpiece of Komaba Park. It was requisitioned by SCAP after the end of World War II for use as a residence by General Ennis Whitehead, commander of the 5th Air Force, and later by General Matthew Bunker Ridgway. In 1957, ownership was then transferred to Meguro Ward. Part of the grounds of the estate now host the Japan Museum of Modern Literature. Likewise, his former summer mansion in Kamakura (built in 1936) was used as a summer residence by Japanese Prime Minister Eisaku Satō, and later donated to the city of Kamakura for use as the Kamakura Museum of Literature.

His daughter, Sakai Miiko (1926–1999), became a non-fiction author, writing several works on the kazoku and their tragic history in Shōwa period Japan.

== Notes ==
Preceded by Maeda Toshitsugu	16th Lord Maeda; 1900–1942	Succeeded by Maeda Toshitatsu
