= First Higher School =

Former boarding school in Tokyo

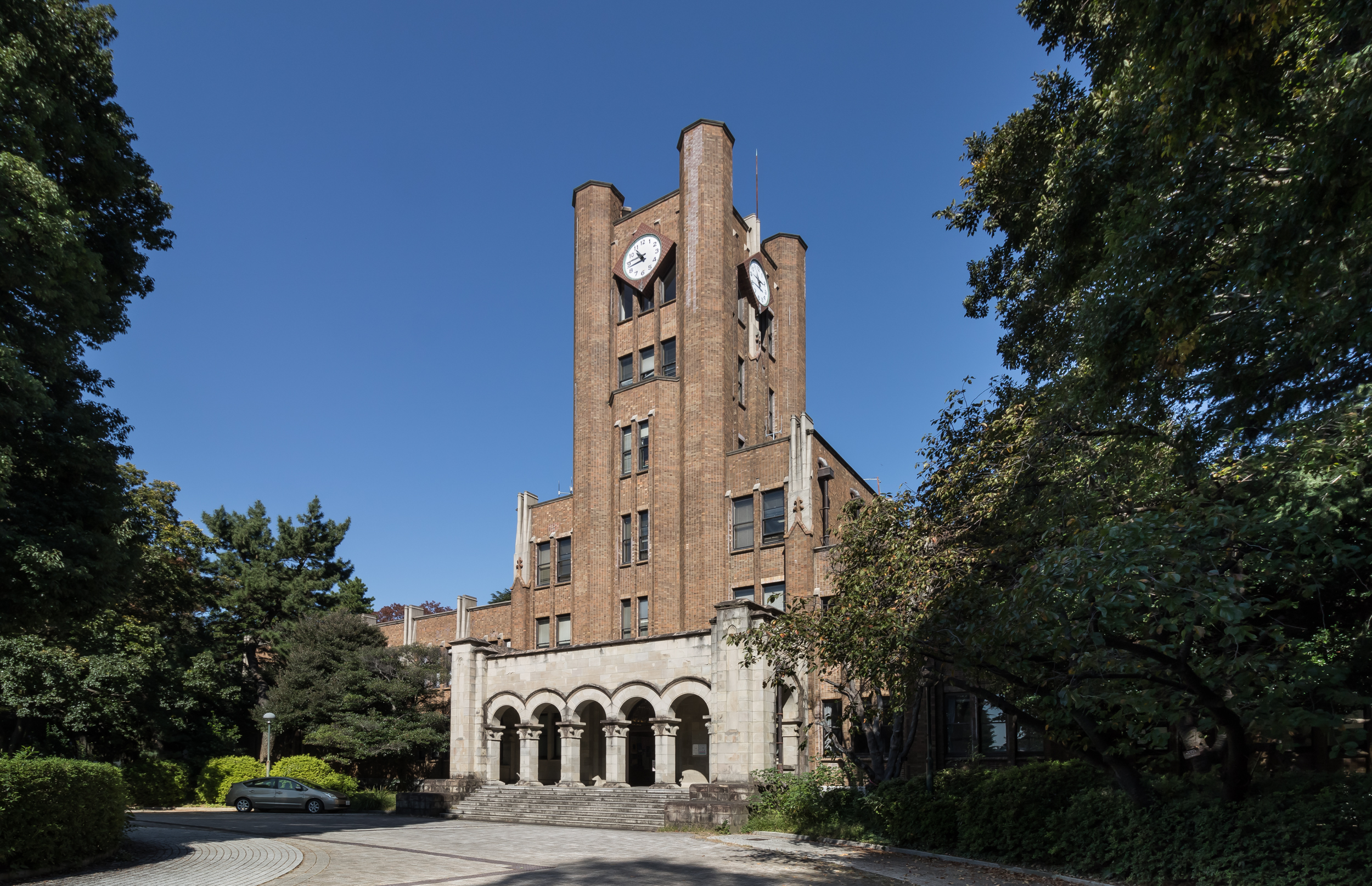
Building one, First Higher School (Now used by the College of Arts and Sciences, University of Tokyo)

The First Higher School (第一高等学校, Daiichi Kōtō Gakkō) was a university preparatory boy's boarding school in Tokyo, Japan. It is the direct predecessor of the College of Arts and Sciences of the University of Tokyo.

== Overview ==
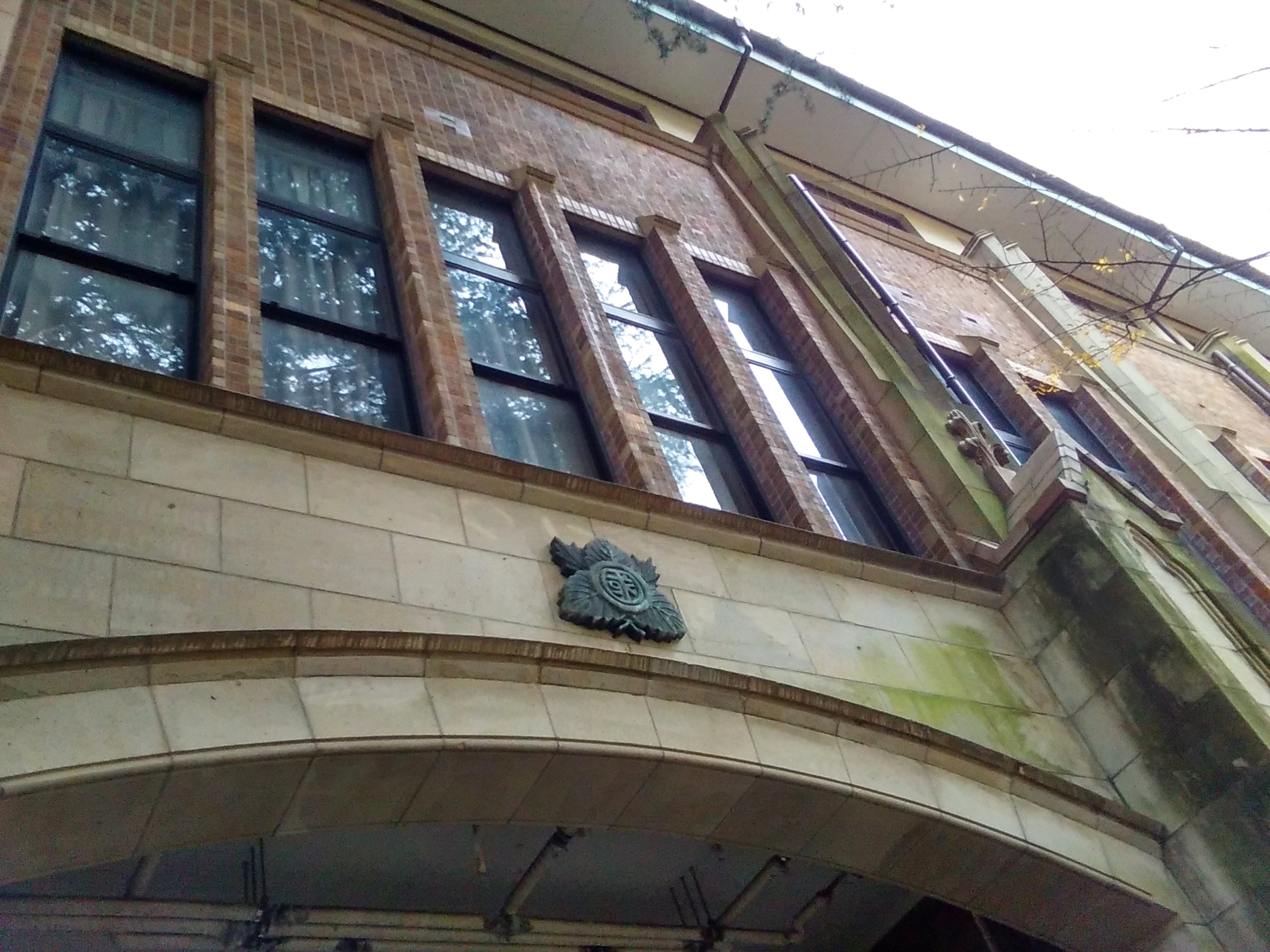
The school's emblem (Gokokuki)

The First Higher School was founded in 1886 as the nation's first higher school by separating the University of Tokyo's preparatory education division (東京大学予備門), focusing on European languages such as German, French, and English, as the only university in the country, the University of Tokyo, used these languages for teaching at that time.

Modelled after pre-university colleges in the United Kingdom and the United States, its role was to provide future university students with liberal arts education as opposed to specialised university education (教養主義, Kyōyōshugi).

In pre-war Japan, students from the upper class often followed a career path described as 'Icchu-Ikko-Teidai (一中一高帝大)', which stands for 'the first middle school (today's Hibiya High School), the First Higher School, then the University of Tokyo'. As symbolised by this phrase, the school was deemed as the most prestigious higher school in the country. Nine prime ministers of Japan were educated at the First Higher School (Kato, Wakatsuki, Hirota, Konoe, Hiranuma, Ashida, Hatoyama, Kishi and Fukuda).

After World War II, American-led educational reforms, targeting 'elitism', abolished higher schools, incorporating them into universities. The First Higher School was closed on 24 March 1950, and it became the College of Arts and Sciences of the University of Tokyo. Although for a shorter period of a year and a half compared to three years in the pre-war system, all undergraduates at the university are matriculated at this college and receive liberal arts education. The college still operates on the same campus as the higher school (Komaba Campus, University of Tokyo), and maintains the culture of the school up to today.
