= College of Arts and Sciences, University of Tokyo =

College within the University of Tokyo

College of Arts and Sciences Graduate School of Arts and Sciences
- 東京大学 教養学部・大学院総合文化研究科
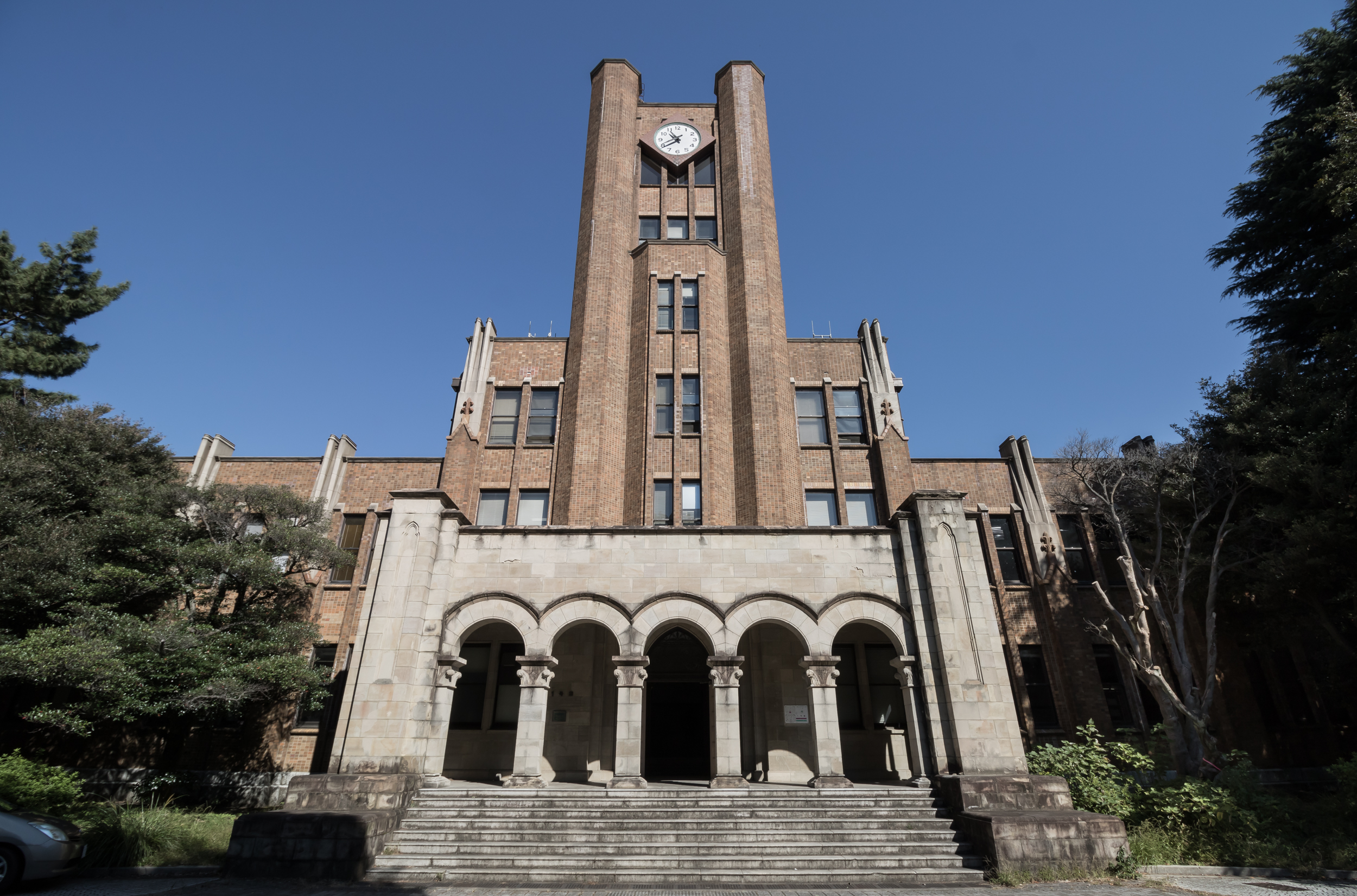
- Building One, Komaba I Campus
- Established: 1886 (as the First Higher School); May 31, 1949 (as the College of Arts and Sciences)
- Location: Meguro, Tokyo, Japan
- Campus: urban
- Website: https://www.c.u-tokyo.ac.jp/eng_site/

The College of Arts and Sciences (Note: Japanese: 東京大学教養学部, Hepburn: Tōkyō Daigaku Kyōyō Gakubu) is one of the ten undergraduate faculties of the University of Tokyo and the only one referred to as a college. The Graduate School of Arts and Sciences (Note: 東京大学大学院総合文化研究科, Tōkyō Daigaku Daigakuin Sōgō Bunka Kenkyū-ka) is the postgraduate and research school attached to it. Originally, the college was a university preparatory boarding school called the First Higher School until 1950, and it still operates on the Komaba Campus, which used to belong to the higher school and is separate from the rest of the university. Hence, the word Komaba (駒場) is synonymous with the College of Arts and Sciences within the university.

== Overview ==
Masato Hirai argues that the College's liberal arts education has been based on two different concepts: 'culture' as understood in Victorian England or 'bildung' in Germany, and the American concept of General Education. The former has traditionally been at the core of the education offered at the First Higher School, while the latter, which aims to equip students with the ability to see beyond their fields of specialisation, was introduced after the Second World War. This shift was prompted by the observation that the educated class in pre-war Japan tended to be myopic and focused too much on their allotted tasks.

=== Junior division ===
All first-year undergraduates are matriculated at the College of Arts and Sciences and spend two years as junior division students at the college. The liberal arts education they receive there lasts for the first year and a half, and from the second half of their second year, they receive specialised education from the senior division departments they are accepted into. Students are allowed to withdraw from the departments if they find they do not like it and can redo their second year and the specialisation-choosing process (the shingaku sentaku) the next year.

Apart from the compulsory modules, such as linear algebra, calculus, dynamics, electromagnetism, and basic biology for science students, and languages and academic writing for humanities students, students are required to take modules from various disciplines before they choose their specialisation for the shingaku sentaku. Although there are often requirements to complete compulsory modules for science students, humanities students are allowed to apply for science departments for the shingaku sentaku, and vice versa.

=== Senior division ===
Although most students opt to study at departments at Hongo for their specialised education, approximately 15% of them remain at Komaba for it. Komaba has small but well-funded research groups in both natural sciences and humanities. International relations, interdisciplinary social sciences, and cognitive science are among the most popular departments in the shingaku sentaku.

== Programmes ==
Below is a list of senior division programmes offered at Komaba. The graduate school is organised similarly.

- Department of Interdisciplinary Cultural Studies
  - Cultural Anthropology
  - Cultural Representation Studies
  - Comparative Literature and Culture
  - Contemporary Thought
  - Japan in East Asia Programme
    - part of the PEAK programme, primarily for international students and taught entirely in English
  - Interdisciplinary Language Sciences
  - Linguistic and Textual Culture Studies
- Department of Area Studies
  - British Studies
  - French Studies
  - German Studies
  - Russian and East European Studies
  - Italian and Mediterranean Studies
  - North American Studies
  - Latin American Studies
  - Asian and Japanese Studies
  - Korean and Korean Peninsula Studies
- Department of Integrated Social Sciences
  - Interdisciplinary Social Sciences
  - International Relations
- Department of Interdisciplinary Sciences
  - Science and Technology Studies Course
  - Geography and Spatial Studies Course
  - Integrated Information Studies Course
  - Wide-area System Studies Course
  - International Programme on Environmental Sciences (GPES)
    - part of the PEAK programme, primarily for international students and taught entirely in English
  - Evolutionary Studies Subcourse
- Department of Integrated Natural Sciences
  - Mathematical and Natural Sciences Course
  - Basic Physical Sciences Course
  - Integrated Life Sciences Course
  - Cognitive and Behavioural Sciences Course
  - Sports Science Course

== International education ==
Komaba is noted for its focus on international education. It offers all-English-taught international programmes in both natural sciences and humanities, called Programmes in English at Komaba (PEAK). A majority of classes for exchange students are also taught at Komaba, as they come from various specialisations and Komaba is a liberal-arts-focused college. As of May 2024, approximately 12% of the senior-division undergraduates (excluding exchange students) were foreign nationals, which was much higher than the figure for the entire undergraduate body of the university (3.4%). For the postgraduate courses, all courses accept international applications. Komaba's international student ratio was 27.8%.

== See also ==
- First Higher School
- Komaba Campus, University of Tokyo
