= Ikejiri =

Ikejiri (池尻) is a Japanese surname. Notable people with the surname include:

- Mayu Ikejiri (池尻 茉由, born 1996), Japanese footballer
- Shinichi Ikejiri (池尻 愼一, 1909–1945), Japanese physician and writer

== See also ==
- Ikejiri Station, a railway station in Kawasaki, Fukuoka Prefecture, Japan
