= Komaba Campus, University of Tokyo =

University campus located in Komaba, Tokyo

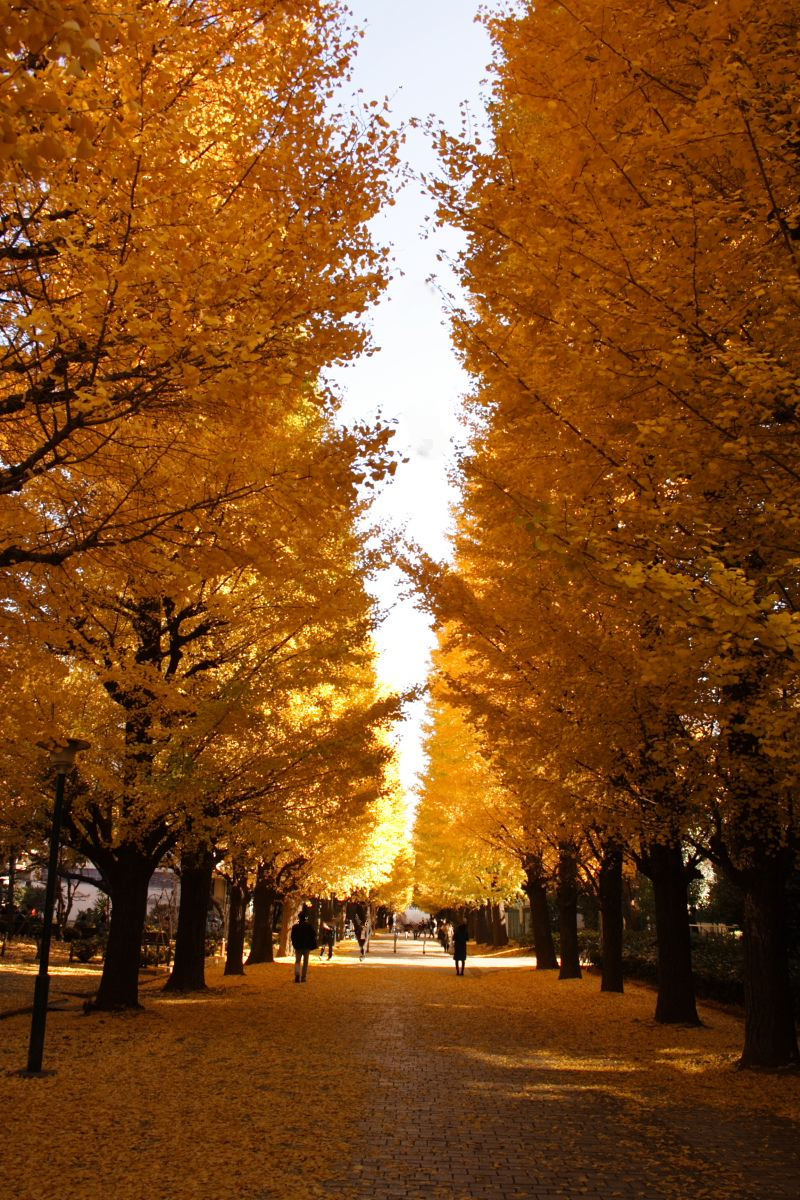
Komaba I campus in Autumn

The Komaba Campus, University of Tokyo (Japanese: 東京大学駒場地区キャンパス) is one of the three main Tokyo campuses of the University of Tokyo. It is divided into two sections; Komaba I and II. The former is home to the College of Arts and Sciences, the Department of Mathematics of the Faculty of Science, and their affiliated graduate school (the Graduate School of Arts and Sciences and the Graduate School of Mathematical Sciences respectively). The latter does not offer undergraduate programmes and is mainly used by the Research Centre for Advanced Science and Technology (RCAST) and the Institute of Industrial Science (IIS).

After matriculating at UTokyo, all undergraduates begin their academic journey at Komaba I, which encompasses the first one and a half years of their degrees.

Approximately 10 per cent of students opt to continue their education at Komaba beyond the junior division, matriculating at either the College of Arts and Sciences or the Department of Mathematics.

== History ==
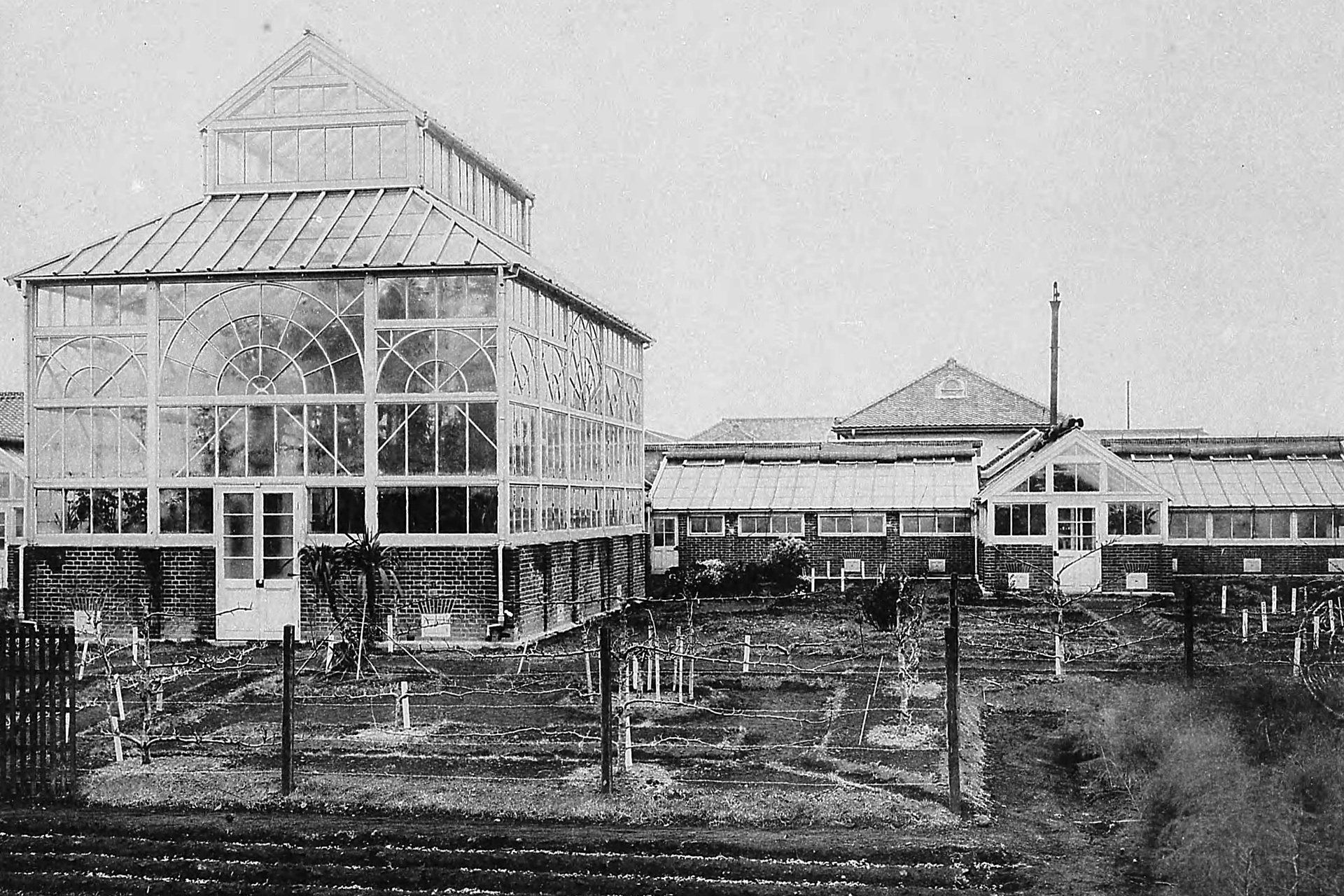
College of Agriculture of UTokyo at Komaba, c. 1904

The neighbourhood of Komaba was historically known as Komaba Meadows, a hunting ground for the Tokugawa family. In 1878, the Komaba School of Agriculture was established on this site. By 1919, it had evolved into the Faculty of Agriculture of UTokyo.

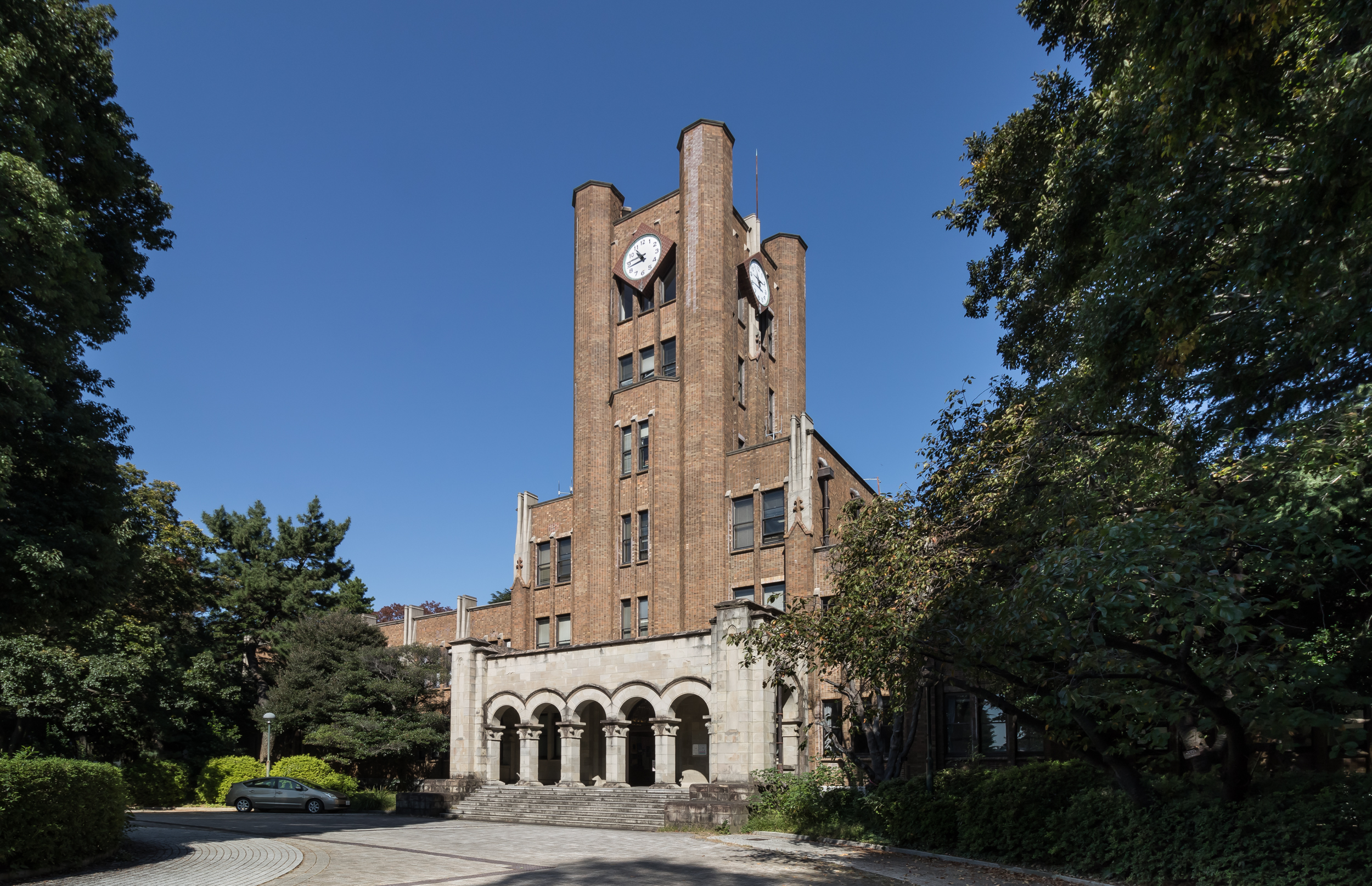
The clock tower of Komaba I, which was originally built as the main building of the First Higher School in 1935

In 1923, the Great Kanto Earthquake inflicted significant damage upon UTokyo and the First Higher School in Hongo. A subsequent agreement involved UTokyo, the First Higher School, and Marquess Toshinari Maeda, Lord of Kaga, who owned a substantial estate adjacent to UTokyo in Hongo. According to the terms, UTokyo relinquished all land held by its Faculty of Agriculture in Komaba, transferring it to the First Higher School and Marquess Maeda. In exchange, the First Higher School and Marquess Maeda vacated Hongo, allowing for the Faculty of Agriculture to relocate there and consolidate UTokyo's faculties in a single area.

Following Japan's defeat in 1945, the American occupation forces required Japan to reform its educational system to mirror the American structure. Consequently, the First Higher School, originally a university preparatory boarding school, was absorbed into UTokyo, and the Komaba Campus came under its ownership once more. It was renamed the College of Arts and Sciences and has preserved First Higher School's distinct culture to this day.

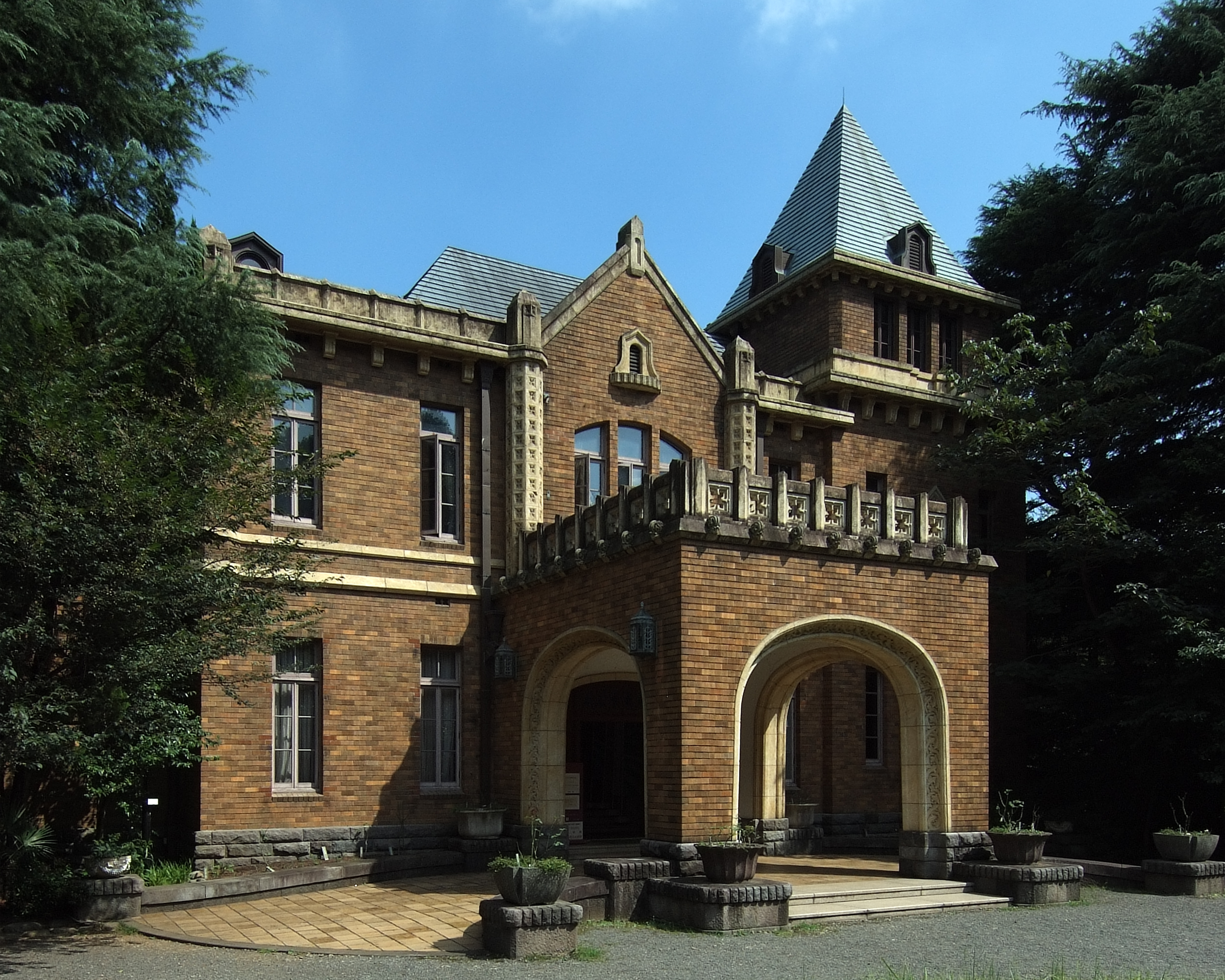
Former residence of Marquess Maeda in Komaba

Marquess Maeda was killed in action in Borneo during the war, and his former residence in Komaba has since been opened to the public.
