= Tomoaki Kato =

Tomoaki Kato (加藤 友朗, Katō Tomoaki) is a pioneer in multiple-organ transplantation, pediatric and adult liver transplantation. Kato is Surgical Director of Adult and Pediatric Liver and Intestinal Transplantation at NewYork-Presbyterian Hospital/Columbia University Medical Center and is a professor of surgery at Columbia University College of Physicians and Surgeons. Kato is also known for unique and innovative surgeries for adults and children, including a six-organ transplant; a procedure called APOLT (auxiliary partial orthotopic liver transplantation) that resuscitates a failing liver by attaching a partial donor liver, making immunosuppressant drugs unnecessary; and the first successful human partial bladder transplantation involving the transplant of two kidneys together with ureters connected to a patch of the donor bladder. In a highly publicized case, he led the first reported removal and re-implantation, or auto-transplantation, of six organs to excise a hard-to-reach abdominal tumor. Previously the director of pediatric liver and gastrointestinal transplant and professor of clinical surgery at the University of Miami School of Medicine, Kato received his medical degree from the Osaka University Medical School in Japan and received his residency training in surgery at Osaka University Hospital and Itami City Hospital in Hyogo, Japan. He completed a clinical fellowship in transplantation at the University of Miami/Jackson Memorial Hospital, in Miami, Florida, where he was subsequently appointed to the surgical faculty in 1997, and promoted to full professor in 2007. He served as a surgeon and senior leader of the liver and transplantation center at Miami's Jackson Memorial Hospital, beginning in 1997, and at University of Miami Hospital (previously Cedars Medical Center), beginning in 2004. Kato is a member of numerous professional and honorary organizations, and the author or co-author of more than 180 scientific papers in peer-reviewed journals.
