= Arihiro Fukuda =

Japanese historian

Arihiro FUKUDA
- Born: January 19, 1963; Japan
- Died: November 16, 2003 (aged 40)
- Other name: 福田 有広
- Education: University of Tokyo (B.A.); St Edmund Hall, Oxford (postgraduate)
- Occupation: historian

Arihiro Hoeber Fukuda (福田 有広, Fukuda Arihiro; January 19, 1963 – November 16, 2003) was a Japanese historian who was an associate professor at the University of Tokyo Faculty of Law and specialised in the history of Western political thought, particularly the republican ideas of James Harrington, Thomas Hobbes, David Hume, and Niccolò Machiavelli.

== Life and work ==
Fukuda received an M.Litt. degree in modern history from the University of Oxford in 1992, His master's thesis, "James Harrington and the idea of mixed government, 1642–1683", was selected for publication in the series Oxford Historical Monographs. It appeared in an expanded book form as Sovereignty and the Sword: Harrington, Hobbes, and Mixed Government in the English Civil Wars in 1997.

Following his return to Japan, Fukuda retained close ties to academia in the UK. His Oxford college, St Edmund Hall, extended him rights of the Senior Common Room, a privilege usually reserved for college fellows. He contributed a haiku to the 2001 anthology, Chatter of Choughs, which was devoted to the heraldic symbol of St Edmund Hall, the Cornish chough.

Fukuda died suddenly on 16 November 2003.

The 18th Comparative Law and Politics Symposium held at the University of Tokyo on 2004-09-29, entitled "Republicanism in Historical Contexts", was dedicated to the memory of Arihiro Fukuda.

== Contributions to scholarship ==
One of Fukuda's main contributions to the history of political thought is a critique of J.G.A. Pocock's understanding of republicanism. According to Eric M. Nelson, Fukuda has argued for seeing Renaissance republicanism as not only a political structure, but also as an ethical position.

In Sovereignty and the Sword, Fukuda is credited with offering a new interpretation of Harrington's ideas on republicanism, based on a "post-Pocockian analysis".

== Selected works ==
- Fukuda, Arihiro (1997). Sovereignty and the Sword: Harrington, Hobbes, and Mixed Government in the English Civil Wars. Oxford Historical Monographs. Oxford: Clarendon Press. ISBN 978-0-19-820683-5. OCLC 36207536.
- Fukuda, Arihiro (2002). Taniguchi, Masaki (ed.). Demokurashī no seijigaku = Politics and democracy (in Japanese). Tokyo: Tokyo Daigaku Shuppankai. ISBN 978-4-13-030126-8. OCLC 52580670.
- Fukuda, Arihiro (2005) [2001]. "Japanese Haiku". In Lucy Newlyn (ed.). Chatter of Choughs: An Anthology Celebrating the Return of Cornwall's Legendary Bird. illustrated by Lucy Wilkinson (2nd ed.). Penzance: The Hypatia Trust. p. 116. ISBN 1-872229-49-2. OCLC 64309779.
