= Yurigaoka Station =

Railway station in Kawasaki, Kanagawa Prefecture, Japan

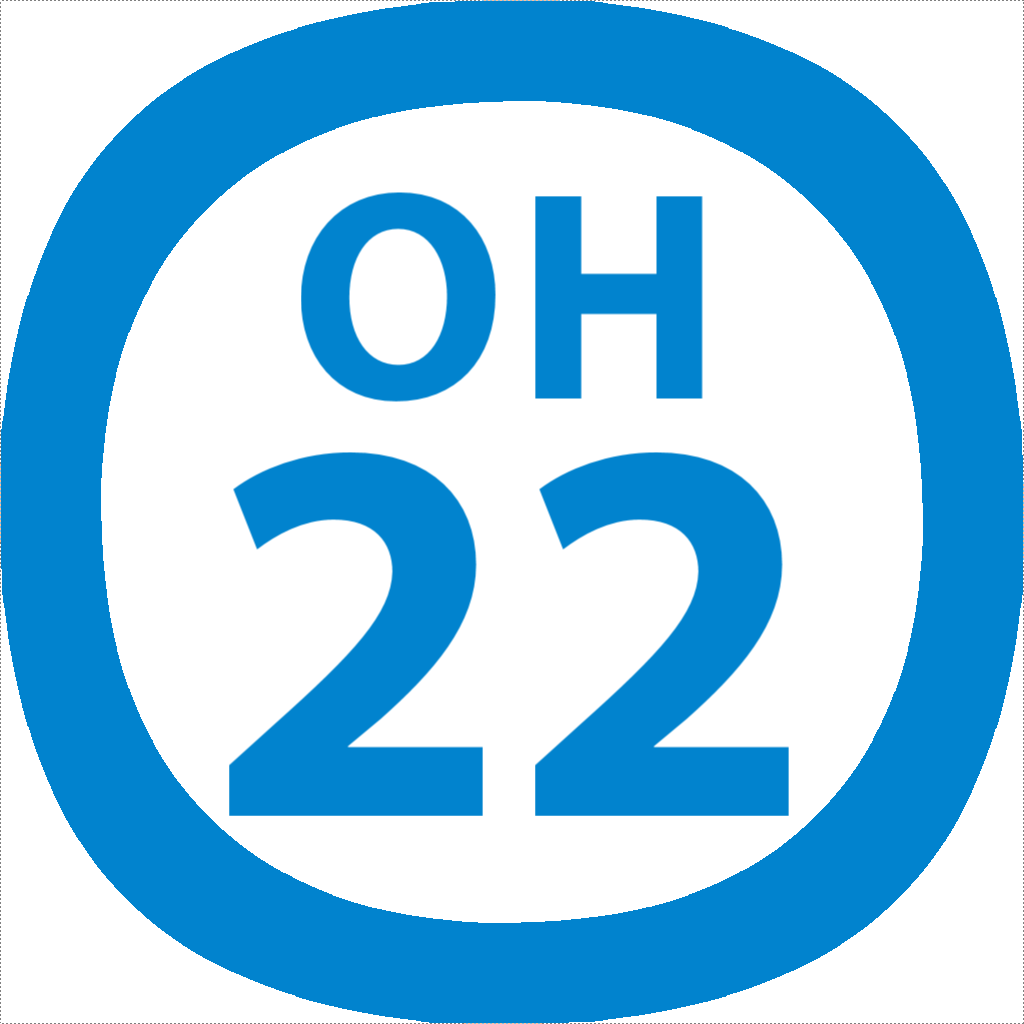
Yurigaoka Station 百合ヶ丘駅

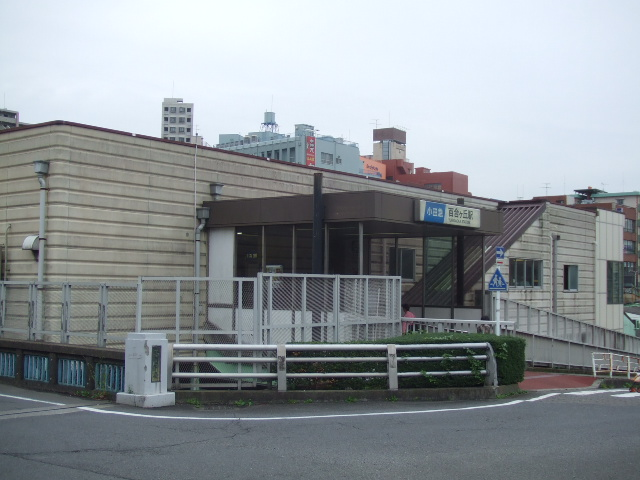
- North Exit of Yurigaoka Station

General information
- Location: Yurigaoka 1-chome, Asao-ku, Kawasaki-shi, Kanagawa-ken; Japan
- Coordinates: 35.6091°N 139.5162°E
- Operator: Odakyu Electric Railway
- Line: Odakyu Odawara Line
- Distance: 20.5 km from Shinjuku
- Platforms: 2 island platforms
- Connections: Bus stop

Other information
- Station code: OH22
- Website: Official website

History
- Opened: March 25, 1960; 66 years ago

Passengers
- FY2019: 21,681

Services
Preceding station	Odakyu	Following station
Shin-Yurigaoka One-way operation	Odawara Line Commuter Semi Express	Yomiuri-Land-mae towards Yoyogi-Uehara
Shin-Yurigaoka towards Hon-Atsugi	Odawara Line Semi Express	Yomiuri-Land-mae towards Yoyogi-Uehara
Shin-Yurigaoka towards Odawara	Odawara Line Local	Yomiuri-Land-mae towards Shinjuku or Yoyogi-Uehara
Location
- Location within Kanagawa Prefecture Location within Japan

Yurigaoka Station (百合ヶ丘駅, Yurigaoka-eki) is a passenger railway station located in the Yurigaoka neighborhood of Asao-ku, Kawasaki, Kanagawa, Japan and operated by the private railway operator Odakyu Electric Railway.

== Lines ==
Yurigaoka Station is served by the Odakyu Odawara Line, with some through services to and from Shinjuku in Tokyo. It lies 20.5 kilometers from the Shinjuku terminus.

== Station layout ==
The station consists of two island platforms serving two tracks.

=== Platforms ===
1	■ Odakyu Odawara Line	For Sagami-Ōno, Hon-Atsugi, and Odawara
2	■ Odakyu Odawara Line	For Kyōdō, Shimo-Kitazawa, Yoyogi-Uehara, Chiyoda line Ayase and Shinjuku

== History ==
Yurigaoka Station was opened on 25 March 1960. The station building was remodeled in 1981.

Station numbering was introduced in January 2014 with Yurigaoka being assigned station number OH22.

== Passenger statistics ==
The passenger figures for recent years are as shown below:

Fiscal year	daily average
2005	21,572
2010	21,177
2015	21,522
2019	21,681

== Surrounding area ==
- Yurigaoka Daiichi housing complex (currently Sanrafure Yurigaoka)
- Yurigaoka No. 2 housing complex (currently Yurigaoka Mizuki-gai)

== See also ==
- List of railway stations in Japan
