= Higashi-Kitazawa Station =

Railway station in Tokyo, Japan

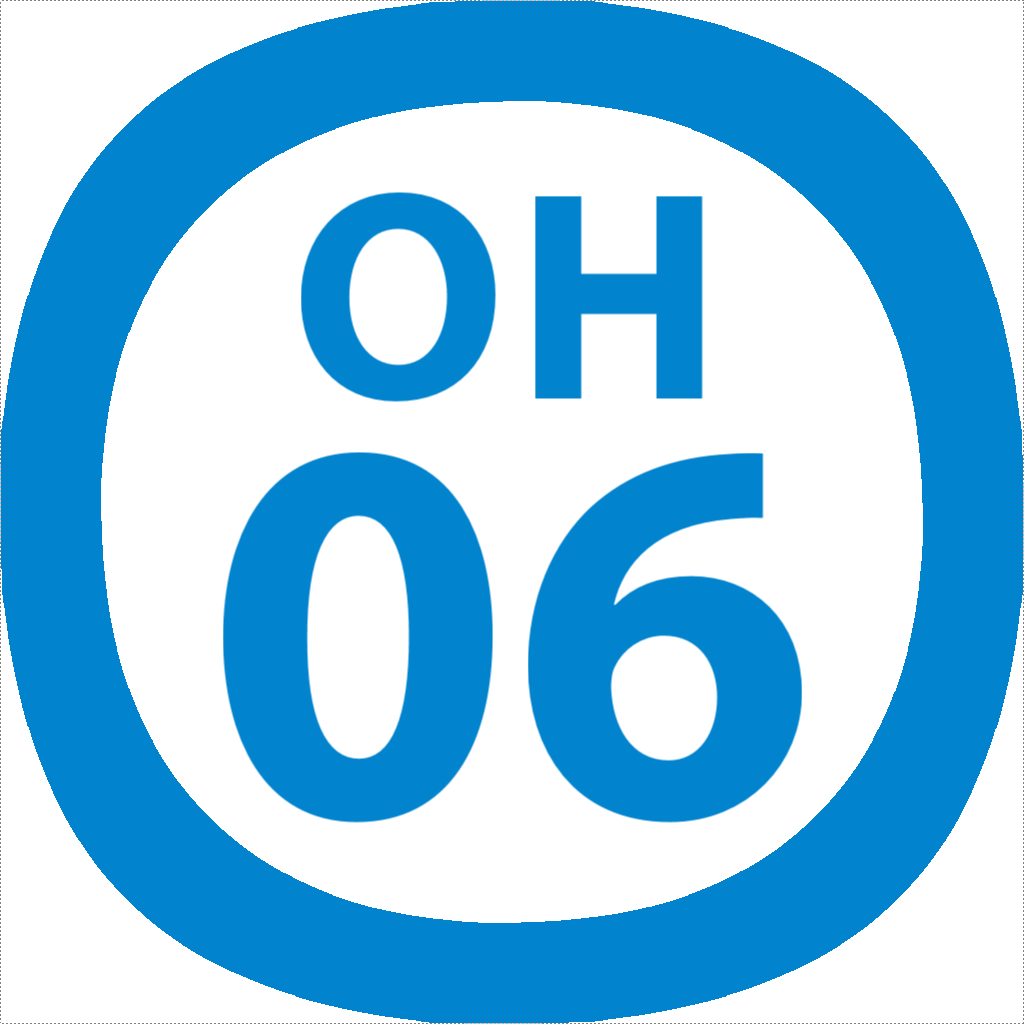
Higashi-Kitazawa Station 東北沢駅

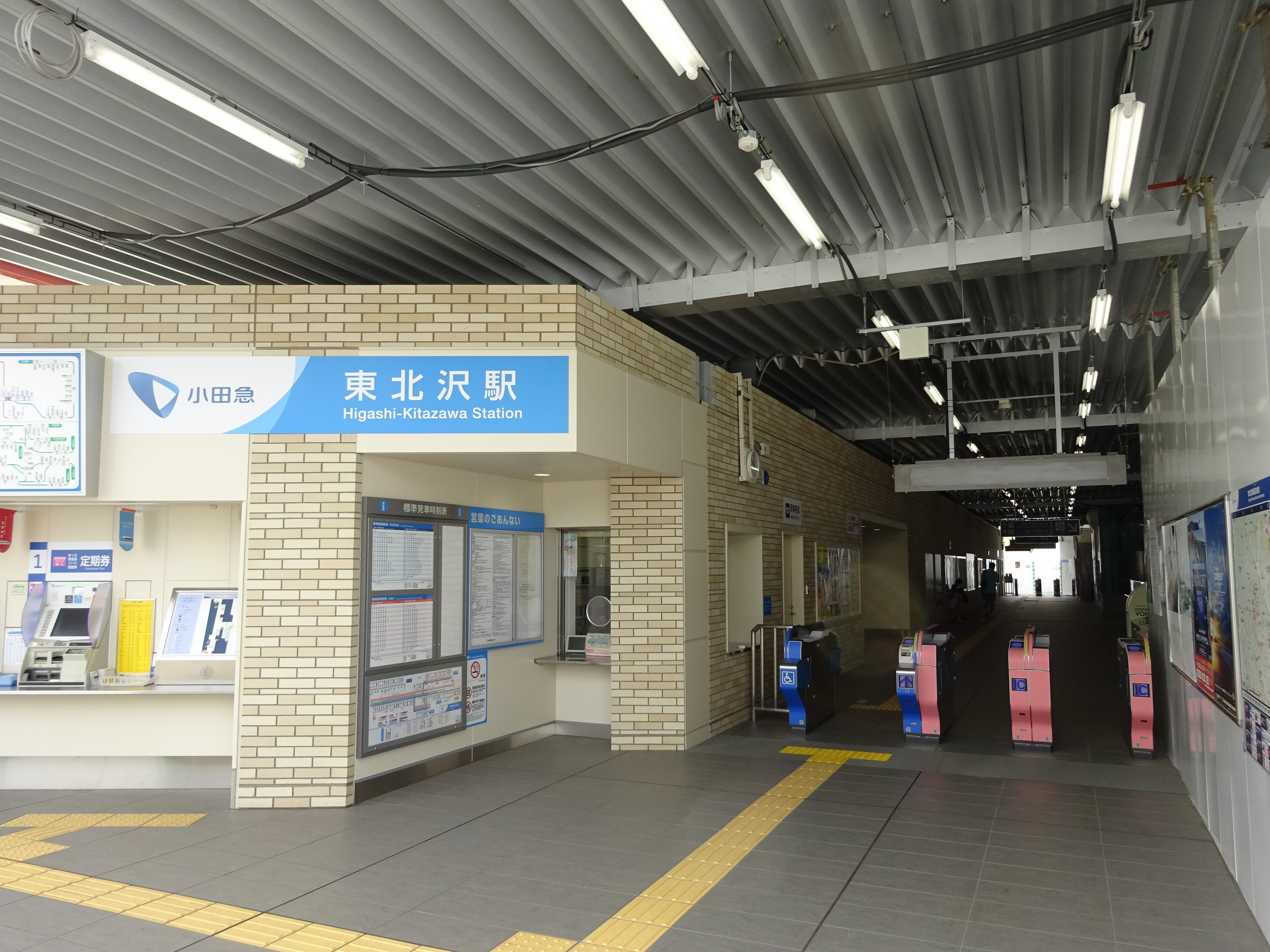
- East Entrance of the station, September 2015

General information
- Location: 3-1-4 Kitazawa, Setagaya, Tokyo; Japan
- Coordinates: 35.6652°N 139.6731°E
- Operator: Odakyu Electric Railway
- Line: Odakyu Odawara Line

Other information
- Station code: OH06

History
- Opened: 1 April 1927; 99 years ago

Passengers
- FY2023: 7,599 daily ▲3.6%
- Rank: 61 out of 70

Services
Preceding station	Odakyu	Following station
Shimo-Kitazawa towards Odawara	Odawara Line Local	Yoyogi-Uehara towards Shinjuku or Yoyogi-Uehara
Location
- Location within Tokyo

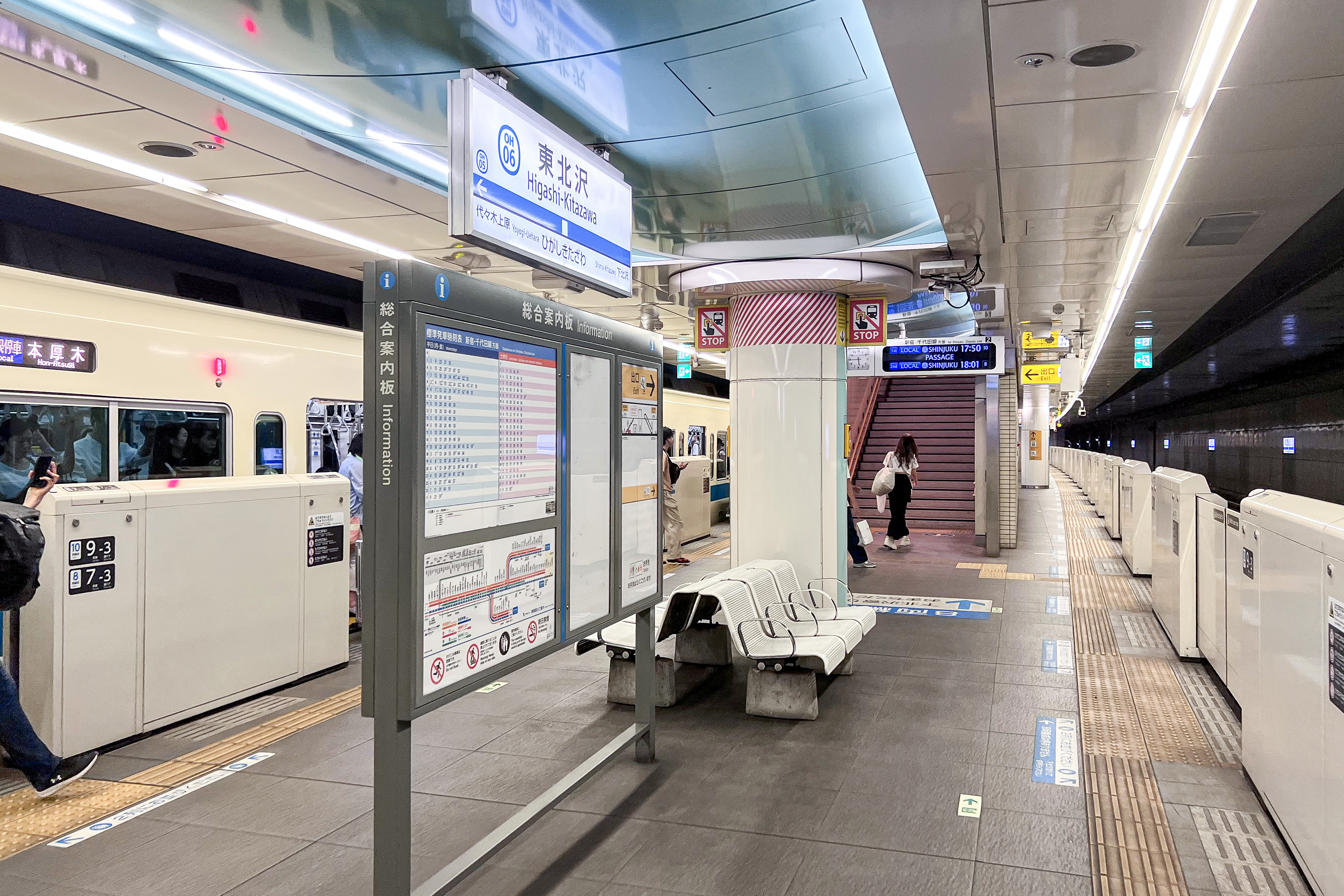
Current platform in August 2023

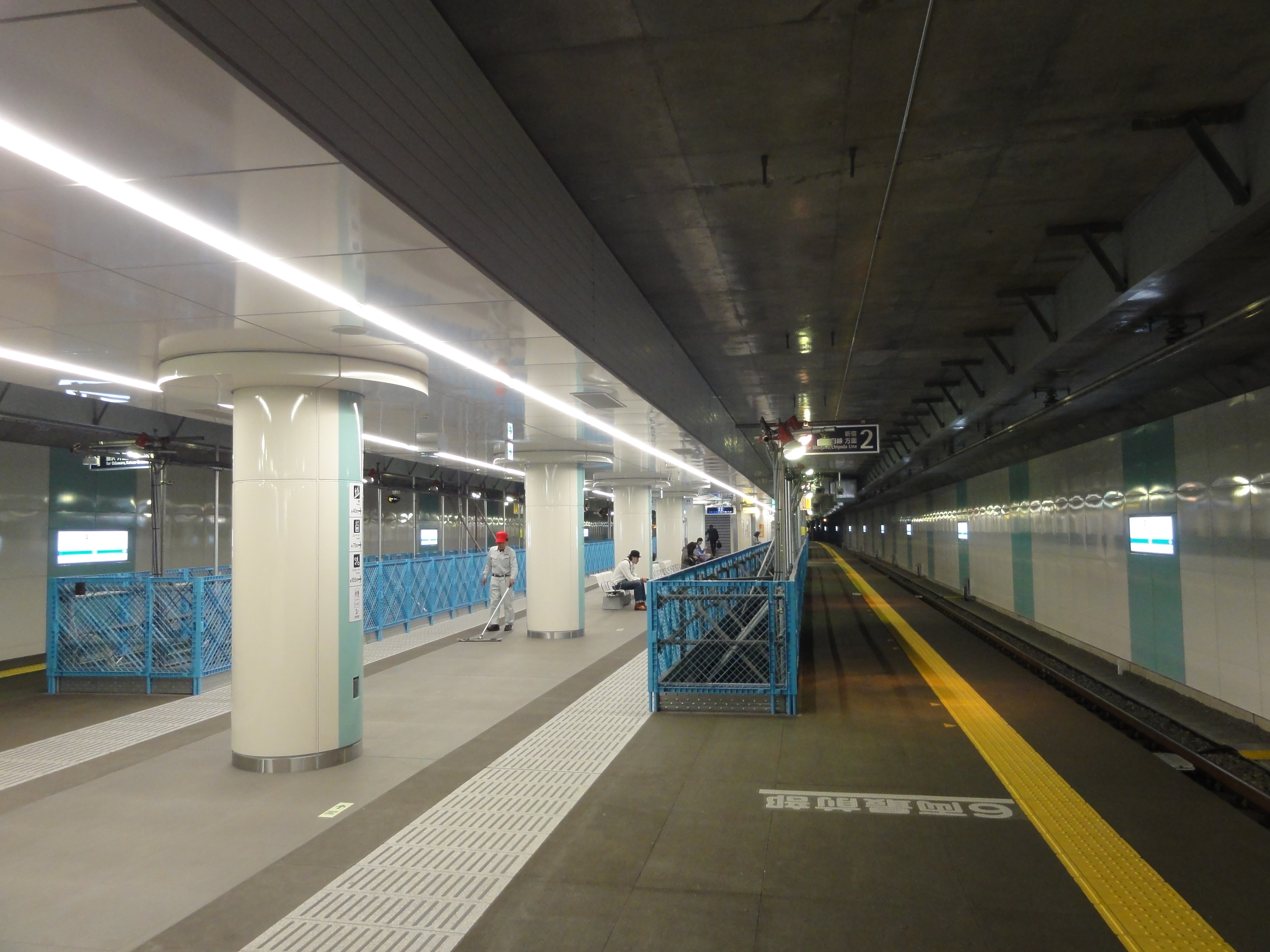
Platform level, April 2013

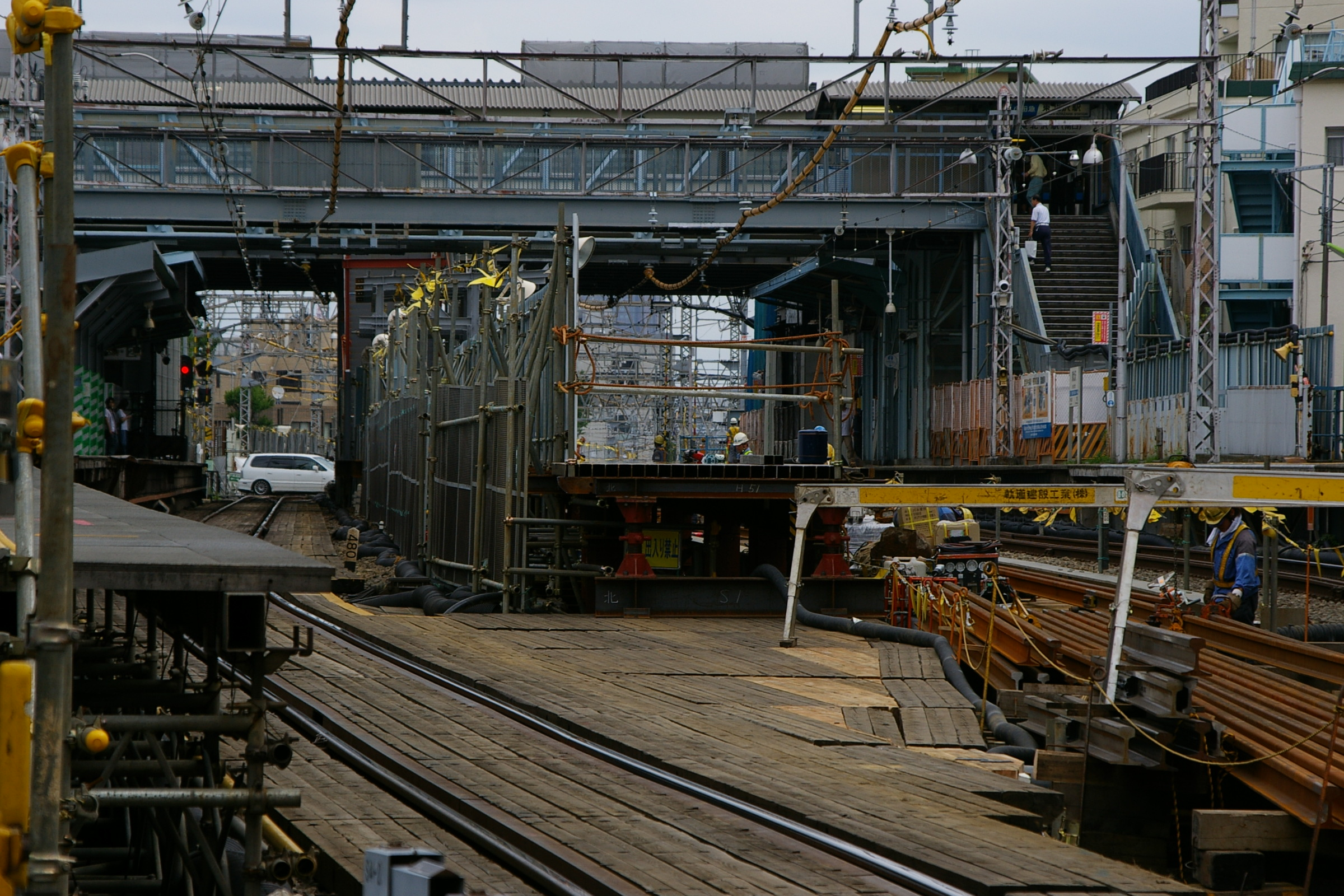
Temporary structures for underground track construction, September 2006

Higashi-Kitazawa Station (東北沢駅, Higashi-Kitazawa eki) is a station on the Odawara Line of the Odakyu Electric Railway, located in Kitazawa, Setagaya, Tokyo.

== History ==
Higashi-Kitazawa Station opened with the line on 1 April 1927. Until 1966, it served freight as well as passengers.

On 1 October 2005, the express tracks through the station were taken out of service, in order to enable work to grade-separate the line and provide continuous quadruple track through Setagaya Ward. The station was moved underground on 23 March 2013, and a new station building opened on 16 May 2015.

Station numbering was introduced in 2014 with Higashi-Kitazawa being assigned station number OH06.

== Station layout ==
The station currently consists of one underground island platform and four tracks. Express trains typically utilize the outer (express) tracks, bypassing the station, while local trains usually stop at the station on the inner (local) tracks.

=== Platforms ===
1	Odakyū Odawara Line	for Machida, Hon-Atsugi and Odawara; Hakone-Tozan Railway for Hakone-Yumoto; Odakyu Enoshima Line for Fujisawa and Katase-Enoshima
2	Odakyū Odawara Line	for Shinjuku; Tokyo Metro Chiyoda Line for Ayase; Joban Line for Abiko and Toride

Until 2005, the station consisted of two side platforms and four tracks, with the inner two used by non-stop trains.

== Services ==
Trains serve this station from 04:55-01:05 every day.

Only local trains stop at this station. The current off-peak service consists of 6 trains per hour to Shinjuku and 6 trains per hour to Hon-Atsugi. Typical journey times are 9 minutes to Shinjuku and 1 hour 20 minutes to Hon-Atsugi (though if passengers change at Shimo-Kitazawa to a Rapid Express, they can reach the latter in as little as 45 minutes). There are few direct services to the Chiyoda Line from this station, but usually passengers have to change at Yoyogi-Uehara.
