= Gōtokuji Station =

Railway station in Tokyo, Japan

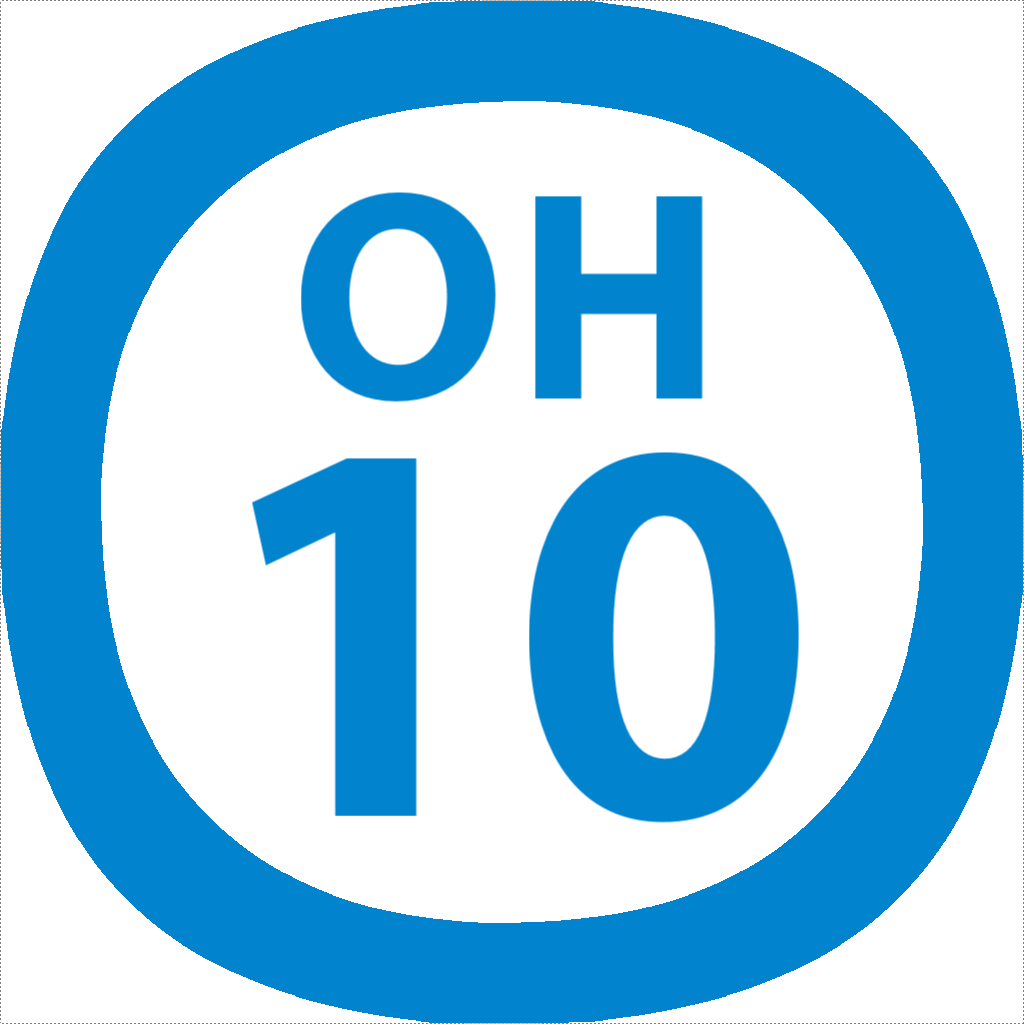
Gōtokuji Station 豪徳寺駅

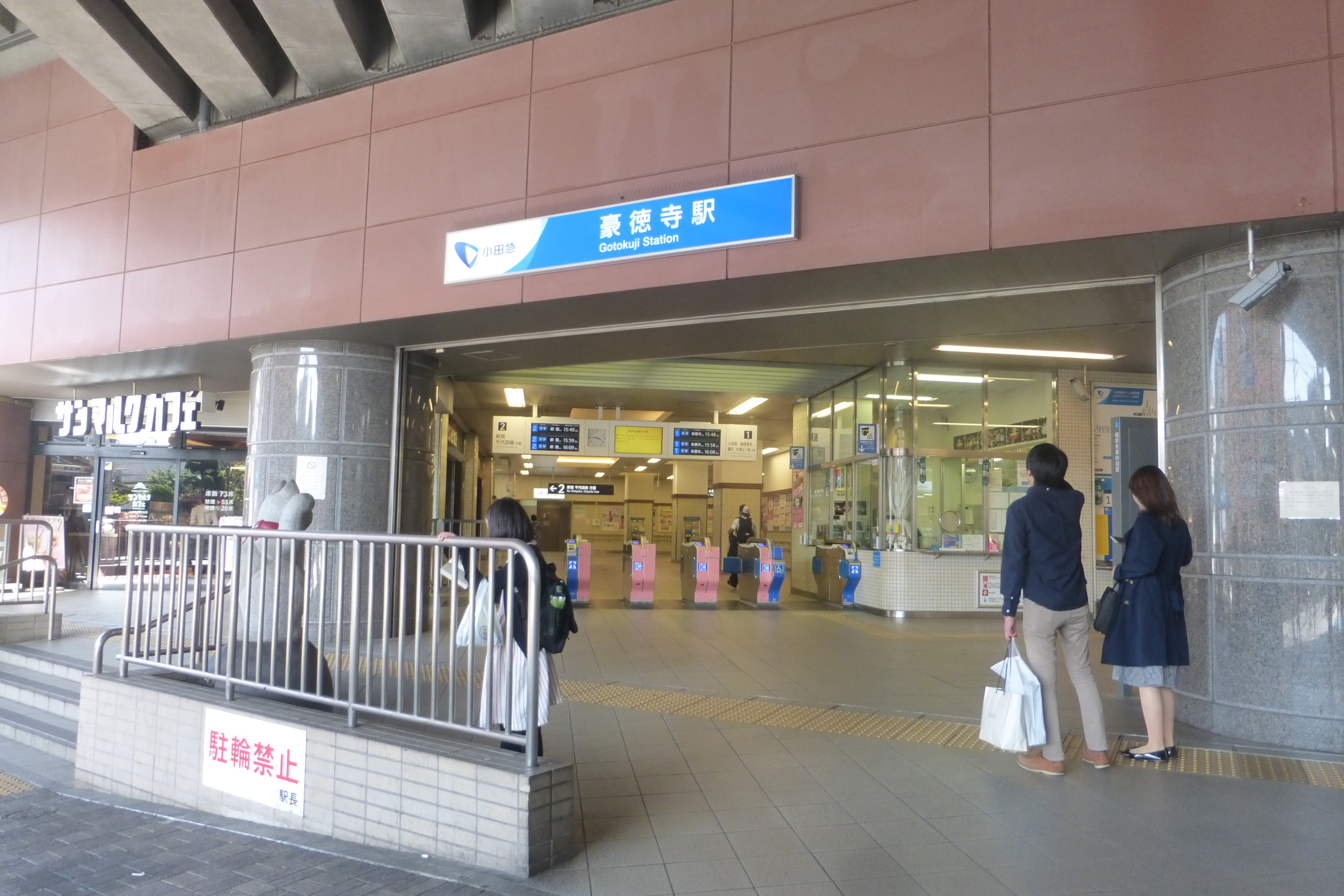
- Station exit in 2017

General information
- Location: 1-43-4 Gotokuji, Setagaya, Tokyo; Japan
- Coordinates: 35.6534°N 139.6473°E
- Operator: Odakyu Electric Railway
- Line: Odakyu Odawara Line

Construction
- Structure type: Elevated

Other information
- Station code: OH10

History
- Opened: 1 April 1927; 99 years ago

Passengers
- FY2023: 26,183 daily ▲7%
- Rank: 40 out of 70

Services
Preceding station	Odakyu	Following station
Kyōdō towards Odawara	Odawara Line Local	Umegaoka towards Shinjuku or Yoyogi-Uehara
Location

Gōtokuji Station (豪徳寺駅, Gōtokuji-eki) is a station on the Odakyu Odawara line, located in Setagaya, Tokyo.

== Station layout ==
The elevated station features four tracks and two side platforms. Express trains typically bypass the station on the two innermost tracks while local trains typically stop at the station on the two outermost tracks.

Before tracks were quadrupled on this section of the Odawara Line in 2004, the station featured two tracks and two side platforms.

=== Platforms ===
1	Odakyū Odawara Line	for Machida, Hon-Atsugi and Odawara; Hakone-Tozan Railway for Hakone-Yumoto; Odakyu Enoshima Line for Fujisawa and Katase-Enoshima
2	Odakyū Odawara Line	for Shinjuku; Tokyo Metro Chiyoda Line for Ayase; Joban Line for Abiko and Toride

== History ==
Station numbering was introduced in 2014 with Gōtokuji being assigned station number OH10.

== Surroundings ==
- Gōtoku-ji (Temple)
- Yamashita Station (Tokyu Setagaya Line)
