= Odakyū Odawara Line =

Railway line in Japan

Odawara Line

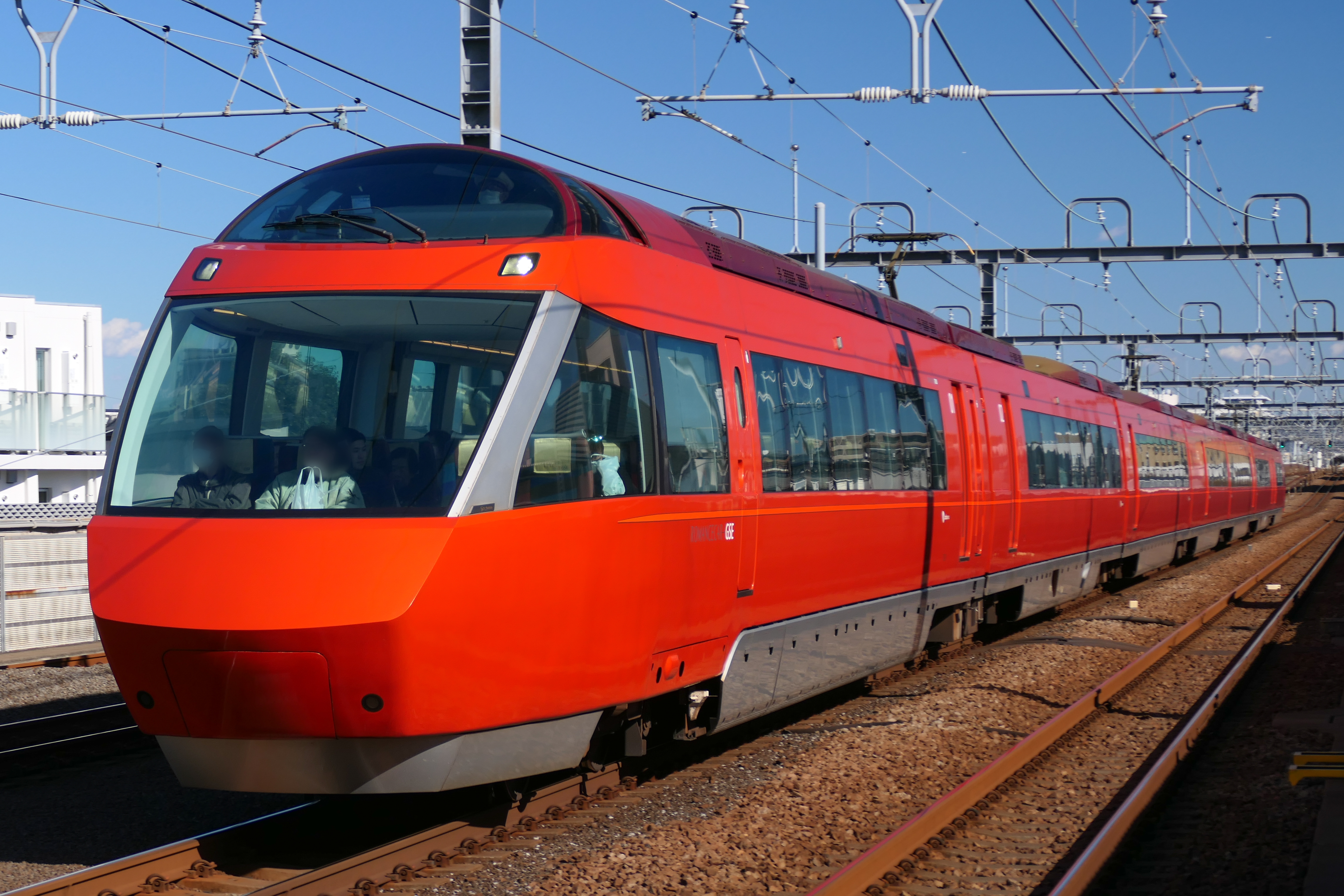
- An Odakyu 70000 series Romancecar GSE limited express

Overview
- Native name: 小田原線
- Status: In service
- Owner: Odakyū Electric Railway Co., Ltd.
- Locale: Tokyo, Kanagawa Prefecture
- Termini: Shinjuku; Odawara
- Stations: 47
- Website: www.odakyu.jp

Service
- Type: Commuter rail
- System: Odakyu Electric Railway
- Route number: OH
- Operator(s): Odakyū Electric Railway Co., Ltd.
- Daily ridership: 1,493,451 (daily, 2010)

History
- Opened: 1 April 1927; 99 years ago

Technical
- Line length: 82.5 km (51.3 mi)
- Track gauge: 1,067 mm (3 ft 6 in)
- Electrification: Overhead line, 1,500 V DC
- Operating speed: 110 km/h (68 mph)
- Signalling: Automatic closed block
- Train protection system: D-ATS-P

The Odawara Line (小田原線, Odawara-sen) is the main line of Japanese private railway operator Odakyu Electric Railway. It extends 82.5 km (51.3 mi) from Shinjuku in central Tokyo through the southwest suburbs to the city of Odawara in Kanagawa Prefecture. From Yoyogi-Uehara Station some trains continue onto the Tokyo Metro Chiyoda Line and beyond to the East Japan Railway Company Joban Line.

== Operation ==
Destinations are from Shinjuku unless otherwise noted. English abbreviations are unofficial.

Limited Express (特急, tokkyū; LE)
Collectively known as "Romancecar" services, an extra seat charge applies for limited express service. Daytime trains run to: Odawara; Katase-Enoshima on the Enoshima Line; Hakone-Yumoto on the Hakone Tozan Railway; and Gotemba on the Central Japan Railway Company Gotemba Line.

Rapid Express (快速急行, kaisoku kyūkō; RE)
No extra charge. Services run to Odawara and Fujisawa on the Odakyu Enoshima Line. All Rapid Express trains bound for Odawara terminate at Shin-Matsuda and continue as Express trains.

Express (急行, kyūkō; E)
Services run to Karakida, with thrice-hourly service between Machida and Odawara.

Commuter Express (通勤急行, tsūkin-kyūkō; CE)
Weekday morning services operate toward Shinjuku from Karakida on the Odakyu Tama Line.

Semi Express (準急, junkyū; SE)
Most services run to Mukōgaoka-Yūen. All services continue on the Tokyo Metro Chiyoda Line, with some trains extending onto the JR Joban Line.

Commuter Semi Express (通勤準急, tsūkin-junkyū; CS)
Weekday morning services run from Hon-Atsugi to the Chiyoda Line.

Local (各駅停車, kakueki teisha; L)
Most services run to Hon-Atsugi; others continue to Odawara, with through service to Katase-Enoshima and the Tama and Hakone Tozan lines. Some services also operate between Odawara and Hakone-Yumoto.

== Stations ==
Notes:

- See the Romancecar article for information on Odakyu Romancecar limited express services.
- Local trains stop at every station.

Legend:

- ● - all trains stop
- ■ - some trains stop
- ｜- all trains pass
- ○ - On Weekdays, Outbound for Hon-Atsugi Evening Rush Hour only.

No.	Name	Distance in km (mi)		Romancecar	Rapid Exp.	Express	Commuter Exp.	Semi Exp.	Commuter Semi Exp.	Transfers	Location	
No.	Name	Between stations	Total	Romancecar	Rapid Exp.	Express	Commuter Exp.	Semi Exp.	Commuter Semi Exp.	Transfers	Location	
OH01	Shinjuku 新宿	—N/a	0.0 (0)	●	●	●	●			Chūō Line (JC05); Chūō–Sōbu Line (JB10); Yamanote Line (JY17); Saikyō Line (JA11); Shōnan–Shinjuku Line (JS20); Marunouchi Line (M-08); Ōedo Line (E-27, Shinjuku-nishiguchi: E-01); Shinjuku Line (S-01); Keiō Line/Keiō New Line (KO01); Shinjuku Line (Seibu-Shinjuku: SS01)	Shinjuku	Tokyo
OH02	Minami-Shinjuku 南新宿	0.8 (0.50)		｜	｜	｜	↑				Shibuya	Tokyo
OH03	Sangūbashi 参宮橋	0.7 (0.43)	1.5 (0.93)	｜	｜	｜	↑				Shibuya	Tokyo
OH04	Yoyogi-Hachiman 代々木八幡	1.2 (0.75)	2.7 (1.7)	｜	｜	｜	↑				Shibuya	Tokyo
↑ All Commuter Semi Express and Semi Express along with some Local and Express trains continue to/from Toride via Chiyoda Line and Jōban Line (Local) ↑											Shibuya	Tokyo
OH05	Yoyogi-Uehara 代々木上原	0.8 (0.50)	3.5 (2.2)	｜	●	●	●	●	●	Chiyoda Line (C-01)	Shibuya	Tokyo
OH06	Higashi-Kitazawa 東北沢	0.7 (0.43)	4.2 (2.6)	｜	｜	｜	↑	｜	↑		Setagaya	Tokyo
OH07	Shimo-Kitazawa 下北沢	0.7 (0.43)	4.9 (3.0)	｜	●	●	●	●	●	Inokashira Line (IN05)	Setagaya	Tokyo
OH08	Setagaya-Daita 世田谷代田	0.7 (0.43)	5.6 (3.5)	｜	｜	｜	↑	｜	↑		Setagaya	Tokyo
OH09	Umegaoka 梅ヶ丘	0.7 (0.43)	6.3 (3.9)	｜	｜	｜	↑	｜	↑		Setagaya	Tokyo
OH10	Gōtokuji 豪徳寺	0.7 (0.43)	7.0 (4.3)	｜	｜	｜	↑	｜	↑	Setagaya Line (Yamashita: SG08)	Setagaya	Tokyo
OH11	Kyōdō 経堂	1.0 (0.62)	8.0 (5.0)	｜	｜	●	↑	●	●		Setagaya	Tokyo
OH12	Chitose-Funabashi 千歳船橋	1.2 (0.75)	9.2 (5.7)	｜	｜	｜	↑	●	●		Setagaya	Tokyo
OH13	Soshigaya-Ōkura 祖師ヶ谷大蔵	1.4 (0.87)	10.6 (6.6)	｜	｜	｜	↑	●	●		Setagaya	Tokyo
OH14	Seijōgakuen-Mae 成城学園前	1.0 (0.62)	11.6 (7.2)	●	｜	●	●	●	●		Setagaya	Tokyo
OH15	Kitami 喜多見	1.1 (0.68)	12.7 (7.9)	｜	｜	｜	↑	●	↑		Setagaya	Tokyo
OH16	Komae 狛江	1.1 (0.68)	13.8 (8.6)	｜	｜	｜	↑	●	●		Komae	Tokyo
OH17	Izumi-Tamagawa 和泉多摩川	0.6 (0.37)	14.4 (8.9)	｜	｜	｜	↑	●	↑		Komae	Tokyo
OH18	Noborito 登戸	0.8 (0.50)	15.2 (9.4)	｜	●	●	↑	●	●	Nambu Line (JN14)	Tama-ku, Kawasaki	Kanagawa
OH19	Mukōgaoka-Yūen 向ヶ丘遊園	0.6 (0.37)	15.8 (9.8)	｜	｜	●	●	●	●		Tama-ku, Kawasaki	Kanagawa
OH20	Ikuta 生田	2.1 (1.3)	17.9 (11.1)	｜	｜	｜	↑	○	●		Tama-ku, Kawasaki	Kanagawa
OH21	Yomiuri-Land-mae 読売ランド前	1.3 (0.81)	19.2 (11.9)	｜	｜	｜	↑	○	●		Tama-ku, Kawasaki	Kanagawa
OH22	Yurigaoka 百合ヶ丘	1.3 (0.81)	20.5 (12.7)	｜	｜	｜	↑	○	●		Asao-ku, Kawasaki	Kanagawa
OH23	Shin-Yurigaoka 新百合ヶ丘	1.0 (0.62)	21.5 (13.4)	●	●	●	●	○	●	Tama Line (OH23; Commuter Express through service to/from Karakida)	Asao-ku, Kawasaki	Kanagawa
OH24	Kakio 柿生	1.9 (1.2)	23.4 (14.5)	｜	｜	｜		○	●		Asao-ku, Kawasaki	Kanagawa
OH25	Tsurukawa 鶴川	1.7 (1.1)	25.1 (15.6)	｜	｜	｜		○	●		Machida	Tokyo
OH26	Tamagawagakuen-mae 玉川学園前	2.8 (1.7)	27.9 (17.3)	｜	｜	｜		○	●		Machida	Tokyo
OH27	Machida 町田	2.9 (1.8)	30.8 (19.1)	●	●	●		○	●	Yokohama Line (JH23)	Machida	Tokyo
OH28	Sagami-Ōno 相模大野	1.5 (0.93)	32.3 (20.1)	●	●	●		○	●	Enoshima Line (OH28; through to/from Katase-Enoshima)	Minami-ku, Sagamihara	Kanagawa
OH29	Odakyū-Sagamihara 小田急相模原	2.4 (1.5)	34.7 (21.6)	｜	｜	｜		○	●		Minami-ku, Sagamihara	Kanagawa
OH30	Sōbudai-mae 相武台前	2.2 (1.4)	36.9 (22.9)	｜	｜	｜		○	●		Zama	Kanagawa
OH31	Zama 座間	2.3 (1.4)	39.2 (24.4)	｜	｜	｜		○	●		Zama	Kanagawa
OH32	Ebina 海老名	3.3 (2.1)	42.5 (26.4)	●	●	●		○	●	■ Sagami Line; Sōtetsu Main Line (SO18)	Ebina	Kanagawa
OH33	Atsugi 厚木	1.6 (0.99)	44.1 (27.4)	｜	｜	｜		○	●	■ Sagami Line	Ebina	Kanagawa
OH34	Hon-Atsugi 本厚木	1.3 (0.81)	45.4 (28.2)	●	●	●		○	●		Atsugi	Kanagawa
OH35	Aikō-Ishida 愛甲石田	3.1 (1.9)	48.5 (30.1)	｜	●	●			●		Atsugi	Kanagawa
OH36	Isehara 伊勢原	3.7 (2.3)	52.2 (32.4)	●	●	●			●		Isehara	Kanagawa
OH37	Tsurumaki-Onsen 鶴巻温泉	3.7 (2.3)	55.9 (34.7)	｜	●	●					Hadano	Kanagawa
OH38	Tōkaidaigaku-mae 東海大学前	1.1 (0.68)	57.0 (35.4)	｜	●	●					Hadano	Kanagawa
OH39	Hadano 秦野	4.7 (2.9)	61.7 (38.3)	●	●	●					Hadano	Kanagawa
OH40	Shibusawa 渋沢	3.9 (2.4)	65.6 (40.8)	｜	●	●					Hadano	Kanagawa
OH41	Shin-Matsuda 新松田	6.2 (3.9)	71.8 (44.6)	｜	●	●				Gotemba Line (Matsuda: CB04)	Matsuda, Ashigarakami; District	Kanagawa
OH42	Kaisei 開成	2.5 (1.6)	74.3 (46.2)	｜	●	●					Kaisei, Ashigarakami; District	Kanagawa
OH43	Kayama 栢山	1.9 (1.2)	76.2 (47.3)	｜	｜	｜					Odawara	Kanagawa
OH44	Tomizu 富水	1.6 (0.99)	77.8 (48.3)	｜	｜	｜					Odawara	Kanagawa
OH45	Hotaruda 螢田	1.4 (0.87)	79.2 (49.2)	｜	｜	｜					Odawara	Kanagawa
OH46	Ashigara 足柄	1.6 (0.99)	80.8 (50.2)	｜	｜	｜					Odawara	Kanagawa
OH47	Odawara 小田原	1.7 (1.1)	82.5 (51.3)	●	●	●				Hakone Tozan Line (OH47; through service); Tokaido Shinkansen; Tōkaidō Line (JT16); Daiyūzan Line (ID01)	Odawara	Kanagawa
↓ Romancecar and local trains continue to/from Hakone-Yumoto via the Hakone Tozan Line ↓

== History ==
The Odawara Express Railway Co. opened the entire line on 1 April 1927 in order to allow for the Emperor's family to travel on the line, though as duplication works were not completed until October that year, there were initial timetable and signalling issues. Although primarily intended as a passenger line, gravel began to be hauled in 1930.

In 1942, the company was forcibly merged by the government with Tokyu Corporation and the line was named the Tokyu Odawara Line. Tokyu was broken up in 1948 and the line was transferred to the newly founded Odakyu Electric Railway Co.

Through operation to the Hakone Tozan Railway's Hakone Tozan Line began in 1950 once dual gauge track was commissioned (the Hakone Tozan Line is 1,435 mm (4 ft 8 1/2 in), the Odawara Line 1,067 mm (3 ft 6 in)). A connecting track was laid in 1955 to Matsuda Station on the Gotemba Line of the (then) Japanese National Railways, and limited express service through to the line started. To function as a bypass to central Tokyo, through service on the Eidan Subway (now Tokyo Metro) Chiyoda Line commenced in 1978 via Yoyogi-Uehara.

Increasing traffic volume since the 1970s led to plans being formed in 1985 for a track upgrading project on the Odawara Line, though land acquisition issues stalled major track expansion work until construction began in 2013; the project is being carried out between Yoyogi-Uehara and Mukōgaoka-Yūen, quadrupling the Odawara Line trackage and stacking the tracks underground, allowing for increased express services. Originally a viaduct was planned but this was changed to underground tracks, and work on the tunnel between Setagaya-Daita and Higashi-Kitazawa was completed in 2018.

=== Former connecting lines ===
- Setagaya-Daita Station: A 1,067 mm (3 ft 6 in) gauge line electrified at 1,500 V DC operated to Shindaita on the Keio Inokashira Line between 1945 and 1952.

== See also ==
- List of railway lines in Japan
