= Seijōgakuen-mae Station =

Railway station in Tokyo, Japan

Coordinates: 35.6399991°N 139.5988083°E

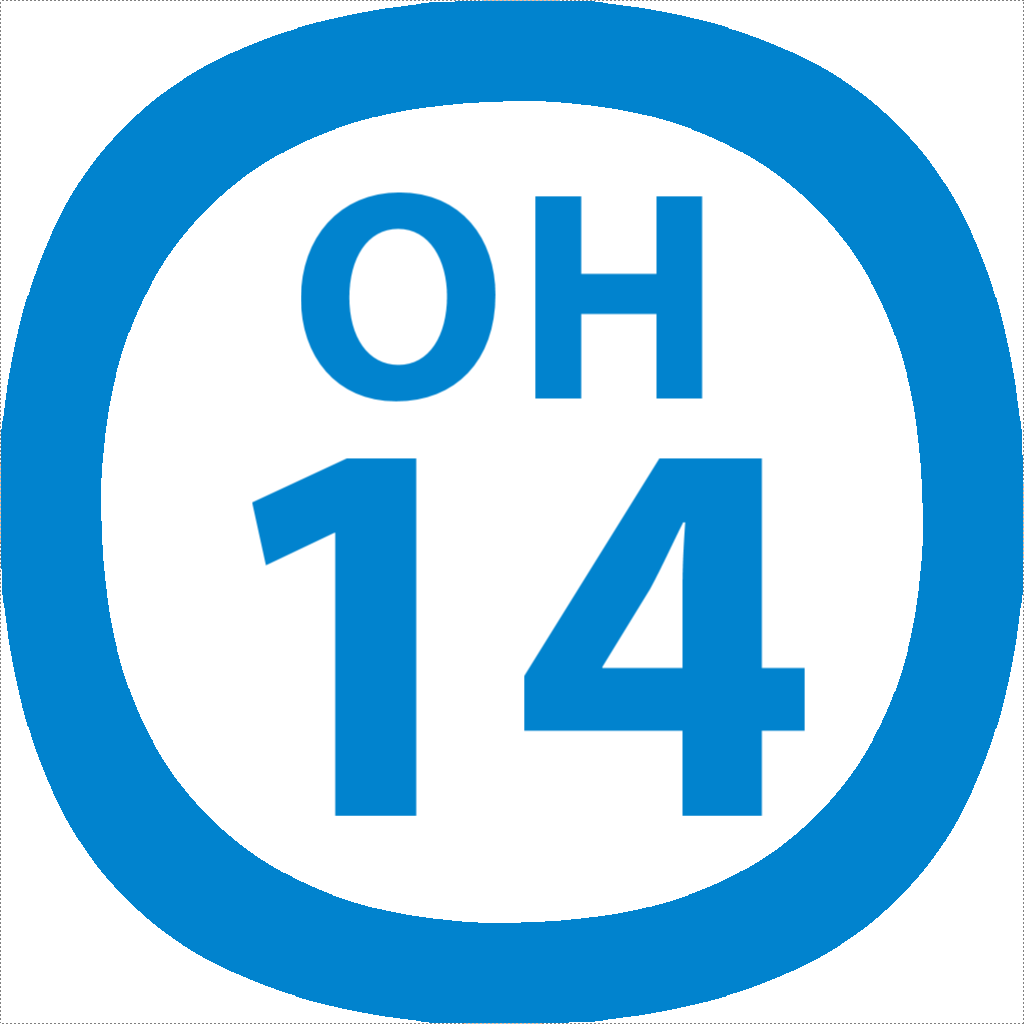
Seijogakuen-mae Station 成城学園前駅

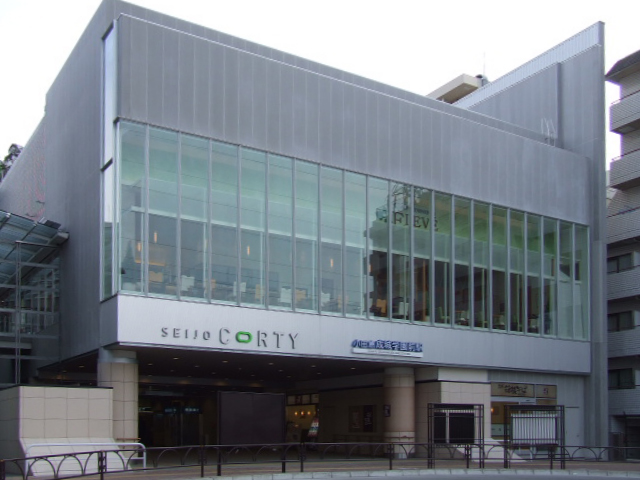
- West Entrance of Seijōgakuen-mae Station

General information
- Location: Setagaya, Tokyo; Japan
- Operator: Odakyu Electric Railway
- Line: Odakyu Odawara Line
- Distance: 11.6 km from Shinjuku
- Platforms: 2 island platforms
- Tracks: 4

Other information
- Station code: OH14

History
- Opened: 1 April 1927; 99 years ago

Passengers
- 88,692 (2019)

Services
Preceding station	Odakyu	Following station
Shin-Yurigaoka towards Hakone-Yumoto, Gotemba or Katase-Enoshima	Romancecar	Shinjuku Terminus
Shin-Yurigaoka towards Hakone-Yumoto, Gotemba or Katase-Enoshima	Romancecar	Omotesandō towards Kita-Senju
Mukogaoka-Yuen One-way operation	Odawara Line Commuter Express	Shimo-Kitazawa towards Shinjuku
Noborito towards Odawara	Odawara Line Express	Kyodo towards Shinjuku or Yoyogi-Uehara
Noborito One-way operation	Odawara Line Commuter Semi Express	Kyodo towards Yoyogi-Uehara
Kitami towards Odawara	Odawara Line Semi Express Local	Soshigaya-Okura towards Shinjuku or Yoyogi-Uehara
Location
- Location within Japan

Seijogakuen-mae Station (成城学園前駅, Seijōgakuen-mae-eki) is a railway station on the Odakyu Odawara Line in Setagaya, Tokyo, Japan, operated by the private railway operator Odakyu Electric Railway. The station is named after the nearby Seijo Gakuen and Seijo University.

== Lines ==
Seijogakuen-mae Station is served by the Odakyu Odawara Line, and lies 11.6 km from Shinjuku Station.

== Layout ==
The station has two island platforms serving four tracks. They are in the basement level.

=== Platforms ===
1	■ Odakyu Odawara Line	Hon-Atsugi, (Enoshima Line) Fujisawa, Katase-Enoshima, (Tama Line) Karakida (Local)
2	■ Odakyu Odawara Line	Odawara, (Enoshima Line) Fujisawa, Katase-Enoshima, (Tama Line) Karakida (Semi-Express, Express, Tama Express, Rapid Express, Romance Car "Metro Sagami", Romance Car "Metro Homeway", Romance Car "Bay Resort")
3	■ Odakyu Odawara Line	Shinjuku, (Tokyo Metro Chiyoda Line) Ayase (Semi-Express, Express, Tama Express, Rapid Express, Romance Car "Metro Sagami", Romance Car "Metro Homeway", Romance Car "Bay Resort")
4	■ Odakyu Odawara Line	Shinjuku

The entrances (North, South and West gates), ticket machines, ticket gates and the station office are on the ground level.

The commercial facilities (Seijo Corty) also start on ground level. Level one and two consist of a supermarket and various shops, level three of community services such as a nursery, cookery and language schools and a gym, and restaurants and an outdoor balcony on level four.

== History ==
Seijogakuen-mae Station opened on 1 April 1927.

Between 1996 and 2004 it was extensively redeveloped and partially moved underground as part of the Odakyu Line's track doubling project.

September 2006 saw the opening of Seijo Corty, a four-storey commercial building.

Station numbering was introduced in January 2014 with Seijogakuen-mae being assigned station number OH14.

== Surrounding area ==
A neighbourhood shopping district surrounds the station, especially outside the North Exit. The film production studios and sound stages of Toho Corporation are located alongside the Senkawa, a tributary of the Tama River that flows South from main station area.

The Sophia Soshigaya International House(祖師谷留学生会館; Soshigaya Ryugakusei Kaikan), a large residential facility for foreign students affiliated with the Sophia University, is about 20 minutes walk north of the station.

== See also ==
- List of railway stations in Japan
