= Chitose-Funabashi Station =

Railway station in Tokyo, Japan

Coordinates: 35.6475°N 139.6243°E

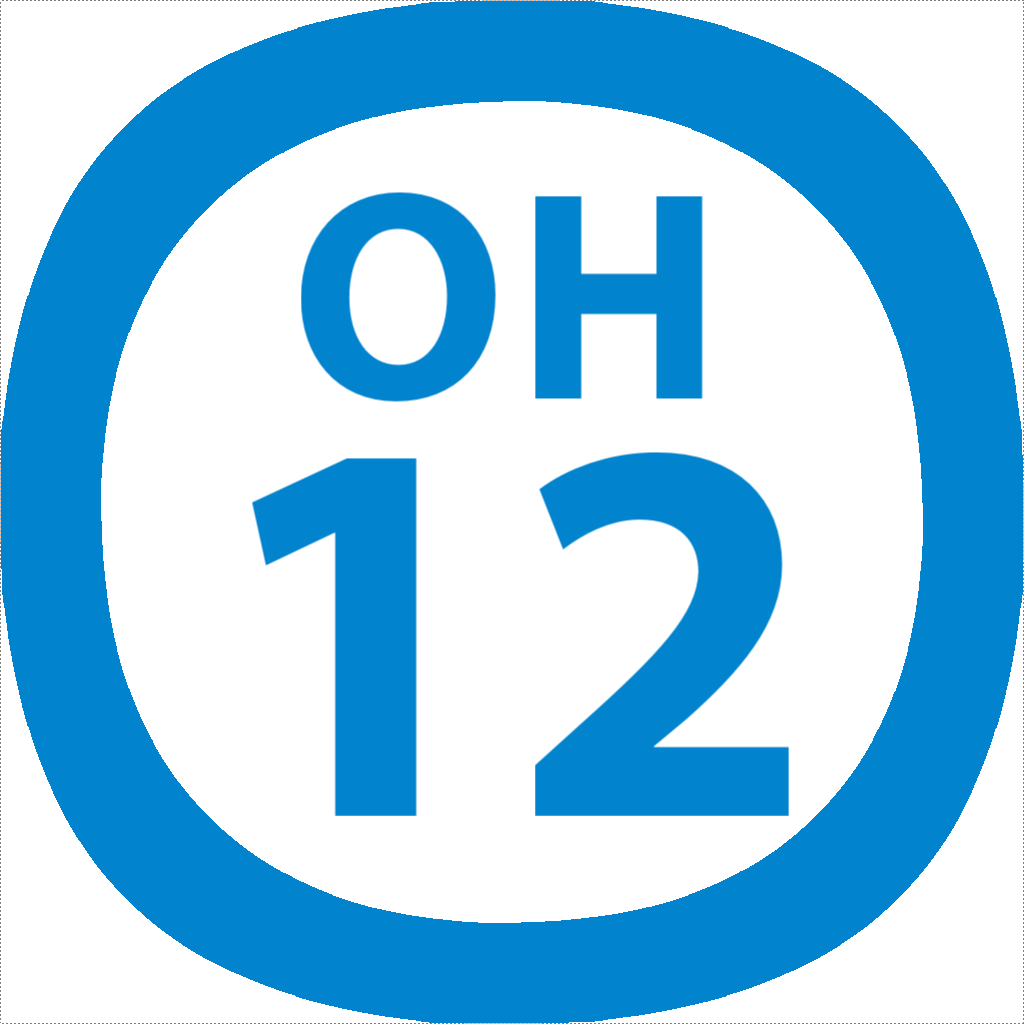
Chitose-Funabashi Station 千歳船橋駅

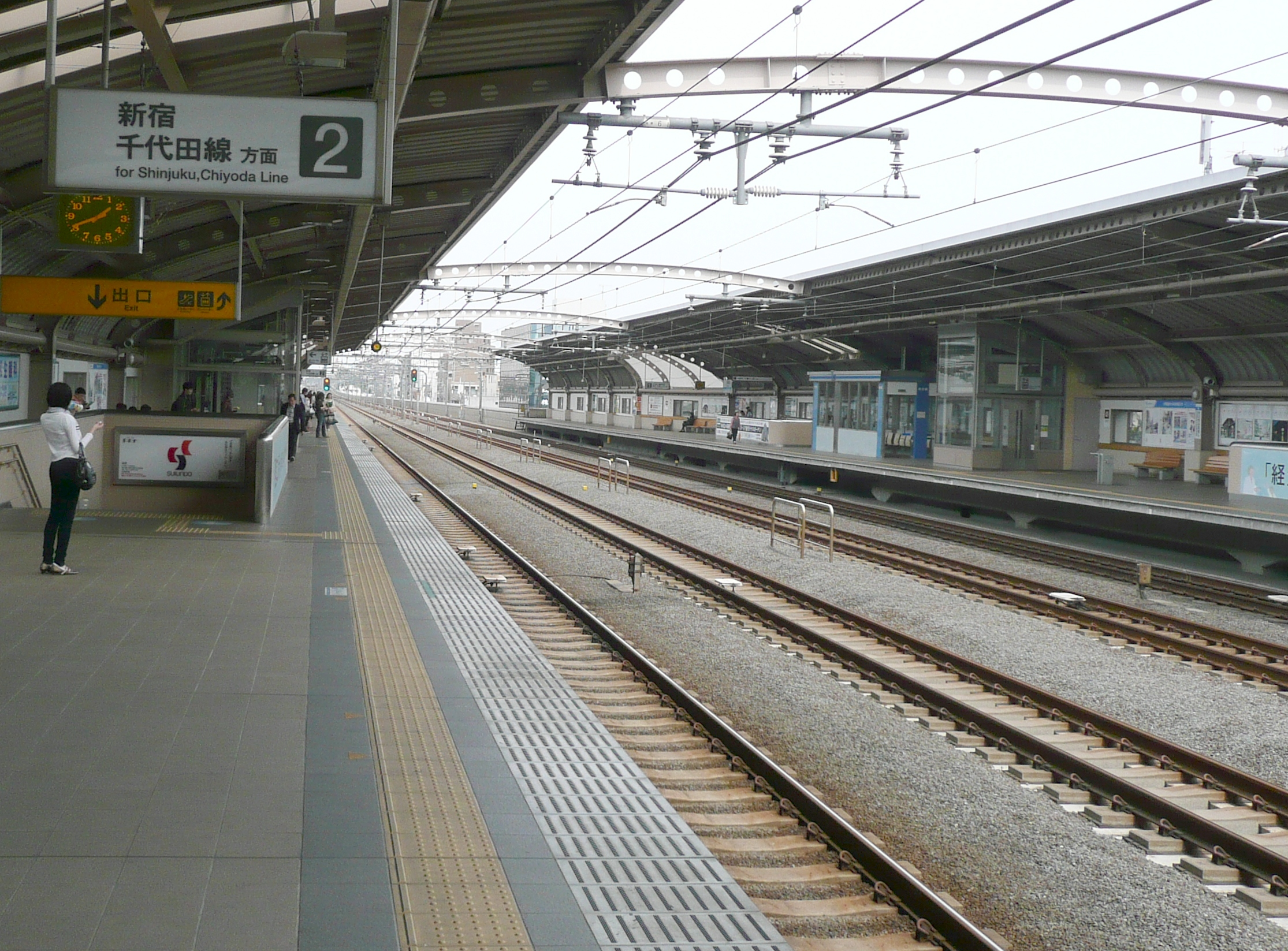
- Station platforms, April 2011

General information
- Location: Setagaya, Tokyo; Japan
- Operator: Odakyu Electric Railway
- Line: Odakyu Odawara Line
- Platforms: 2 side platforms
- Tracks: 4

Construction
- Structure type: Elevated

Other information
- Station code: OH-12

History
- Opened: 1 April 1927; 99 years ago

Passengers
- FY2023: 54,215 daily ▲4.6%
- Rank: 19 out of 70

Services
Preceding station	Odakyu	Following station
Soshigaya-Okura towards Hon-Atsugi	Odawara Line Semi Express	Kyodo towards Yoyogi-Uehara
Soshigaya-Okura towards Odawara	Odawara Line Local	Kyodo towards Shinjuku or Yoyogi-Uehara
Location

Chitose-Funabashi Station (千歳船橋駅, Chitose-Funabashi-eki) is a passenger train station on the Odakyu Odawara Line in Setagaya, Tokyo, Japan, operated by the private railway company Odakyu Electric Railway.

== Station layout ==
The elevated station features four tracks and two side platforms. Express trains typically bypass the station on the two innermost tracks while local and semi-express trains stop at the station on the two outermost tracks, which serve platforms 1 and 2.

Before tracks were quadrupled and elevated on this section of the Odawara Line in 2004, the station was located as street level and featured two tracks and two side platforms.

=== Platforms ===
1	Odakyū Odawara Line	for Machida, Hon-Atsugi and Odawara; Hakone-Tozan Railway for Hakone-Yumoto; Odakyu Enoshima Line for Fujisawa and Katase-Enoshima; Odakyu Tama Line for Karakida
2	Odakyū Odawara Line	for Yoyogi-Uehara and Shinjuku; Tokyo Metro Chiyoda Line for Ayase; Joban Line for Abiko and Toride

== History ==
Chitose-Funabashi Station opened on April 1, 1927.

Station numbering was introduced in 2014 with Chitose-Funabashi being assigned station number OH11.
