= Kyōdō Station =

Railway station in Tokyo, Japan

Coordinates: 35.6512636°N 139.636488°E

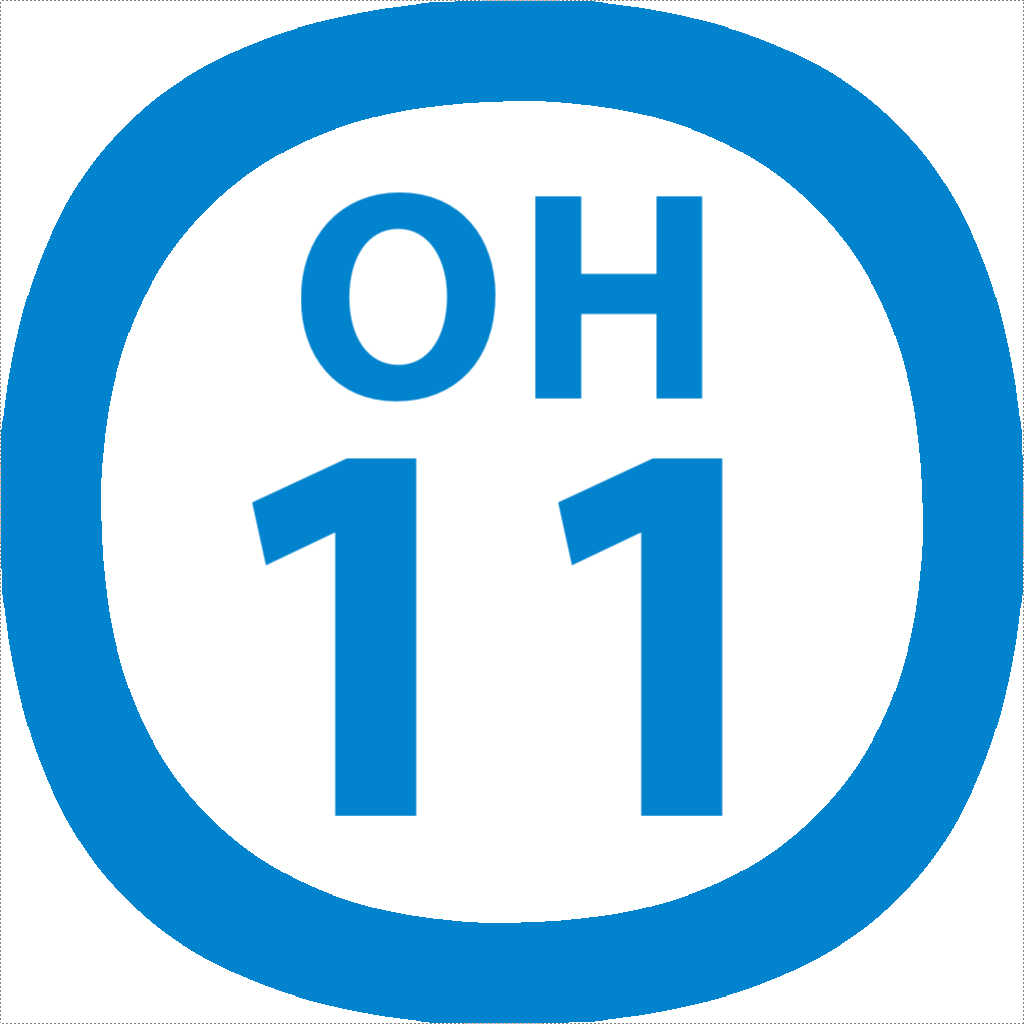
Kyōdō Station 経堂駅

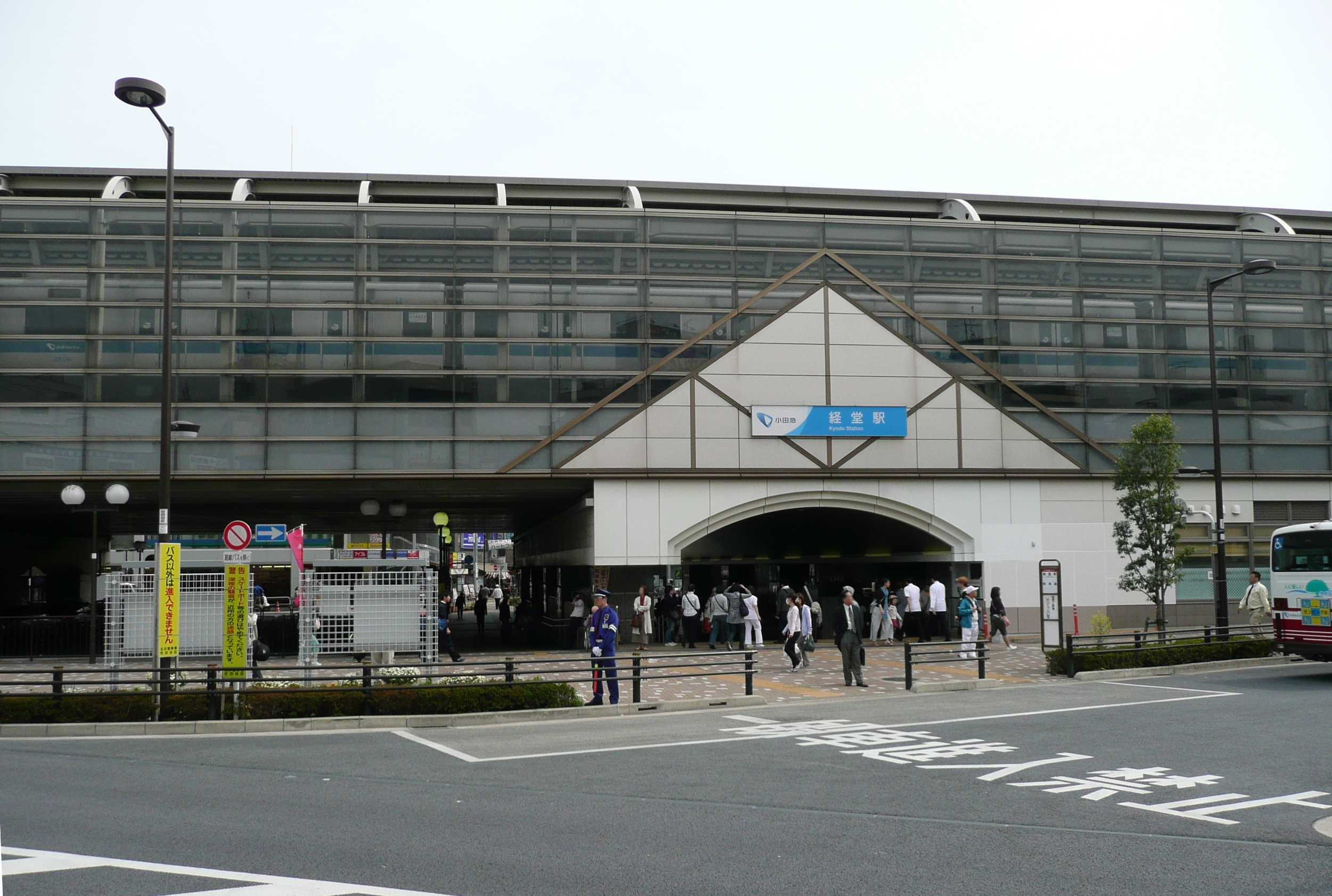
- North side, April 2011

General information
- Location: 2-1-3 Kyōdō, Setagaya, Tokyo; Japan
- Operator: Odakyu Electric Railway
- Line: Odakyu Odawara Line

Other information
- Station code: OH11

History
- Opened: 1 April 1927; 99 years ago

Passengers
- FY2023: 79,305 daily ▲5.3%
- Rank: 14 out of 70

Services
Preceding station	Odakyu	Following station
Seijogakuen-Mae towards Odawara	Odawara Line Express	Shimo-Kitazawa towards Shinjuku or Yoyogi-Uehara
Seijogakuen-mae One-way operation	Odawara Line Commuter Semi Express	Shimo-Kitazawa towards Yoyogi-Uehara
Chitose-Funabashi towards Hon-Atsugi	Odawara Line Semi Express	Shimo-Kitazawa towards Yoyogi-Uehara
Chitose-Funabashi towards Odawara	Odawara Line Local	Gōtokuji towards Shinjuku or Yoyogi-Uehara
Track layout
Location

Kyōdō Station (経堂駅, Kyōdō-eki) is an elevated railway station on the Odakyu Odawara Line in Setagaya, Tokyo, Japan, operated by the private railway company Odakyu Electric Railway.

== Lines ==
Kyōdō Station is served by the Odakyu Odawara Line from Shinjuku in Tokyo and also by Tokyo Metro Chiyoda Line inter-running services which connect to Ayase. Located between Gōtokuji and Chitose-Funabashi, it is 8.0 km (5.0 mi) from the Shinjuku terminus.

The station has two island platforms serving four tracks, with an additional centre track for non-stop trains which bypass the station.

=== Platforms ===
1, 2	Odakyū Odawara Line	for Machida, Hon-Atsugi and Odawara; Hakone-Tozan Railway for Hakone-Yumoto; Odakyu Enoshima Line for Fujisawa and Katase-Enoshima; Odakyu Tama Line for Karakida
3	Odakyū Odawara Line	for Shinjuku; Tokyo Metro Chiyoda Line for Ayase; Joban Line for Abiko and Toride
4	Odakyū Odawara Line	for Shinjuku

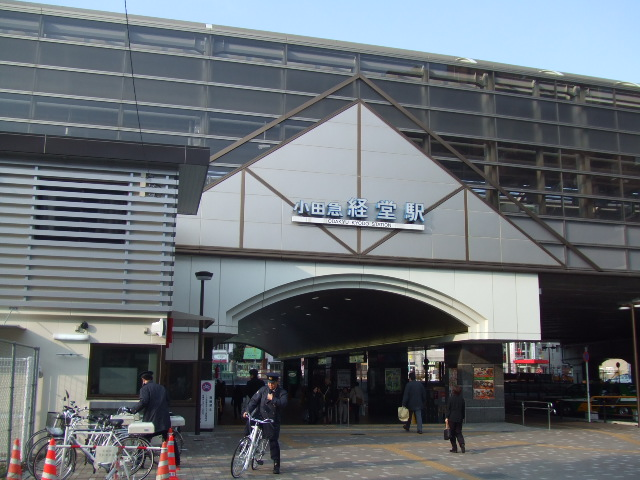
South entrance, January 2007

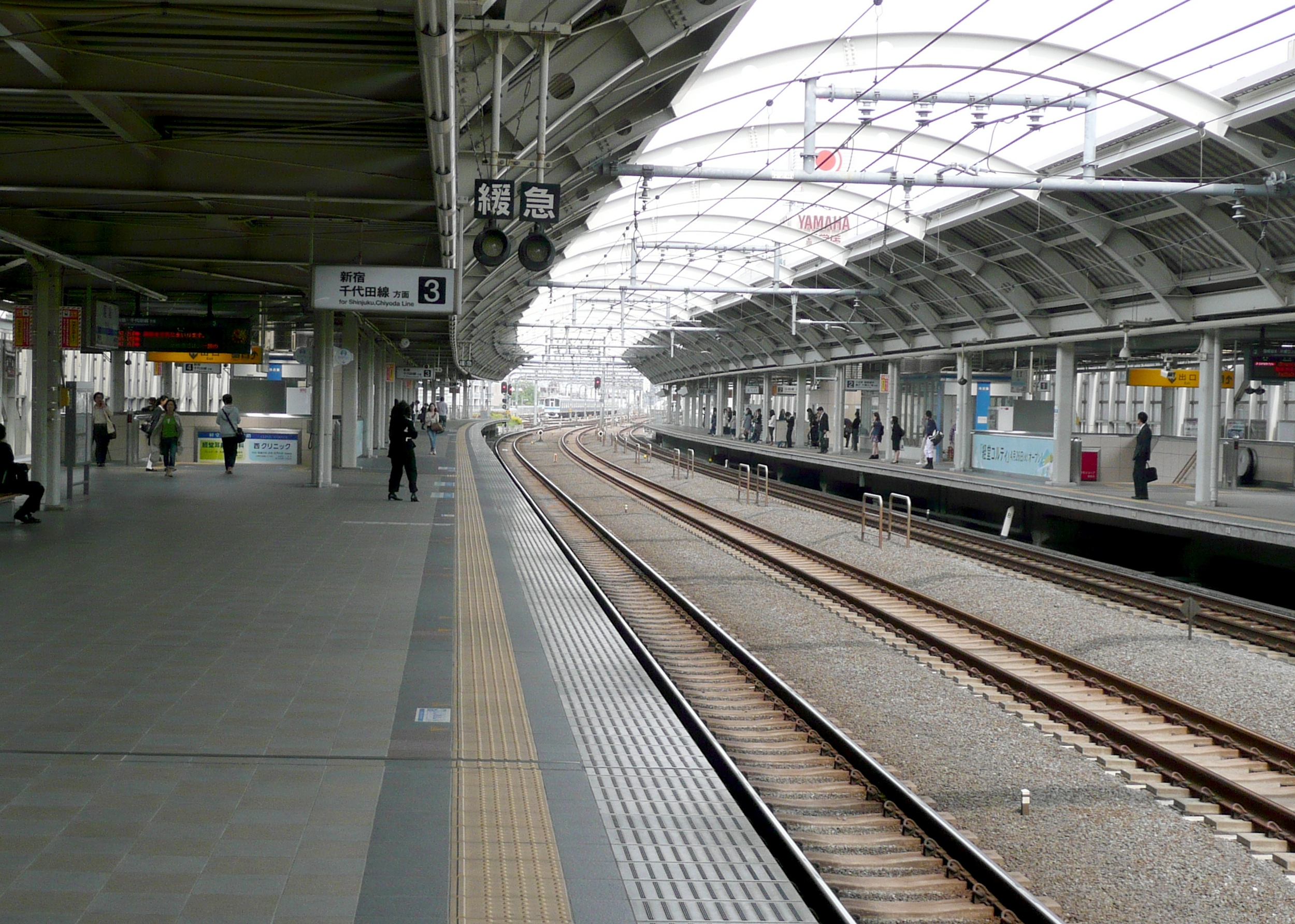
The platforms, April 2011

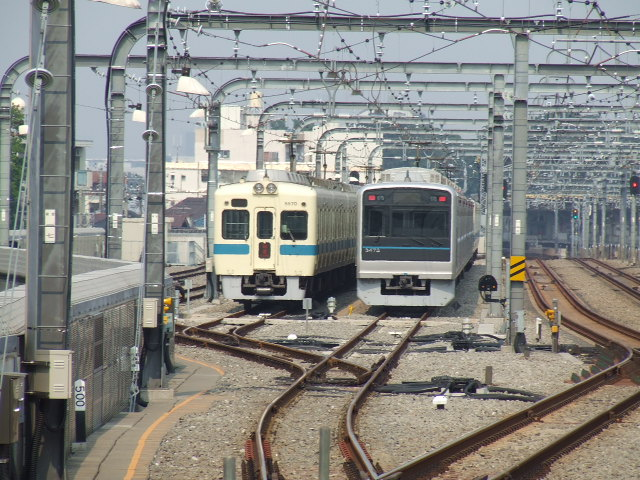
The stabling tracks on the north side of the station, June 2006

== History ==
Kyōdō Station opened on 1 April 1927. The station was rebuilt as an elevated structure on 11 June 2000.

Station numbering was introduced in 2014 with Kyōdō being assigned station number OH11.

== Passenger statistics ==
In fiscal 2011, the station was used by an average of 69,299 passengers daily. In fiscal 2015 the daily passenger numbers increased to 74,691. The average number of passengers had increased to 82,540 by 2021.

== Surrounding area ==
- Tokyo University of Agriculture Setagaya Campus
- Odakyu Hakone Highway Bus, head office

Facilities in the station building

- 7-Eleven
- Starbucks Coffee
- Hakone Soba
- Yokohama Bank ATM
- Japan Post (Yucho Bank) ATM
