= Soshigaya-Ōkura Station =

Railway station in Tokyo, Japan

Coordinates: 35.6431°N 139.6096°E

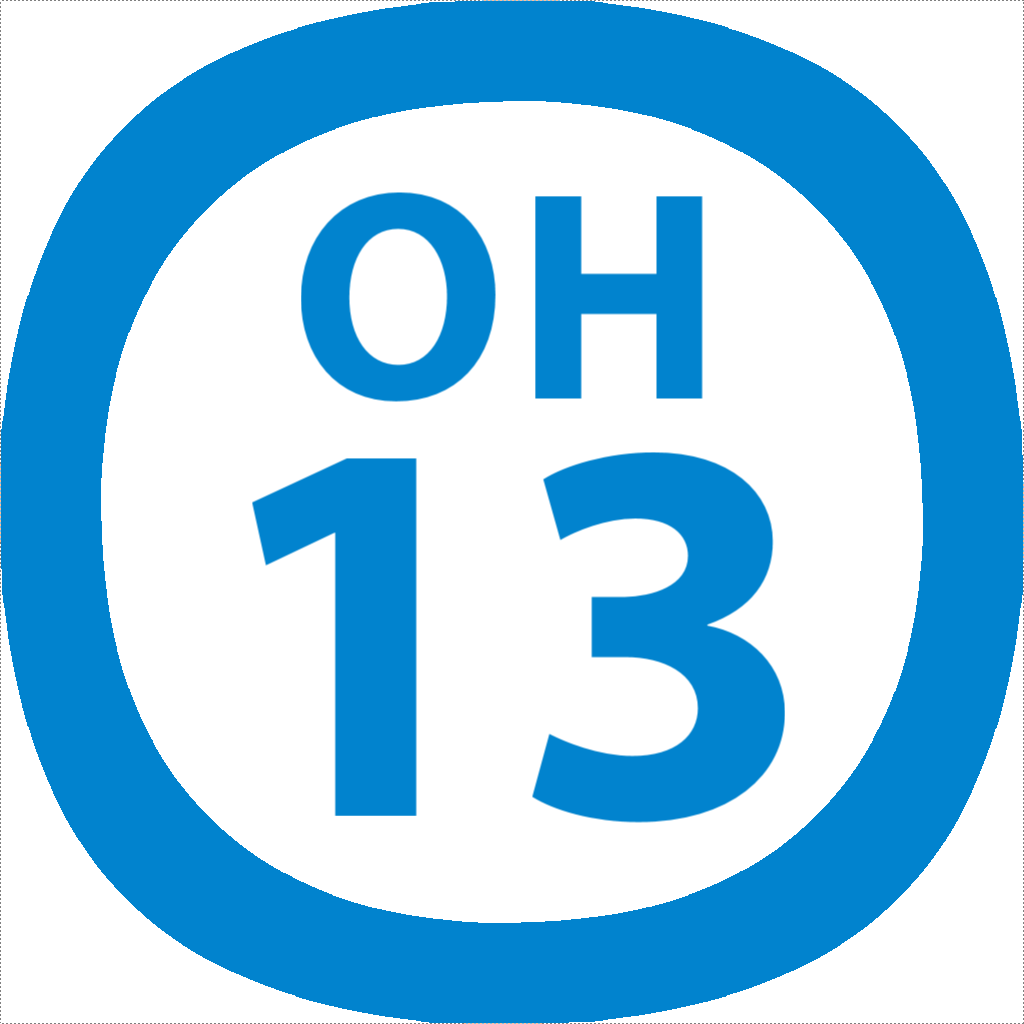
Soshigaya-Ōkura Station 祖師ヶ谷大蔵駅

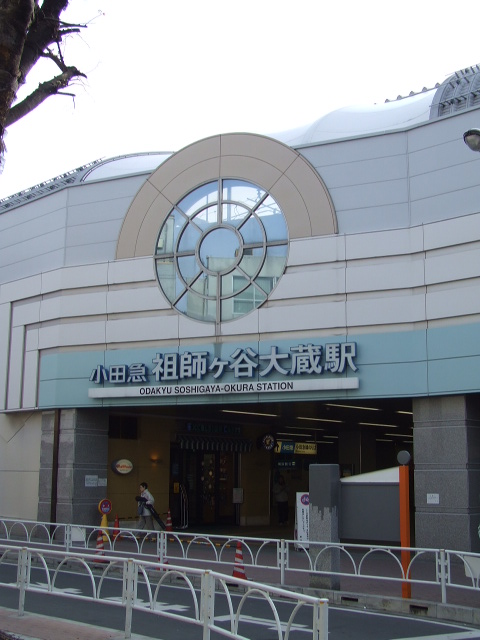
- North Entrance

General information
- Location: Setagaya, Tokyo; Japan
- Operator: Odakyu Electric Railway
- Line: Odakyu Odawara Line

History
- Opened: 1 April 1927; 99 years ago

Passengers
- FY2020: 51085

Services
Preceding station	Odakyu	Following station
Seijogakuen-Mae towards Hon-Atsugi	Odawara Line Semi Express	Chitose-Funabashi towards Yoyogi-Uehara
Seijogakuen-Mae towards Odawara	Odawara Line Local	Chitose-Funabashi towards Shinjuku or Yoyogi-Uehara
Location

Soshigaya-Ōkura Station (祖師ヶ谷大蔵駅, Soshigaya-Ōkura eki) is a stop on the Odawara Line by Odakyu Electric Railway and is located in Setagaya, Tokyo, Japan.

== Station layout ==
The station, which sits on an elevated structure, features four tracks and two side platforms. Express trains typically bypass the station on the two innermost tracks while local and semi-express trains typically stop at the station on the two outermost tracks.

Before tracks were quadrupled on this section of the Odawara Line in 2004, the station featured two tracks and two side platforms. The station was also located at street level.

== History ==
The station opened on 1 April 1927. This is a station of the Odakyu Odawara Line operated by Odakyu Electric Railway Co., Ltd., located 10.6 km (6.6 mi) west of Shinjuku in Setagaya Ward of Tokyo City. The station is surrounded by a residential neighborhood and is well known for the "Ultraman Shopping Street" that extends north from the station. The head office of Tsuburaya Productions - the studio that produces Ultraman - was located nearby the station, and the street was named in 2006 from the connection.

Station numbering was introduced in January 2014 with Soshigaya-Ōkura being assigned station number OH13.
