= Shimo-kitazawa Station =

Railway station in Tokyo, Japan

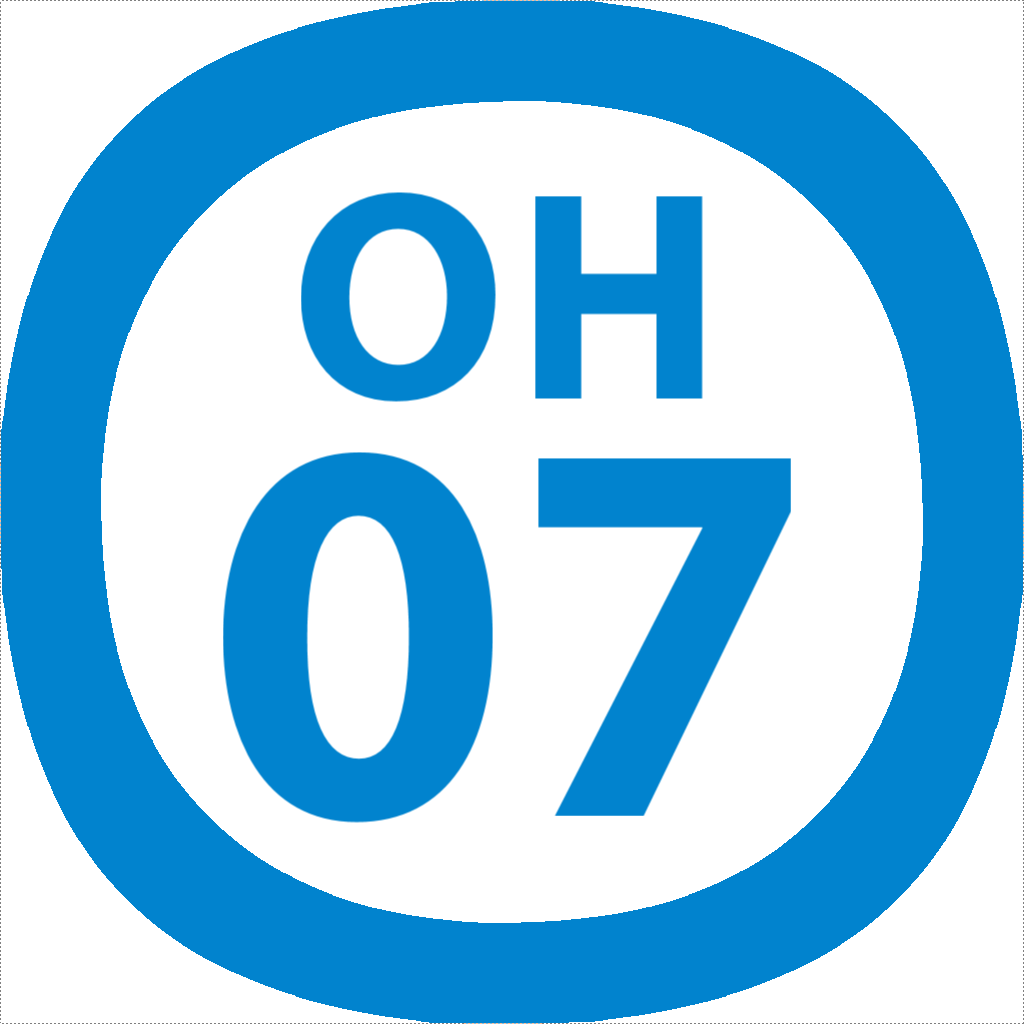
Shimo-kitazawa Station 下北沢駅

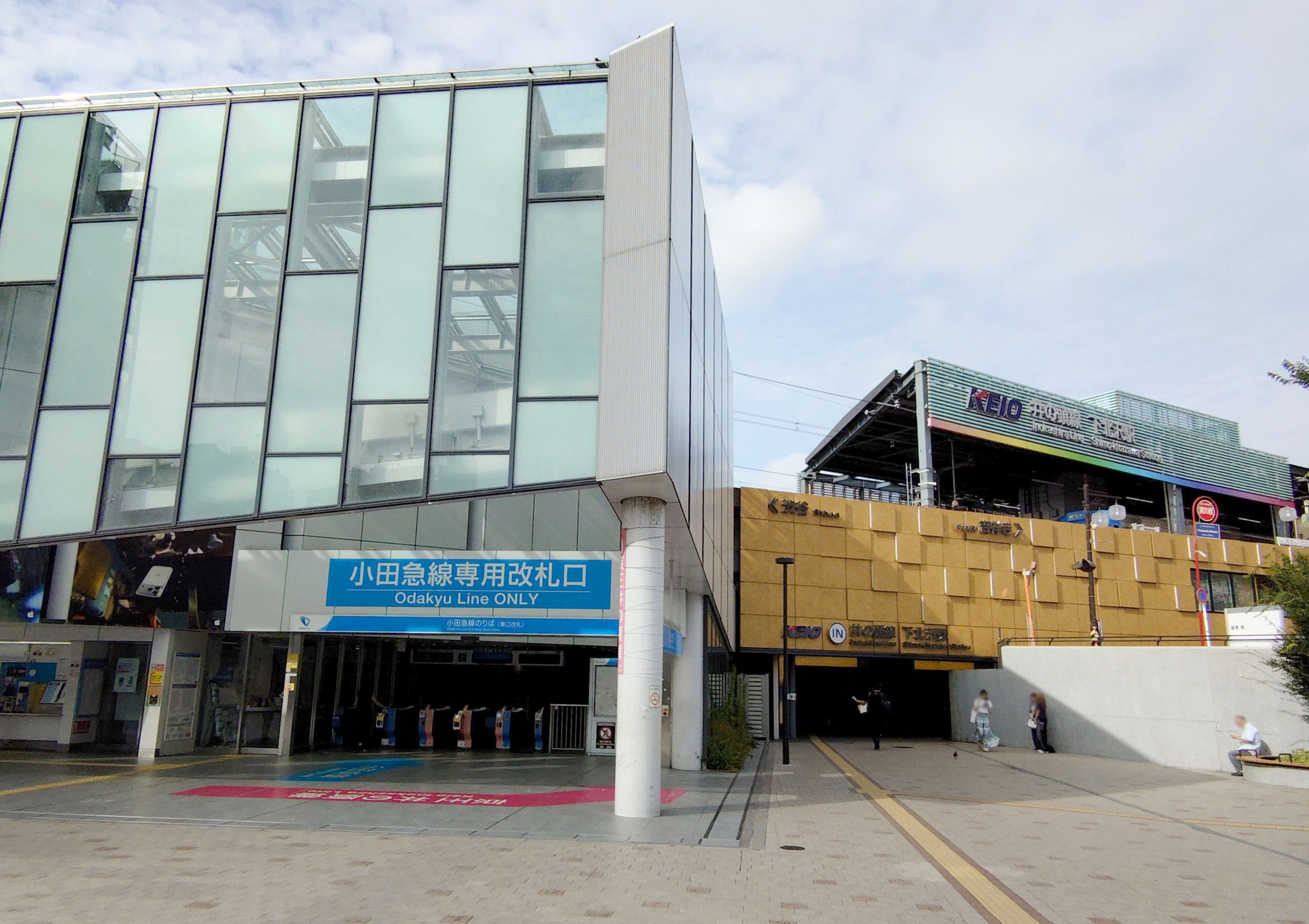
- Shimo-kitazawa Station (Odakyu and Keio Gate) in August 2026

General information
- Location: Setagaya, Tokyo; Japan
- Coordinates: 35°39′41″N 139°40′03″E
- Operator: Odakyu Electric Railway; Keio Corporation
- Lines: Odakyu Odawara Line; Inokashira Line

Other information
- Station code: OH07, IN05

History
- Opened: 1 April 1927; 99 years ago

Passengers
- FY2023: 118,152 ▲6% (Odakyu)
- Rank: 8 out of 70 (Odakyu)
- FY2023: 107,115 ▲4.9% (Keio)

Services
Preceding station	Odakyu	Following station
Noborito towards Odawara	Odawara Line Rapid Express	Yoyogi-Uehara towards Shinjuku
Seijogakuen-Mae One-way operation	Odawara Line Commuter Express	Yoyogi-Uehara towards Shinjuku
Kyodo towards Odawara	Odawara Line Express	Yoyogi-Uehara towards Shinjuku or Yoyogi-Uehara
Kyodo One-way operation	Odawara Line Commuter Semi Express	Yoyogi-Uehara Terminus
Kyodo towards Hon-Atsugi	Odawara Line Semi Express	Yoyogi-Uehara Terminus
Setagaya-Daita towards Odawara	Odawara Line Local	Higashi-Kitazawa towards Shinjuku or Yoyogi-Uehara
Preceding station	Keio Corporation	Following station
Meidaimae towards Kichijōji	Inokashira Line Express	Shibuya Terminus
Shindaita towards Kichijōji	Inokashira Line Local	Ikenoue towards Shibuya
Location
- Location within Special wards of Tokyo Location within Japan

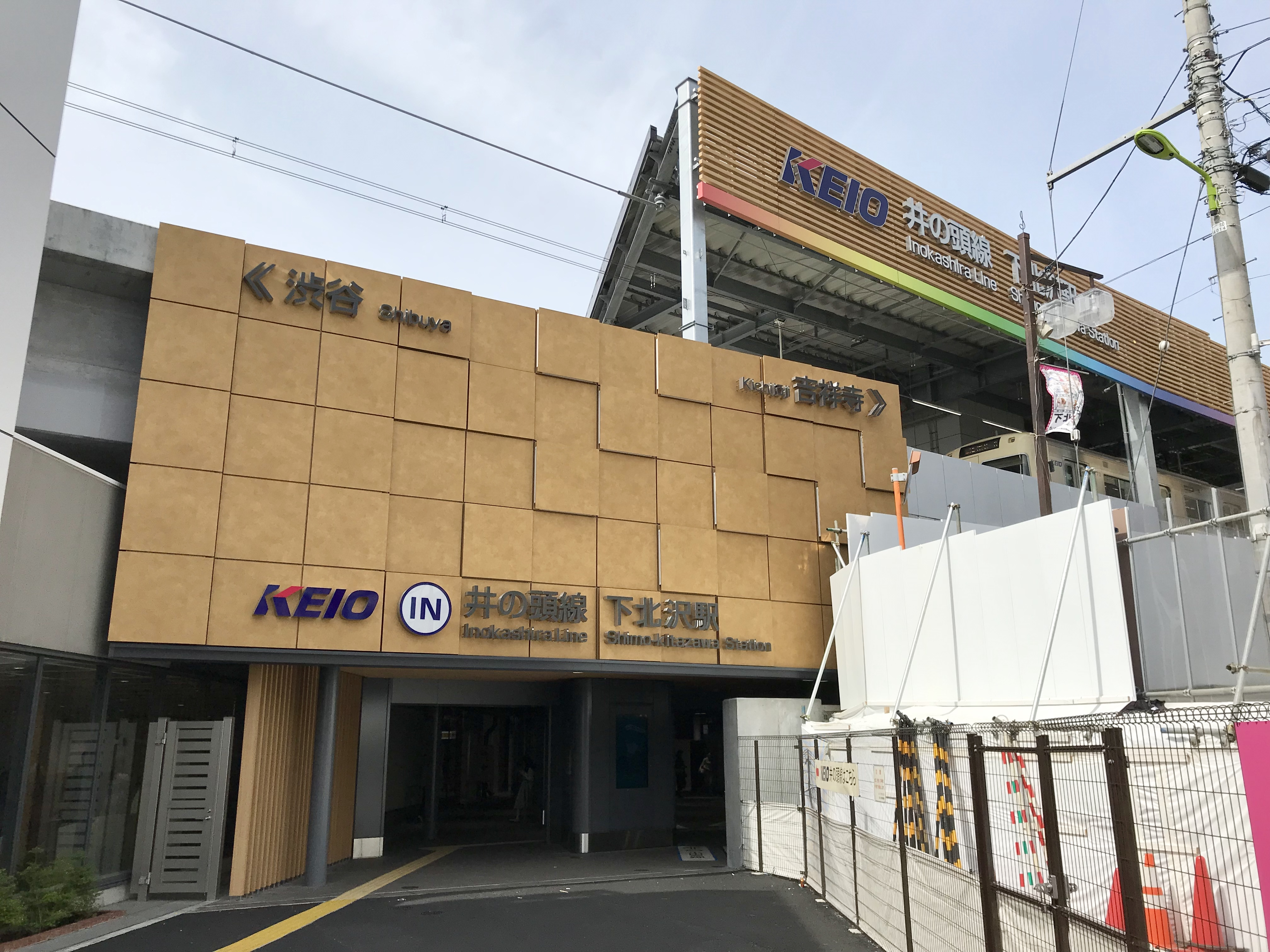
Shimo-kitazawa Station (Keio Central Gate) in May 2019

Shimo-kitazawa Station (下北沢駅, Shimo-kitazawa-eki) is an interchange station on the Odakyu Odawara and the Keio Inokashira lines located in Kitazawa, Setagaya, Tokyo, and jointly operated by the private railway operators Odakyu Electric Railway and Keio Corporation.

The station gives its name to the surrounding Shimokitazawa neighborhood in the southern corner of the Kitazawa district, which is a popular area for young people in large numbers. It includes small independently owned shops, cafes, live music venues and theaters.

== Lines ==
Shimo-kitazawa Station is served by the Odakyu Odawara Line from Shinjuku in Tokyo, and also by the 12.7 km (7.9 mi) Keio Inokashira Line from Shibuya in Tokyo to Kichijōji. Located between Ikenoue and Shindaita, it is 3.0 km (1.9 mi) from the Shibuya terminus of the Inokashira Line.

== Service pattern ==
On the Keio Inokashira Line, both all-stations "Local" services and limited-stop "Express" services stop at this station. On the Odakyu Odawara Line, only Limited Express services pass the station.

== Station layout ==
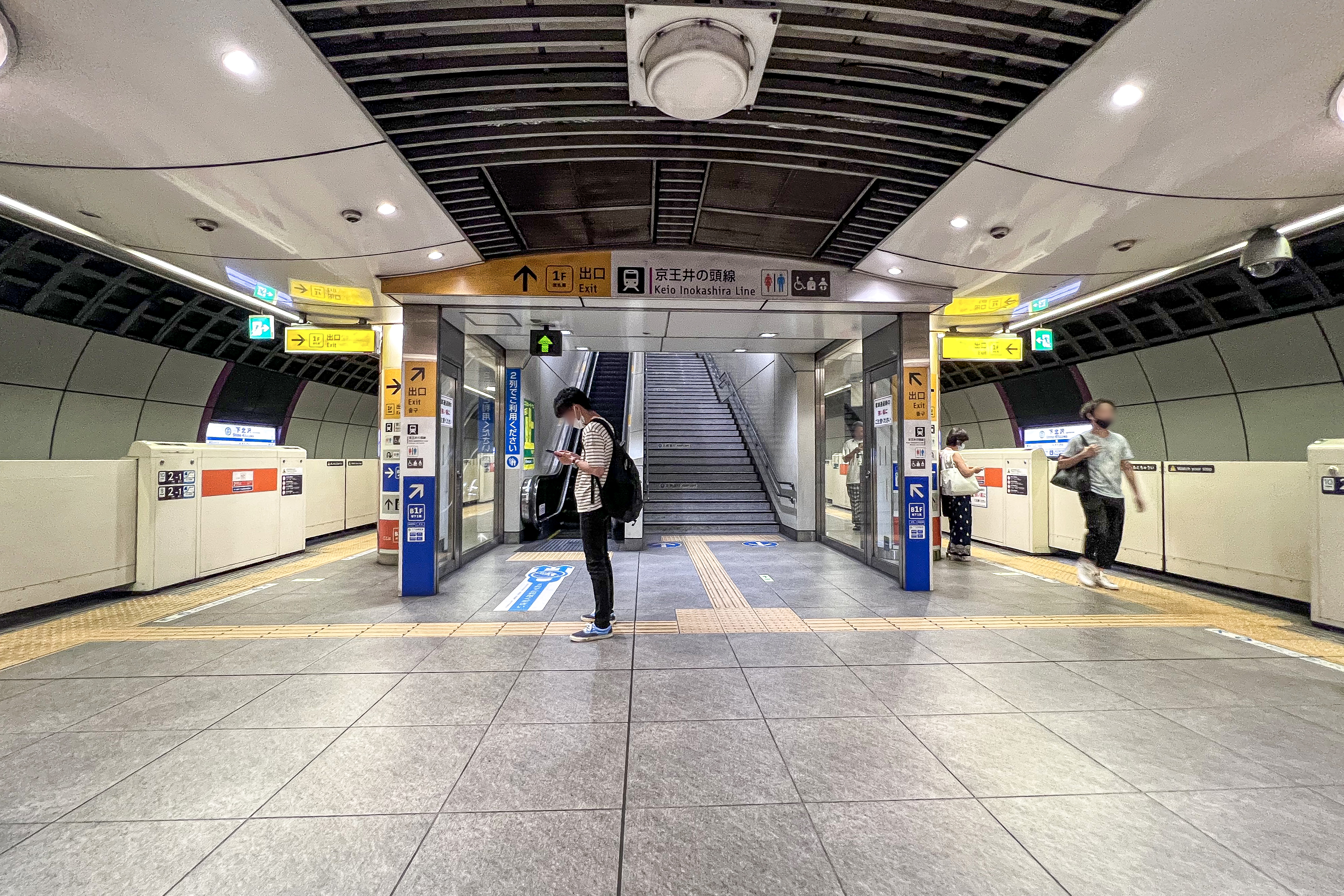
Odakyu Line underground platforms

The Odakyu Odawara and Keio Inokashira lines cross at this station, with the Keio line on elevated tracks above the Odakyu line. After a major station reconstruction project, the Odakyu lines were relocated in March 2013 from their prior surface position to new platforms three stories underground. Additional construction work, ending in 2018, separated the express line trains from the local line trains, one level above. Now, the four-track route that formerly ended at Umegaoka is complete as far as Yoyogi-Uehara station.

An unusual feature of Shimo-kitazawa Station for many years was the use of a single ticket gate serving two independent lines and ticketing systems; this was a legacy of the Inokashira Line's former ownership by Odakyu. Additionally, there were no ticket gates between the two lines. However, as part of a major Station renovation construction project, this was changed in March 2019. Now, both lines have separate entrances and ticket gates, and it is necessary to exit and enter ticket gates in order to switch between lines.

=== Odakyu platforms ===
The Odakyu station consists of two underground island platforms located on the first and second basement levels, serving two tracks each.

==== Basement 2F: express, commuter express, and rapid express ====
1	Odakyū Odawara Line	for Machida, Hon-Atsugi and Odawara; Hakone-Tozan Railway for Hakone-Yumoto; Odakyu Enoshima Line for Fujisawa and Katase-Enoshima
2	Odakyū Odawara Line	for Shinjuku

==== Basement 1F: local, semi-express, express, and commuter semi-express ====
3	Odakyū Odawara Line	for Machida, Hon-Atsugi and Odawara; Hakone-Tozan Railway for Hakone-Yumoto; Odakyu Enoshima Line for Fujisawa and Katase-Enoshima
4	Odakyū Odawara Line	for Shinjuku; Tokyo Metro Chiyoda Line for Ayase; Joban Line for Abiko and Toride

=== Keio platforms ===
The Keio station consists of an elevated island platform serving two tracks.

1	Keio Inokashira Line	for Meidaimae, Eifukuchō, and Kichijōji
2	Keio Inokashira Line	for Shibuya

== History ==
The Odakyu section was opened on 1 April 1927, and the Keio section on 1 August 1933.

From 22 February 2013, station numbering was introduced on Keio lines, with Shimo-kitazawa being assigned station number IN05.

From 23 March 2013, trains used the new underground platforms located on the third basement (B3F) level, and the original ground-level platforms were taken out of service. As of 3 March 2018, platforms on the second basement (B2F) level have opened for use by all-stations services, with the lower platforms used by limited-stop services only.

Station numbering was introduced to the Odakyu platforms in 2014 with Shimo-kitazawa being assigned station number OH07.

== Passenger statistics ==
In fiscal 2011, the Keio station was used by an average of 127,124 passengers daily. The passenger figures for previous years are as shown below.

Fiscal year	Daily average
1999	132,343
2010	128,860
2011	127,124

In the 2015 data available from Japan’s Ministry of Land, Infrastructure, Transport and Tourism, Shimo-kitazawa → Takadanobaba was one of the train segments among Tokyo's most crowded train lines during rush hour.

== Surrounding area ==
- Setagaya Ward Office

== See also ==
- List of railway stations in Japan
