= Shindaita Station =

Railway station in Setagaya, Tokyo, Japan

Coordinates: 35.6626°N 139.6605°E

Shindaita Station 新代田駅

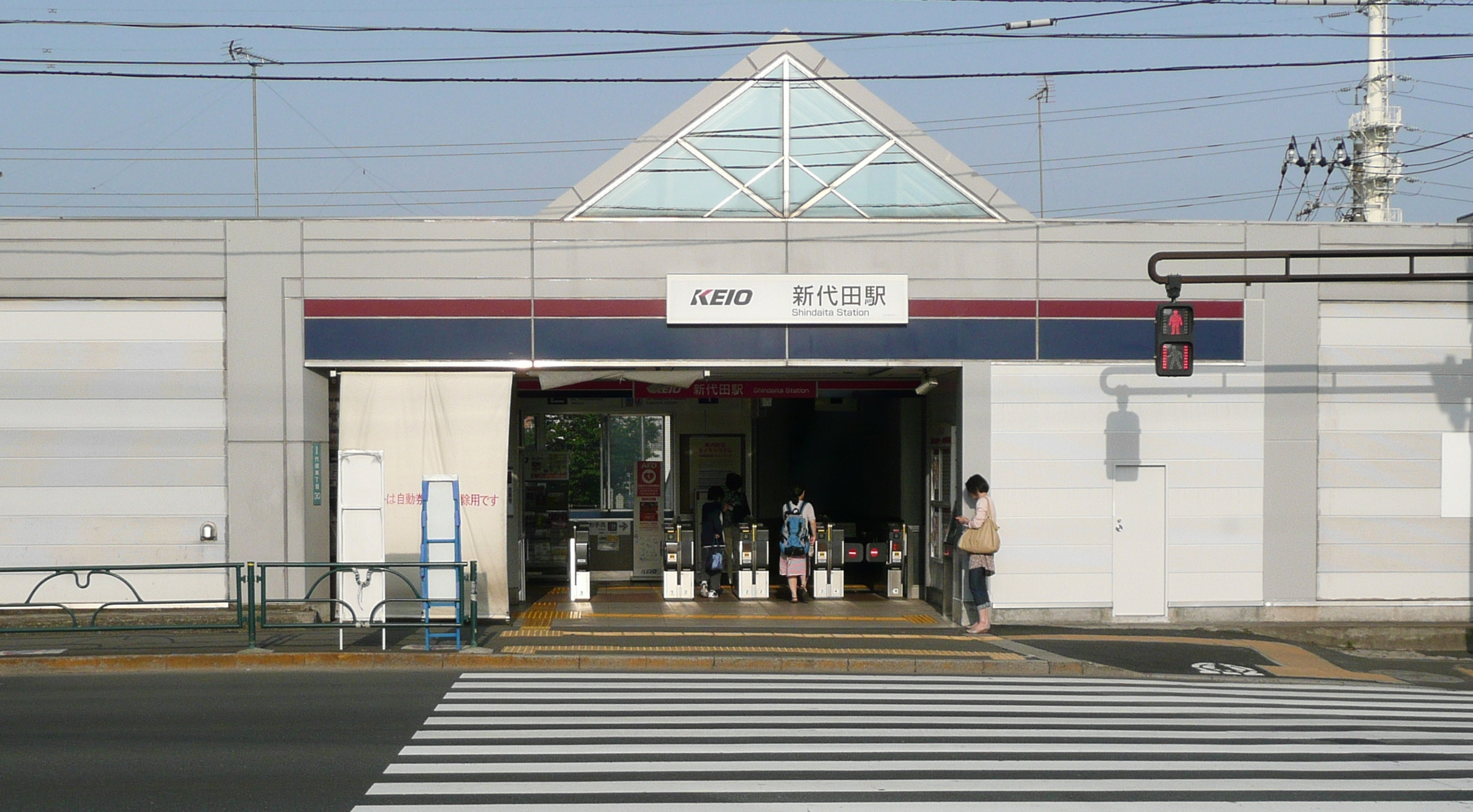
- Station entrance, May 2011

General information
- Location: Setagaya, Tokyo; Japan
- Operator: Keio Corporation
- Line: Keio Inokashira Line
- Connections: Bus stop

Other information
- Station code: IN06

History
- Opened: August 1, 1933; 93 years ago
- Former names: Daita-Nichōme (until 1966)

Passengers
- FY2011: 8,288 daily

Services
Preceding station	Keio Corporation	Following station
Higashi-matsubara towards Kichijōji	Inokashira Line Local	Shimo-kitazawa towards Shibuya
Location

Shindaita Station (新代田駅, Shindaita-eki) is a railway station on the Keio Inokashira Line in Setagaya, Tokyo, Japan, operated by the private railway operator Keio Corporation.

== Lines ==
Shindaita Station is served by the 12.7 km Keio Inokashira Line from Shibuya in Tokyo to Kichijōji. Located between Shimo-Kitazawa and Higashi-Matsubara, it is 3.5 km from the Shibuya terminus.

== Service pattern ==
Only all-stations "Local" services stop at this station.

== Station layout ==
The station has two ground-level opposing side platforms on either side of the two tracks, which are side by side. The station building is built above the tracks. The platforms, however, are built in a cutting, over which runs prefectural road 318 (Kannana Doori Ave (環七通り, kannana dōri)); for this reason part of the platform is located under this road. The ticket gates are located alongside the road.

Between the ticket gates and platform there is a wheelchair escalator as well as an elevator. The toilets are located on platform 1, and include a multi-purpose toilet.

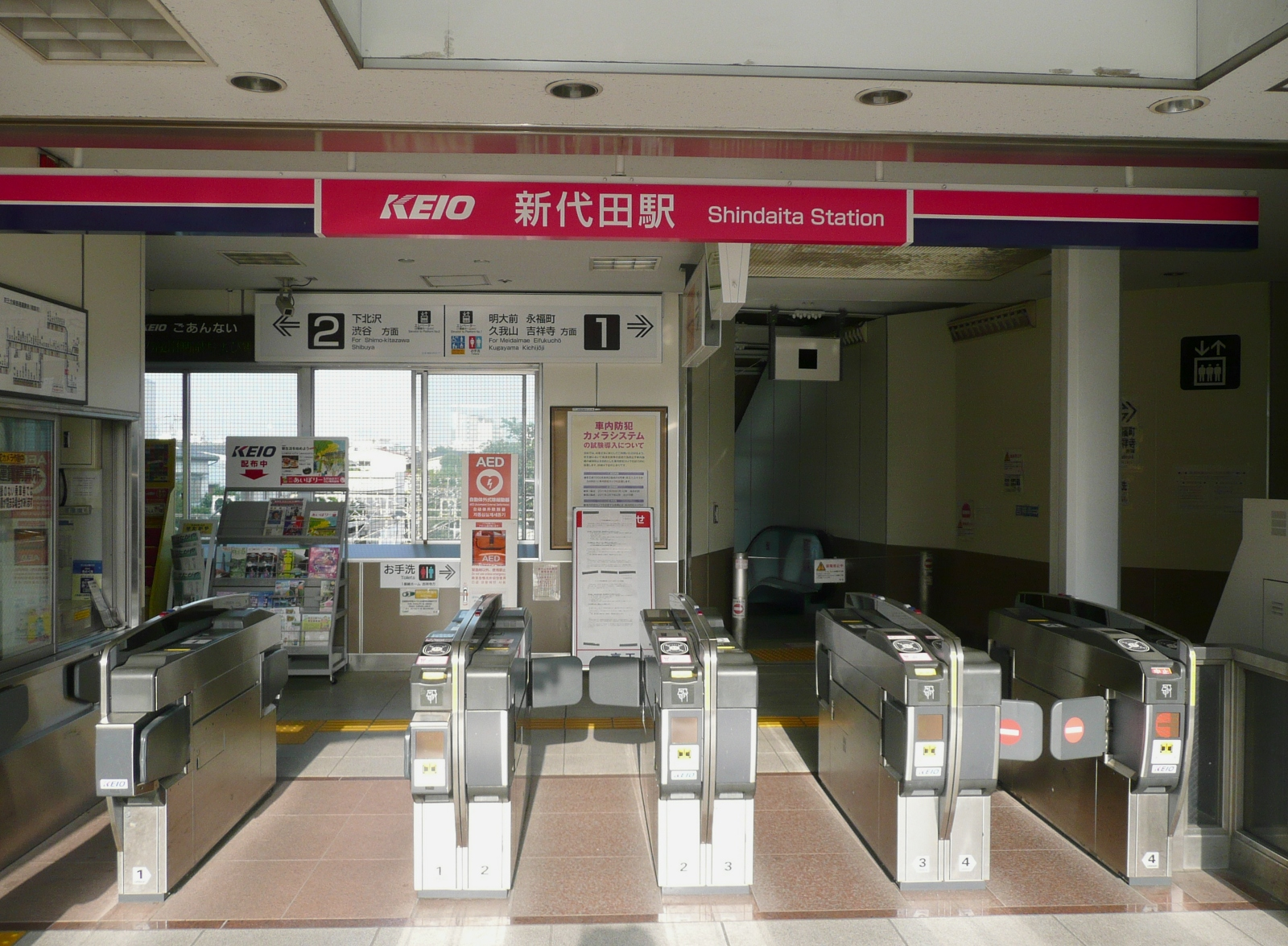
The ticket barriers, May 2011

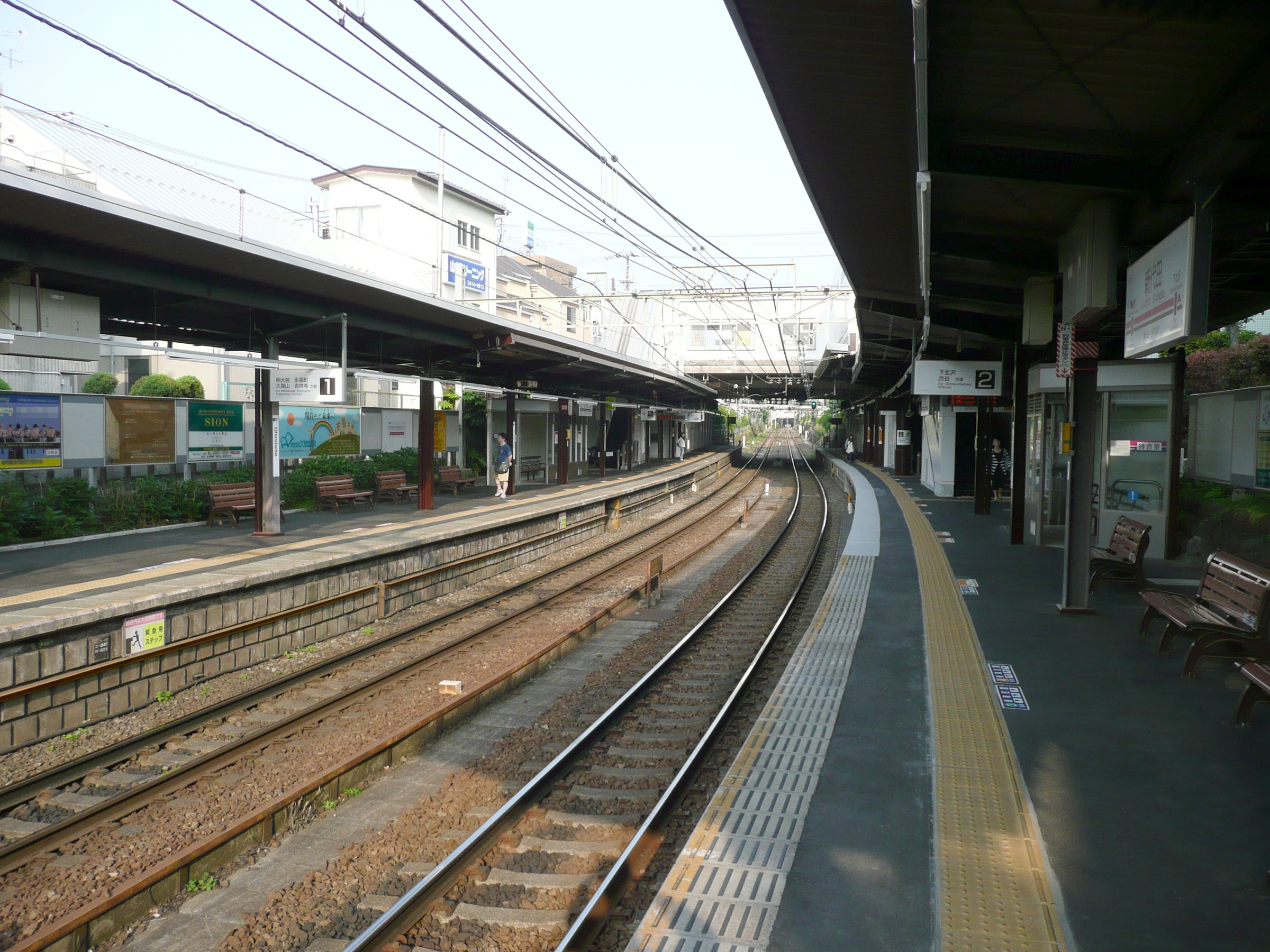
The platforms, May 2011

=== Platforms ===
1	Keio Inokashira Line	for Meidaimae, Eifukuchō, and Kichijōji
2	Keio Inokashira Line	for Shimo-Kitazawa and Shibuya

== History ==
The station first opened on August 1, 1933, as Daita-Nichōme Station (代田二丁目駅). It was renamed Shindaita on July 21, 1966.

From February 22, 2013, station numbering was introduced on Keio lines, with Shindaita Station becoming "IN06".

== Passenger statistics ==
In fiscal 2011, the station was used by an average of 8,288 passengers daily.

The passenger figures for previous years are as shown below.

Fiscal year	Daily average
1999	9,159
2010	8,317
2011	8,288

== Surrounding area ==
Shindaita Station is only some 500 m from Shimo-Kitazawa and Higashi-Matsubara stations on either side. From the middle of the Shibuya-bound platform, one can actually see both of the neighboring stations. Perhaps because Shimo-Kitazawa is only a few minutes away on foot and because just outside the station is Kannana Dori Avenue, there is no shopping street by the station.
