= Hakone-Yumoto Station =

Railway station in Hakone, Kanagawa Prefecture, Japan

Coordinates: 35°14′0.70″N 139°6′14.07″E

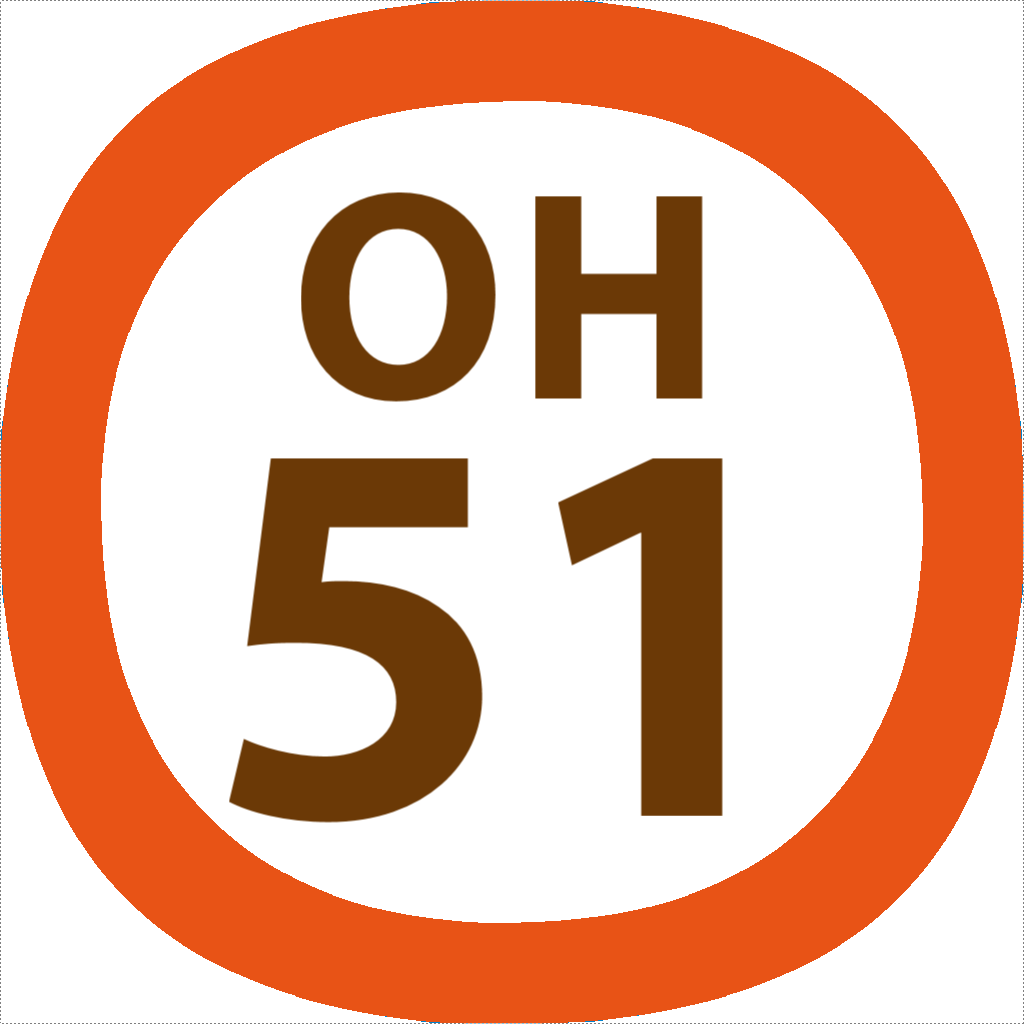
Hakone-Yumoto Station 箱根湯本駅

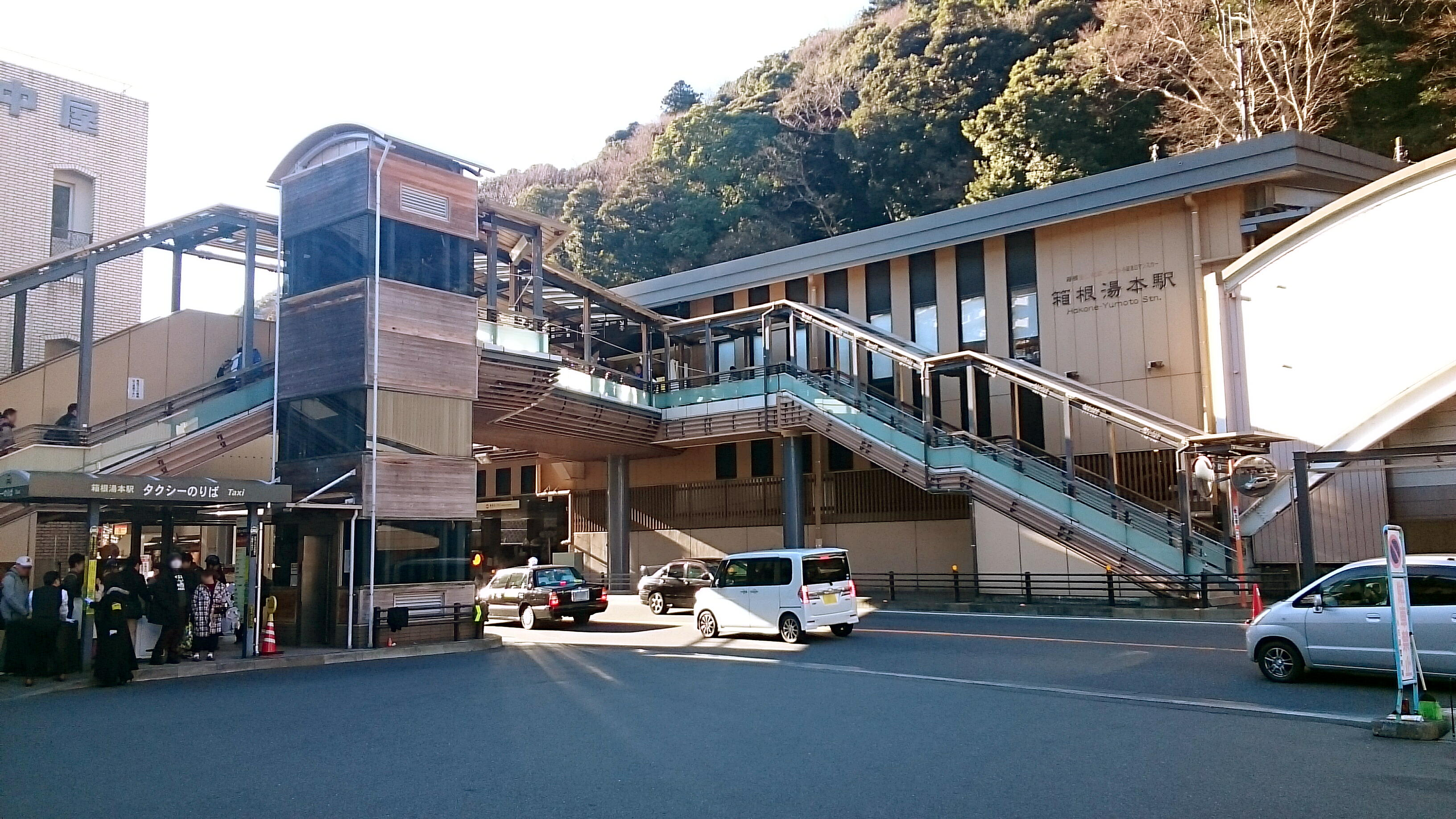
- The station in January 2018

General information
- Location: 707-1 Yumoto Shiraishishita, Hakone-machi, Ashigarashimo-gun, Kanagawa-ken; Japan
- Operator: Odakyu Electric Railway; Odakyu Hakone
- Line: Hakone Tozan Line
- Distance: 6.1 km from Odawara
- Tracks: 4
- Connections: Bus terminal

History
- Opened: 1 October 1919
- Rebuilt: 2009

Services
| Preceding station | Odakyu | Following station |
|---|---|---|
| Terminus | Romancecar | Odawara towards Shinjuku or Kita-Senju |
| Terminus | Hakone Tozan Line Local | Iriuda towards Odawara |
| Preceding station | Odakyu Hakone | Following station |
| Tōnosawa towards Gōra | Hakone Tozan Line | Terminus |
Location
- Location within Japan

Hakone-Yumoto Station (箱根湯本駅, Hakone-Yumoto-eki) is a railway station on the Hakone Tozan Line in Hakone, Kanagawa, Japan.

== Lines ==
Hakone-Yumoto Station is served by the Hakone Tozan Line from Odawara to Gōra, although all Hakone Tozan Line trains start from this station, and only Odakyu services operate between Hakone-Yumoto and Odawara. The station lies 6.1 kilometers from the line's official starting point at Odawara Station. Odakyu Electric Railway "Romancecar" limited express trains run between Shinjuku and this station.

== Station layout ==
The station has four tracks. There are some shops, information center for sightseeing and hotel reservations, and bus terminal also in front of the station.

=== Platforms ===
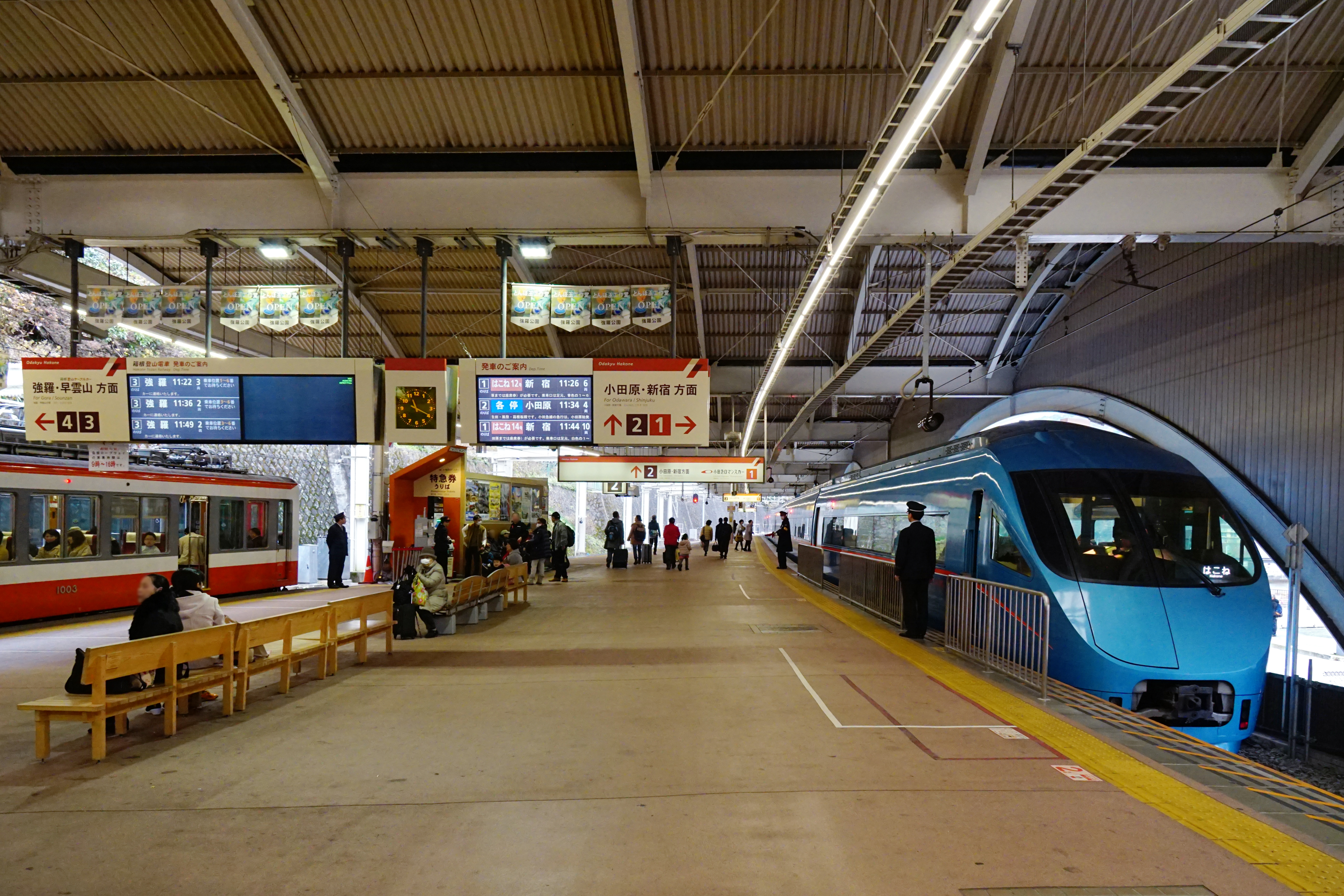
The platforms in December 2016

| 1 | Hakone Tozan Line | limited express trains for Odawara; Odakyu Odawara Line for Machida and Shinjuku; Tokyo Metro Chiyoda Line for Kita-Senju |
| 2 | Hakone Tozan Line | local trains for Odawara; Odakyu Odawara Line for Shin-Matsuda and Shinjuku |
| 3 | Hakone Tozan Line | for Gōra |
| 4 | Hakone Tozan Line | extra |

== History ==
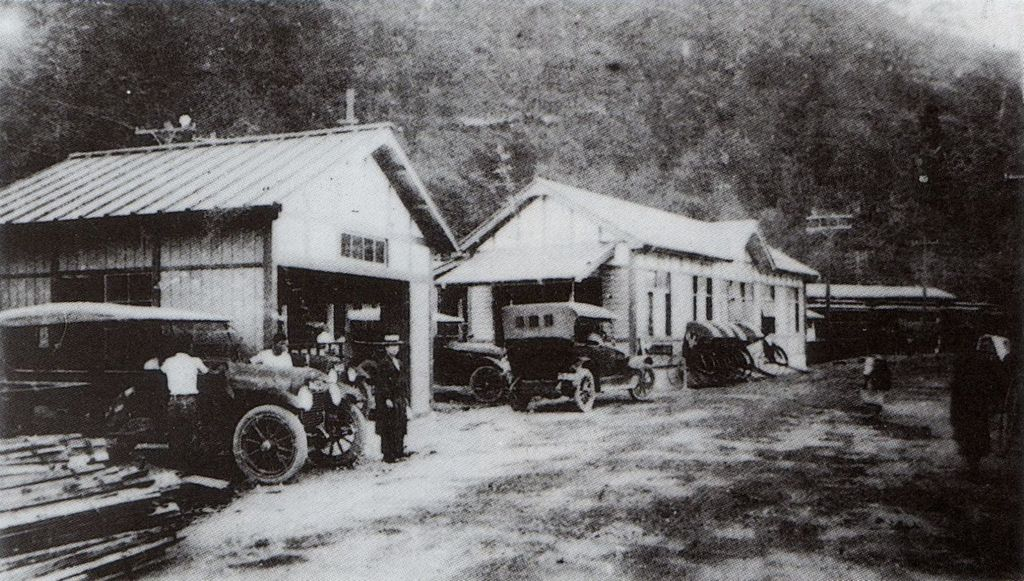
Hakone-Yumoto Station in 1919

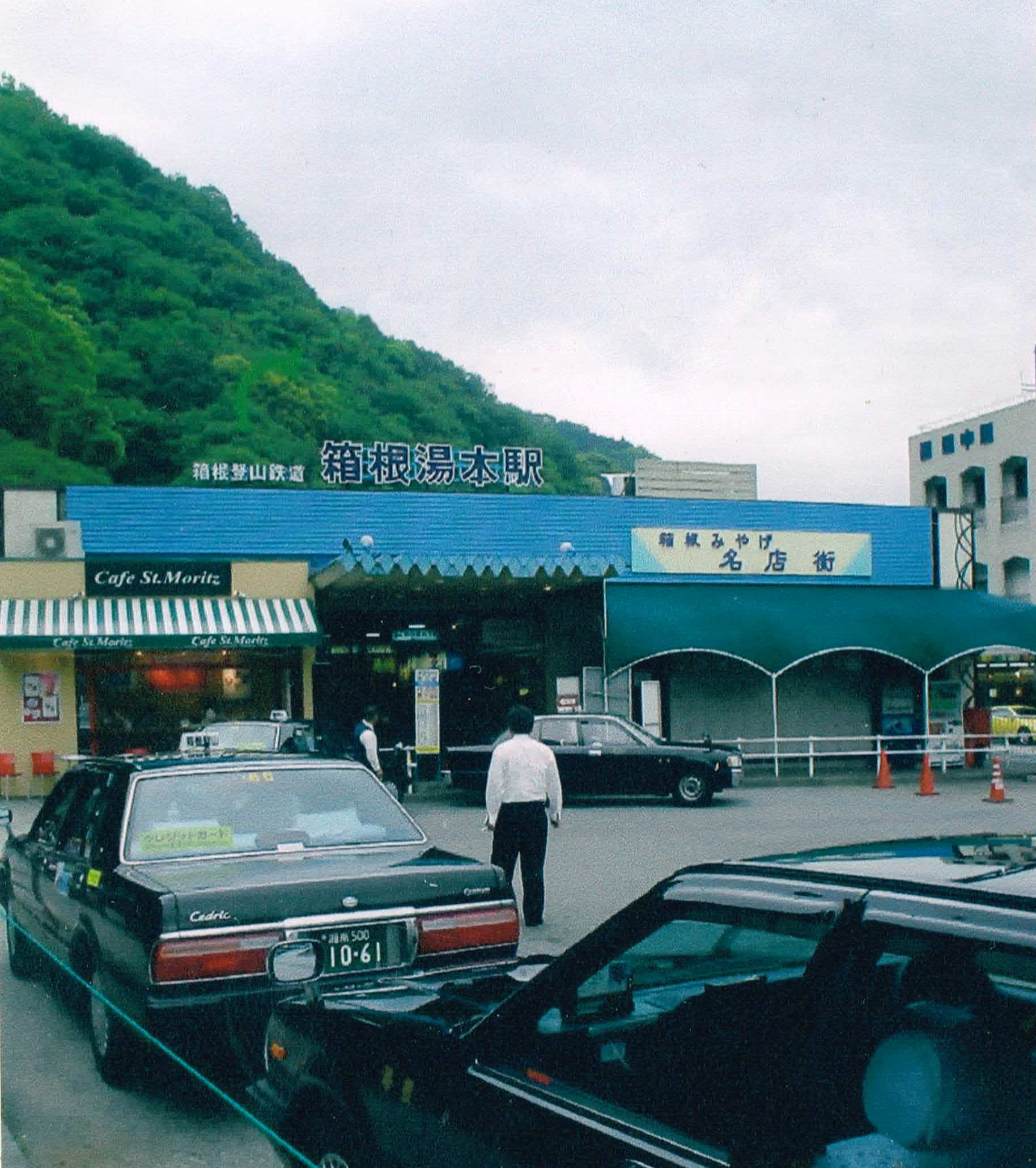
The station forecourt in 2004 before remodelling

Hakone-Yumoto station opened on 1 October 1888, as "Odawara Horse-drawn Railway" terminal Yumoto Station, from Kōzu Station (on the Tokaido Main Line), via Odawara Station. On June 1, 1919, a new electrified funicular railway was opened from Hakone-Yumoto to Gōra, and the Hakone Tozan Railway (founded 1928) converted the Odawawa to Hakone-Yumoto tram line to a railway in 1935.

Since 1950, Odakyu Electric Railway provides through services from Shinjuku Station on its Odawara Line, by Limited Express "Romancecar" and Express (commuter trains). After 15 March 2008, Odakyu discontinued normal Express services on the Hakone Tozan Line. A new station building was completed in 2009.

Station numbering was introduced in January 2014 with Hakone-Yumoto being assigned station number OH51.

On 1 April 2024, operations of the station under the Hakone Tozan Railway was transferred to the aegis of Odakyu Hakone resulting from restructuring of Odakyu Group operations in the Hakone area.

== Bus services ==
Buses are operated by several companies.

- Bus stop No.1 (Izuhakone Bus)
  - "Z" line for Hakone Checkpoint (Lake Ashi) via Miyanoshita, Kowakidani Station, Kowaki-en, Moto Hakone (Hakone Shrine)
  - "J" line for Hakone-en (Lake Ashi) via Miyanoshita, Kowakidani Station, Kowaki-en, Ōwakudani, Kojiri
- Bus stop No.2 (Hakone Tozan Bus)
  - "H" line for Hakone Machi Ko (Lake Ashi) via Miyanoshita, Kowakidani Station, Kowaki-en, Moto Hakone Ko (Hakone Shrine: Transfer for Sightseeing Cruise), Hakone Checkpoint
- Bus stop No.3 (Hakone Tozan Bus)
  - "T" line for Togendai (Lake Ashi: Transfer for Sightseeing Cruise) via Miyanoshita, Venetian Glass Museum, Sengoku (Transfer for Gotemba Premium Outlets and JR Gotemba Station; a gateway station for Mount Fuji and Fuji Five Lakes, including Lake Kawaguchi and Lake Yamanaka), Kawamukai (The Little Prince and Saint-Exupéry Museum), Senkyoro-mae (Transfer for Pola Museum of Art), Sengoku-kogen (Pampas grass viewing spot)
- Bus stop No.4
  - "K" line for Moto Hakone Ko (Hakone Shrine: Transfer for Sightseeing Cruise) via Hatajuku (Hakone Tozan Bus)
  - "D" line for Haneda Airport via Yokohama Station (Odakyu Hakone Highway Bus & Keikyu Bus)
- Bus stop No.5 (All buses)
  - for Odawara Station
- Bus stop No.6 (Hakone tozan Bus)
  - for Gora Station via Miyanoshita, Kowakidani Station and Chōkoku-no-Mori Station

== See also ==
- List of railway stations in Japan
