= Minamikarasuyama =

Minamikarasuyama 南烏山
- District
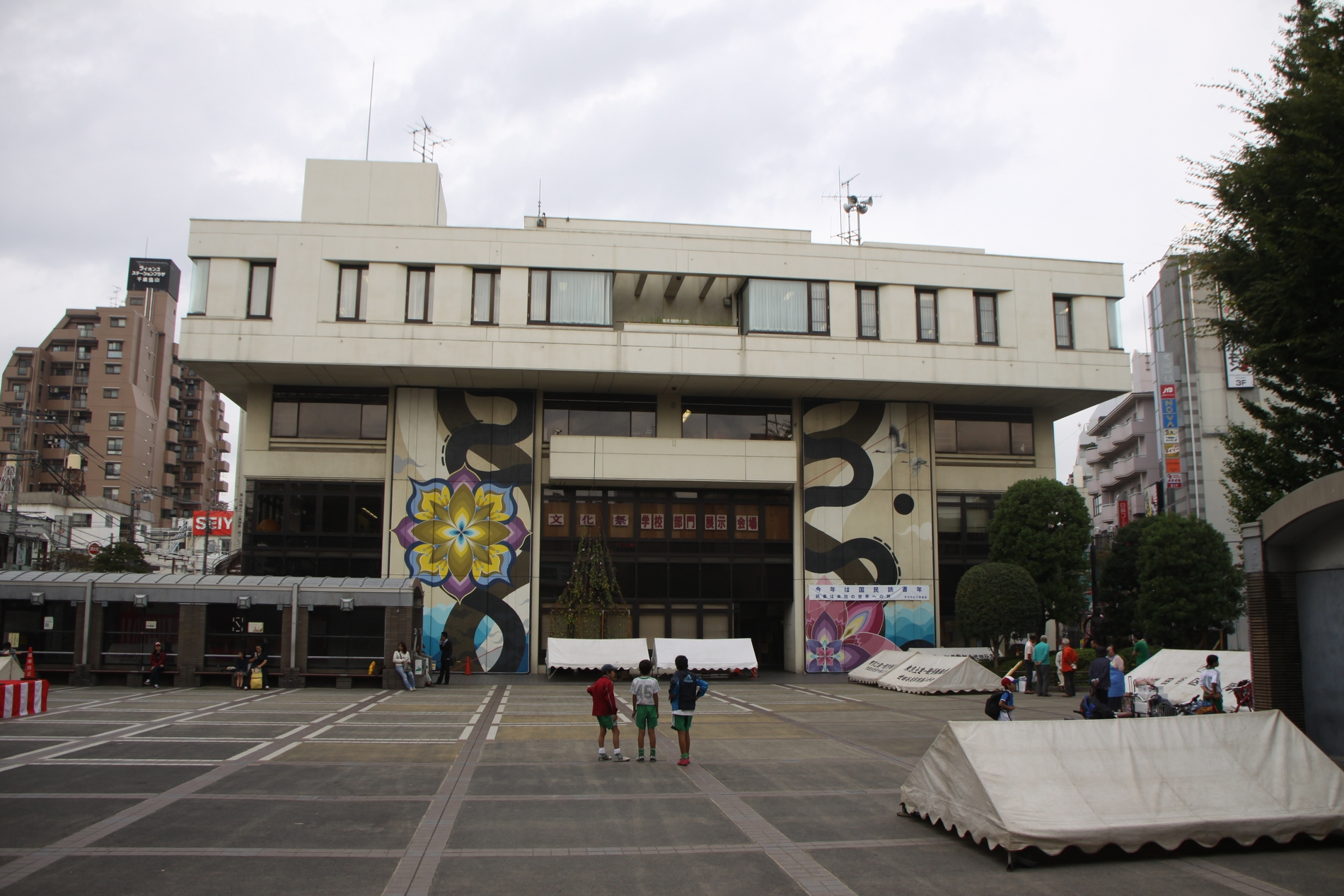

- Location within Special wards of Tokyo
- Coordinates: 35°40′5.77″N 139°36′4.4″E
- Country: Japan
- City: Tokyo
- Ward: Setagaya

Population (September 1, 2019)
  - Total: 23,445
- Time zone: UTC+9 (JST)
- Postal code: 156-0062
- Area code: 03

Minamikarasuyama (南烏山) is a district of Setagaya, Tokyo, Japan.

== Geography ==
Minamikarasuyama borders Kasuya and Kamisoshigaya to the south, Kyūden to the west, Kitano in Mitaka, Kitakarasuyama to the north, Muri in Suginami, Kugayama and Hachimanyama to the east.

The southern part originated from a village along the Kōshū Kaidō, and the northern part was mainly triggered by the following "Karasuyama Temple Town". For this reason, the northern part has different characteristics from the area around Chitose-Karasuyama Station, such as some facilities called "Kugayama" and "Mitaka".

== Education ==
Setagaya Board of Education operates public elementary and junior high schools. All of 1-chome and 2-chome, and a part of 5-chome are zoned to Roka Elementary School (芦花小学校) and Roka Junior High School (芦花中学校). 3-chome is zoned to Musashi Gaoka Elementary School (武蔵丘小学校). 4-chome and parts of 6-chome are zoned to Karasuyama North (Kita) Elementary School (烏山北小学校). Parts of 5-chome are zoned to Karasuyama Elementary School (烏山小学校). Part of 6-chome is zoned to Kyuden Elementary School (給田小学校). All of 3 and 4-chome and part of 6-chome are zoned to Karasuyama Junior High School (烏山中学校). Parts of 5 and 6-chome are zoned to Kamisoshigaya Junior High School (上祖師谷中学校).
