= Hachimanyama =

Hachimanyama may refer to:

- Hachimanyama, Setagaya, a district in Setagaya ward in Tokyo
- Hachimanyama Castle, castle structure in Ōmihachiman, Shiga
- Hachimanyama Ropeway, aerial lift line in Ōmihachiman, Shiga
- Hachimanyama Station, railway station in Suginami, Tokyo
