= Kamikitazawa =

Kamikitazawa 上北沢
- District
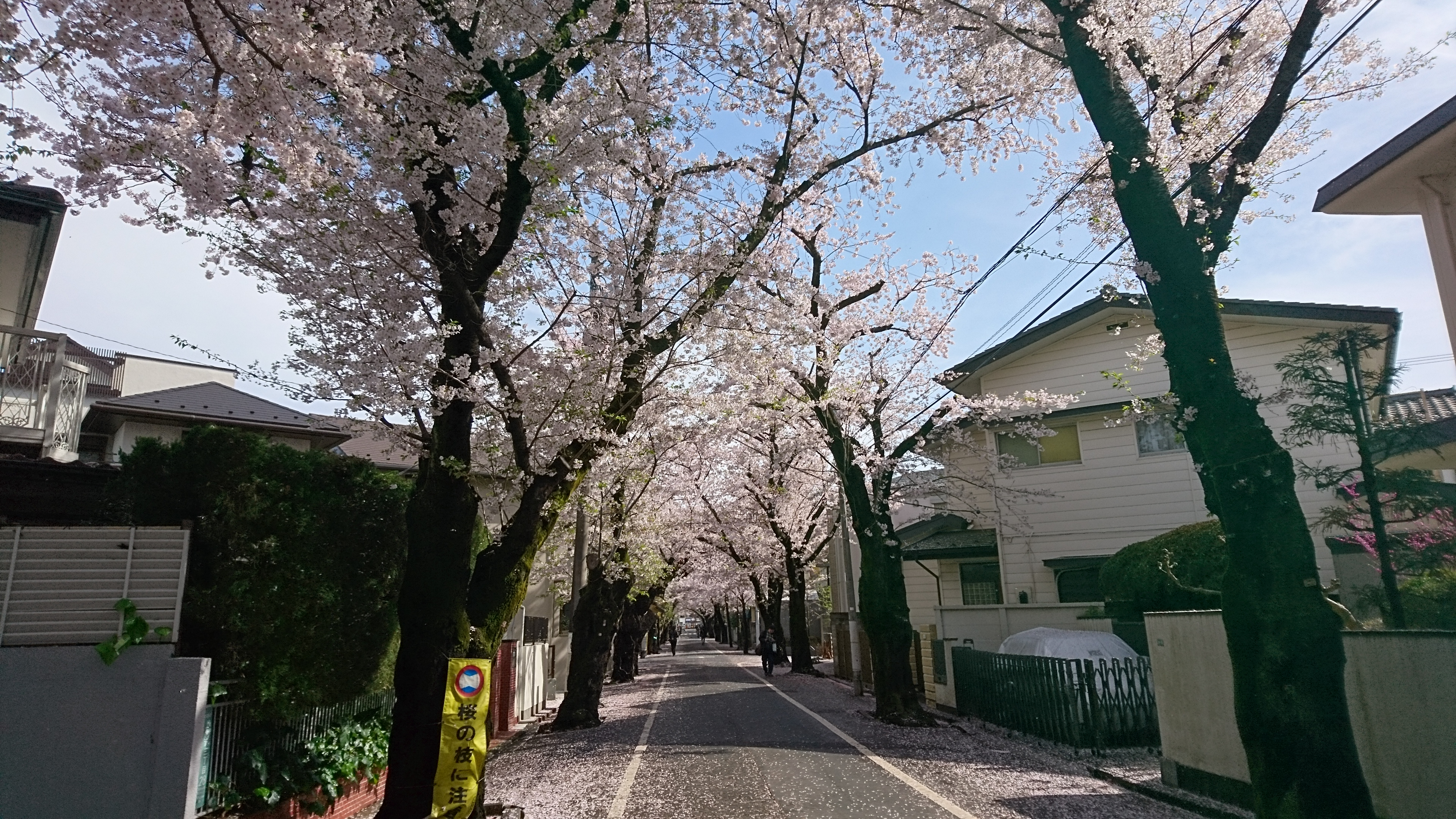

- Location within Special wards of Tokyo
- Coordinates: 35°40′7.06″N 139°37′26.48″E
- Country: Japan
- City: Tokyo
- Ward: Setagaya

Population (September 1, 2019)
  - Total: 16,925
- Time zone: UTC+9 (JST)
- Postal code: 156-0057
- Area code: 03

Kamikitazawa (上北沢) is a district of Setagaya, Tokyo, Japan.

== Education ==
Setagaya Board of Education operates public elementary and junior high schools.

1-chome is zoned to Hachimanyama Elementary School (八幡山小学校). 2-4-chome and parts of 5-chome are zoned to Kamikitazawa Elementary School (上北沢小学校). Hachimanyama and Kamikitazawa areas feed into Midorigaoka Junior High School (世田谷区立緑丘中学校). Other parts of 5-chome are zoned to Musashigaoka Elementary School (世田谷区立武蔵丘小学校) and Karasuyama Junior High School (世田谷区立烏山中学校).
