= Kuhonbutsu Jōshin-ji =

Buddhist temple in Setagaya, Tokyo

Coordinates: 35.6082°N 139.6608°E

Kuhombutsu Jōshin-ji
- 九品仏浄真寺
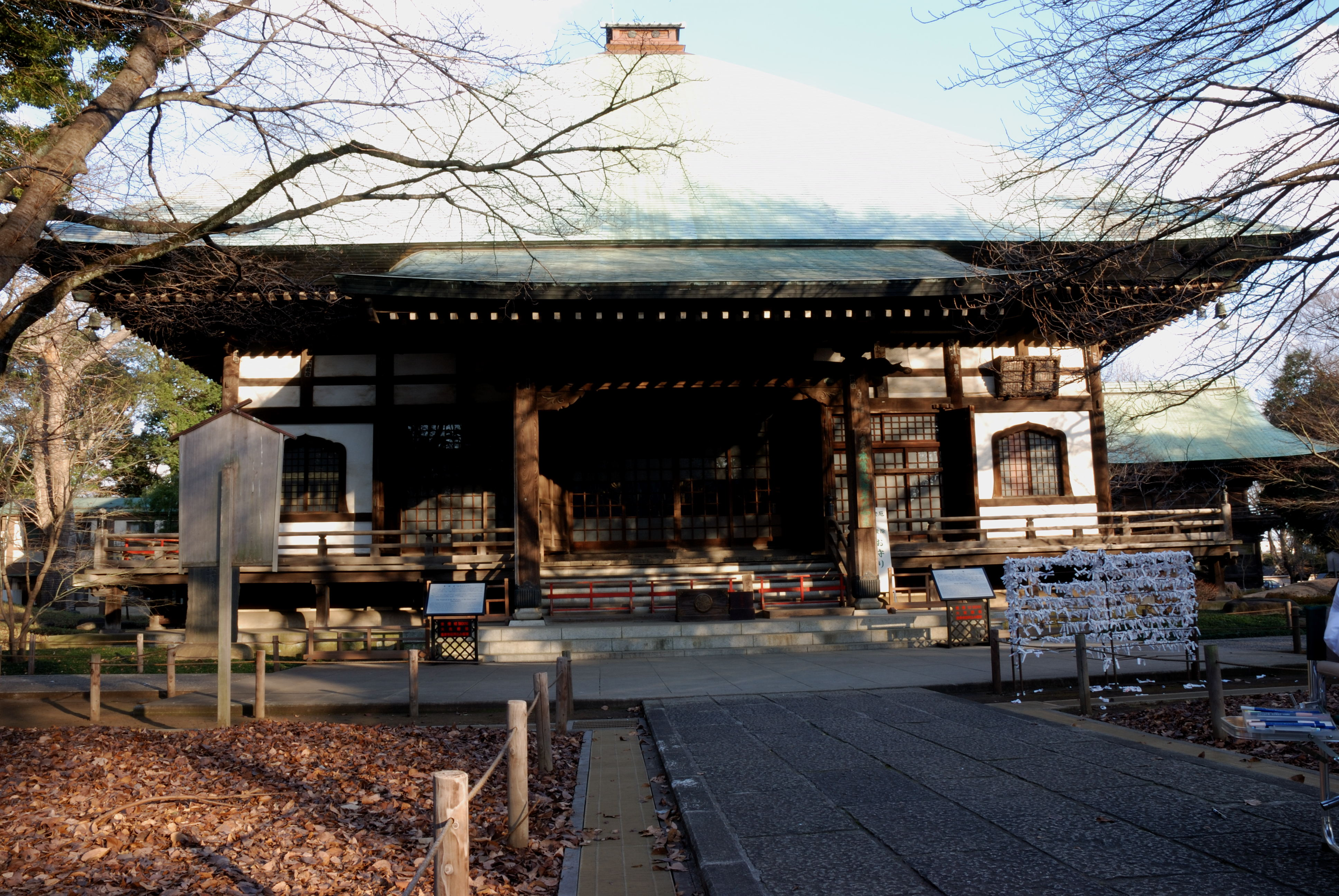

Religion
- Affiliation: Buddhism
- Sect: Jodo-shu

Location
- Location: 7 Chome-41-3 Okusawa, Setagaya, Tokyo 158-0083
- Country: Japan
- Interactive map of Kuhombutsu Jōshin-ji

Website
- https://kuhombutsu.jp/

Kuhombutsu (九品仏), officially designated as Joshin-ji (浄真寺, Joshin-ji), is a Buddhist temple situated in Setagaya, Tokyo. Affiliated with the Jōdo sect, it is dedicated to the Buddha. The temple derives its name from the presence of nine statues, each depicting a different manifestation of Amida Buddha, within its premises.

== History ==
The temple was constructed on the former site of Okusawa Castle, which was previously owned by the Kira clan. Following the destruction of the castle during the Sengoku period, shogun Tokugawa Ietsuna bestowed the plot upon the Jodo sect. In 1678, a priest called Kaseki built the temple.

== Architecture ==
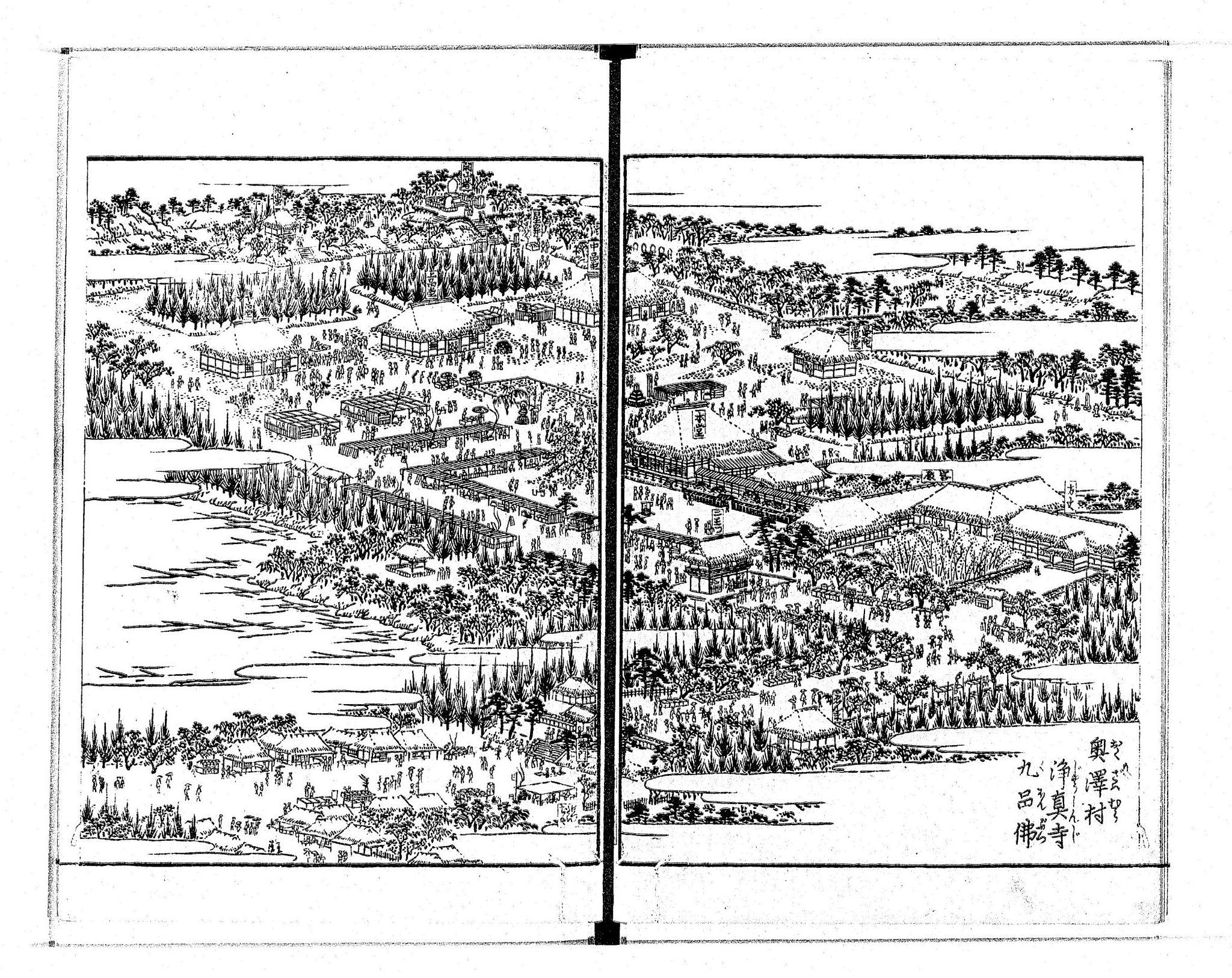

The temple grounds also house a number of old trees, including a ginkgo declared Cultural Heritage . Additionally, the temple layout is aligned with the principles of the Pure Land tradition. Derived from the 36 votes of Amida Buddha, the grounds occupy 3,600 tsubo (12,000 m²), the columns of the Three Buddha Halls are 36 in total, and the distance between the Jōbon-dō and the Main Hall is 36 ken (76.2 m).

=== Halls ===
==== Main Hall ====
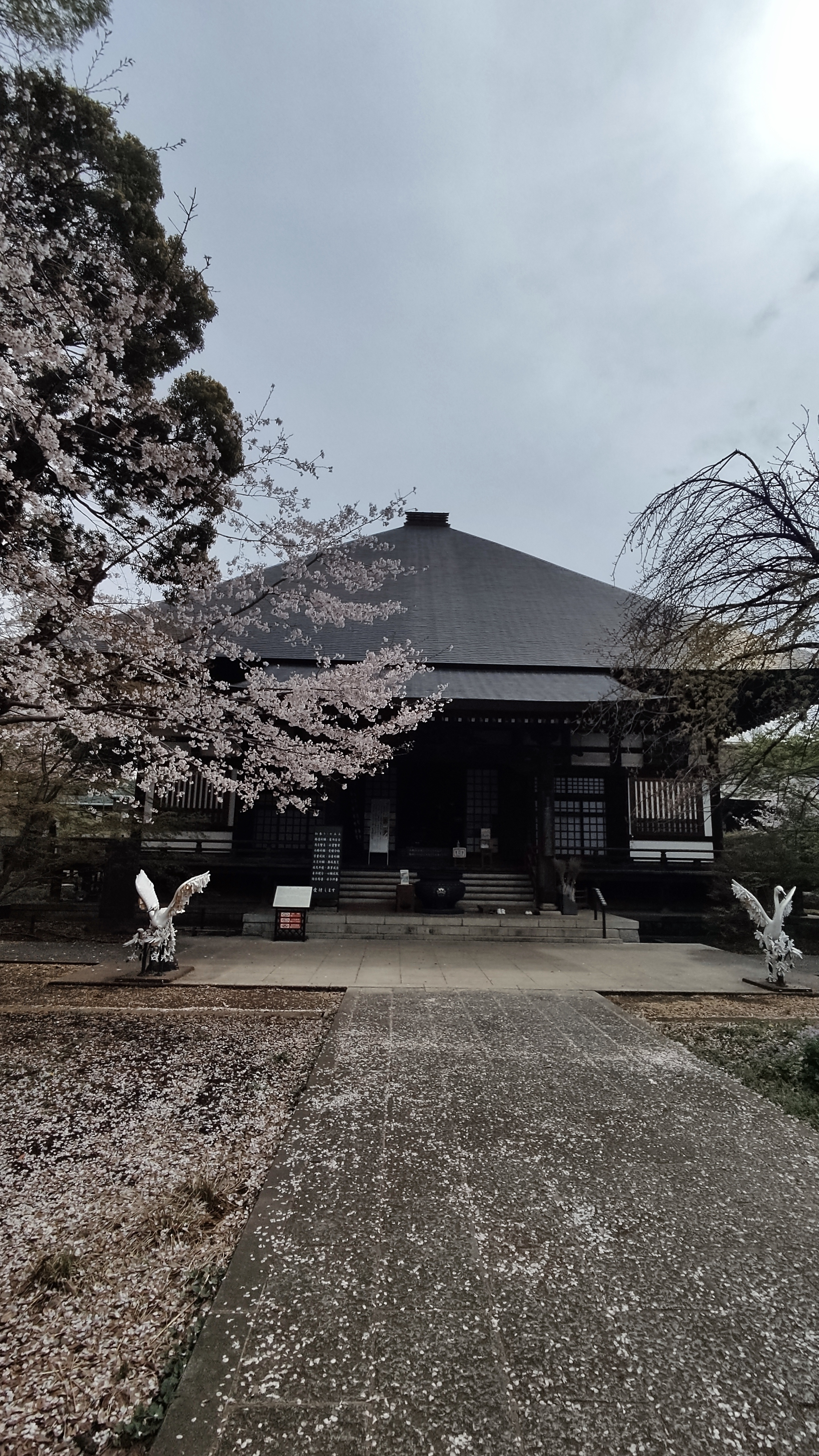
Main Hall (March 2023

The Main Hall o Ryūgo-den (龍護殿) is a 20-metre-tall and 20-metre-wide construction. The hip roof is covered with copper plates. Affixed to the lintel is a plate inscribed with the official name of the hall, "Ryūgo-den." Inside, there are a number of ornamental figures, the most notable of which is a 2.81-metre-tall statue of Gautama Buddha. The original statue, created by Kaseki, was destroyed in a fire in 1748, after which a replacement was installed in 1760.

==== Three Buddha Halls ====
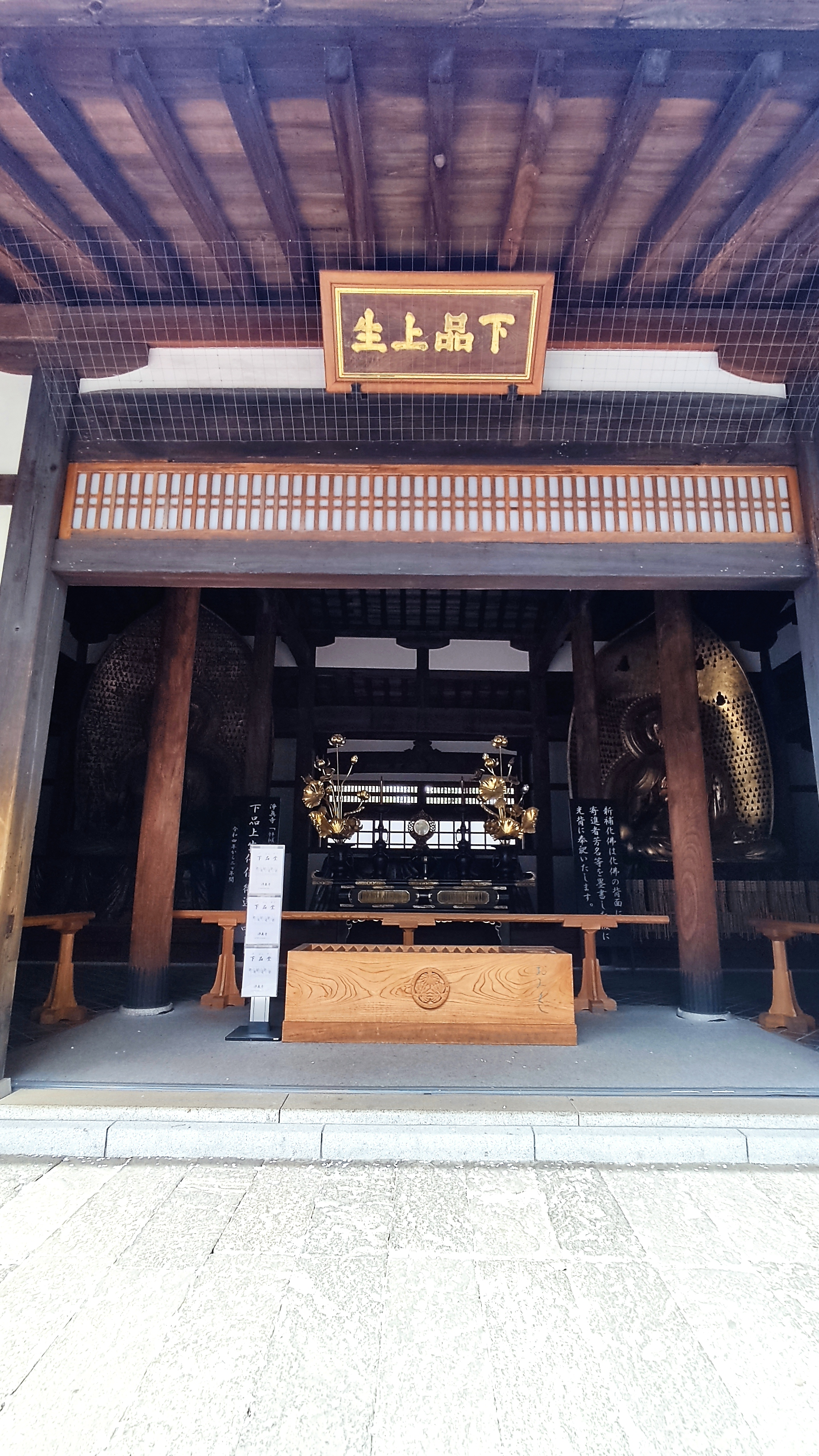
Gebon (March 2023)

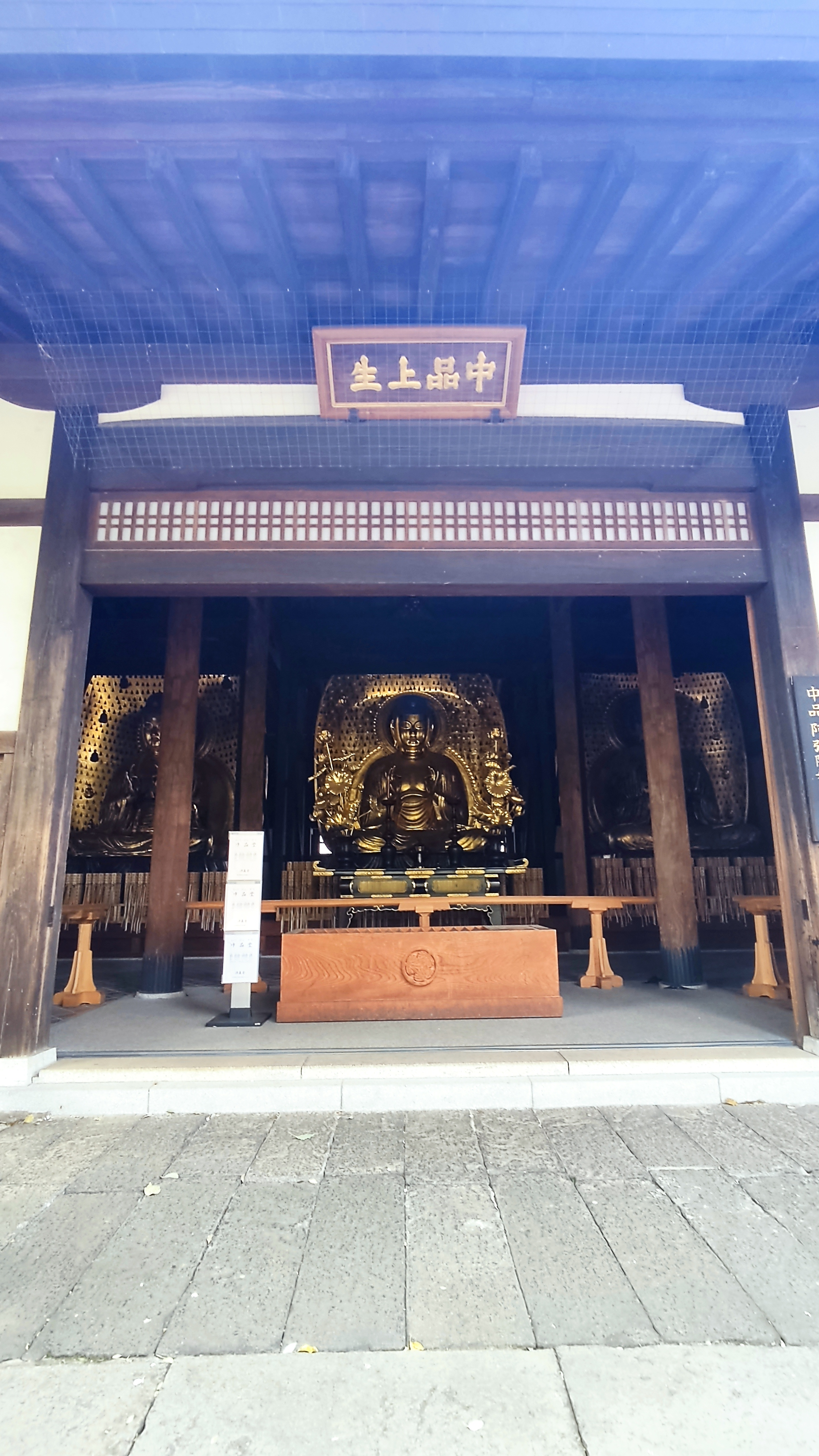
Chūbon (March 2023)

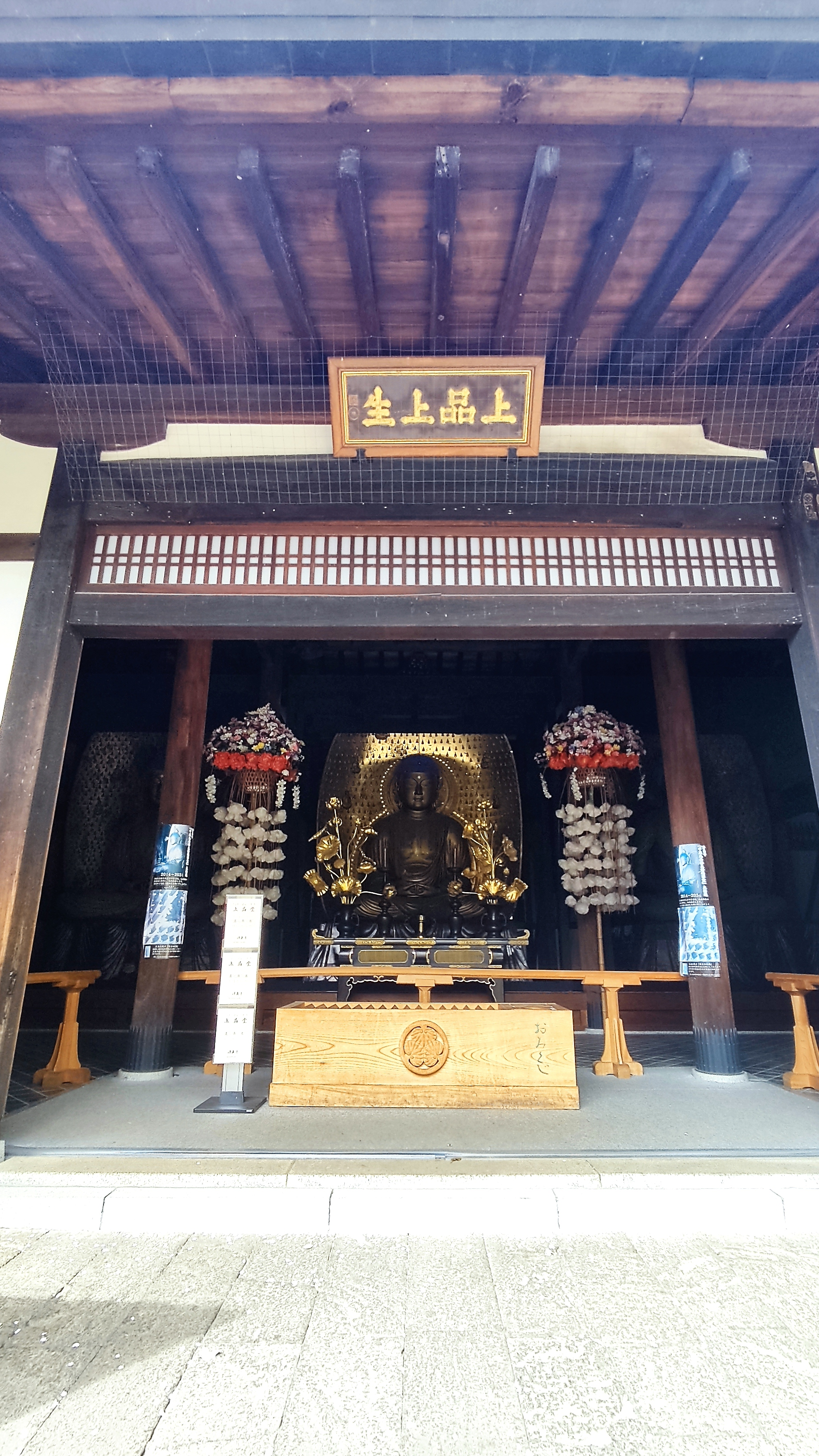
Jōbon (March 2023)

There are three halls facing the Main Hall: the Gebon-dō (下品堂) on the left, Jōbon-dō (上品堂) in the centre, and the Chūbon-dō (中品堂) on the right. Each building houses three golden statues of Amida Buddha, also sculpted by Kaseki with the help of his disciple Kaoku. These statues symbolise the nine levels into which the individuals who are reborn in the Pure Land are classified according to their purity at the time of their death. The Gebon-dō contains the statues representing the lower level. The Chūbon-dō houses the statues of the intermediate level. Ultimately, the Jōbon-dō contains the statues of the upper level. Each statue is depicted in a different posture. The more mundane poses are reserved for the statues of the lower levels, and the more sacred ones for the statues of the upper levels.

==== Founder's Hall ====
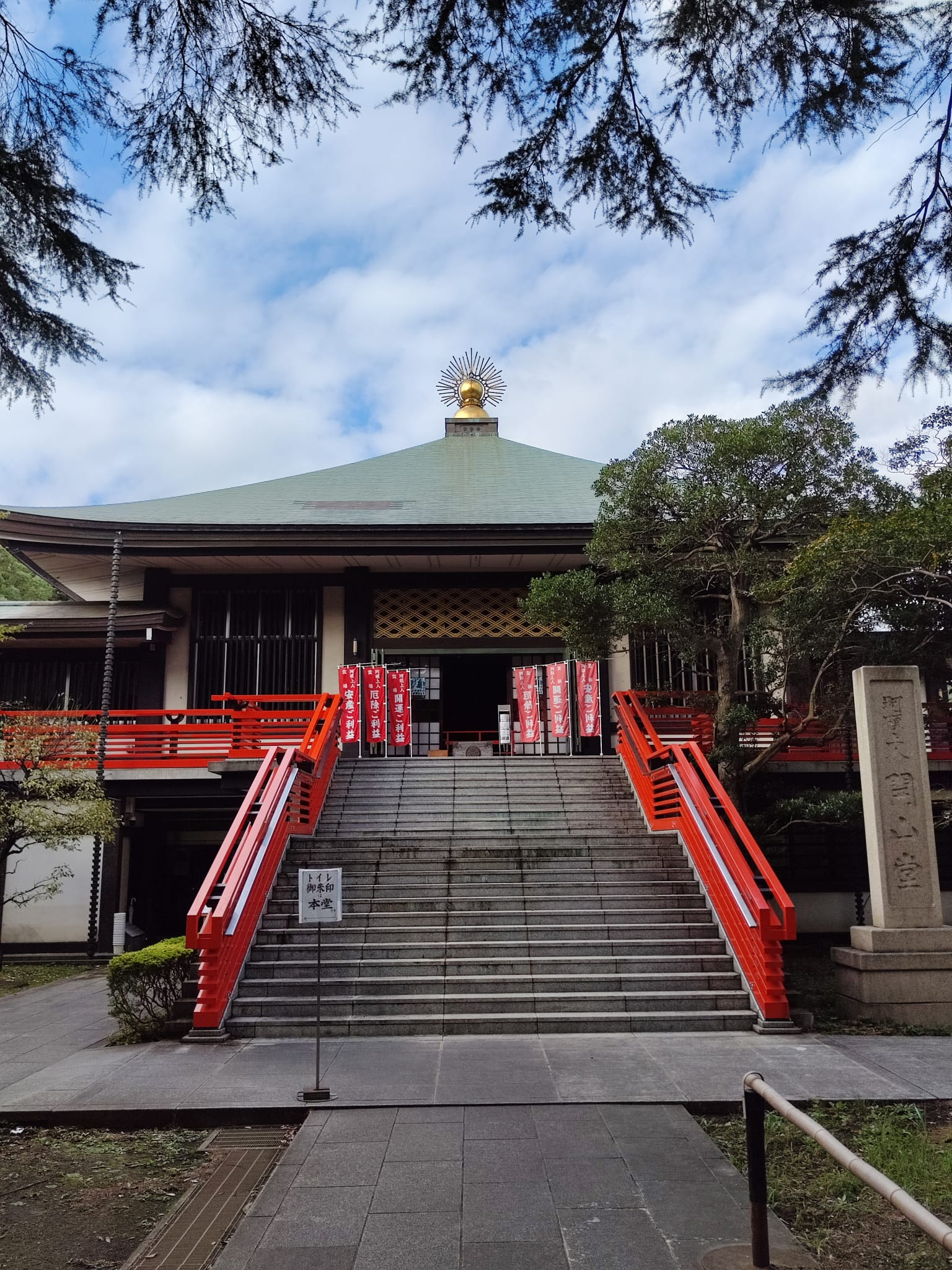
Founder's Hall

The statue of Kaseki is situated within this hall. The tradition says that this statue provides protection against misfortune and ensures safe childbirth for pregnant women.

==== Kannon Hall ====
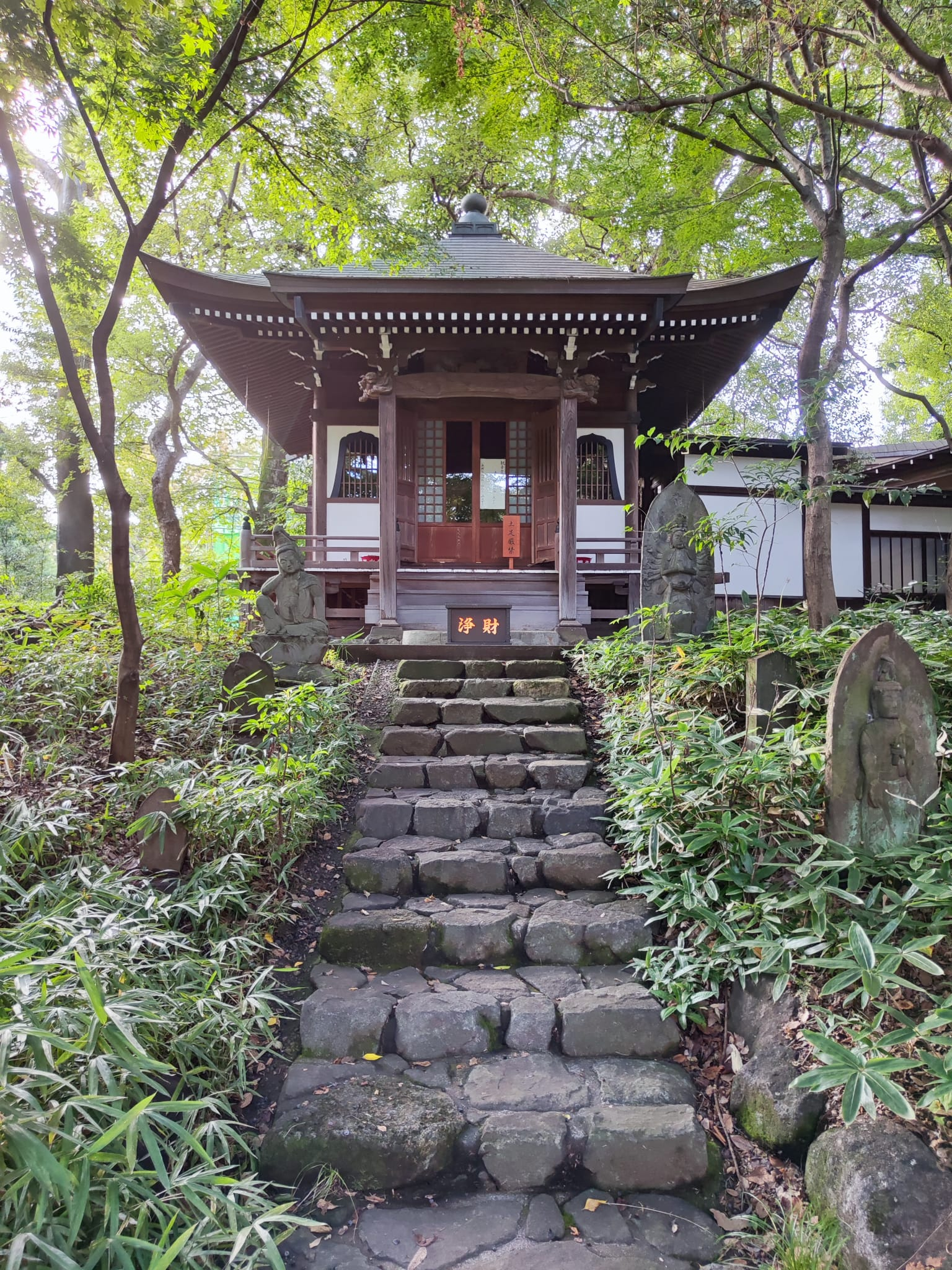
Kannon Hall

This hall is dedicated to the worship of Kannon. A total of 33 statues, representing the 33 manifestations of Kannon, are situated around the building.

=== Gates ===
==== Sōmon ====
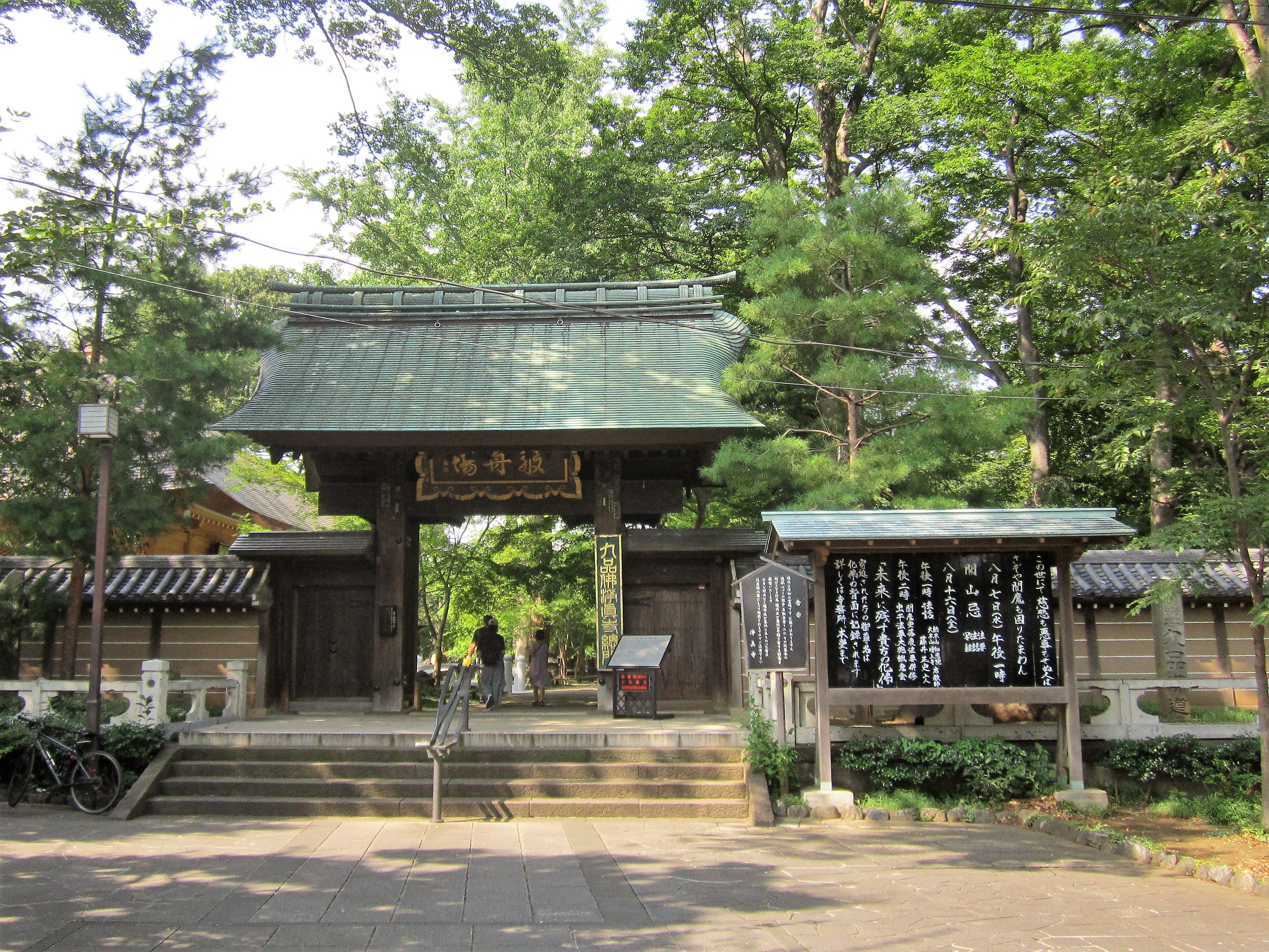
Puerta exterior del templo

The Sōmon is a simple wooden structure. On the right pillar, it bears the official name of the temple, while on the lintel, there is a plaque reading "Hanjujo" (般舟場). This plaque makes reference to the Pratyutpanna-samadhi sutra (Japanese: 般舟三昧経), which contains the earliest known references to Amida Buddha and his Pure Land.

==== Main Gate ====
The Main Gate or 仁王門 (niō-mon) is the entrance to the main worship area of the temple. It is a wooden structure built in 1793 and stands on a stone platform. It is six metres in height and has an irimoya roof with copper plates installed in 1964 that replaces a former thatched roof. Furthermore, the gate's body is divided into two floors. The upper floor contains one statue of Amida and 25 statues of Bodhisattvas. The lower section, at the front, contains two statues of Niō, the protective deities of Buddhism.

==== Bell Tower ====
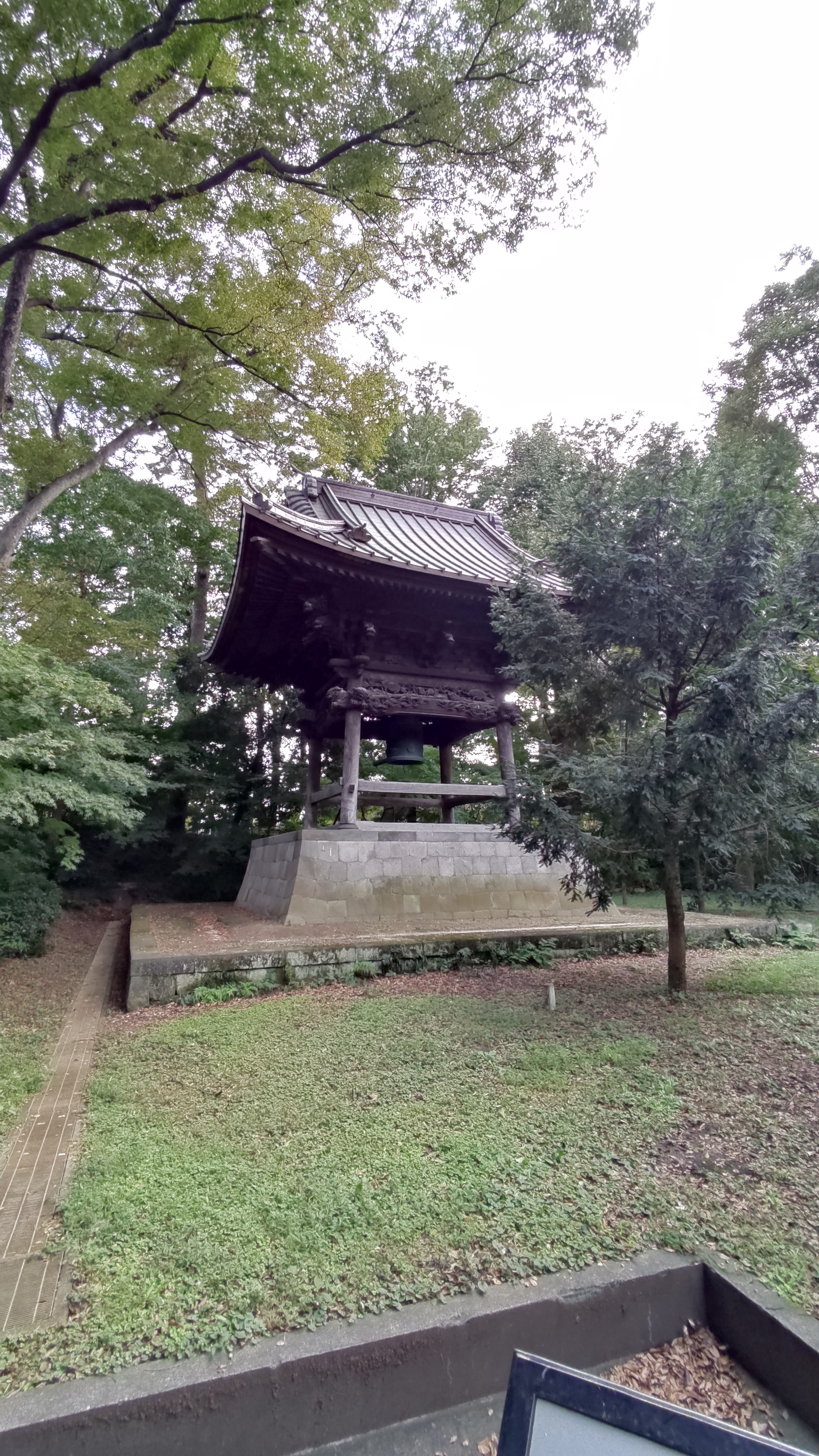
Bell Tower

This bell tower can be found on the left of the Main Gate. The structure was erected in 1708. The wooden structure is adorned with intricate carvings and elaborate sculptures. Additionally, the bell is adorned with arabesque-like motifs, as well as depictions of Buddha and celestial beings.
