= Setagaya-Daita Station =

Railway station in Tokyo, Japan

Coordinates: 35.6584°N 139.6613°E

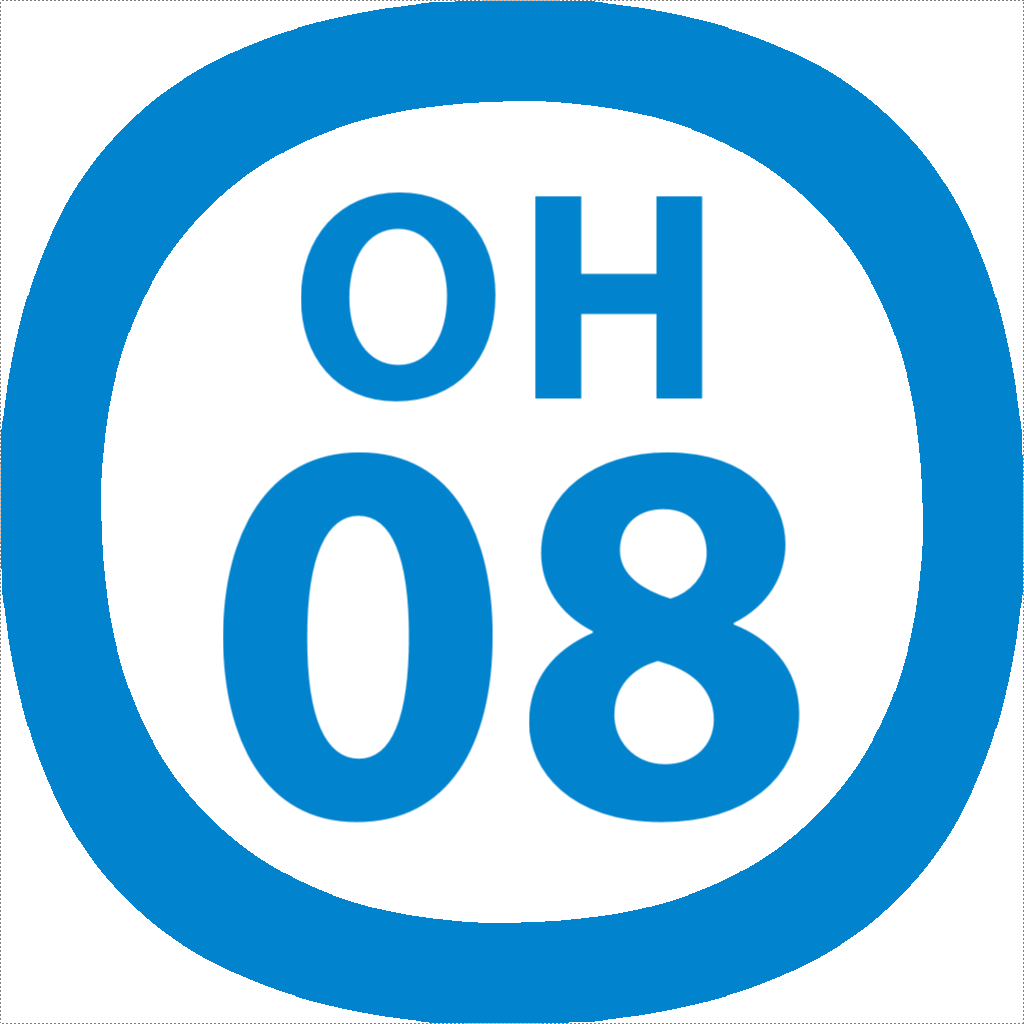
Setagaya-Daita Station 世田谷代田駅

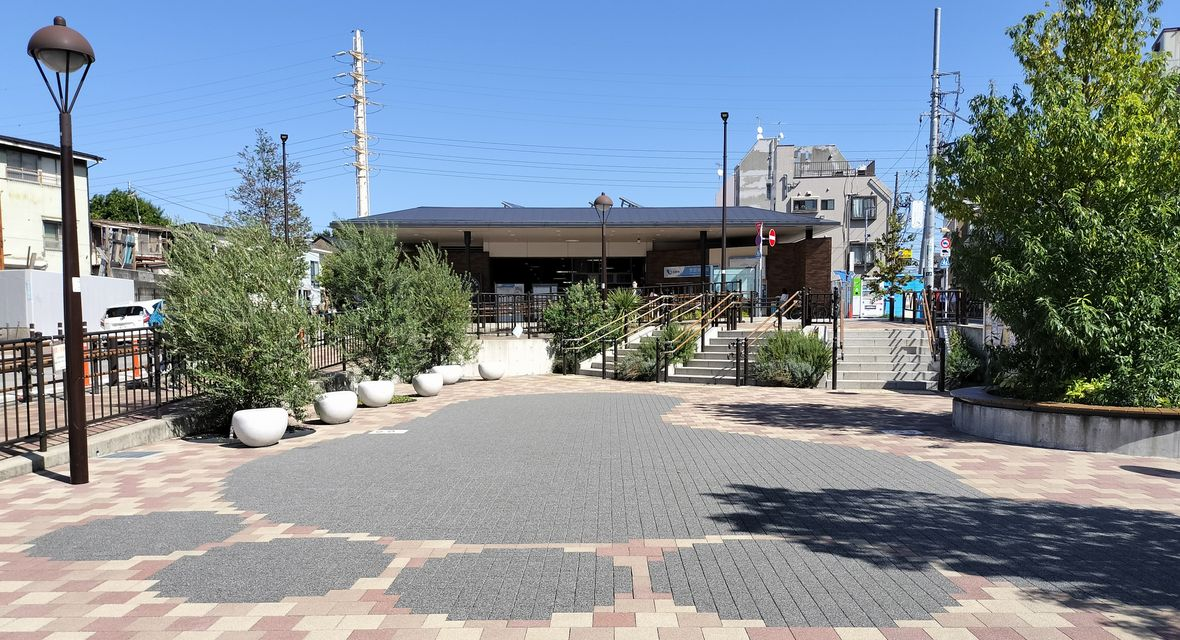
- Setagaya-Daita Station

General information
- Location: Setagaya, Tokyo; Japan
- Operator: Odakyu Electric Railway
- Line: Odakyu Odawara Line

Construction
- Structure type: Underground

Other information
- Station code: OH08

History
- Opened: 1 April 1927; 99 years ago
- Former names: Setagaya-Nakahara (until 20 August 1946)

Passengers
- FY2023: 9,543 daily ▲5.6%
- Rank: 61 out of 70

Services
Preceding station	Odakyu	Following station
Umegaoka towards Odawara	Odawara Line Local	Shimo-Kitazawa towards Shinjuku or Yoyogi-Uehara
Location

Setagaya-Daita Station (世田谷代田駅, Setagaya-Daita eki) is an underground passenger train station on the Odawara Line in Setagaya, Tokyo, Japan, operated by the private railway operator Odakyu Electric Railway.

== Station layout ==
Setagaya-Daita Station generally has two side platforms serving two tracks. However, in the middle portion of the station it becomes one large island platform serving two tracks. The presence of walls generally separates what is a large island platform into two side platforms for most of the station. Two additional tracks run underneath the station, allowing express trains to bypass the station without stopping.

=== Platforms ===
1	Odakyū Odawara Line	for Machida, Hon-Atsugi and Odawara; Hakone-Tozan Railway for Hakone-Yumoto; Odakyu Enoshima Line for Fujisawa and Katase-Enoshima
2	Odakyū Odawara Line	for Shinjuku; Tokyo Metro Chiyoda Line for Ayase; Joban Line for Abiko and Toride

== History ==
Station opened on 1 April 1927, as Setagaya-Nakahara (世田ヶ谷中原). The station was struck by an air raid during World War II and was closed from 1 July 1945, to 15 June 1946. On 20 August 1946, the station was renamed Setagaya-Daita.

The station was formerly outdoors, featuring two side platforms and two tracks. After the completion of the Odawara Line Quadruple Track Project in 2018, the station was relocated underground. The station's layout was also altered, featuring one large island platform and two tracks at the middle portion of the station and two side platforms and two tracks at the rest of the station.

Station numbering was introduced in 2014 with Setagaya-Daita being assigned station number OH08.

In the 2015 data available from Japan’s Ministry of Land, Infrastructure, Transport and Tourism, Setagaya-Daita → Shimo-Kitazawa was one of the train segments among Tokyo's most crowded train lines during rush hour.
