= Umegaoka Station =

Railway station in Tokyo, Japan

Coordinates: 35.6560°N 139.6534°E

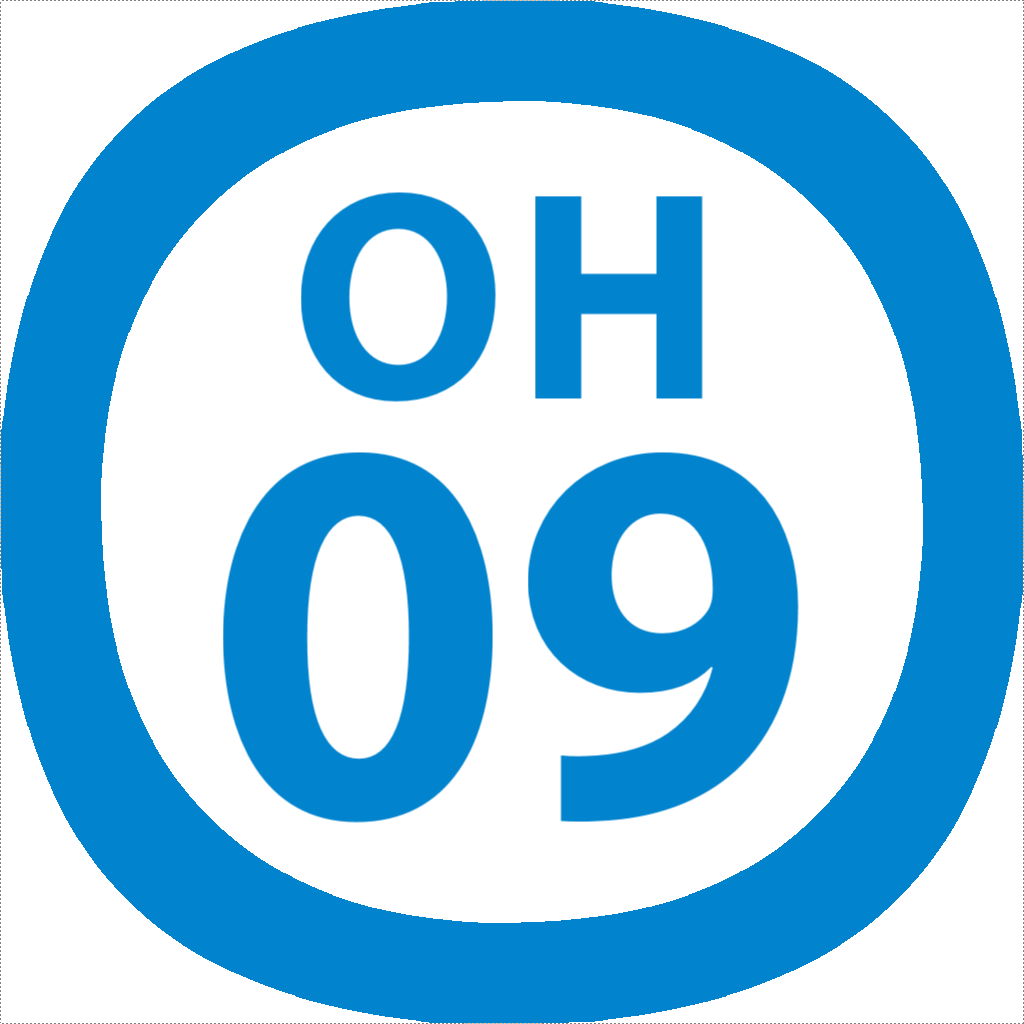
Umegaoka Station 梅ヶ丘駅

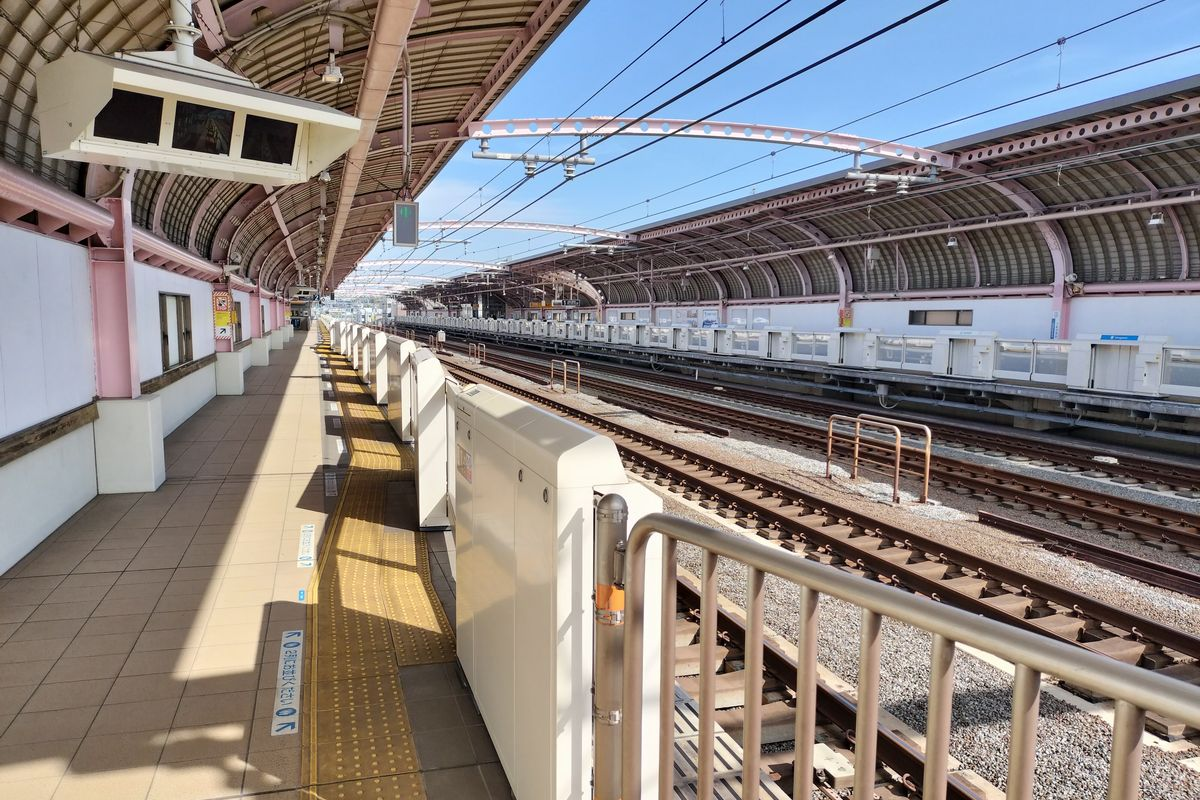

General information
- Location: Setagaya, Tokyo; Japan
- Operator: Odakyu Electric Railway
- Line: Odakyu Odawara Line

Other information
- Station code: OH09

History
- Opened: 1 April 1934; 92 years ago

Passengers
- FY2023: 31,170 daily ▲3.6%
- Rank: 33 out of 70

Services
Preceding station	Odakyu	Following station
Gōtokuji towards Odawara	Odawara Line Local	Setagaya-Daita towards Shinjuku or Yoyogi-Uehara
Location

Umegaoka Station (梅ヶ丘駅, Umegaoka eki) is a station on the Odakyu Odawara line, located in Setagaya, Tokyo and is operated by Odakyu Railway.

== Station layout ==
The station features four tracks and two side platforms. Express trains typically bypass the station on the two innermost tracks while local trains typically stop at the station on the two outermost tracks.

Before tracks were quadrupled on this section of the Odawara Line in 2004, the station featured two tracks and two side platforms.

=== Platforms ===
1	Odakyū Odawara Line	for Machida, Hon-Atsugi and Odawara; Hakone-Tozan Railway for Hakone-Yumoto; Odakyu Enoshima Line for Fujisawa and Katase-Enoshima
2	Odakyū Odawara Line	for Shinjuku; Tokyo Metro Chiyoda Line for Ayase; Joban Line for Abiko and Toride

== History ==
Station numbering was introduced in 2014 with Umegaoka being assigned station number OH09.

== Surroundings ==
- Hanegi Park
- Kokushikan University
