= Kitakarasuyama =

Kitakarasuyama 北烏山
- District
- Location within Special wards of Tokyo
- Coordinates: 35°40′27.11″N 139°36′17.8″E
- Country: Japan
- City: Tokyo
- Ward: Setagaya

Population (September 1, 2019)
  - Total: 27,166
- Time zone: UTC+9 (JST)
- Postal code: 157-0061
- Area code: 03

Kitakarasuyama (北烏山) is a district of Setagaya, Tokyo, Japan.

== Education ==
Setagaya Board of Education operates public elementary and junior high schools.

1 and 2-chome are zoned to Musashigaoka Elementary School (武蔵丘小学校). 3-4 and 6-chome and parts of 5-chome are zoned to Karasuyama Kita Elementary School (烏山北小学校). 7-9-chome and parts of 5-chome are zoned to Kyuden Elementary School (給田小学校). 1-8-chome are zoned to Karasuyama Junior High School (烏山中学校) while 9-chome is zoned to Kamisoshigaya Junior High School (上祖師谷中学校).
