= Setagaya =

Special ward in Tokyo, Japan

Setagaya 世田谷区
- Special ward
- City of Setagaya
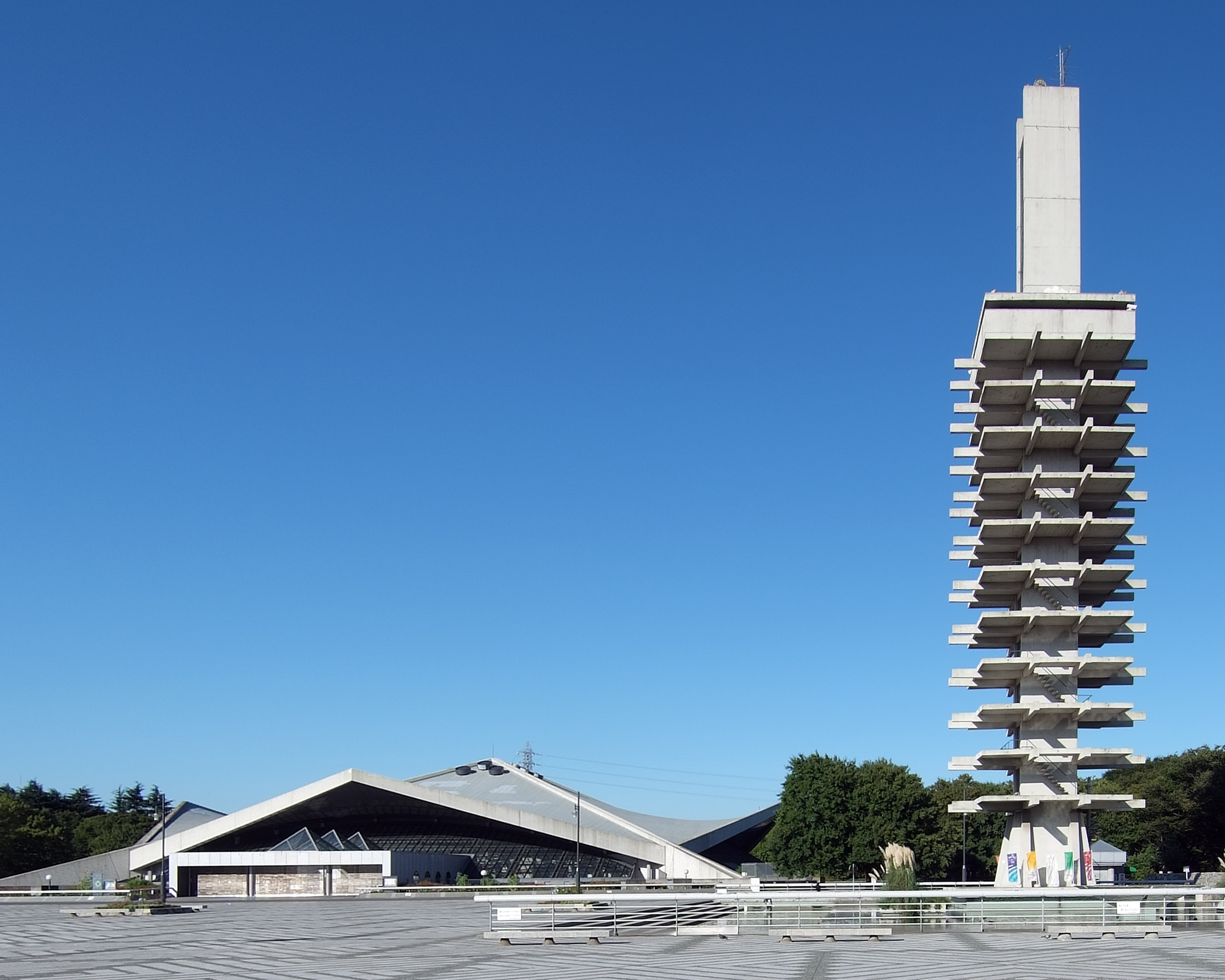
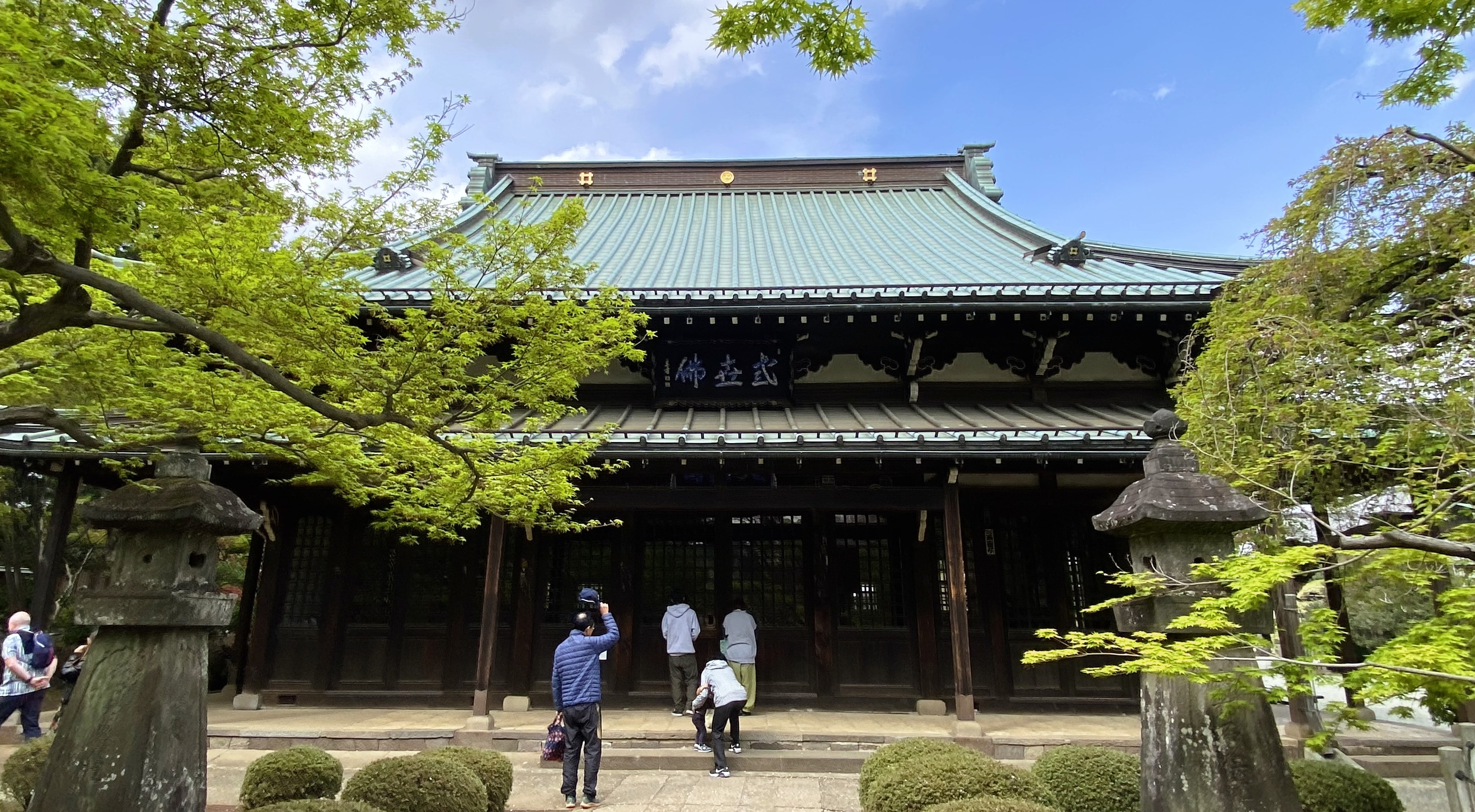
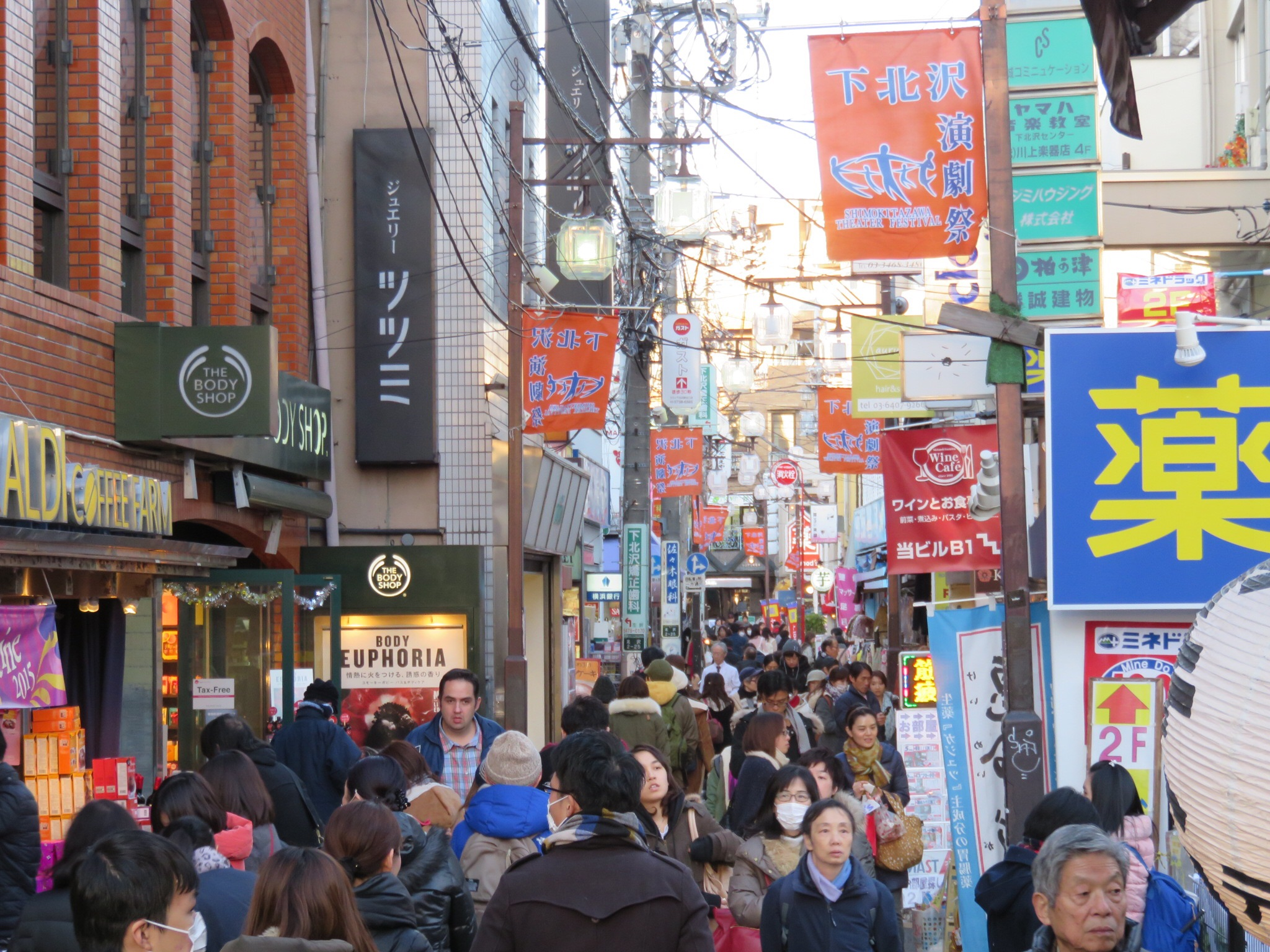
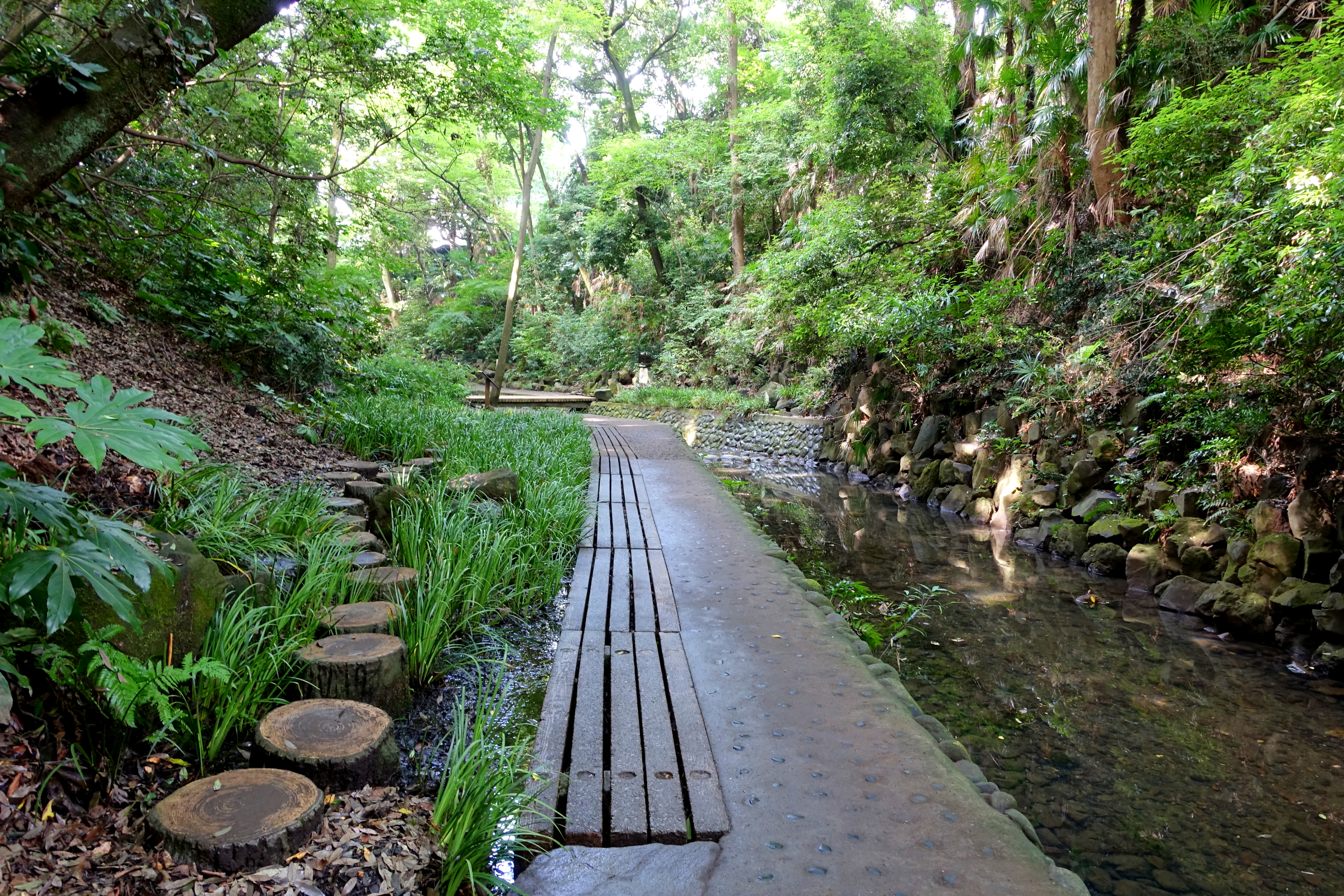
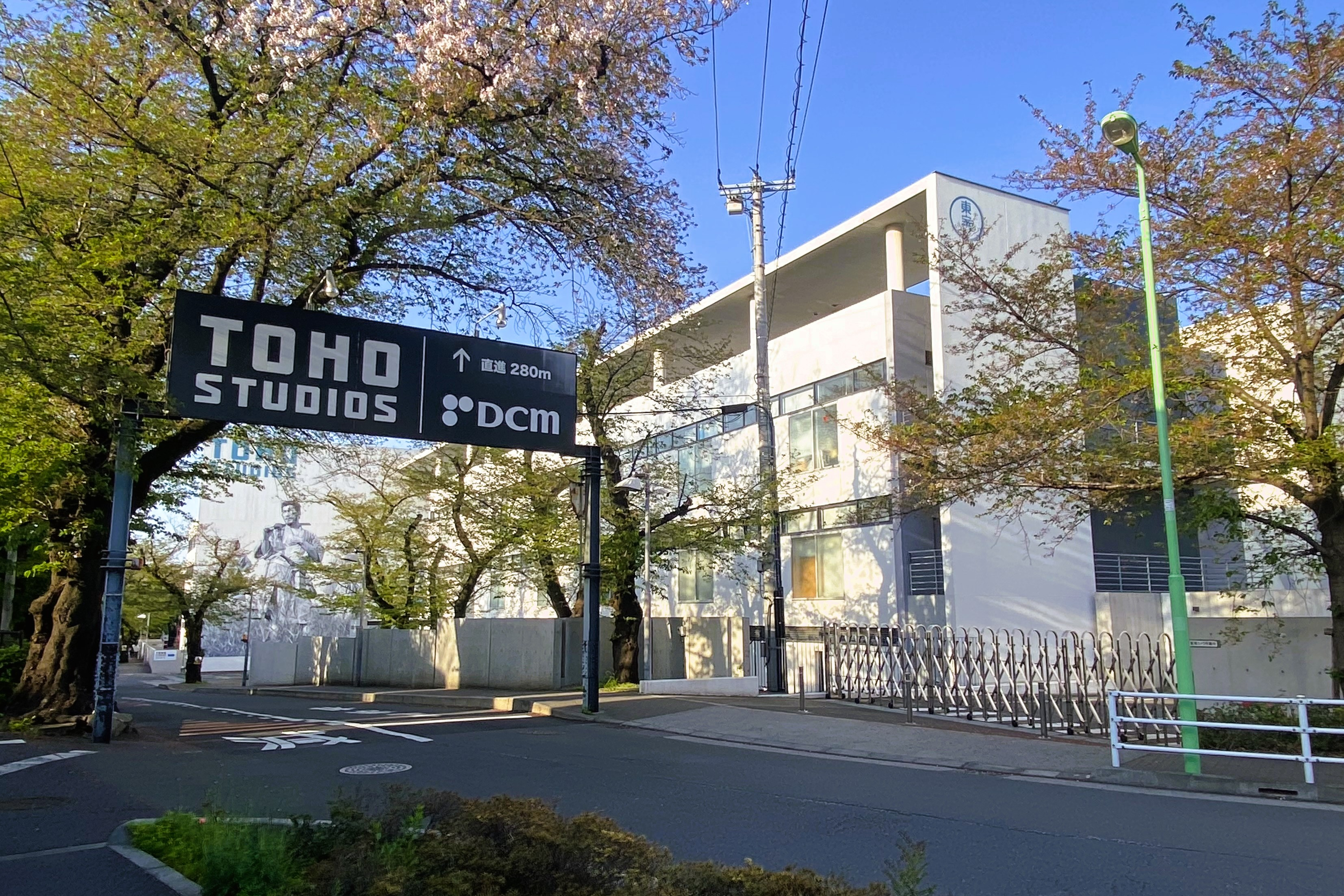
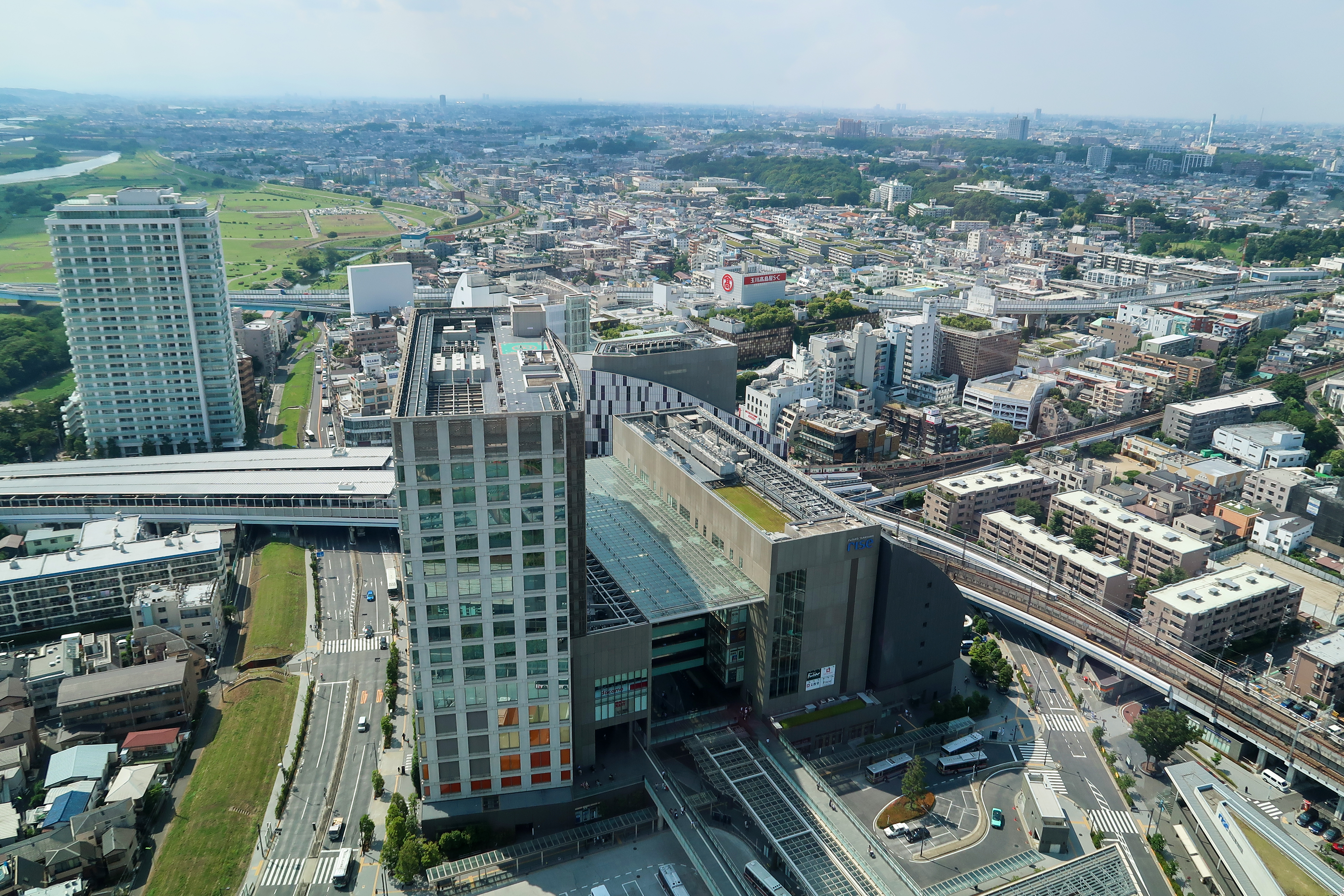
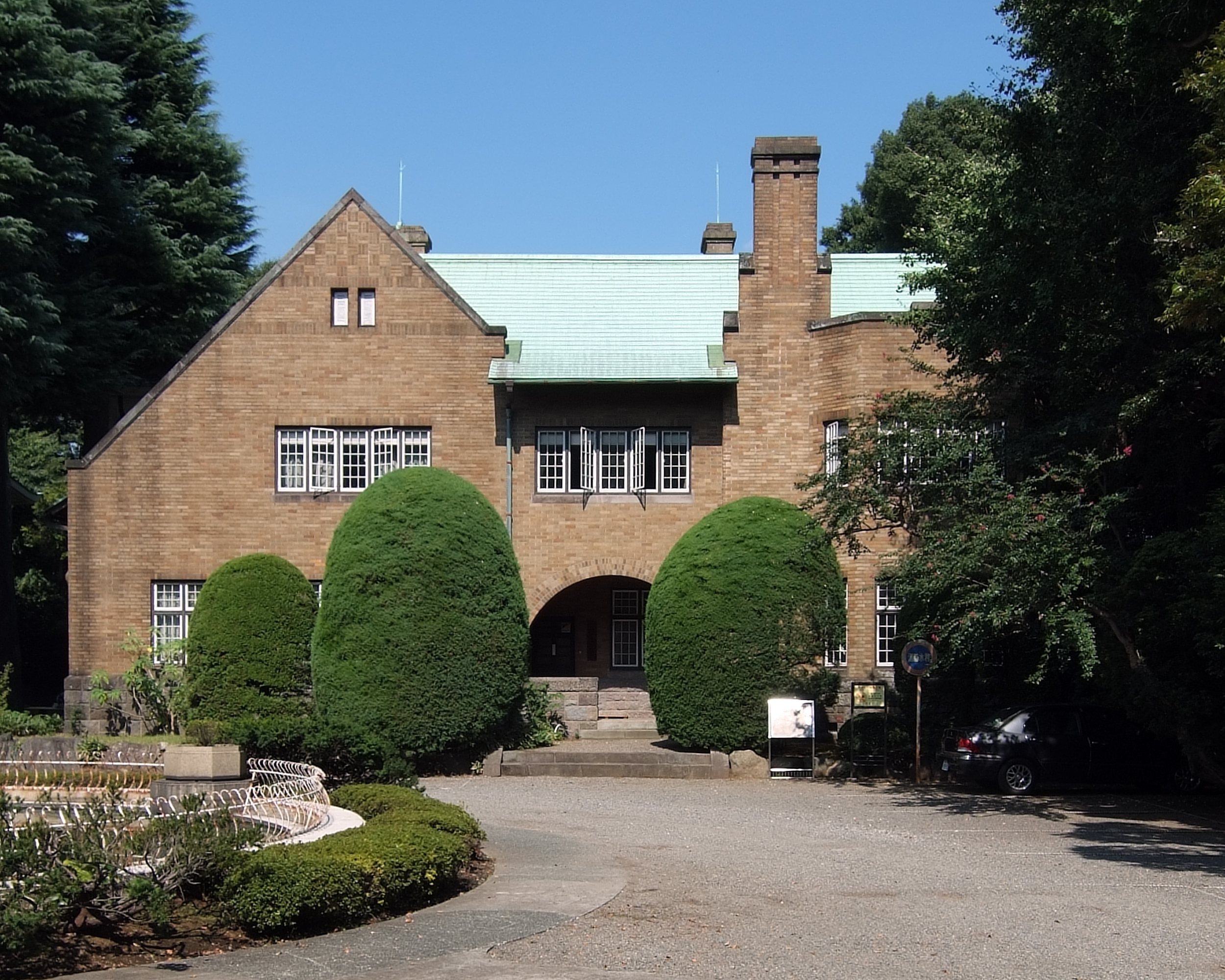
- Komazawa Olympic Park Gōtoku-ji Shimokitazawa Todoroki Valley Toho Studios Futako-Tamagawa Seikadō Bunko Art Museum

- Flag Seal

- Location of Setagaya in Tokyo

- Location in Japan
- Coordinates: 35°38′47.66″N 139°39′11.69″E
- Country: Japan
- Region: Kantō
- Prefecture: Tokyo
- First official recorded: middle 15th century
- As Tokyo City: October 1, 1932
- As Special ward of Tokyo: July 1, 1943

Government
  - Mayor: Nobuto Hosaka (since May 2011)

Area
  - Total: 58.06 km^{2} (22.42 sq mi)

Population (July 1, 2023)
  - Total: 940,071
  - Density: 16,190/km^{2} (41,940/sq mi)
- Time zone: UTC+09:00 (JST)
- Postal code(s): 154 to 158 (First three digits)
- Area code: 03
- Website: www.city.setagaya.lg.jp
- Symbols
- Bird: Azure-winged magpie
- Flower: Habenaria radiata
- Tree: Zelkova serrata

Setagaya (世田谷区, Setagaya-ku; Japanese pronunciation: [sè̞.tä́.ɡä́.jä́(.kɯ̈̀), -ŋä́-]; officially called Setagaya City or the City of Setagaya) is a special ward in the Tokyo Metropolis in Japan. It is also the name of a neighborhood and administrative district within the ward. Its official bird is the azure-winged magpie, its flower is the fringed orchid, and its tree is the Zelkova serrata.

Setagaya has the largest population and second-largest area (after Ōta) of Tokyo's special wards. As of July 1, 2023, the ward has an estimated population of 940,071, and a population density of 16,194 persons per km^{2} with the total area of 58.06 km^{2}.

== Life expectancy ==
As of 2023, the female life expectancy in Setagaya is 88.9 years.

== Geography ==
Setagaya is located at the southwestern corner of the Tokyo's special wards and the Tama River separates the boundary between Tokyo Metropolis and Kanagawa Prefecture.

Setagaya's residential population size is among the highest in Tokyo as there are many residential neighbourhoods within the ward. Setagaya is served by various rail services providing frequent two- to three-minute headway rush-hour services to the busiest train terminals of Shinjuku and Shibuya as well as through service trains which continue travelling on to the Tokyo Metro lines providing direct access to the central commercial and business districts. Most rail lines run parallel from east to west and there are no north to south rail services within Setagaya, except for Setagaya Line light rail.

The ward is divided into five districts. These are Setagaya, Kitazawa, Tamagawa, Kinuta and Karasuyama. The main ward office and municipal assembly (city hall) is located in Setagaya District, but other districts also have their own branch ward offices as a part of the administrative structure. Each branch office provides almost identical services as the main office, but does not provide the services related to municipal assembly.

Most of the land is in the Musashino Tableland. The parts along the Tama River to the south are comparatively low-lying.

== History ==
The special ward of Setagaya was founded on March 15, 1947.

During the Edo period, 42 villages occupied the area. With the abolition of the han system in 1871, the central and eastern portions became part of Tokyo Prefecture while the rest became part of Kanagawa Prefecture; in 1893, some areas were transferred to Tokyo Prefecture. With the establishment of Setagaya Ward (an ordinary ward) in the old Tokyo City in 1932, and further consolidation in 1936, Setagaya took its present boundaries.

During the 1964 Summer Olympics, the district of Karasuyama-machi in Setagaya was part of the athletics marathon and 50 km walk event.

== Demographics ==
Historical population
Year	Pop.	±%
1920	39,952	—
1930	149,323	+273.8%
1940	281,804	+88.7%
1945	276,450	−1.9%
1950	408,226	+47.7%
1960	653,210	+60.0%
1970	787,338	+20.5%
1980	797,292	+1.3%
1990	789,051	−1.0%
2000	814,901	+3.3%
2010	877,138	+7.6%
2020	943,664	+7.6%
Source: Censuses (Note: For years prior to 1930, figures cover the area of present-day Setagaya-ku.)

== Landmarks ==
=== Nature ===
- Tama River
- Todoroki Valley (Yazawa River)

=== Parks ===
- Futako Tamagawa Park
- Hanegi Park
- Kinuta Park
- Kitami Friendship Square
- Komazawa Olympic Park
- Okura Sports Park
- Roka Kōshun-en
- Setagaya Park
- Soshigaya Park
- Tamagawa Nogemachi Park
- Tokyo Equestrian Park

=== Cultural facilities ===
- Gotoh Museum
- Hasegawa Machiko Art Museum
- Honda Theater
- Oya Soichi Bunko, a private library of Japanese magazines for researchers and journalists
- Setagaya Art Museum
- Setagaya Daikan Yashiki, a daikan's office built in 1737, an Important Cultural Property of Japan
- Setagaya Literary Museum
- Setagaya Local History Museum
- Setagaya Public Theatre
- Tokyo University of Agriculture Food and Agriculture Museum

=== Religious facilities ===
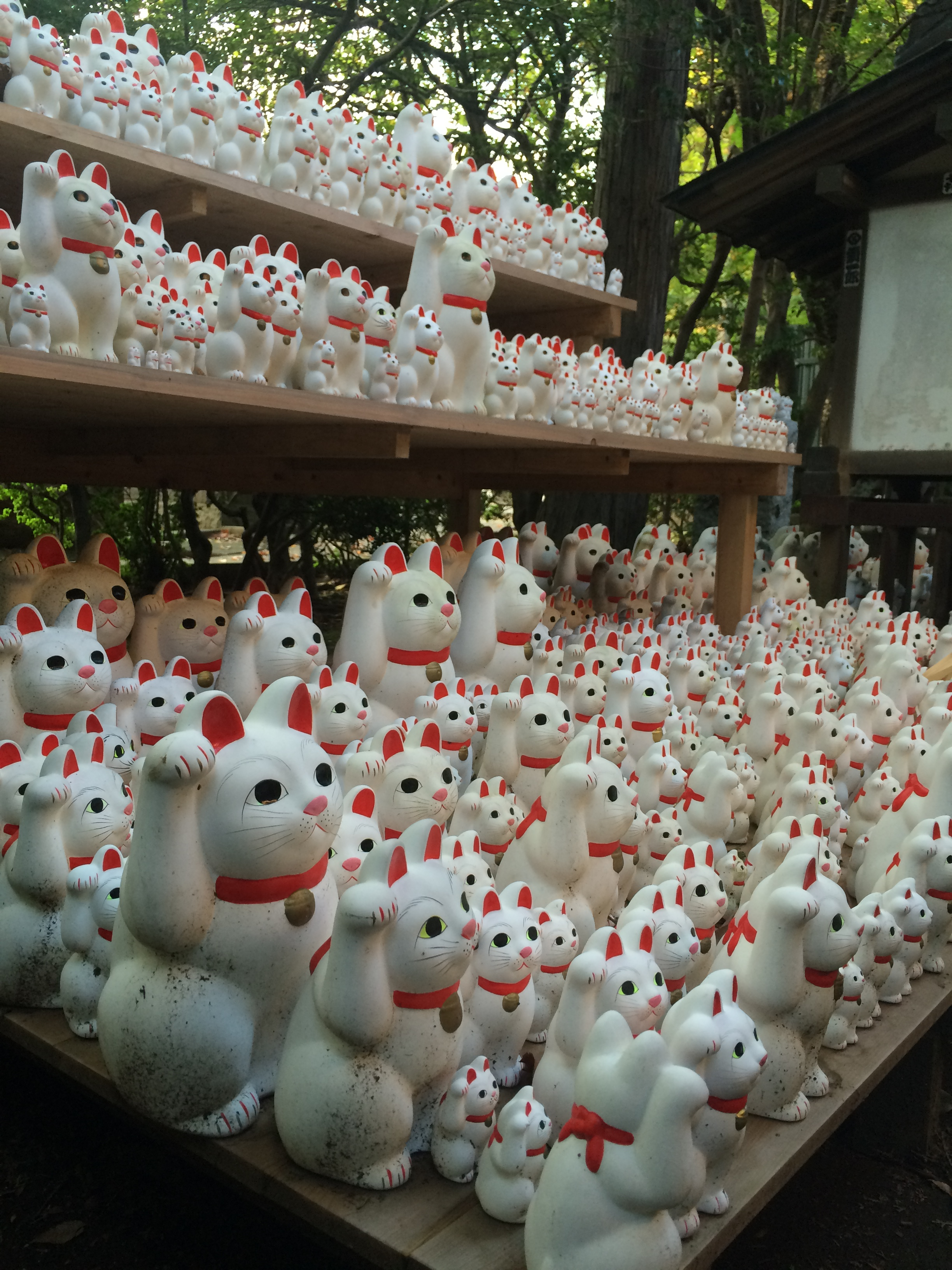
Gōtoku-ji

- Gōtoku-ji, a Zen temple known as birthplace of maneki-neko, with grave of Ii Naosuke who was assassinated in the Sakuradamon Incident in 1860
- Kuhonbutsu Jōshin-ji, a Buddhist temple on Okusawa Castle ruins
- Catholic Seta Church, Seta Monastery
- Setagaya Hachimangū, a Shintō shrine, a major religious centre from the late Heian period to the end of the Edo period
- Shōin shrine
- Todoroki Fudōson
- Zenyōmitsu-ji

=== Others ===
- Carrot Tower
- Futako-Tamagawa Rise
- NHK Science & Technology Research Laboratories
- Setagaya Business Square (SBS)
- Setagaya Castle ruins
- Toho Studios
- Tokyo Metropolitan Matsuzawa Hospital

== Districts and neighborhoods ==
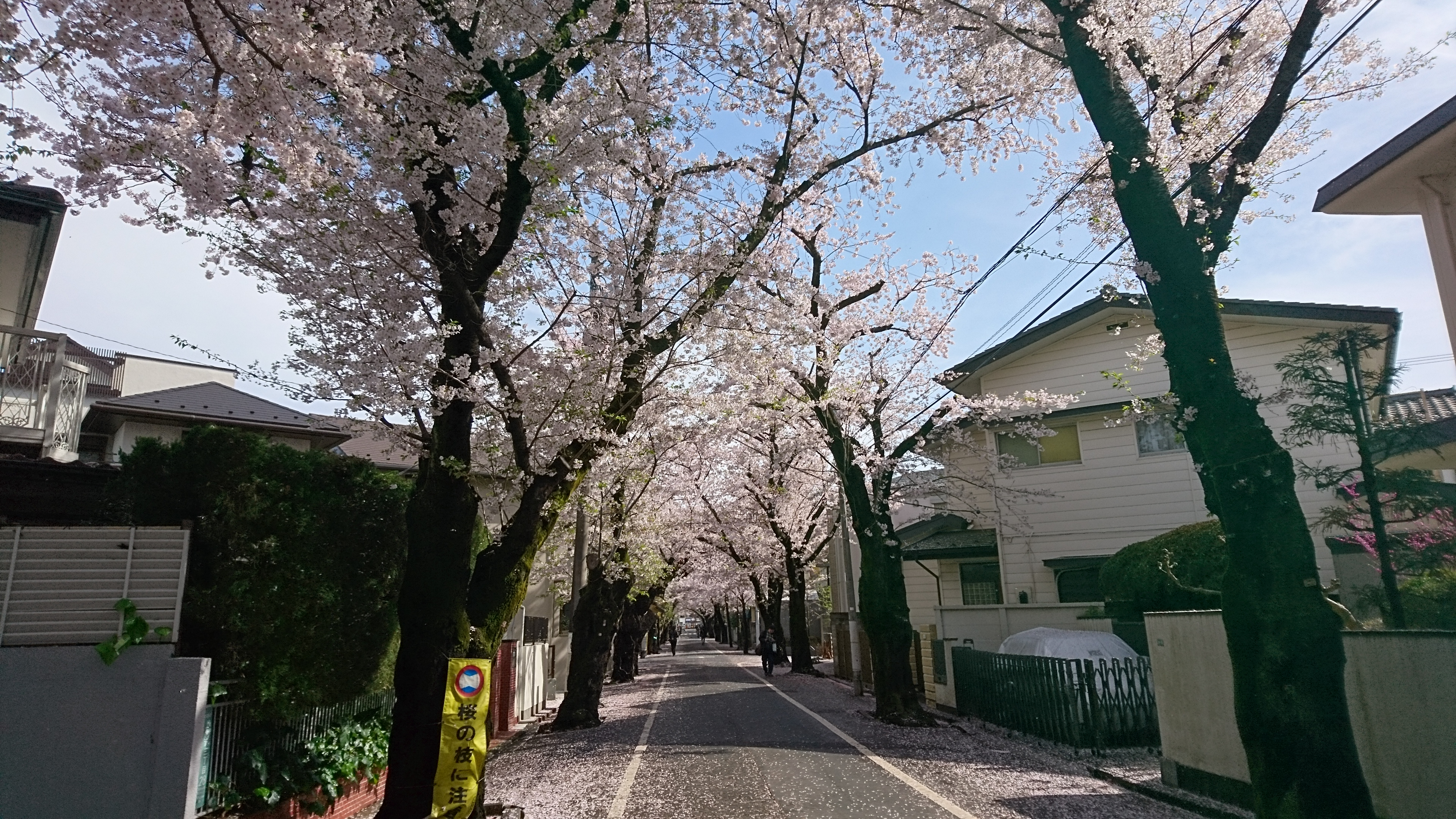
Kamikitazawa

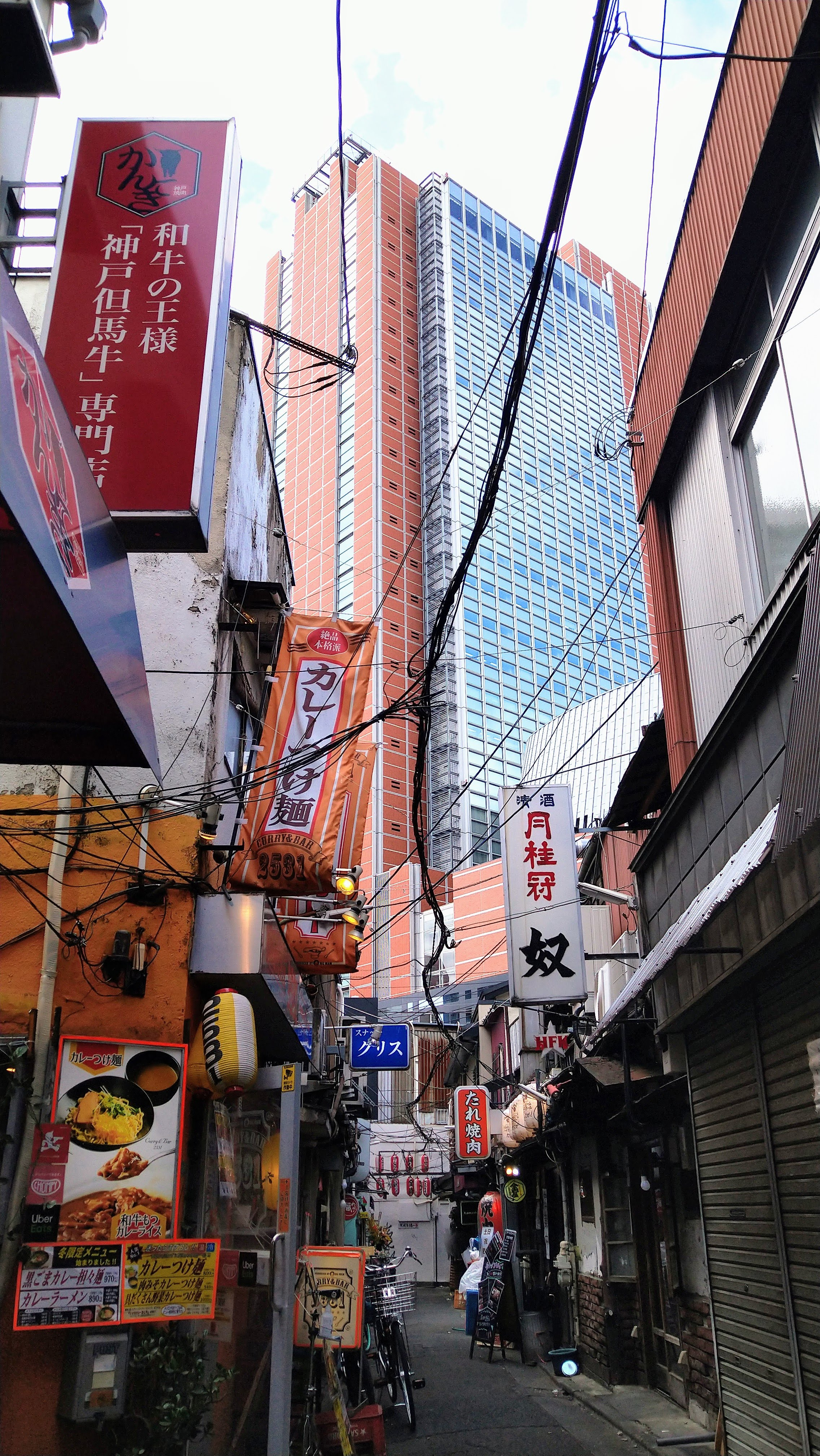
Sangenjaya

Karasuyama Area

- Hachimanyama
- Kamikitazawa
- Kamisoshigaya
- Kitakarasuyama
- Kasuya
- Kyūden
- Minamikarasuyama

Kinuta Area

- Chitosedai
- Funabashi
- Kamata
- Kinuta
- Kinutakōen
- Kitami
- Okamoto
- Ōkura
- Seijō
- Soshigaya
- Unane

Kitazawa Area

- Akatsutsumi
- Daita
- Daizawa
- Gōtokuji
- Hanegi
- Ikejiri^{a}
- Kitazawa (including Shimokitazawa)
- Matsubara
- Ōhara
- Sakurajōsui
- Umegaoka

Setagaya Area

- Shimouma
- Ikejiri^{b}
- Kamiuma
- Komazawa^{c}
- Kyōdō
- Mishuku
- Miyasaka
- Nozawa
- Sakura
- Sakuragaoka
- Sangenjaya
- Setagaya
- Taishidō
- Tsurumaki
- Wakabayashi

Tamagawa Area

- Fukazawa
- Higashitamagawa
- Kaminoge
- Kamiyōga
- Komazawa^{d}
- Komazawakōen
- Nakamachi
- Noge
- Okusawa
- Oyamadai
- Sakurashinmachi
- Seta
- Shinmachi
- Tamazutsumi
- Tamagawa
- Tamagawadai
- Tamagawa-Den'enchōfu
- Todoroki
- Yōga
- Futako-Tamagawa

Notes:
^{a} – 4-chōme (33-ban to 39-ban)
^{b} – 1, 2, 3-chōme, 4-chōme (1-ban to 32-ban)
^{c} – 1, 2-chōme
^{d} – 3, 4-chōme

== Transportation ==
=== Rail ===
- Keio Corporation
  - Keiō Line: Daitabashi, Meidai-mae, Shimo Takaido, Sakura Josui, Kami Kitazawa, Hachiman Yama, Roka Koen, Chitose-Karasuyama Stations
  - Keio Inokashira Line: Ikenoue, Shimo-Kitazawa, Shindaita, Higashi-Matsubara, Meidaimae Stations
- Odakyu Electric Railway
  - Odawara Line: Higashi-Kitazawa, Shimo-Kitazawa, Setagaya-Daita, Umegaoka, Gōtokuji, Kyōdō, Chitose-Funabashi, Soshigaya-Ōkura, Seijōgakuen-Mae, Kitami Stations
- Tokyu Corporation
  - Den-en-toshi Line: Ikejiri Ohashi, Sangen-Jaya, Komazawa Daigaku, Sakura Shinmachi, Yōga, Futako-Tamagawa Stations
  - Meguro Line: Okusawa Station
  - Oimachi Line: Midorigaoka, (Jiyūgaoka), Kuhon-butsu, Oyamadai, Todoroki, Kaminoge, Futako-Tamagawa Stations
  - Setagaya Line (LRT): Sangen-Jaya, Nishi Taishido, Wakabayashi, Shoin Jinja-mae, Setagaya, Kami Machi, Miyanosaka, Yamashita, Matsubara, Shimo Takaido Stations
  - Toyoko Line: (Jiyūgaoka Station)

=== Road ===
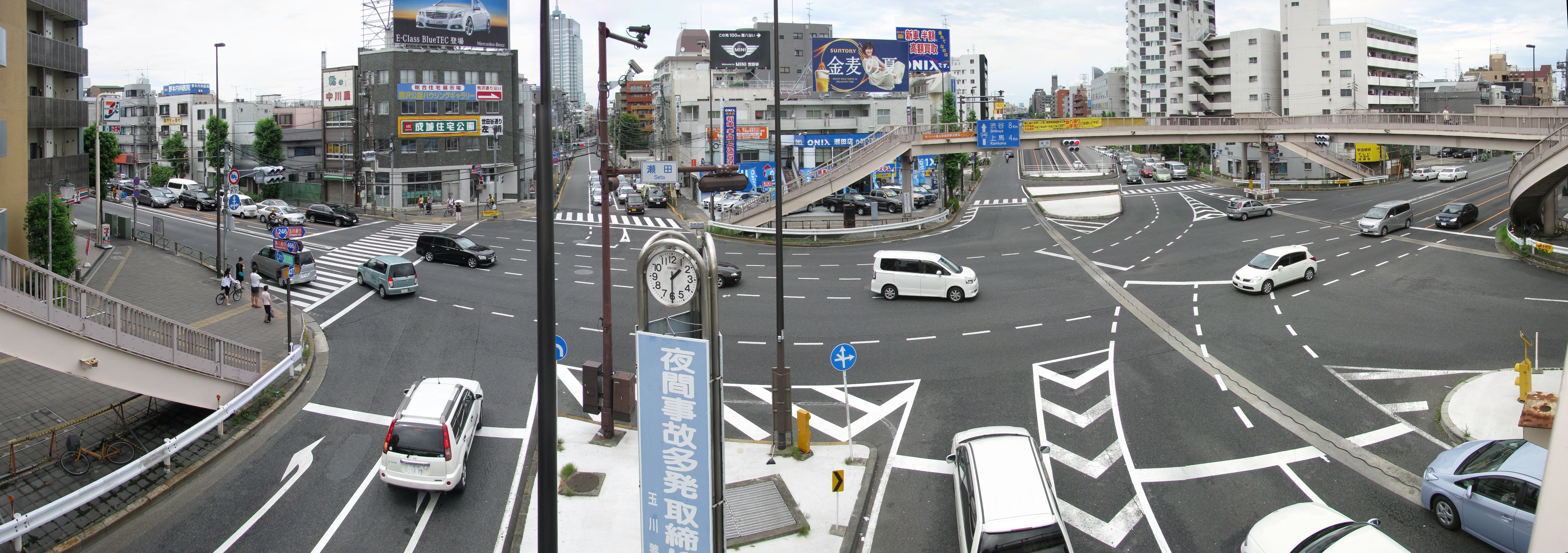
Seta Intersection at Seta, Setagaya in 2010

==== Expressways ====
- Tōmei Expressway ( Asian Highway 1)
- Chūō Expressway
- Daisan Keihin Road
- Shuto Expressway
  - No. 3 Shibuya Route
  - No. 4 Shinjuku Route

==== National highways ====
- National Route 20 "Kōshū Kaidō"
- National Route 246 "Tamagawa Dōri"
- National Route 466

==== Prefecture roads ====
- Tokyo Metropolitan Road 3 "Setagaya Dōri"
- Tokyo Metropolitan Road 311 "Kanpachi Dōri"
- Tokyo Metropolitan Road 312 "Meguro Dōri"
- Tokyo Metropolitan Road 318 "Kan-nana Dōri"
- Tokyo Metropolitan Road 416 "Komazawa Dōri"

== Politics ==
On April 25, 2011, amid national concern over the safety of nuclear power triggered by the March 11 earthquake and Fukushima I nuclear accidents, former Social Democratic Party House of Representatives legislator Nobuto Hosaka was elected mayor on an anti-nuclear platform. Prior to becoming mayor, Hosaka was also well known for his staunch opposition of the death penalty and his defense of Japan's Otaku culture.

== Economy ==
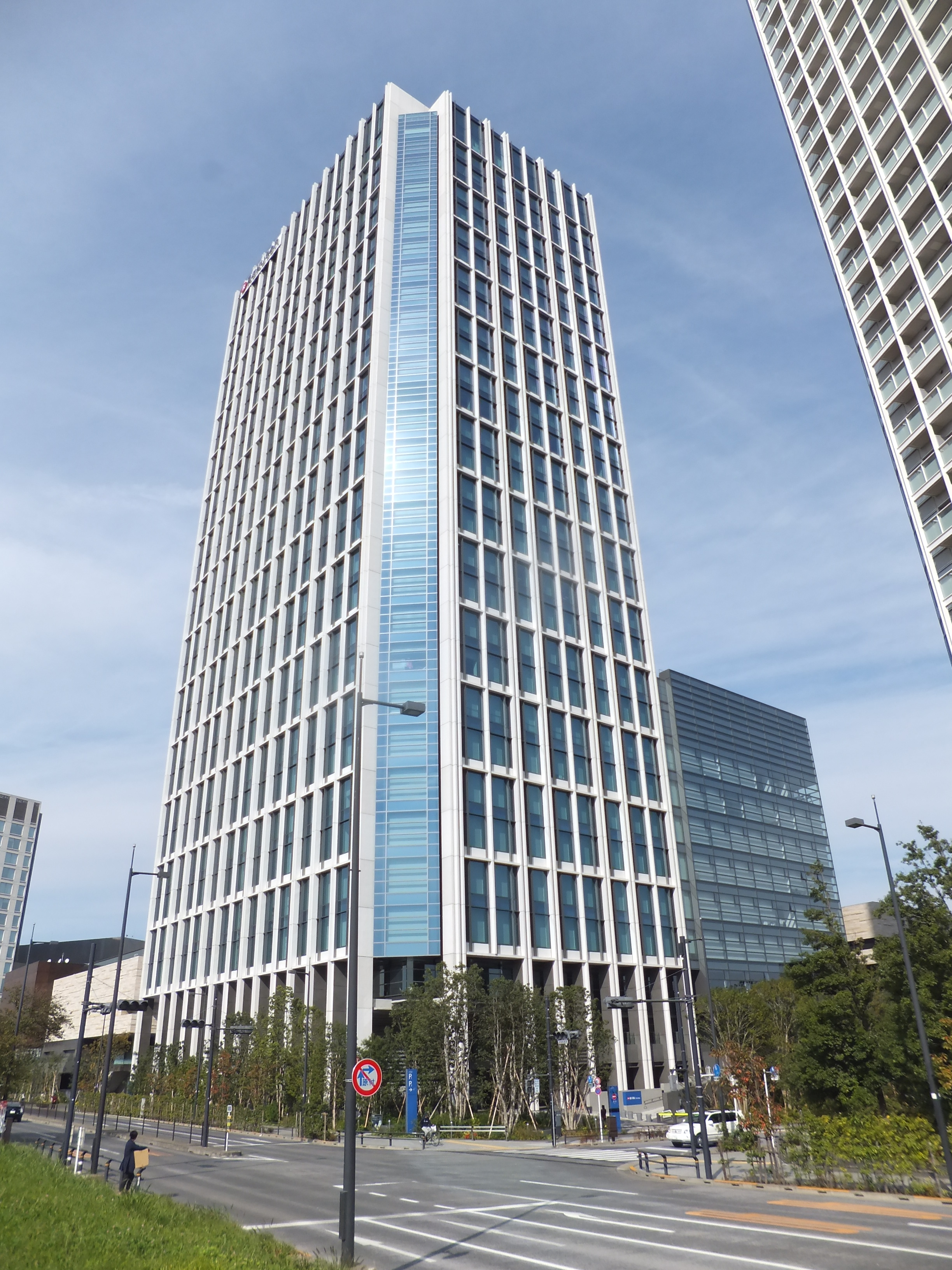
Rakuten Crimson House

- Rakuten has its headquarters building "Rakuten Crimson House" in Setagaya.
- Toho has studio facilities in Setagaya.
- OLM, Inc. has its studios in Setagaya.

== Education ==
=== Higher education ===
- Central Theological College, Tokyo
- Japan Women's College of Physical Education
- Kokushikan University
- Komazawa University
- Nihon University
- Nippon Sport Science University
- Sanno Institute of Management
- Seijo University
- Showa Women's University
- Tama Art University Kaminoge Campus
- Temple University Japan Campus
- Tokyo City University
- Tokyo Healthcare University Setagaya Campus
- Tokyo University of Agriculture

=== Primary and secondary education ===
==== National schools ====
These are schools operated by agencies of the central Government of Japan.

- Tokyo Gakugei University Senior High School
- Setagaya Junior High School attached to Tokyo Gakugei University
- Junior and Senior High School at Komaba, University of Tsukuba
- Setagaya Elementary School attached to Tokyo Gakugei University (東京学芸大学附属世田谷小学校)

==== Metropolitan senior high schools ====
The Tokyo Metropolitan Government Board of Education operates following senior high schools in Setagaya.

- Tokyo Metropolitan Chitosegaoka High School
- Tokyo Metropolitan Comprehensive Industrial High School
- Tokyo Metropolitan Engei High School
- Tokyo Metropolitan Fukasawa High School
- Tokyo Metropolitan Matsubara High School
- Tokyo Metropolitan Roka High School
- Tokyo Metropolitan Sakuramachi High School
- Tokyo Metropolitan Setagaya Izumi High School
- Tokyo Metropolitan Setagaya Sogo High School
- Tokyo Metropolitan Setagaya Technical High School
- Tokyo Metropolitan Tamagawa High School

==== Municipal junior high schools ====
The Setagaya City Board of Education operates 29 junior high schools in Setagaya.

They are:

- Chitose Junior High School (千歳中学校)
- Fuji Junior High School (富士中学校)
- Fukasawa Junior High School (深沢中学校)
- Funabashi Kibo Junior High School (船橋希望中学校)
- Higashi Fukasawa Junior High School (東深沢中学校)
- Kamisoshigaya Junior High School (上祖師谷中学校)
- Karasuyama Junior High School (烏山中学校)
- Kinuta Junior High School (砧中学校)
- Kinuta Minami Junior High School (砧南中学校)
- Kitami Junior High School (喜多見中学校)
- Kitazawa Junior High School (北沢中学校)
- Komadome Junior High School (駒留中学校)
- Komazawa Junior High School (駒沢中学校)
- Matsuzawa Junior High School (松沢中学校)
- Midorigaoka Junior High School (緑丘中学校)
- Mishuku Junior High School (三宿中学校)
- Osukawa Junior High School (奥沢中学校)
- Oyamadai Junior High School (尾山台中学校)
- Roka Junior High School (芦花中学校)
- Sakuragaoka Junior High School (桜丘中学校)
- Sakuragi Junior High School (桜木中学校)
- Seta Junior High School (瀬田中学校)
- Setagaya Junior High School (世田谷中学校)
- Taishido Junior High School (太子堂中学校)
- Tamagawa Junior High School (玉川中学校)
- Tsurumaki Junior High School (弦巻中学校)
- Umegaoka Junior High School (梅丘中学校)
- Yahata Junior High School (八幡中学校)
- Yoga Junior High School (用賀中学校)

Former schools:

- Funabashi Junior High School (船橋中学校)
- Ikejiri Junior High School (池尻中学校)
- Kibogaoka Junior High School (希望丘中学校)
- Wakabayashi Junior High School (若林中学校)
- Yamazaki Junior High School (山崎中学校)

==== Municipal elementary schools ====
The Setagaya City Board of Education operates 61 elementary schools in Setagaya.

They are:

- Akazutsumi Elementary School (赤堤小学校)
- Asahi Elementary School (旭小学校)
- Chitose Elementary School (千歳小学校)
- Chitosedai Elementary School (千歳台小学校)
- Daita Elementary School (代田小学校)
- Daizawa Elementary School (代沢小学校)
- Fukasawa Elementary School (深沢小学校)
- Funabashi Elementary School (船橋小学校)
- Futako Tamagawa Elementary School (二子玉川小学校)
- Hachimanyama Elementary School (八幡山小学校)
- Higashi Fukasawa Elementary School (東深沢小学校)
- Higashi Tamagawa Elementary School (東玉川小学校)
- Kamikitazawa Elementary School (上北沢小学校)
- Karasuyama Elementary School (烏山小学校)
- Karasuyama Kita Elementary School (烏山北小学校)
- Kibogaoka Elementary School (希望丘小学校)
- Kinuta Elementary School (砧小学校)
- Kinuta Minami Elementary School (砧南小学校)
- Kitami Elementary School (喜多見小学校)
- Komatsunagi Elementary School (駒繋小学校)
- Komazawa Elementary School (駒沢小学校)
- Kuhonbutsu Elementary School (九品仏小学校)
- Kyodo Elementary School (経堂小学校)
- Kyosai Elementary School (京西小学校)
- Kyuden Elementary School (給田小学校)
- Ikejiri Elementary School (池尻小学校)
- Ikenoue Elementary School (池之上小学校)
- Matsubara Elementary School (松原小学校)
- Matsugaoka Elementary School (松丘小学校)
- Matsuzawa Elementary School (松沢小学校)
- Meisei Elementary School (明正小学校)
- Mishuku Elementary School (三宿小学校)
- Musashigaoka Elementary School (武蔵丘小学校)
- Nakamachi Elementary School (中町小学校)
- Nakamaru Elementary School (中丸小学校)
- Nakazato Elementary School (中里小学校)
- Okusawa Elementary School (奥沢小学校)
- Oyamadai Elementary School (尾山台小学校)
- Roka Elementary School (芦花小学校)
- Sakura Elementary School (桜小学校)
- Sakuragaoka Elementary School (桜丘小学校)
- Sakuramachi Elementary School (桜町小学校)
- Sangenjaya Elementary School (三軒茶屋小学校)
- Sasahara Elementary School (笹原小学校)
- Seta Elementary School (瀬田小学校)
- Setagaya Elementary School (世田谷小学校)
- Shimokitazawa Elementary School (下北沢小学校)
- Shiroyama Elementary School (城山小学校)
- Soshigaya Elementary School (祖師谷小学校)
- Taishido Elementary School (太子堂小学校)
- Tamagawa Elementary School (玉川小学校)
- Tamazutsumi Elementary School (玉堤小学校)
- Tamon Elementary School (多聞小学校)
- Todoroki Elementary School (等々力小学校)
- Tsukado Elementary School (塚戸小学校)
- Tsurumaki Elementary School (弦巻小学校)
- Wakabayashi Elementary School (若林小学校)
- Yahata Elementary School (八幡小学校)
- Yamazaki Elementary School (山崎小学校)
- Yamano Elementary School (山野小学校)
- Yoga Elementary School (用賀小学校)

Former schools:

- Hanamido Elementary School (花見堂小学校)
- Higashi Ohara Elementary School (東大原小学校)
- Kitazawa Elementary School (北沢小学校)
- Moriyama Elementary School (守山小学校)

==== Private secondary schools ====
* Daito Gakuen High School
- Den-en Chofu Gakuen Junior & Senior High School
- Denenchofufutaba Gakuen Junior and Senior High School
- Japan Women's College of Physical Education Nikaido High School
- Japan Women's University affiliated Homei High School and Junior High School
- Kagaku Gijutsu Gakuen High School
- Keisen Jogakuen High School
- Kokushikan Senior High School and Kokushikan Junior High School
- Komaba Gakuen High School
- Komaba Toho Junior and Senior High School
- Komazawa University Senior High School
- Kosei Gakuen Girls' High School
- Kunimoto Girls Junior and Senior High School[[]]
- Meguro Seibi Gakuen Junior & Senior High School
- MITA International School
- Nihon Gakuen Junior and Senior High School
- Nihon University Sakuragaoka High School
- Ohyu Gakuen Girls' Junior and Senior High School
- St. Dominic's Junior and Senior High School
- Seijo Gakuen Junior High School and High School
- Setagaya Gakuen School
- Shimokitazawa Seitoku Senior High School
- Shoin University Shoin Junior and Senior High School
- Showa Women's University Junior-Senior High School
- Tamagawa Seigakuin Girls' Junior & Senior High School
- Tokyo City University Junior and Senior High School
- Tokyo City University Todoroki Junior and Senior High School
- Tokyo University of Agriculture First High School and Junior High School

==== Private elementary schools ====
- Denenchofufutaba Gakuen Elementary School
- Kunimoto Elementary School
- St. Dominic's Elementary School
- Seijo Gakuen Elementary School
- Showa Women's University Showa Elementary School
- Tokyo City University Elementary School
- Wako Elementary School

==== Special education schools ====
- Tokyo Metropolitan Komyo Gakuen
- Tokyo Metropolitan Kugayama Blind School
- Tokyo Metropolitan Seicho Special Support School

=== International schools ===
- Kunimoto Alberta International School
- St. Mary's International School
- Seisen International School
- British School in Tokyo Showa Campus at Showa Women's University
- Tokyo International Progressive School

Former international schools:

- Tokyo No. 8 Korean Elementary School (東京朝鮮第八初級学校) – North Korean school

== International relations ==
=== Sister cities ===
- Bunbury City in Australia (since 1992)
- Döbling District, Vienna City in Austria (since 1985)
- Winnipeg City in Canada (since 1970)

=== Diplomatic missions in Setagaya ===
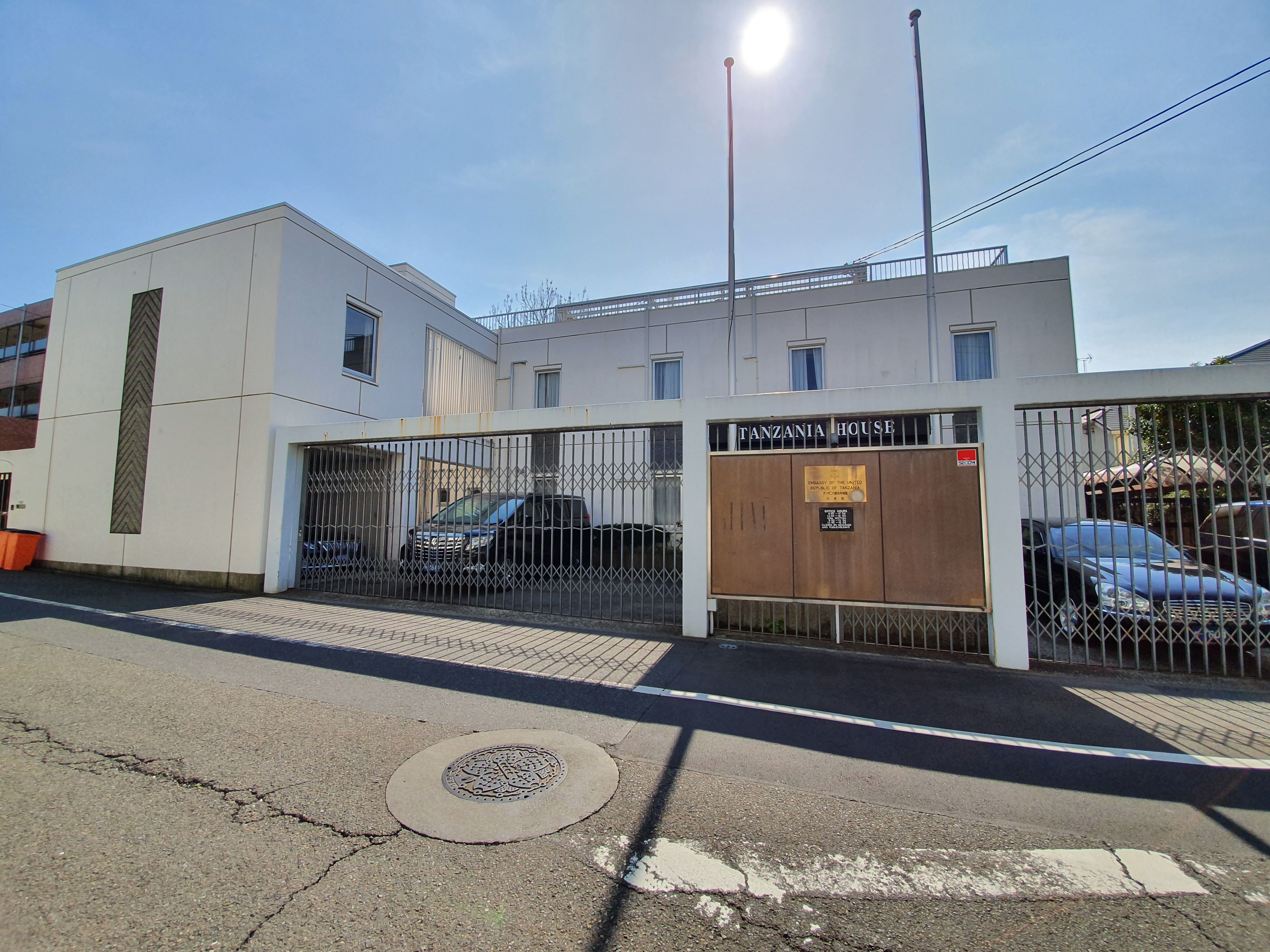
Embassy of Tanzania in Kamiyōga, Setagaya

- Embassy of the Republic of Angola
- Embassy of the Republic of Cameroon
- Embassy of Mozambique
- Embassy of Rwanda
- Embassy of Tanzania
- Honorary Consulate-General of the Central African Republic in Tokyo

== Notable people from Setagaya ==
=== Politics ===
- Yasuo Fukuda, Politician, 91st Prime Minister
- Akiko Santō, Politician, 32nd President of the House of Councillors
- Hiroya Masuda, Politician, Governor of Iwate Prefecture, Minister for Internal Affairs and Communications
- Akira Koike, Politician, Secretary-General of the Japanese Communist Party

=== Economics ===
- Nobuyuki Idei, Former CEO of Sony

=== Culture ===
- Kuniko Mukōda, Screenwriter, Novelist, Essayist
- Kōki Mitani, Playwright, Screenwriter, Theatre director
- Shirō Sagisu, Composer
- Kyoko Okazaki, Manga artist
- Motoka Murakami, Manga artist
- Hideo Kojima, Video game designer best known as the creator of the Metal Gear franchise
- Satoshi Tajiri, Video game designer and director best known as the creator of the Pokémon media franchise

=== Sports ===
- Fighting Harada, World boxing champion
- Emi Watanabe, Figure skater
- Yuki Kawauchi, Marathon runner
- Shūichi Gonda, Professional football player
- Naoto Arai, Professional football player
- Yoshinori Muto, Professional football player
- Kaz Hayashi, Professional wrestler
- Shota Umino, Professional wrestler
- Yuki Kunii, Motorcycle racer

=== Entertainment ===
- Akiko Kojima, Miss Universe 1959
- Kiichi Nakai, Actor
- Yoshino Kimura, Actress
- Eiko Koike, Actress
- Sayaka Kanda, Singer, Actress
- Keigo Oyamada, Musician
- Shinji Sato, Musician
- Noritake Kinashi, Comedian, Actor, Singer, Artist
- Mika Kanai, Voice actress
- Rei Sakuma, Voice actress
- Shino Kakinuma, Voice actress
- Ichirou Mizuki, Singer, Voice actor
- Matt Kuwata, Model, Musician, Media personality
- Mariko Kawana, Porn actress, Erotic novelist, Human rights activist

=== Others ===
- Fusako Shigenobu, Terrorist, Leader of the Japanese Red Army
- Akihiko Hoshide, Astronaut

== See also ==
- Setagaya family murder
