= Kyūden, Setagaya =

Kyūden 給田
- District
- Location within Special wards of Tokyo
- Coordinates: 35°39′44.72″N 139°35′24.89″E
- Country: Japan
- City: Tokyo
- Ward: Setagaya

Population (September 1, 2019)
  - Total: 12,953
- Time zone: UTC+9 (JST)
- Postal code: 157-0064
- Area code: 03

Kyūden (給田) is a district of Setagaya, Tokyo, Japan.

== Education ==
Setagaya Board of Education operates public elementary and junior high schools.

1-2 chome and part of 3-chome are zoned to Karasuyama Elementary School (烏山小学校). 4-5 chome and the rest of 3-chome are zoned to Kyuden Elementary School (給田小学校). All of Kyuden is zoned to Kamisoshigaya Junior High School (上祖師谷中学校).
