= Hachimanyama, Tokyo =

Hachimanyama 八幡山
- District
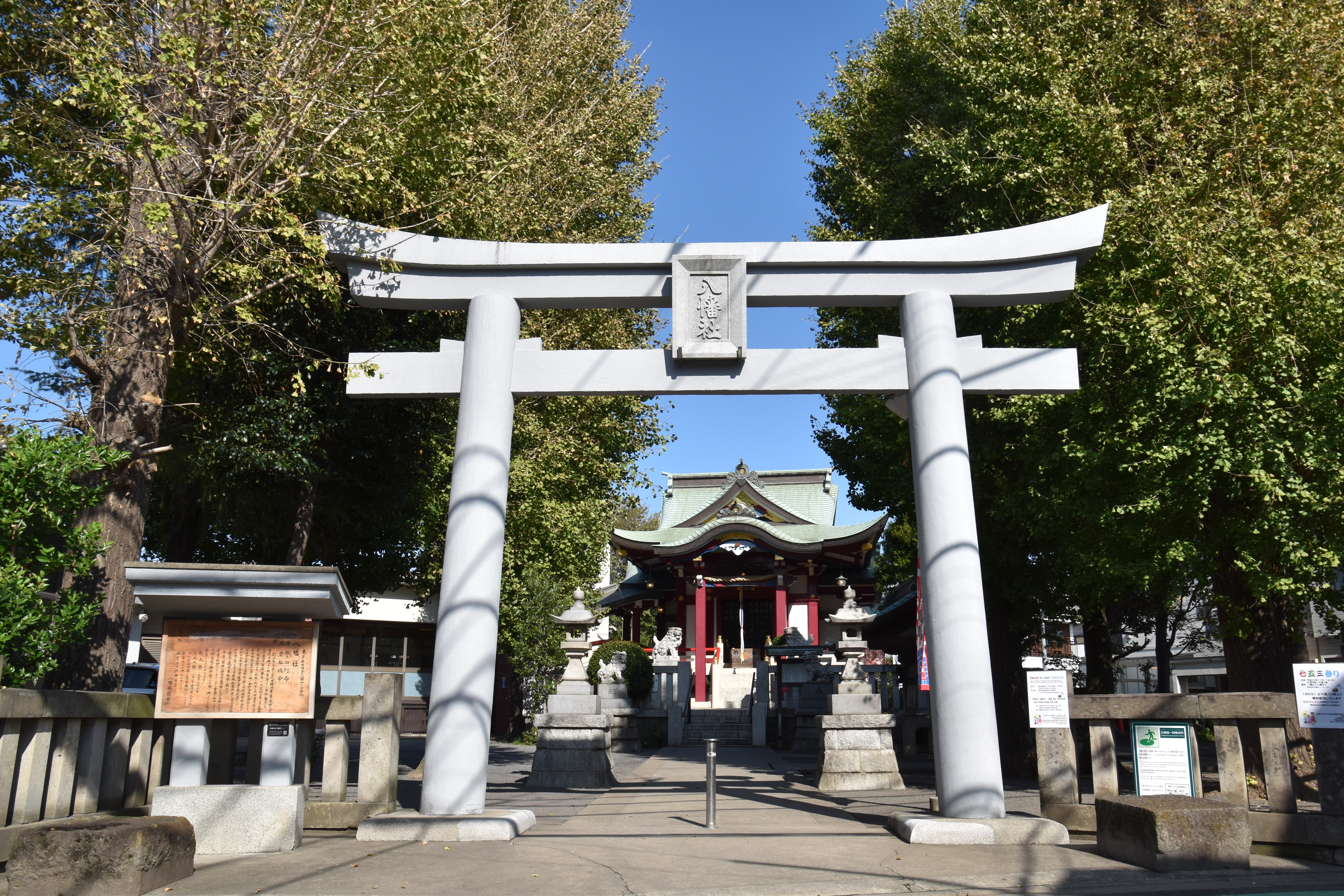

- Location within Special wards of Tokyo Location within Tokyo
- Coordinates: 35°39′47.41″N 139°37′12.52″E
- Country: Japan
- City: Tokyo
- Ward: Setagaya

Population (September 1, 2019)
  - Total: 7,797
- Time zone: UTC+9 (JST)
- Postal code: 156-0056
- Area code: 03

Hachimanyama (八幡山) is a district of Setagaya, Tokyo, Japan.

== Education ==
Setagaya Board of Education operates public elementary and junior high schools.

All of 1-chome and parts of 2 and 3-chome are zoned to Hachimanyama Elementary School (八幡山小学校). The remainder of 2 and 3 chome are zoned to Roka Elementary School (芦花小学校). All of 1-chome and parts of 2-chome are zoned to Midorigaoka Junior High School (緑丘中学校). All of 3-chome and parts of 2-chome are zoned to Roka Junior High School (芦花中学校).
