= Yoyogi =

Neighborhood in Shibuya-ku, Tokyo

Coordinates: 35°40′26″N 139°41′12″E

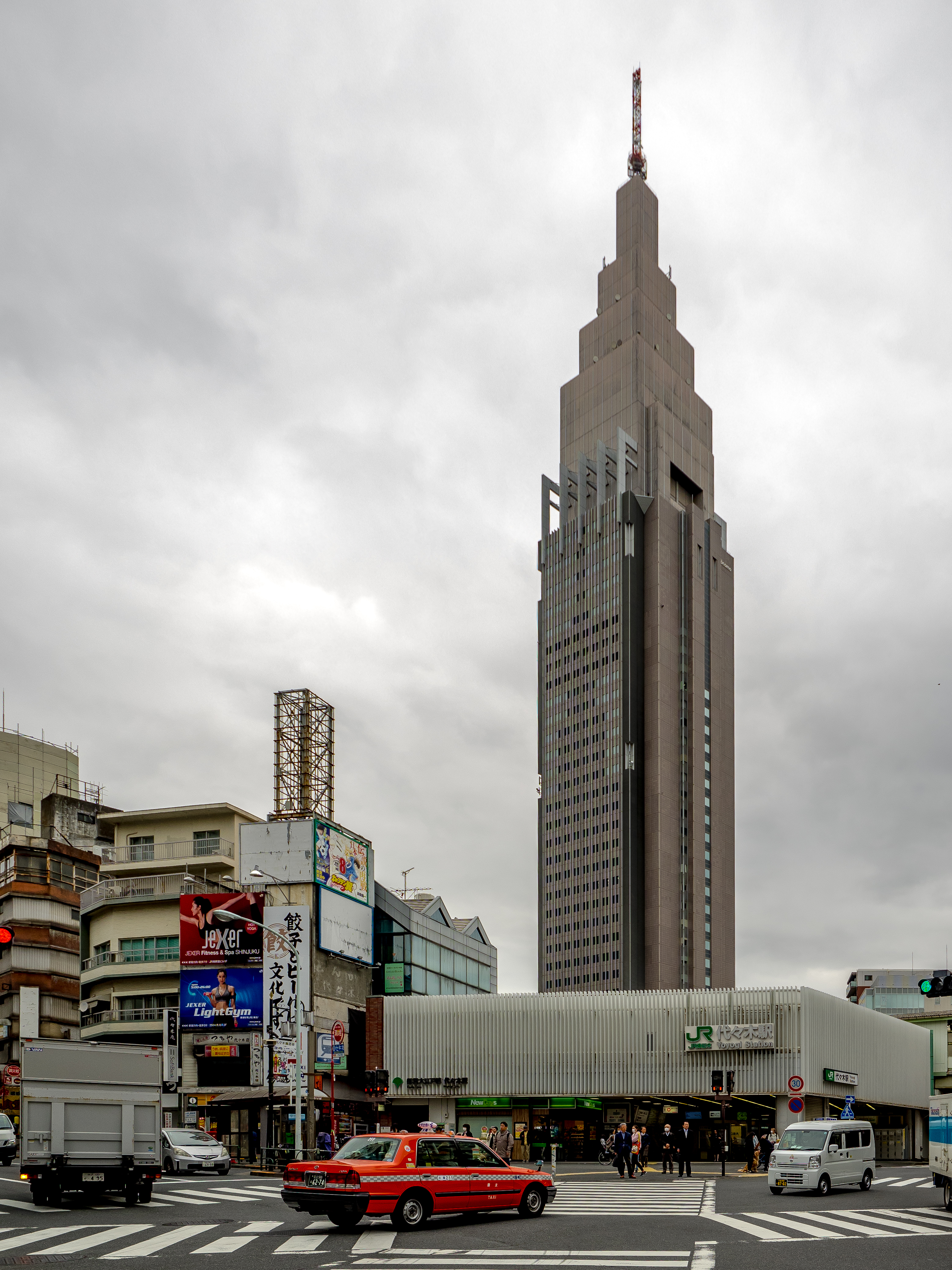
NTT Docomo Yoyogi Building & JR Yoyogi Station

Yoyogi (代々木) is a neighbourhood in the northern part of Shibuya, Tokyo, Japan.

== Geography ==
The area encompassed by Yoyogi is typically defined two ways:

- Only the five Yoyogi districts (丁目, chōme).
- The former Yoyogi Village (代々木村, -mura), corresponding roughly to the area south of National Route 20 (Kōshū-kaidō), east of Tokyo Route 420, north of the districts of Uehara and Tomigaya, and west of Meiji Shrine.

This larger definition of Yoyogi is generally used by residents and government to deliver services such as police, fire, and postal delivery.

== Characteristics ==
Yoyogi is composed of ten districts.

- Yoyogi 1-chōme (代々木一丁目, -itchōme): Home of the juku chain Yoyogi Seminar as well as other college preparatory schools and technical institutions. There are also several businesses catering to those who use Yoyogi Station.
- Yoyogi 2-chōme (代々木二丁目, -nichōme): The Nishi-Shinjuku skyscraper district is directly north of this area. There are numerous offices and shops due to the proximity to the south exit of Shinjuku Station.
- Yoyogi 3-chōme (代々木三丁目, -sanchōme): This area was once called Yamaya-chō (山谷町) and is mainly composed of small apartment buildings and houses.
- Yoyogi 4-chōme (代々木四丁目, -yonchōme) and Yoyogi 5-chōme (代々木五丁目, -gochōme): Close to Meiji Shrine and Yoyogi Park, these districts are quiet residential areas with a varied topography.
- Yoyogi Kamizono-chō (代々木神園町): This district covers Meiji Shrine and Yoyogi Park; as a result, there are few actual residents.
- Moto-Yoyogi-chō (元代々木町): Close to Yoyogi-Hachiman and Yoyogi-Uehara stations as well as Yamate-dōri, this district is a hilly residential area.
- Uehara (上原), Nishihara (西原), Ōyamachō (大山町): These three districts together with Tomigaya are often referred to as "Yoyogi-Uehara".

== Yoyogi Park ==
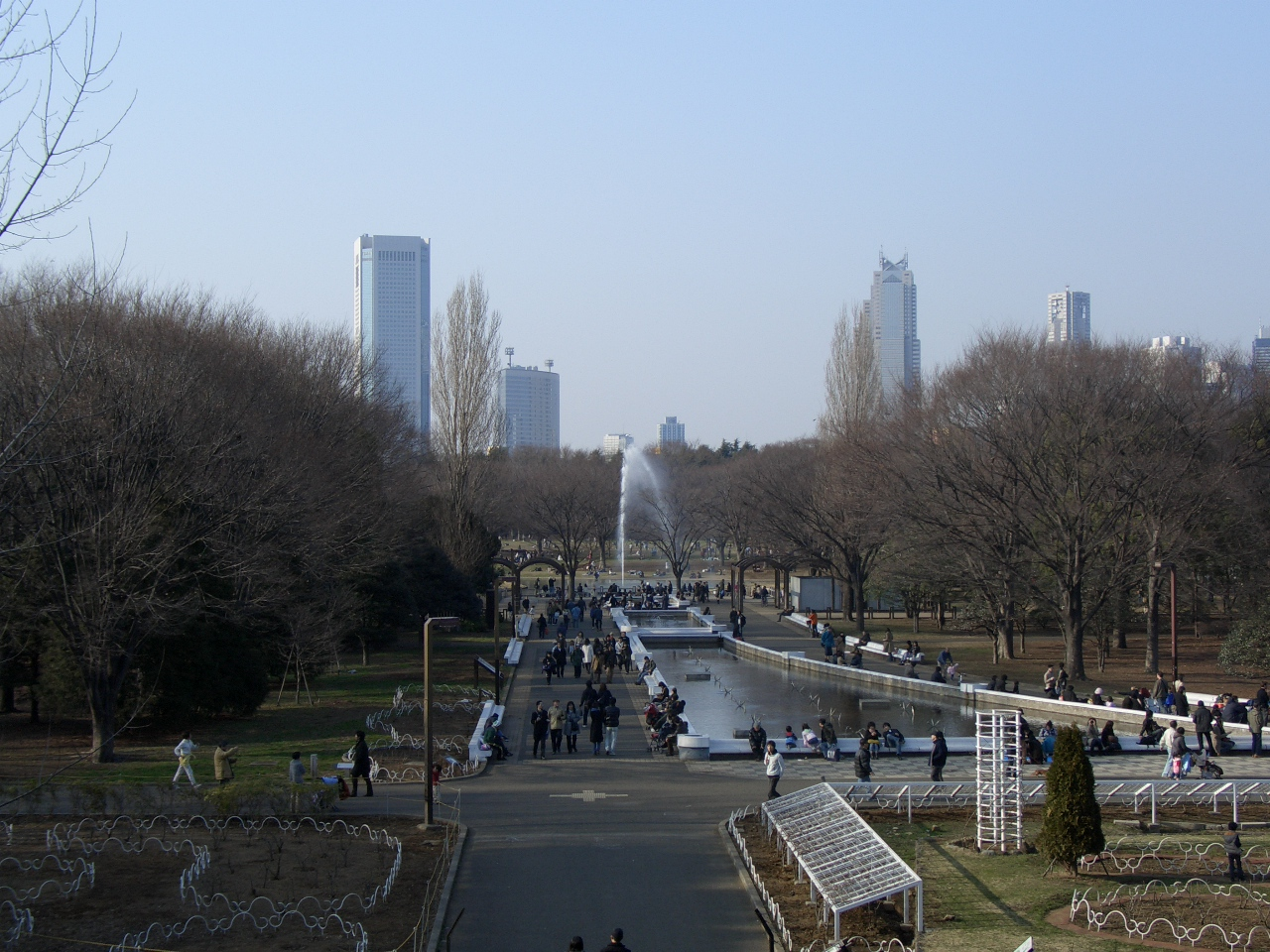
Yoyogi Park

Yoyogi Park is one of the largest parks in Tokyo, located in the centre of Shibuya directly south of Meiji Shrine. In the years preceding its designation as a public park, Yoyogi Park's site was used as the location of the first successful powered aircraft flight in Japan, an army parade ground, a post-World War II US military installation, and the location for the opening ceremonies of the 1964 Summer Olympics.

== Transportation ==
=== Rail ===
Yoyogi Station (代々木駅, -eki) is located in the easternmost part of Yoyogi only 700 meters south of Shinjuku Station. JR Yoyogi Station has two platforms for the Chūō-Sōbu and Yamanote lines. Platforms for the Toei Ōedo Line subway line are located underneath Tokyo Metropolitan Route 414 west of the JR station. Shinjuku Station (新宿駅, -eki) and Harajuku Station (原宿駅, -eki) also extend into or are located adjacent to Yoyogi.

Rail lines include:

- Yamanote Line, Chūō-Sōbu Line: Yoyogi Station
- Toei Ōedo Line: Yoyogi Station
- Odakyū Odawara Line: Minami-Shinjuku Station, Sangūbashi Station, Yoyogi-Hachiman Station, Yoyogi-Uehara Station
- Chiyoda Line: Yoyogi-Kōen Station, Yoyogi-Uehara Station
- Keiō Line: Hatsudai Station

=== Roads ===
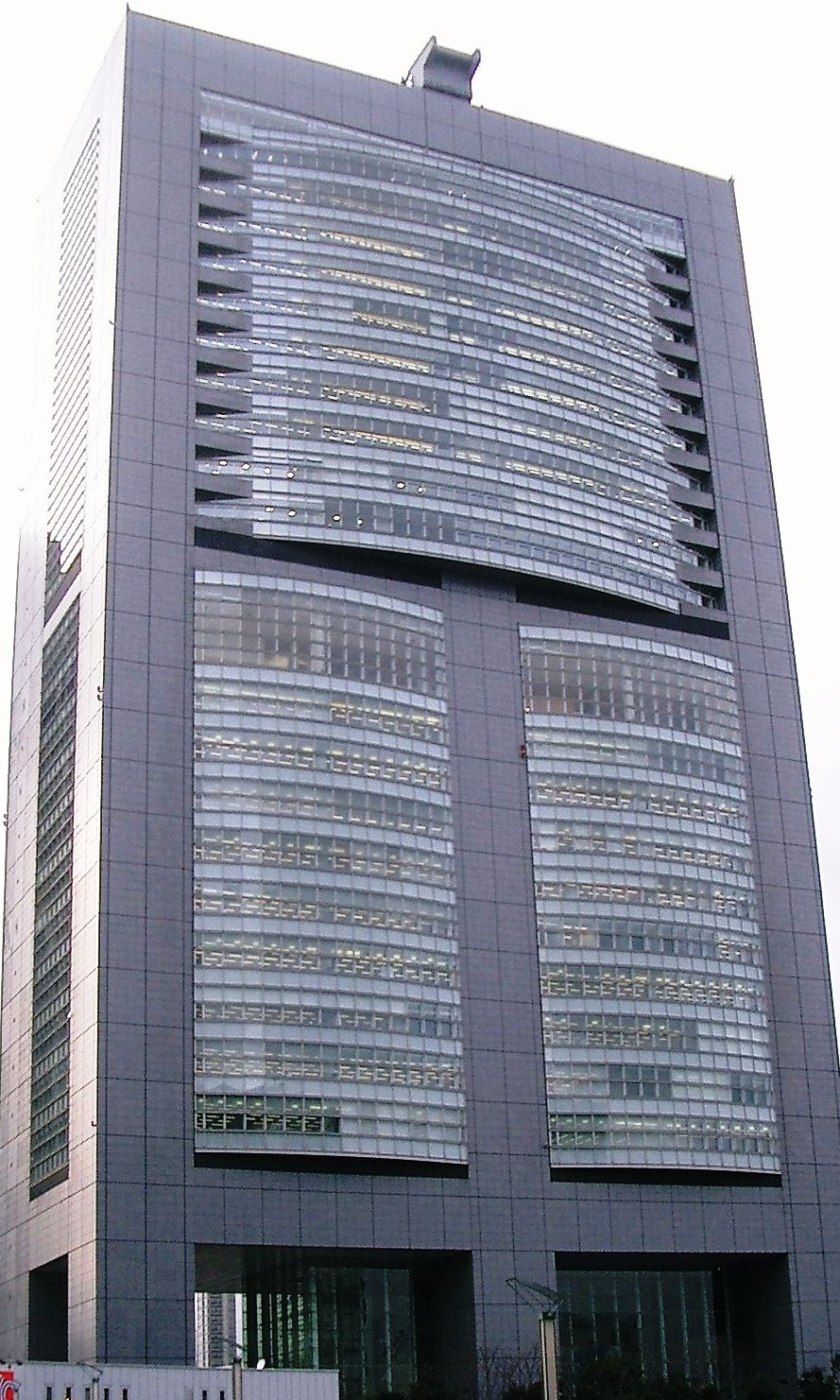
East Japan Railway Company headquarters

- National Route 20 (Kōshū-kaidō (甲州街道))
- Nishi-sandō (西参道)
- Yoyogi-yamaya-dōri (代々木山谷通り)
- Tokyo Metropolitan Route 413 (Inokashira-dōri (井ノ頭通り))
- Tokyo Metropolitan Route 317 (Yamate-dōri (山手通り))
- Shuto Expressway Route 4 - Shinjuku Route (首都高4号新宿線)

== Economy ==
East Japan Railway Company has its headquarters in Yoyogi. Square Enix and subsidiary Taito share the Shinjuku Bunka Quint Building in Yoyogi. Square Enix is no longer headquartered here, but at the Higashi-Shinjuku Station.

== Education ==
Shibuya Board of Education operates public elementary and junior high schools.

Much of Yoyogi is zoned to Yoyogi Sanya Elementary School (代々木山谷小学校). This includes 1-3 chōme, 4-chōme 1-31, 34, 35, 40, and 47-50 ban, and 5-chōme 42, 48, 54-60 ban. However, 4-chōme 32, 33, 36-39, 41-46, and 51-62 ban, and 5-chōme 13-36, 43-47, and 49-53 ban are instead zoned to Hatashiro Elementary School (幡代小学校). 5-chōme 1-12, 37-41, and 61-67-ban are zoned to Tomigaya Elementary School (渋谷区立富谷小学校).

Yoyogi 4-chōme, 1-chōme 5-11 ban, 3-chōme 1-17 and 21-59 ban, and 5-chōme 13-26 and 42-60 ban are zoned to Yoyogi Junior High School (代々木中学校). Yoyogi 2-chōme, 1-chōme 1-4 and 12-61 ban, and 3-chōme 18-20 ban are zoned to Harajuku Gaien Junior High School (原宿外苑中学校). Yoyogi 5-chome 1-12, 37-41, and 61-67 ban are zoned to Uehara Junior High School (渋谷区立上原中学校).
