= Kamiyamachō, Shibuya =

District located in Shibuya-ku, Tokyo

Kamiyamachō 神山町
- Residential district
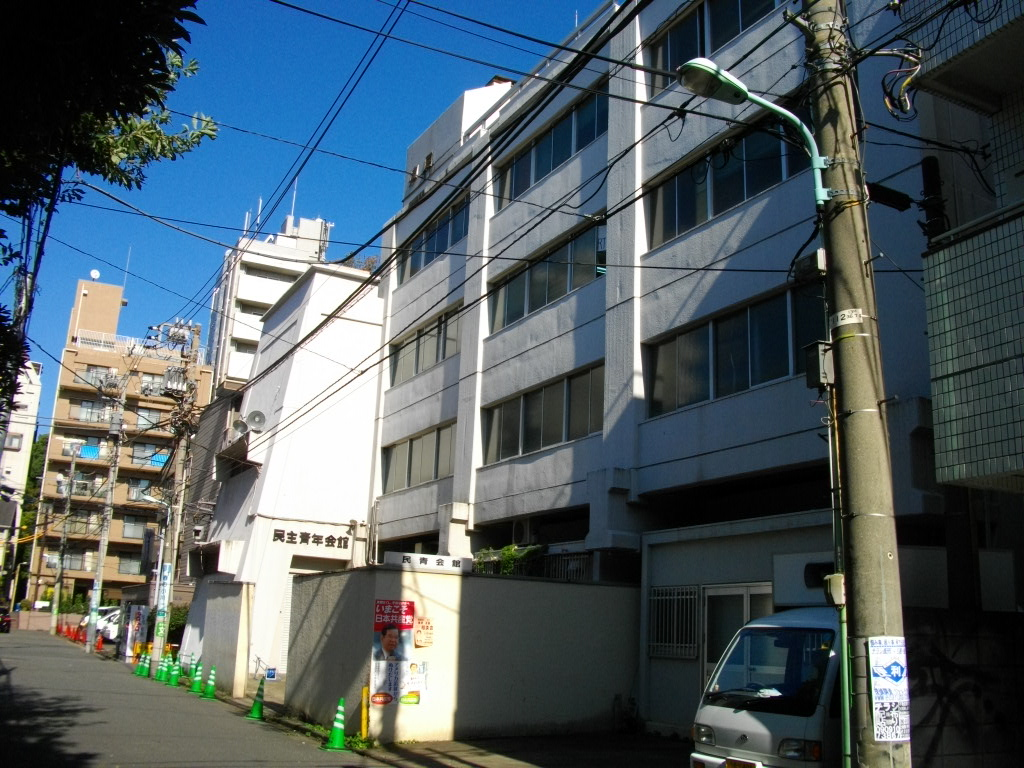
- Former Minsei (Democratic Youth League of Japan) Hall (now demolished)

- Location in Japan
- Coordinates: 35.6653°N 139.6931°E
- Country: Japan
- Region: Tokyo
- District: Shibuya

Population (1 October 2020)
  - Total: 2,872
- Time zone: UTC+09:00 (JST)
- Postal code(s): 150-0047

Kamiyama-chō (神山町) is a residential district of southwestern Shibuya, Tokyo, Japan. As of 1 October 2020, it has a population of 2,872 people. Its postal code is 150-0047.

Its nearest stations are Yoyogi-Hachiman, Yoyogi Kōen, Shinsen, Shibuya and Harajuku.

Famous residents include former Japanese prime ministers Shigeru Yoshida and Tarō Asō.

The embassies of Iraq, Jordan, Latvia, Mongolia and New Zealand are in Kamiyama-chō.

== Education ==
Shibuya Board of Education operates public elementary and junior high schools.

Kamiyamacho 4-42 ban are zoned to Jinnan Elementary School (神南小学校) and Shoto Junior High School (松濤中学校), while Kamiyamacho 1-3 and 43-ban are zoned to Tomigaya Elementary School (富谷小学校) and Uehara Junior High School (上原中学校).
