= Minami-Shinjuku Station =

Railway station in Tokyo, Japan

Coordinates: 35.6834°N 139.6985°E

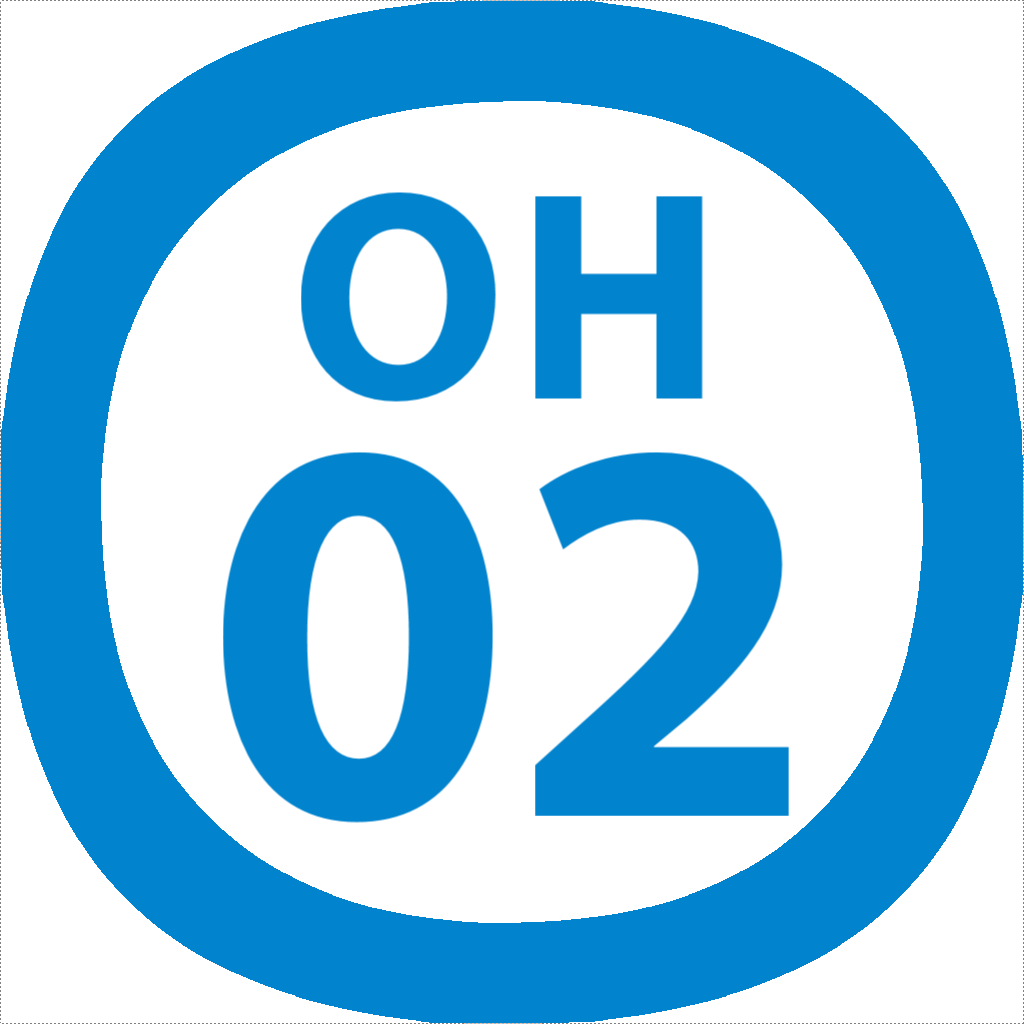
Minami-Shinjuku Station 南新宿駅

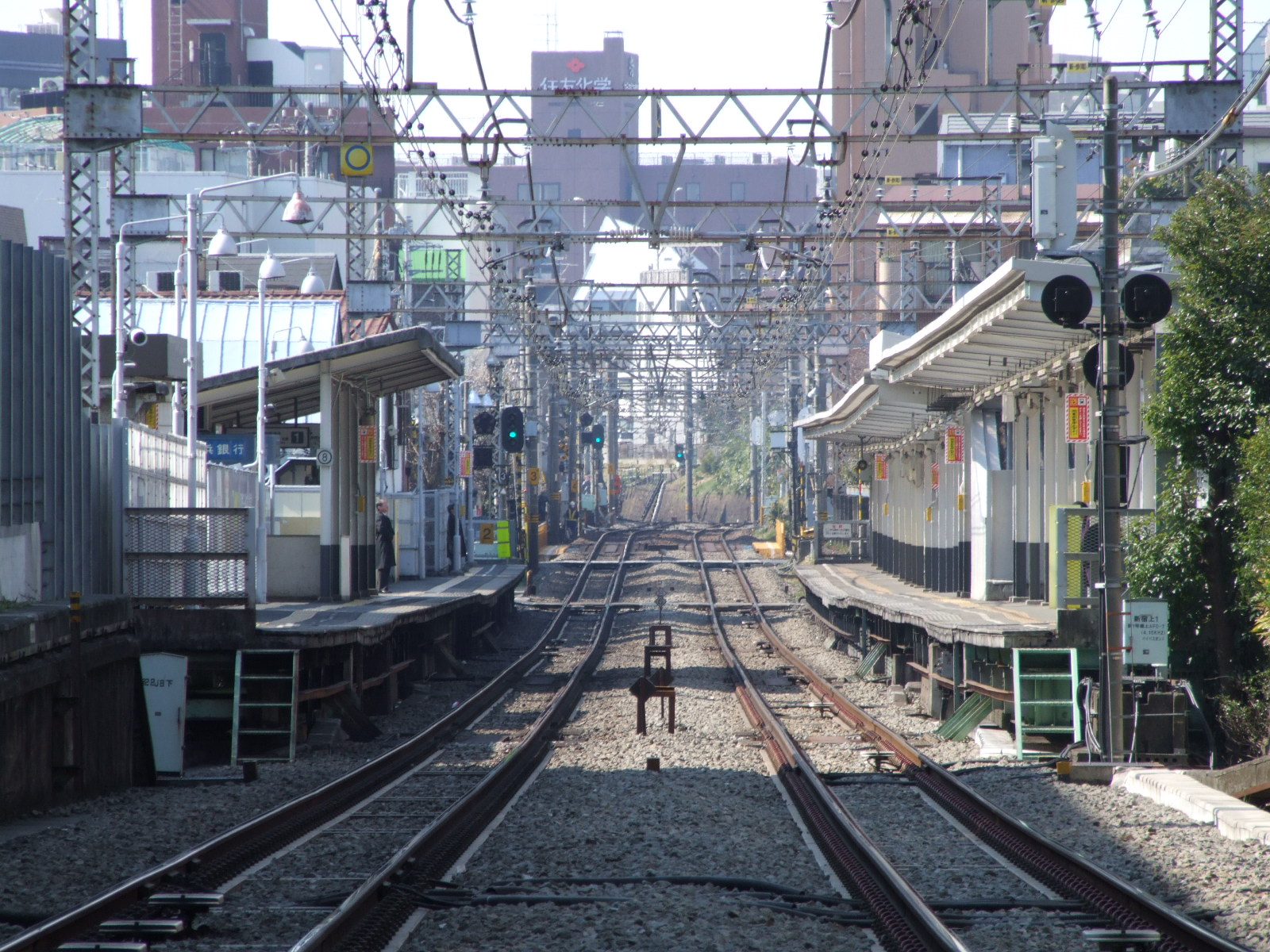
- Minami-Shinjuku station, March 2008

General information
- Location: 2-29-16 Yoyogi, Shibuya, Tokyo; Japan
- Operator: Odakyu Electric Railway
- Line: Odakyu Odawara Line
- Platforms: 2 side platforms
- Tracks: 2

Construction
- Structure type: Ground level
- Accessible: Yes

History
- Opened: 1 April 1927; 99 years ago
- Former names: Sendagaya-Shinden; Odakyu-Honsha-mae (until 1 May 1942)

Passengers
- FY2023: 3,875 daily

Services
Preceding station	Odakyu	Following station
Sangūbashi towards Odawara	Odawara Line Local	Shinjuku Terminus
Location

Minami-Shinjuku Station (南新宿駅, Minami-Shinkuju-eki) is a railway station on the Odakyu Odawara Line in Shibuya-ku, Tokyo, Japan, operated by the private railway operator Odakyu Electric Railway.

== Station layout ==
The station has two side platforms serving two tracks.

=== Platforms ===
1	Odakyū Odawara Line	for Machida, Hon-Atsugi and Odawara; Hakone-Tozan Railway for Hakone-Yumoto; Odakyu Enoshima Line for Fujisawa and Katase-Enoshima
2	Odakyu Odawara Line	for Shinjuku

== History ==
The station first opened on 1 April 1927 as Sendagaya-Shinden Station (千駄ヶ谷新田駅). On 1 July 1931, it was renamed Odakyu-Honsha-mae Station (小田急本社前駅), and on 1 May 1942, it became Minami-Shinjuku.

Station numbering was introduced to the Odakyu terminal in 2014 with Minami-Shinjuku being assigned station number OH02.

== Surrounding area ==
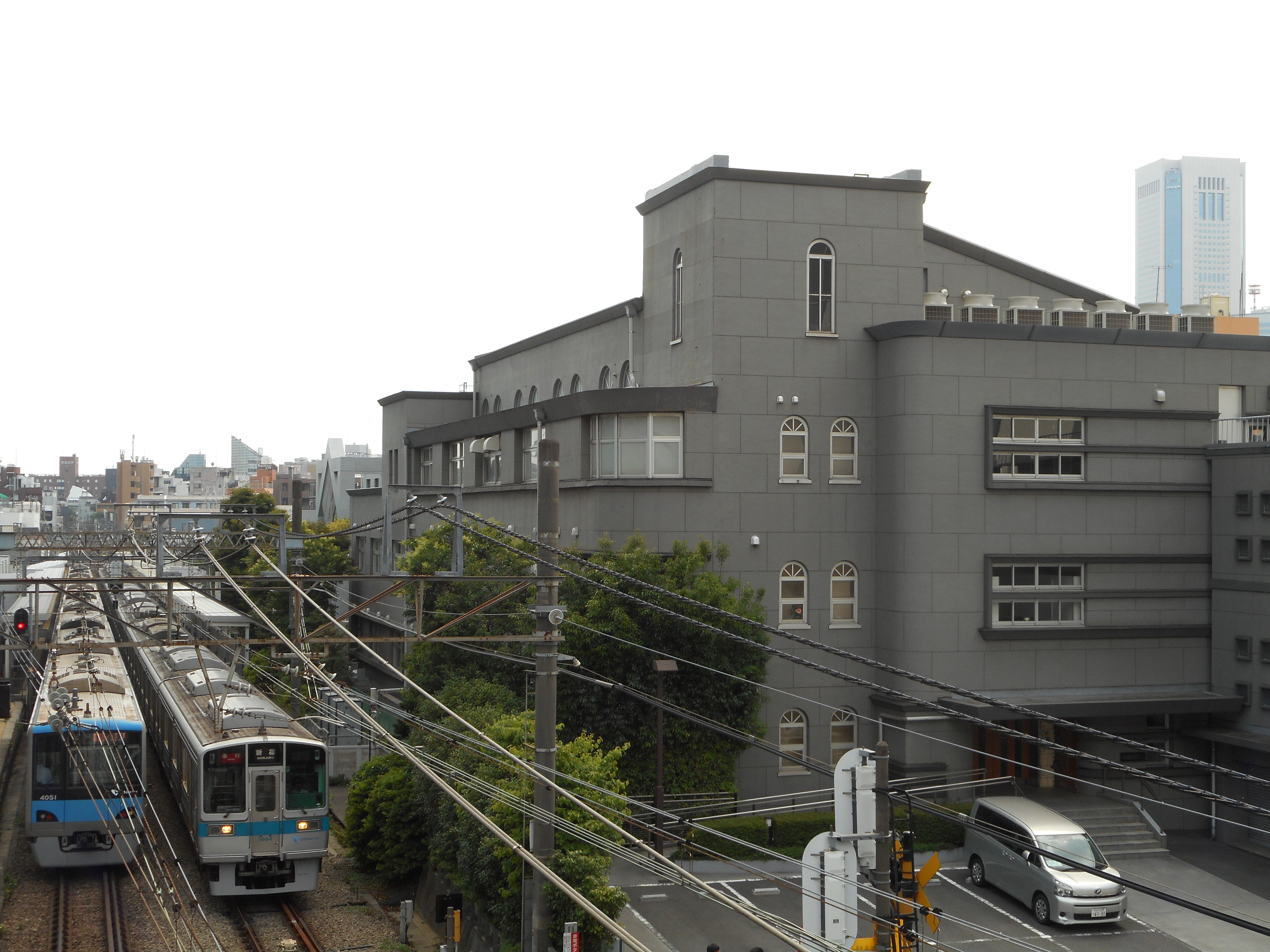
Odakyu Minami-Shinjuku Building (Former Odakyu Head Office Building, now used as registered office)

- Odakyu Minami-Shinjuku Building (Former Odakyu Head Office Building, now used as registered office)
- Odakyu Southern tower
- Yoyogi Station (Yamanote Line, Chūō-Sōbu Line, Toei Oedo Line)
- Shinjuku Station
