= Sangūbashi Station =

Railway station in Tokyo, Japan

Coordinates: 35.6787°N 139.6936°E

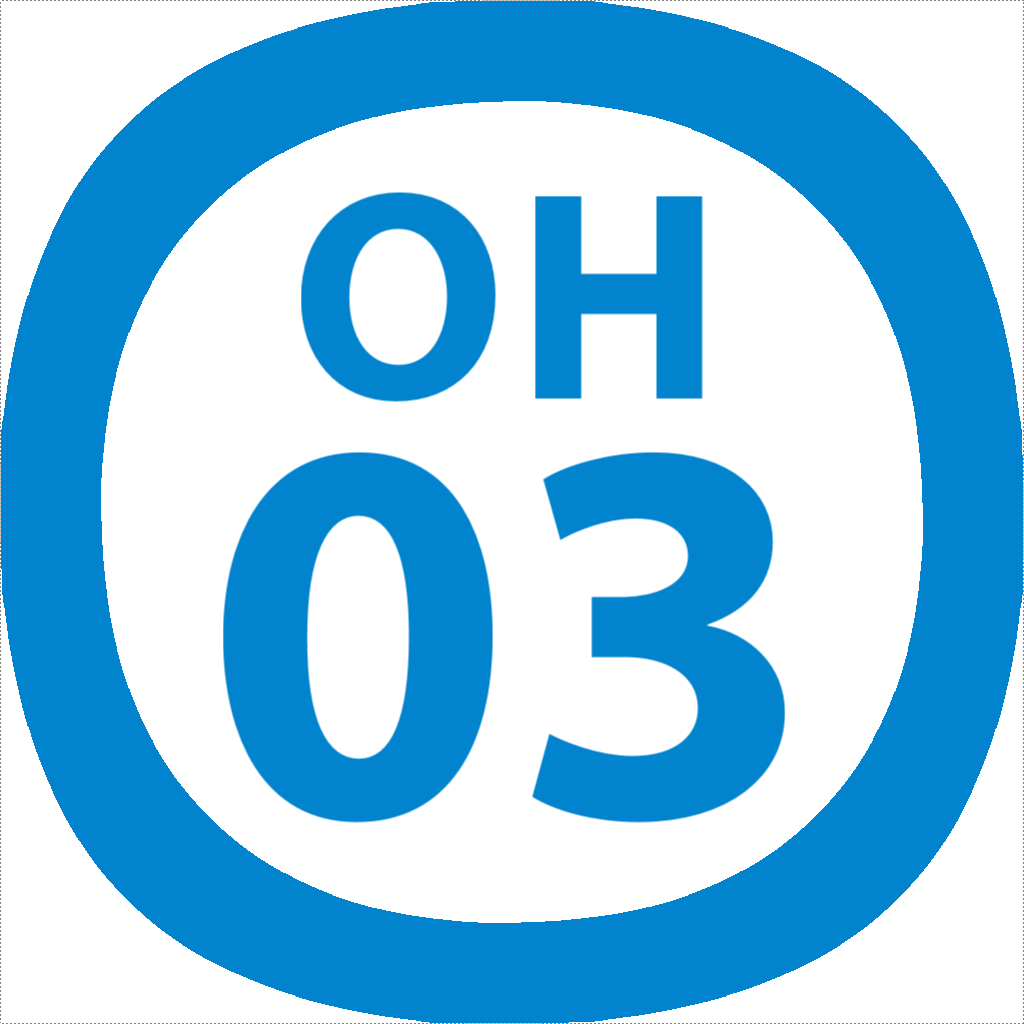
Sangūbashi 参宮橋

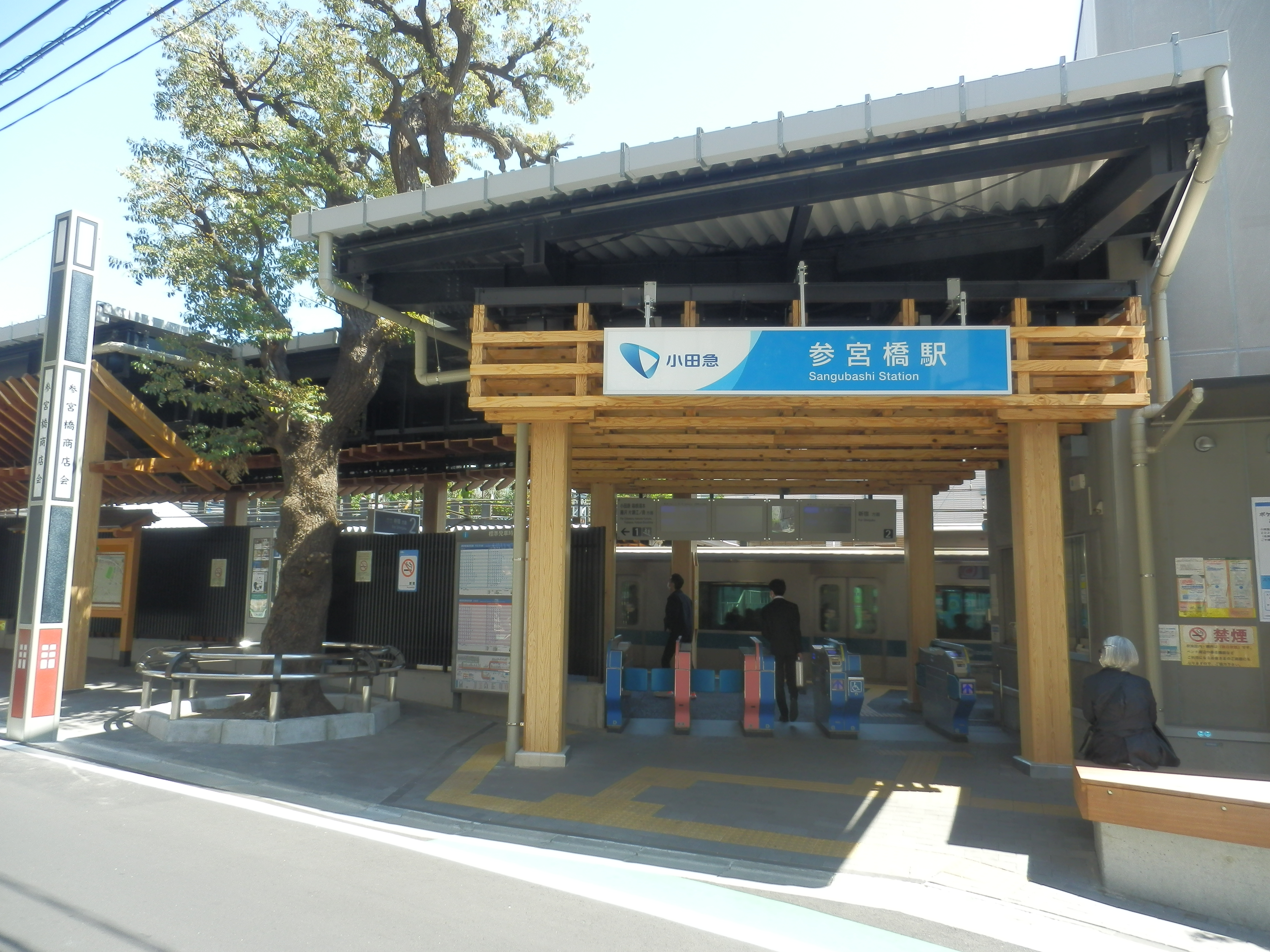
- Entrance

General information
- Location: Shibuya, Tokyo; Japan
- Operator: Odakyu Electric Railway
- Line: Odakyu Odawara Line
- Tracks: 2

Construction
- Structure type: Ground level
- Accessible: No

History
- Opened: 1 April 1927; 99 years ago
- Rebuilt: 2018-2020

Passengers
- FY2023: 12,634 daily ▲16.4%
- Rank: 58 out of 70

Services
Preceding station	Odakyu	Following station
Yoyogi-Hachiman towards Odawara	Odawara Line Local	Minami-Shinjuku towards Shinjuku
Location

Sangūbashi Station (参宮橋駅, Sangūbashi-eki) is a railway station on the Odakyu Odawara Line in Shibuya, Tokyo, Japan, operated by the private railway operator Odakyu Electric Railway.

== Station layout ==
The station has two side platforms serving two tracks.

=== Platforms ===
1	Odakyū Odawara Line	for Machida, Hon-Atsugi and Odawara; Hakone-Tozan Railway for Hakone-Yumoto; Odakyu Enoshima Line for Fujisawa and Katase-Enoshima
2	Odakyu Odawara Line	for Shinjuku

== History ==
Sangubashi Station opened on 1 April 1927.

Station numbering was introduced to the Odakyu terminal in 2014 with Shinjuku being assigned station number OH03.

Renovation works to the east exit started in November 2018 and were completed in November 2020. The updated station building was constructed using wood from western Tokyo; the design elements, in particular its use of Shinto-inspired architecture, reflect its proximity to the Meiji Shrine.

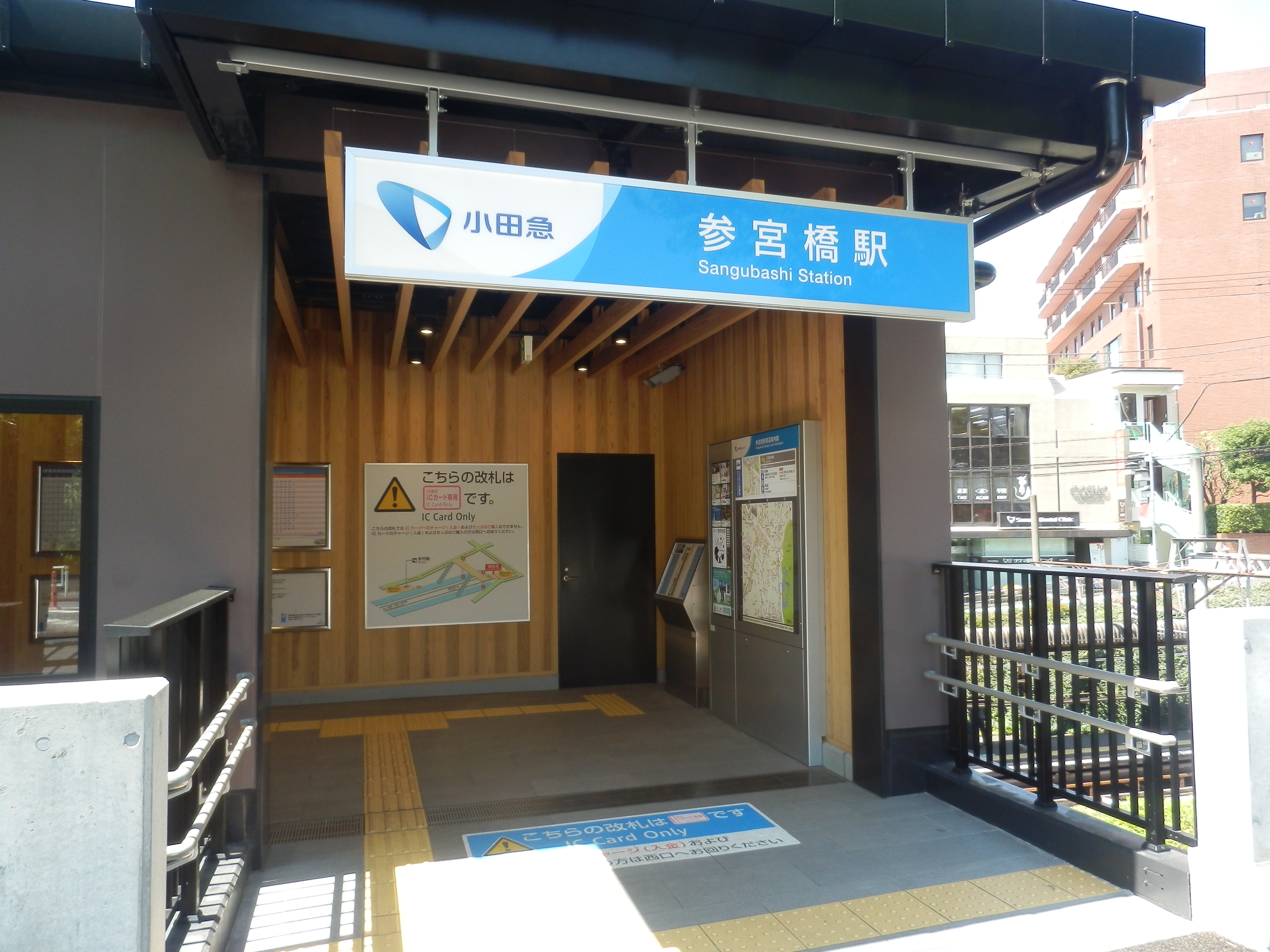
Upgraded east exit

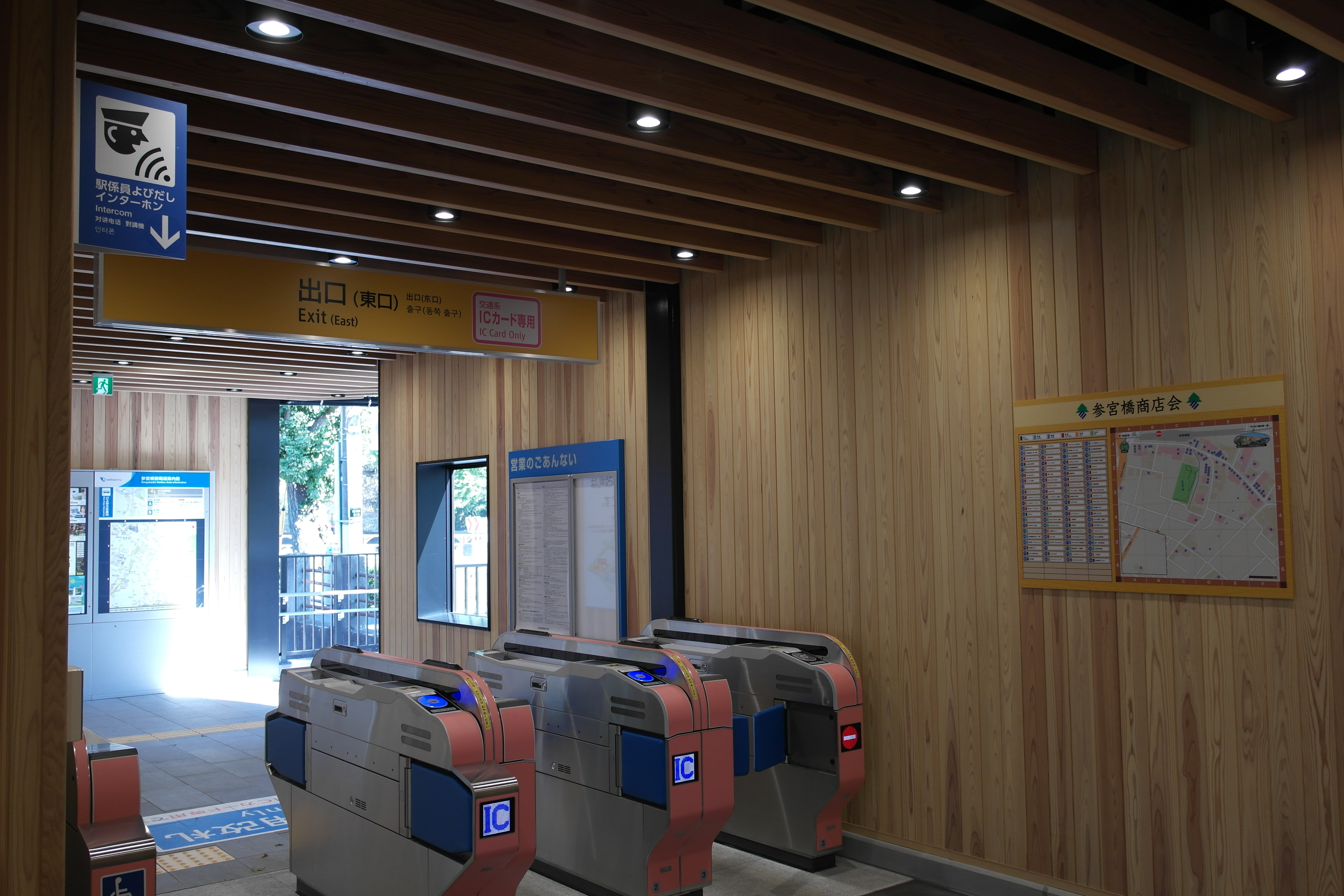
Inside the east exit

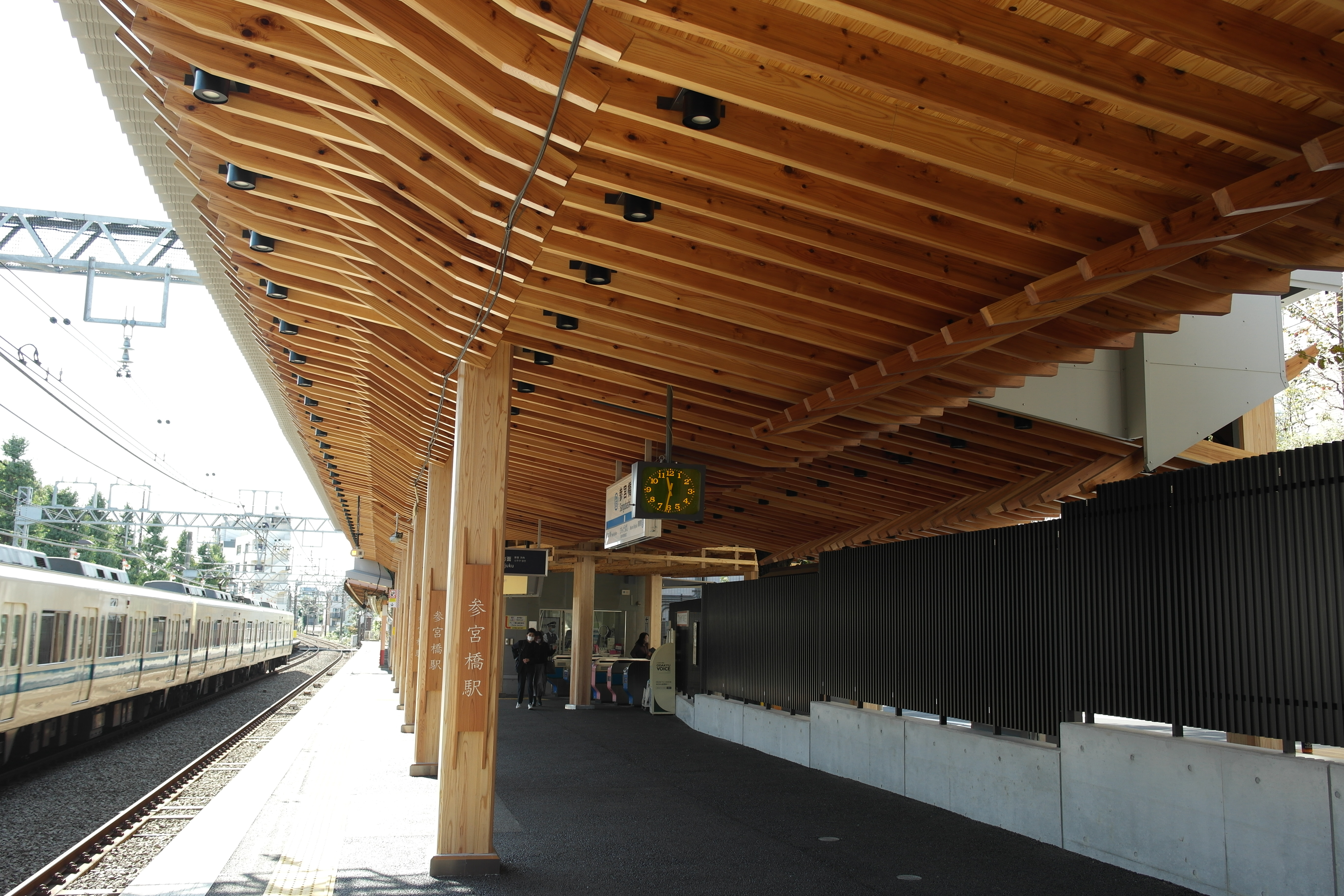
Wood station roof as seen in October 2020

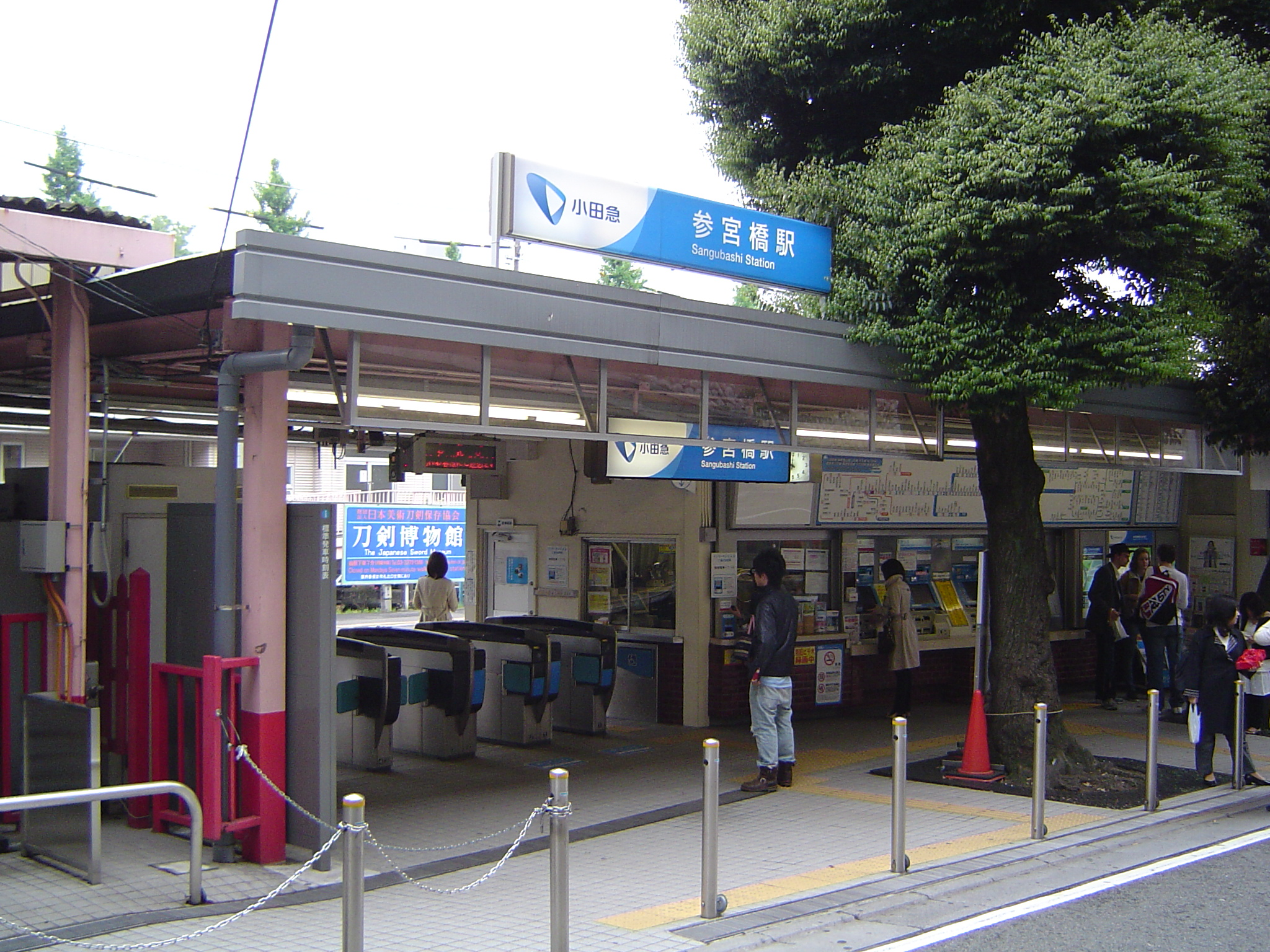
Old exit before renovation work

== In popular culture ==
In the manga Our Precious Conversations, the train station where the two protagonists have their first chats is based on Sangūbashi Station.

The Railway Crossings nearby the station has been featured on the 2007 film 5 Centimeters Per Second.

== Surrounding area ==
- Meiji Shrine
- Yoyogi Park
