= Yoyogi-Uehara Station =

Railway and metro station in Tokyo, Japan

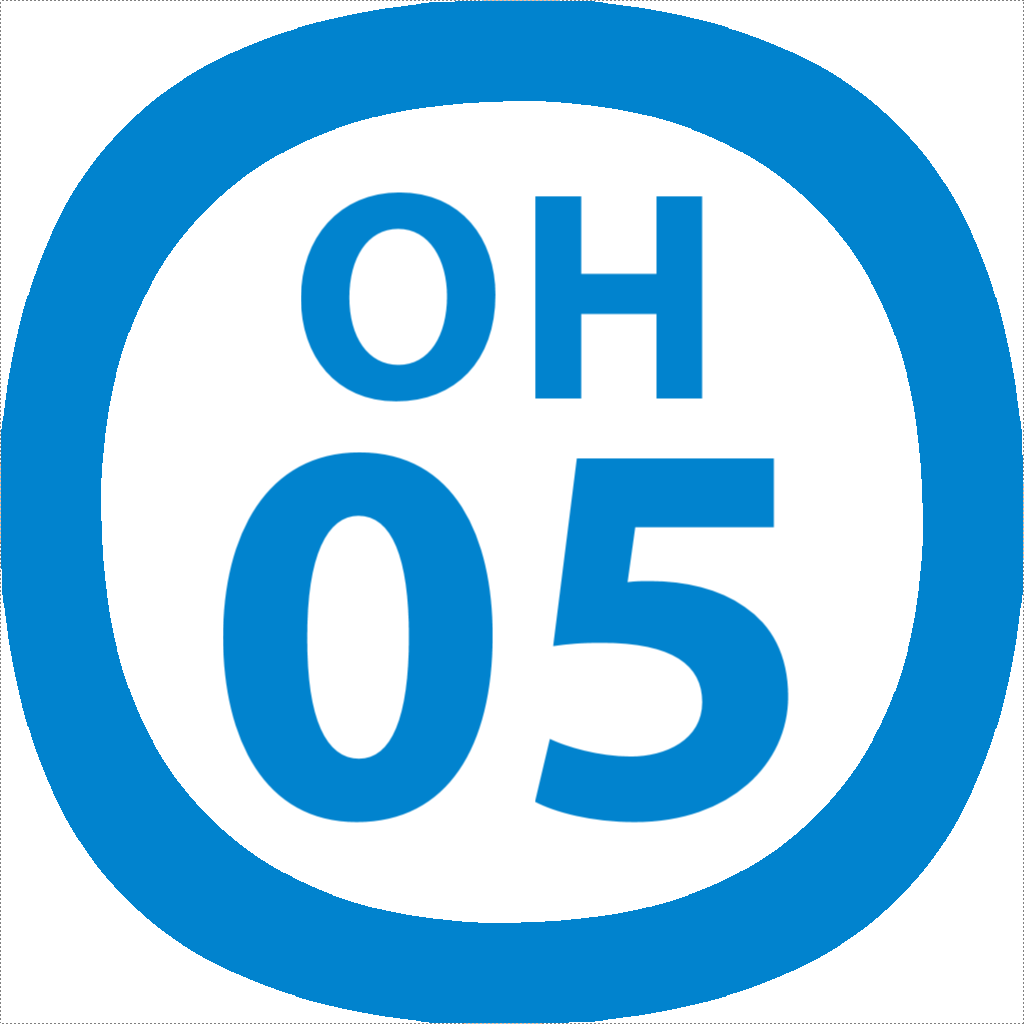
Yoyogi-Uehara Station 代々木上原駅

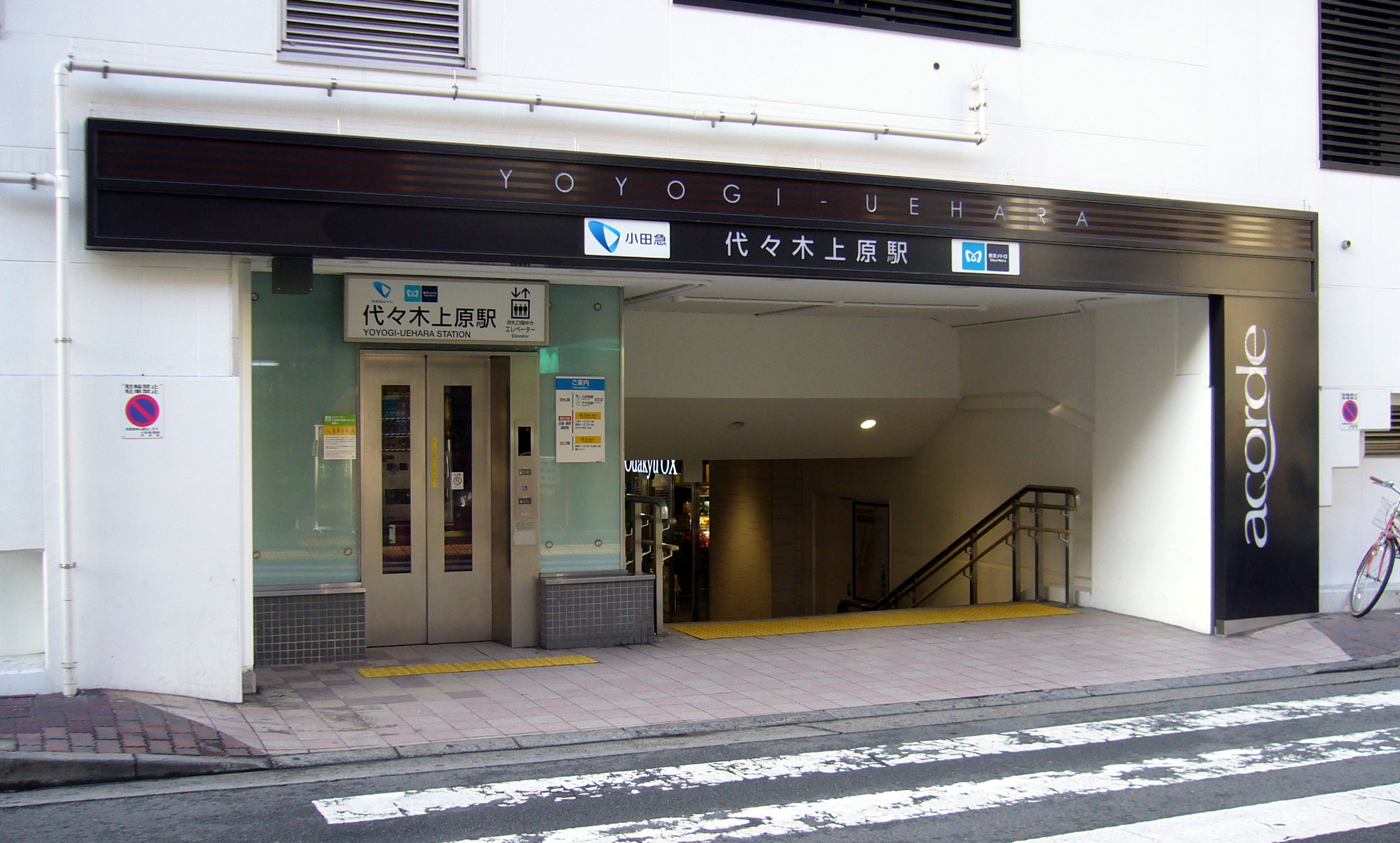
- South entrance

General information
- Location: 3-8-5 Nishihara, Shibuya City, Tokyo; Japan
- Coordinates: 35°40′8.63″N 139°40′46.84″E
- Operator: Odakyu Electric Railway (manager); Tokyo Metro
- Lines: Odakyu Odawara Line; Chiyoda Line
- Platforms: 2 island platforms
- Tracks: 4
- Connections: Bus stop

Construction
- Structure type: Elevated
- Accessible: Yes

Other information
- Station code: C-01 (Tokyo Metro); OH-05 (Odakyu)

History
- Opened: 1 April 1927; 99 years ago

Passengers
- FY2023: 257,017 daily (Odakyu); 267,748 daily (Tokyo Metro)
- Rank: 2 out of 70 (Odakyu)

Services
Preceding station	Odakyu	Following station
Shimo-Kitazawa towards Odawara	Odawara Line Rapid Express	Shinjuku Terminus
Shimo-Kitazawa One-way operation	Odawara Line Commuter Express	Shinjuku Terminus
Shimo-Kitazawa towards Odawara	Odawara Line Express	through to Chiyoda Line
Shimo-Kitazawa One-way operation	Odawara Line Express	Shinjuku Terminus
Shimo-Kitazawa towards Isehara	Odawara Line Commuter Semi Express	through to Chiyoda Line
Shimo-Kitazawa towards Hon-Atsugi	Odawara Line Semi Express	through to Chiyoda Line
Higashi-Kitazawa towards Odawara	Odawara Line Local	Yoyogi-Hachiman towards Shinjuku
Higashi-Kitazawa towards Odawara	Odawara Line Local	through to Chiyoda Line
Preceding station	Tokyo Metro	Following station
through to Odawara Line	Chiyoda Line	Yoyogi-koen towards Kita-Ayase
Location
- Location within Special wards of Tokyo Location within Tokyo Bay and Bōsō Peninsula Location within Tokyo Location within Japan

Yoyogi-Uehara Station (代々木上原駅, Yoyogi-Uehara-eki) is a railway station on the Odakyū Odawara Line and Tokyo Metro Chiyoda Line in Shibuya, Tokyo, Japan. The Tokyo Metro station number is C-01.

Both lines share platforms at this station, as each line has through operation onto the other.

== Station layout ==
1	Odawara Line	for Odawara, Hakone-Yumoto, Karakida, Katase-Enoshima
2	Odawara Line	for Karakida, Hon-Atsugi (through from the Chiyoda Line)
2	Chiyoda Line	Terminating trains
3	Chiyoda Line	for Omotesandō, Kasumigaseki, Ōtemachi, Ayase, and Kita-ayase; Joban Line (Local) for Matsudo, Kashiwa, Abiko and Toride (via Ayase)
4	Odawara Line	for Shinjuku

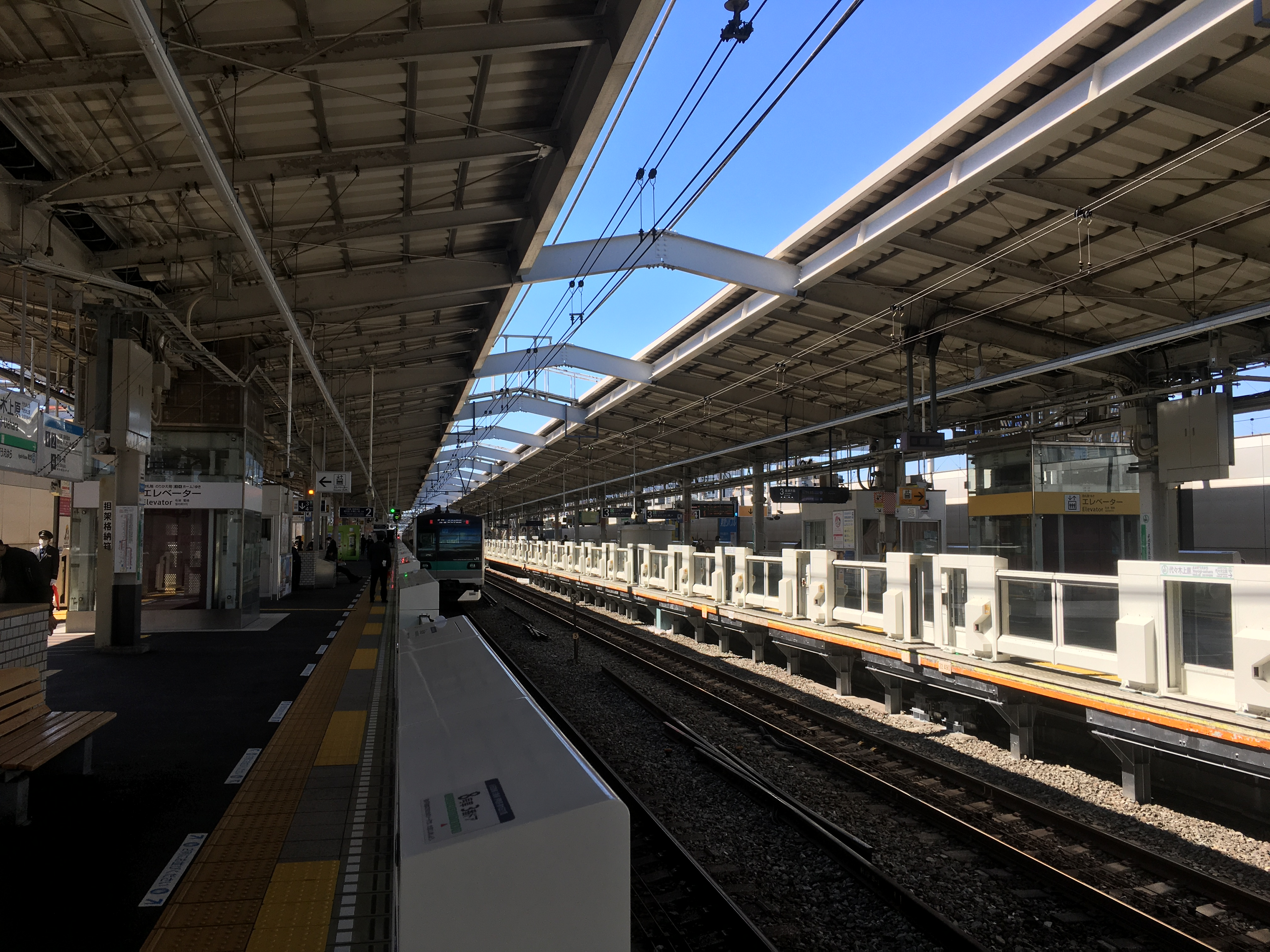
Platforms, 2020

== Services ==
Except for Romancecar limited express services, all Odakyu Odawara Line trains stop at Yoyogi-Uehara. From here trains either continue inbound on the Odawara Line to Shinjuku or the Chiyoda Line for Ayase; some trains from the Chiyoda Line terminate here, while others and all trains from Shinjuku continue along the Odawara Line.

== Surrounding area ==
Tokyo Metropolitan Route 413 ("Inokashira-dōri") intersects the Odawara Line just west of the station. There are several music-related institutions including Koga Masao Museum of Music and JASRAC headquarters located nearby as well as the Tokyo Camii mosque.

A nearby bus stop served by Keio Dentetsu Bus provides local transit in the immediate vicinity.

== History ==
The station was opened as a stop on the Odakyu Odawara Line on 1 April 1927.

Teito Rapid Transit Authority (TRTA) began service at the station on 31 March 1978.

Station numbering was introduced to the Odakyu Line in 2014 with Yoyogi-Uehara being assigned station number OH05.
