= Yoyogi-koen Station =

Metro station in Tokyo, Japan

Coordinates: 35°40′8.1984″N 139°41′28.7808″E

Yoyogi-koen Station 代々木公園駅

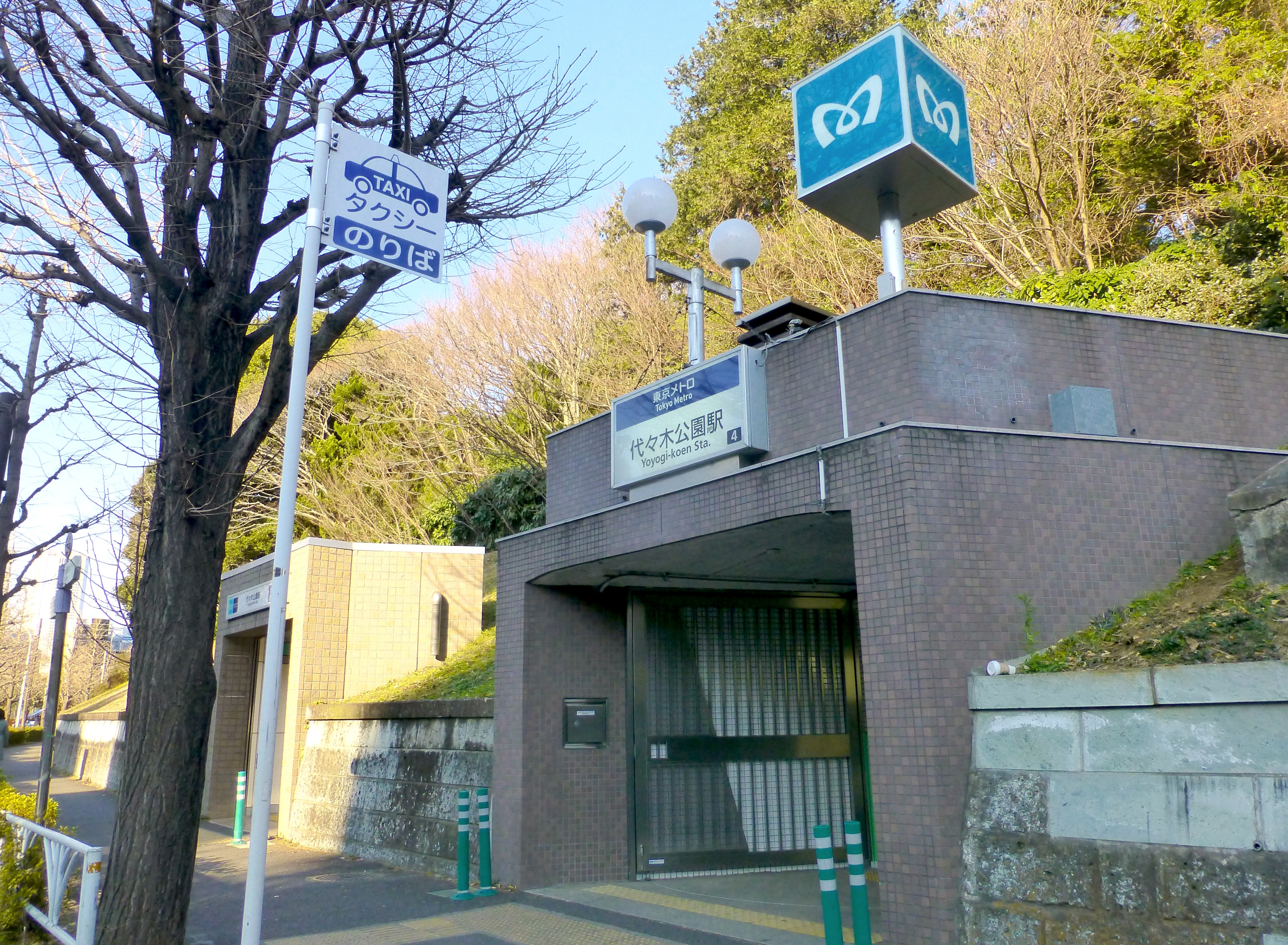
- Exit 4 in 2016

General information
- Location: 1-3-9 Tomigaya, Shibuya, Tokyo; Japan
- Operator: Tokyo Metro
- Line: Chiyoda Line
- Platforms: 1 island platform
- Tracks: 2

Construction
- Structure type: Underground

Other information
- Station code: C-02

History
- Opened: 20 October 1972; 53 years ago

Passengers
- 2021: 21,433 daily

Services
Preceding station	Tokyo Metro	Following station
Yoyogi-uehara towards Yoyogi-Uehara	Chiyoda Line	Meiji-jingumae towards Kita-Ayase
Location
- Location within Tokyo Yamanote Loop Location within Tokyo wards area Location within Japan

Yoyogi-koen Station (代々木公園駅, Yoyogi-kōen-eki) is a subway station on the Tokyo Metro Chiyoda Line in Shibuya, Tokyo, Japan, operated by the Tokyo subway operator Tokyo Metro. It is numbered "C-02".

== Station layout ==
The station is composed of a single island platform serving two tracks.

=== Platforms ===
1	Chiyoda Line	for Yoyogi-uehara; Odakyu Odawara Line for Hon-Atsugi and Isehara
2	Chiyoda Line	for Meiji-jingumae, Otemachi, Ayase, and Kita-ayase; Joban Line (Local) for Matsudo, Kashiwa and Toride (via Ayase)

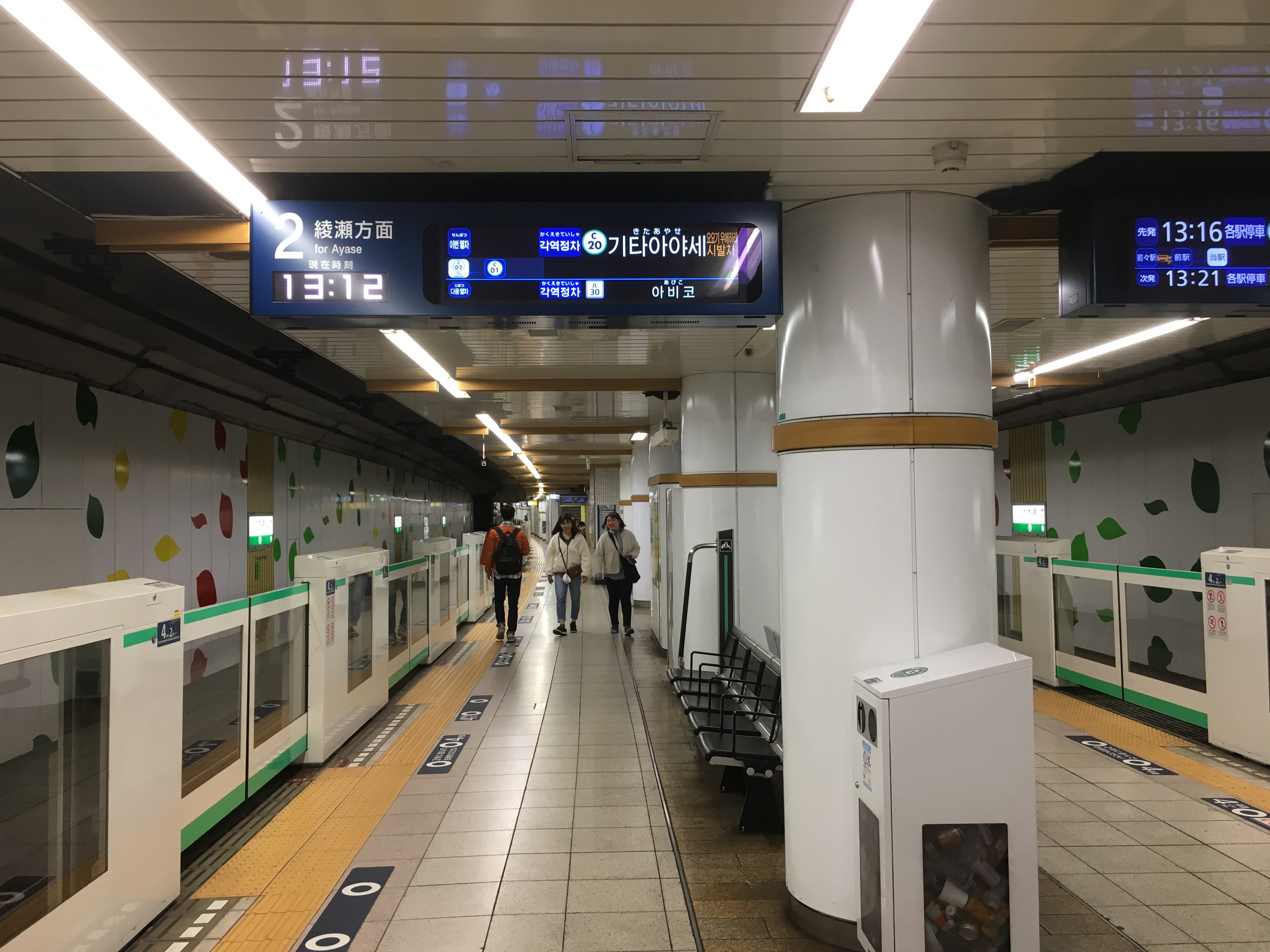
The platforms in November 2019

== History ==
The station was opened on October 20, 1972 by the Teito Rapid Transit Authority (TRTA).

The station facilities were inherited by Tokyo Metro after the privatization of the TRTA in 2004.

PASMO smart card coverage at this station began operation on 18 March 2007.

== Passenger statistics ==
In fiscal 2013, the station was the least used on the Chiyoda Line and the 117th-busiest on the Tokyo Metro network with an average of 23,581 passengers daily. The passenger statistics for previous years are as shown below.

Fiscal year	Daily average
2011	21,354
2012	22,345
2013	23,581

== Surrounding area ==
- Yoyogi Park
- Yoyogi-Hachiman Station (Odakyu Odawara Line)

== See also ==
- List of railway stations in Japan
