= Yoyogi Station =

Railway and metro station in Tokyo, Japan

Coordinates: 35.683828°N 139.702320°E

JY18 JB11 Yoyogi Station 代々木駅

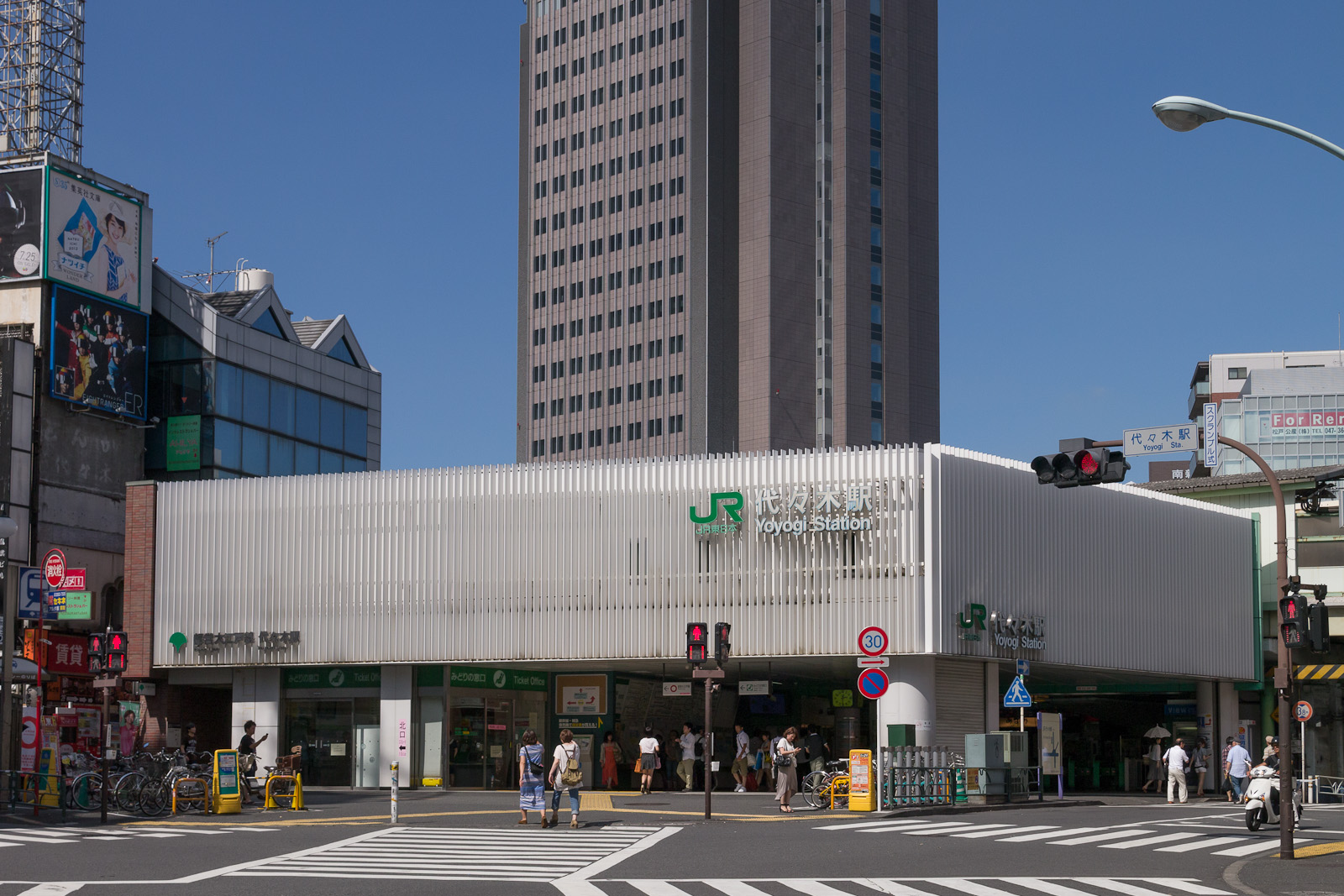
- The main (west) entrance in July 2012

General information
- Location: 1 Yoyogi, Shibuya-ku, Tokyo; Japan
- Operator: JR East; Toei Subway
- Lines: Yamanote Line; Chūō-Sōbu Line; Ōedo Line

Other information
- Station code: JY18 (Yamanote Line); JB11 (Chūō-Sōbu Line); E-26 (Toei Oedo Line)

History
- Opened: 23 October 1906; 120 years ago

Passengers
- FY2024: 113,164 daily; 23,738 daily

Services
Preceding station	JR East	Following station
Harajuku JY19 Next counter-clockwise	Yamanote Line	Shinjuku Next clockwise
Shinjuku towards Mitaka	Chūō–Sōbu Line	Sendagaya JB12 towards Chiba
Preceding station	Toei Subway	Following station
Shinjuku towards Hikarigaoka	Ōedo Line	Kokuritsu-kyogijo towards Tochōmae
Location
- Location within Tokyo Yamanote Loop Location within Tokyo wards area Location within Japan

Yoyogi Station (代々木駅, Yoyogi-eki) is a railway station in Shibuya, Tokyo, Japan, operated by the East Japan Railway Company (JR East) and the Tokyo Metropolitan Bureau of Transportation (Toei). It is station E-26 under Toei's numbering system.

== Station layout ==
=== JR East ===
The JR East station consists of two ground-level side platforms on either side of an island platform, serving four tracks in total.

1	Yamanote Line	for Shinjuku and Ikebukuro
2	Yamanote Line	for Shibuya and Shinagawa
3	Chūō-Sōbu Line	for Shinjuku, Nakano, and Mitaka
4	Chūō-Sōbu Line	for Ochanomizu, Akihabara, Funabashi, and Chiba

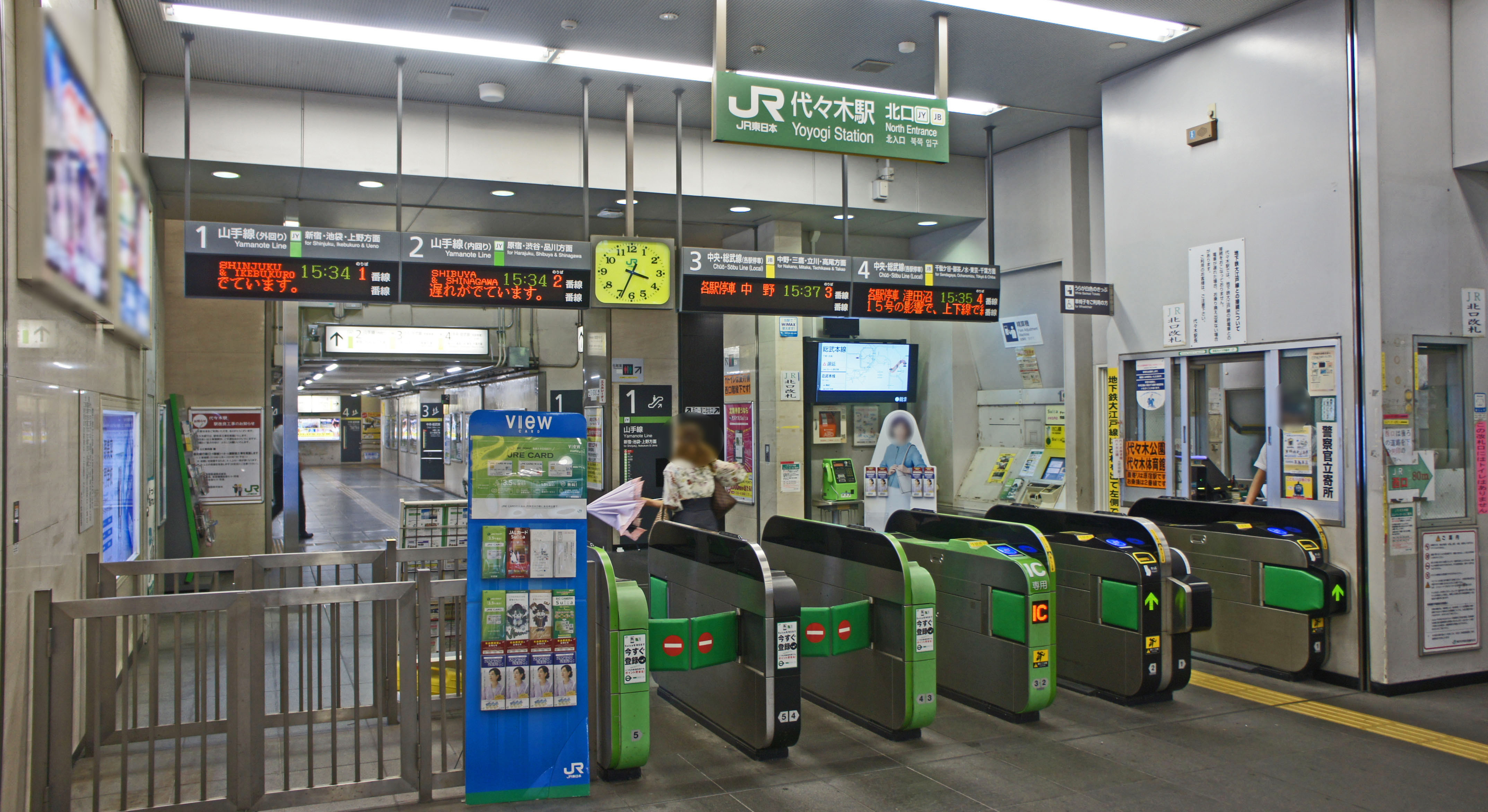
North gates

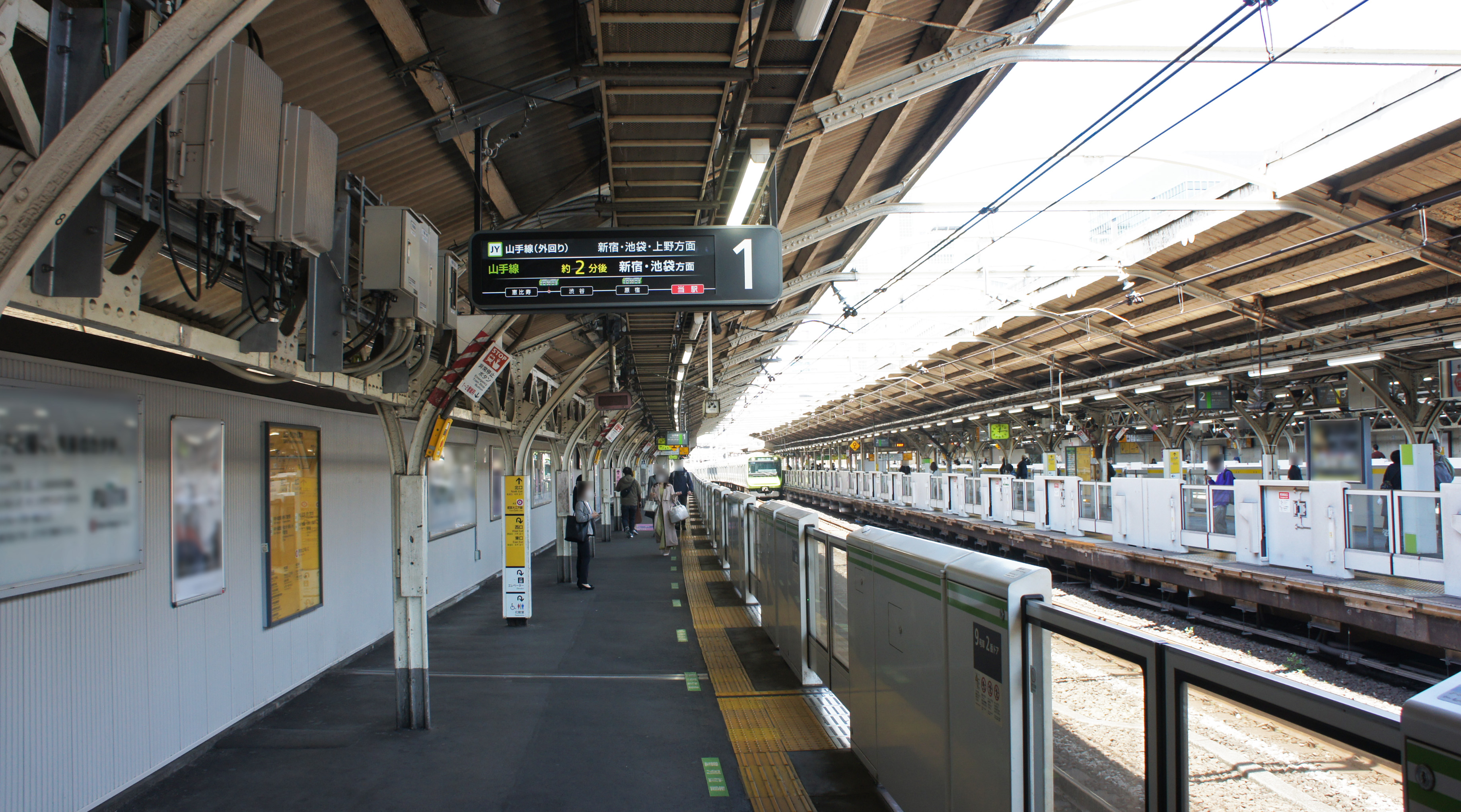
Platform 1

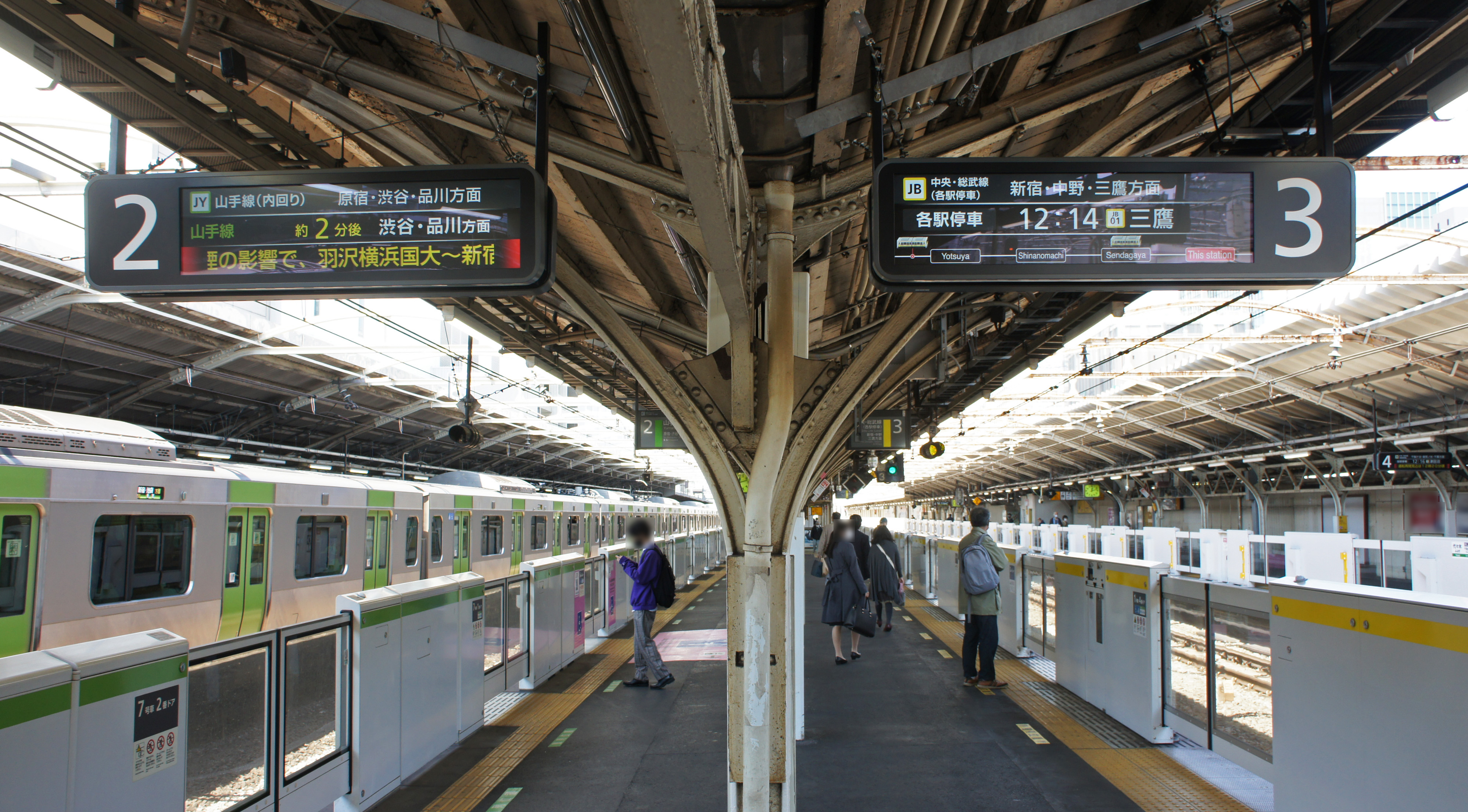
Platforms 2 and 3

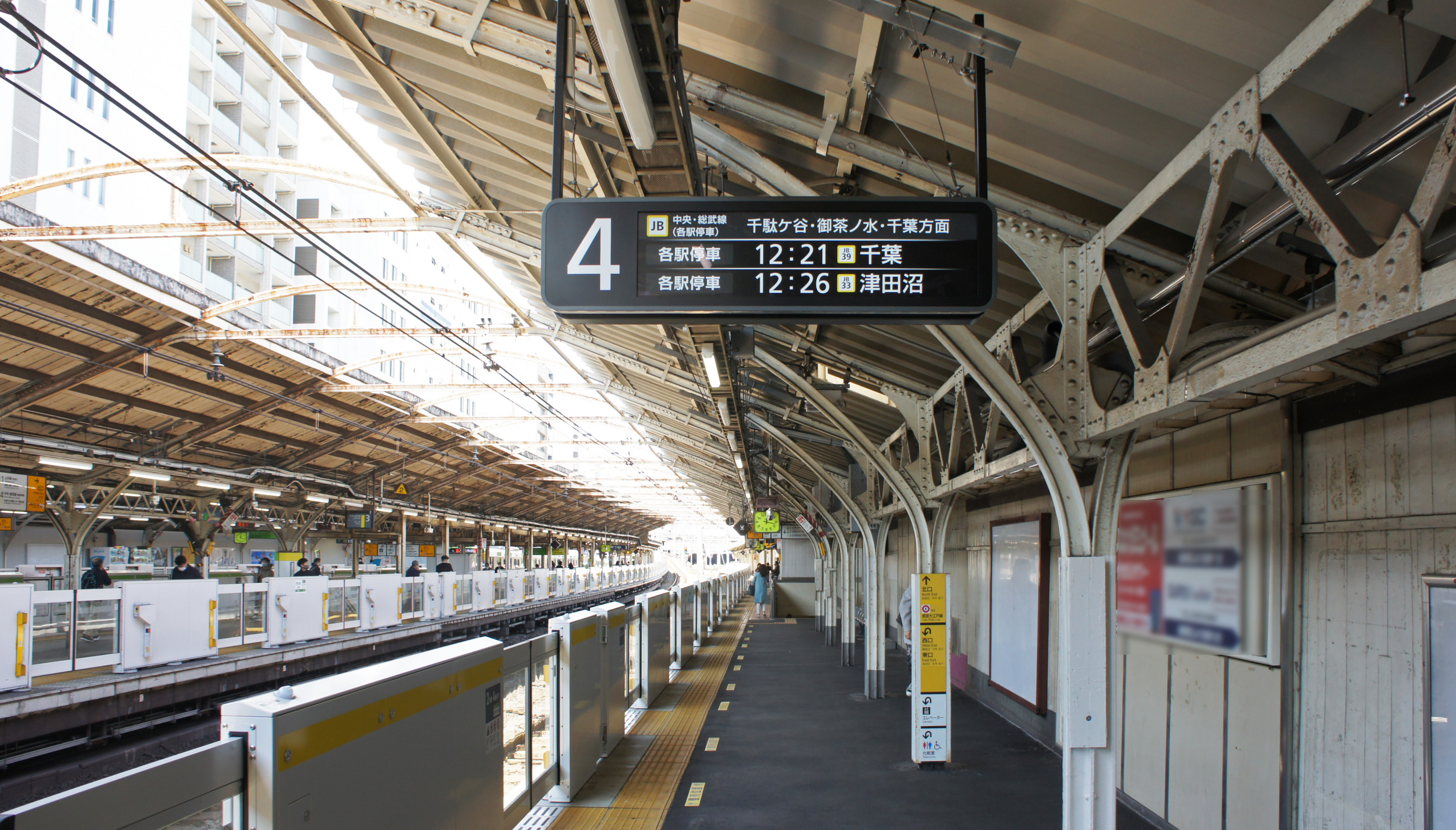
Platform 4

Track layout of Yoyogi and Shinjuku stations as of 2010

Chest-high platform edge doors were installed on the Yamanote Line platforms in September 2015, and brought into use from October.

There are three exits: East exit, West exit, and North exit. The latter two provide easy access to the Oedo line.

=== Toei ===
The Toei Oedo Line station has one underground island platform serving two tracks.

1	Ōedo Line	for Roppongi
2	Ōedo Line	for Hikarigaoka

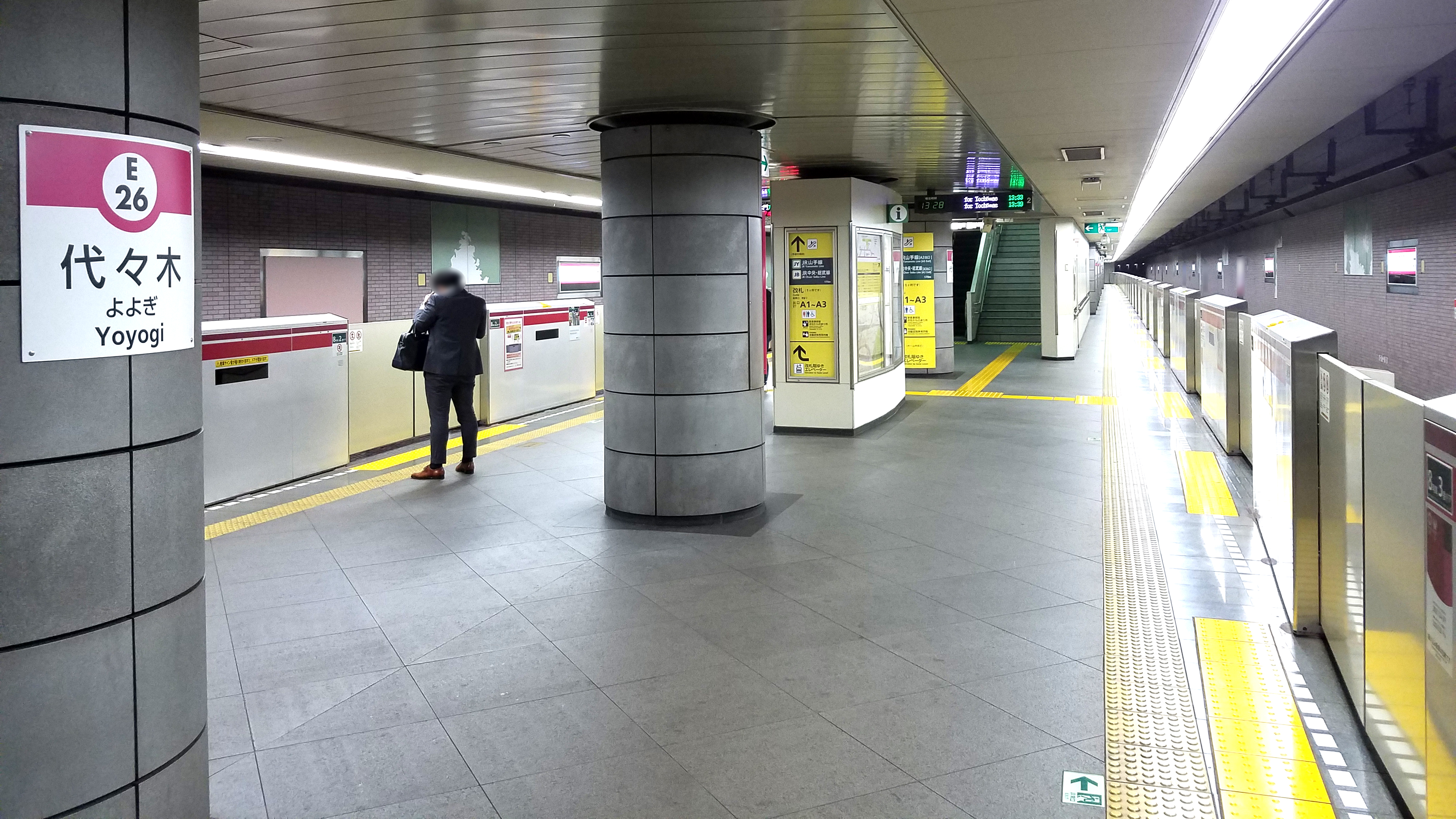
Toei platforms, December 2019

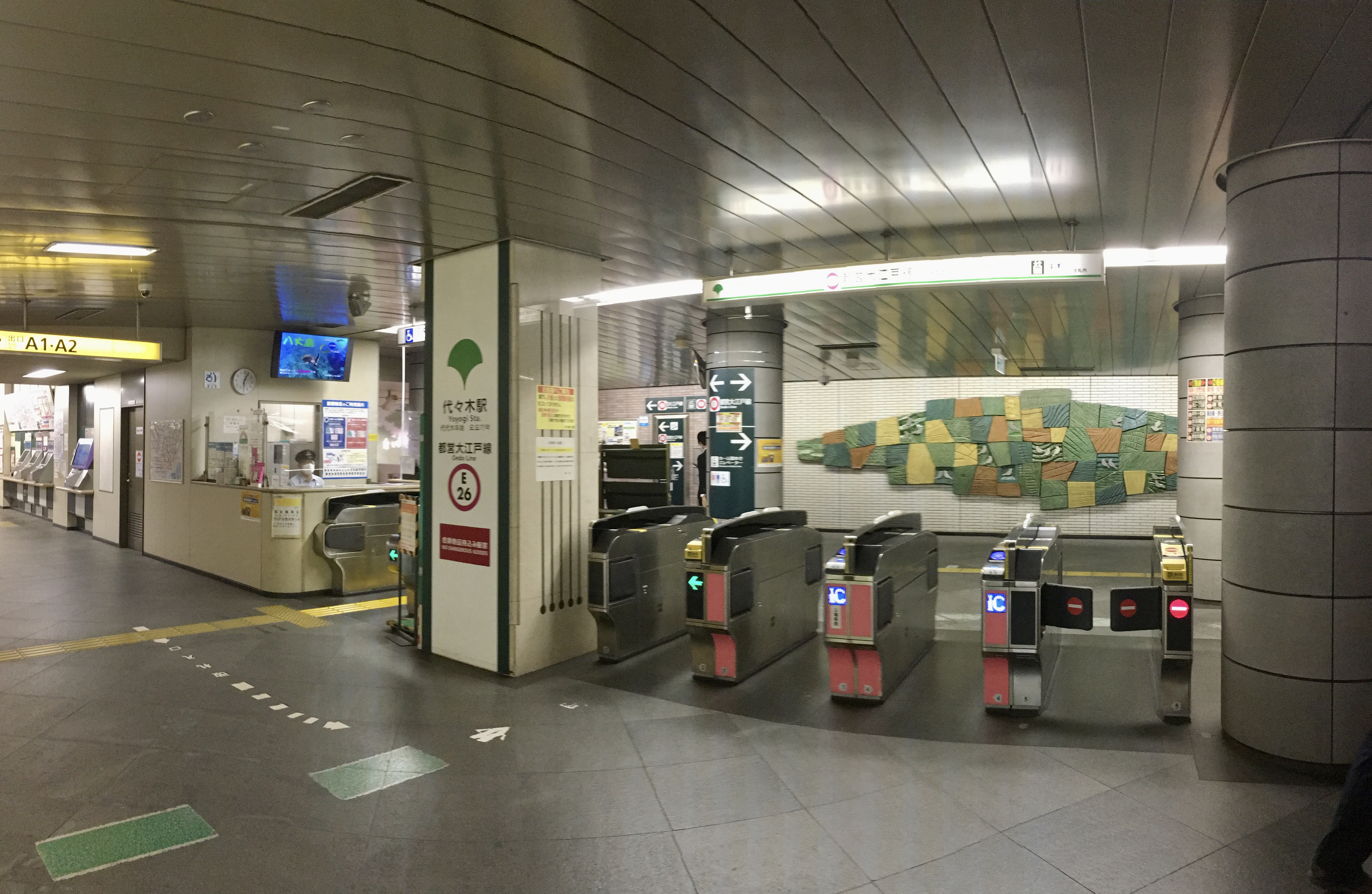
Ticket gates, October 2020

== History ==
The station first opened on 23 October 1906 by a private company as a station on the Chūō Main Line, but was nationalized only a week later when the Japanese National Railways (JNR) took over the company and all of its assets. The underground Toei Ōedo Line station opened on 20 April 2000.

Station numbering was introduced to the JR East platforms in 2016 with Yoyogi being assigned station numbers JB11 for the Chūō-Sobu line, and JY18 for the Yamanote line.

== Passenger statistics ==
In fiscal 2013, the JR East station was used by an average of 70,016 passengers daily (boarding passengers only), making it the 63rd-busiest station operated by JR East. In fiscal 2013, the Toei station was used by an average of 17,382 passengers daily (boarding passengers only). The daily average passenger figures (boarding passengers only) for JR East in previous years are as shown below.

Fiscal year	Daily average
2000	55,062
2005	68,471
2010	69,704
2011	69,466
2012	70,418
2013	70,016

== See also ==
- List of railway stations in Japan
- Transportation in Greater Tokyo
