= Yoyogi-Hachiman Station =

Railway station in Tokyo, Japan

Coordinates: 35.6697°N 139.6889°E

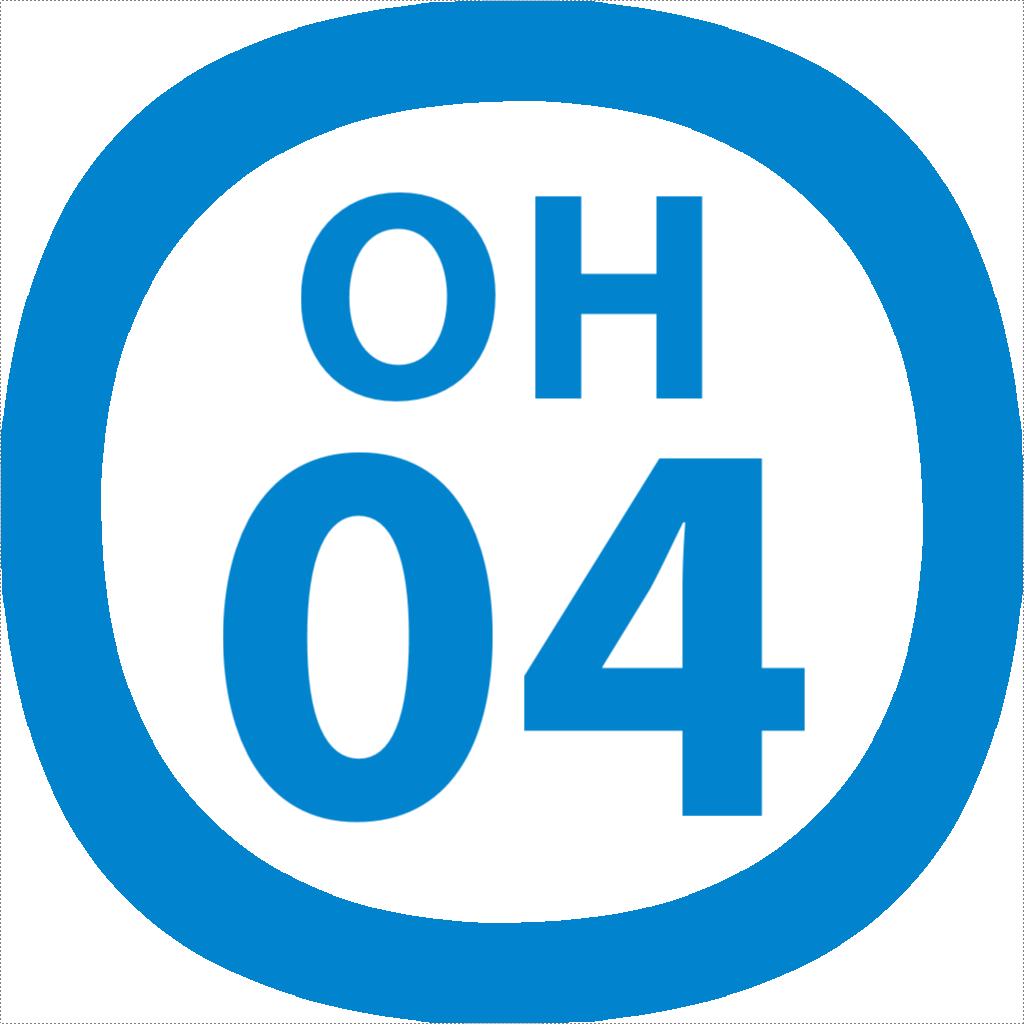
Yoyogi-Hachiman Station 代々木八幡駅

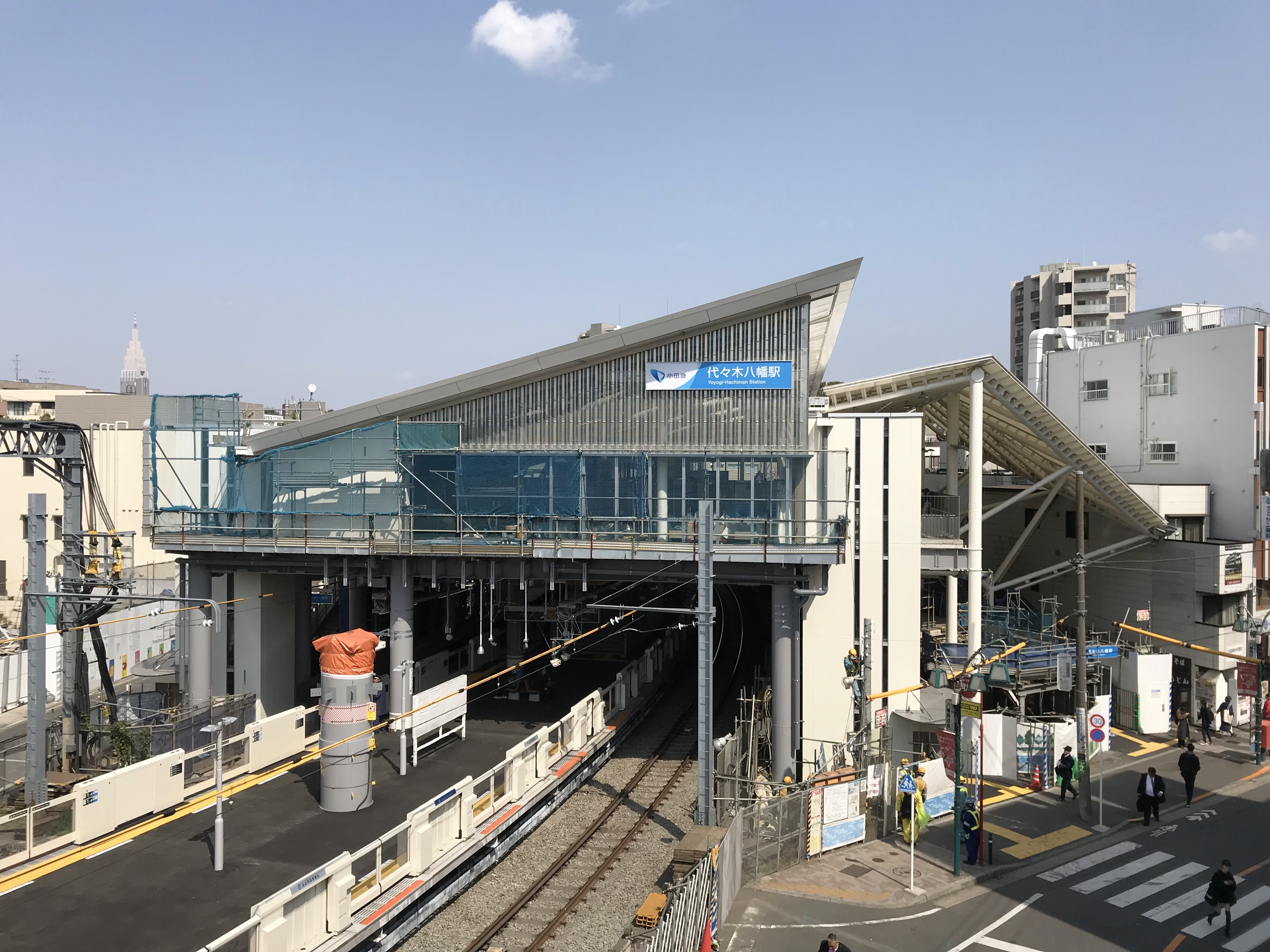
- South building in March 2019

General information
- Location: Shibuya, Tokyo; Japan
- Operator: Odakyu Electric Railway
- Line: Odakyū Odawara Line
- Platforms: 1 Island platform
- Tracks: 2

Construction
- Structure type: Ground level
- Accessible: Yes

History
- Opened: 1 April 1927; 99 years ago
- Rebuilt: 2019

Passengers
- FY2023: 18,237 daily ▲2.4%
- Rank: 53 out of 70

Services
Preceding station	Odakyu	Following station
Yoyogi-Uehara towards Odawara	Odawara Line Local	Sangubashi towards Shinjuku
Location

Yoyogi-Hachiman Station (代々木八幡駅, Yoyogi-Hachiman-eki) is a railway station on the Odakyu Odawara Line in Shibuya-ku, Tokyo, Japan, operated by the private railway operator Odakyu Electric Railway.

== Station layout ==
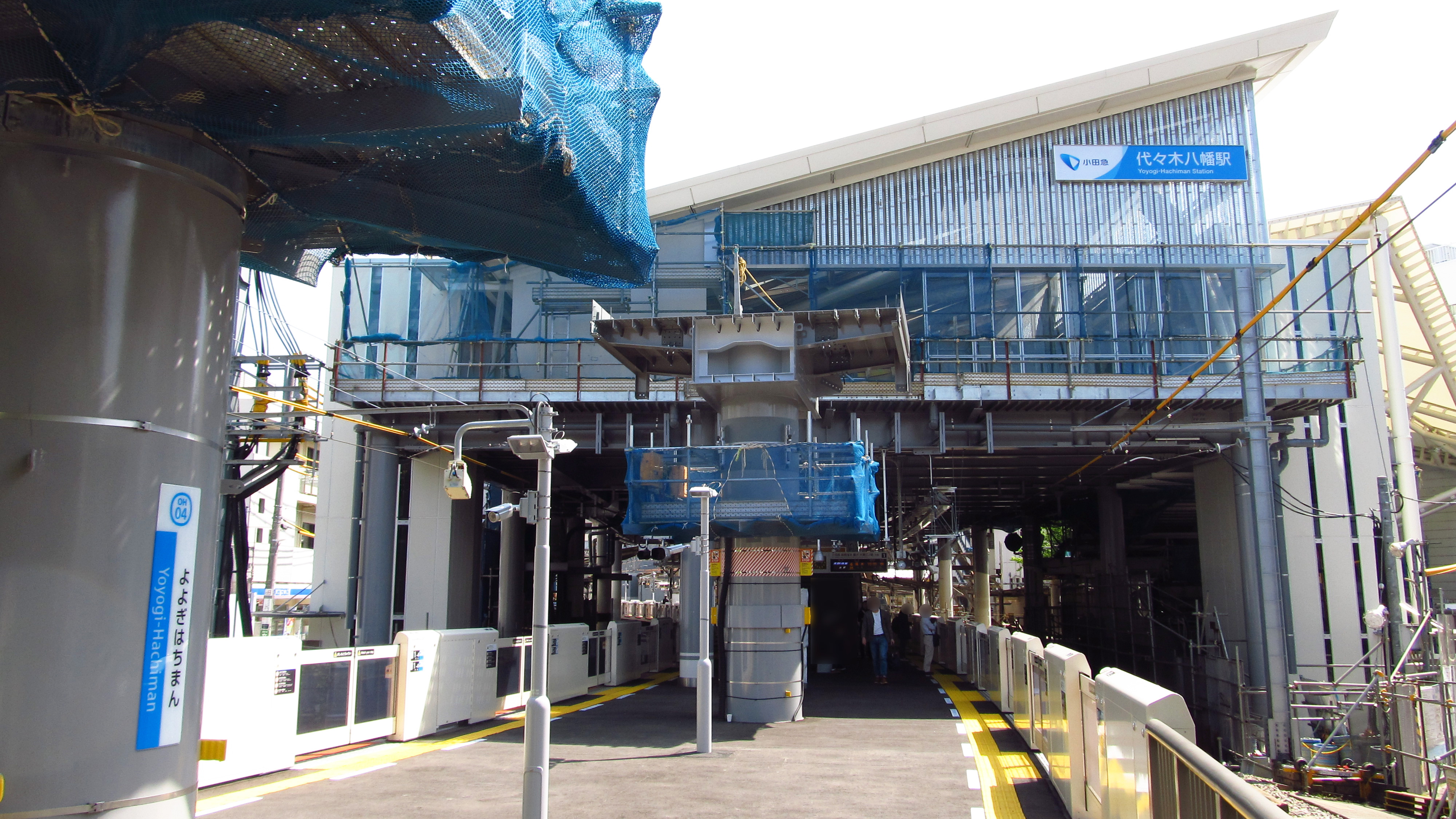
Station platform in April 2019

Originally, the station had two side platforms serving two tracks. However, the station had been converted from two side platforms to a single island platform with half-height platform edge doors. The new station was completed in 2019.

=== Platforms ===
1	Odakyū Odawara Line	for Machida, Hon-Atsugi and Odawara; Hakone-Tozan Railway for Hakone-Yumoto; Odakyu Enoshima Line for Fujisawa and Katase-Enoshima
2	Odakyu Odawara Line	for Shinjuku

== History ==
The station opened on 1 April 1927.

Station numbering was introduced in 2014 with Yoyogi-Hachiman being assigned station number OH04.

Renovation works were completed in 2019 and trains switched to the new layout beginning on 16 March of that year.

== Surrounding area ==
- Yoyogi Park
- Yoyogi-Koen Station (Tokyo Metro Chiyoda Line)
