= Harajuku Station =

Railway station in Tokyo, Japan

Coordinates: 35°40′13″N 139°42′10″E

JY19 Harajuku Station 原宿駅
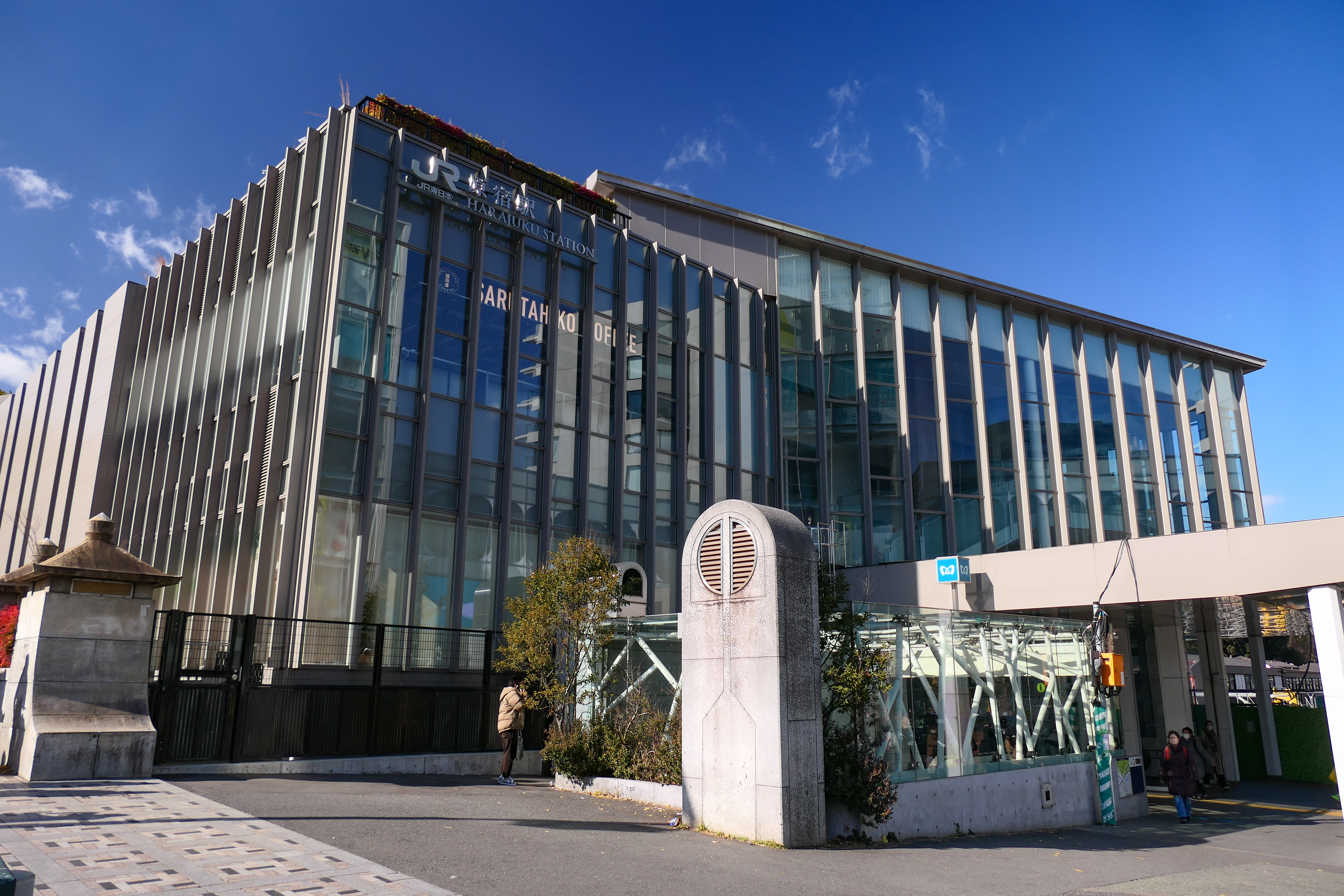
- Harajuku Station building in January 2023

General information
- Location: 1 Jingumae, Shibuya, Tokyo; Japan
- Operator: JR East
- Line: Yamanote Line
- Platforms: 2 side platforms
- Tracks: 4
- Connections: Meiji-jingumae Station

Other information
- Station code: JY19
- Website: Official website

History
- Opened: 30 October 1906; 119 years ago
- Rebuilt: 2020; 6 years ago

Passengers
- FY2024: 134,814 (daily)

Services
Preceding station	JR East	Following station
Shibuya Next counter-clockwise	Yamanote Line	Yoyogi JY18 Next clockwise
Location
- Location within Tokyo Yamanote Loop Location within Tokyo wards area Location within Japan

Harajuku Station (原宿駅, Harajuku-eki) is a railway station in Shibuya, Tokyo, Japan, operated by East Japan Railway Company (JR East). The station takes its name from the area on its eastern side, Harajuku. This station is served by the circular Yamanote Line. It is also adjacent to Meiji-Jingumae Station on the Tokyo Metro Chiyoda and Fukutoshin Lines, and is marked as an interchange on most route maps, although there is no physical connection between the two stations.

== History ==
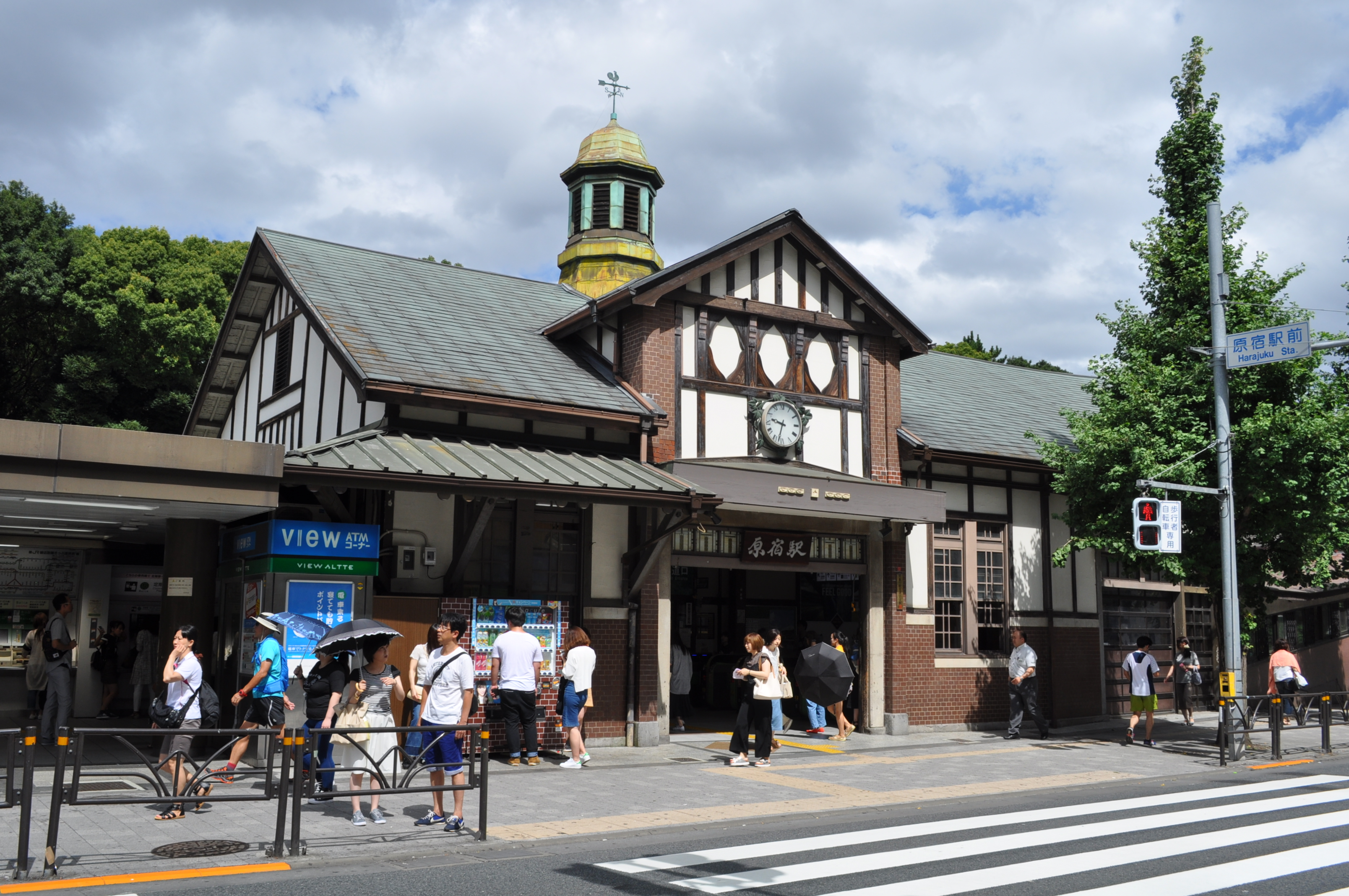
Original station building in 2016

The station opened on 30 October 1906 by the Nippon Railway, although the station was nationalized under the Railway Nationalization Act just two days later. The station was opened as a infill station between Shibuya and Yoyogi in response to growing local population. Ridership increased after the construction of the Meiji Shrine in 1920, when it became the closest railway station to the shrine. The station building was rebuilt in 1924 after the 1923 Great Kantō earthquake.

Platform edge doors were installed on the platforms in November 2014, and brought into operation from December. Station numbering was introduced in 2016 with Harajuku being assigned station number JY19.

=== 2020 renovations ===
In June 2016, JR East announced plans to rebuild the station ahead of the 2020 Olympics in order to alleviate overcrowding. A new station building was to be built by JR East at the station's Meiji-Jingu entrance. A temporary platform used during busy periods will become the permanent platform for trains heading north through the station. The new station building and platform opened on 21 March 2020, in time for the Tokyo Olympics and Paralympics. JR East decided in November 2019 to demolish the old wooden station building at the Takeshita entrance on safety grounds after the Paralympics, and replace it with a safer structure constructed in a similar style.

In 2024, East Japan Railway Company (JR east) made an announcement that the original 1924 station building, which was the oldest wooden station building in Tokyo, will be returning as part of a new development project. The construction is set to run in 2026, with the opening of the commercial facility scheduled for the winter of that year. The new complex, which consists of a basement level and four levels above it, will stretch across a site of 1,170 square metres (0.1 hectares).

== Station layout ==
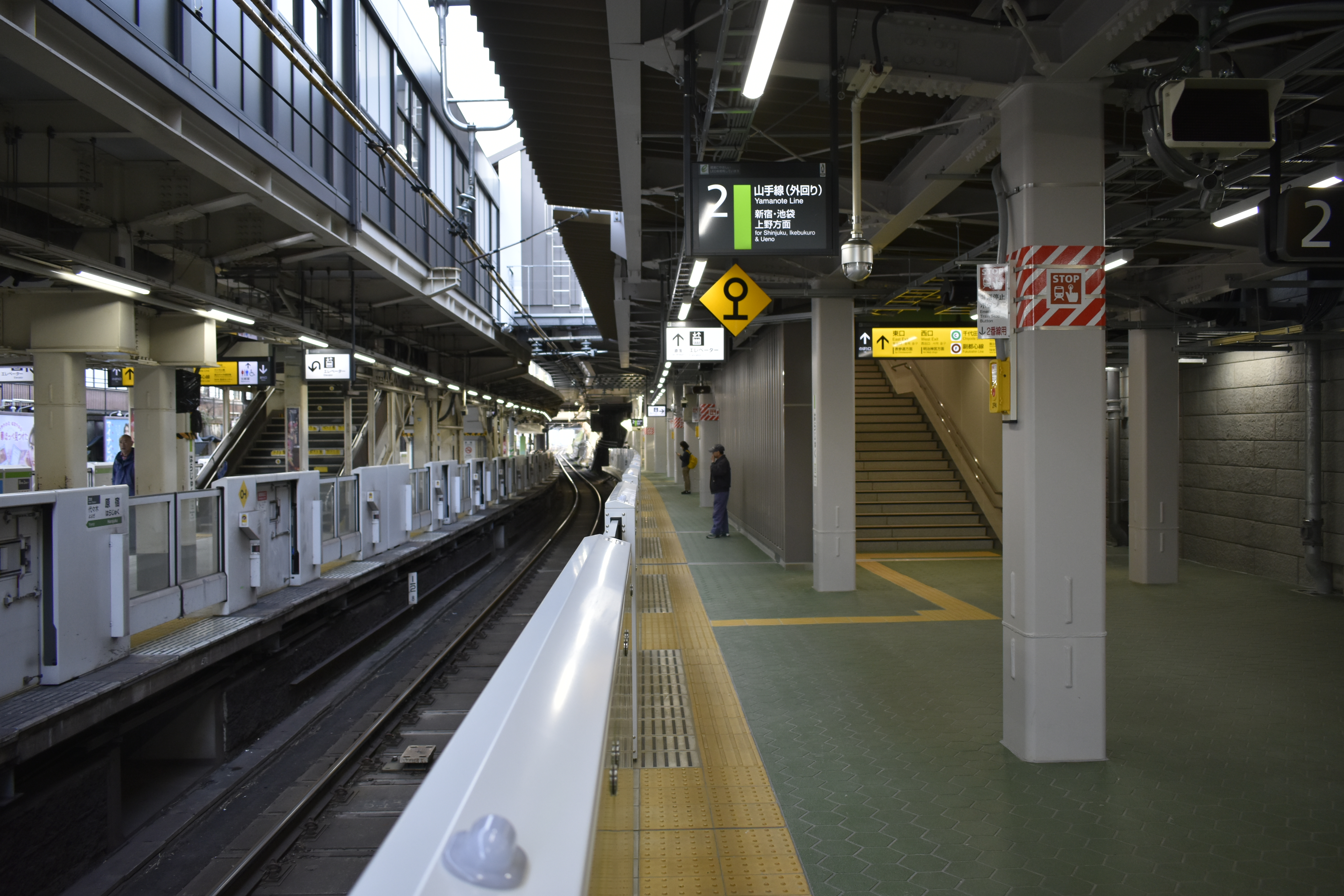
The Yamanote line platforms in 2020

The station consists of a two side platforms serving two tracks. The station was initially an island platform with an additional temporary platform for the Shinjuku direction during major events only. The temporary platform was made permanent during the 2020 renovations, and the two platforms now serve different directions.

=== Platforms ===
1	Yamanote Line	for Shibuya and Shinagawa
2	Yamanote Line	for Shinjuku and Ikebukuro

=== Imperial train platform ===
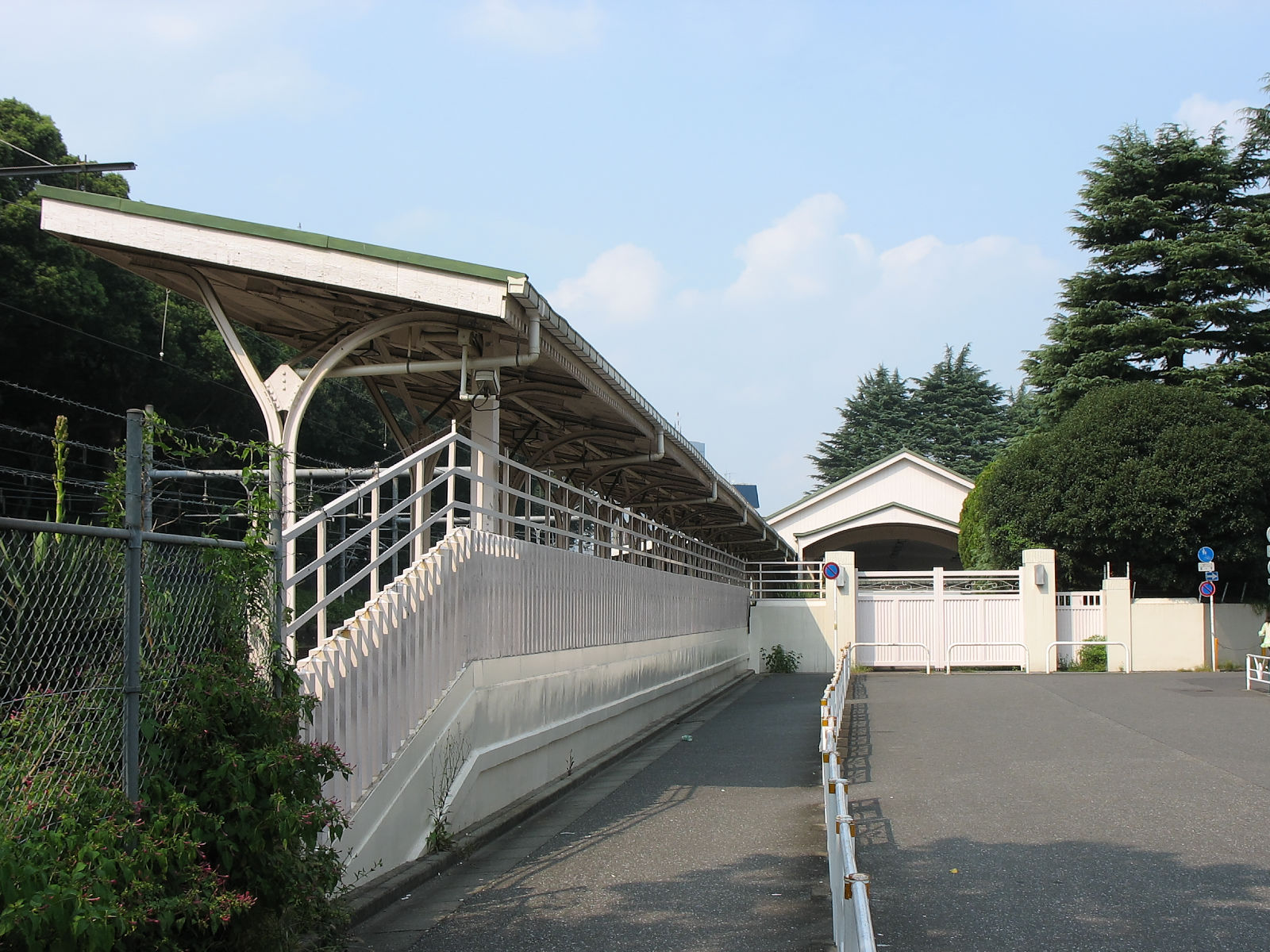
Outside of the Imperial train platform

To the north of the station there is a separate platform serving a loop on the east side of the freight line for use by the Imperial train. The platform has not been used since 2001, in part because the opening of the Shonan-Shinjuku Line has made it more difficult to schedule special charters on the Yamanote Line corridor The points, signals and rails incidental to the platform are in disrepair, making it impossible to use the platform without some refurbishment.

== Passenger statistics ==
In fiscal 2023, the station was used by an average of 64,985 passengers daily (boarding passengers only), making it the sixty-fourth-busiest station operated by JR East.

Fiscal year	Daily average
2000	71,364
2005	73,446
2010	71,456
2011	69,750
2012	71,472
2013	70,866
2023	64,985

== Surrounding area ==
- Meiji Shrine
- Yoyogi Park
- Takeshita Street

== See also ==
- List of railway stations in Japan
- Transport in Greater Tokyo
