= Kitami Station =

Kitami Station may refer to:

- Kitami Station (Tokyo) (喜多見駅), station on the Odakyu Odawara Line, in Tokyo, Japan
- Kitami Station (Hokkaido) (北見駅), JR Hokkaido station on the Sekihoku Line, in Kitami, Hokkaido, Japan
