= Jidayu Koizumi =

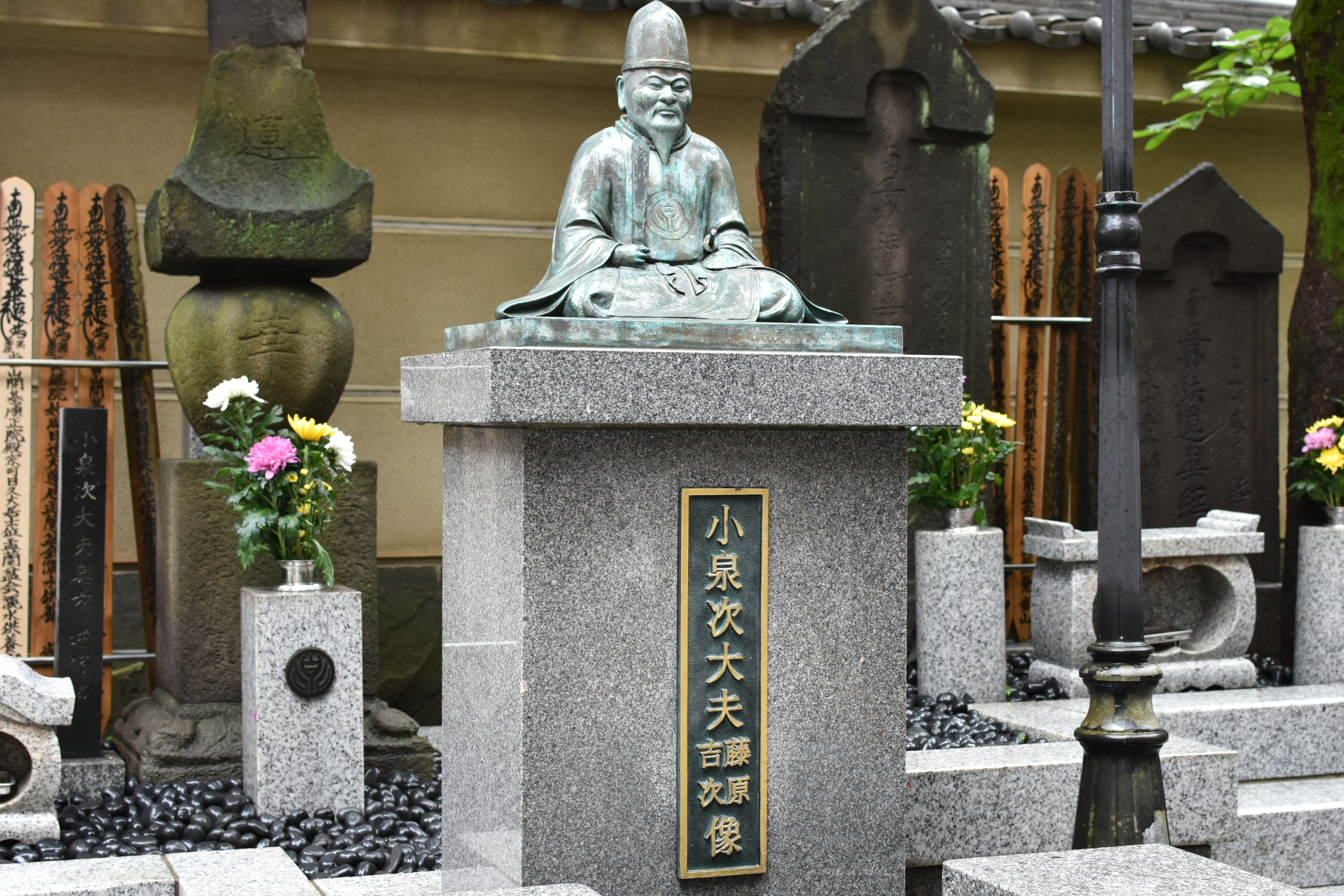
- Statue of Jidayu Koizumi
- Lord: Imagawa Ujizane (until 1615); Tokugawa Ieyasu (after 1615)
- Born: 1539
- Died: January 27, 1624 (aged 84–85)
Era name and dates
- Shogunate: Tokugawa
- Clans: Uematsu → Koizumi (renamed)

Jidayu Koizumi (小泉次大夫, 1539 - 1624 January 27) was the Secretary of Water and Hatamoto magistrate of the early Edo period.

Koizumi was responsible for creating the Rokugo and Nikaryo canals along the Tama River in order to irrigate surrounding farmland.

Other engineering projects created by Koizumi can be found in Jidayubori park along the Nogawa River.
