= Kitami Friendship Square =

Park in Tokyo, Japan

Coordinates: 35.642°N 139.588°E

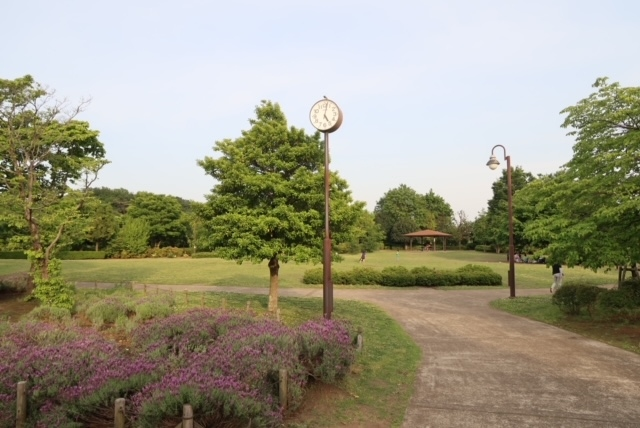
Central area of the park, Kitami Friendship Square, May 2016

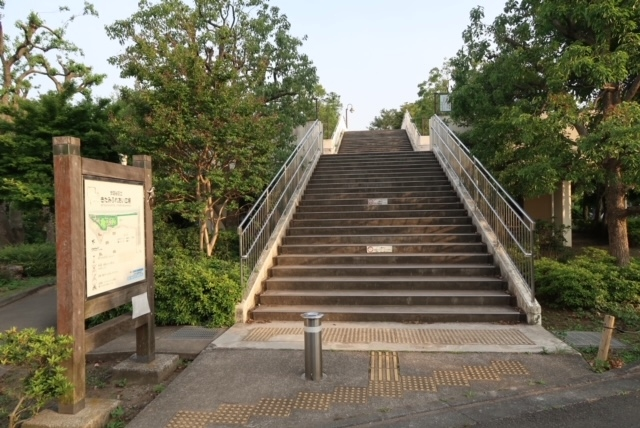
Stairs from the Nogawa river on the east side of Kitami Friendship Square, May 2016

Kitami Friendship Square (きたみふれあい広場, Kitami fureai hiroba) is a park in Kitami, Setagaya, Tokyo. The total area is 38,824.83 m^{2}. Kitami Friendship Square is built over an Odakyu Railway train maintenance facility. It is adjacent to the Nogawa River and part of the Nogawa River Greenbelt. As an elevated park it can be approached on the north, west and east (river) sides either by stairs or ramps.

== Facilities ==
There are various facilities including cherry trees, open grassy areas, a pond, fitness equipment, a children's play area, a sandpit, public washrooms and ramps providing disabled access on the east and west sides. As the park is approximately 10 metres above the railway tracks, it provides views of the Nogawa river offering the possibility of birdwatching on the east side, and of the Odakyu Odawara Line to the south, as well as more distant views of Mount Fuji and other peaks to the west and north-west.

== Access ==
The neareast station is Kitami Station on the Odakyu Odawara Line which is 0.4 miles away (approximately 7 minutes walking distance).

== History ==
The park was built above the Odakyu Railyard and opened in March 1997.
