= Komae Station =

Railway station in Komae, Tokyo, Japan

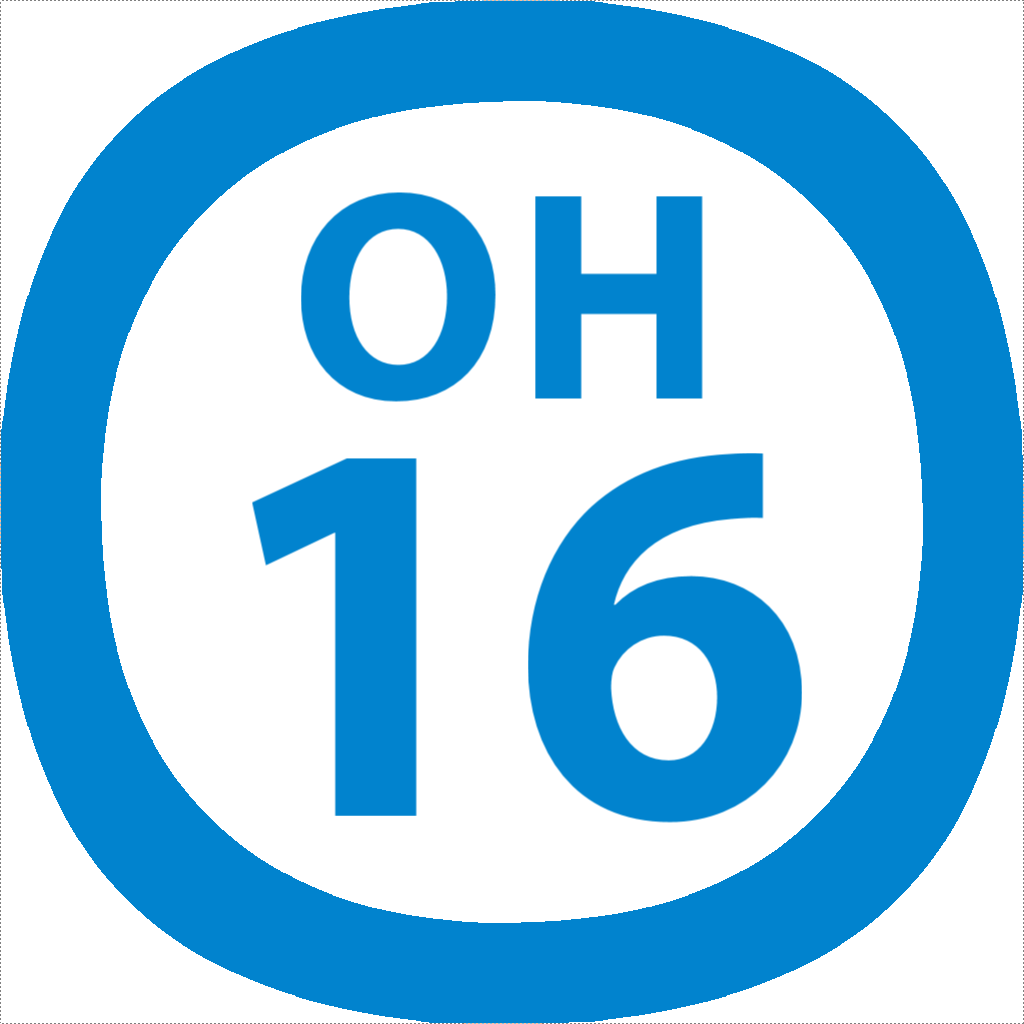
Komae Station 狛江駅

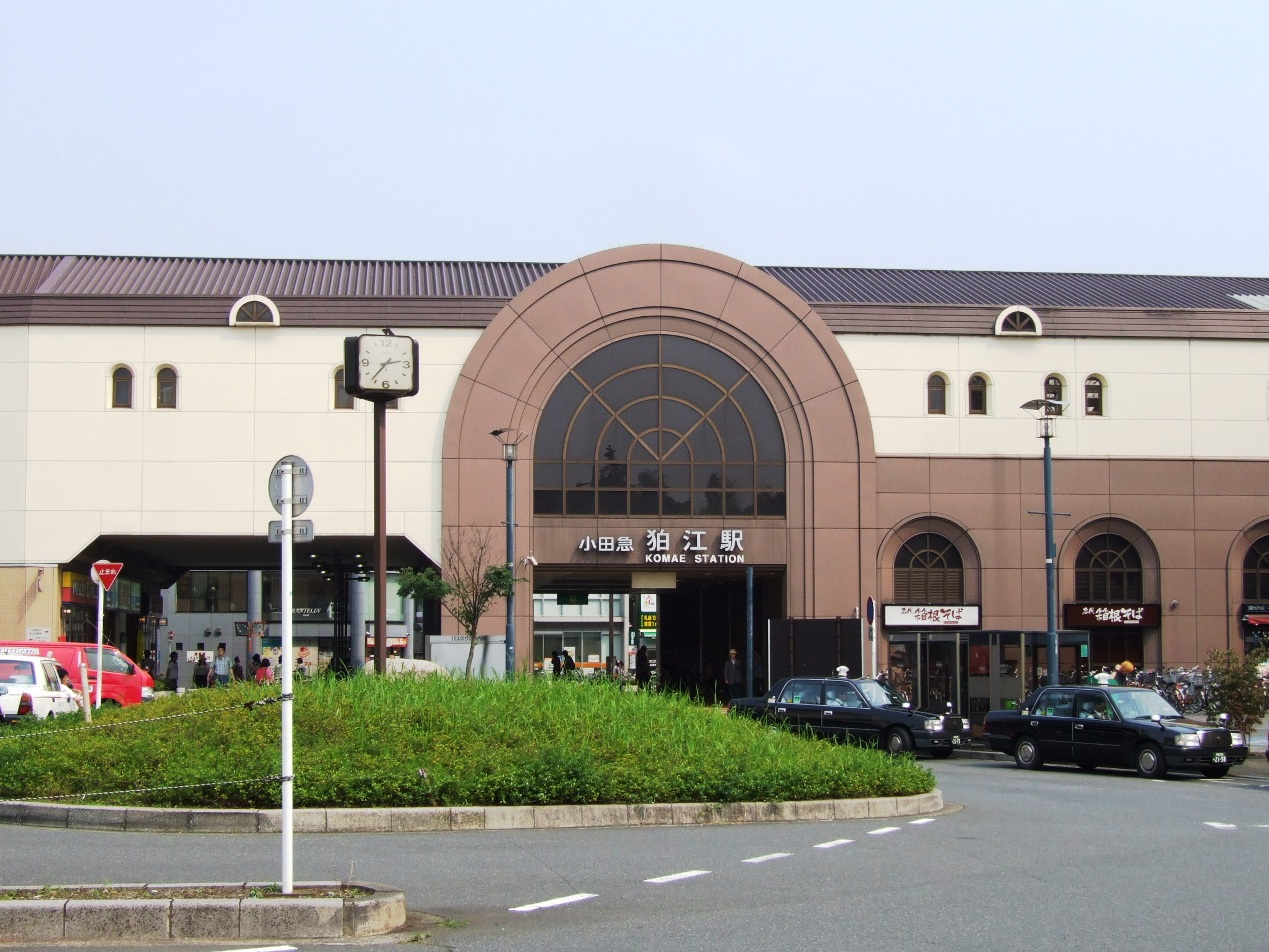
- Komae Station entrance

General information
- Location: 1-17-1 Higashi-Izumi, Komae-shi, Tokyo; Japan
- Coordinates: 35.6319°N 139.5771°E
- Operator: Odakyu Electric Railway
- Line: Odakyu Odawara Line
- Distance: 13.8 km from Shinjuku
- Platforms: 2 side platforms
- Connections: Bus stop

Other information
- Station code: OH16
- Website: Official website

History
- Opened: 27 May 1927; 99 years ago

Passengers
- FY2019: 48,921 daily

Services
Preceding station	Odakyu	Following station
Izumi-Tamagawa towards Odawara	Odawara Line Semi Express Local	Kitami towards Shinjuku or Yoyogi-Uehara
Location
- Location within Tokyo Location within Japan

Komae Station (狛江駅, Komae-eki) is a passenger railway station located in the city of Komae, Tokyo, Japan, operated by the private railway operator Odakyu Electric Railway.

== Lines ==
Komae Station is served by the Odakyu Odawara Line from Shinjuku to Odawara, and is located 13.8 km (8.6 mi) from the starting point of the line at Shinjuku Station.

== Station layout ==
The elevated station has two side platforms and four tracks. The two outermost tracks are the local tracks allowing local trains to stop at the station. There are two additional inner tracks to allow express trains to bypass the station. The station's building is located underneath the station. The space under the train tracks on either side of the concourse is occupied by commercial facilities and a bicycle parking area.

== History ==
Komae Station was opened on 27 May 1927. The station was not included in the initial construction plans for the Odakyu railway line, but local residents successfully campaigned for a station to be built in this neighbourhood.

Throughout the 1990s it was extensively redeveloped as part of the Odakyu Line's track doubling project. Previous to the redevelopment, the platforms were on ground level and linked by an overhead bridge.

Station numbering was introduced in January 2014 with Komae being assigned station number OH16.

== Passenger statistics ==
In fiscal 2019, the station had an average of 48,921 passengers daily.

== Surroundings ==
The station is surrounded by a suburban commercial district, including a small shopping centre built under the train tracks. Komae City Hall lies to the north of the station.

== See also ==
- List of railway stations in Japan
