= Hatamoto =

Japanese title

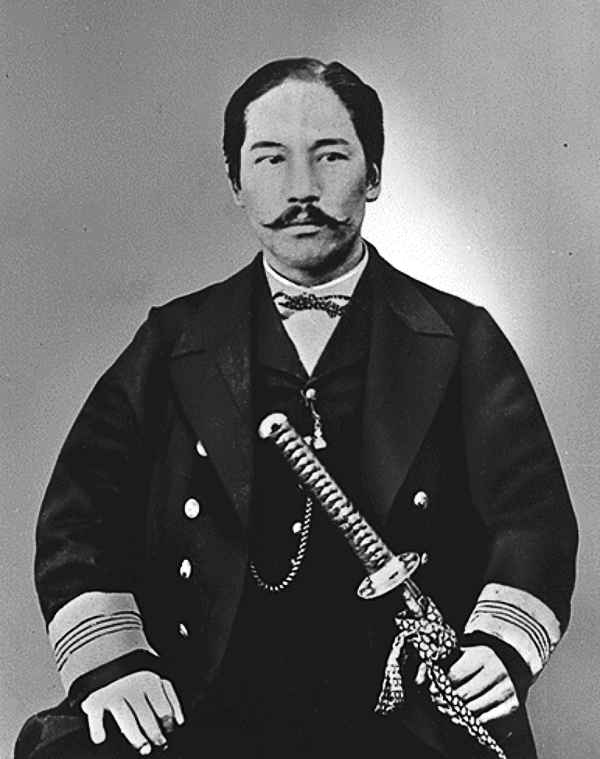
Enomoto Takeaki, a hatamoto of the late Edo period

A hatamoto (旗本; "Guardian of the banner") was a high ranking samurai in the direct service of the Tokugawa shogunate of feudal Japan. While all three of the shogunates in Japanese history had official retainers, in the two preceding ones, they were referred to as gokenin. However, in the Edo period, hatamoto were the upper vassals of the Tokugawa house, and the gokenin were the lower vassals. There was no precise difference between the two in terms of income level, but a hatamoto had the right to an audience with the shogun, whereas gokenin did not. The word hatamoto literally means "origin/base of the flag", with the sense of 'around the flag', it is described in Japanese as 'those who guard the flag' (on the battlefield) and is often translated into English as "bannerman". Another term for the Edo-era hatamoto was jikisan hatamoto (直参旗本), sometimes rendered as "direct shogunal hatamoto", which serves to illustrate the difference between them and the preceding generation of hatamoto who served various lords.

== History ==
The term hatamoto originated in the Sengoku period. The term was used for the direct retainers of a lord; as the name suggests, the men who were grouped "around of the flag". Many lords had hatamoto; however, when the Tokugawa clan achieved ascendancy in 1600, its hatamoto system was institutionalized, and it is that system which is chiefly referred to now when using the term.

In the eyes of the Tokugawa shogunate, hatamoto were retainers who had served the family from its days in Mikawa onward. However, the ranks of the hatamoto also included people from outside the hereditary ranks of the Tokugawa house. Retainer families of defeated formerly grand families like the Takeda, Hōjō, or Imagawa were included, as were cadet branches of lord families. Also included were heirs to lords whose domains were confiscated, for example Asano Daigaku, the brother of Asano Naganori, local power figures in remote parts of the country who never became daimyōs; and the families of Kamakura and Muromachi periods Shugo (Governors): some of these include the Akamatsu, Besshō (branch of the Akamatsu), Hōjō, Hatakeyama, Kanamori (branch of the Toki), Imagawa, Mogami (branch of the Ashikaga), Nagai, Oda, Ōtomo, Takeda, Toki, Takenaka (branch of the Toki), Takigawa, Tsutsui, and Yamana families. The act of becoming a hatamoto was known as bakushin toritate (幕臣取り立て; lit. 'promoted to the shogunate').

Many hatamoto fought in the Boshin War of 1868, on both sides of the conflict.

The hatamoto remained retainers of the main Tokugawa clan after the fall of the shogunate in 1868, and followed the Tokugawa to their new domain of Shizuoka. The hatamoto lost their status along with all other samurai in Japan following the abolition of the domains in 1871.

== Ranks and roles ==
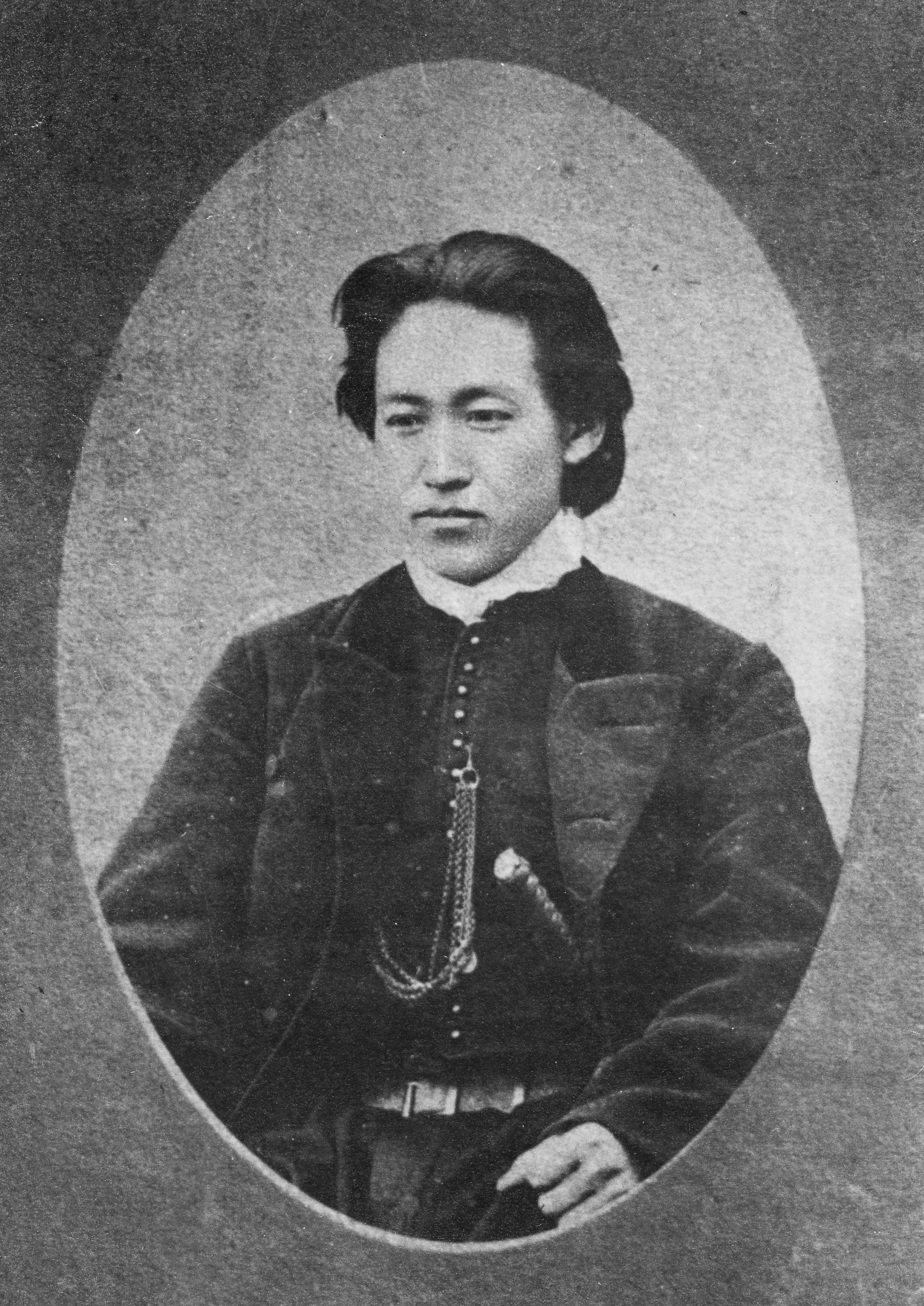
Hijikata Toshizō of the Shinsengumi became a hatamoto shortly before the end of the Edo period

The division between hatamoto and gokenin, especially amongst hatamoto of lower rank, was not rigid, and the title of hatamoto had more to do with rank rather than income rating. In the context of an army, it could be compared to the position of an officer. Throughout the Edo period, hatamoto held the distinction that if they possessed high enough rank, they had the right to personal audience with the shogun (these hatamoto were known as ome-mie ijō). All hatamoto can be divided into two categories, the kuramaitori, who took their incomes straight from Tokugawa granaries, and the jikatatori, who held land scattered throughout Japan. Another level of status distinction amongst the hatamoto was the class of kōtai-yoriai, men who were heads of hatamoto families and held provincial fiefs, and had alternate attendance (sankin-kōtai) duties like the daimyōs. However, as kōtai-yoriai were men of very high income in terms of the spectrum of hatamoto stipends, not all jikatatori hatamoto had the duty of alternate attendance. The dividing line between the upper hatamoto and the fudai daimyōs'—the domain lords who were also vassals of the Tokugawa house—was 10,000 koku.

At the beginning of the 18th century, about 5,000 samurai held the rank of hatamoto; over two thirds of these had an income of less than 400 koku and only about 100 earned 5,000 koku or more. A hatamoto with 500 koku had seven permanent non-samurai servants, two swordsmen, a lancer, and an archer on standby.

Infrequently, some hatamoto were granted an increase in income and thus promoted to the rank of fudai daimyō. One example of such a promotion is the case of the Hayashi family of Kaibuchi (later known as Jōzai han), who began as jikatatori hatamoto but who became fudai daimyōs and went on to play a prominent role in the Boshin War, despite their domain's relatively small size of 10,000 koku.

The term for a hatamoto with income of about 8,000 koku or greater was taishin hatamoto ("greater hatamoto").

The hatamoto who lived in Edo resided in their own private districts and oversaw their own police work and security. Men from hatamoto ranks could serve in a variety of roles in the Tokugawa administration, including service in the police force as yoriki inspectors, city magistrates, magistrates or tax collectors of direct Tokugawa house land, members of the wakadoshiyori council, and many other positions.

The expression "eighty thousand hatamoto" (旗本八万旗, hatamoto hachimanhata) was in popular use to denote their numbers, but a 1722 study put their numbers at about 5,000. Adding the gokenin brought the number up to about 17,000.

== Famous hatamoto ==
Famous hatamoto include Jidayu Koizumi, Nakahama Manjirō, Ōoka Tadasuke, Tōyama Kagemoto, Katsu Kaishū, Enomoto Takeaki, Hijikata Toshizō, Nagai Naoyuki, and the two Westerners William Adams and Jan Joosten van Lodensteijn.

== Hatamoto and the martial arts ==
Hatamoto patronized the development of the martial arts in the Edo period; many of them were involved in the running of dojo in the Edo area and elsewhere. Two hatamoto who were directly involved in the development of the martial arts were Yagyū Munenori and Yamaoka Tesshū. Munenori's family became hereditary sword instructors to the shogun.

== In popular culture ==
Hatamoto appeared as figures in popular culture even before the Edo era ended. Recent depictions of hatamoto include in the TV series Hatchōbori no Shichinin, the manga Fūunjitachi Bakumatsu-hen, and Osamu Tezuka's manga Hidamari no ki. The real-time strategy video game series Age of Empires features hatamoto in its Age of Empires III: The Asian Dynasties expansion, again in Age of Empires IV as Samurai Bannermen, in both games they are especially powerful variants of the samurai.

In the novel Shōgun (subject of a 1980 television series, and a 2024 remake), the protagonist Pilot John Blackthorne, loosely based on William Adams, eventually rises in the service of Lord Toranaga to become samurai and hatamoto.
