= Yutaka Yano =

Japanese politician

- 矢野 裕

Mayor of Komae
- In office 7 July 1996 – 6 July 2012
- Preceded by: Kin'yū Ishii
- Succeeded by: Kunihiko Takahashi

Member of the Komae City Assembly
- In office April 1975 – 30 June 1996

Personal details
- Born: 1 November 1946 (age 79) Setagaya, Tokyo, Japan
- Party: Communist
- Education: Waseda University
- Website: http://yanoy.dip.jp

Yutaka Yano (矢野 裕, Yano Yutaka; born 1 November 1946) is a Japanese former politician who served as the mayor of Komae, Tokyo in Japan. A member of the Japanese Communist Party, he was first elected in 1996.
