= Izumi-Tamagawa Station =

Railway station in Komae, Tokyo, Japan

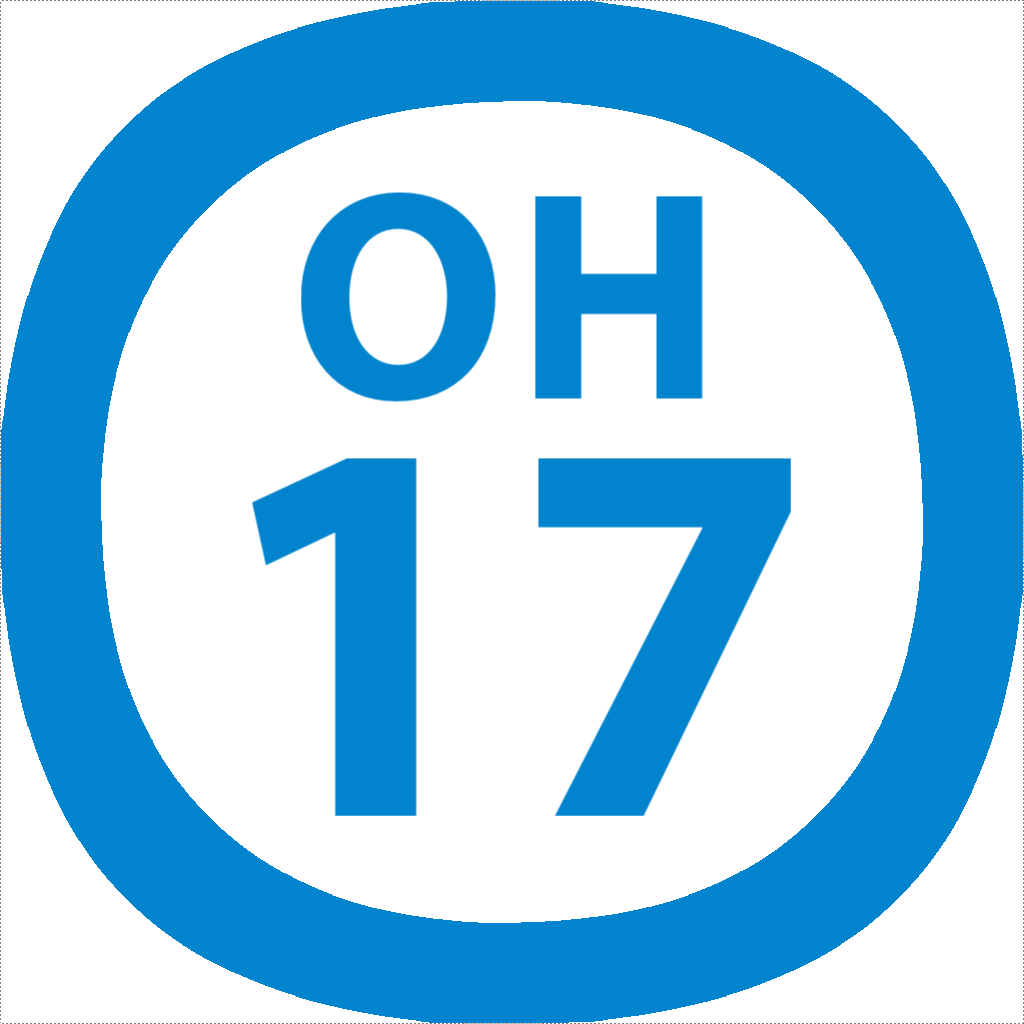
Izumi-Tamagawa Station 和泉多摩川駅

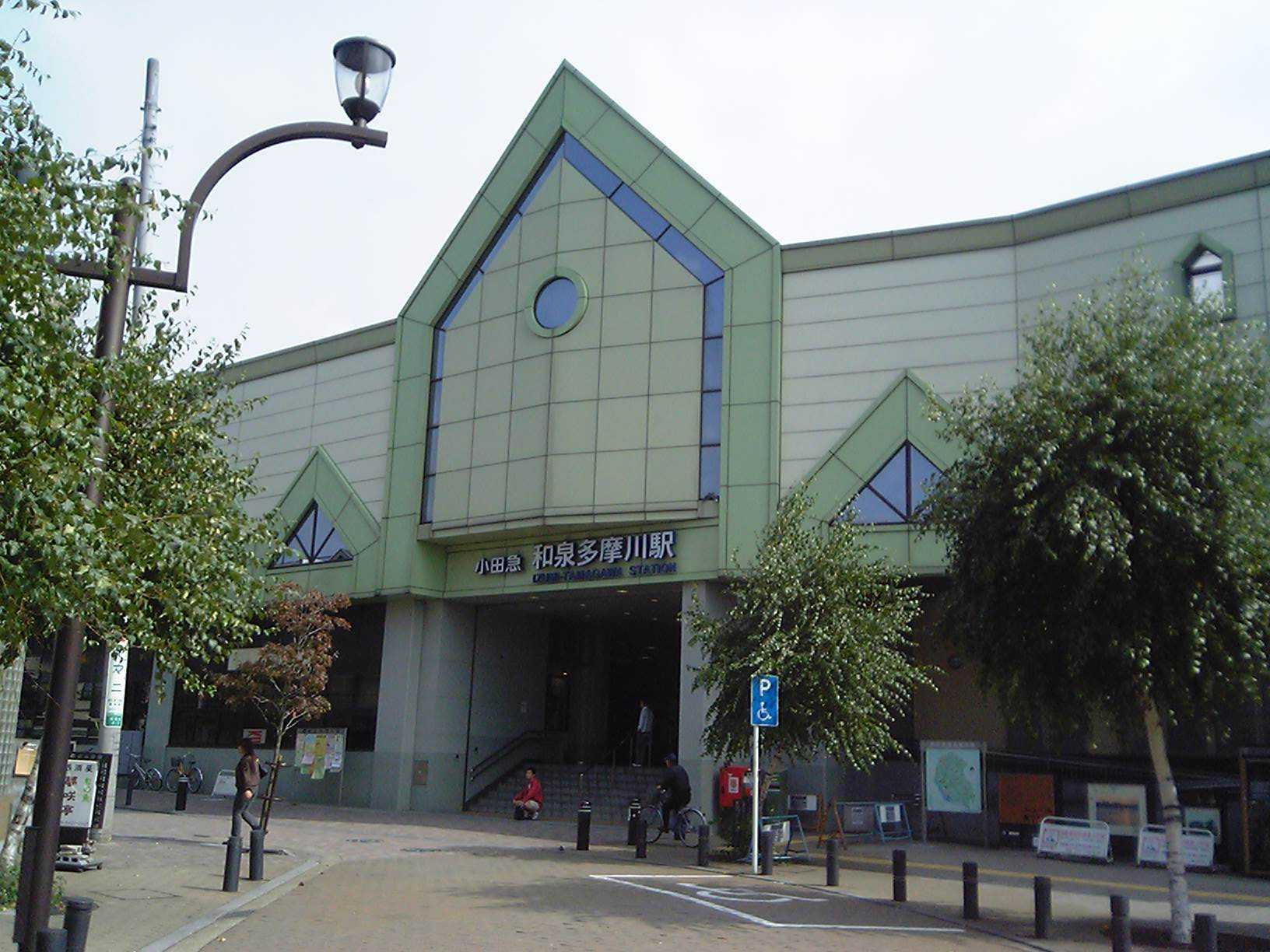
- Izumi-Tamagawa Station entrance, October 2005

General information
- Location: 4-2-1 Higashi-Izumi, Komae-shi, Tokyo 201-0014; Japan
- Coordinates: 35.6271°N 139.5736°E
- Operator: Odakyu Electric Railway
- Line: Odakyu Odawara Line
- Distance: 14.4 km from Shinjuku
- Platforms: 2 side platforms
- Connections: Bus stop

Other information
- Station code: OH17
- Website: Official website

History
- Opened: 1 April 1927; 99 years ago

Passengers
- FY2019: 15,751 daily

Services
Preceding station	Odakyu	Following station
Noborito towards Odawara	Odawara Line Semi Express Local	Komae towards Shinjuku or Yoyogi-Uehara
Location
- Location within Tokyo Location within Japan

Izumi-Tamagawa Station (和泉多摩川駅, Izumi-tamagawa-eki) is a passenger railway station located in the city of Komae, Tokyo, Japan, operated by the private railway operator Odakyu Electric Railway.

== Lines ==
Izumi-tamagawa Station is served by the Odakyu Odawara Line from Shinjuku to Odawara, and is located 14.4 km (8.9 mi) from the starting point of the line at Shinjuku Station.

== Station layout ==
The elevated station has two side platforms and four tracks. The outermost tracks typically serve local trains that stop at the station. The two innermost tracks allow express trains to bypass the station. The station's building is located underneath the elevated structure. The space under the train tracks on either side of the concourse is occupied by commercial facilities and a bicycle parking area.

== History ==
Izumi-Tamagawa Station was opened on 1 April 1927.

Station numbering was introduced in January 2014 with Izumi-tamagawa being assigned station number OH17.

== Passenger statistics ==
In fiscal 2019, the station had an average of 15,751 passengers daily.

== Surrounding area ==
- Komae High School
- Tama River
