= Nogawa River =

River in Japan

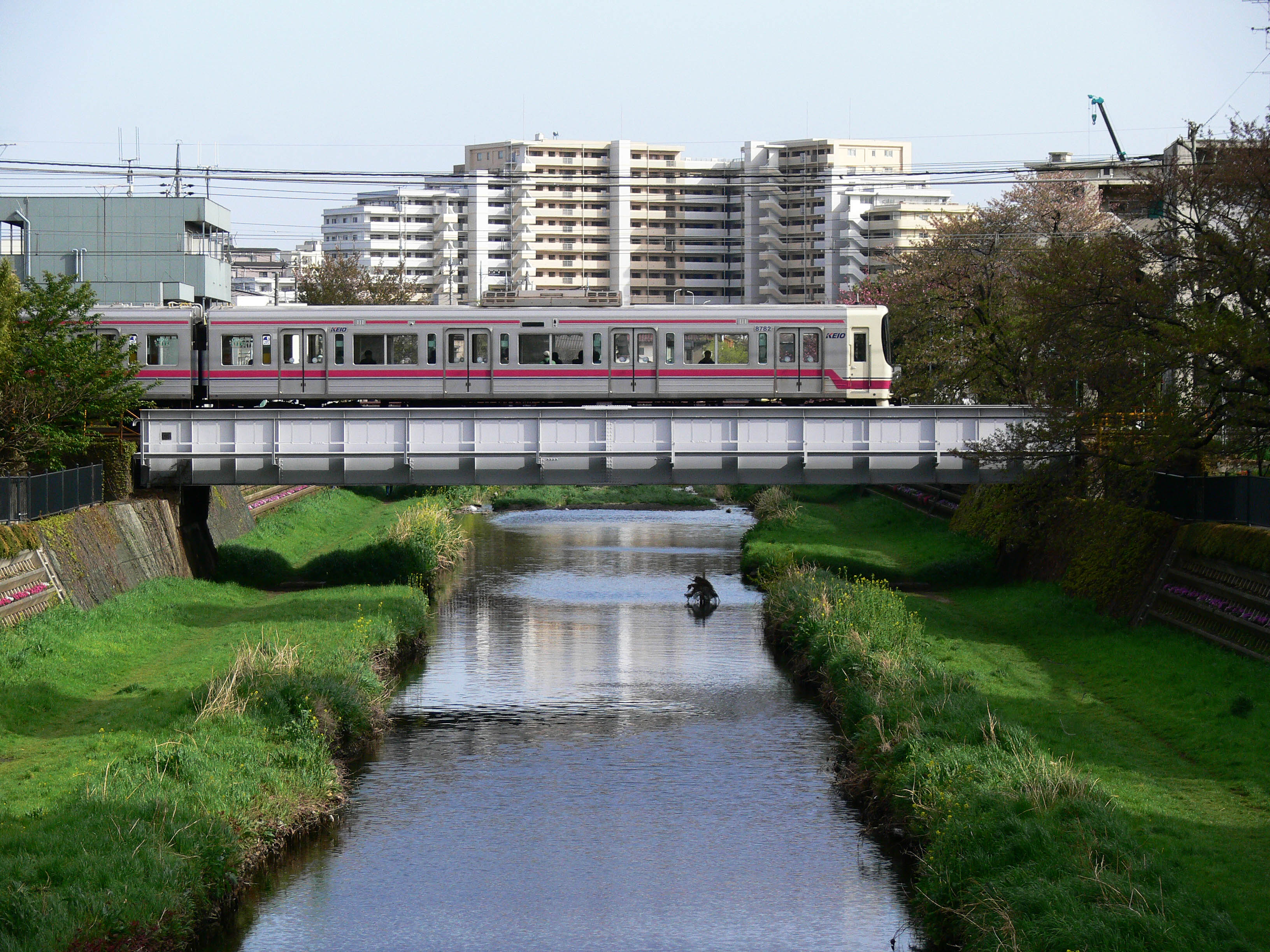

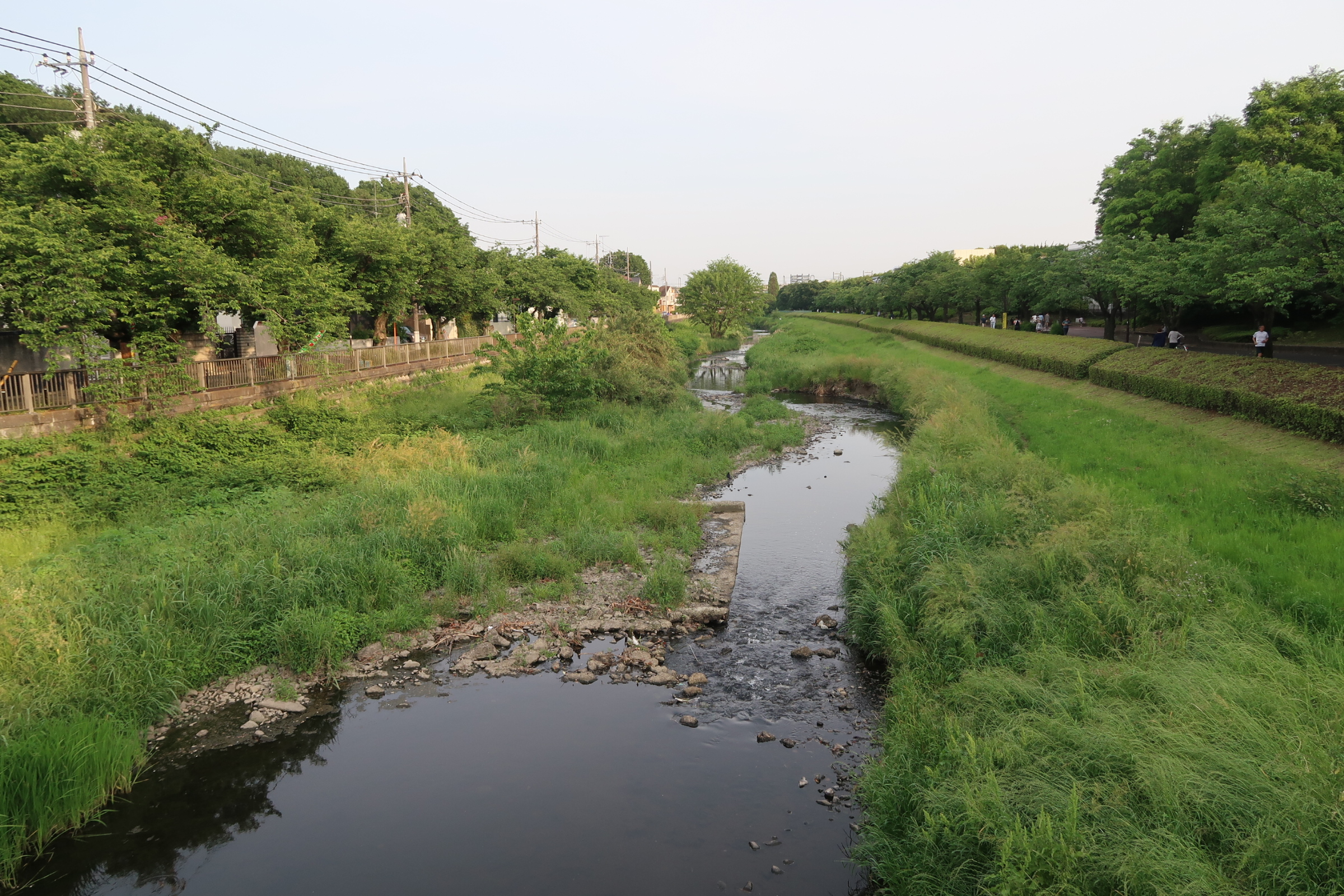
Nogawa River in Kitami, Setagaya in May 2016

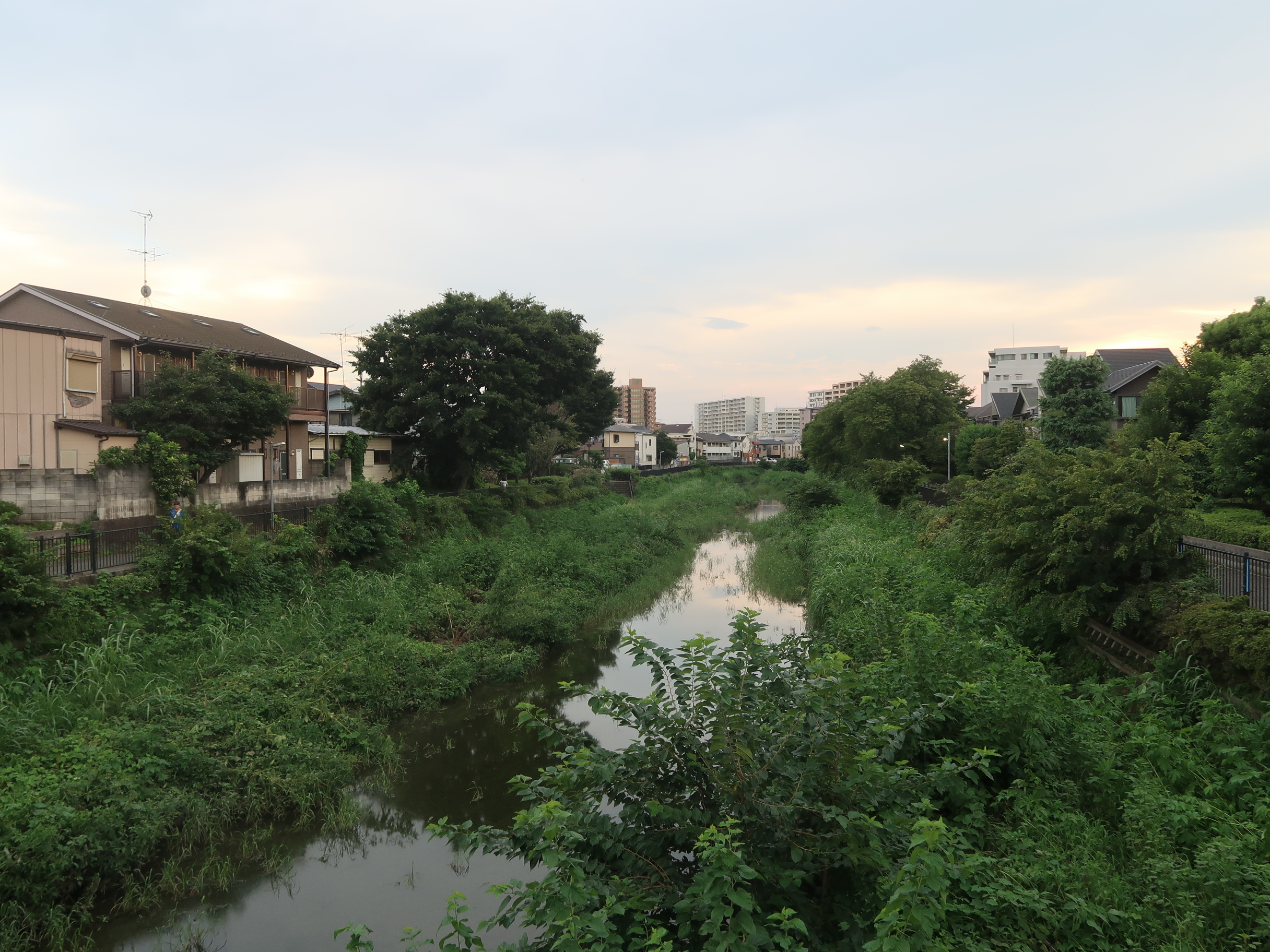
Nogawa River near the boundary of Komae City, Tokyo in August 2017

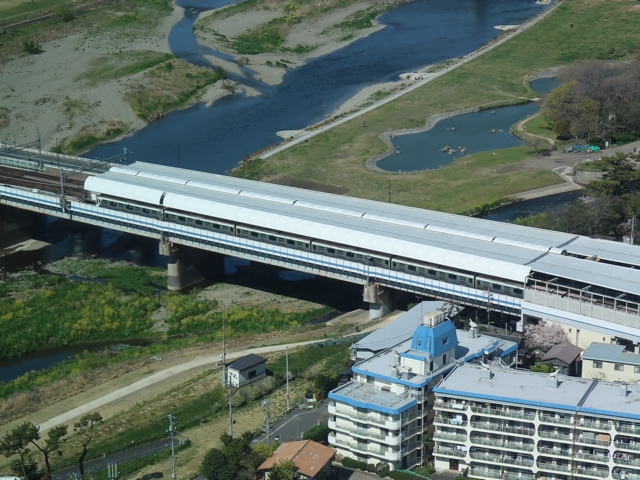
Confluence of Nogawa River (far right) and Tama River (top and left) close to Futakotamagawa Station, Setagaya, Tokyo in April 2019

The Nogawa River (野川, No-gawa) is a river which flows through the west side of central Tokyo, Japan in an area known as the Musashino Terrace.

The source of the river is associated with the Ohike Pond in the gardens of the Hitachi Central Research Laboratory just west of Kokubunji Station in the city of Kokubunji. It flows south and then east (receiving water from springs in the adjacent Tonogayato Garden). Having entered Fuchu it then proceeds in a south-easterly direction through the cities of Koganei, Mitaka and Chofu. From Chofu it briefly enters Komae City before crossing into the special ward of Setagaya from where it finally empties into the Tama River close to Futakotamagawa Station. The confluence point is near the parallel bridges carrying national route 246 and the Tōkyū Den-en-toshi Line/Tōkyū Ōimachi Line over the Tama River.

The Nogawa has a total length of 21 km. Its basin is considered to extend to 69.6 km^{2} including the drainage of its tributaries, the longest of which is the Sen River (Sengawa).

The Nogawa flows through or adjacent to several well known parks including Musashino Park and Nogawa Park in its upper reaches and Kitami Friendship Square in Setagaya.

== Coordinates ==
River source: 35°42′03″N 139°28′31″E

Confluence with Tama River: 35°36′35″N 139°37′35″E

== Access ==
The Nogawa riverside may be accessed from numerous rail stations along its course including

- Kokubunji
- Shin-Koganei
- Tama
- Shibasaki
- Kitami
- Futakotamagawa
