= Komae High School =

High school in Tokyo, Japan

Tokyo Metropolitan Komae High School 東京都立狛江高等学校
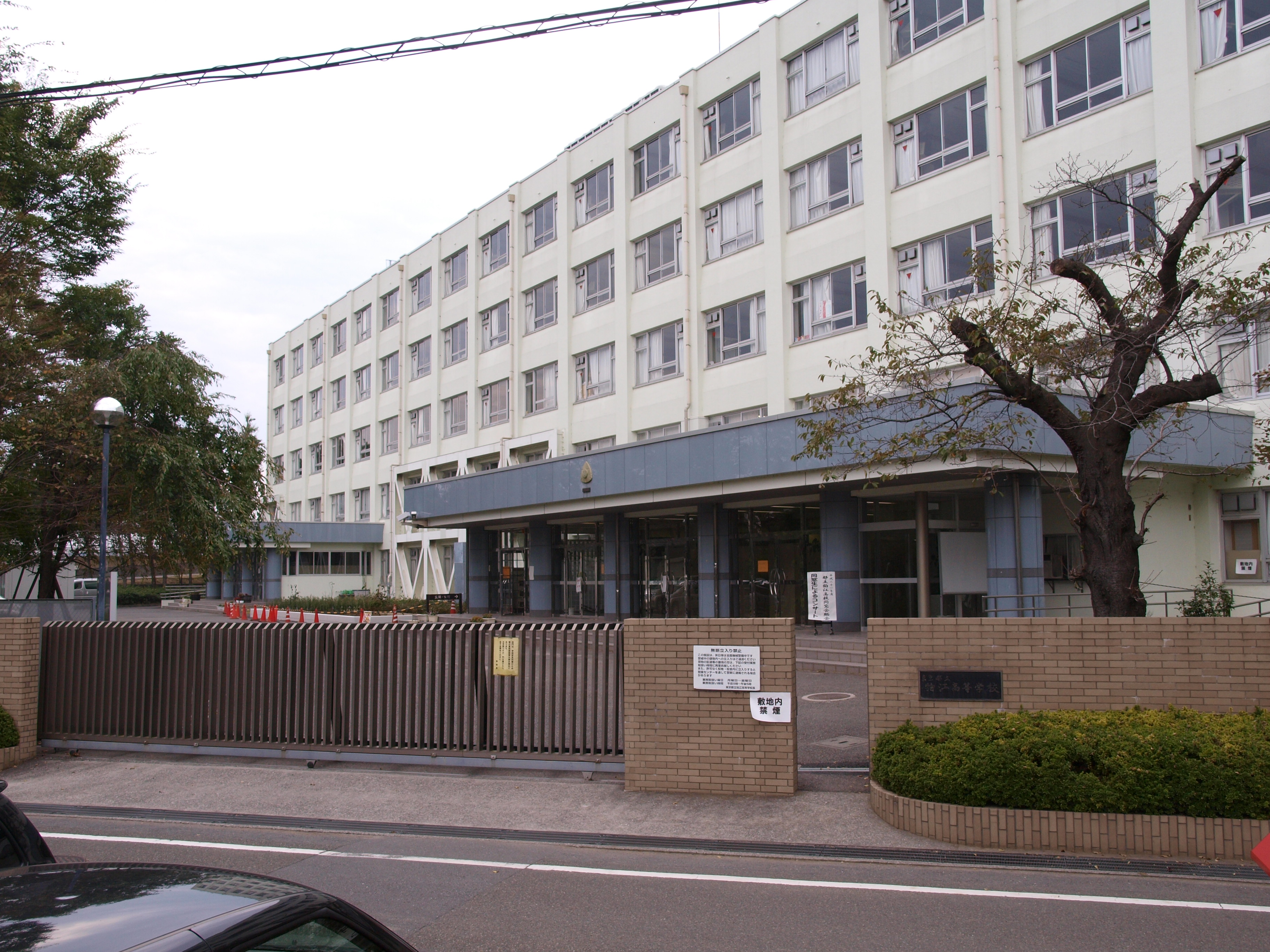

Location
- 3-9-1 Moto-Izumi, Komae, Tokyo; Japan; 35.6274°N 139.571°E

Information
- Type: Mixed Public school
- Established: April 1, 1972
- School district: Komae, Tokyo
- Principal: Tomoe Kijima
- Head of school: Hiroyuki Sugai
- Enrollment: >2000
- Telephone: 03-3489-2241
- Fax: 03-3489-9312
- Website: www.komae-h.metro.tokyo.jp

Tokyo Metropolitan Komae High School (東京都立狛江高等学校, Tōkyō-toritsu Komae Kōtō-gakkō) is a public high school located in Komae, Tokyo, Japan. There are over 2000 male and female students at Komae from grades 10 to 12. The school was established on April 1, 1972. Komae High is a sister school of Kirrawee High School, located in Sydney, Australia. It is overseen by the Tokyo Metropolitan Government Board of Education.

== Access ==
The school is located approximately 3 minutes walk from Izumi-Tamagawa Station on the Odakyū Odawara Line.

== Notable alumni ==
- Hajime Mizoguchi, cellist
