= Komae =

Komae 狛江市
- City
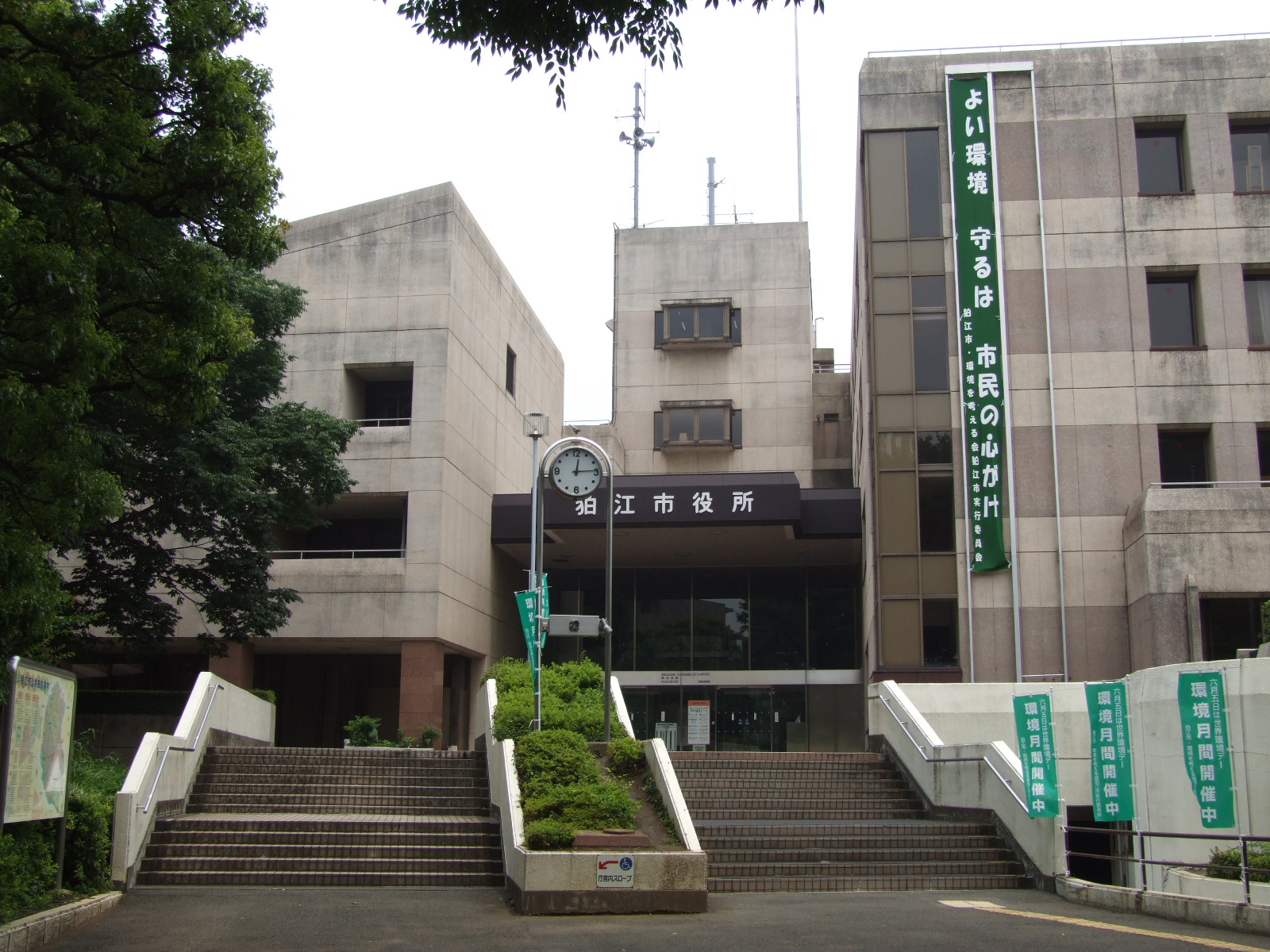
- Komae City Hall

- Flag Seal

- Location of Komae in Tokyo

- Coordinates: 35°38′5.2″N 139°34′43.3″E
- Country: Japan
- Region: Kantō
- Prefecture: Tokyo

Government
  - Mayor: Kunihiko Takahashi (since July 2012)

Area
  - Total: 6.39 km^{2} (2.47 sq mi)

Population (April 2021)
  - Total: 83,218
  - Density: 13,000/km^{2} (33,700/sq mi)
- Time zone: UTC+9 (Japan Standard Time)
- Symbols
  - Tree: Ginkgo biloba
  - Flower: Azalea
- Phone number: 03-3430-1111
- Address: 1-1-5 Izumi-Honcho, Komae-shi, Tokyo 201-8585
- Website: www.city.komae.tokyo.jp

Komae (狛江市, Komae-shi) is a city located in the western portion of the Tokyo Metropolis, Japan. It is one of 30 municipalities in the western portion of Tokyo known as the Tama Area. As of 1 April 2021, the city had an estimated population of 83,218, and a population density of 13,000 persons per km^{2}. The total area of the city is 6.39 square kilometres (2.47 sq mi). It is the smallest administrative city in Tokyo Metropolis both in area and population, and the second smallest in terms of area in the nation.

== Geography ==
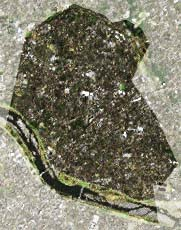
Satellite image of Komae.

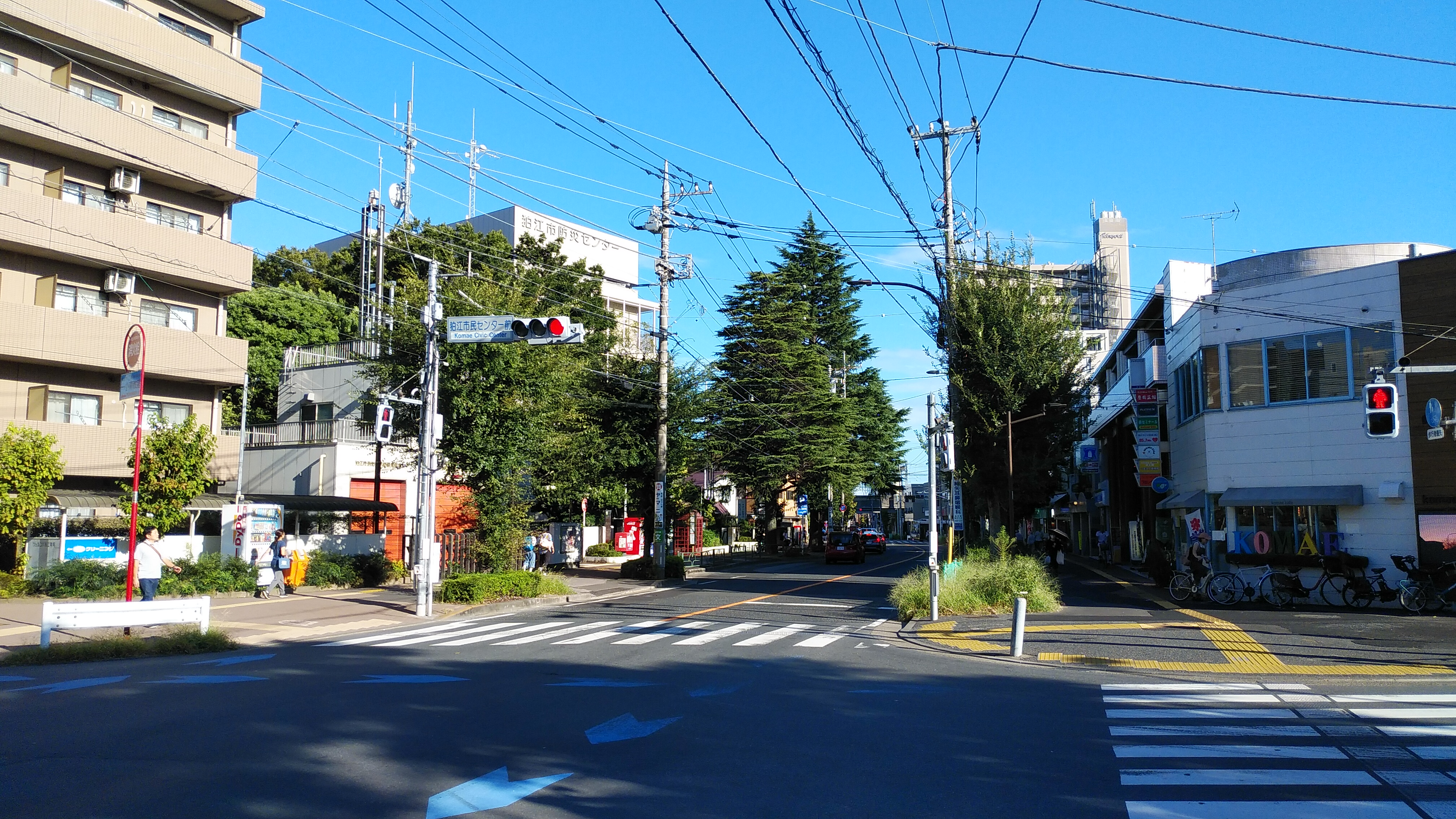
Komae Street Civic Center intersection

Komae is nestled between the Tama River to the southwest, and the much smaller Nogawa River to the north and east which flows near its boundaries with Chōfu city and Setagaya Ward. It is mostly flat. It is a small municipality; its boundaries fit within a circle of 2 km radius centred on the city hall. It is essentially a residential suburb of Tokyo which urbanised rapidly in the 1960s and 1970s, with most of the working population commuting to central Tokyo. There are several neighbourhood shopping areas, mainly around the train stations. The City Hall is located near Komae Station.

=== Surrounding municipalities ===
Kanagawa Prefecture

- Kawasaki

Tokyo Metropolis

- Chōfu
- Setagaya

=== Climate ===
Komae has a humid subtropical climate (Köppen Cfa) characterized by warm summers and cool winters with light to no snowfall. The average annual temperature in Komae is 14.8 °C. The average annual rainfall is 1647 mm with September as the wettest month. The temperatures are highest on average in August, at around 26.0 °C, and lowest in January, at around 3.8 °C.

== Demographics ==
Per Japanese census data, the population of Komae increased rapidly in the 1950s and 1960s and has continued to grow at a slower rate since then.

Historical population
Year	Pop.	±%
1920	2,679	—
1930	3,957	+47.7%
1940	5,657	+43.0%
1950	10,124	+79.0%
1960	25,252	+149.4%
1970	60,297	+138.8%
1980	70,836	+17.5%
1990	74,189	+4.7%
2000	75,711	+2.1%
2010	78,751	+4.0%
2020	84,772	+7.6%

== History ==
The city's name is thought to originate from the word koma, referring to migrants, especially Goguryeo from the Korean Peninsula who settled here around the 5th century AD. Numerous kofun burial mounds are located within the city borders.

The area of present-day Komae was part of ancient Musashi Province. In the post-Meiji Restoration cadastral reform of July 22, 1878, the area became part of Minamitama District in Kanagawa Prefecture. The town of Komae was created on April 1, 1889, with the establishment of the modern municipalities system. Minamitama District was transferred to the administrative control of Tokyo Metropolis on April 1, 1893. Odakyu Railways's Odawara line was constructed through Komae in 1926, linking it with Shinjuku in central Tokyo. Expanding population led to Komae being upgraded to the status of a town in 1952, and to a city on October 1, 1970.

On September 1, 1974, Tama River's levee failed during a typhoon, and 19 houses were destroyed by torrential flooding. The riverbanks have now been strengthened. A small memorial stands at the location of the levee failure.

== Government ==
Komae has a mayor-council form of government with a directly elected mayor and a unicameral city council of 26 members. The current mayor is Kunihiko Takahashi, an independent heading a coalition of the Democratic Party of Japan with the Liberal Democratic Party of Japan and the Komeito, which ousted long-term Japanese Communist Party mayor Yutaka Yano in 2012. Komae, together with the city of Chōfu, contributes three members to the Tokyo Metropolitan Assembly. In terms of national politics, the city is part of Tokyo 26th district of the lower house of the Diet of Japan.

== Education ==
The one public high school, Komae High School, is operated by the Tokyo Metropolitan Government Board of Education.

Komae has six public elementary schools and four junior high schools schools operated by the city.

Public junior high schools:

- Komae No. 1 (狛江第一中学校)
- Komae No. 2 (狛江第二中学校)
- Komae No. 3 (狛江第三中学校)
- Komae No. 4 (狛江第四中学校)

Public elementary schools:

- Izumi (和泉小学校)
- Komae No. 1 (狛江第一小学校)
- Komae No. 3 (狛江第三小学校)
- Komae No. 5 (狛江第五小学校)
- Komae No. 6 (狛江第六小学校)
- Midorino (緑野小学校)

== Transportation ==
=== Railway ===
Odakyu Electric Railway – Odakyū Odawara Line

- Komae - Izumi-Tamagawa

(Some areas in the north of the city have better access to Keiō Line stations in neighbouring Chōfu city.)

=== Highway ===
- Komae is not served by any national highways or expressways.

== Local attractions ==
Annual events in Komae include a raft-race on Tama River every July, and a city fair in mid-November.

The town has a group of festival mascots called Komarangers; their purpose is to cheer up the citizens of the town. They come in five colors: red, blue, green, yellow, and pink.

== Notable people from Komae ==
- Sadao Araki. Army general and pre-war rightwing politician
- Sumire Haruno. Takarazuka actress
- Manamo Miyata, author
