= Kitami Station (Tokyo) =

Railway station in Tokyo, Japan

Coordinates: 35.6366°N 139.5871°E

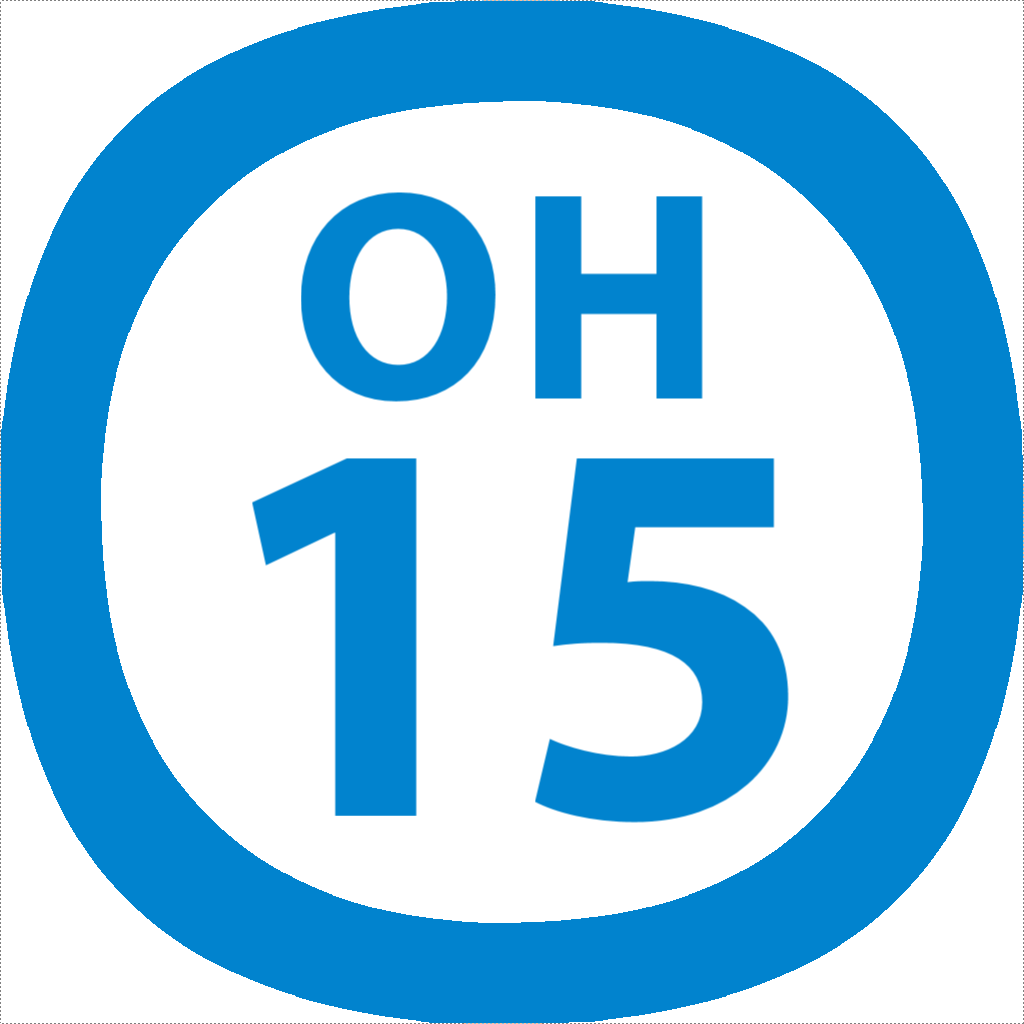
Kitami Station 喜多見駅

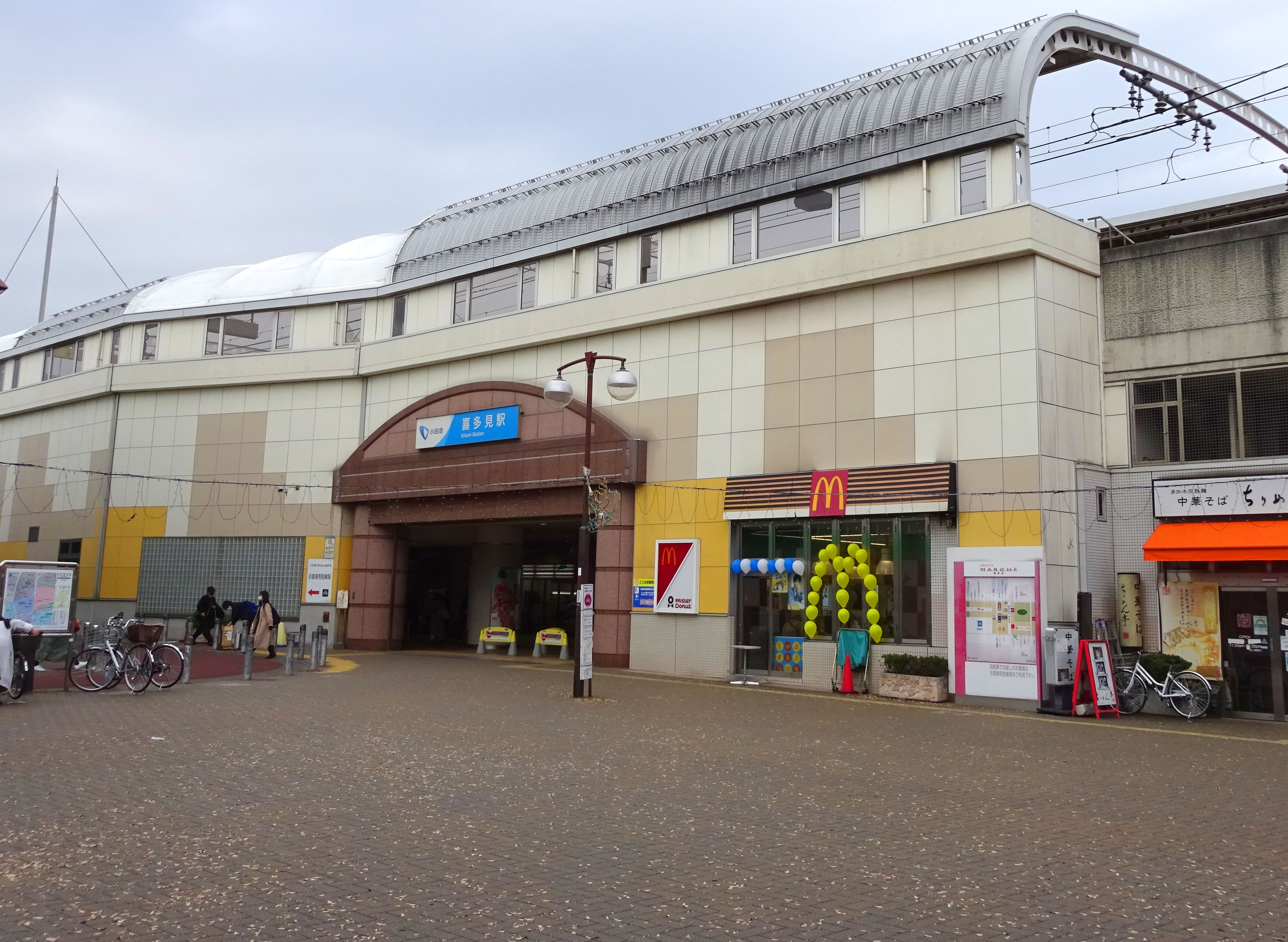
- Kitami Station as of November 21st, 2021

General information
- Location: Setagaya, Tokyo; Japan
- Operator: Odakyu Electric Railway
- Line: Odakyu Odawara Line

Other information
- Station code: OH15

History
- Opened: 1 April 1927; 99 years ago

Passengers
- FY2020: 34,207

Services
Preceding station	Odakyu	Following station
Komae towards Odawara	Odawara Line Semi Express Local	Seijōgakuen-Mae towards Shinjuku or Yoyogi-Uehara
Location

Kitami Station (喜多見駅; Kitami-eki) is a minor stop on the Odakyu Electric Railway Odawara Line straddling the border between Setagaya Ward and Komae City in Tokyo, Japan. It is the 14th station, about 12.7 km (7.9 mi), from Shinjuku Station. It was used by an average of about 32,000 passengers daily in 2005. It is serviced by local service trains; all other trains bypass the station.

== Layout ==
The new station consists of two elevated side platforms and four tracks. Express trains typically bypass the station on the two innermost tracks while local trains typically stop at the station on the two outermost tracks. Kitami station's facilities are located on the ground floor. There are commercial and food establishments under the train tracks on either side of the concourse.

== History ==
Kitami Station was opened on 1 April 1927.

Throughout the 1990s it was extensively redeveloped as part of the Odakyu Line's track doubling project. Previous to the redevelopment, the platforms were on ground level and linked by an overhead bridge.

Station numbering was introduced in January 2014 with Kitami being assigned station number OH15.

== Surroundings ==
The station lies in a residential area. There is a koban immediately outside the North Exit and a supermarket to the south. A neighbourhood shopping street stretches south. The Odakyu Railway's Kitami train depot lies to the east, alongside the Nogawa river.

There is a Catholic church to the north of the station. It was built in the early 20th century by Tsurumatsu Toshimitsu, the founder of Odakyu, for his daughter.

The name of the area, Kitami, is thought to originate from an ancient Ainu word meaning "flat, wooded place".
