= Meiji Shrine Inner Garden =

Public garden in Shibuya, Tokyo Japan

Coordinates: 35°40′22″N 139°42′01″E

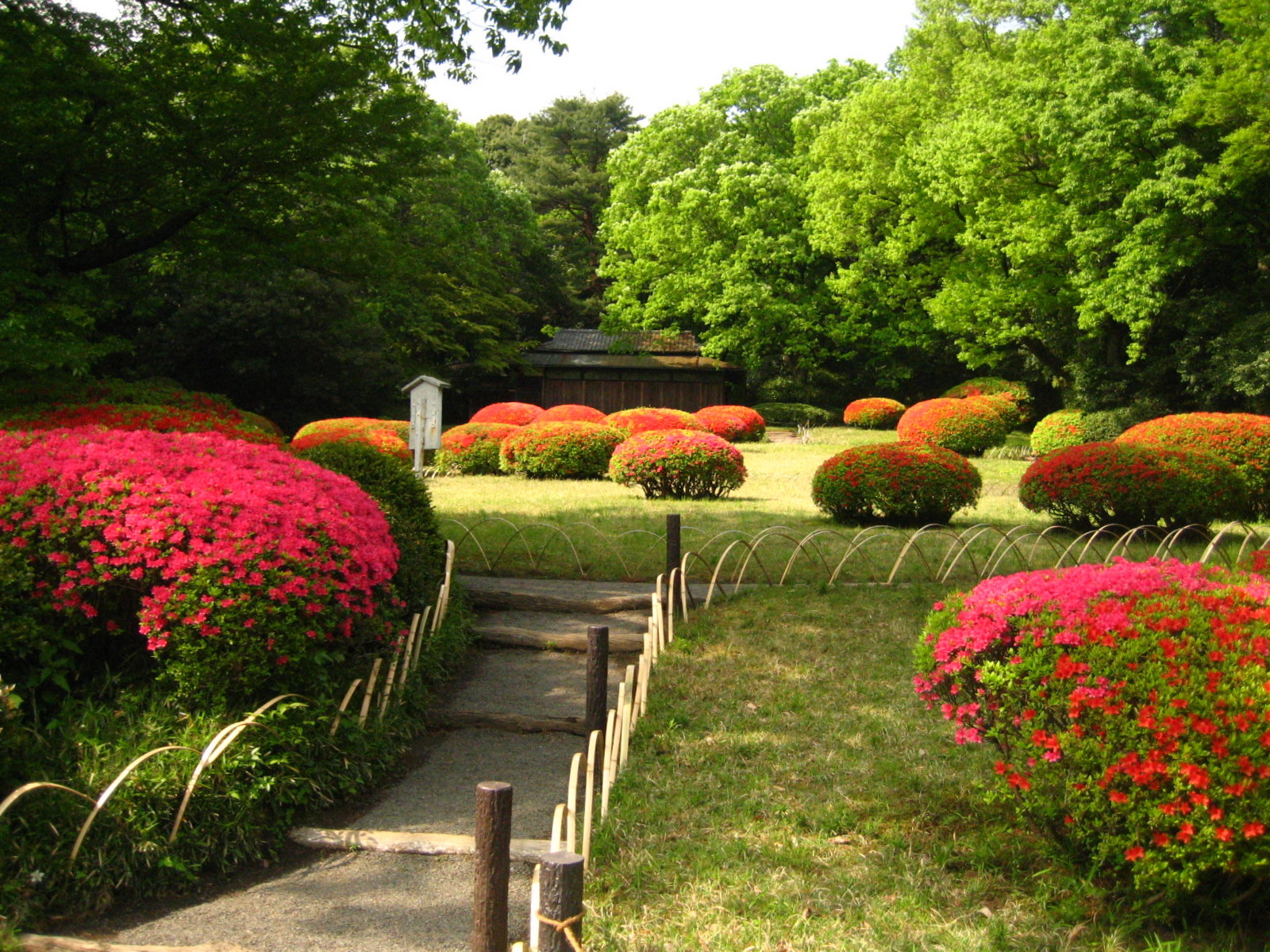
Flowers near the Nan-Chi, (South Pond).

The Meiji Shrine Inner Garden (明治神宮御苑, Meiji Jingū Gyoen) or Yoyogi Gyoen is a public garden adjacent to Meiji Shrine and Yoyogi Park in Shibuya, Tokyo. The garden was once part of the suburban residences of Katō Kiyomasa and later the Ii clan during the Edo period. During the Meiji period, the garden came under the supervision of the Imperial Household Agency and named Yoyogi Gyoen (Yoyogi Imperial Garden) and was frequently visited by Emperor Meiji and Empress Shōken.

The garden contains a tea house, an arbour, a fishing stand, and an iris garden. It has an area of 83,000 square meters and is open to the public throughout the year. The tea house (Kakuun-tei) was originally built in 1900 as a rest house for Empress Shōken as a gift from Emperor Meiji. Burned down during World War II air raids, it was reconstructed in 1958.

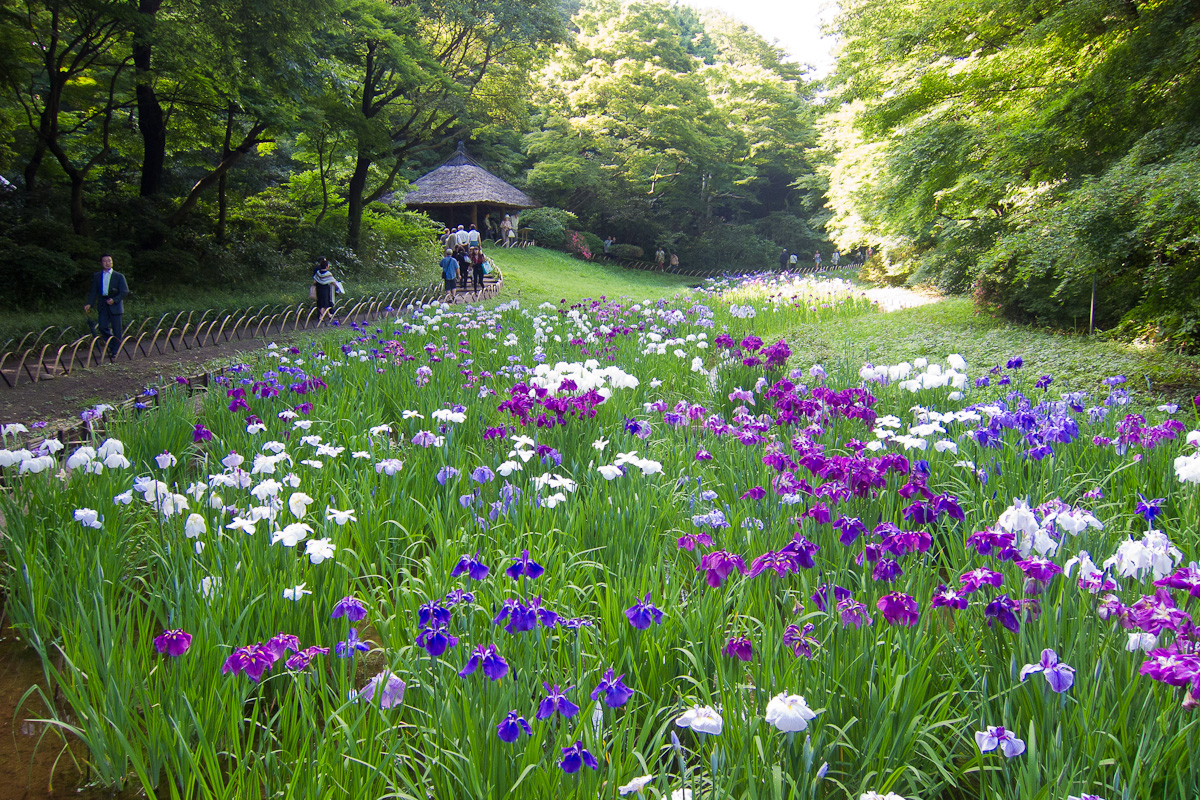
Iris garden in Meiji Jingū Gyoen.

During the Edo period, the iris garden area had been used to teach children about rice cultivation. In 1893, Emperor Meiji had it converted into an iris garden for the pleasure of Empress Shōken.
