= Norma Field =

American academic

Norma M. Field is an author and emeritus professor of East Asian studies at the University of Chicago. She has taught Premodern Japanese Poetry and Prose, Premodern Japanese Language, and Gender Studies as relating to Japanese women.

Her areas of expertise include Japanese literature, both classical and modern; feminism; and translation.

Field was born in Tokyo, Japan, shortly after the end of World War II to an American serviceman father and his Japanese wife. She was raised in Tokyo and attended school in the Washington Heights District. At age 10, she transferred to the American School in Japan, where she stayed through the end of high school. After graduation, she moved to America, and received a BA from Pitzer College in European Studies.

Field has a master's degree from Indiana University and a Ph.D. from Princeton University. She was awarded a Guggenheim Fellowship in 1988.

== Awards ==
- American Book Award, 1992, for In the Realm of a Dying Emperor: Japan at Century's End

== Selected publications ==
- The Splendor of Longing in the Tale of the Genji (1987)
- In the Realm of a Dying Emperor: A Portrait of Japan at Century's End (1993)
- From My Grandmother's Bedside: Sketches of Postwar Tokyo (1997)
