= Washington Heights (Tokyo) =

US Armed Forces housing complex in Tokyo

Coordinates: 35.67021534°N 139.70022564°E

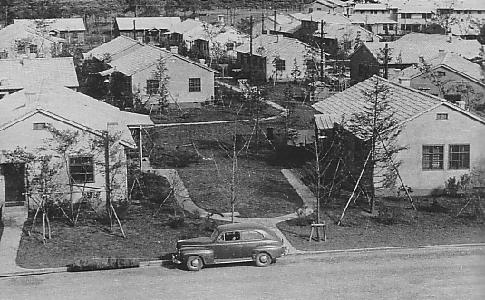
Washington Heights, 1947

Washington Heights was a United States Armed Forces housing complex located in Shibuya, Tokyo, during the occupation of Japan by Allied forces. Constructed in 1946, it remained in operation until 1964, by which point all land had been returned to Japanese control. Today, the site encompasses Yoyogi Park, Yoyogi National Gymnasium, the NHK Broadcasting Center, and other facilities. This installation has a marker for the first powered flight in Japan.

== Military period ==
Covering an area of 924,000 m^{2} (228 acres), Washington Heights was home to 827 housing units for United States Army Air Force and, later, Air Force families. It also hosted support facilities, including schools, churches, theaters, shops, and officers' clubs. Japanese citizens were not permitted to enter the area, which was fenced in with multiple gates. Washington Heights was predominantly a middle-class area, although much of Tokyo had been devastated by firebombing during the war.

Before the surrender of Japan, the area was used as a parade ground by the Imperial Japanese Army. The U.S. military ordered the construction of the Washington Heights complex by the Japanese government, and maintained control of it after the signing of the Treaty of San Francisco. Although the treaty returned Japanese sovereignty in late April 1952, military forces would remain, including those housed at Washington Heights. This resulted in protests from Japanese university students in early May, but expected attacks on the housing complex never materialized.

The Treaty of Mutual Cooperation and Security between the United States and Japan, signed in 1960, determined that Washington Heights would remain in operation. The following year, though, the land was deemed necessary for construction of facilities connected with the 1964 Summer Olympics. The transfer was completed in 1964, with the Japanese government bearing the full amount of relocation expenses for U.S. military families moving to Chofu Airport.

== Olympics and later years ==
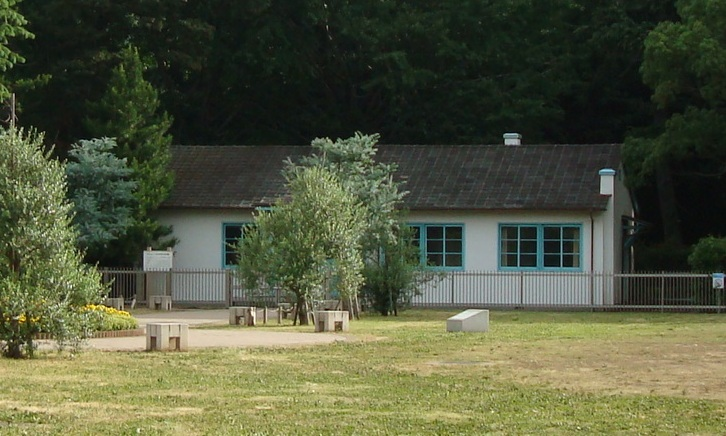
Surviving military housing in Yoyogi Park, 2011

A number of the former military barracks were used as athlete housing during the Games. Other athletes were housed in a newly constructed facility that later became the National Olympics Memorial Youth Center. After the Olympics, nearly all the military housing was razed, except for one house in Yoyogi Park, which had been used by the Dutch Olympic team.

== Noted individuals ==
- Johnny Kitagawa, created Japan's first boy band from youths he found playing in Washington Heights in 1962
- Norma Field, attended school in Washington Heights as a child
- Lois Lowry, acclaimed American writer, author of The Giver, where she received her inspiration for the book from childhood memories of sneaking out of the base and exploring the neighboring Shibuya district.
- W. Neal Burnette, American medical scientist (recombinant vaccines and Western Blotting) was a high school military dependent 1957-1960.
