= Yoyogi Park =

Park in Shibuya, Tokyo, Japan

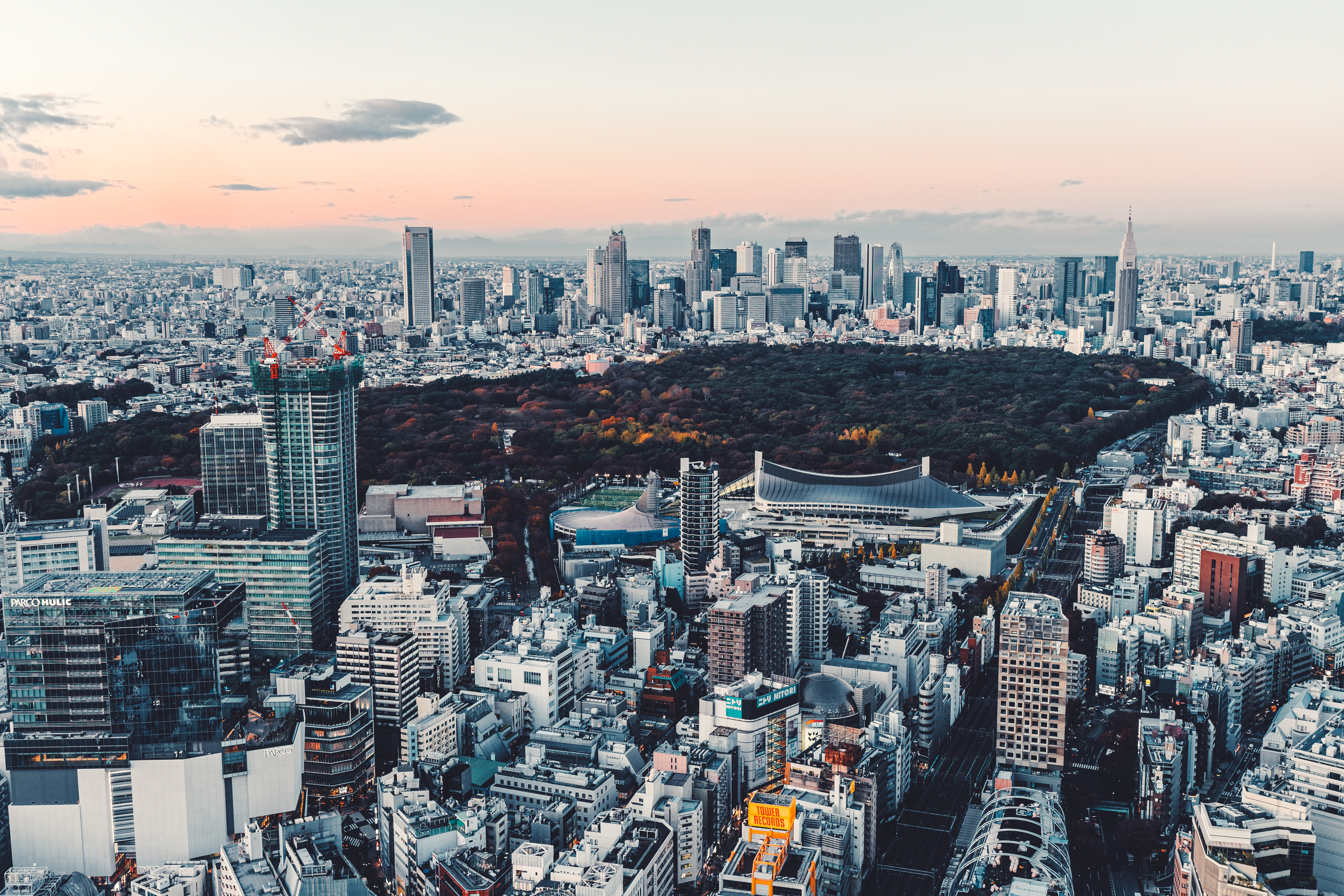
- Interactive map of Yoyogi Park
- Location: Shibuya, Tokyo, Japan
- Coordinates: 35.671975°N 139.69768536°E
- Area: 54.1 ha (134 acres)
- Created: 1967
- Public transit: Harajuku Station, Yoyogi-Koen Station, Meiji-jingumae Station

Yoyogi Park (代々木公園, Yoyogi kōen) is a park in Shibuya, Tokyo, Japan. It is located adjacent to Harajuku Station and Meiji Shrine in Yoyogikamizonochō. The park is a popular Tokyo destination, especially on Sundays when it is used as a gathering place for Japanese rock music fans, jugglers, comedians, martial arts clubs, cosplayers and other subculture and hobby groups. In spring, thousands of people visit the park to enjoy the cherry blossom during hanami. The landscaped park has picnic areas, bike paths, cycle rentals, public sport courts, and a dog run.

== History ==
Yoyogi Park stands on the site from where the first successful powered aircraft flight in Japan took place by Captain Yoshitoshi Tokugawa on 19 December 1910. The area later became an army parade ground and training area, including gun training, which scared the famous dog Hachikō. From September 1945, the site became a U.S. officers housing area known as Washington Heights during the Allied occupation of Japan.

The area was used for the 1964 Summer Olympics housing the main Olympic Village and the Yoyogi National Gymnasium. The distinctive building, which was designed by Kenzo Tange, hosted swimming and diving, with an annex for basketball.

In 1967 most of the area north of the gymnasium complex and south of Meiji Shrine was absorbed by Yoyogi Park.

Tokyo's failed bid to host the 2016 Summer Olympics included a proposal to redevelop Yoyogi Park. A new volleyball arena was to be built west of the Yoyogi National Gymnasium. It would have replaced a small stadium with a football and athletics arena. Yoyogi National Gymnasium later served as the venue for handball events during the 2020 Summer Olympics.

=== 2014 dengue fever cases ===
In 2014, Tokyo experienced one of its worst dengue fever outbreaks in 100 years and the first recorded cases in 70 years, with nearly 200 confirmed cases. The first case was reported on August 27, 2014. Using gene sequencing techniques, scientists determined that the outbreak originated in Yoyogi Park. Dozens of visitors to the area contracted the disease, leading to the park's closure on September 4. No further cases were discovered after September 18, and the park re-opened to the public on October 31.

== Gallery ==
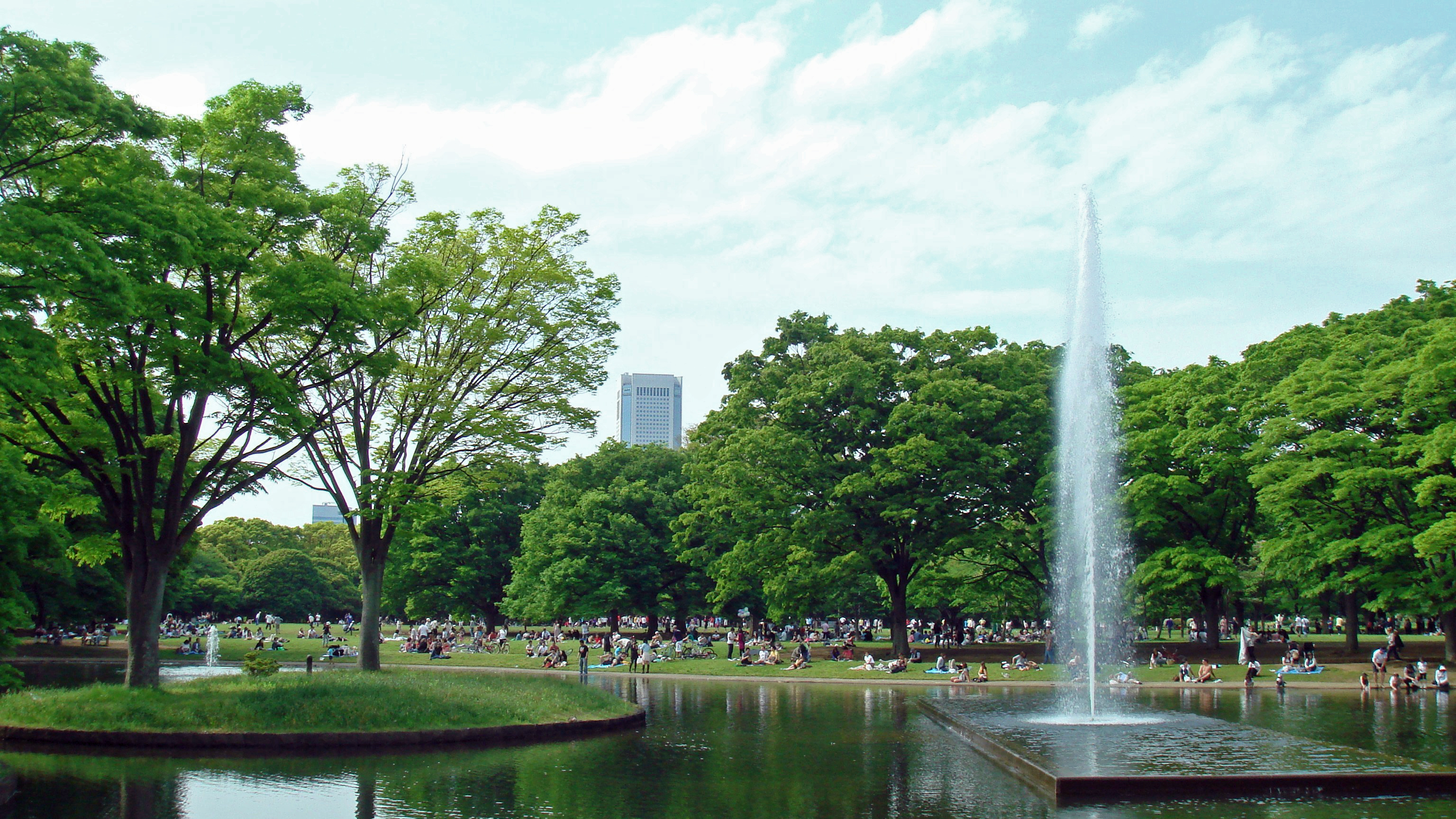
Yoyogi Park fountain

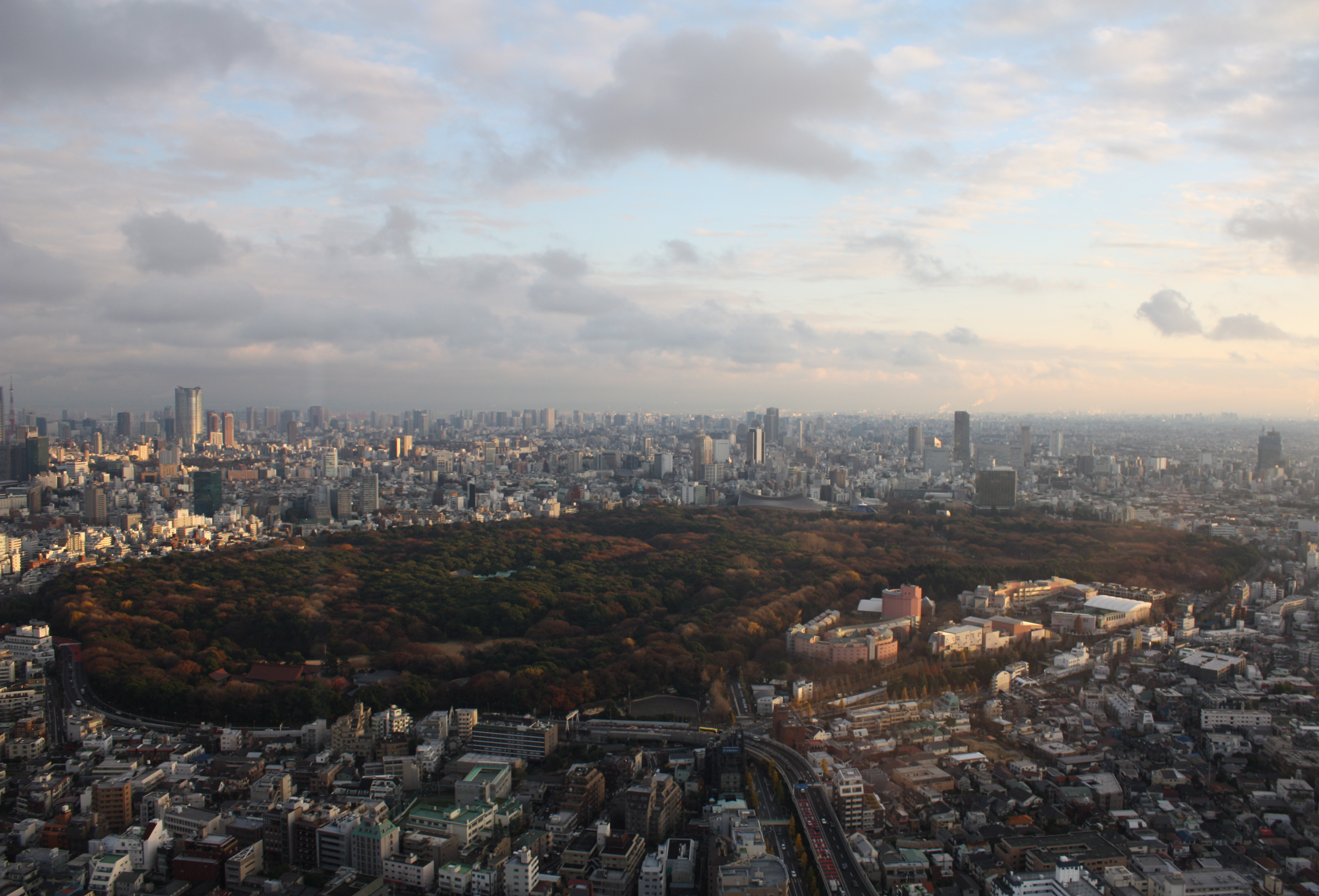
Yoyogi Park and Meiji Shrine as seen from above, 2008

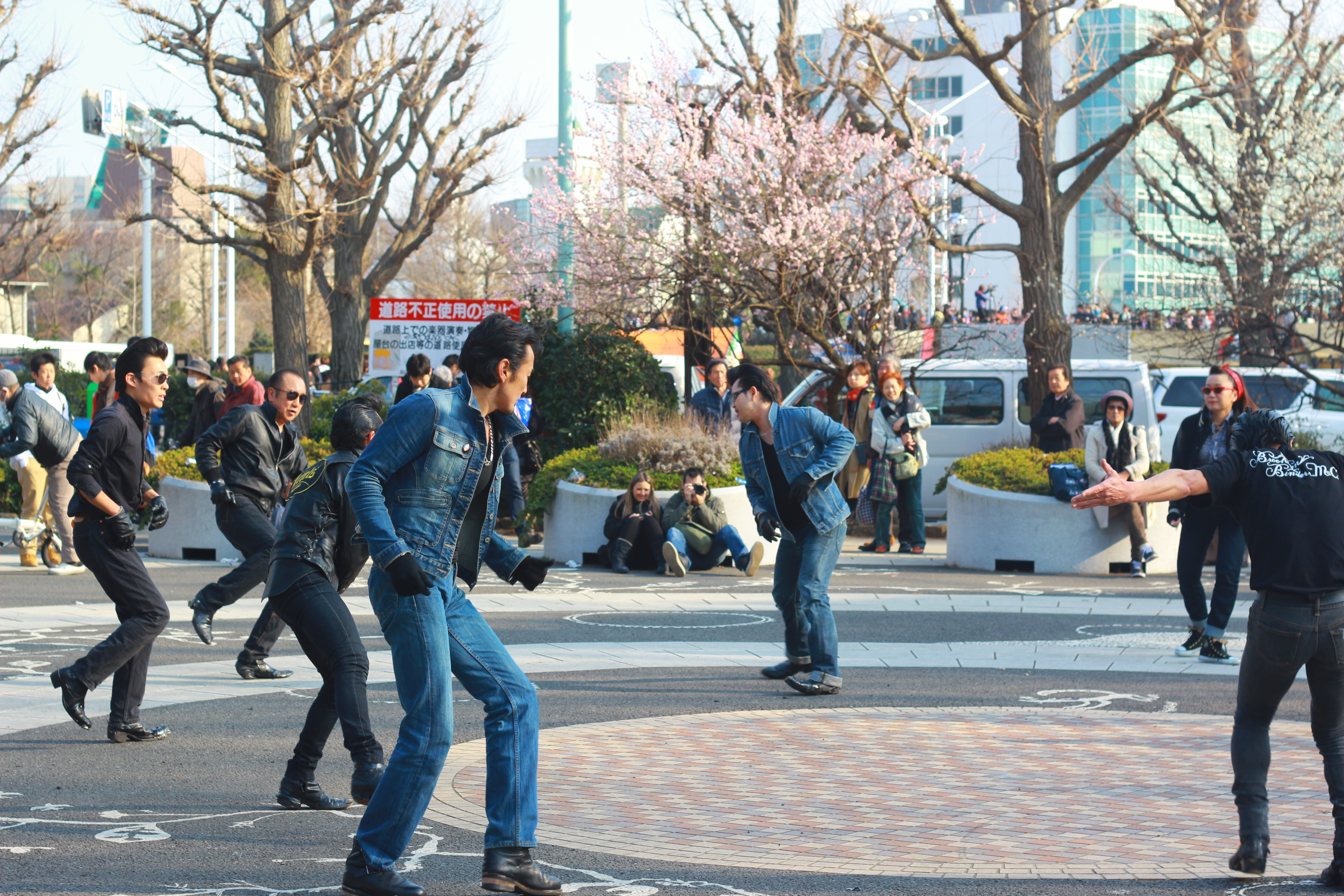
Yoyogi's rockabillies dancing in the park on a Sunday in March 2014

Several scenes in the park, 2024

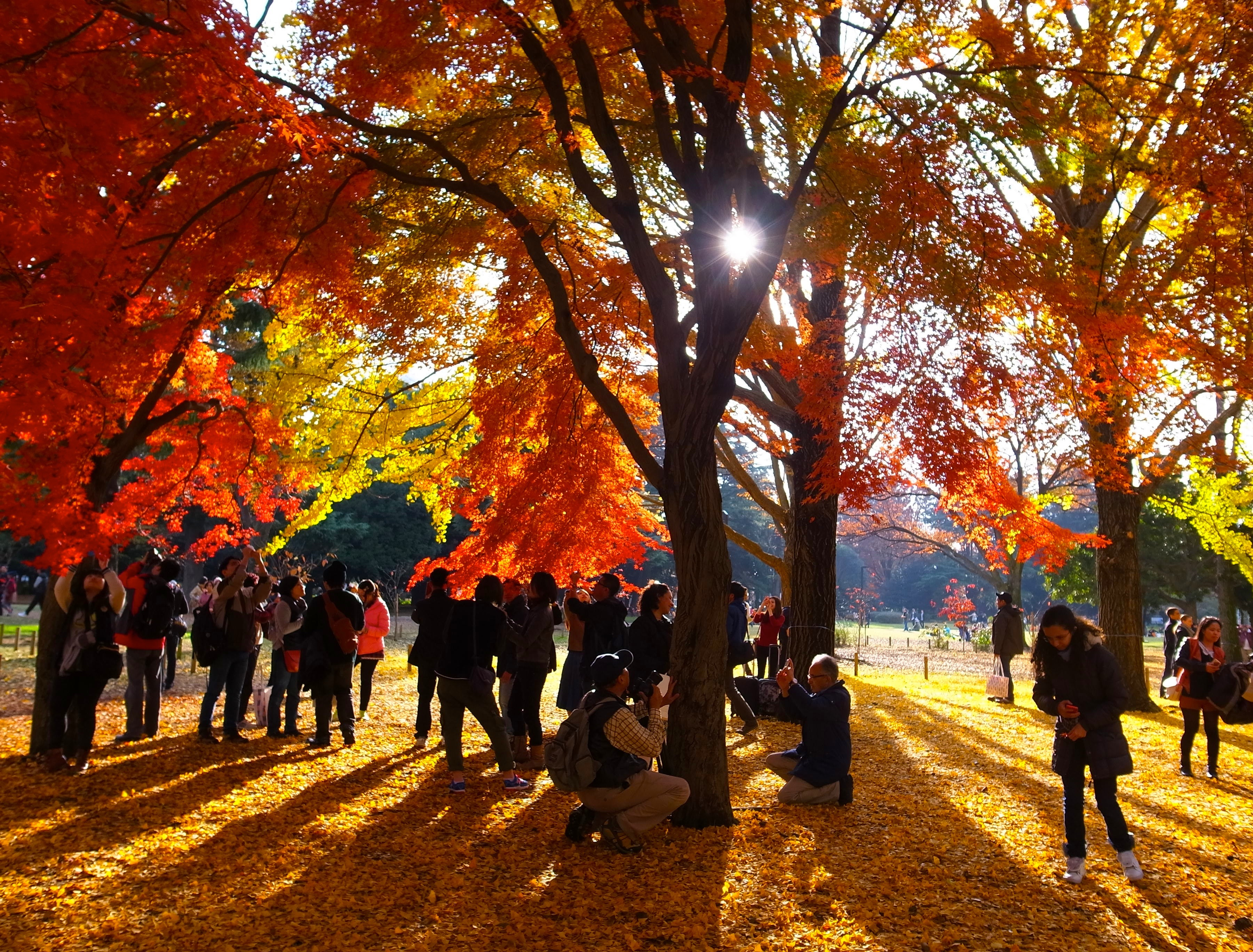
Autumn in Yoyogi Park, November 2014
