= Meiji Shrine =

Shinto shrine in Tokyo, Japan

- 明治神宮
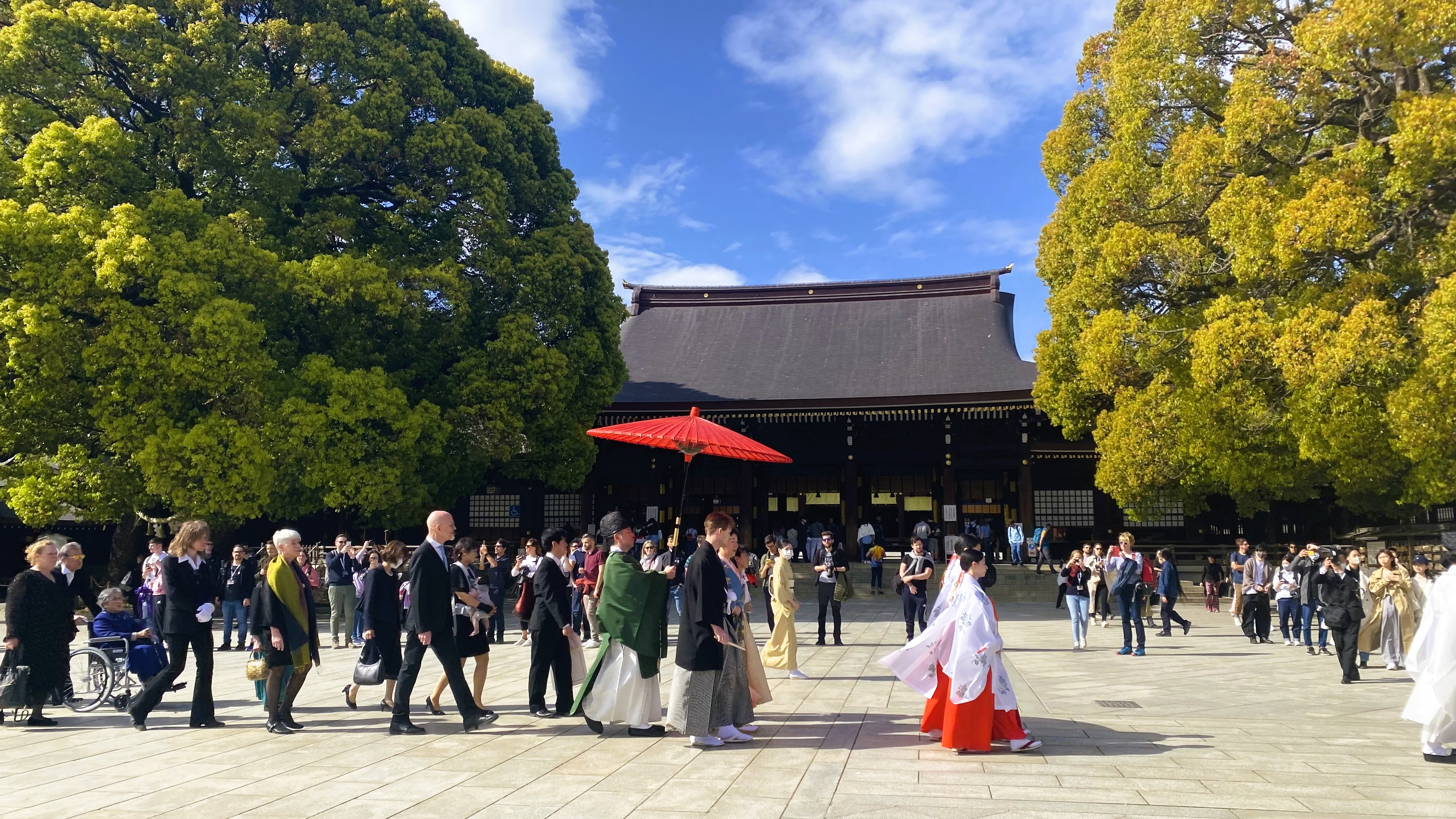
- Meiji Jingu Shrine Main Hall in 2023

- Location within Japan

Religion
- Affiliation: Shinto
- Deity: Emperor Meiji; Empress Shoken
- Type: Imperial Shrine

Location
- Location: 1-1, Kamizono-chō, Yoyogi, Shibuya, Tokyo 151-0053
- Interactive map of Meiji Shrine
- Coordinates: 35°40′34″N 139°41′57″E

Architecture
- Established: November 1, 1920

Website
- www.meijijingu.or.jp/english/

Meiji Shrine (明治神宮, Meiji Jingū) is a Shinto shrine in Shibuya, Tokyo, that is dedicated to the deified spirits of Emperor Meiji and his wife, Empress Shōken. The shrine does not contain the emperor's grave, which is located at Fushimi-momoyama, south of Kyoto.

== History ==
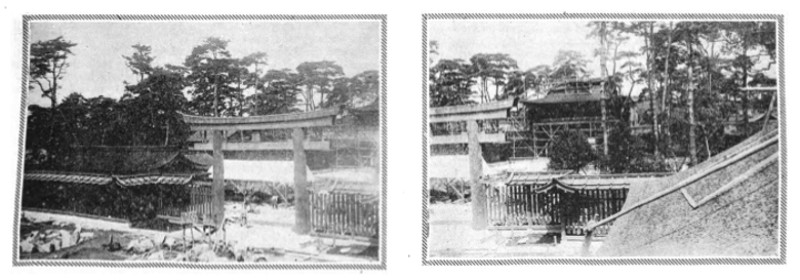
Meiji under construction in 1920

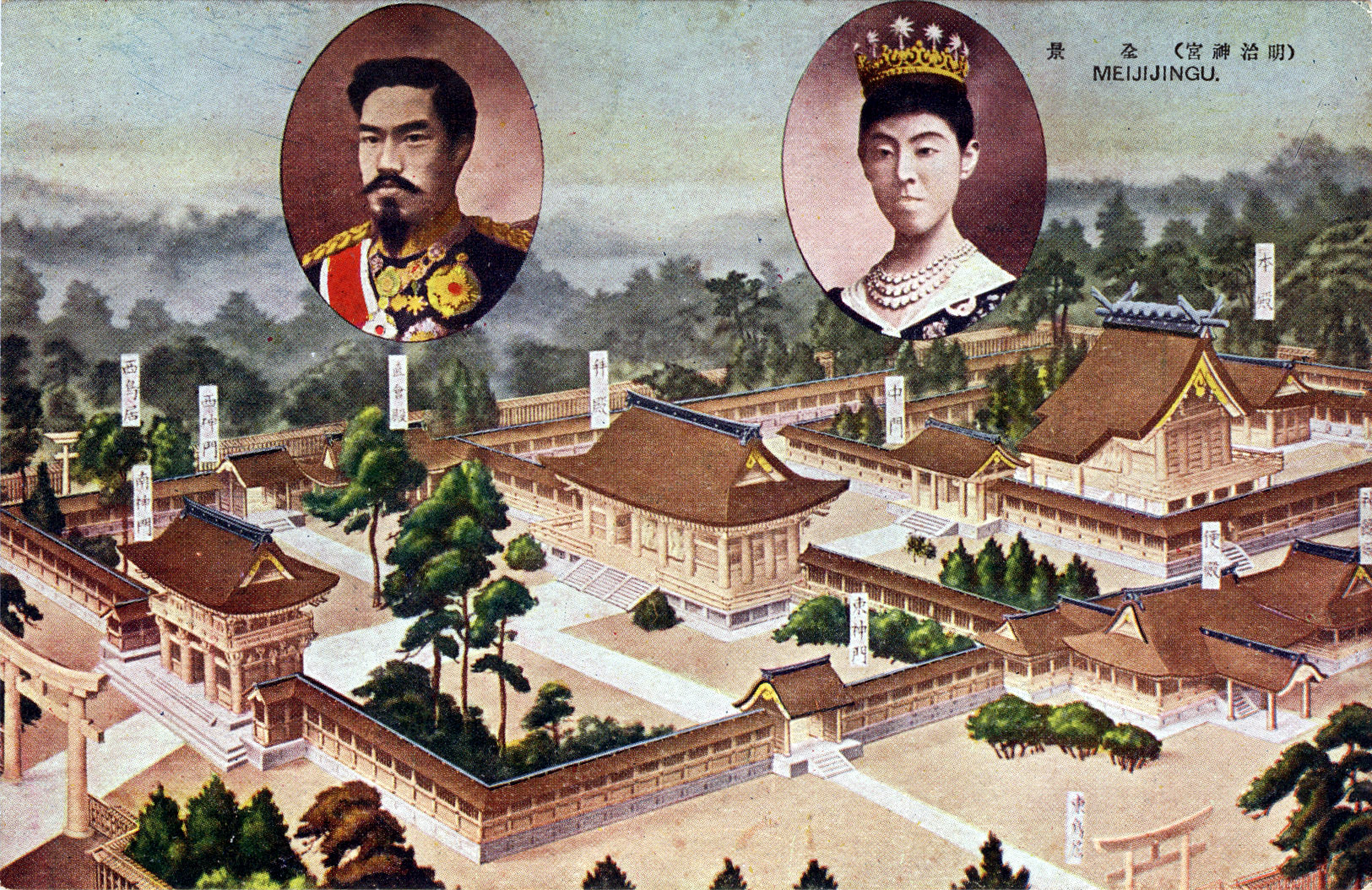
Emperor Meiji and Empress Shoken, aerial view of Meiji Jingu, c. 1926

After the emperor's death in 1912, the Japanese Diet passed a resolution to commemorate his role in the Meiji Restoration. An iris garden in an area of Tokyo where Emperor Meiji and Empress Shōken had been known to visit was chosen as the building's location. Construction began in 1915 under Itō Chūta, and the shrine was built in the traditional nagare-zukuri style, using primarily Japanese cypress and copper. The building of the shrine was a national project, mobilizing youth groups and other civic associations from throughout Japan, who contributed labor and funding. The main timbers came from Kiso in Nagano, and Alishan in Taiwan, then a Japanese territory, with materials being utilized from every Japanese prefecture, including Karafuto, Korea, Kwantung, and Taiwan. It was estimated that the cost of the construction was ¥5,219,000 in 1920 (approximately US$26 million today), about a quarter of the actual cost due to the donated materials and labor.

It was formally dedicated on November 3, 1920, completed in 1921, and its grounds officially finished by 1926. The interior volume of the shrine complex when originally built was 650 tsubo. Until 1946, the Meiji Shrine was officially designated one of the Kanpei-taisha (官幣大社), meaning that it stood in the first rank of government-supported shrines.

The original building was destroyed during the Tokyo air raids of World War II. The present iteration of the shrine was funded through a public fund raising effort and completed in October 1958.

Meiji Shrine has been visited by numerous foreign politicians, including United States President George W. Bush, United States Secretary of State Hillary Clinton, and German Foreign Minister Guido Westerwelle.

== Shrine complex ==
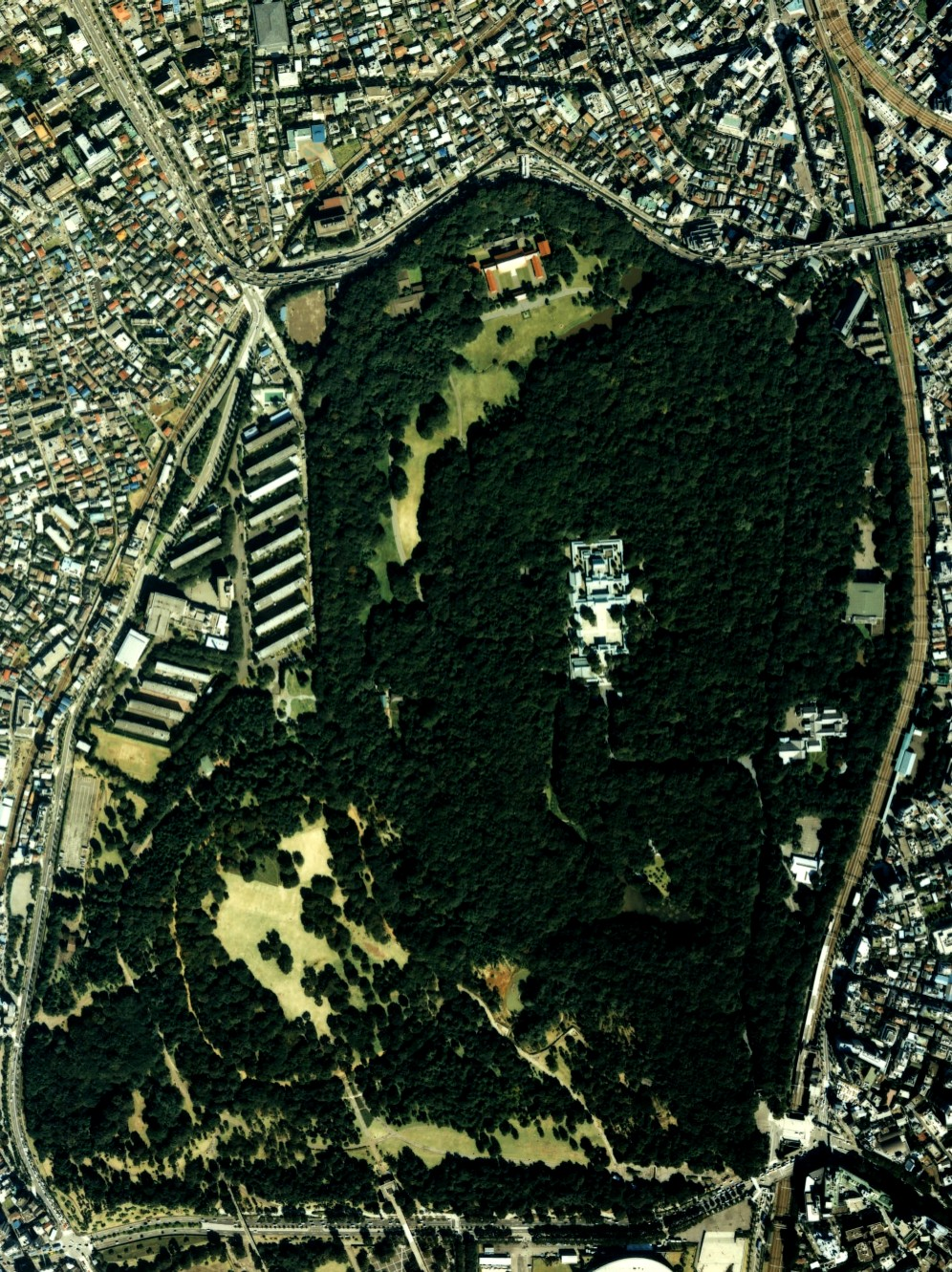
An aerial photograph of Meiji Shrine Naien and Yoyogi Park (1989)

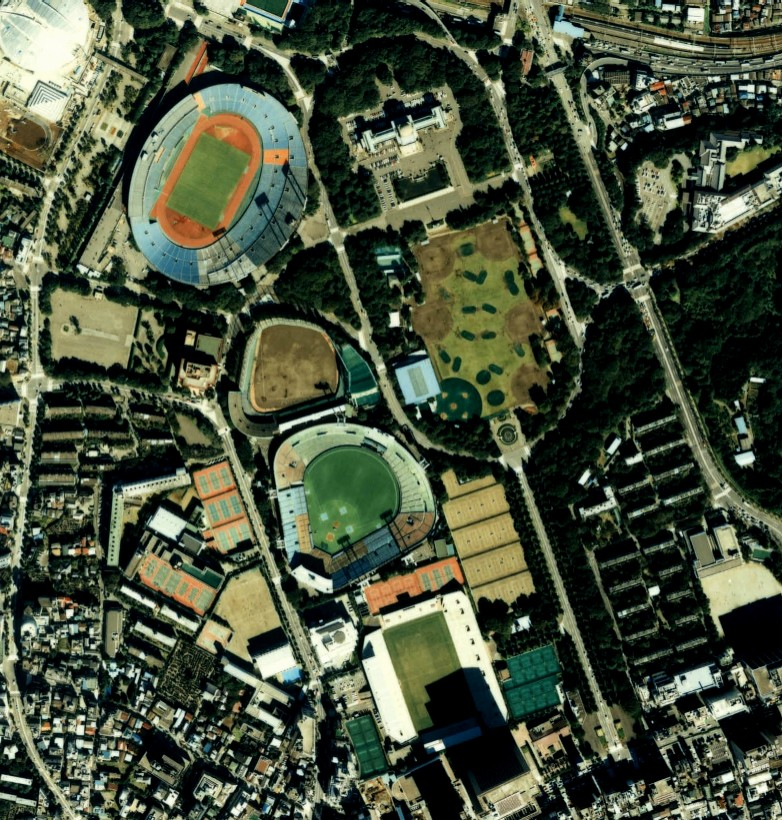
An aerial photograph of Meiji Shrine Gaien (1989)

Meiji Shrine is located in a forest that covers an area of 70 hectares (170 acres). This area is covered by an evergreen forest that consists of 120,000 trees of 365 different species, which were donated by people from all parts of Japan when the shrine was established. The forest is visited by many as a recreation and relaxation area in the center of Tokyo. The entrance to the shrine complex leads through the Jingu Bashi bridge. Meiji Shrine is adjacent to Yoyogi Park which together is a large forested area. The entrances open at sunrise and close at sunset.

The shrine itself is composed of two major areas:

=== Naien ===
The Naien is the inner precinct, which is centered on the shrine buildings and includes a treasure museum that houses articles of the Emperor and Empress. The treasure museum is built in the Azekurazukuri style.

=== Gaien ===
The Gaien is the outer precinct, which includes the Meiji Memorial Picture Gallery that houses a collection of 80 large murals illustrative of the events in the lives of the Emperor and his consort. It also includes a variety of sports facilities, including the national stadiums (Meiji Jingu Gaien Stadium, National Stadium, and the newer National Stadium), and the Meiji Memorial Hall (Meiji Kinenkan), which was originally used for governmental meetings, including discussions surrounding the drafting of the Meiji Constitution in the late 19th century. Today it is used for Shinto weddings as well as meeting room rental and restaurant services.

In February 2023, the Tokyo Metropolitan Government approved a plan to develop 28.4 hectares of Meiji Jingu Gaien. A new sports stadium, hotel and three skyscrapers are planned for the site. In September 2023, the International Council on Monuments and Sites (ICOMOS), a UNESCO advisory body, warned of 'irreversible destruction of cultural heritage' if the project, which will result in the loss of 3,000 trees and open park space, is allowed to be completed.

== Festivals ==
Several festivals are held at the shrine per year. Some festivals are held annually. The exhibitions range from ice carving, shodoten (calligraphy winners's works), bonsai, Suiseki Masterpieces, Memory Dolls, Chrysanthemums, Dahlia and exhibitions at the Treasure Museum Annex.

- A ring-entering ceremony by a Yokozuna, called Dezuiri (手数入り), is performed at the shrine in January (usually around January 5–7) and during the Autumn Festival. Also newly promoted Yokozuna usually perform their first ring-entering ceremony here.
- Autumn Grand Festival (From October 31 to November 3)
  - October 31 - Autumn Grand Festival Bugaku at the main shrine building
  - November 1 - Autumn Grand Festival: Enshrinement Anniversary Ceremony, Afternoon Ceremony
  - November 2 - Autumn Grand Festival Morning Ceremony
  - November 3 - Autumn Grand Festival Anniversary of Emperor Meiji's Birthday

Festival	Description	Date
Oharae	Great purification (to cast out sins and impurities)	December 31, 2020 (Thursday)
Joyasai	Year-end ritual	December 31, 2020 (Thursday)
Saitaisai	New Year's Day ritual	January 1, 2021 (Friday, National Holiday)
Shodoten	Exhibition of winners' works in the calligraphy competition for elementary and junior high school students	from January 5, 2021 (Tuesday) to January 30, 2021 (Saturday)
Kigensai	National Foundation Day Festival	February 11, 2021 (Thursday, National Holiday)
Kinen-sai	Prayer Ceremony for Agricultural Fertility	February 17, 2021 (Wednesday)
Tenchosai	Celebration of the current Emperor's birthday	February 23, 2021 (Tuesday, National Holiday)
Shoken-Kotaigo-Sai	Empress Shoken Memorial Ceremony (to remember the virtues of Empress Shoken)	April 11, 2021 (Sunday)

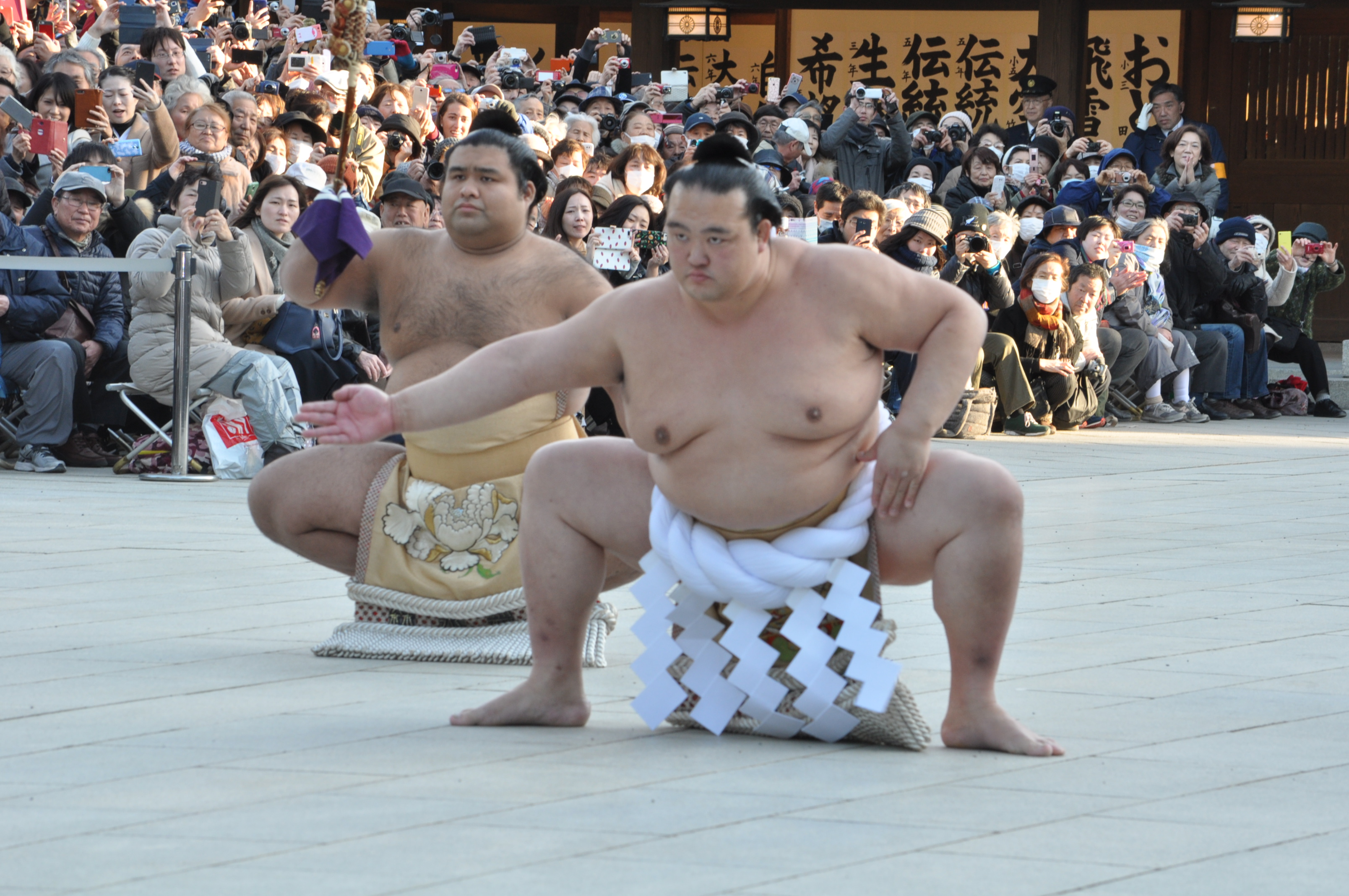
Kisenosato performing his first yokozuna dohyō-iri at the Meiji Shrine

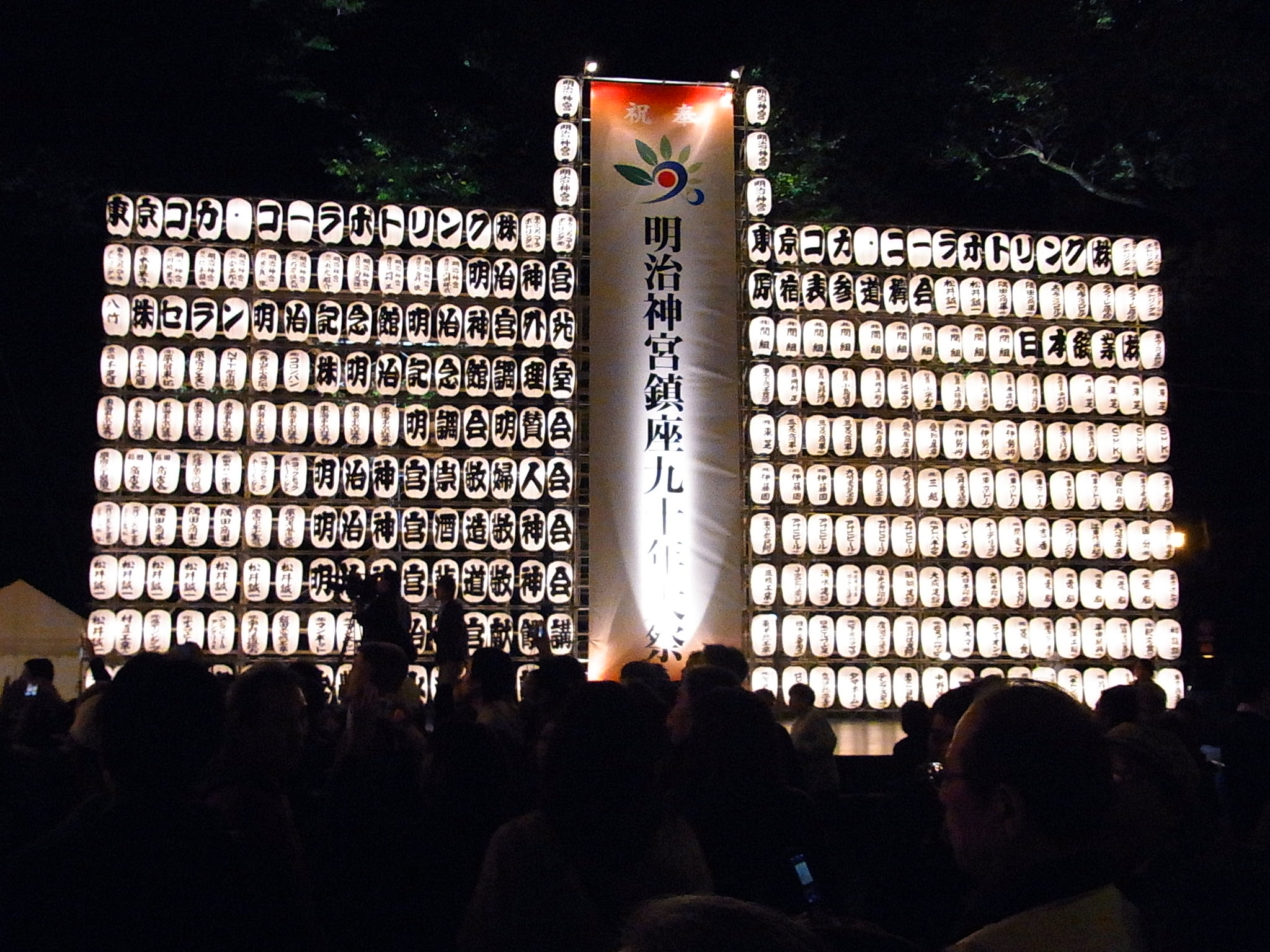
In front of Ichino Torii (photographed on October 31, 2010)

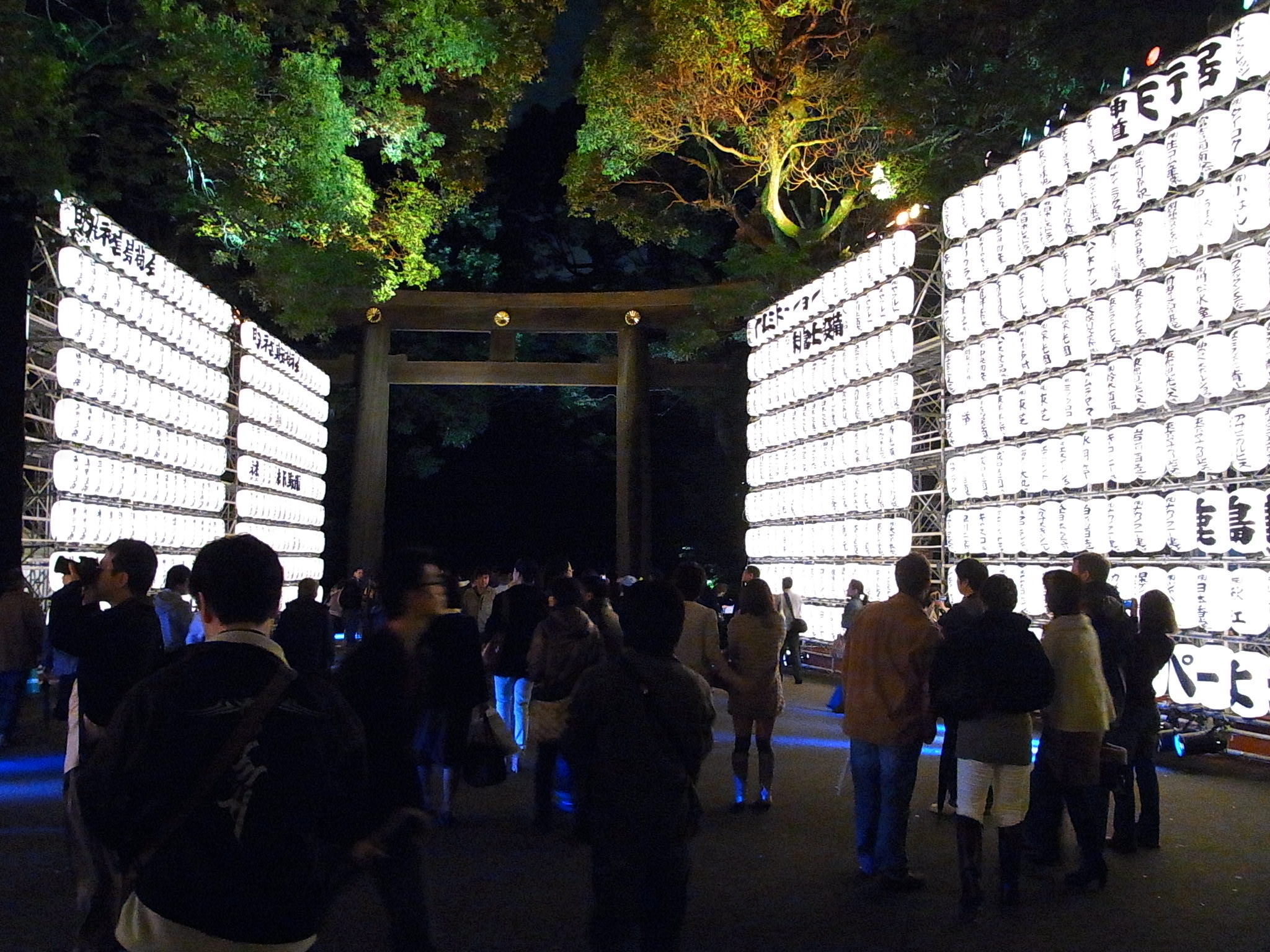
Around Otorii (Ichino Torii) (photographed on October 31, 2010)

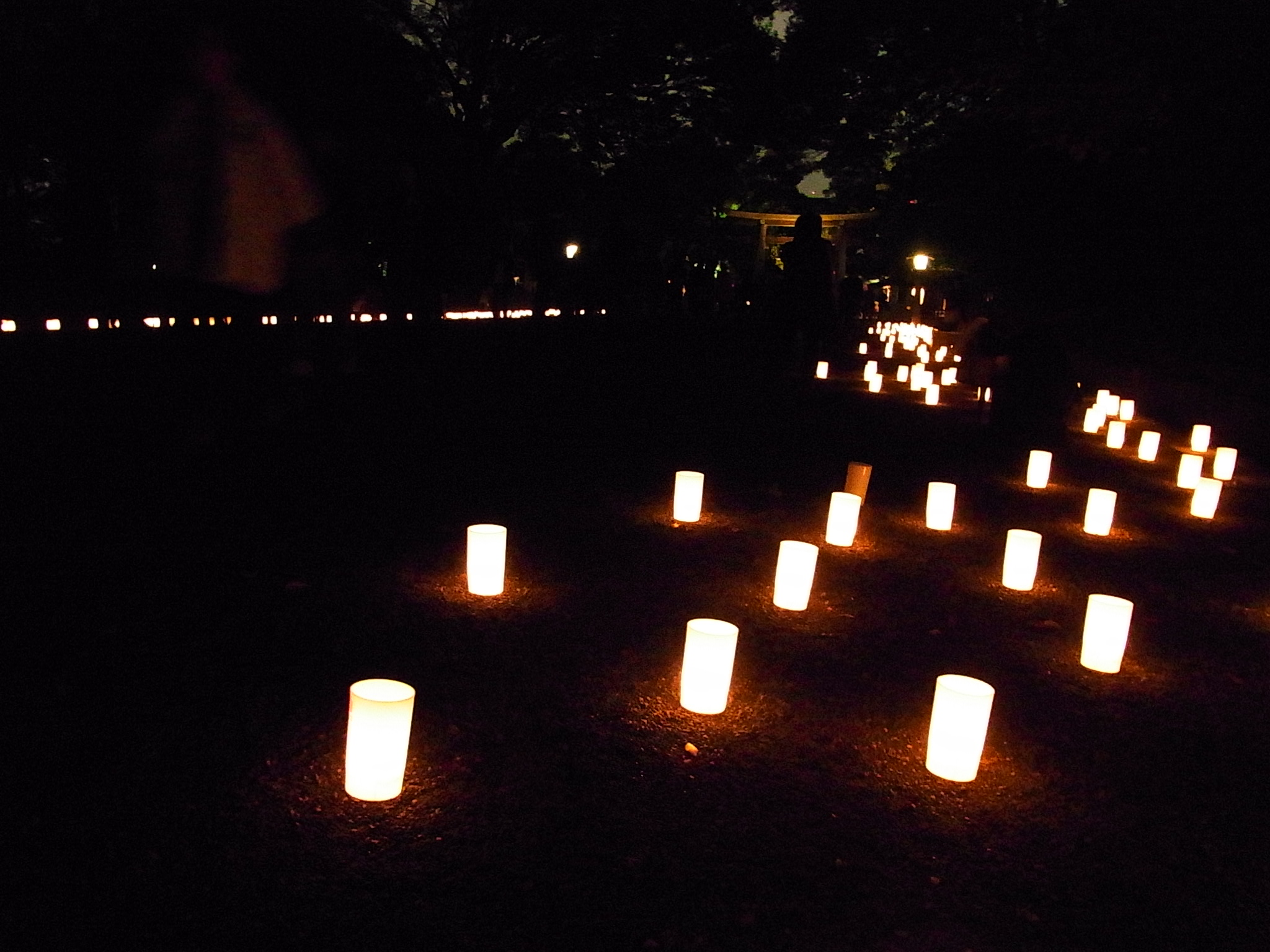
Proceed along the south approach (photographed on October 31, 2010)

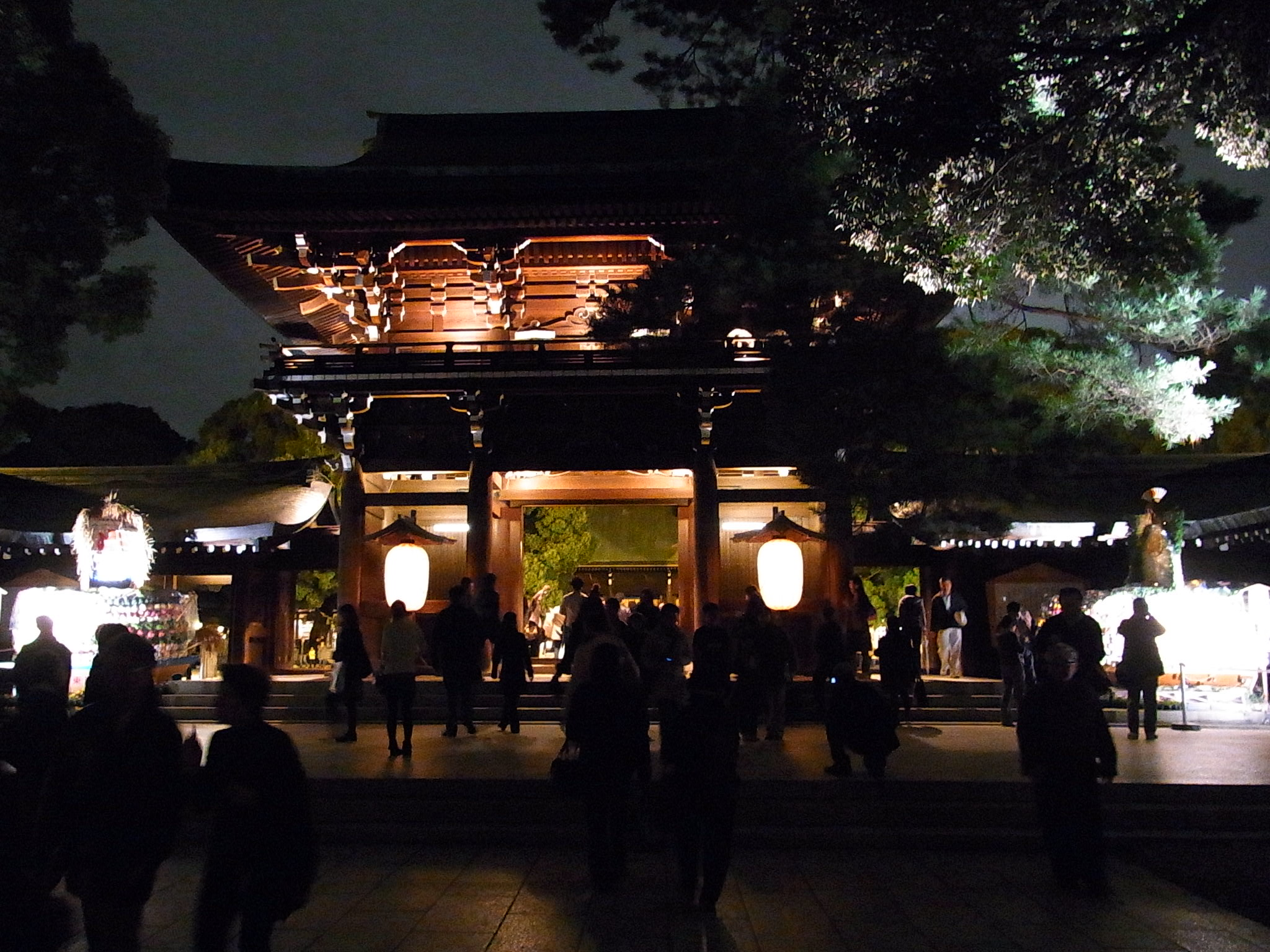
In front of Minamijinmon (photographed on October 31, 2010)

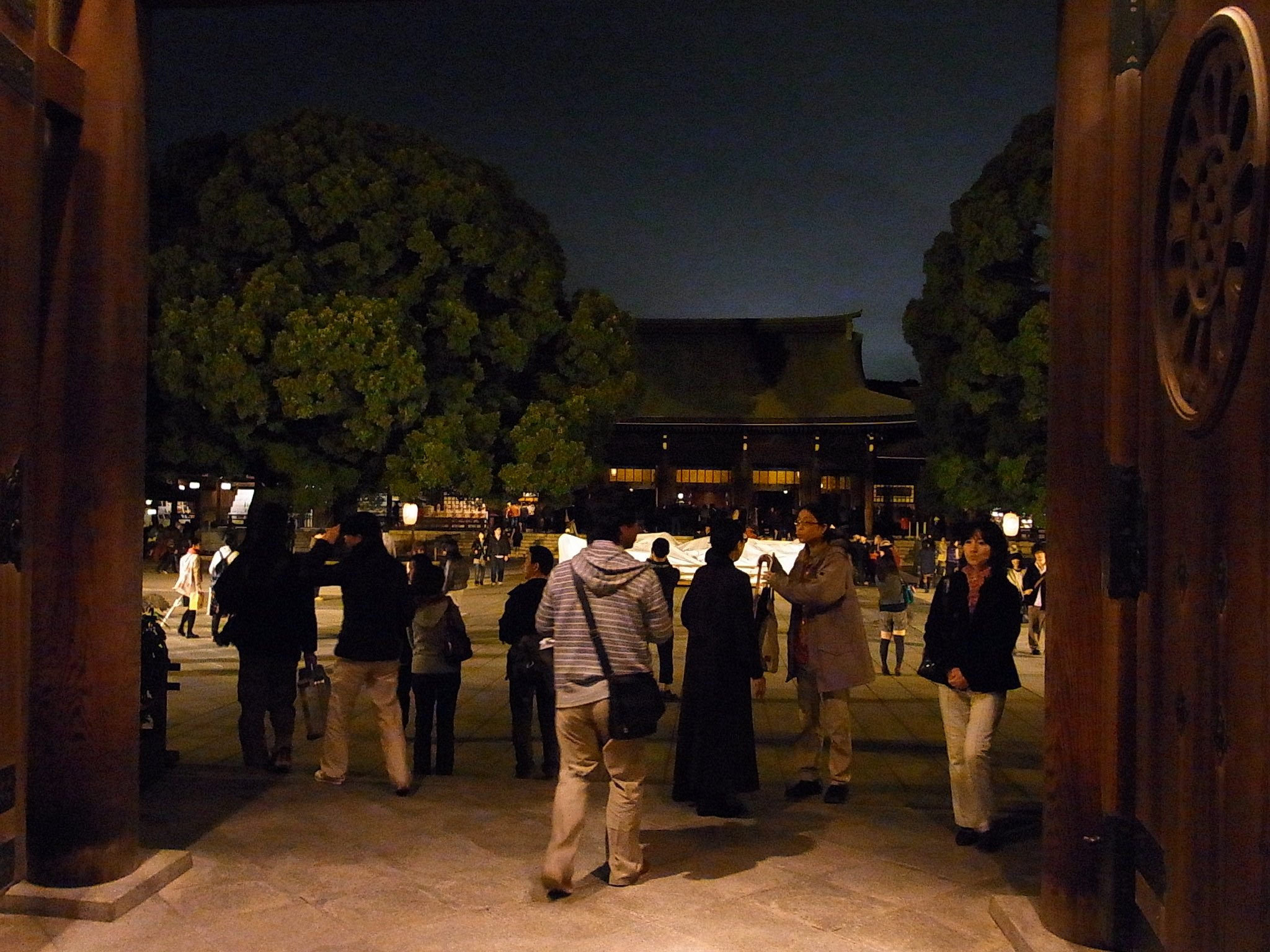
View the worship hall from the South Shrine (photographed on October 31, 2010)

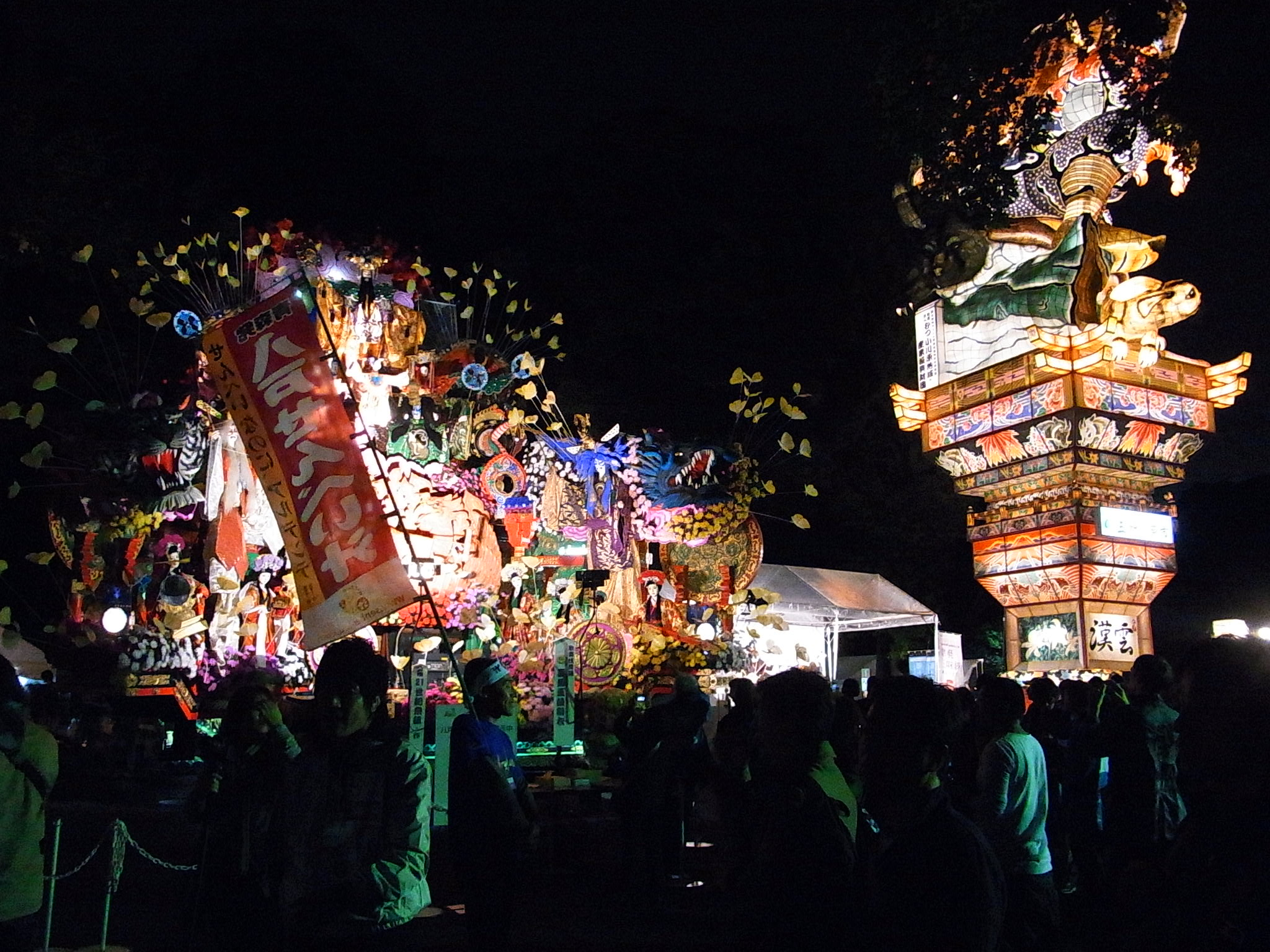
Dedication festival (photographed on October 31, 2010)

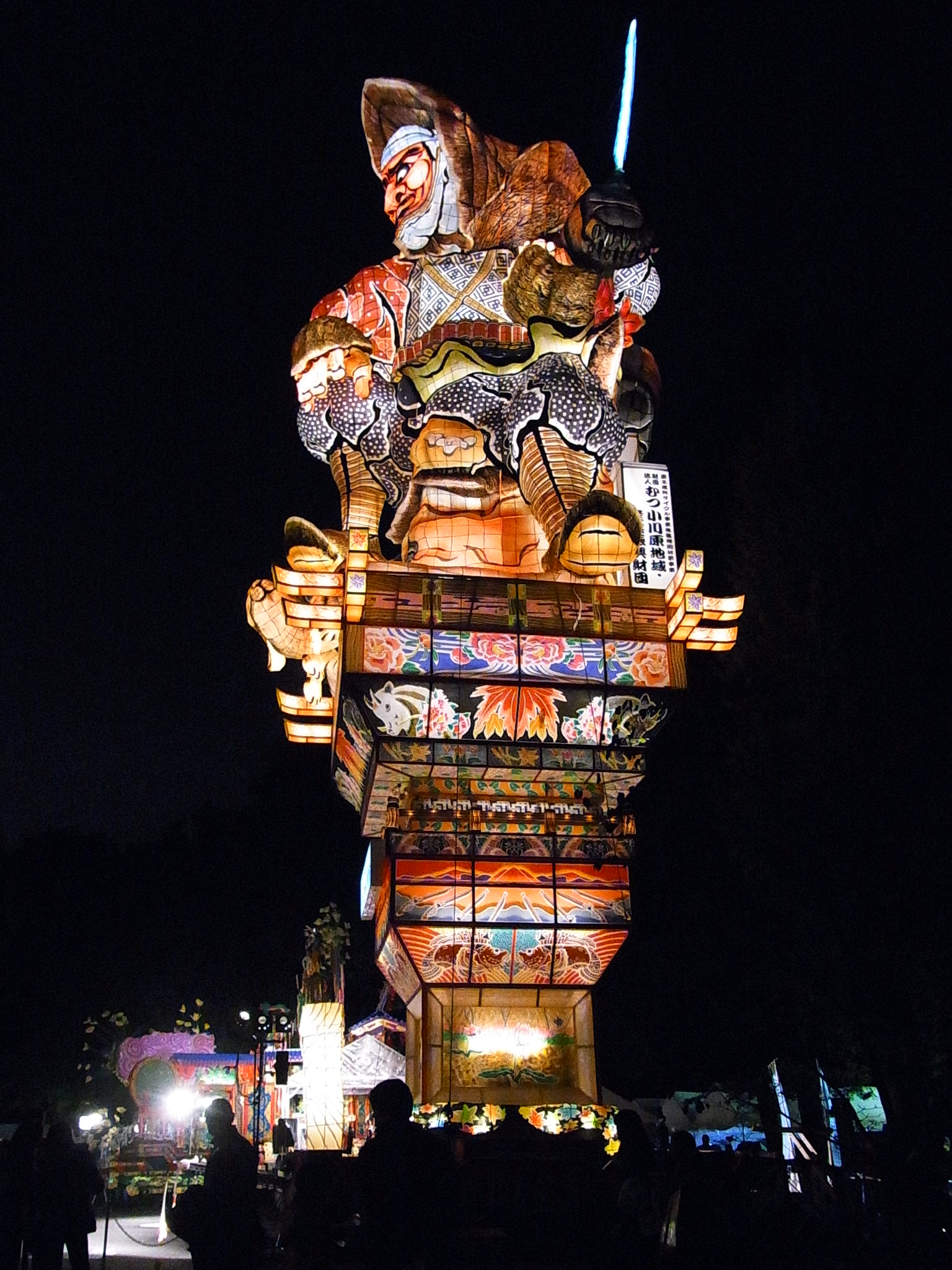
Dedication festival (photographed on October 31, 2010)

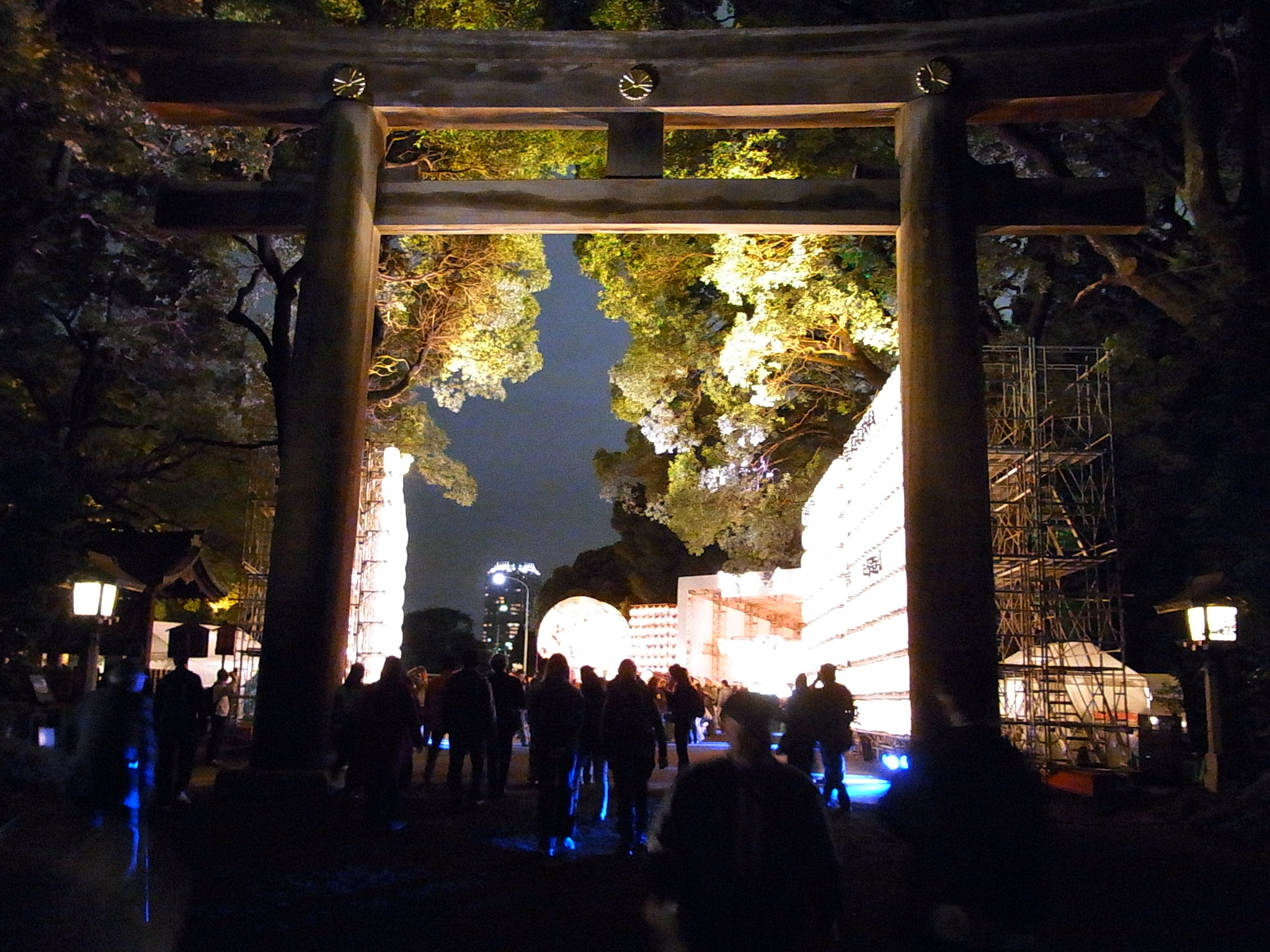
View Otorii from the south approach (photographed on October 31, 2010)

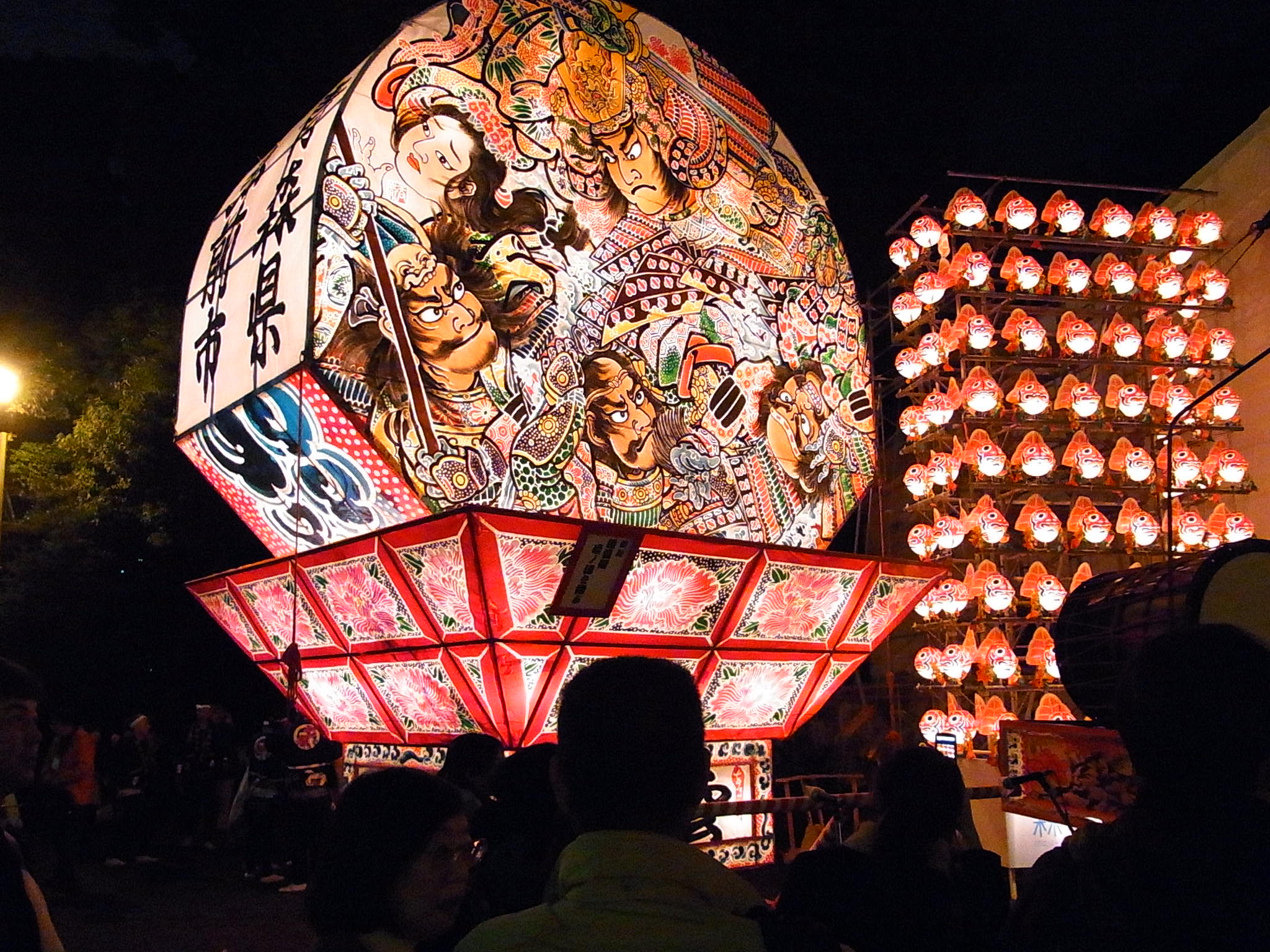
Around Otorii (photographed on October 31, 2010)

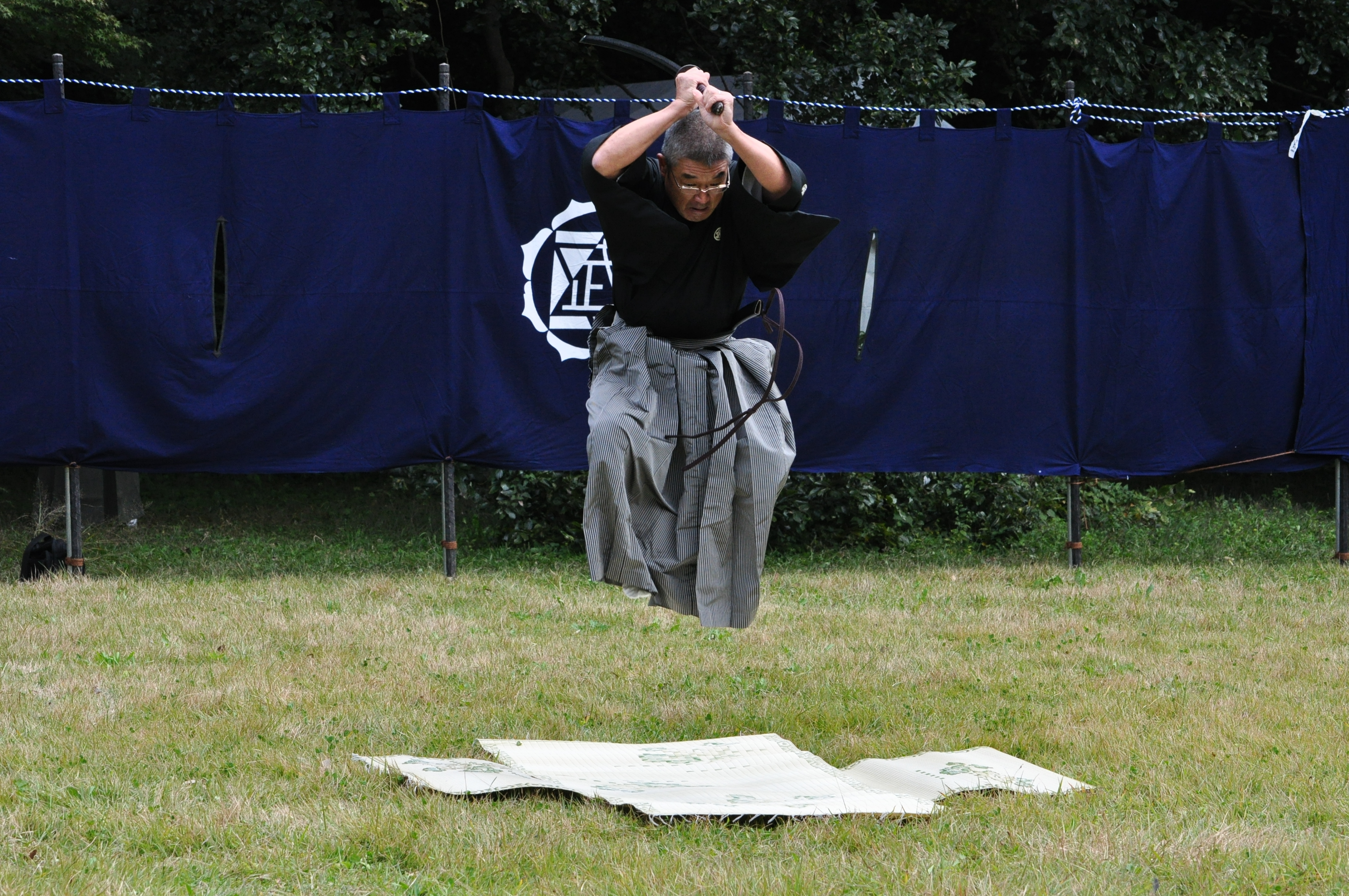
Ancient Martial Arts Dedication at the Festival of Autumn (November 2, 2012)

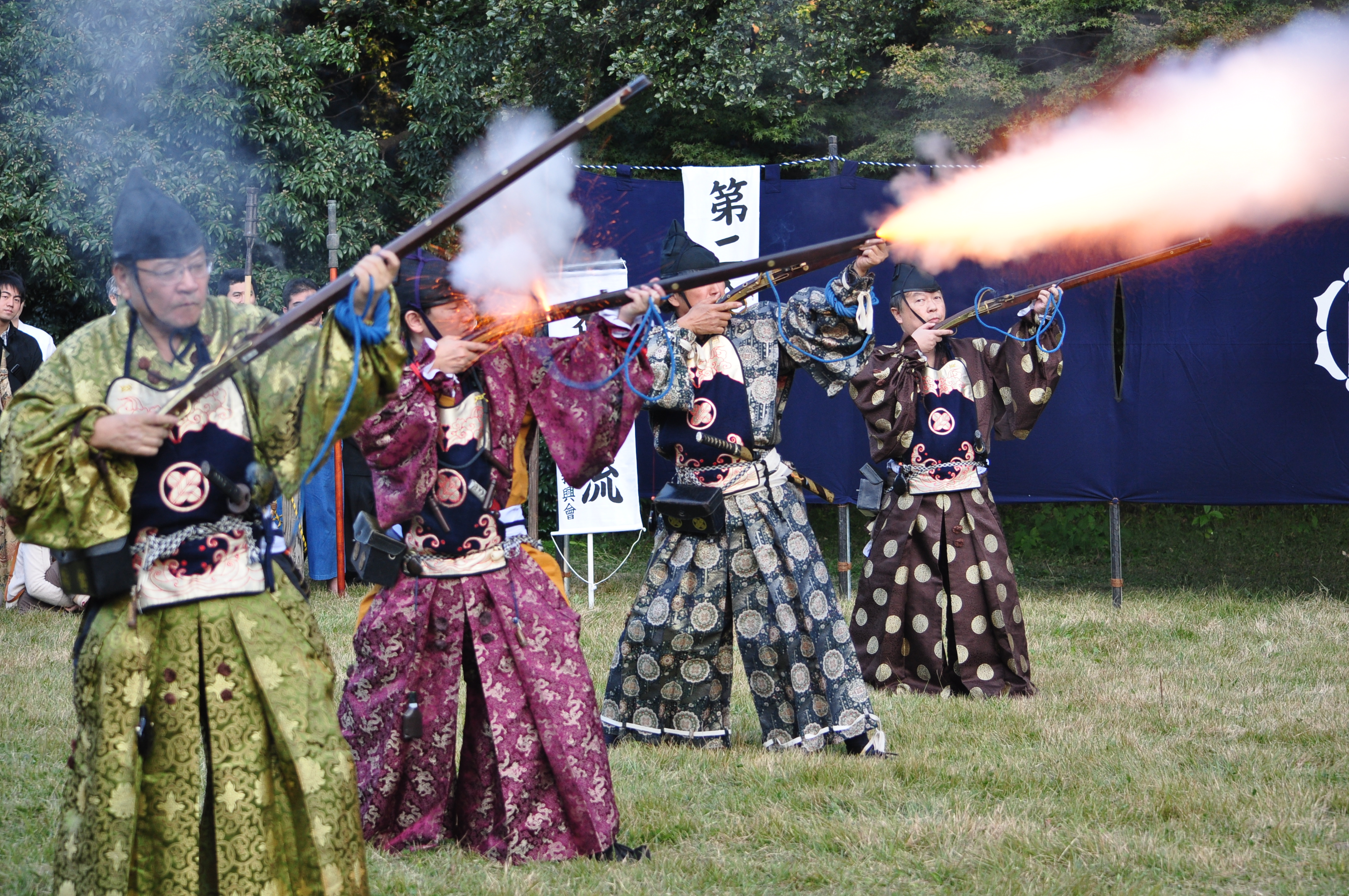
Classical martial arts (gunnery) demonstration at the Festival of Autumn (November 3, 2012)

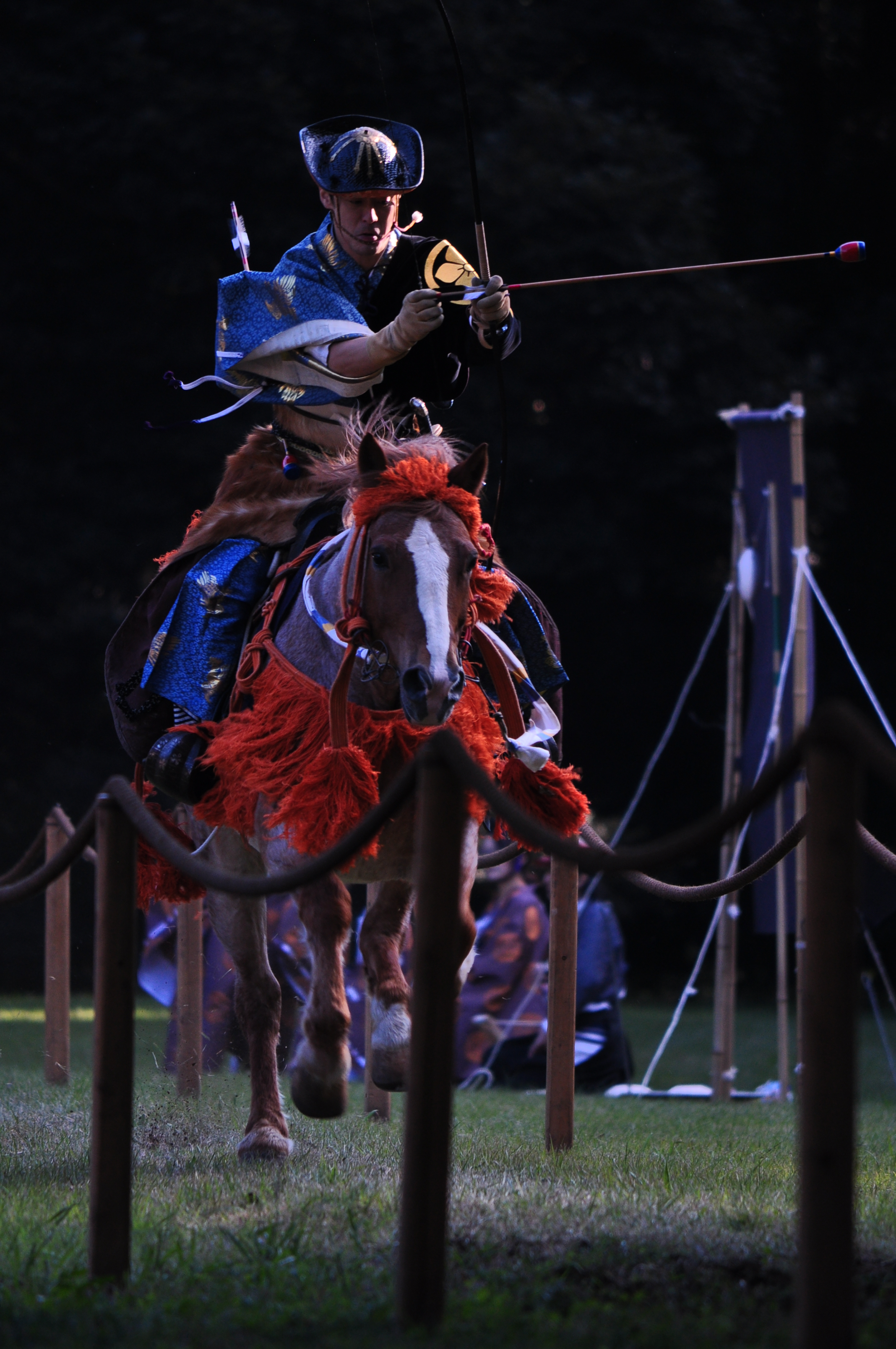
Demon Flower Vacation at the Festival of Autumn (November 2, 2012)

== Gallery ==
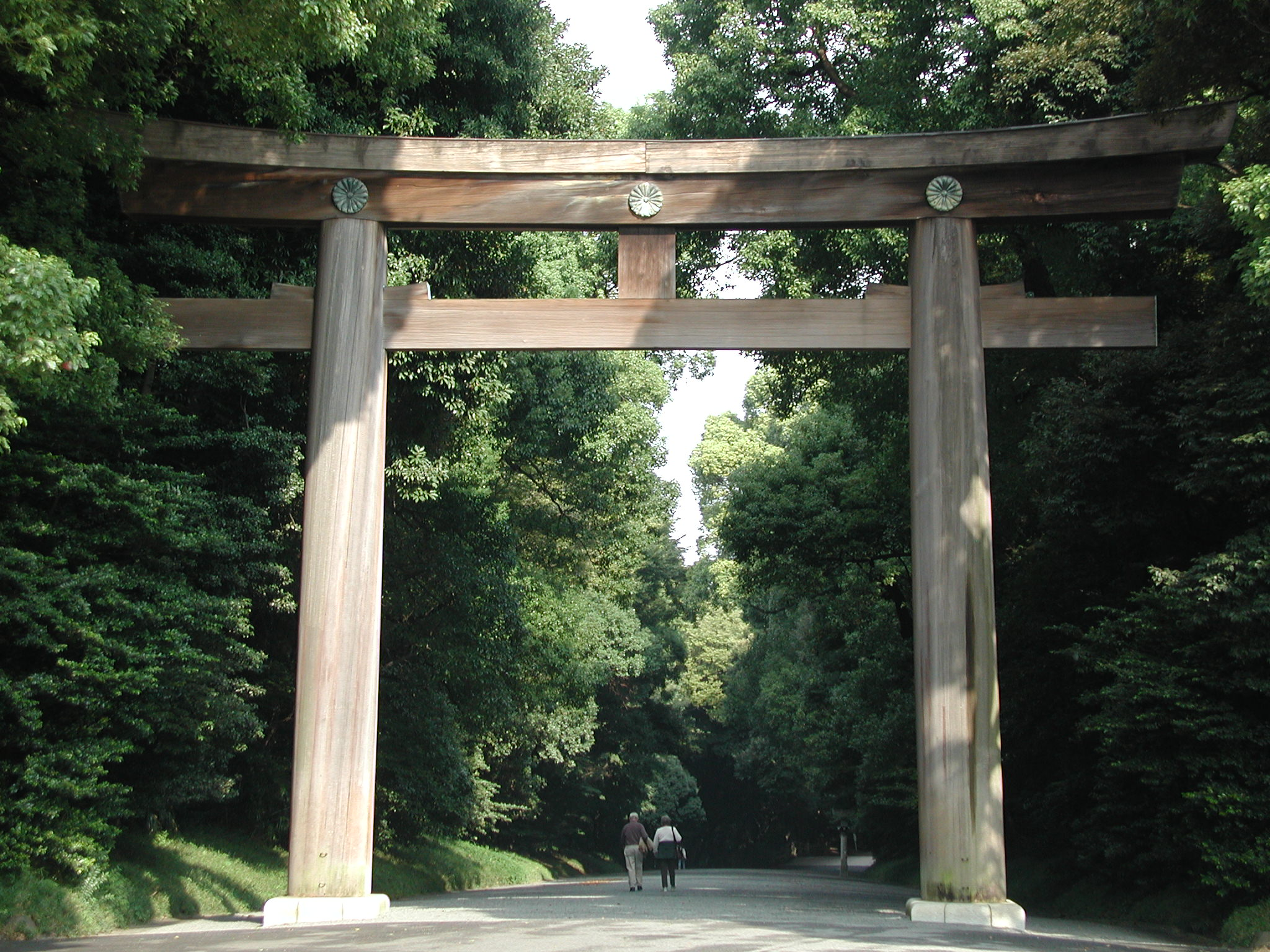
Torii at the entrance to Meiji-jingu

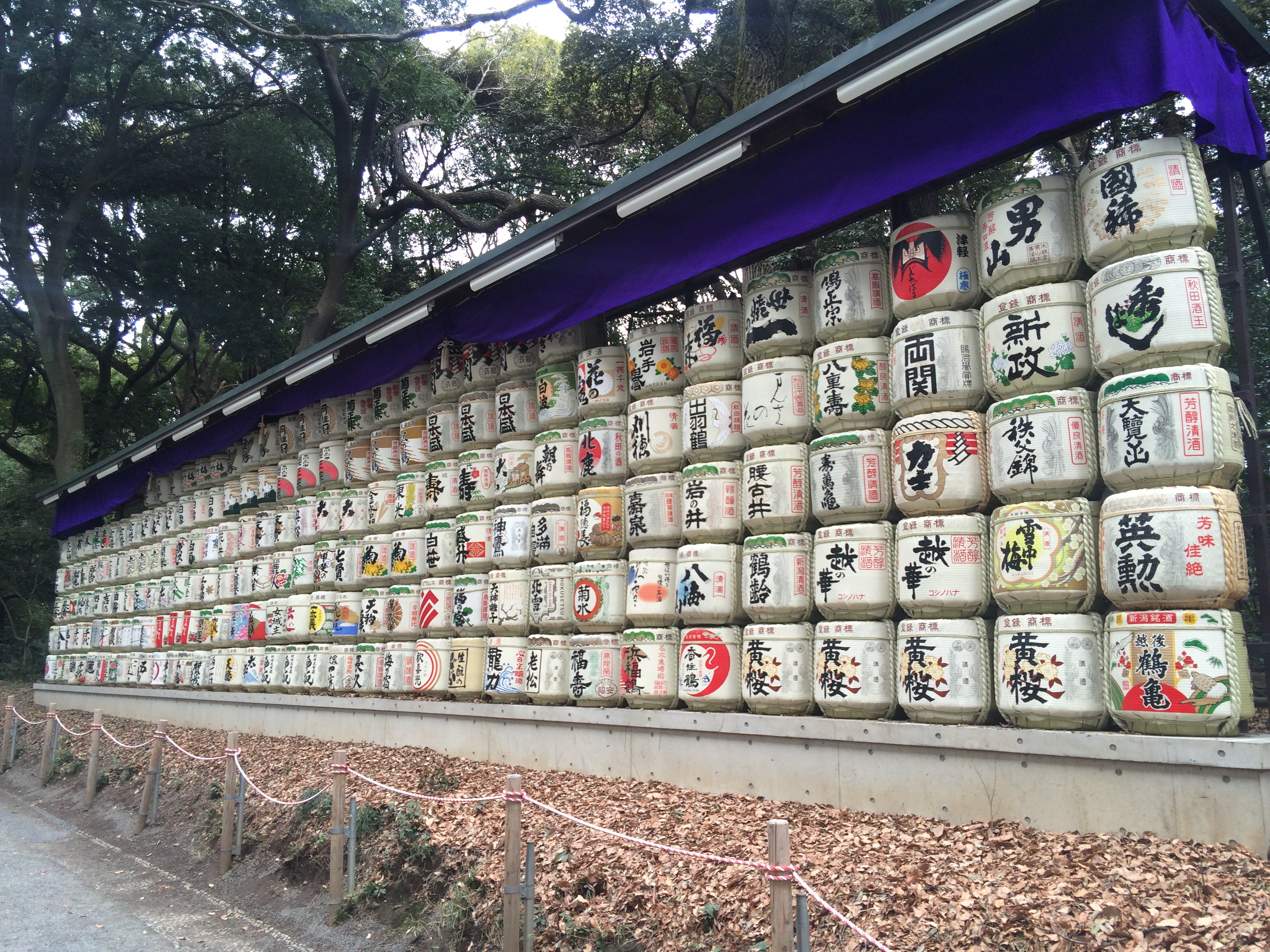
Barrels of sake (nihonshu) donated to Meiji Shrine

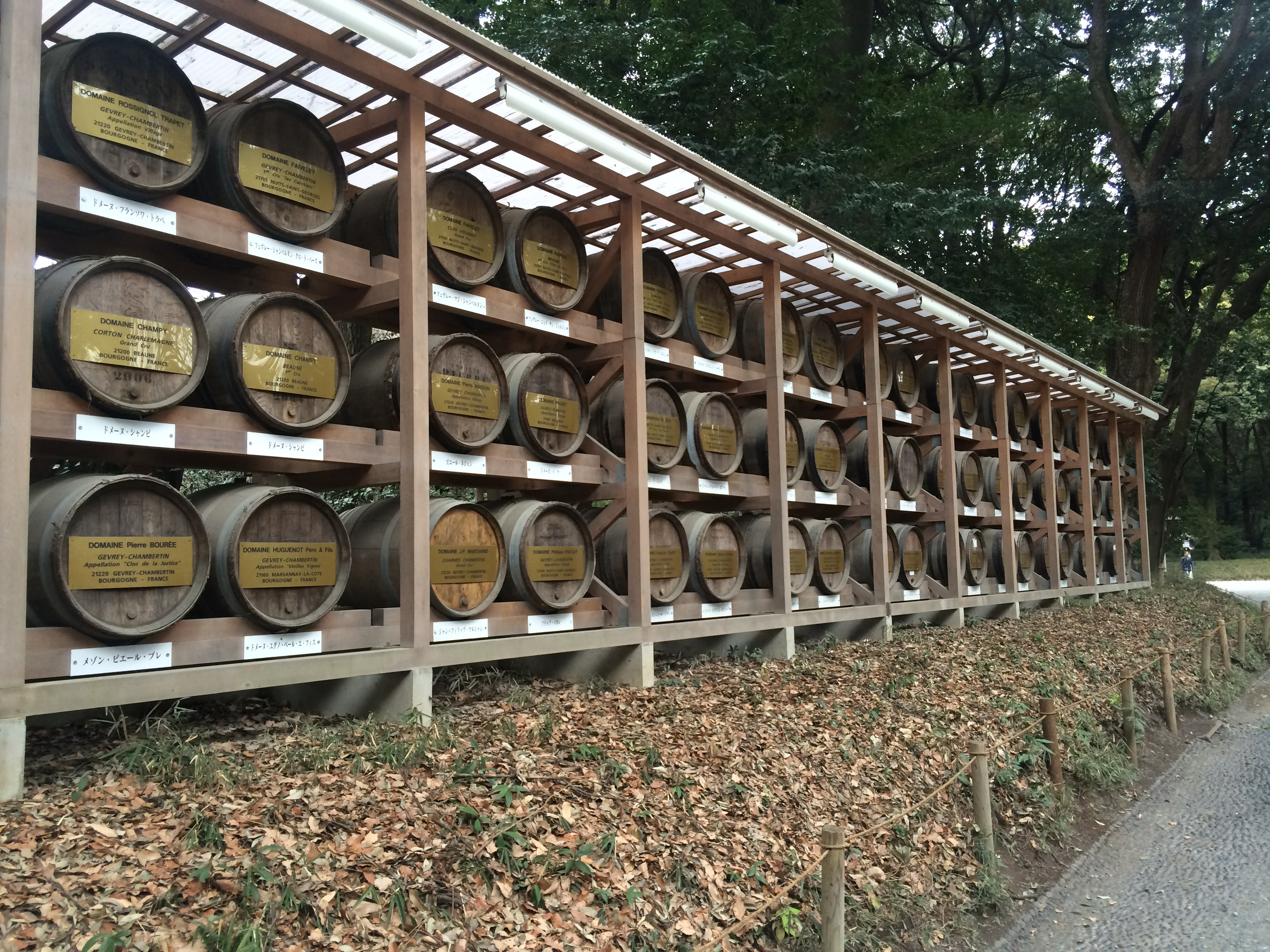
Barrels of Burgundy wine from France donated to Meiji-shrine

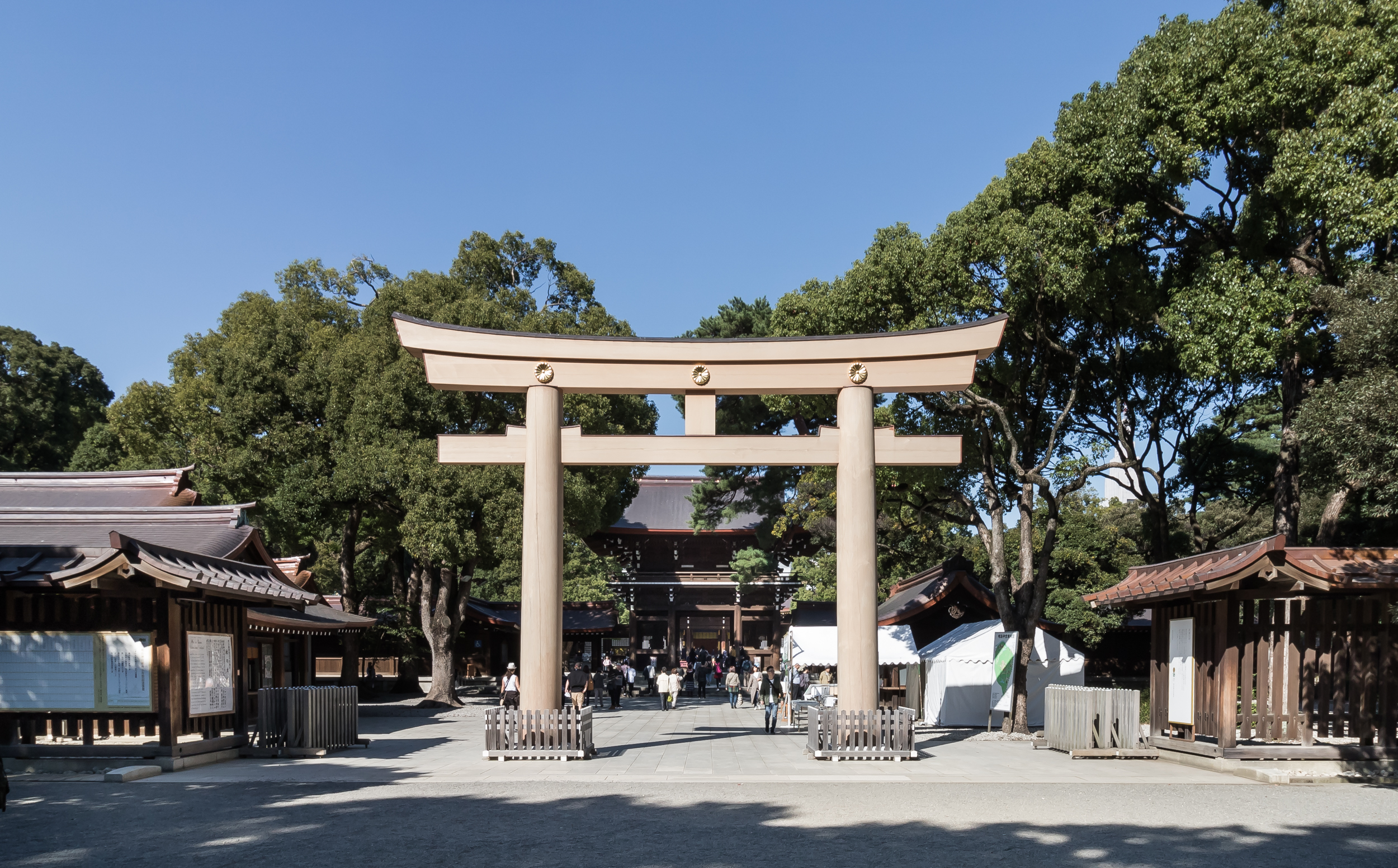
Torii at the courtyard of Meiji-jingu

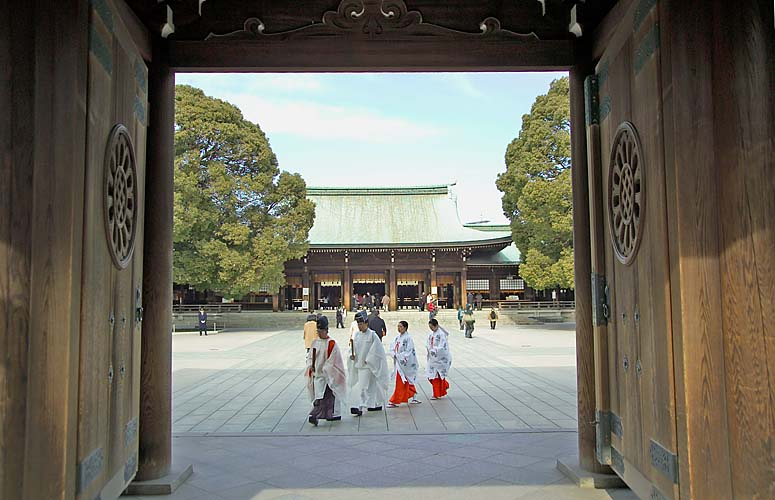
Priests and maidens wear traditional dress in preparation for a wedding at Meiji Shrine

Several scenes on a rainy day in Meiji Shrine

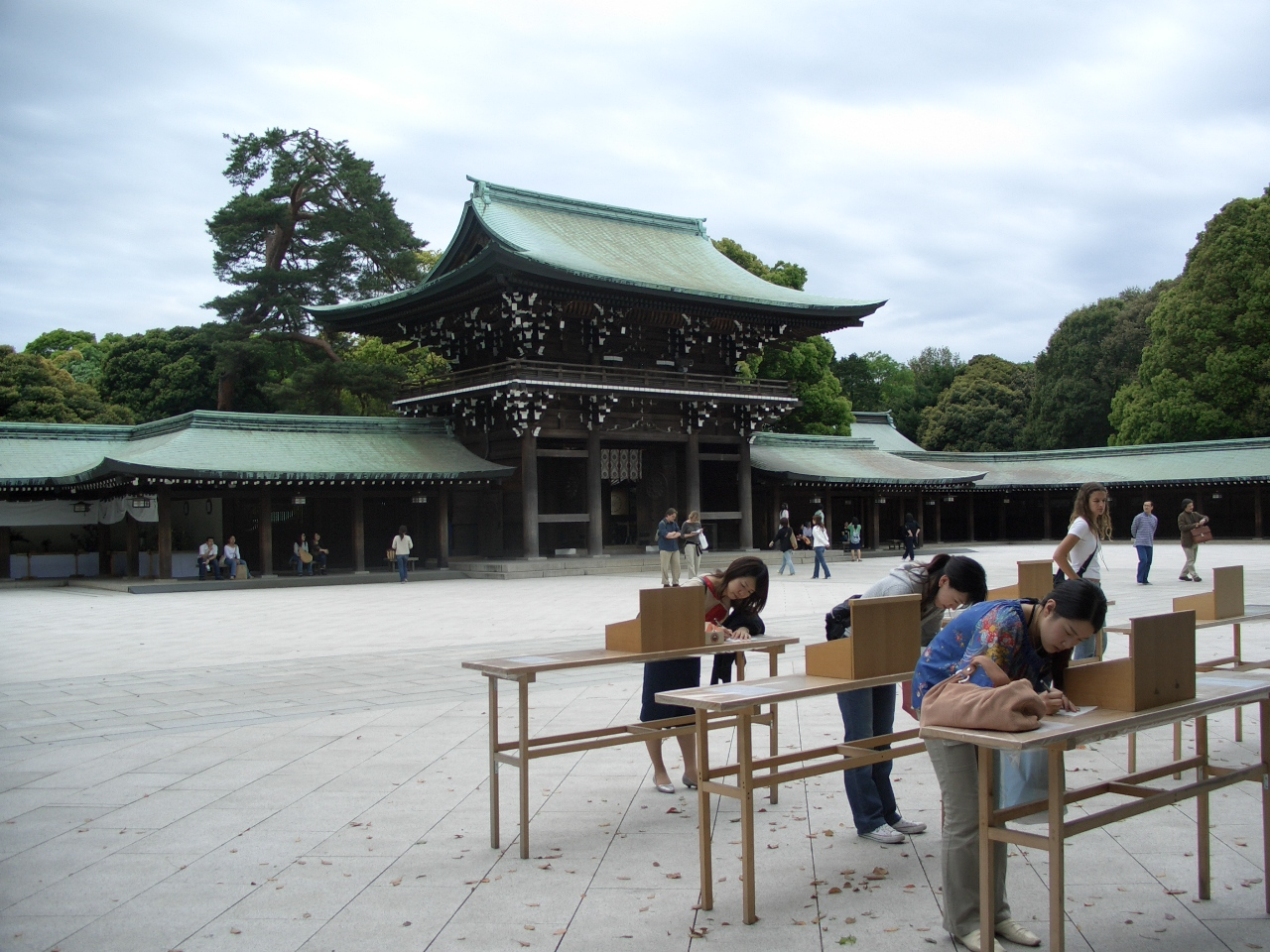
Women signing prayers in main courtyard

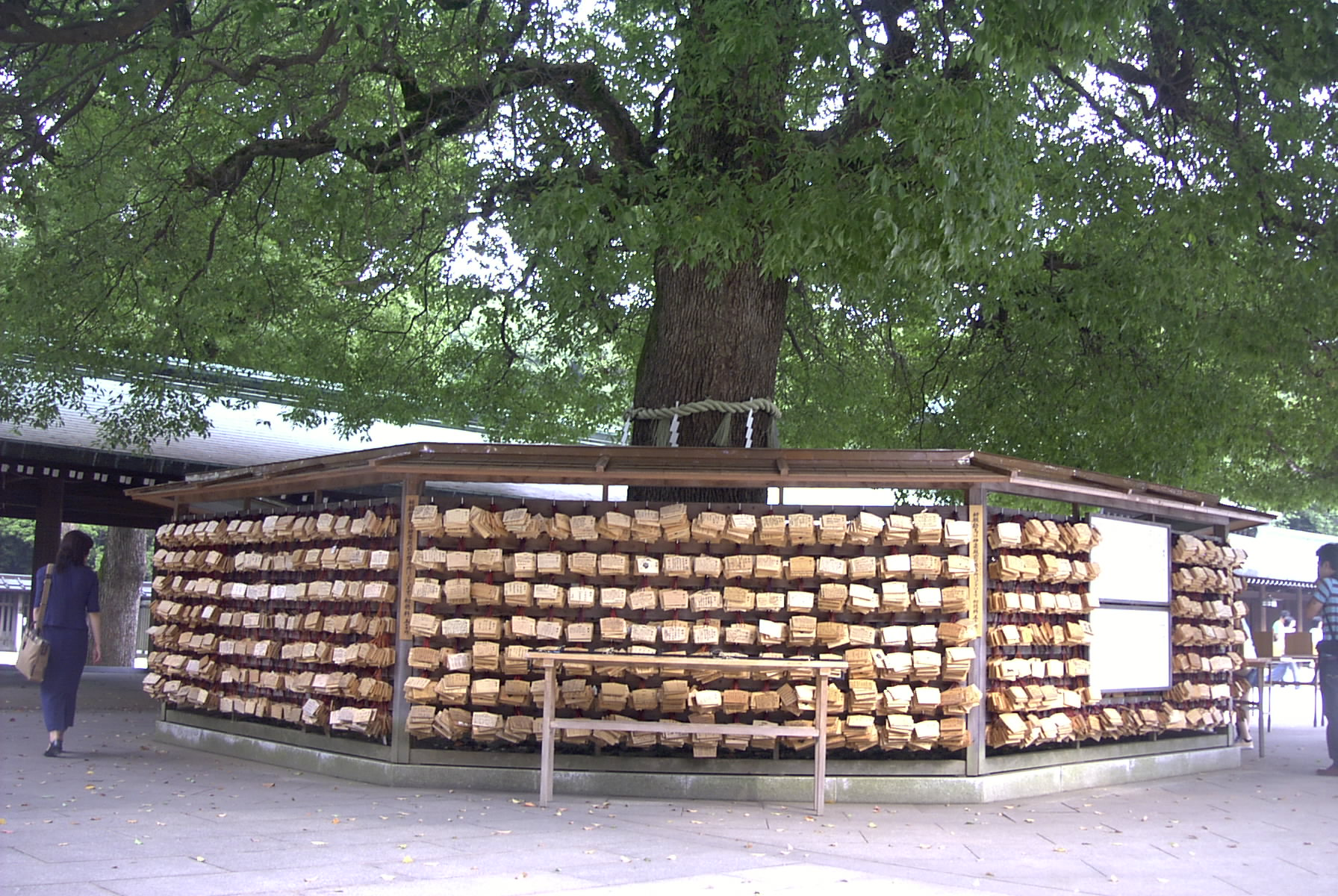
Prayers left by visitors

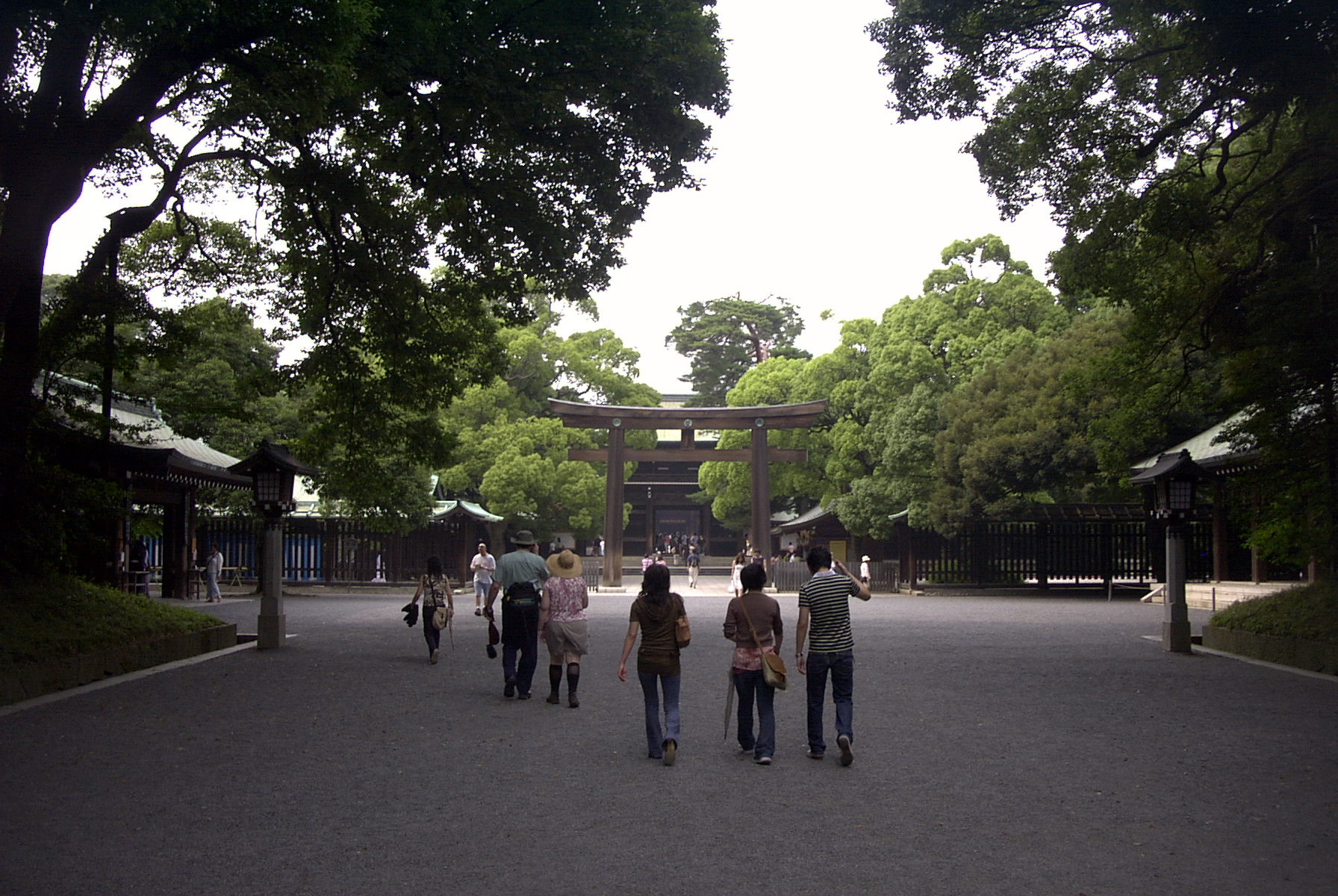
In front of Meiji shrine

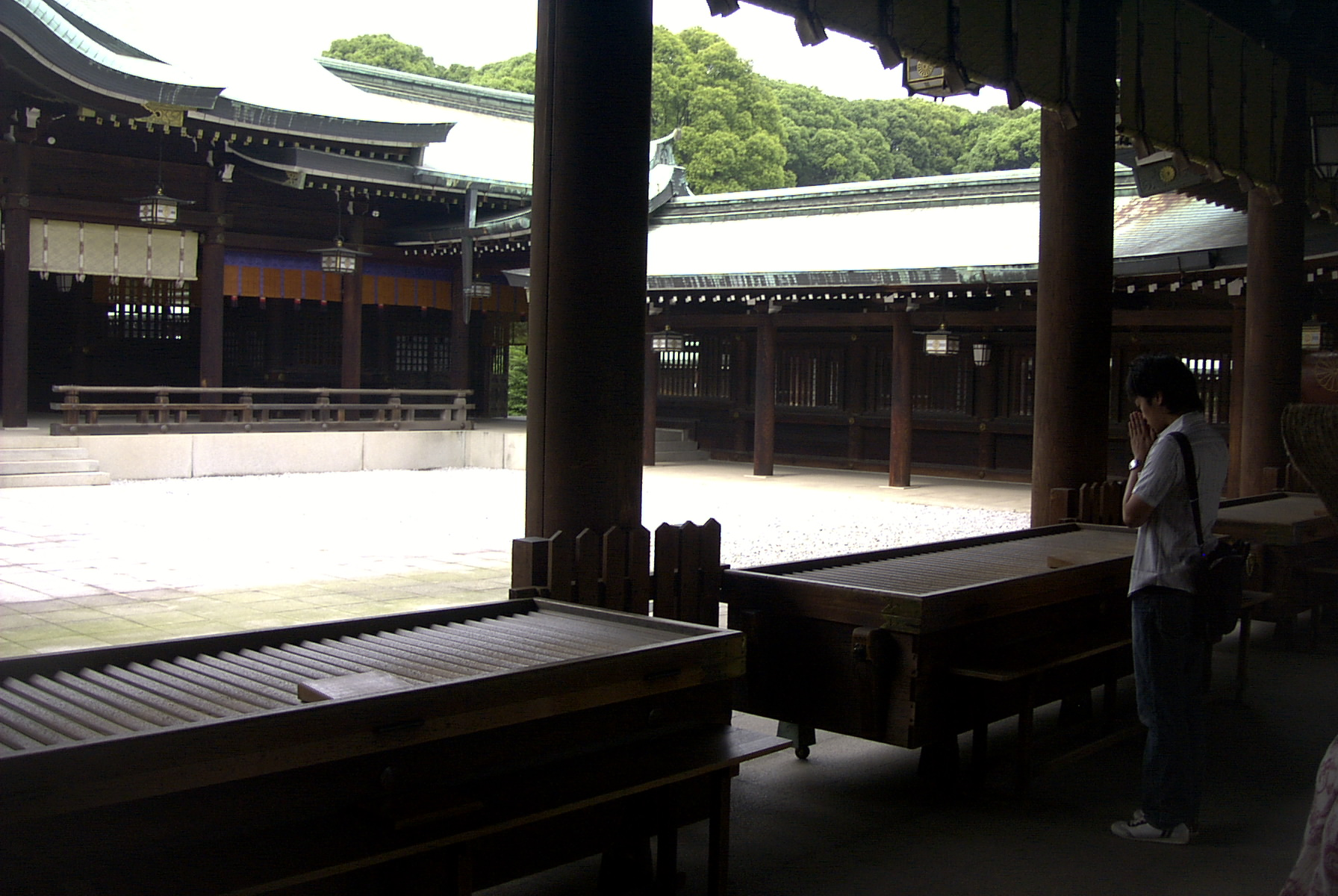
The central sanctuary

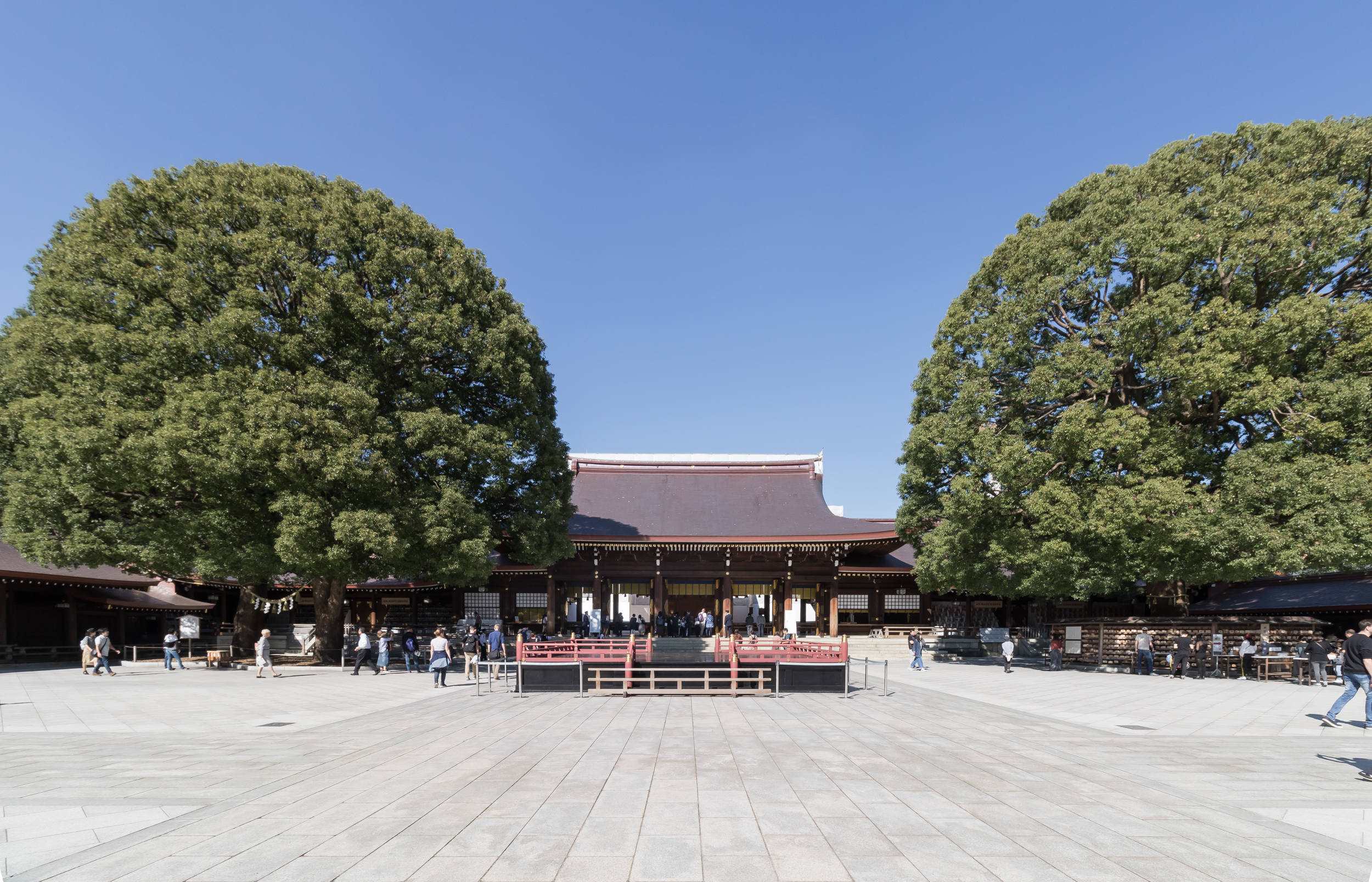
Full view of the shrine

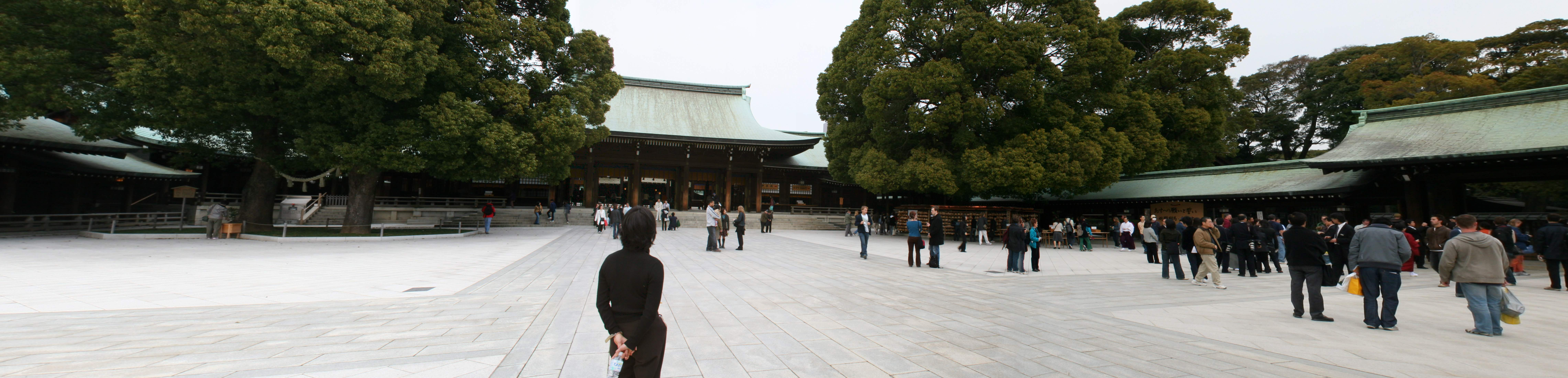
Meiji Shrine main yard panorama

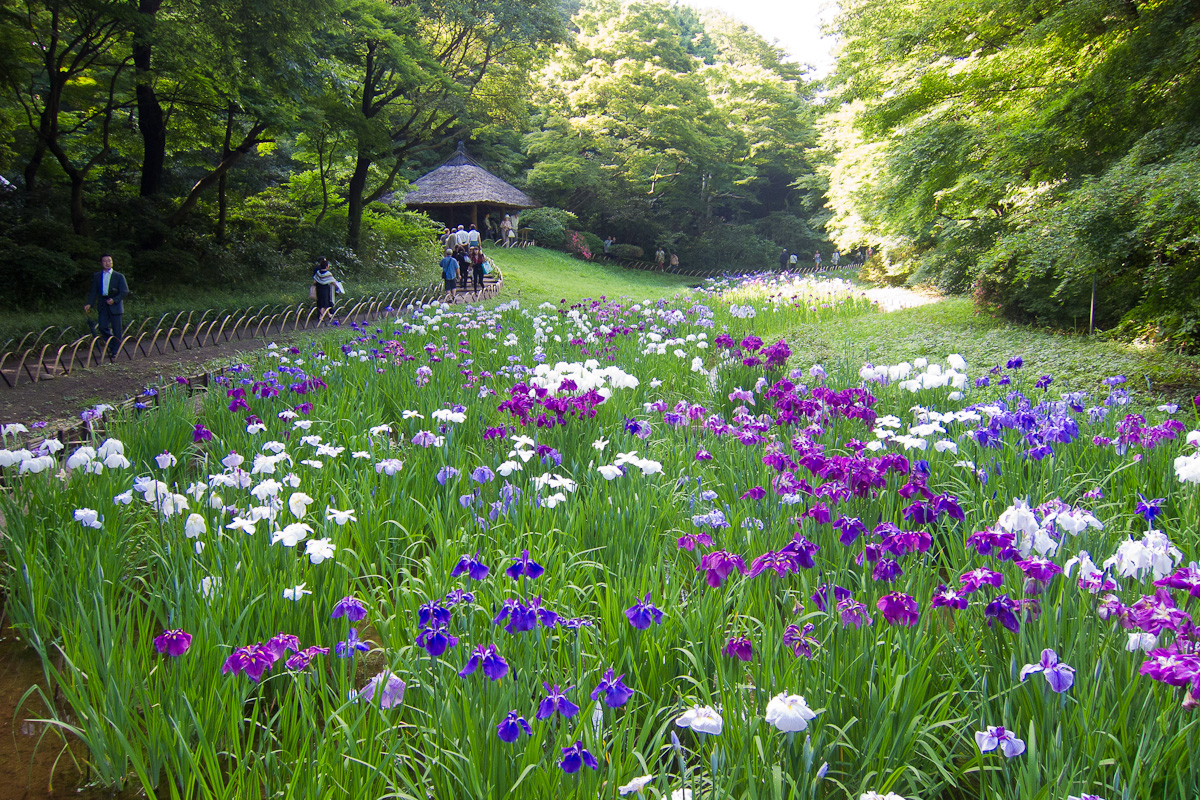
Meiji Shrine Gyoen (inner garden)

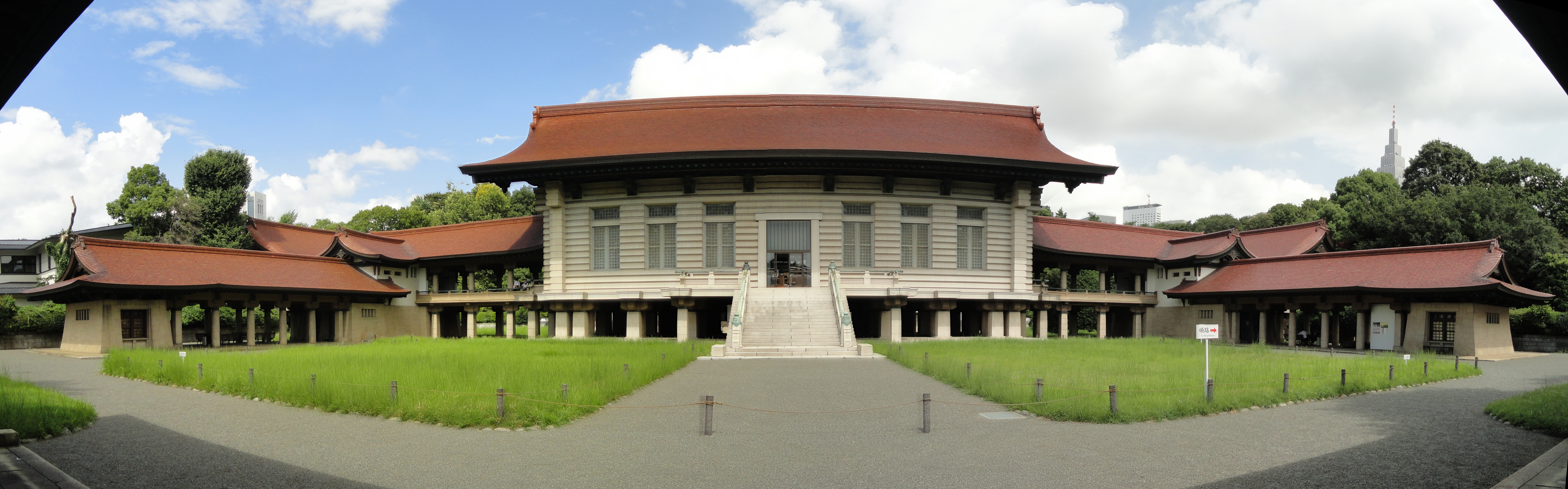
Meiji Shrine Treasure Museum

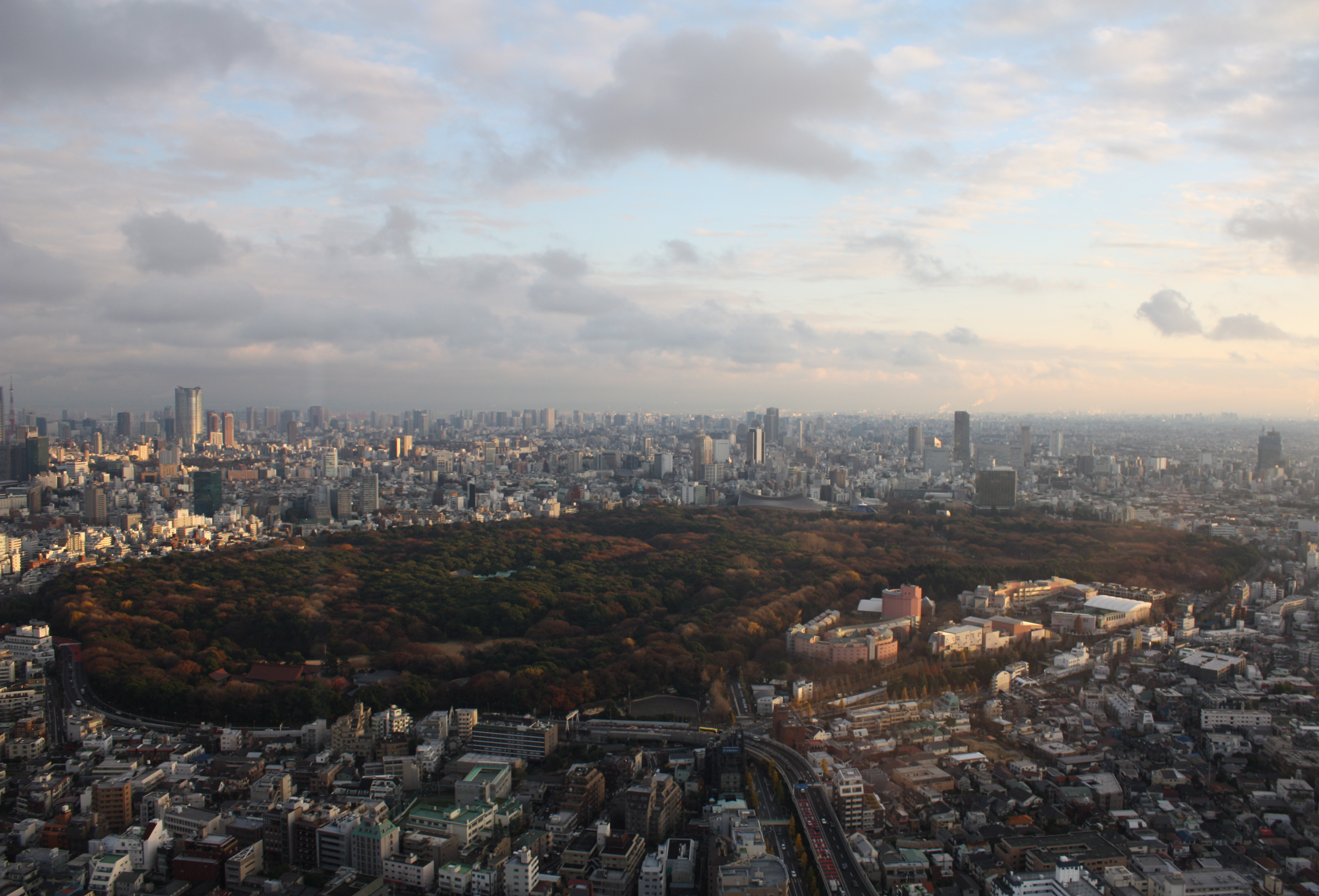
Meiji Shrine with Yoyogi Park

== See also ==
- List of Jingū
- List of Shinto shrines
- Meiji Jingu Stadium
