= Jingūmae =

District in Shibuya, Tokyo, Japan

Jingūmae 神宮前
- Neighborhood in Shibuya
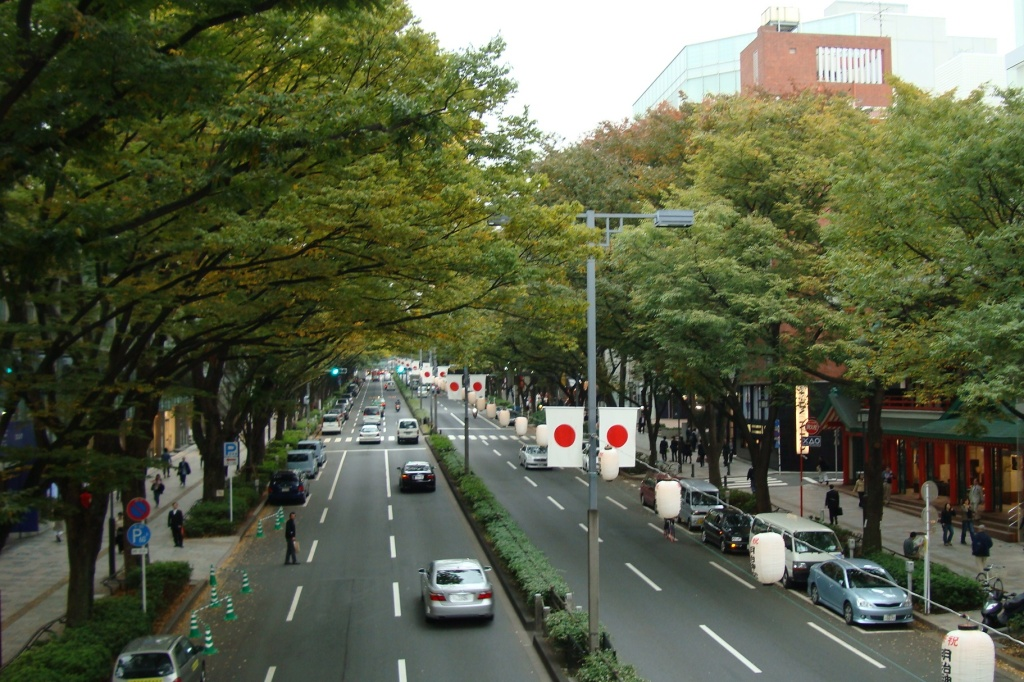
- Omotesandō
- Interactive map of Jingūmae
- Coordinates: 35°40′09″N 139°42′27″E
- Country: Japan
- Prefecture: Tokyo
- Special ward: Shibuya

Population (1 October 2020)
  - Total: 12,446
- Time zone: UTC+09:00
- ZIP code: 150-0001
- Telephone area code: 03

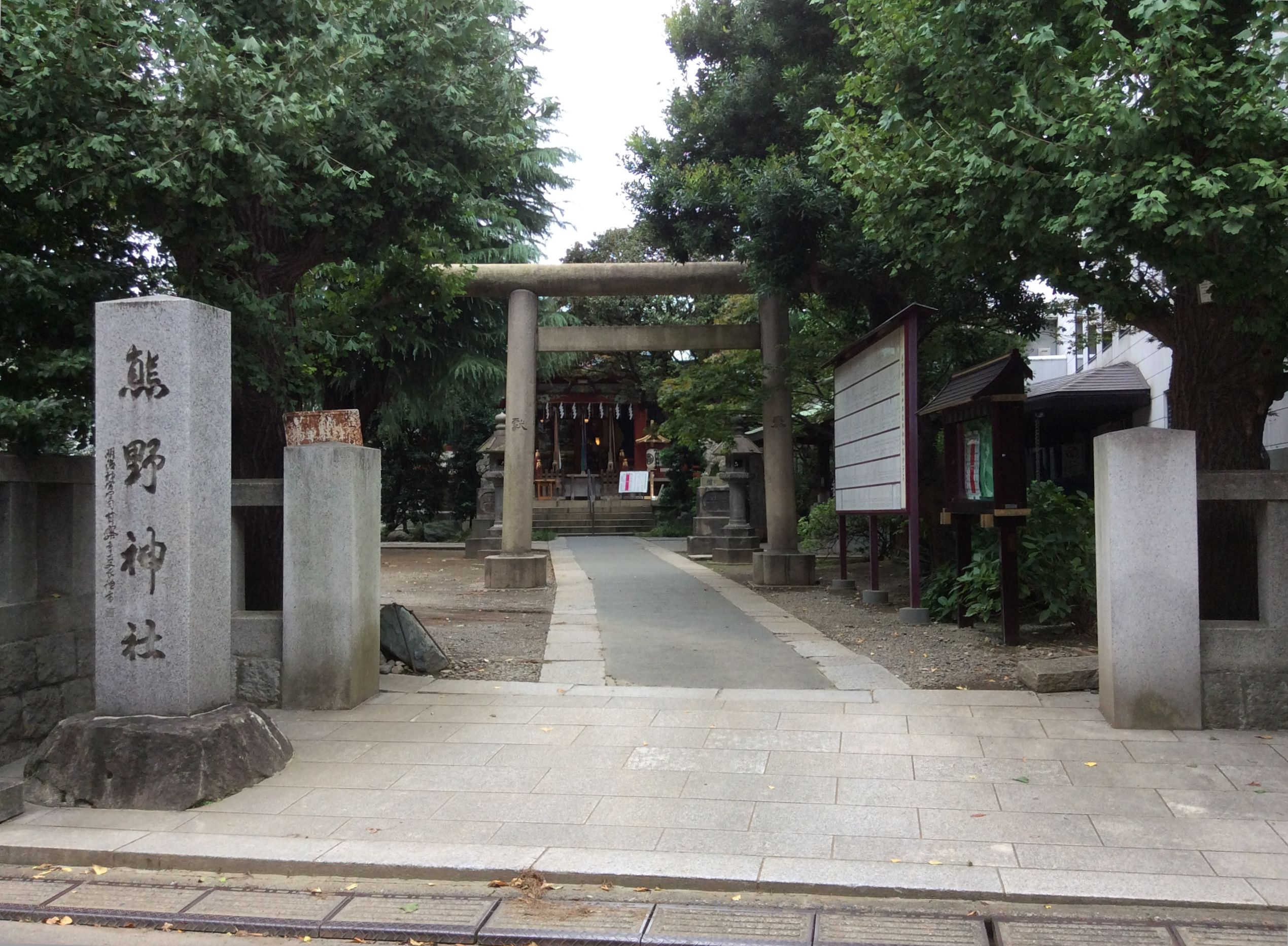
Kumano Shrine

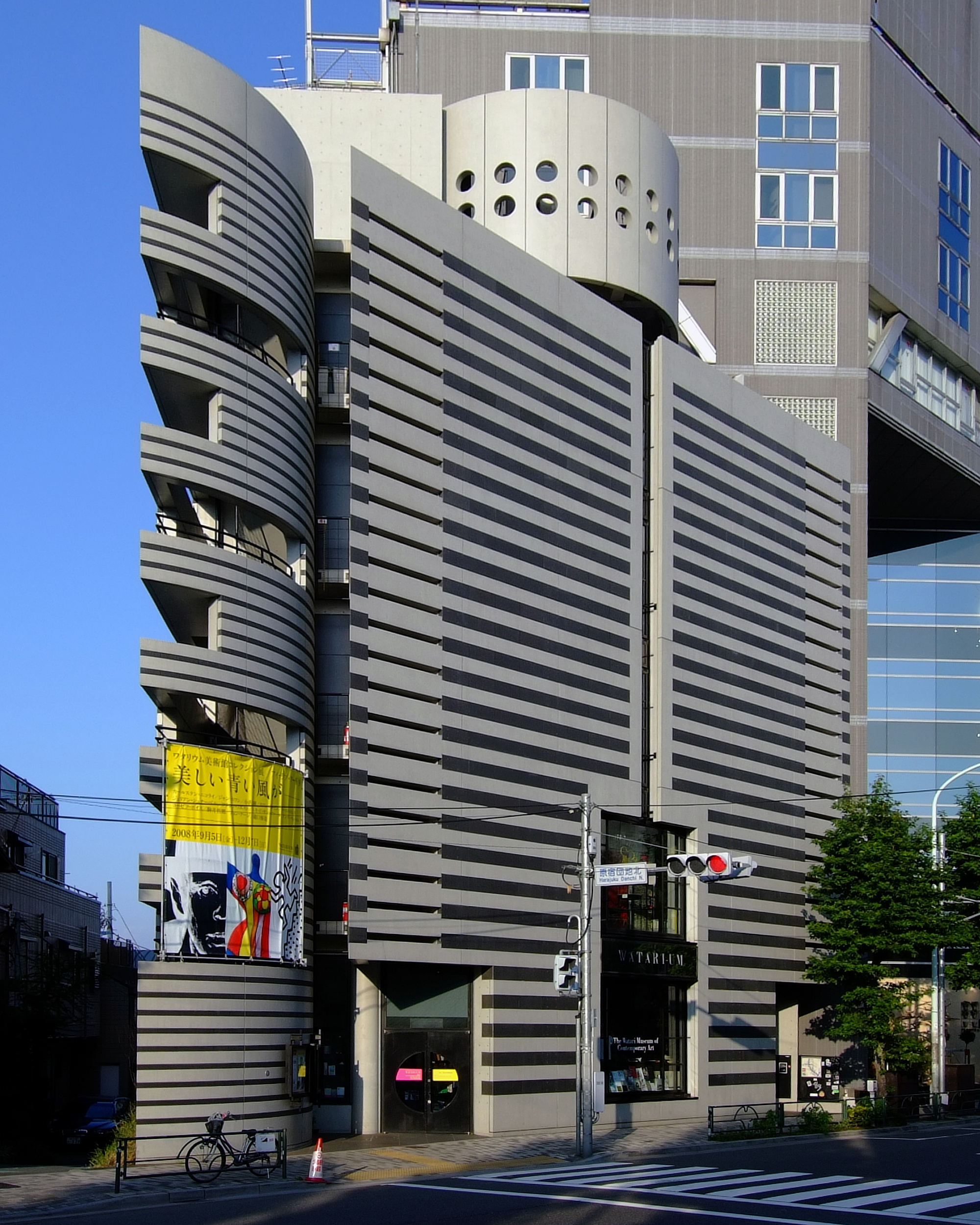
Watarium

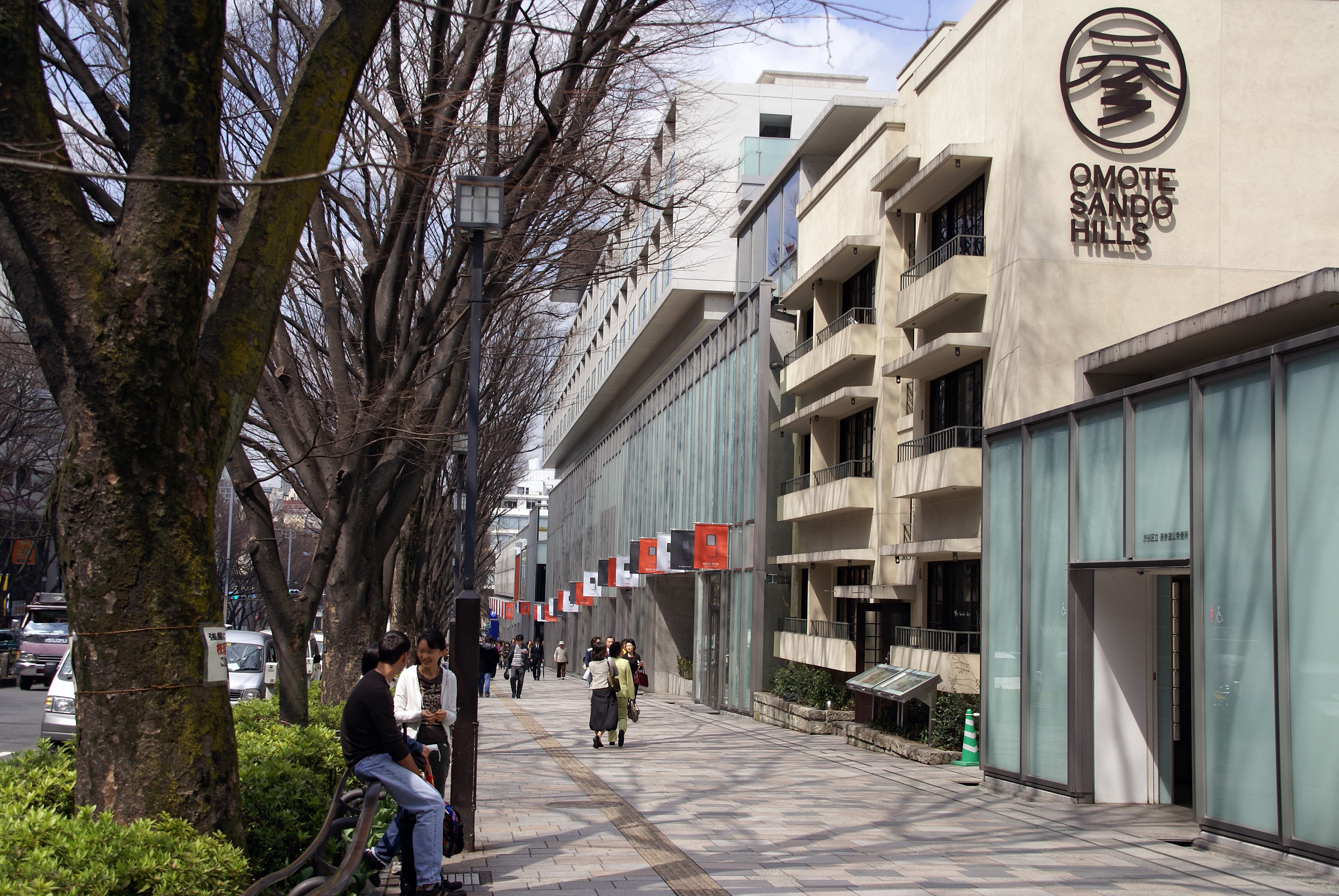
Omotensando Hills

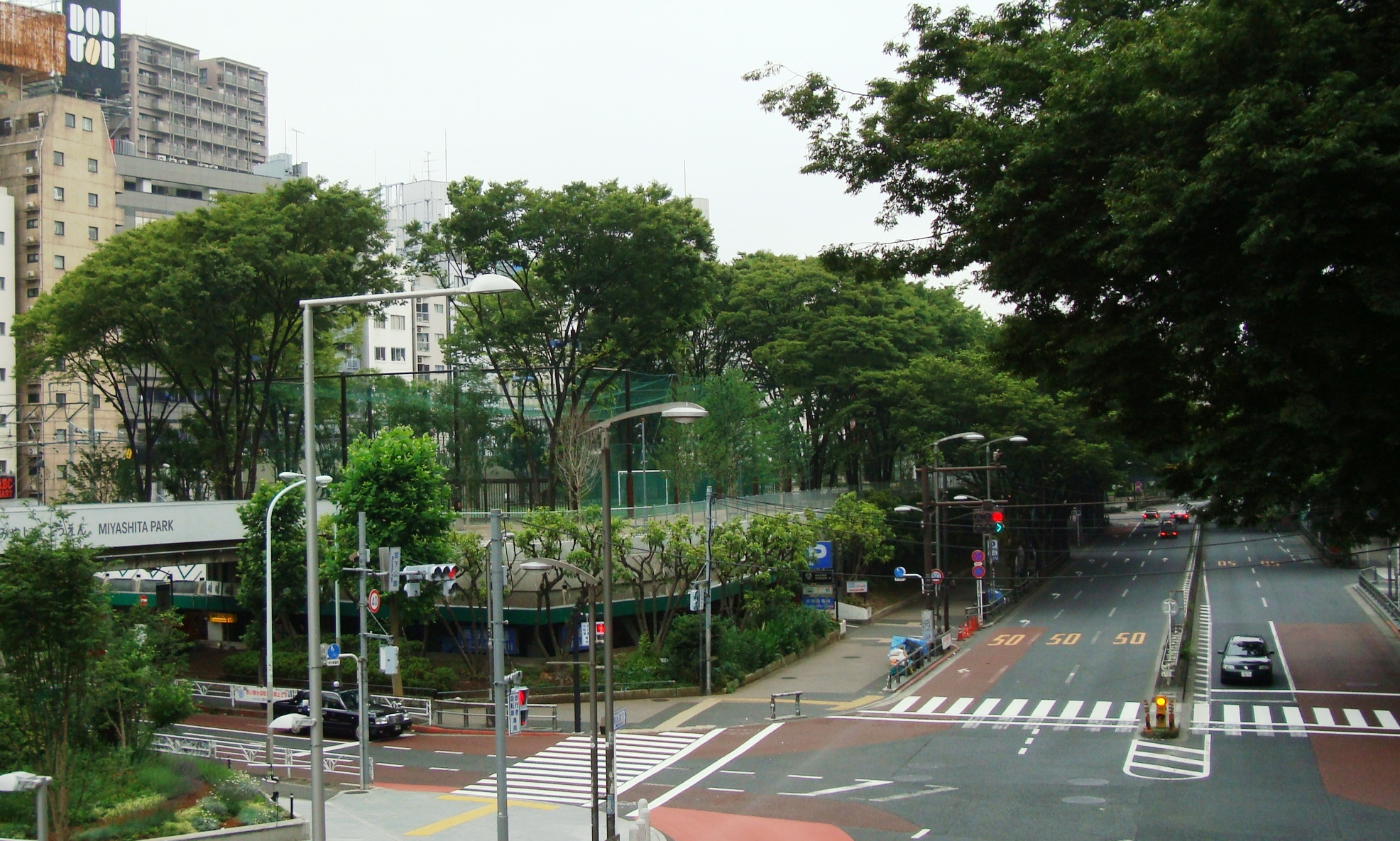
Miyashita Park and Meiji Dori Ave

Jingūmae (神宮前) is a district of Shibuya, Tokyo, Japan.

As of October 2020, the population of this district is 12,446. The postal code for Jingūmae is 150–0001.

== Places of interest ==
=== Cultural ===
==== Shrines ====
- Tōgō Shrine
- Aoyama Kumano Shrine (青山熊野神社) (Jingūmae 2-2-22)

==== Temples ====
- Myōenji (Jingūmae 3-8-9)
- Chōanji (Jingūmae 3-8-4)

==== Churches ====
- Tenrikyo Higashi Chuo Kyokai (Jingūmae 5-14-2)
- First Church of Christ, Scientist, Tokyo (Jingūmae 5-6-3)
- Tokyo Union Church (Jingūmae 5-7-7)

==== Museums ====
- Ukiyo-e Ōta Memorial Museum of Art
- Watari Museum of Contemporary Art
- Design Festa Gallery

=== Embassies ===
- Embassy of Turkey (Jingūmae 2-33-6)
- Embassy of Estonia (Jingūmae 2-6-15)

=== Other ===
- Harajuku Station
- Headquarters of Secom (Jingūmae 1-5-1)
- Takeshita Street
- Laforet Harajuku (Jingūmae 1-11-6)
- Harajuku Alta (Jingūmae 1-16-4)
- Omotesando Hills
- Tokyu Plaza Omotesando Harajuku (Jingūmae 4-30-4)
- YM Square Harajuku (Jingūmae 4-31)
- Headquarters of United Nations University (Jingūmae 5-53-70)
- Gyre (Jingūmae 5-10-1)
- Oriental Bazaar (Jingūmae 5-9-13)
- Miyashita Park

== Education ==
=== Schools ===
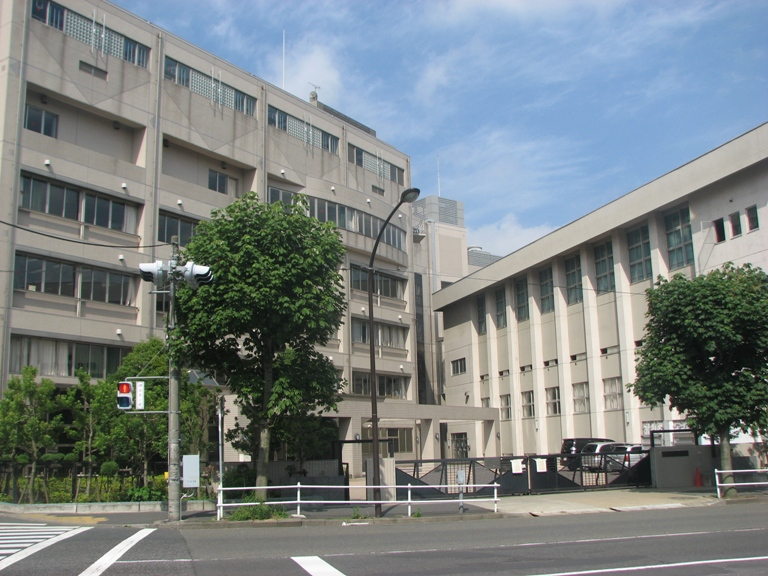
Aoyama High School (東京都立青山高等学校)

Shibuya Board of Education operates public elementary and junior high schools.

Jingūmae 1-chōme 7-20 ban, 2-chōme 1-8 and 17-ban, 3-chōme 1-17 and 29-42-ban, 4-chōme, 5-chōme 1-19 ban, and 6-chōme 1-11, 13-14, and 28-35-ban are zoned to Jingumae Elementary School (渋谷区立神宮前小学校). Jingūmae 1-chōme 1-6 and 21-24 ban, 2-chōme 9-16、18-35, and 3-chōme 18-28 ban are zoned to Sendagaya Elementary School (渋谷区立千駄谷小学校). Jingumae 5-chome 20-53 ban and 6-chome 12, and 15-27 ban are zoned to Jinnan Elementary School (神南小学校).

Jingūmae 1-4-chōme, 5-chōme 1-33 ban, and 6-chōme 1-17 and 24-35-ban are zoned to Harajuku Gaien Junior High School (原宿外苑中学校). 5-chōme 20-53 ban and 6-chōme 12 and 15-27 ban are zoned to Shoto Junior High School (渋谷区立松濤中学校).

Public elementary and junior high schools within Jingumae include:

- Harajuku-Gaien Junior High School (原宿外苑中学校) (Jingūmae 1-24-6)
- Jingumae Elementary School (渋谷区立神宮前小学校) (Jingūmae 4-20-12)

Tokyo Metropolitan Board of Education operates public high schools.

Prefectural high schools in Jingumae include:

- Aoyama High School (東京都立青山高等学校) (Jingūmae 2-1-8)

Private high schools in Jingumae include:

- Kokugakuin High School (國學院高等学校) (Jingūmae 2-2-3)
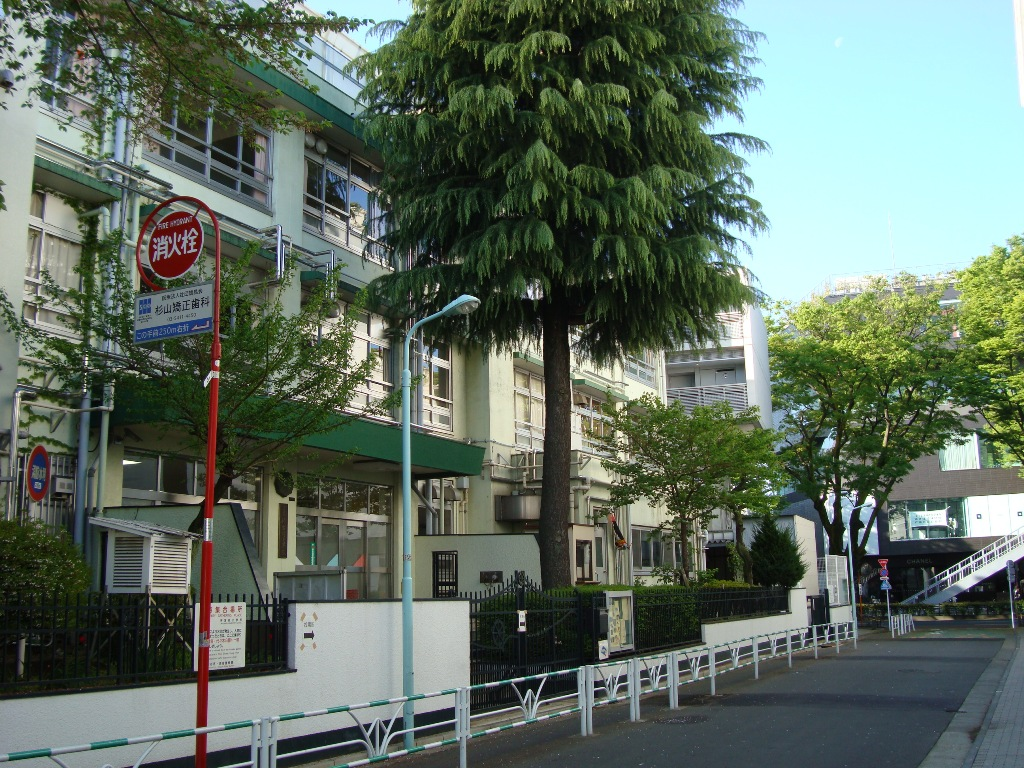
Jingumae Elementary School (渋谷区立神宮前小学校)

=== Libraries ===
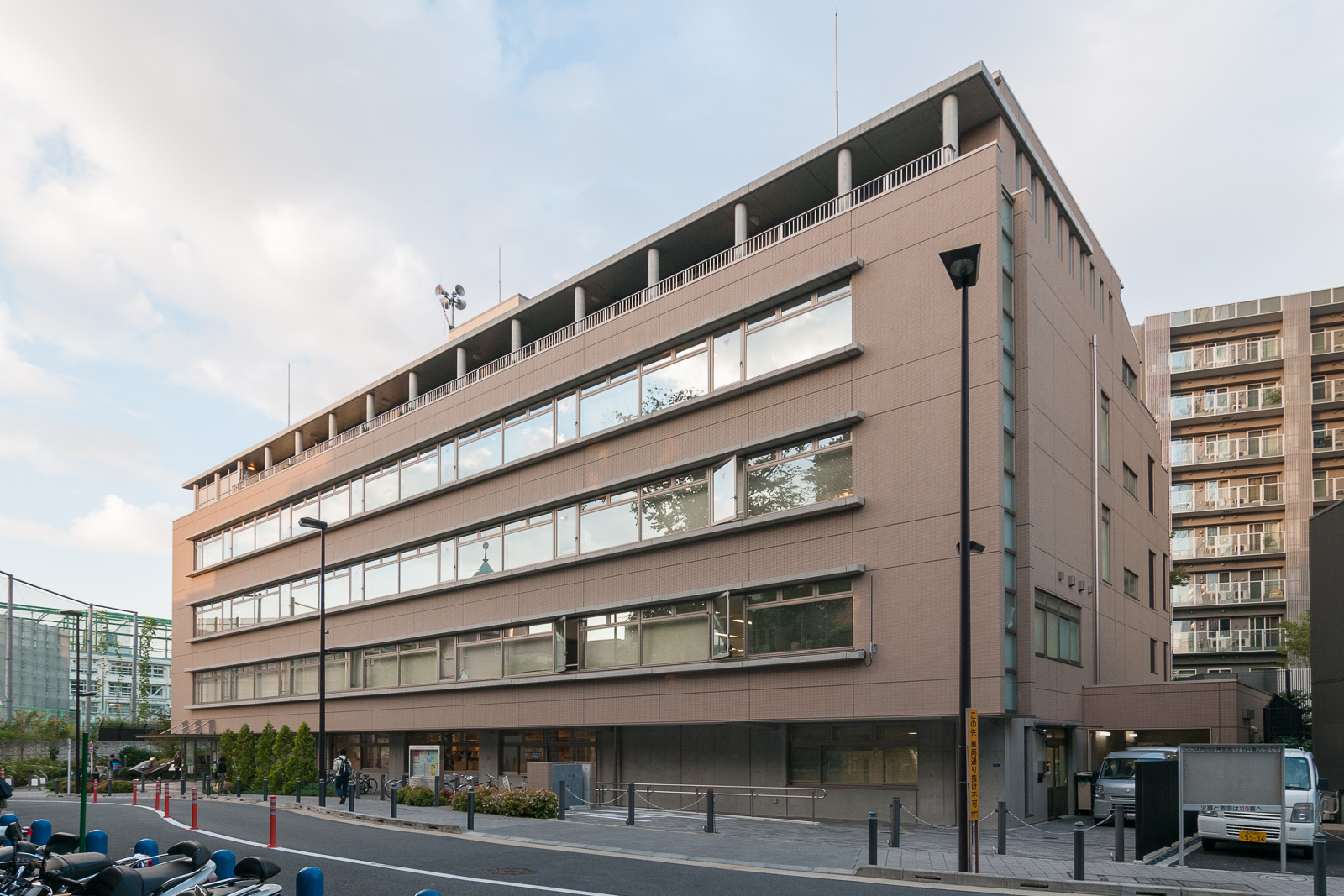
Shibuya City Central Library (渋谷区立中央図書館)

- Shibuya City Central Library (渋谷区立中央図書館) (Jingūmae 1-4-1)
