= Cat Street =

Cat Street may refer to:

- Cat Street, Tokyo
- Catte Street, Oxford, England
- Upper Lascar Row, Hong Kong
- Cat Street (manga), a Japanese manga by Yoko Kamio
