= Jun Takahashi =

Japanese fashion designer

- Born: 高橋盾 (Takahashi Jun); September 21, 1969 (age 57); Kiryū, Japan
- Other name: Jonio
- Education: Bunka Fashion College
- Occupation: Fashion designer
- Label: Undercover
- Spouse: Morishita Riko
- Children: 2

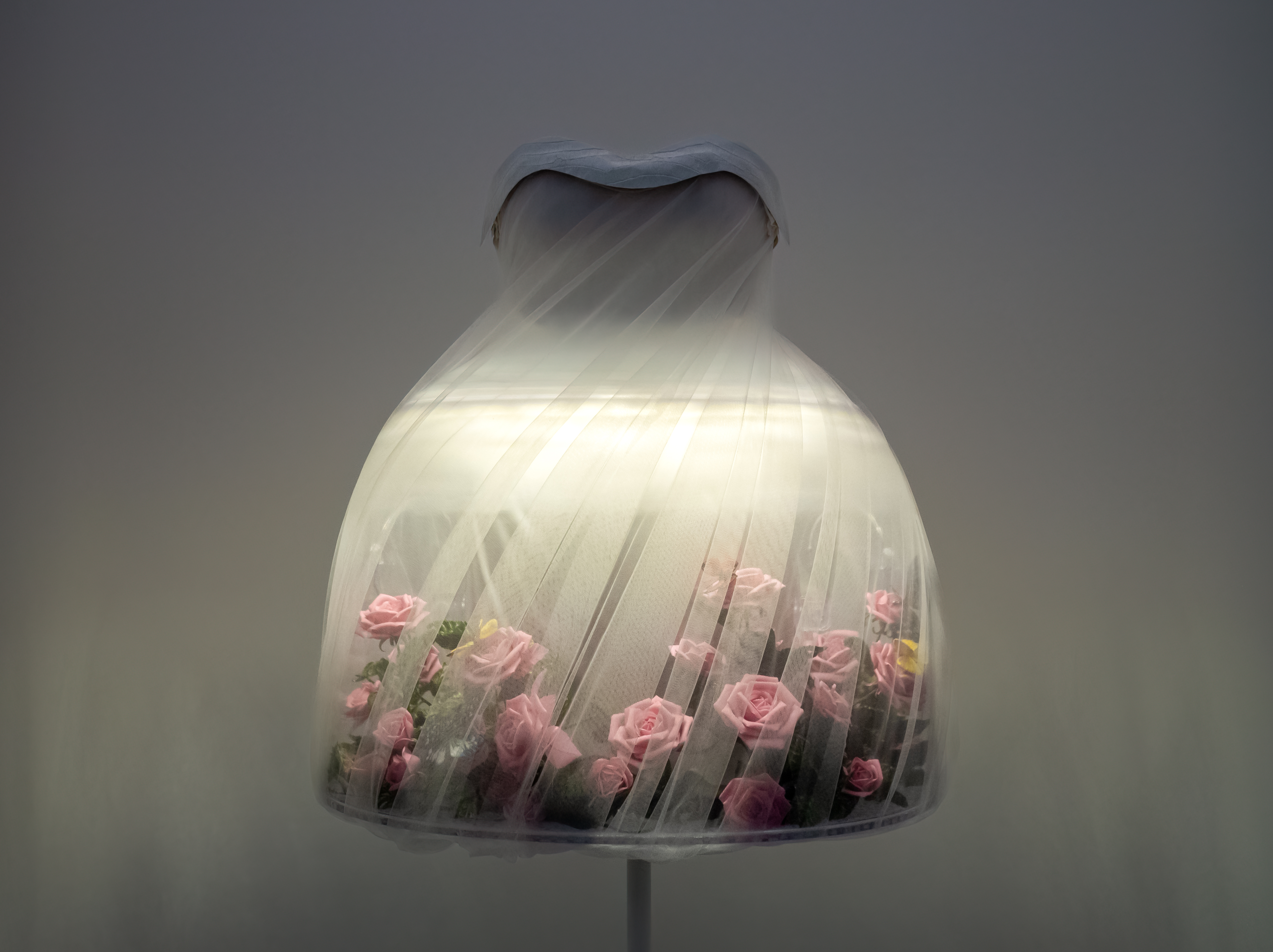
Dress for the Undercover spring/summer 2024 collection, featured in the Sleeping Beauties: Reawakening Fashion exhibition at the Metropolitan Museum of Art

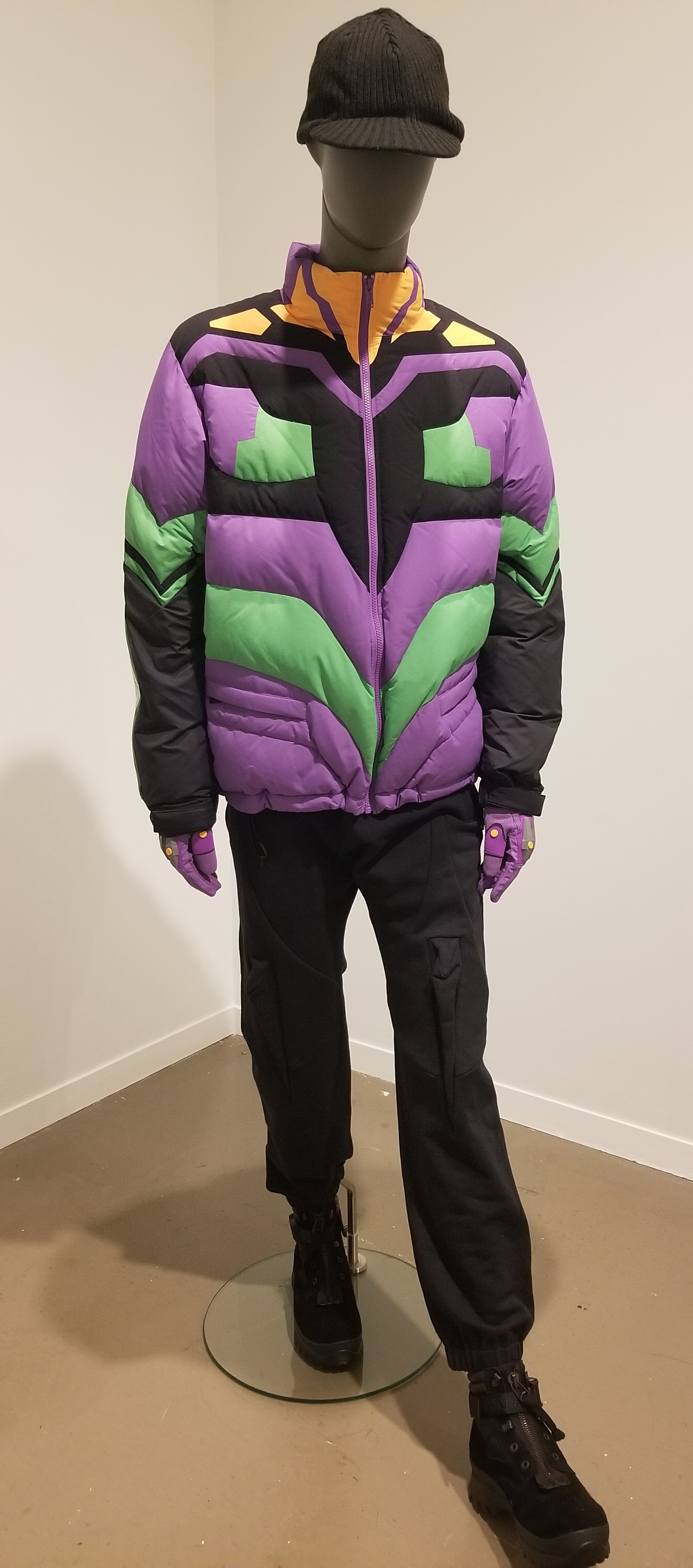
Look 27, Creep Very (Fall/Winter 2021). Collection inspired by the Neon Genesis Evangelion anime.

Jun Takahashi (高橋 盾, Takahashi Jun; IPA: [takahaɕi dʑɯɴ]; born 21 September 1969) is a Japanese fashion designer who created the brand "UnderCover" (alternatively rendered as "Under Cover" or "Undercover").

== Early life and education ==
Takahashi was born in Kiryū, Gunma. He attended Gunma Kiryu Nishi High School. In 1988, he enrolled in Fashion Education at Bunka Fashion College. In his free time, he was the vocal lead for the cover band "Tokyo Sex Pistols", where his role model was Vivienne Westwood.

== Career ==
In 1993, he launched UnderCover, a high-end streetwear label for men, women and children. Also in 1993, he launched Nowhere, a retail venture in Ura-Harajuku with his friend Nigo, the founder of BAPE. In 1994–1995 he participated in Tokyo Fashion Week. In 1995 the Nowhere Ltd. company store opened in Harajuku.

Japanese designer Rei Kawakubo who created the brand Comme des Garçons, became Jun's mentor and persuaded him to come to Paris. The Paris store Colette liked his clothes so much that they asked Takahashi to present his 1998 collection "Exchange" in their store.

UnderCover made its debut at Paris Fashion Week in October 2002, for Spring/Summer 2003.

Takahashi also creates activewear lines for men and women under the label Nike x Undercover Gyakusou, with the sportswear giant. Additionally, Takahashi has collaborated with Uniqlo to create Uniqlo UnderCover, since 2011.

In 2021, Takahashi created artwork and an animated music video for "Creep (Very 2021 Rmx)", a remixed version of the 1992 Radiohead song "Creep". Radiohead singer Thom Yorke contributed the remix to one of Takahashi's fashion shows.

In 2026, Nigo's Human Made announced plans to acquire Undercover, the fashion label founded by Takahashi. The companies initially announced a non-binding agreement in June, with the transaction planned for completion in February 2027. In September, Human Made signed a definitive share-transfer agreement to acquire 100% of Undercover's voting shares for approximately ¥538.8 million in cash. Under the planned structure, Takahashi would leave day-to-day management while remaining head designer.

== Personal life ==
Takahashi is married to Morishita Riko, with whom he worked for the Uniqlo collaboration, and has a son, Rin, and daughter, Lala.

== Awards and achievements ==
In 1997, he received the New Face Prize in Mainichi fashion grand prize sponsored by the Mainichi national daily newspaper. In 2001, he received the Grand Prize in Mainichi fashion grand prize sponsored by the Mainichi national daily newspaper. In 2013, he received the Grand Prize in Mainichi fashion grand prize for the second time.
