= Takenoko (disambiguation) =

Takenoko may refer to:

- Bamboo shoot
- Takenoko-zoku
- Takenoko (board game)
