= Ura-Harajuku =

Backstreets of Harajuku, Shibuya, Tokyo, Japan

Coordinates: 35.670162°N 139.70874°E

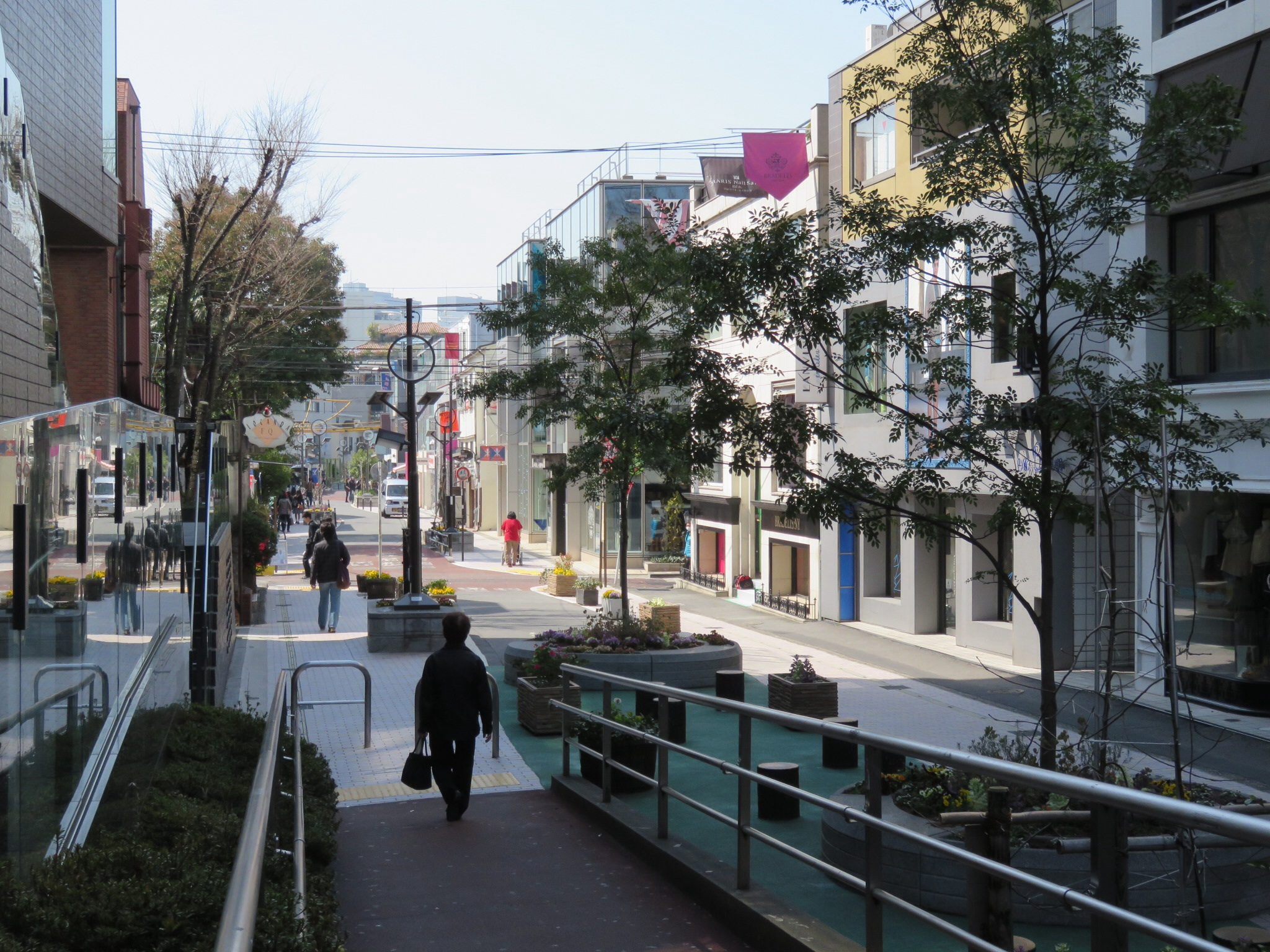
Cat Street in Ura-Harajuku

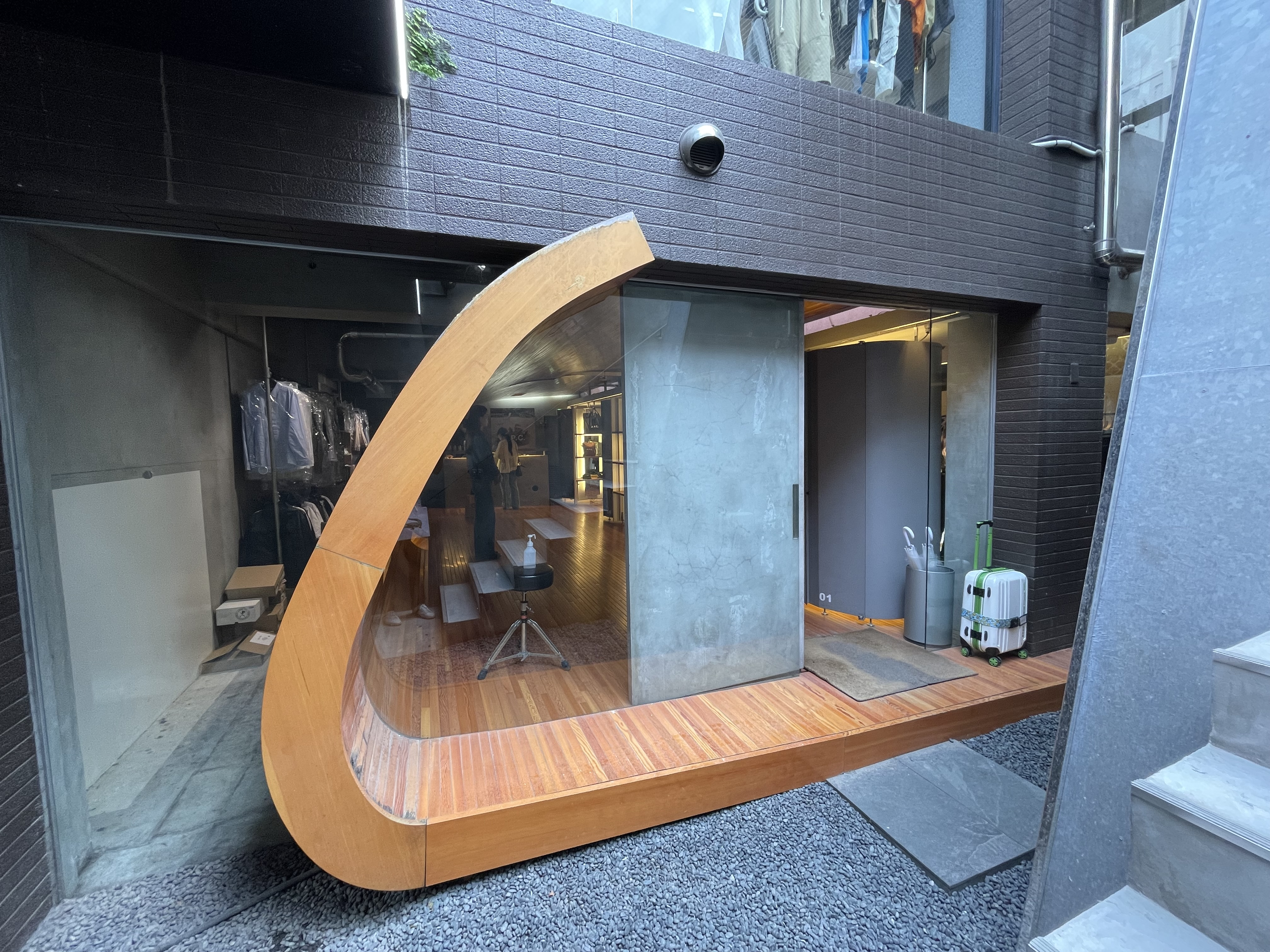
Exterior of the A.P.C. Harajuku Underground store in Ura-Harajuku, Tokyo

Ura-Harajuku (裏原宿) is the nickname of an area in Shibuya, Tokyo, Japan.

Ura-Harajuku, or Ura-Hara, is the common name given to the network of smaller Harajuku backstreets spreading perpendicular to Omotesandō, corresponding on official maps of Shibuya ward as Jingūmae 3 chōme and 4 chōme.

Ura-Harajuku contrasts with the main vehicle thoroughfares and retail offerings of Harajuku being mostly pedestrianized and showcasing smaller independent shops and dining options. Cat Street, following the course of the main Shibuya River tributary, is the principal route through this district spreading from Sendagaya in the north towards Shibuya in the south.

== See also ==
- Japanese street fashion
- Hiroshi Fujiwara
- Jun Takahashi
- A Bathing Ape
- Visvim
