= Harajuku =

District in Shibuya, Tokyo, Japan

Harajuku 原宿
- Urban area
- Jingūmae 1 chōme to 4 chōme
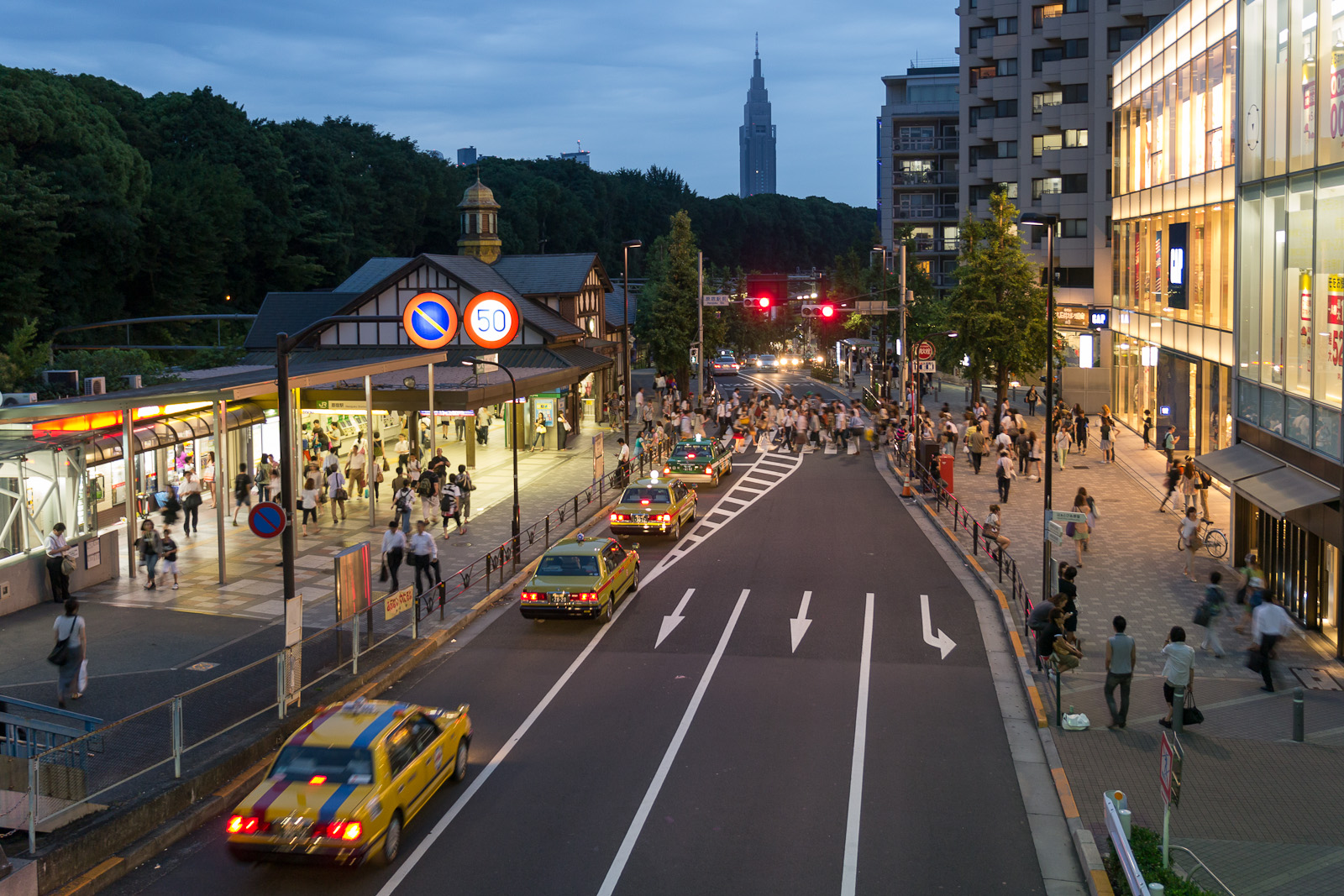
- The old Harajuku Station (left), with Meiji Shrine forest as background

- Location within Special wards of Tokyo Location within Tokyo Location within Japan
- Coordinates: 35°40′07″N 139°42′19″E
- Country: Japan
- City: Tokyo
- Ward: Shibuya

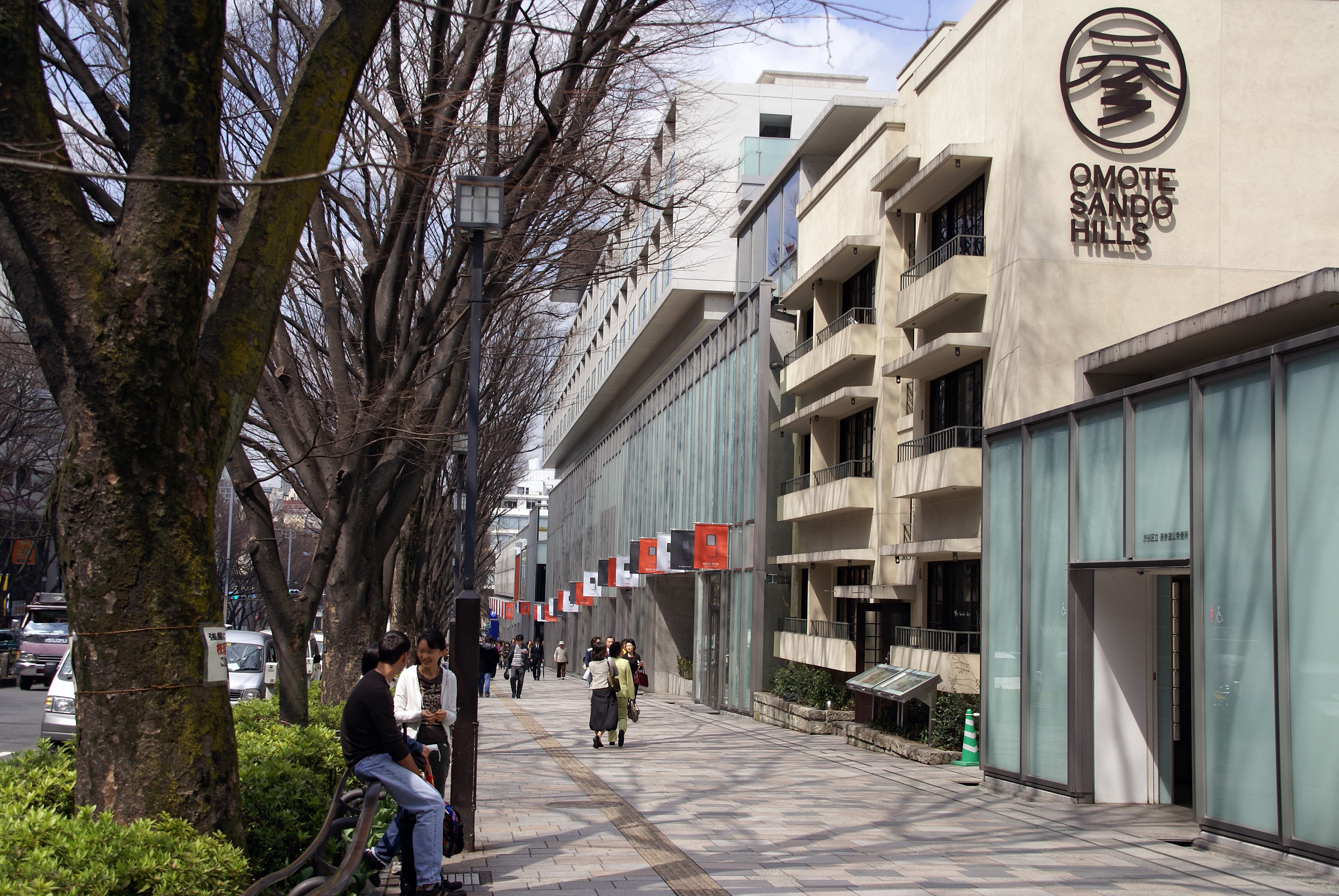
Omotesando Hills, Jingumae

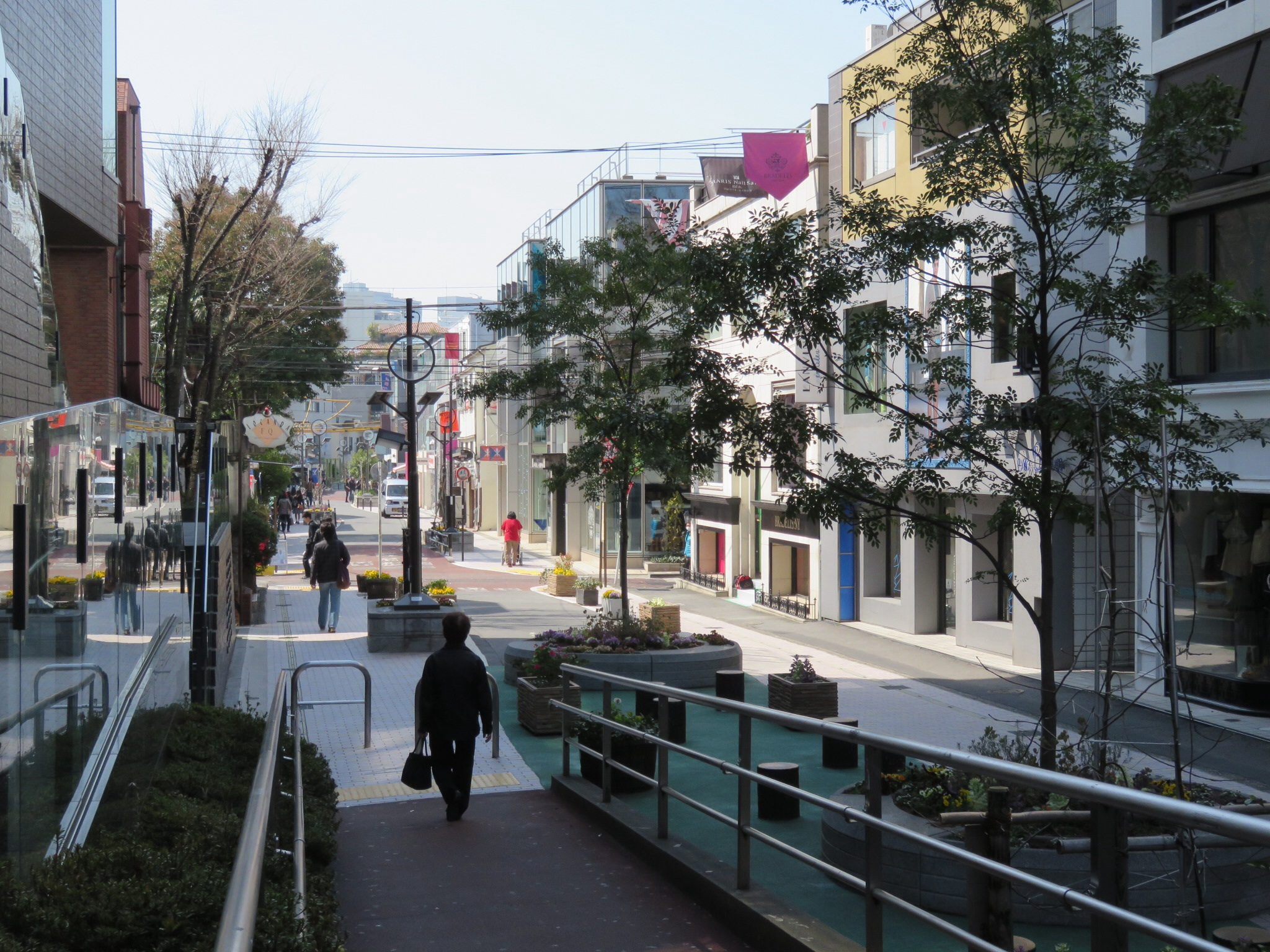
Cat Street, Ura-Harajuku

Harajuku (原宿; [haɾa(d)ʑɯkɯ]) is a district in Shibuya, Tokyo. Harajuku is the common name given to a geographic area spreading from Harajuku Station to Omotesando, corresponding on official maps of Shibuya ward as Jingūmae 1 chōme to 4 chōme. In popular reference, Harajuku also encompasses many smaller backstreets such as Takeshita Street and Cat Street spreading from Sendagaya in the north to Shibuya in the south.

Harajuku is known internationally as a center of Japanese youth culture and fashion. Shopping and dining options include many small, youth-oriented, independent boutiques and cafés, but the neighborhood also attracts many larger international chain stores with high-end luxury merchandisers extensively represented along Omotesando.

Harajuku Station on the East Japan Railway (JR East) Yamanote Line and Meiji-jingumae 'Harajuku' Station served by the Tokyo Metro Chiyoda Line and Tokyo Metro Fukutoshin Line also act as gateways to local attractions such as the Meiji Shrine, Yoyogi Park and Yoyogi National Gymnasium, making Harajuku and its environs one of the most popular destinations in Tokyo for both domestic and international tourists.

== History ==
=== Pre-Edo period ===
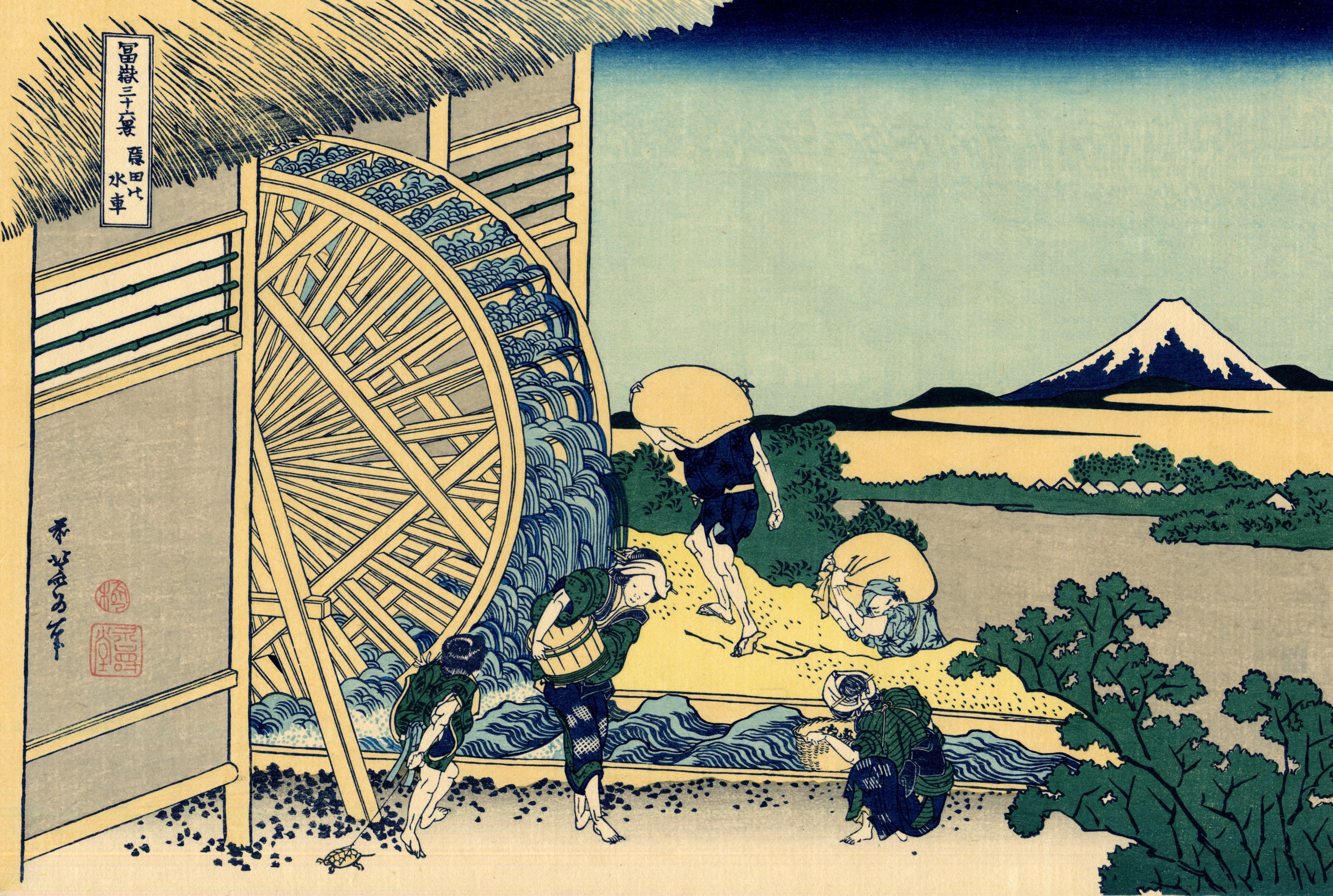
Watermill at Onden, (tributary of the Shibuya River) by Hokusai, part of the Thirty-six Views of Mount Fuji series

In the pre-Edo period, the area that came to be known as Harajuku was a small post town on the Kamakura Highway. It was said that in the Gosannen War, Minamoto no Yoshiie mustered his soldiers in this area and the hill here is called Seizoroi-saka (current Jingūmae 2 chōme). It is said that as the Igagoe reward for delivering Ieyasu Tokugawa safely from Sakai to Mikawa in the 1582 Honno-ji Incident, Onden-mura (隠田村) together with Harajuku-mura (原宿村) were given to the Iga ninja in 1590.

In the Edo period, an Iga clan residence was put in Harajuku to defend Edo, due to its strategic location south of the Koshu Road. Other than the mansion of the Hiroshima Domain feudal lord Asano (current Jingūmae 4 and 5 chōme), there were many mansions of shogunate retainers.

The livelihood of the farmers consisted mainly of rice cleaning and flour milling with the watermill at the Shibuya River. However, due to the poor quality of the land, production never succeeded and the villages never prospered. It is said that local farmers often performed rain-making invocations at local shrines in an attempt to improve their fortunes. There are also the tales Oyama-Afuri Shrine of Tanzawa and Worship on the day trip to Mt Haruna remaining.

=== Meiji Restoration to the end of the Second World War (1868–1945) ===
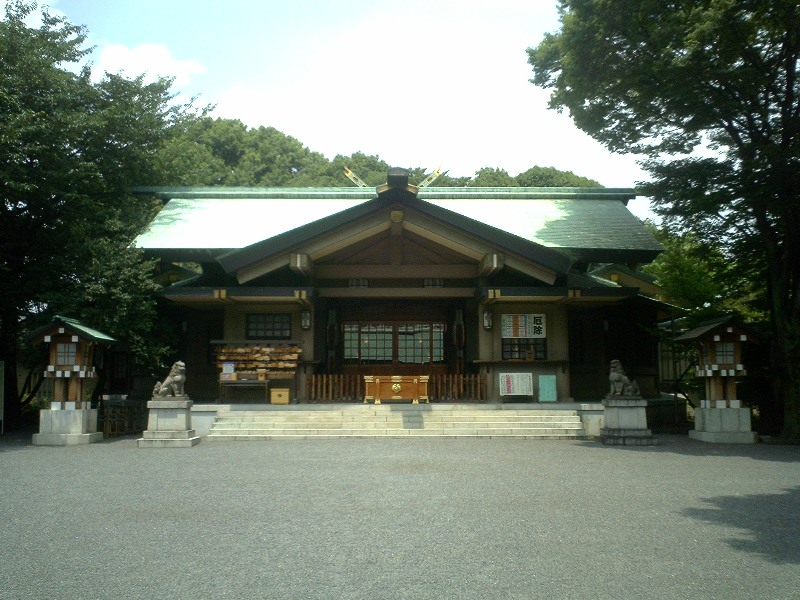
Tōgō Shrine

At the start of the Meiji period in 1868, the land around Harajuku Village was owned by the shogunate. In November of the same year, the towns and villages of Shibuya Ward, including Harajuku Village, were placed under the jurisdiction of the Tokyo Prefecture.

In 1906, Harajuku Station was opened as a part of the expansion of the Yamanote Line. In 1919, with the establishment of Meiji Shrine, Omotesando was widened and reordered as a formal approach route.

In 1943, the Tōgō Shrine was built and consecrated in honor of Imperial Japanese Navy Marshal-Admiral Marquis Tōgō Heihachirō.

In the final period of the Pacific War in 1945, much of the area was burned to the ground during the Great Tokyo Air Raid.

=== 1945 to 1970 ===
During the postwar occupation, military housing in the area named Washington Heights was constructed on land now occupied by Yoyogi Park and the Yoyogi National Gymnasium. Shops that appealed to the US soldiers and their families, such as Kiddyland, Oriental Bazaar, and the Fuji Tori, opened along Omotesando during this period.

In 1964, swimming, diving, and basketball events for the Tokyo Olympics were held at nearby Yoyogi National Gymnasium.

In 1965, the name of the area in the Japanese address system was officially changed from Harajuku to Jingumae. The name Harajuku has persisted due to the earlier naming of the nearby JR East Harajuku Station. Prior to 1965, Onden, referred to the low-lying area close to Meiji Street and the Shibuya River while "Harajuku" referred to the northern end of Omotesando, the plateau around Aoyama, currently known as Jingu-mae block 2, a large area of Jingu-mae block 3, and the plateau extending behind Togo Shrine in Jingu-mae block 1. The area from Harajuku station to the area surrounding Takeshita Street was called "Takeshita-cho".

=== 1970s and 1980s ===
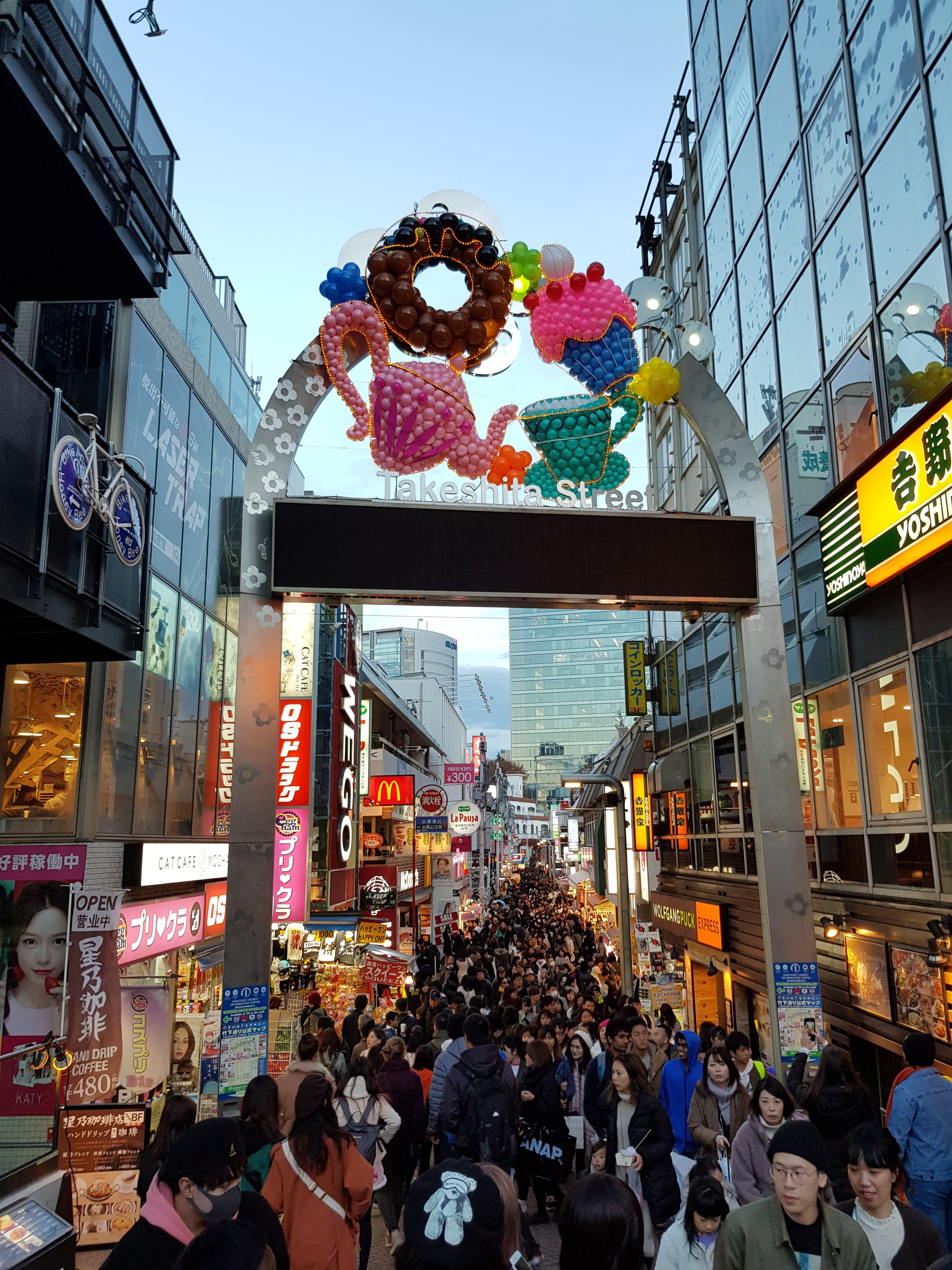
Takeshita Street

Coming into the 1970s, fashion-obsessed youth culture experienced a transition, from Shinjuku to Harajuku, then to Shibuya. Palais France, a building that sold fashion clothing and accessories, furniture, and other goods, was constructed on Meiji Street near the exit of Takeshita Street. In 1978, the fashion building Laforet Harajuku was opened; thus, Harajuku came to be widely known as a fashion and retail centre.

In the 1980s, Takeshita Street became known for teenage street dancing groups called takenoko-zoku.

From 1977, a Sundays-only pedestrian precinct was established by closing local roads. This produced a surge in people gathering close to entrances of Yoyogi Park to watch rock 'n' rollers and other new bands performing impromptu open-air gigs. In the peak period, crowds of up to 10,000 people would gather. In 1998, the Sundays-only pedestrian zone was abolished.

=== 1990s to present ===
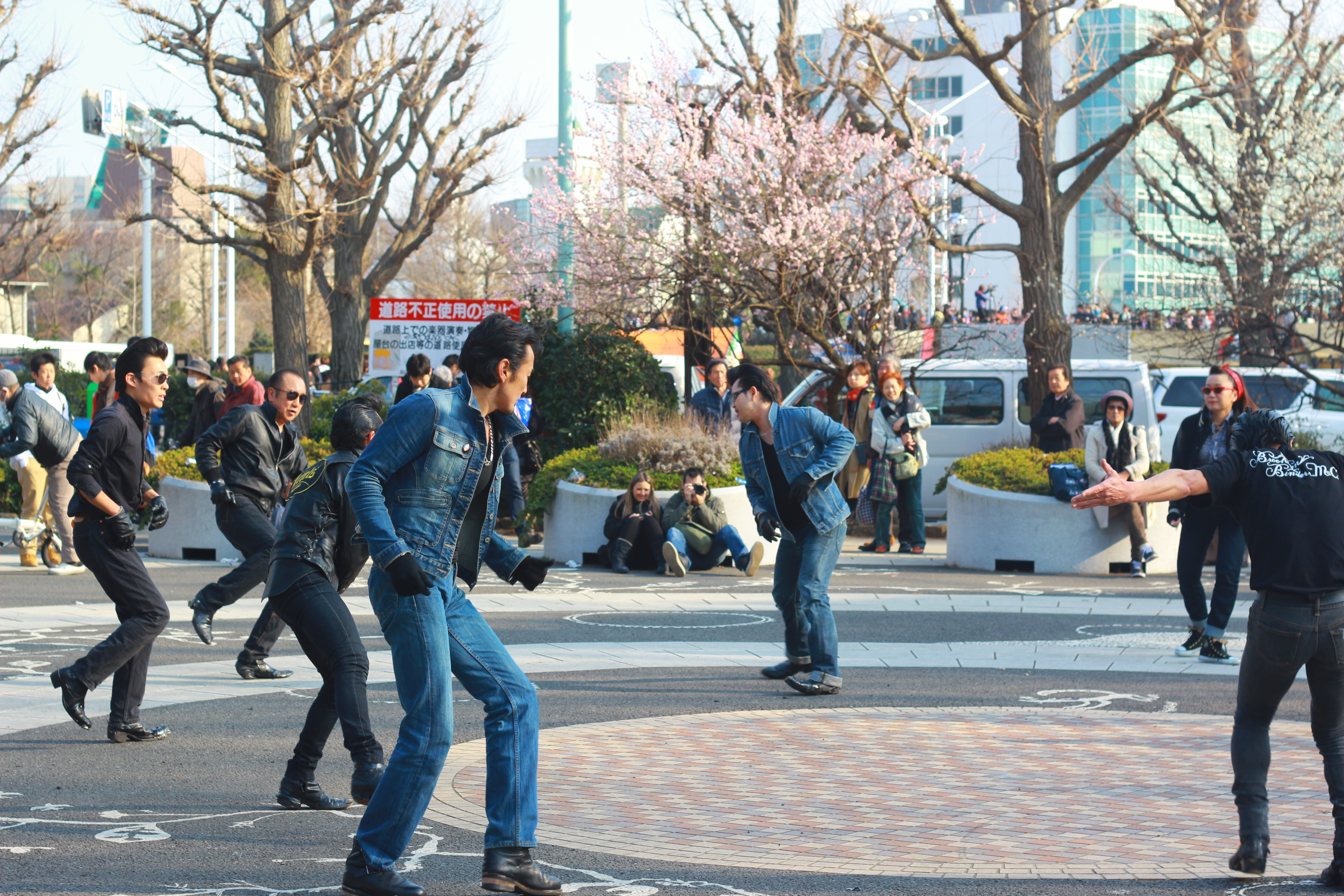
Rockabillies dancing in Yoyogi Park on a Sunday in March 2014

In the 1990s and 2000s, with the rise of fast fashion, there was an influx of international fashion brand flagship store openings including Gap Inc., Forever 21, Uniqlo, Topshop and H&M. At the same time, new independent fashion trend shops spread into the previously residential areas of Jingumae 3 and 4 chome, with this area becoming known as Ura-Harajuku (the "Harajuku Backstreets").

In 2006, Omotesando Hills opened, replacing the Dōjunkai apartments on Omotesando.

In 2008, the Tokyo Metro Fukutoshin Line opened, providing alternative metro access linking Harajuku to Shibuya and Ikebukuro.

=== 2019 New Year's Day terrorist attack ===
During the early morning of January 1, 2019, a 21-year-old man named Kazuhiro Kusakabe drove his Kei car into the crowd of pedestrians celebrating New Year's Day on Takeshita Street. The man claimed his actions were a terrorist attack, and later stated that his intention was to retaliate against the usage of the death penalty. The man attempted to flee from the scene but was soon apprehended by authorities in a nearby park.

== Sightseeing and local landmarks ==
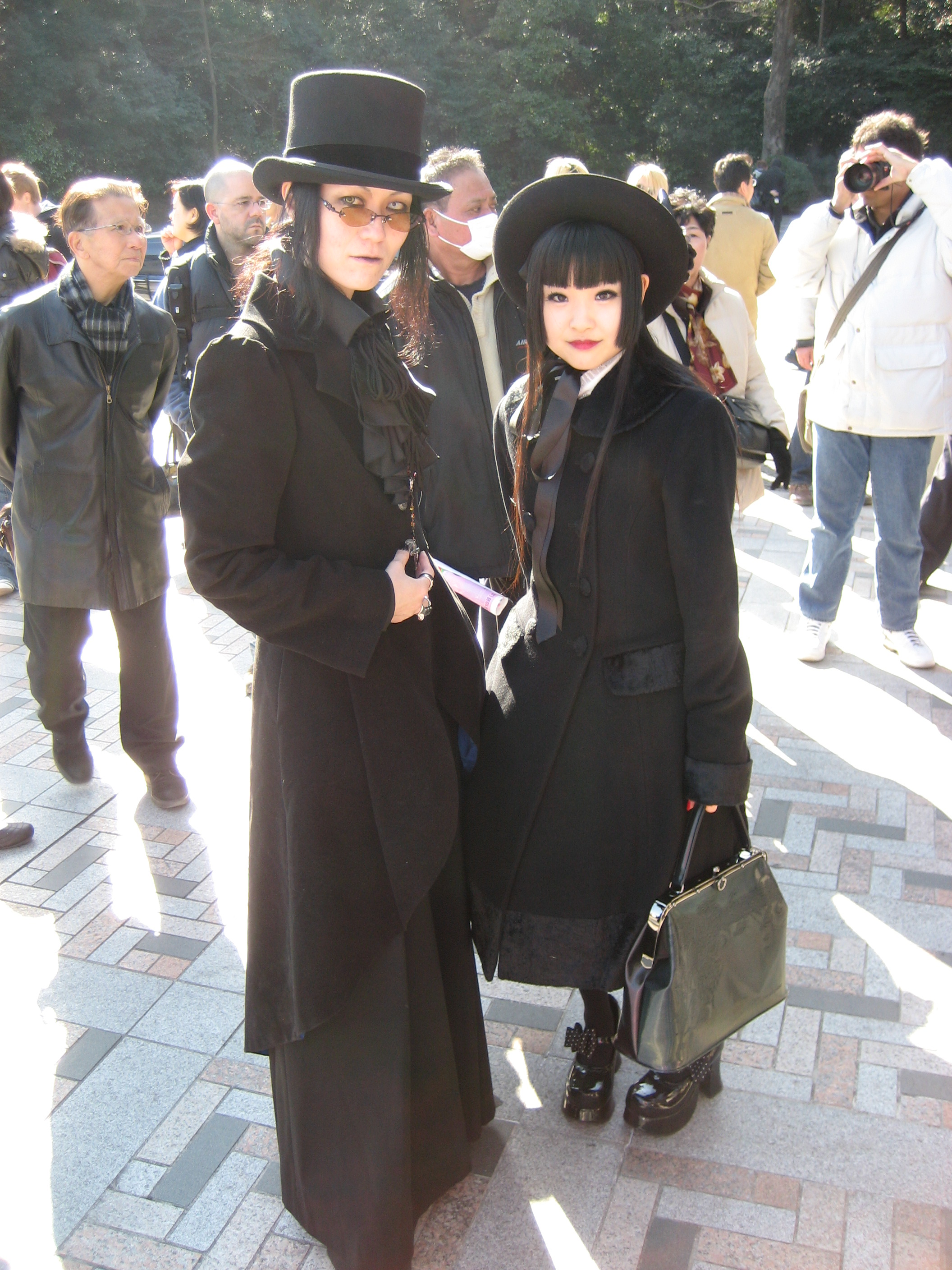
Aristocrat and Gothic Lolita styles on display at Jingu Bashi in 2007

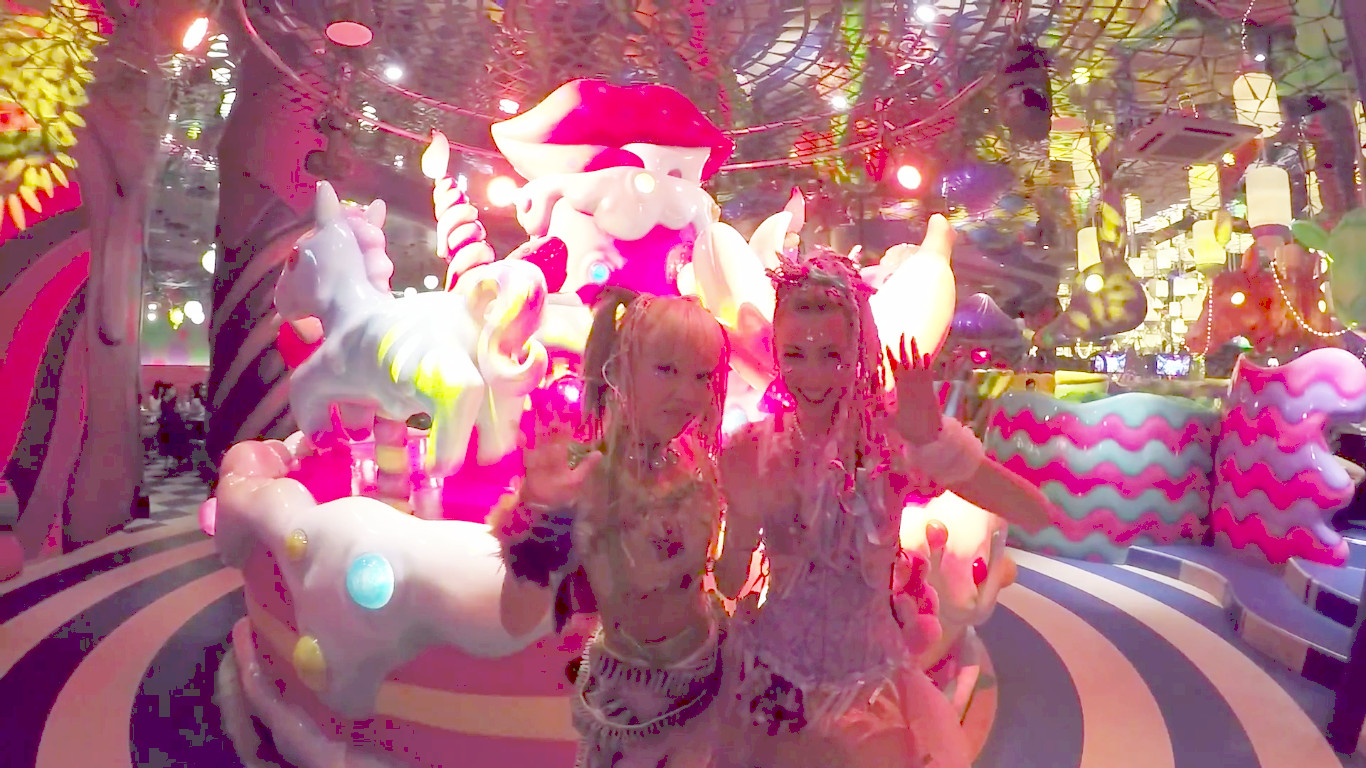
Kawaii Monster Cafe

Harajuku is a retail fashion and dining destination in its own right, but still earns much of its wider reputation as a gathering place for fans and aficionados of Japanese street fashion and associated subcultures. Jingu Bashi, the pedestrian bridge between Harajuku Station and the entrance to the Meiji Shrine, used to act as a gathering place on Sundays to showcase some of the more theatrical styles. Another gathering place was the lower part of Omotesandō avenue, which used to be pedestrian-only ("Hokosha Tengoku") on Sundays.

Other local landmarks include:

- Meiji Shrine, a large Shinto shrine located in an evergreen forest and dedicated to the deified spirits of Emperor Meiji and his wife, Empress Shōken
- Yoyogi Park
- Yoyogi National Gymnasium, designed by Kenzo Tange to host swimming and diving events at the 1964 Summer Olympics
- Omotesando
- Ura-Harajuku
- Laforet Harajuku
- Omotesando Hills
- Tōgō Shrine
- Ukiyo-e Ōta Memorial Museum of Art
- Nezu Museum

== Former landmark buildings ==
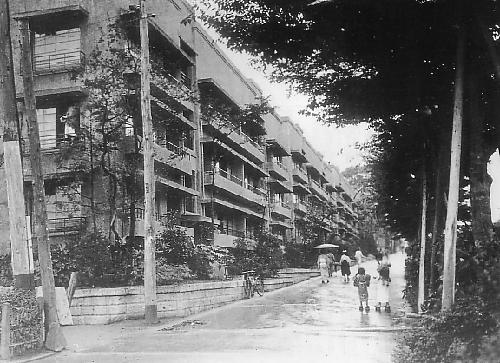
Since-demolished Dōjunkai Apartments on Omotesando

- Dōjunkai Apartments, a 1927 building replaced in 2005 by Tadao Ando-designed Omotesando Hills
- Drive-in Route 5 (Now LaforetHarajuku)
- Octagonal Pavilion (the only Korean BBQ restaurant in Harajuku district in the 1960s; presently the Octagonal Building)
- Palais France
- Harajuku Central Apartments (demolished)
- Hanae Mori Building (demolished)
- Omotesando Vivre
- Mother and Child Department Store Harajuku Carillon (Now Forever 21)
- WC Harajuku Wego store by Chinatsu Wakatsuki
- P.G.C.D. Head Office
- Menard BilecHarajukuLuseine Store
- N's game Omotesando branch
- Resona Bank Harajuku Branch (Now I.T.'S. International)
- Kokudo Head Office
- Bureau of Transportation Hospital (Now the Bureau of Transportation, Tokyo Metropolitan Government)
- Kawaii Monster Cafe is designed by designer Sebastian Masuda and presents a variety of unique menus.
- Tomodachiga Yatteru Cafe

== Transport ==
=== Rail ===
- Harajuku Station (JR East Yamanote Line), including the Imperial Station.
- Meiji-jingumae 'Harajuku' Station (Tokyo Metro Chiyoda Line, Tokyo Metro Fukutoshin Line).

=== Road ===
- Meiji Street
- Omotesando Street
- Gaien-nishi Street

== See also ==
- Fruits, magazine covering Harajuku street fashion
