= Jingūbashi =

Bridge tourist attraction

Jingu Bashi 神宮橋
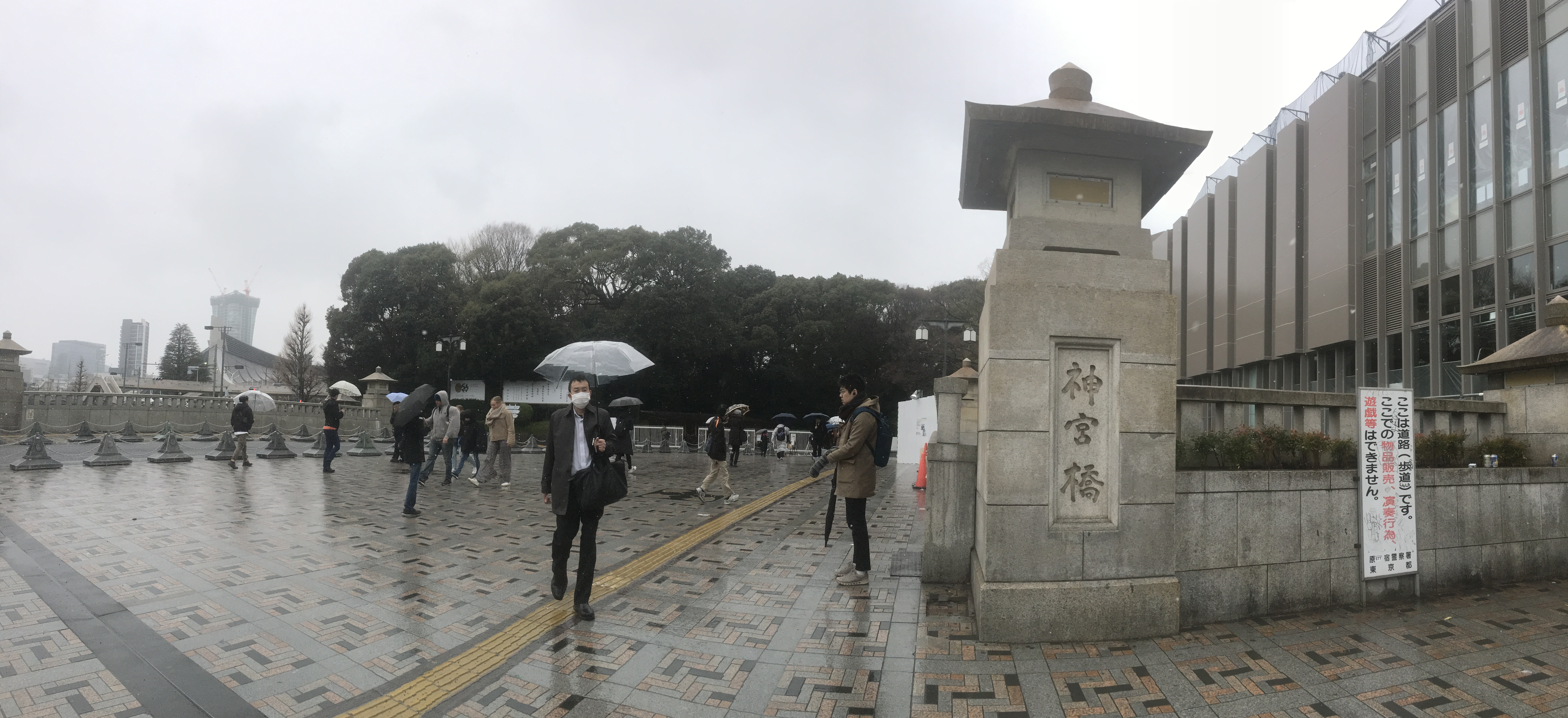
- The bridge on a rainy day, 2020
- Coordinates: 35°40′11″N 139°42′08″E
- Carries: Traffic
- Crosses: Yamanote Line
- Other name: Shrine Bridge
- Followed by: The original bridge

Characteristics
- Material: Reinforced concrete
- Total length: 20.4-metre
- Width: 29.1-metre

History
- Opened: 1982

Location
- Interactive map of Jingu Bashi

Jingūbashi (神宮橋, Jingūbashi), lit. Shrine Bridge, also known as Harajuku Bridge or Harajuku Cosplay Bridge, is a bridge that passes over the Yamanote Line between Harajuku Station and the entrance to the Meiji Shrine in Tokyo, Japan. Formerly a pedestrian bridge, it is now open to traffic. With its wide pedestrian area, it is well known as a spot for cosplayers and fashion performers, which in turn led to it becoming a tourist attraction.

== History and technical specifications ==
Jingūbashi is a 20.4-metre (67 ft)-long, 29.1-metre (95 ft)-wide bridge made out of reinforced concrete. It dates from 1982, when it replaced the original bridge that had opened in September 1920. The original bridge was one of the first reinforced concrete bridges in Japan. The current bridge inherits the design and some of the elements of the original bridge, such as the ornamental railing pillars.

== Cultural significance ==
The Harajuku area is known internationally as a center of Japanese youth culture and fashion. Jingu Bridge has become one of the locality's popular landmarks. Since the 1960s, it has attracted numerous cosplayers, performers, people dressed in visual kei, lolita fashion (sometimes in gothic variations), or similar outfits, and tourists.

The area was pedestrian-only and closed to motor-vehicles until 1995; the opening of the area to motor vehicles has been credited with lessening the popularity of the area. Jingu Bridge itself has become somewhat less popular in the second decade of the 21st century, with a 2017 CNN guide suggesting that "it's been noted that Harajuku Girls no longer gather in large numbers on Jingu Bridge ... these days".

== Gallery ==
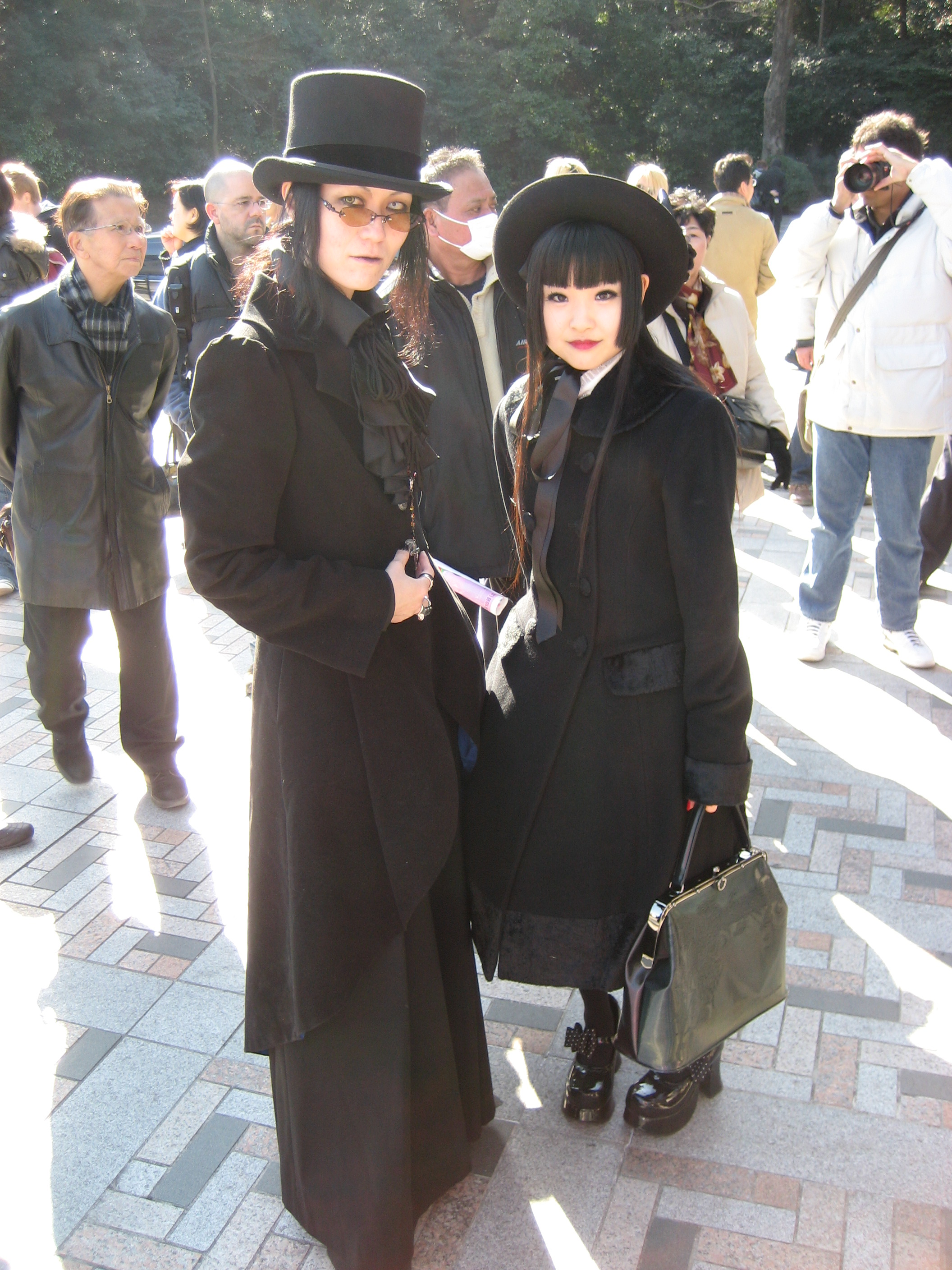
Gothic Lolita and Aristocrat styles at Jingu Bashi in 2007

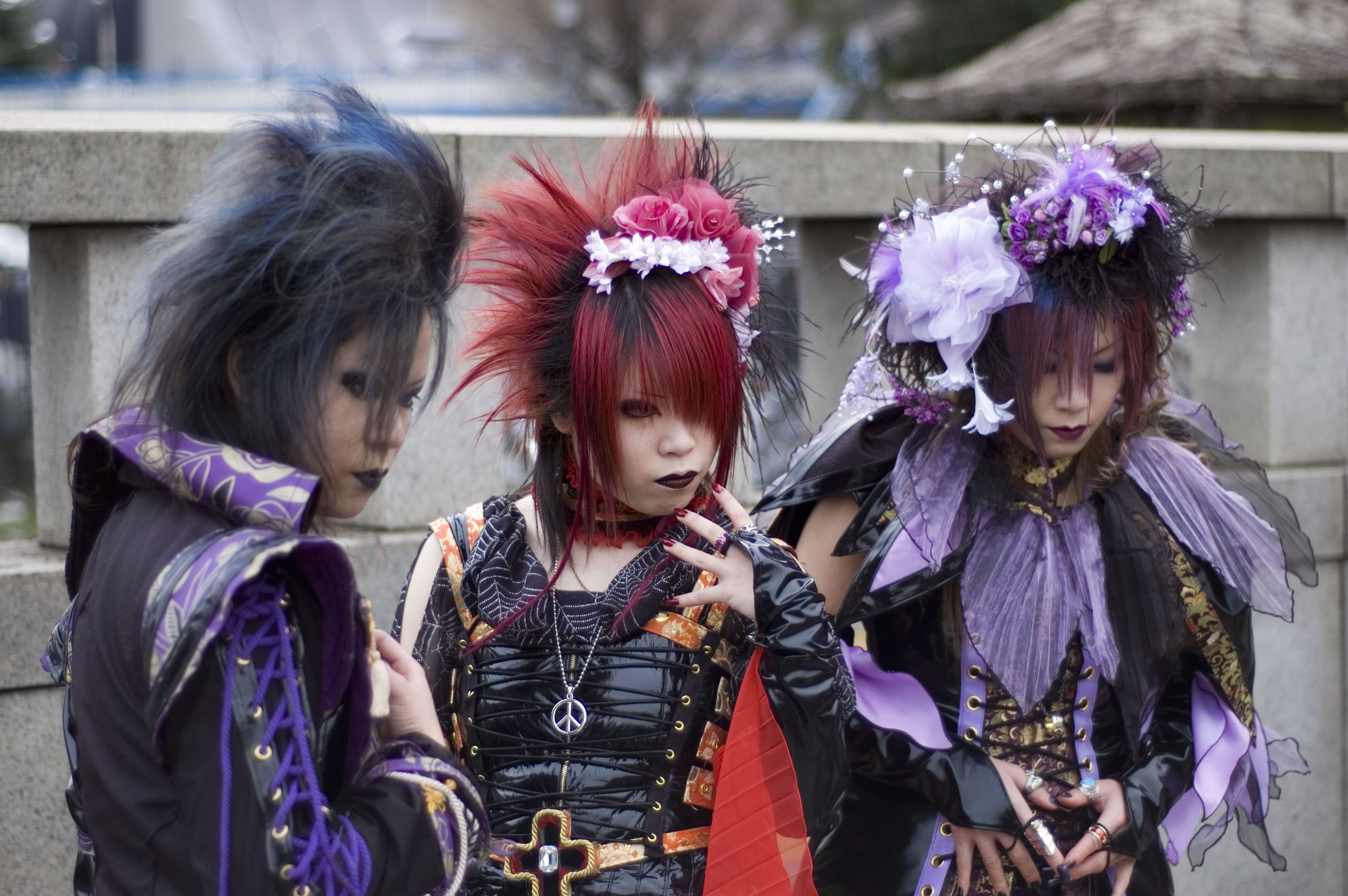
People dressed in visual kei style at Jingu Bashi in 2006

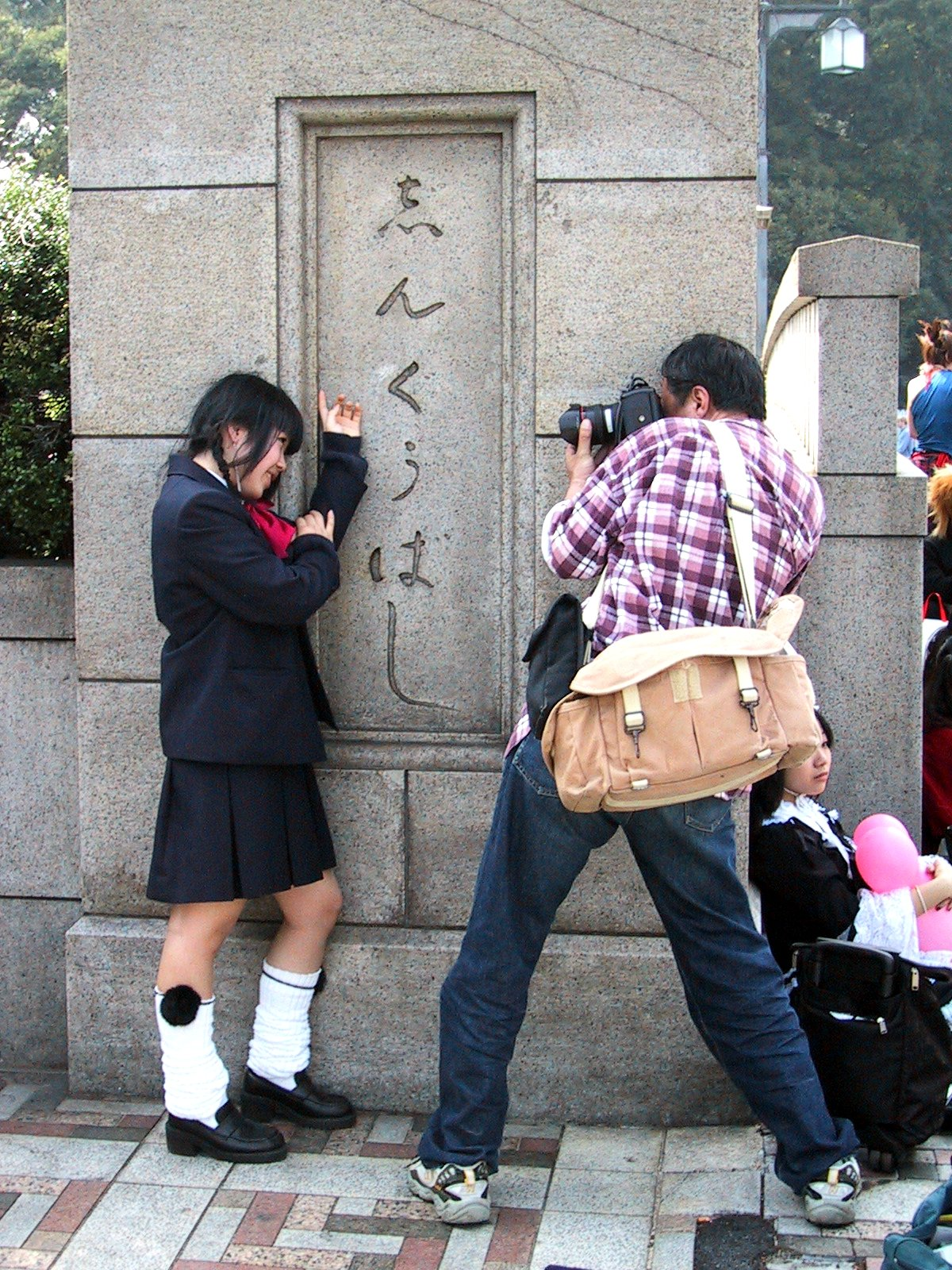
Cosplayer and photographer at Jingu Bashi in 2004

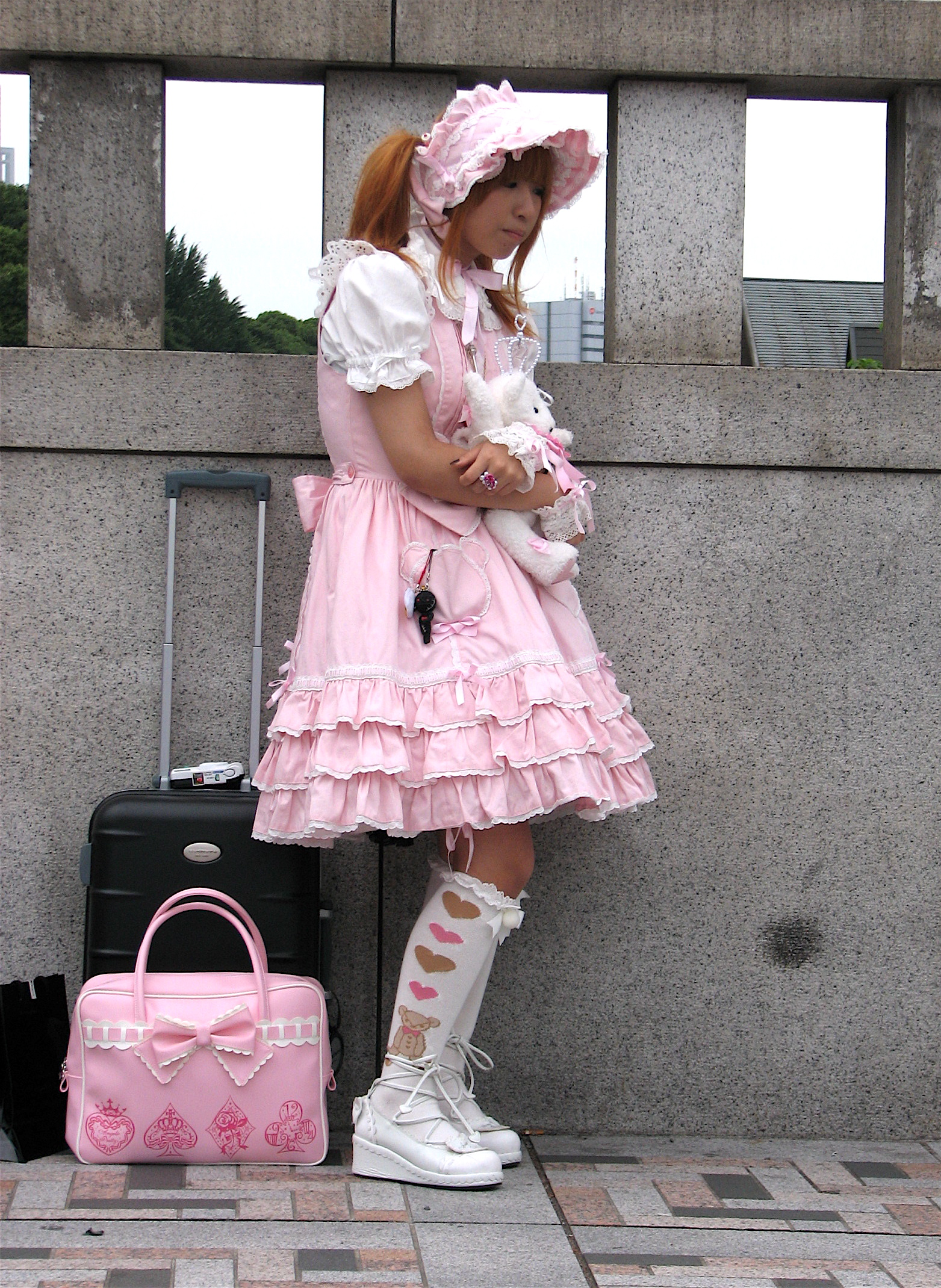
Lolita style on display at Jingu Bashi in 2007

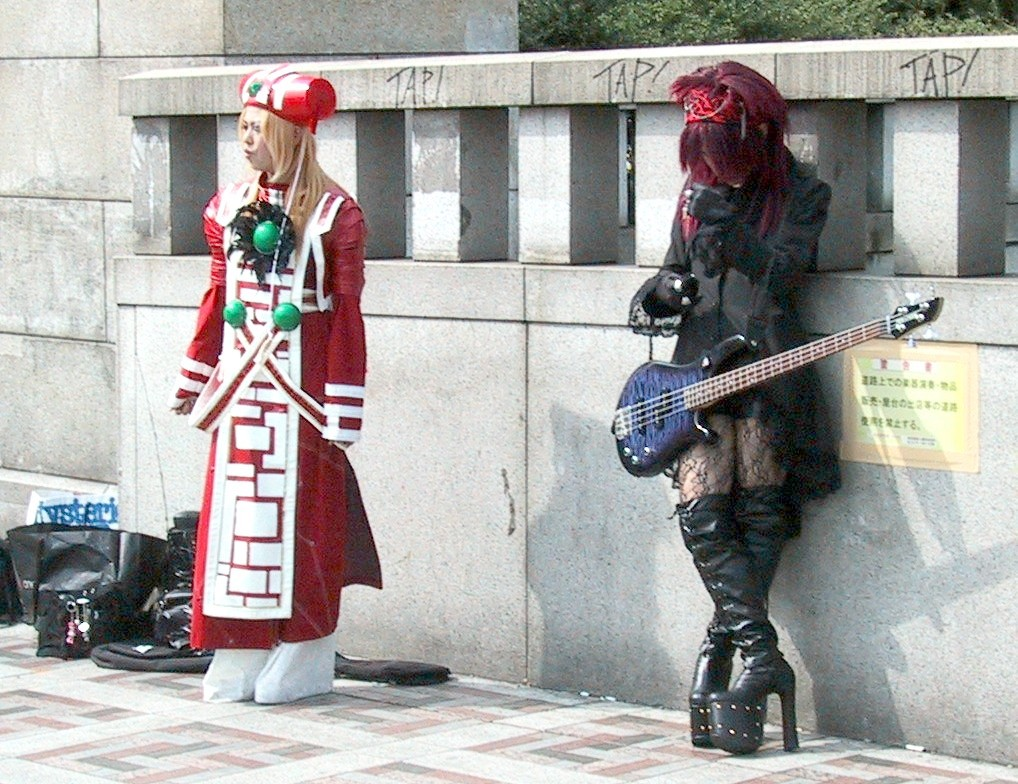
Cosplayers on display at Jingu Bashi, 2004

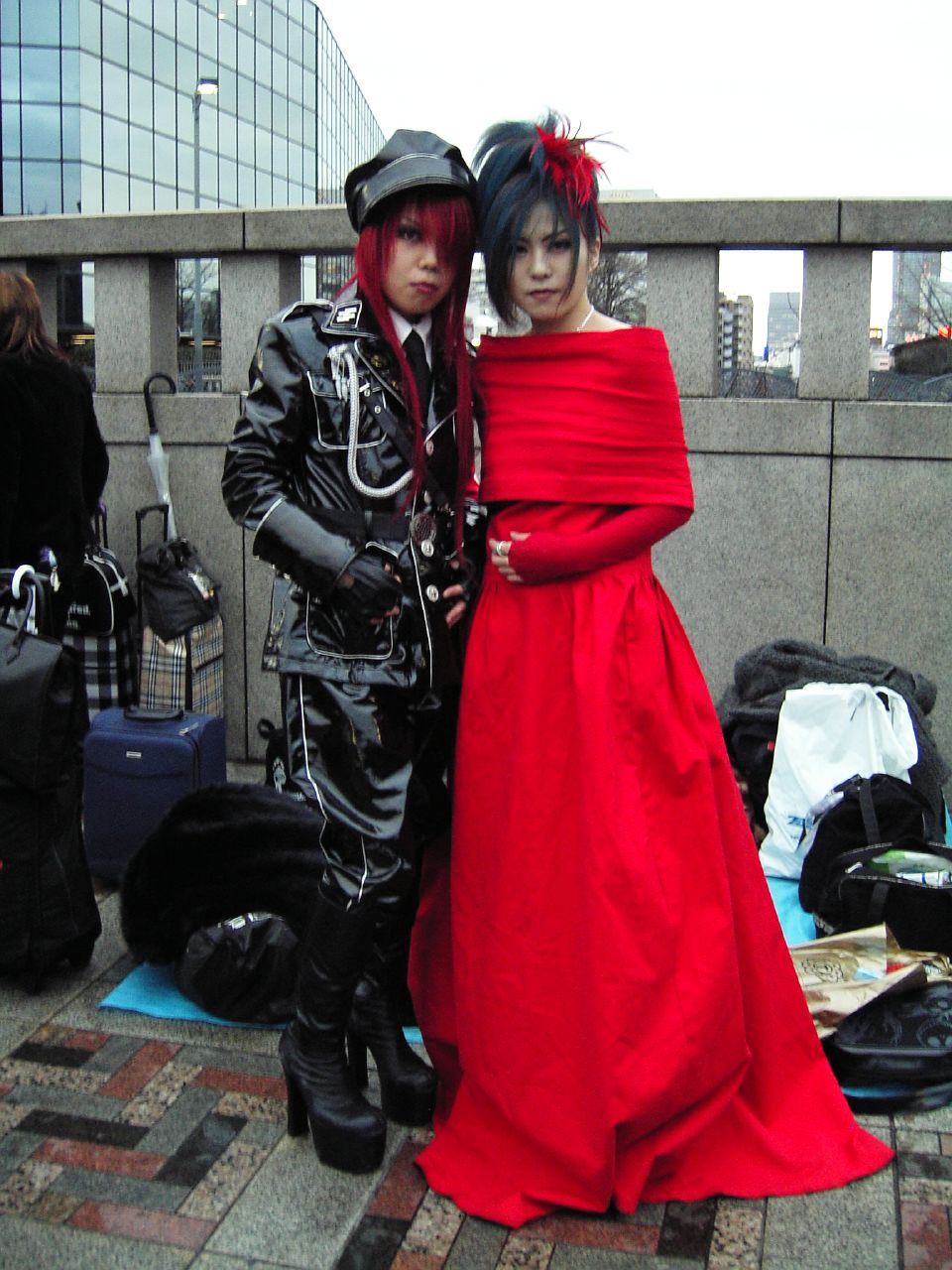
Cosplayers on display at Jingu Bashi in 2005

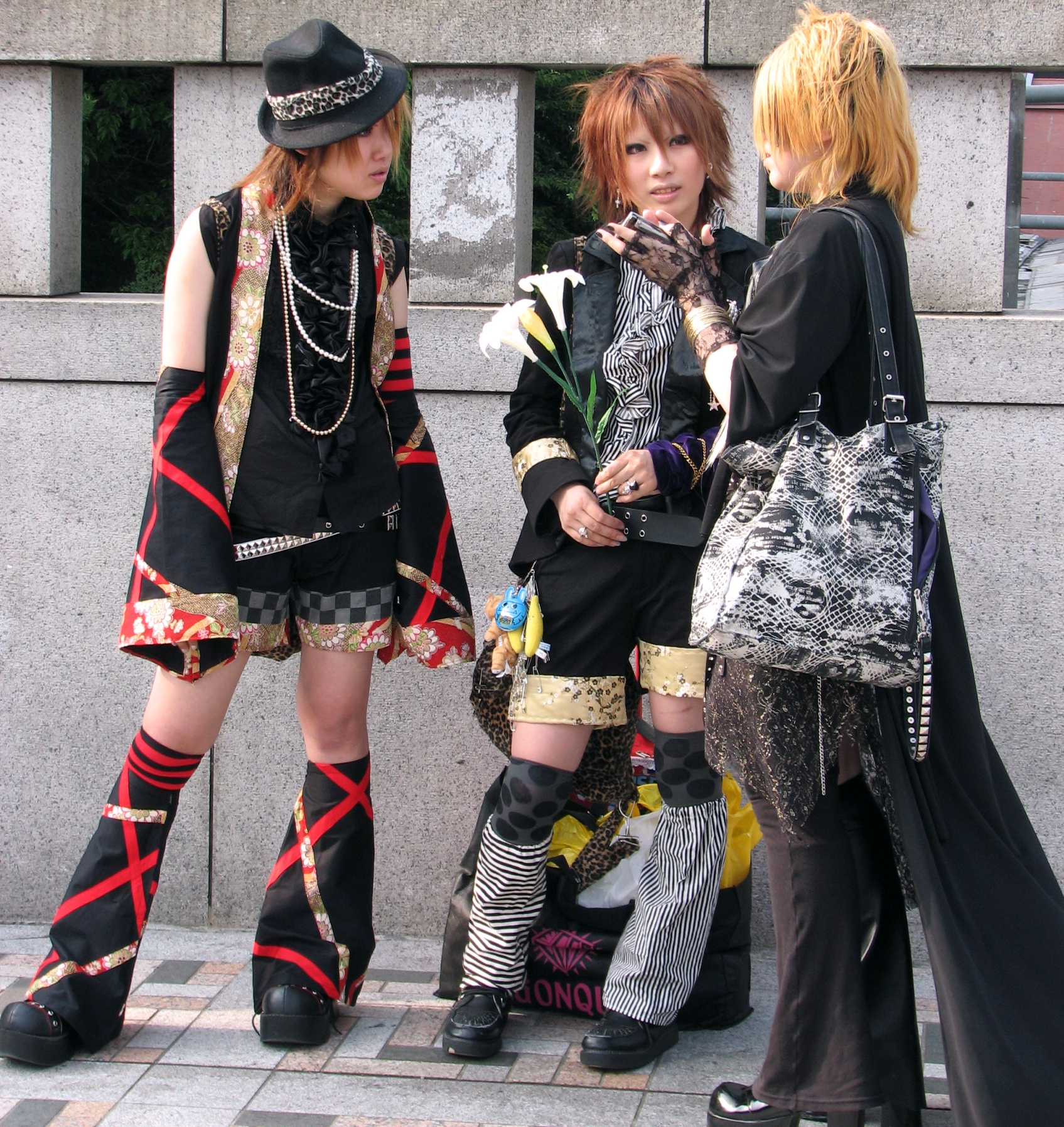
Several people in 2007
