= Nogi Shrine (Tokyo) =

Shinto shrine in Tokyo, Japan

Nogi Shrine (乃木神社, Nogi-jinja)
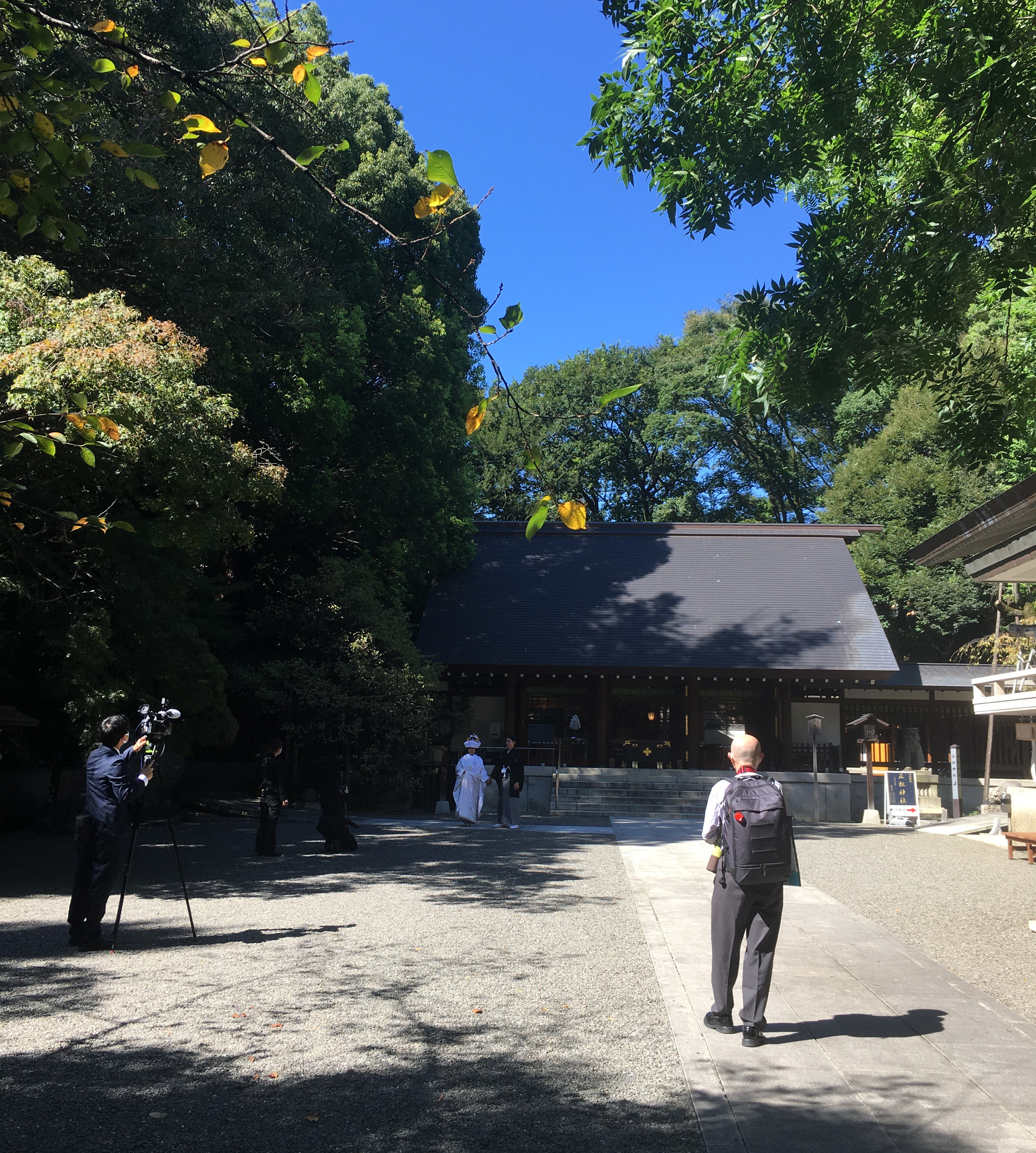
- Nogi Shrine, 2021

- Location within Japan

Religion
- Affiliation: Shinto

Location
- Interactive map of Nogi Shrine (乃木神社, Nogi-jinja)
- Coordinates: 35°40′08″N 139°43′41″E

Nogi Shrine (乃木神社, Nogi-jinja) was established on November 1, 1923 and dedicated to General Nogi Maresuke (63) and his wife Nogi Shizuko (53) who are celebrated as a Shinto kami. Nogi led military forces against China during the Sino-Japanese War of 1894-1895. After their death on September 13, 1912. The Tokyo Mayor, Baron Yoshio Sakatani, took the initiative to organise the Chūō Nogi Kai (Central Nogi Association) to build a shrine to the couple within their residence. It is located in Minato, Tokyo, Japan.

The shrine compound includes an example of Western architecture constructed during the Meiji period. It is famous as the site where General Nogi and his wife chose to kill themselves after the Meiji Emperor's death. The shrine was opened soon after this event but was destroyed during the 1945 air raids on May 25, 1945. The present shrine was built in 1962.

The blades used in the suicides are displayed in the shrines treasure museum three times a year: on New Year's, the Worshippers' Grand Festival at Spring, and the Annual Autumn Festival.

There are several Nogi Shrines in Japan including the following locations:

- Nasushiobara, Tochigi Prefecture
- Fushimi-ku, Kyoto
- Shimonoseki, Yamaguchi Prefecture
- Hannō, Saitama Prefecture

== Address ==
8-11-27 Akasaka, Minato-ku, Tokyo 107-0052

== Access ==
- a one-minute walk from Nogizaka Station on the Tokyo Metro Chiyoda Line (exit 1)

== See also ==
- Togo Shrine
