= Tōgō Shrine =

Shinto shrine in Tokyo, Japan

Tōgō Shrine (東郷神社)
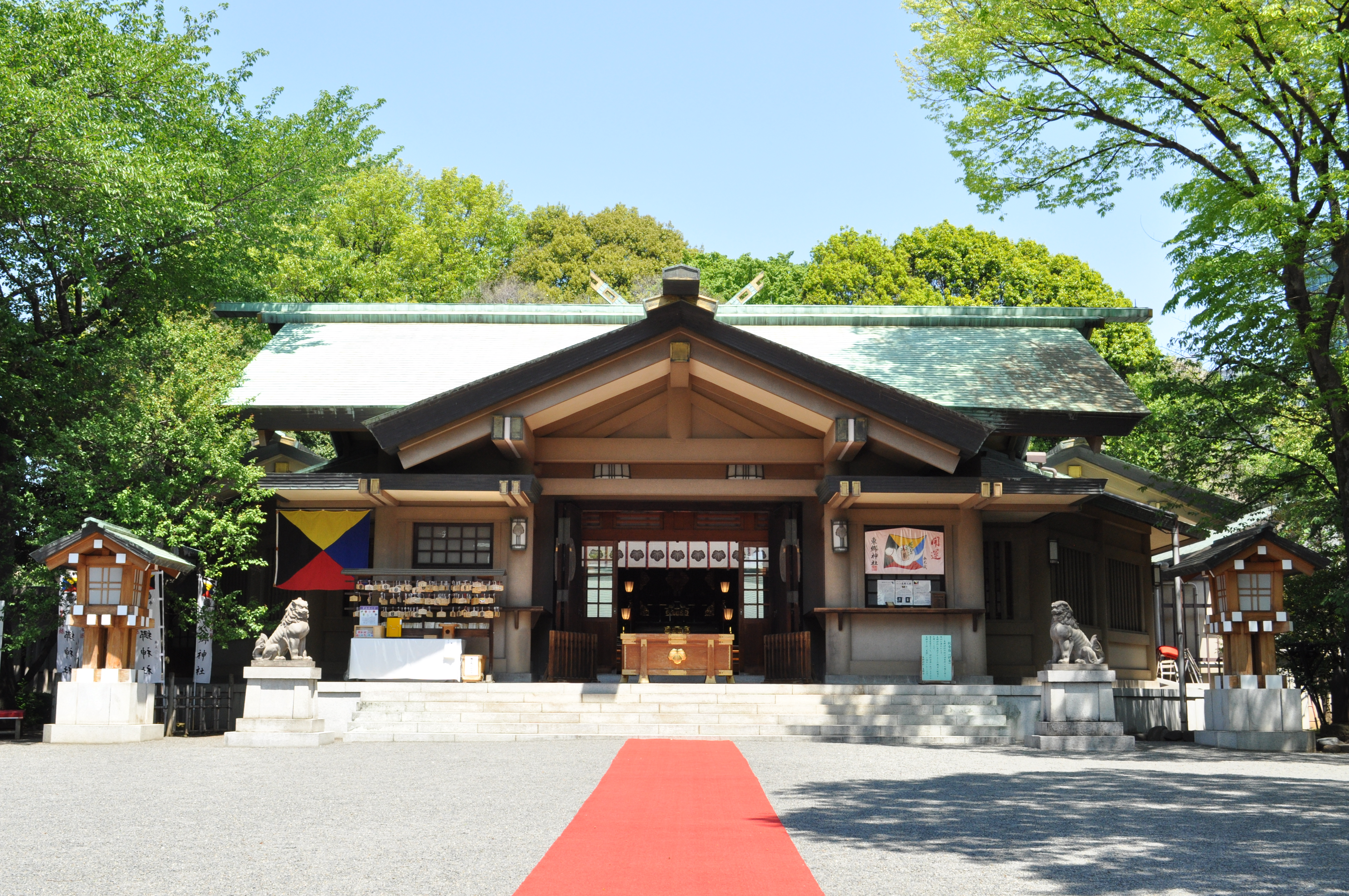
- The Togo Shrine, in Harajuku, Tokyo, Japan.

- Location within Japan

Religion
- Affiliation: Shinto

Location
- Interactive map of Tōgō Shrine (東郷神社)
- Coordinates: 35°40′16″N 139°42′26″E

The Tōgō Shrine (東郷神社 Tōgō-jinja) was established in 1940 and dedicated to Gensui (or 'Marshal-Admiral') the Marquis Tōgō Heihachirō after his death. This shrine was destroyed by the Bombing of Tokyo, but was rebuilt in 1964. It is located in Harajuku, Tokyo, Japan.

There, the Marquis Tōgō Heihachirō is celebrated as a shinto kami.

A small museum and a bookshop dedicated to the Marquis Tōgō are located within the grounds of the shrine.

The shrine is located near the intersection of Takeshita Street and Meiji Avenue and is accessible from Harajuku Station.

The physical remains of the Gensui (or Grand Admiral) himself are interred at Tama Cemetery in Tokyo. According to The Telegraph, the Tōgō Shrine took possession in 2005 of Admiral Tōgō's original battle flag raised at the Battle of Tsushima; the flag had been in Britain since 1911.

== Other shrines ==
As for General Nogi Maresuke who had several shrines throughout Japan named for him (Nogi Shrine), there are other Tōgō shrines, for example there is one at Tsuyazaki, Fukuoka, within earshot of the Battle of Tsushima won by the Marquis Tōgō.
