= Laforet =

Department store in Harajuku, residence and museum in Tokyo

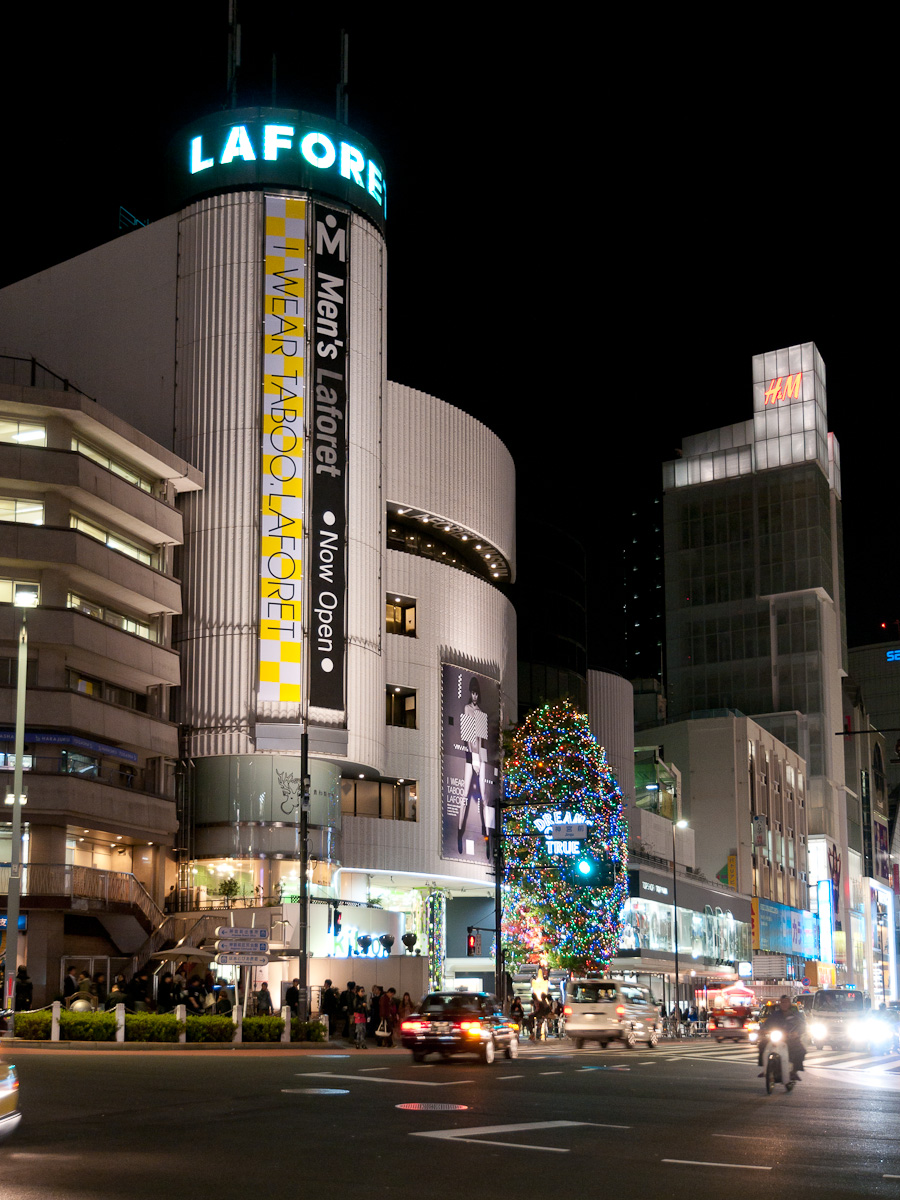
Laforet Harajuku by night, with the Meiji-dori Omotesando intersection in the lower foreground

Laforet Harajuku (ラフォーレ原宿, Rafōre Harajuku) is a department store, residence, and museum complex located in the Harajuku commercial and entertainment district of the Shibuya neighborhood, in Tokyo, Japan.

Constructed over part of the old Tokyo Central Church, a newer church located behind the store, Laforet was opened in 1978. It was built by developer Mori Building, that had developed several sites across Tokyo, as well as (subsequently) the Roppongi Hills Mori Tower, and at the time of opening it was one of the tallest buildings in Tokyo.

The name Mori, in Japanese, is the word for "forest" (森), and the name of the complex was a pun derived from that, it being simply the French words "la forêt" for "the forest".

The complex has six floors and two basements, divided into half levels; with 150 shops, and the Laforet Museum on the top floor.

It has had a long association with youth fashion culture, although this was not originally intended. Although fashion brands such as Hysteric Glamour and Ba-tsu opened their first boutiques there, originally its interior was more staid and conventional for the times. Unfortunately for its developers, this resulted in low sales in the first year of business, causing Ryotu Matsumoko of Ba-stu to be brought in to remodel the interior of the store, changing it to a more youthful and "edgy" design for the time, replacing long and deep stores with wide and shallow stores visible in "panopticon" fashion by shoppers from a central stairwell.

The same was true of its fashion promotion advertising image, originally designed by U.S. firm Antonio Lopez, which was not particularly successful until taken over by Takuya Onuki, who in the mid-1990s switched the advertising campaigns from female models wearing brand clothes to quirky images such as the "Nude" brand of Americans going about their daily business dressed only in underwear, and dogs in denim.

Following the increase in youth fashion culture of the times, Laforet took to partnering with youth fashion magazines and clothing brands to run fashion shows in the building during the 1980s and 1990s. A victim of its own success, with the independent innovators that were originally attracted being acquired by and assimilated into commercial interests, Laforet's fashion shows went into decline in the late 1990s.

A new roster of boutiques began to turn its fortunes around in 2006.
