= Takenoko-zoku =

Type of dance group in Japan

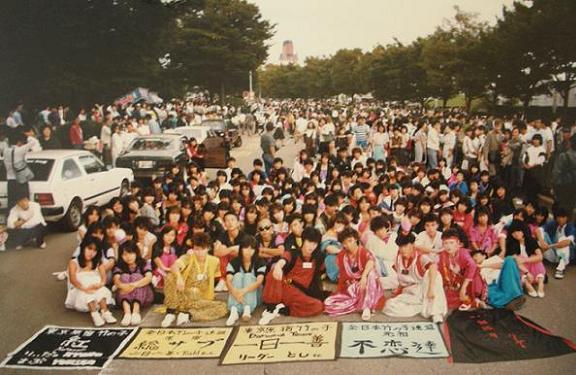
A group of Takenoko-zoku in 1984

Takenoko-zoku (竹の子族, lit. "bamboo shoot tribe") describes a type of dance group active from the mid-1970s to the mid-1980s in Tokyo, especially in Harajuku. The teenagers, mainly girls but often with one boy leading, were colorfully dressed and danced in a distinctive style on the sidewalk to music from stereos. The typical costume worn was referred to as Harlem suits, which were reminiscent of Middle Eastern ethnic outfits with bright colors often with the additions of ribbons, plates, dolls, and pins. This group was formed in response to the conservative culture that dominated Japan at the time. It took advantage of the pedestrian zones that opened on Sundays, which allowed the public to freely roam without yielding to vehicles. To an extent, they were precursors to the gyaru groups that would eventually arise in the 90s.

A performance of a takenoko-zoku group can be seen in Chris Marker's film Sans Soleil.
