= Cat Street, Tokyo =

Street in Japan

Cat Street
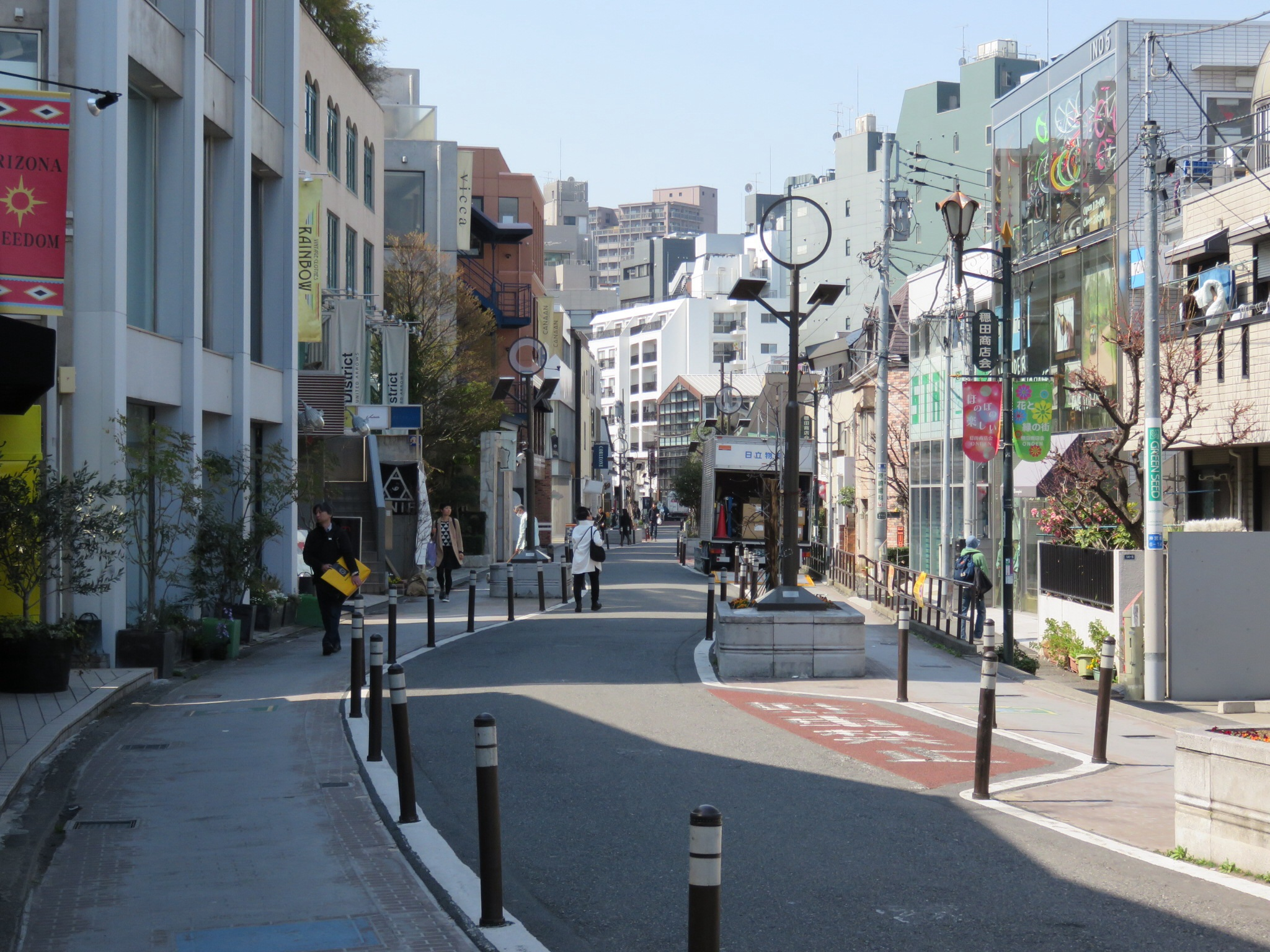
- The street in 2014

- Location within Japan
- Native name: Japanese: キャットストリート
- Type: Street
- Length: 0.5 mi (0.80 km)
- Location: Tokyo
- Coordinates: 35.66618°N 139.70569°E

Other
- Known for: Vibrant street fashion culture

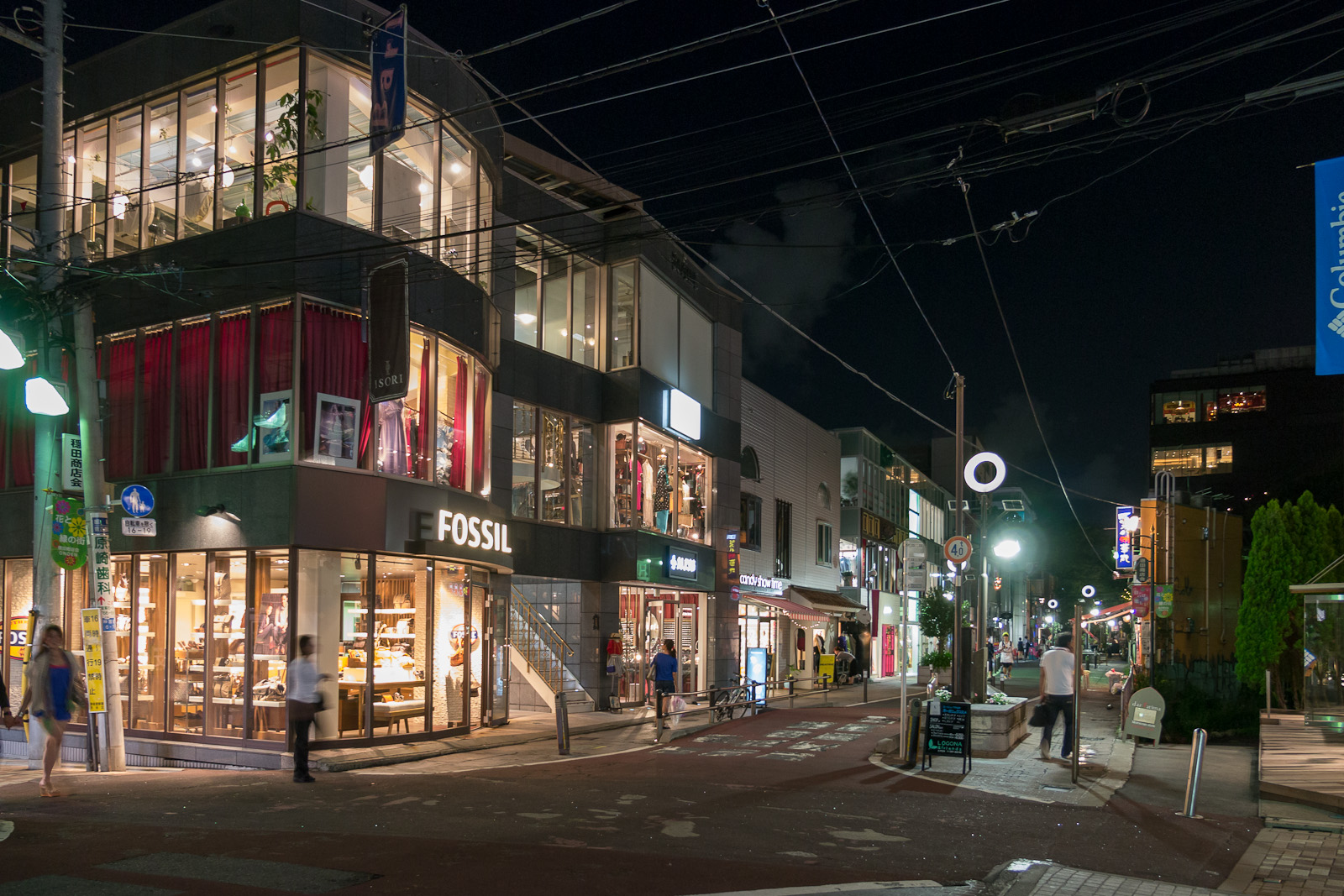
The street at night

Cat Street (キャットストリート, Kyattosutorīto) is an approximately half-mile street in Tokyo, Japan. The street meanders within Harajuku and Shibuya.

According to Time Out Tokyo, "Cat Street is the spiritual home of Tokyo’s vibrant street fashion culture. While the strip has been steadily heading upmarket over the past few years, it is still the main conduit for funkily dressed teens on shopping sprees in Tokyo. Highlights include the Tadao Ando-designed edifice housing the Armani Casa interior brand, and collectable figure store Pook et Koop."

According to Condé Nast Traveler, "Those who want to get to a taste of the more sophisticated side of Tokyo's celebrated urban aesthetic should not miss Cat Street."
