= Ukiyo-e Ōta Memorial Museum of Art =

Art museum in Shibuya, Tokyo, Japan

Coordinates: 35°40′9.9″N 139°42′17.6″E

- 太田記念美術館
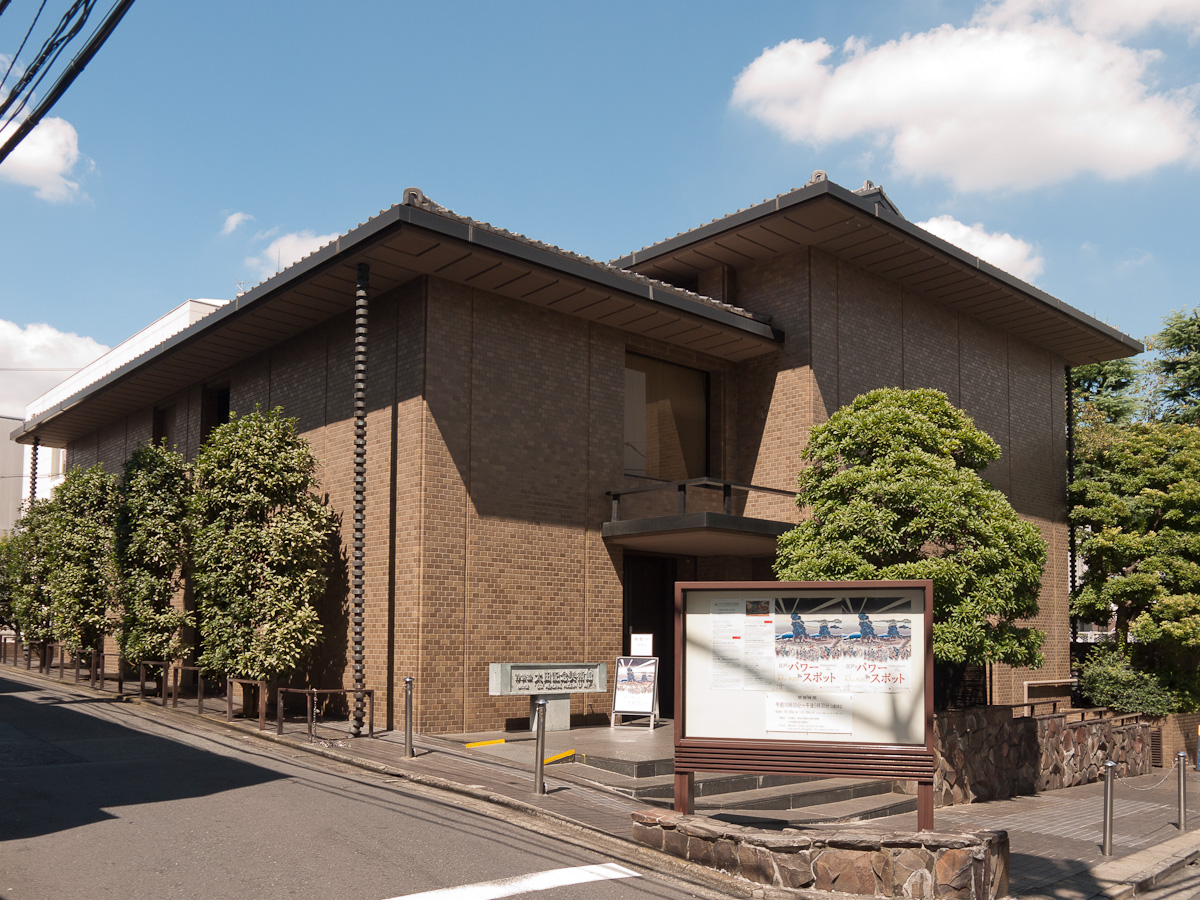
- Type: Art museum
- Website: www.ukiyoe-ota-muse.jp

The Ukiyo-e Ōta Memorial Museum of Art (浮世絵 太田記念美術館, Ukiyo-e Ōta kinen bijutsukan) is a museum in Shibuya, Tokyo, Japan. Opened in January 1980, it presents rotating exhibitions of Ukiyo-e from Ōta Seizo V's collection of over 12,000 pieces.

== Publications ==
The museum has published a number of books about its collection and special exhibitions, including the following:

- Ohara Koson: Paradise On Paper Where Flowers Bloom, Birds Sing (2019), ISBN 9784808711290
- Hokusai (2019)
- Masterpieces of the Ota Memorial Museum of Art (2020)
- Kuniyoshi (2022)
- Hiroshige (2024)
- Fan Pictures by Kuniyoshi: Cats, Kabuki Actors, and Girls (2024)
- Toyohara Kunichika (2025)

== See also ==
- Woodblock printing in Japan
