= Sundai =

Sundai may refer to:

- Sundai Preparatory School
- Sundai Michigan International Academy
- Sundai Ireland International School
- Surugadai
