= Dōjunkai =

Japanese construction company

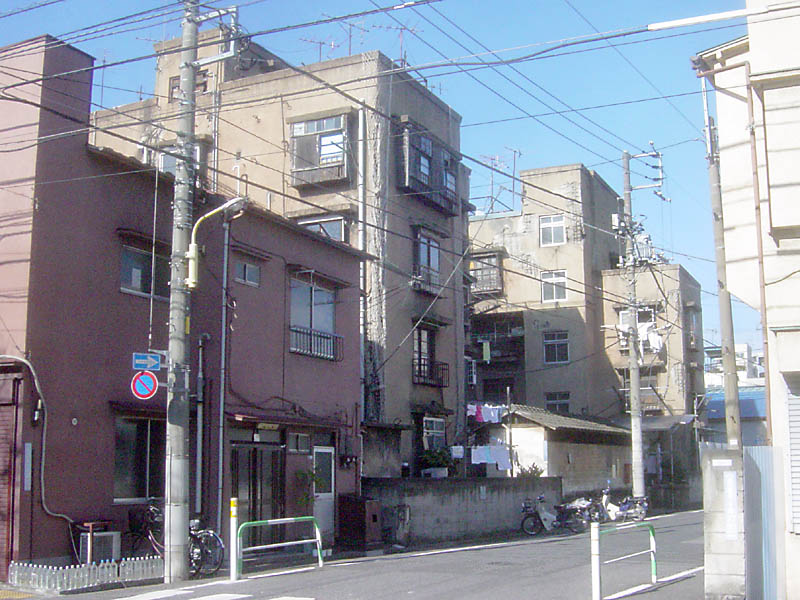
Minowa Apartments

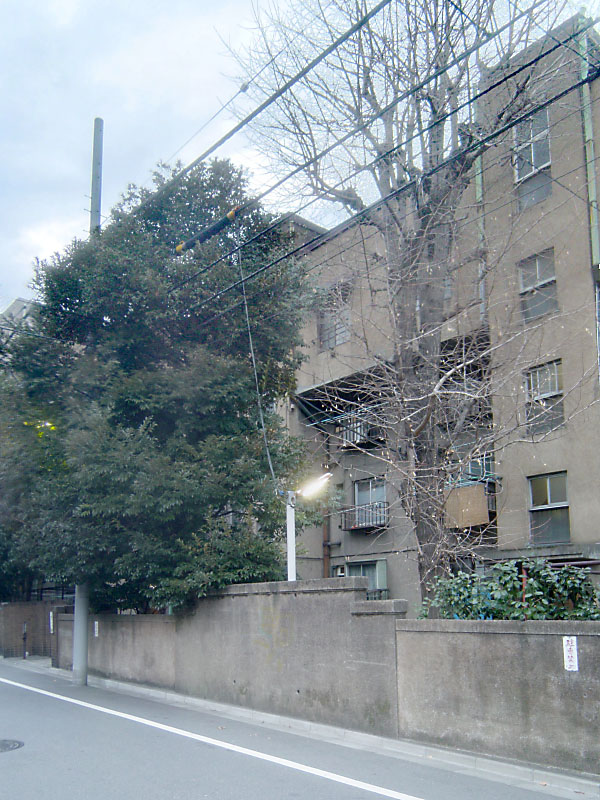
Uenoshita Apartments

Dōjunkai (shinjitai: 同潤会, kyūjitai: 同潤會) was a corporation set up a year after the 1923 Kantō earthquake to provide reinforced concrete (and thus earthquake- and fire-resistant) collective housing in the Tokyo area. Its formal name was Zaidan-hōjin Dōjunkai (財団法人同潤会), i.e. the Dōjunkai corporation. The suffix kai means organization, and dōjun was a term coined to suggest the spread of the nutritious benefit of the water of river and sea. (Note: For a full explanation of the term dōjun, see Seizō Uchida, "Apātomento hausu o wagakuni ni mochikonda Dōjunkai", p. 17, within Hashimoto et al., Kieyuku Dōjunkai Apātomento.) It was overseen by the Home Ministry.

The corporation was in existence from 1924 through 1941; it was involved in construction between 1926 and 1934, primarily 1926–30, building 16 complexes. The last complex, Uenoshita apartment, was finally demolished in 2013.

== History ==
From 1926 to 1930, Dōjunkai created fifteen apartment complexes (apāto or apātomento), two in Yokohama and the rest in Tokyo. Among the latter, the best known is Dōjunkai Aoyama Apartments (built 1926–27), which stood on the avenue of Omotesandō toward its Harajuku Station end. Toward the end of what was by Tokyo standards a long life, the ivy-covered building was increasingly used for ateliers and small independent shops. It was demolished for the 2005 construction by Mori Building of Omotesando Hills, a conventional shopping mall. Dōjunkai built one last complex in Tokyo, Dōjunkai Edogawa apāto, between 1932 and 1934.

Dōjunkai was wound up in 1941.

Remarkably, all the apartment complexes survived wartime bombing.

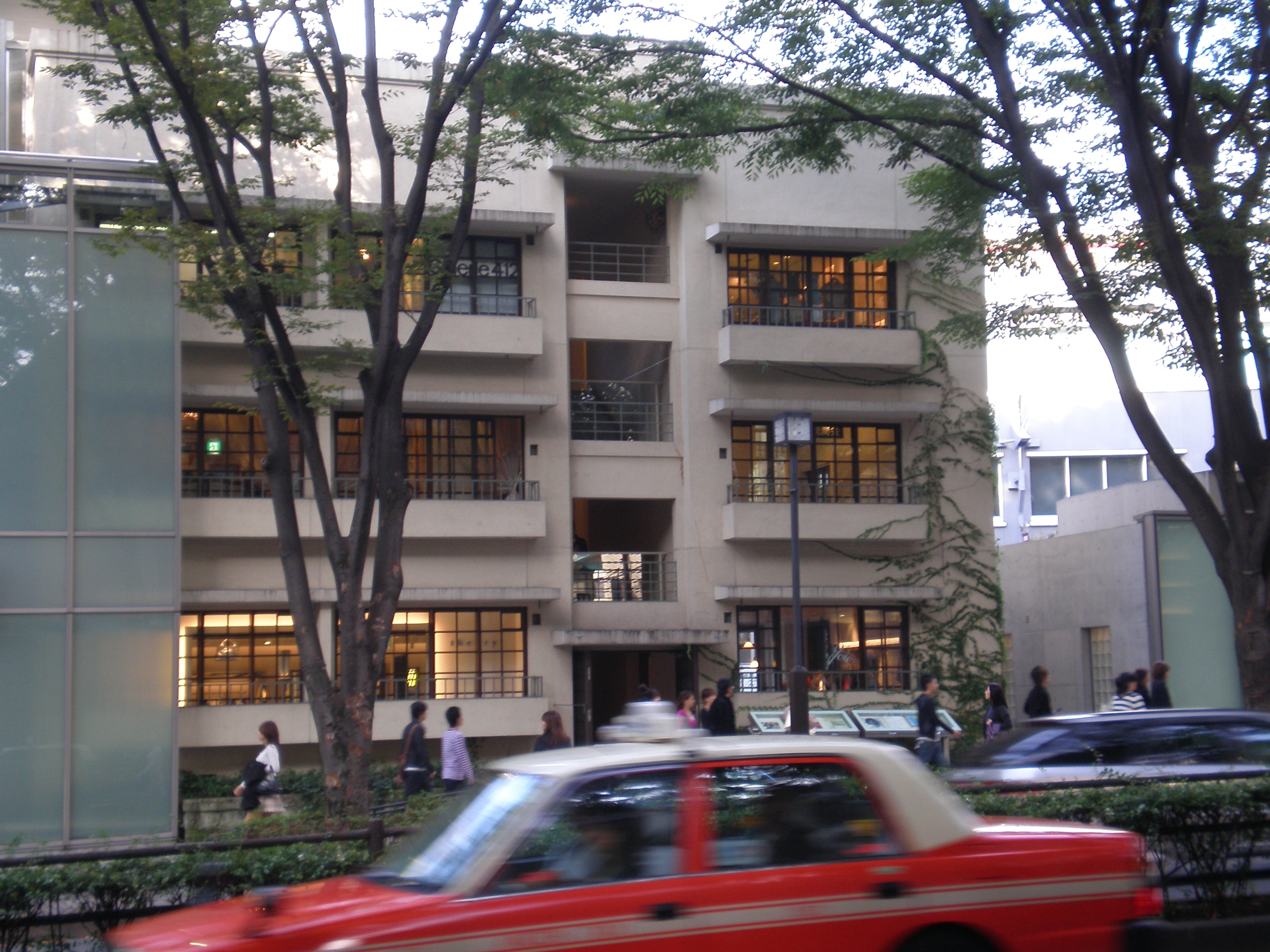
Dojunkan building, Omotesando Hills

After the war, the government sold the land of most of the complexes to real estate companies, notably Mori Building. Thereafter, the combination of desire for greater profits, lack of advance publicity, and lack of government interest in this genre of architecture, in addition to inadequate maintenance and the lack of amenities (notably individual bathing facilities) now taken for granted, have led to the destruction of most of the complexes in the name of "site development".

Currently the only original building can be seen at a conversion project at Dojunkan building, Omotesando Hills. Some shops and galleries are in the building with its facade of a genuine three-stories apartment.

== List of Dōjunkai Apartments ==
Apartments	Japanese name	Completed	Location (present-day "wards")	Demolished (and replaced by)
Nakanogō Apartments	中之郷アパートメント	1926	Sumida, Tokyo	1990 (Setoru Nakanogō)
Aoyama Apartments	青山アパートメント	1926–7	Shibuya, Tokyo	2003 (Omotesando Hills)
Yanagishima Apartments	柳島アパートメント	1926–7	Sumida, Tokyo	1995 (Primēru Yanagishima)
Daikan-yama Apartments	代官山アパートメント	1927	Shibuya, Tokyo	1996 (Daikan-yama Address)
Sumitoshi Apartments (Sarueura-chō Kyōdō Jūtaku)	住利アパートメント (猿江裏町共同住宅)	1927–30	Kōtō, Tokyo	1994 (Twin Tower Sumitoshi)
Kiyosumidōri Apartments (Higashidaiku-chō Apartments)	清砂通アパートメント (東大工町アパートメント)	1927–9	Kōtō, Tokyo	2002
Yamashita-chō Apartments	山下町アパートメント	1927	Naka, Yokohama	1989 (Reiton House)
Hiranuma-chō Apartments	平沼町アパートメント	1927	Nishi, Yokohama	1984 (Monteberte Yokohama)
Minowa Apartments	三ノ輪アパートメント	1928	Arakawa, Tokyo	2009
Mita Apartments	三田アパートメント	1928	Minato, Tokyo	1988 (Shanpōru Mita)
Uguisudani Apartments	鶯谷アパートメント	1929	Arakawa, Tokyo	1999 (Rīdensu Tower)
Uenoshita Apartments	上野下アパートメント	1929	Taitō, Tokyo	2013
Toranomon Apartments	虎ノ門アパートメント	1929	Chiyoda, Tokyo	2000 (Daidō Seimei Kasumigaseki Biru)
Ōtsuka Joshi Apartments	大塚女子アパートメント	1930	Bunkyō, Tokyo	2003
Sumitoshi Apartments (Higashi-chō Apartments)	住利アパートメント (東町アパートメント)	1930	Kōtō, Tokyo	1994 (Twin Tower Sumitoshi)
Edogawa Apartments	江戸川アパートメント	1934	Shinjuku, Tokyo	2003

== See also ==
- Bunka Apartments
