= I'MAX =

Japanese company

I'MAX Corp
- Industry: Video games
- Defunct: 1998

I'MAX Corp (Note: Japanese: 株式会社アイマックス, Hepburn: Kabushiki Gaisha Aimakkusu) was a Japanese company that developed and published video games in the 1990s.

It also ran its own video game development school, I'Max Academy. One of its members won the grand prize for up-and-coming game developers at the 1998 Tokyo Game Show.

In Japan, it published games such as the PlayStation and Sega Saturn version of Worms.

Its series of puzzle and board video games were popular in Japan. Its PlayStation title I'MAX Shogi II received a re-release for the Japanese PlayStation Store. As of July 2024, many of its classic titles are available on the cloud gaming service Project EGG.

Some of the people who worked on I'MAX games have gone on to enjoy successful careers in the gaming industry, such as Sohei Niikawa, who worked on titles such as Dual Orb, and Hiroyuki Kotani, whose first game was Dual Orb II.

== Micom BASIC column ==
During I'MAX's lifetime, major Japanese video game companies had specialists who wrote articles for Micom BASIC to announce new developments. Like Konami’s "Konami News Station" and Capcom’s "Capcom World," I'MAX's also had its own column in the magazine.

The column from April 1995 announced a sequel to Super Keiba and also lamented the Great Hanshin earthquake, informing that I'MAX had workers from the area.

== Video game library ==
- Ball Bullet Gun
- Bakuretsu Hunter
- Bōken Danshaku Don: The Lost Sunheart
- Cyber Doll
- Dossun! Ganseki Battle
- Dual Orb
- Dual Orb II
- Famicom Igo Nyuumon
- Famicom Shogi: Ryū-Ō-Sen
- Innsmouth no Yakata
- Irem Arcade Classics
- Kandume Monsters
- Death Brade
- Navy Blue
- Nikkan Berutomo Club
- Pachi-Slot World Cup '94
- Super Keiba series
- Super Keirin
- Super Kōkō Yakyū
- Super Shogi series
- Super Mahjong series
- Super!! Pachinko
- Super Hanafuda series
- Tsume Shogi Mondai Teikyou: Shogi Sekai
- Worms (PlayStation and Sega Saturn versions)
