= Century Tower (Tokyo) =

Coordinates: 35°42′08″N 139°45′35″E

- センチュリータワー
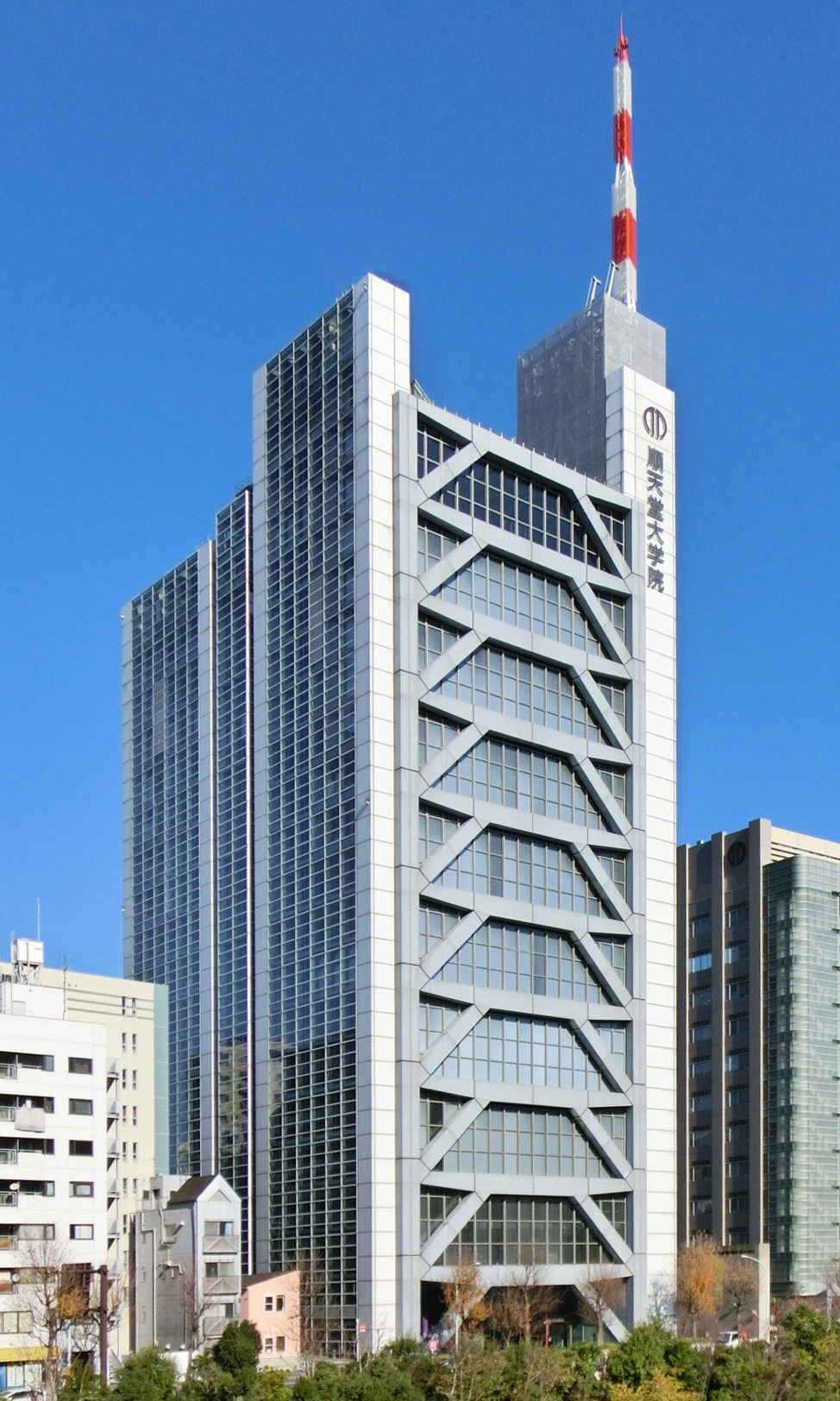
- Century Tower in 2012

General information
- Architectural style: structural expressionism
- Location: 2-2-9, Hongo, Bunkyo, Tokyo, Japan
- Groundbreaking: December 1988
- Completed: May 1991
- Owner: Juntendo University

Height
- Height: 91.1m

Design and construction
- Architect: Norman Foster
- Main contractor: Obayashi Corporation

The Century Tower is a 21-story building located in Hongo, Bunkyo, Tokyo. The building overlooks the River Kanda, with Ochanomizu on the opposite side.

== History ==
The site where the Century Tower stands was previously occupied by the Bunka Apartments, the first Western-style block of flats ever built in Japan.

The tower was commissioned by Kazuo Akao, the son of publishing tycoon Yoshio Akao, as the headquarters of the Obunsha publishing house. It cost Obunsha 1.8 billion yen to commission British architect Norman Foster to design it and the construction cost the company 23 billion yen. The structure has two main towers with a 72-metre-high atrium between them. This design nearly failed to gain authorisation from the Ministry of Health and Welfare due to Japan's stricter fire safety regulations. However, Obayashi Corporation brought Foster's plan to life by pressurising the air throughout the atrium. The building was completed in May 1991.

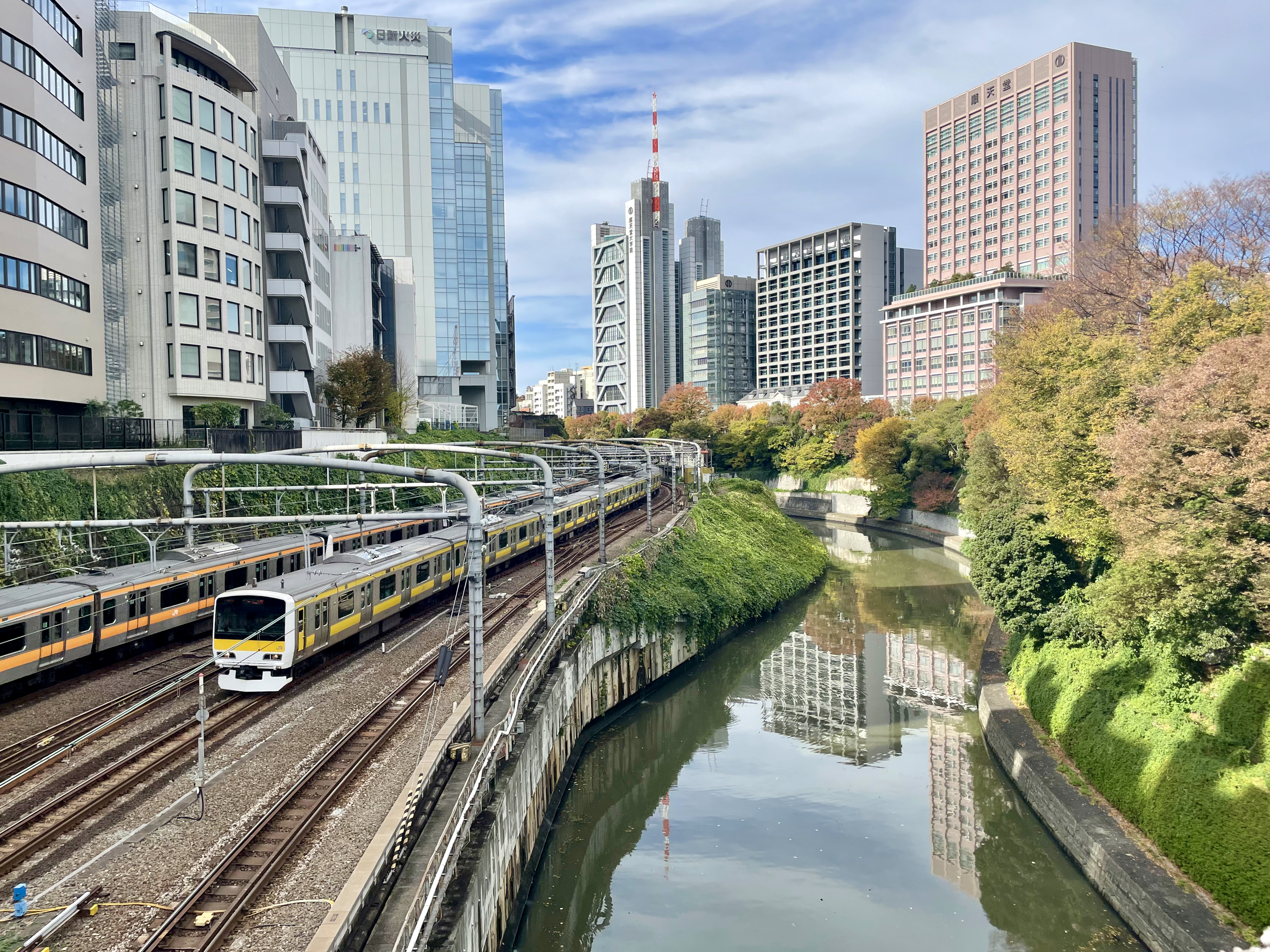
The building in 2022

During the Lost Decades, the original owner faced financial difficulties and sold the building. In 2007, it was purchased by its current owner, Juntendo University.
