= Dual Orb II =

1994 video game

- Developer: Prism Kikaku
- Publisher: I'MAX
- Composers: Nobuyuki Hara; Yu Yoshida
- Platform: Super Famicom
- Release: 1994
- Genre: Role-playing
- Mode: Single-player

Dual Orb II (Note: Japanese: デュアルオーブ2, Hepburn: Duaruōbu Tsu) is a role-playing video game released in 1994 for the Super Famicom by I'MAX. It is the sequel of Dual Orb: Seireiju Densetsu.

It was the first game Hiroyuki Kotani, known for the Patapon series, was involved in.

== Reception and legacy ==
Game Fēngjǐngxiàn and SNES Central complimented the graphics in the game. Game Rant and FanByte recommended the game in articles about Japan-exclusive releases.

Months after its release, the game was sold in American stores as an import title. Fan translations have been created for it in English and Polish.

It was added to the catalog of Project EGG, a licensed emulation platform, in December 2011.
