= Bunka Apartments =

Residential building in Tokyo (1925–1986)

Coordinates: 35°42′08″N 139°45′35″E

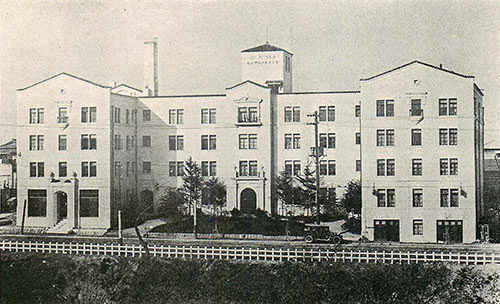
The Bunka Apartments in 1926

The Bunka Apartments (文化アパートメント, Bunka apātomento; lit. 'Culture Apartments') was a residential building located on the bank of the Kanda River at Ochanomizu in Bunkyō, Tokyo. It was commissioned by Morimoto Kōkichi as part of a drive to introduce western living to Japan. Designed by American architect William Merrell Vories and completed in 1925, the four-storey, Spanish Mission-style building was the first western block of flats to be constructed in the country.

The Bunka Apartments offered well-appointed accommodation with imported fittings, and facilities including a lounge, café, dining room, and shops. The building was requisitioned by the US military following Japan's defeat in the Second World War, and was later acquired by the Obunsha publishing company for use as a student dormitory. It was razed in 1986 to make way for the Century Tower.

== History ==
=== Planning and construction ===
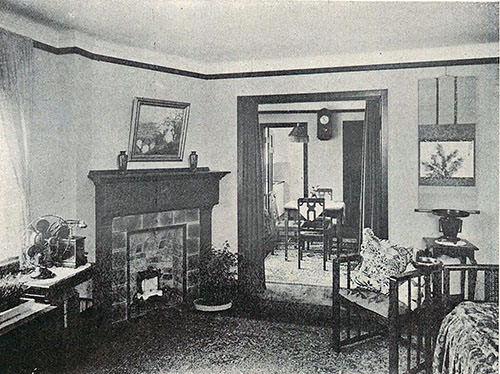
Flat interior

The construction of the Bunka Apartments was planned by the Society for the Diffusion of Culture (文化普及會, Bunka fukyū kai), an organisation founded by Morimoto Kōkichi to raise the Japanese standard of living by promoting westernisation. The project, which was announced in February 1923, encountered a number of difficulties in the planning and land acquisition stages. While Morimoto had secured public financing for the building, the Great Kanto Earthquake in September 1923 interrupted both the release of these funds and work on the project. Government cutbacks due to the fiscal burden imposed by the earthquake resulted in a reduction in funding, but the project continued. The Home Ministry even supplied imported American lumber to support construction.

The destruction wrought by the earthquake made land acquisition easier, and ultimately a site in the well-connected Ochanomizu area was secured. The building was designed by American architect William Merrell Vories in the Spanish Mission style, and constructed by the Obayashi Corporation. Completed on 15 November 1925, it was the first western-style block of flats ever built in Japan. The four-storey reinforced concrete structure was designed to be both earthquake and fire resistant, and offered a hotel-like lifestyle. Flats were fully furnished in the western style, and equipped with modern conveniences like telephones and gas cookers. Residents could make use of a lounge, café, dining room, and shops. Cleaning and laundry services were provided by domestic staff.

=== Impact and criticism ===
Morimoto Kōkichi, who earned his doctorate at Johns Hopkins University, aspired to introduce the American middle-class lifestyle to his home country. Addressing a meeting of the Phi Beta Kappa Association at the Bunka Apartments in 1926, he explained that his organisation planned the building as part of an initiative to improve housing conditions in Japan, rather than purely for financial gain. He said he hoped that the Bunka Apartments could become a place of cross-cultural understanding, as it was home to both Japanese and foreign residents.

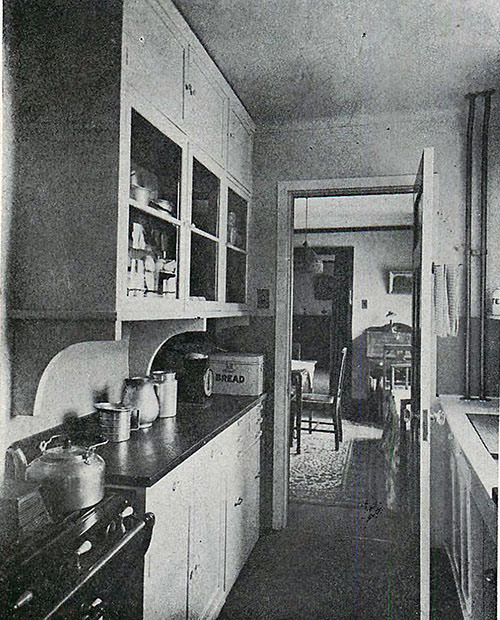
Kitchen

In accordance with Morimoto's principles, the building's living spaces were designed to replicate those of the American middle class, and featured appliances imported from the United States, such as electric washing machines and clothes dryers. In practice, however, the luxurious Bunka Apartments were too expensive for the average Tokyoite. Rent was, on average, more than double that of a flat in a wooden dwelling, and was equivalent to a month's wages for the average salaryman. At the building's opening, one third of its 43 flats were occupied by non-Japanese. The project was later criticised for having produced a publicly-financed residence for the well-off, and for being "estranged from reality".

The Bunka Apartments' expensive Americocentric design can be contrasted with designs adopted by the Dōjunkai, a government-backed corporation that constructed 16 blocks of flats from 1926 to 1934. Built to accommodate people affected by the Great Kanto Earthquake, these reinforced concrete structures incorporated Japanese-style tatami spaces and simpler facilities, and were more reasonably priced. While the Bunka Apartments served as one example of an earthquake- and fire-resistant alternative to traditional Japanese housing, the high cost of building in this style prevented its wider adoption prior to the end of the Second World War. The Dōjunkai's buildings, on the other hand, became a model for middle-class multifamily housing in Japan.

=== Repurposing and demolition ===
Amid wartime restrictions on private enterprise, the Society for the Diffusion of Culture sold the Bunka Apartments to the Japan Publishing Culture Association (日本出版文化協会, Nihon shuppan bunka kyōkai) in March 1943. That organisation, which was created to control the Japanese publishing industry, used the building as its national headquarters. Following Japan's defeat in the Second World War, it was requisitioned by the US military to billet officers.

After a period of disuse, the building was sold to the Obunsha publishing company. Obunsha repurposed it to house students from provincial Japan visiting Tokyo for exams or school outings. This facility, called the Nihon Gakusei Kaikan (日本学生会館; lit. 'Japan Student Hall'), opened in 1959.

The ageing building was razed in 1986 and replaced by the Century Tower.

== Influence ==
Mystery writer Edogawa Ranpo modelled his character Akechi Kogoro's abode-cum-office, the "Kaika Apartments" (開化アパート, Kaika apāto), on the building.
