= Patapon 2 =

2008 video game

- European box art
- Developers: Pyramid; Japan Studio (Note: Replay developed by sAs)
- Publisher: Sony Computer Entertainment (Note: Replay published by Bandai Namco Entertainment)
- Series: Patapon
- Platforms: PlayStation Portable; PlayStation 4; 1+2 Replay: Nintendo Switch; PlayStation 5; Windows
- Release: PlayStation Portable: JP: November 27, 2008; EU: March 6, 2009; AU: March 13, 2009; NA: May 5, 2009; PlayStation 4: WW: January 30, 2020; 1+2 Replay; Nintendo Switch, PlayStation 5, Windows: WW: July 11, 2025
- Genres: Rhythm, god game
- Modes: Single-player, multiplayer

Patapon 2 (Note: Japanese: パタポン2 ドンチャカ♪, Hepburn: Patapon Tsū Don Chaka) is a 2008 rhythm video game developed by Pyramid and Japan Studio and published by Sony Computer Entertainment for the PlayStation Portable. It is a direct sequel to Patapon, and like its predecessor, uses the same unique genre that combines rhythm and strategy. The game was released in Japan in November 2008, in PAL regions in March 2009, in North America in May 2009, and a port for the PlayStation 4 was released on January 30, 2020. A remaster of the game is included in the compilation Patapon 1+2 Replay, released on July 11, 2025, for Nintendo Switch, PlayStation 5 and Windows.

After the Patapon and Zigoton tribe finish the construction of their ship, they set sail to continue their journey to Earthend to gaze upon "IT". After some time at sea, their ship is struck down by a sea monster and both Patapons and Zigotons drift ashore on an unknown island where they encounter a new enemy tribe known as the Karmen and a lone Patapon known as "Hero". The player takes the role of an invisible deity known as The Mighty Patapon and commands the Patapon Tribe to march, attack, defend, and retreat. The game introduces a new way to evolve the Patapon army, and new units to unlock including a singular Hero Patapon that can be used for four-player ad hoc multiplayer mode.

A sequel titled Patapon 3 was released on April 12, 2011, in North America, April 15, 2011, in Europe, and on April 28, 2011, in Japan.

== Gameplay ==
The core gameplay of Patapon 2 is almost identical to its predecessor. It is a video game that the player controls in a manner similar to rhythm games. The player is directly controlled by a tribe of Patapon warriors; to command the warriors, the player inputs specific sequences using the face buttons on the PSP, each representing a "talking drum", in time to a drum rhythm. These sequences order the tribe to move forward on the linear battlefield, attack, defend, and other actions. If the player inputs an unknown sequence or enters them off the main rhythm, the tribe will become confused and stop whatever they are doing. However, repeatedly entering a proper sequence in sync with the rhythm will lead the tribe into a "Fever" increasing their attack and defensive bonuses. The tribe will stop doing anything after performing the last entered command if the player does not enter any more commands. For example, some commands are square, square, square, circle (Pata, Pata, Pata, Pon.), which has them march forward and circle, circle, square, circle (Pon, Pon, Pata, Pon.), which makes them attack.

The game is divided into several missions. Prior to each mission, the player can recruit new troops and assemble formations, equip troops with weapons and armor gained from the spoils of war, or crafted from certain minigames. The player can return to an earlier mission to acquire additional resources and equipment to build up their troops before a larger battle.

=== Units ===
Patapon 2 introduces four types of units: The bird-riding and Harpoon-wielding Toripons, the robot-armed Robopons, the Wand-wielding Mahopons, and the singular Heropon. Patapon classes can now be unlocked through the evolutionary tree. Also, Rarepon can be made without sacrificing Patapon to make space for newer ones. To maintain an incentive for collecting items, there is an abundant amount of classes of Patapon to rely upon, some Patapon such as the "Pyokoran" Rarepon being nimble in battle as well being immune to freezing but are vulnerable to fire damage. Another change is that a Patapon can level up by using more material with effects amplifying at every 5 levels to a maximum of 10.

The Heropon is a singular hero unit that can adopt any unlocked class of their choice with a powerful special attack to deliver to unsuspecting foes. Players can change their masks for different stats, like elemental resistance or attack speed. They also can be revived but takes longer to revive with each death. In addition, if Hatapon is alone while the Heropon is reviving, the mission ends. Each "Hero" persona also has a special move that can only be activated in Fever mode and must have a perfect beat. This special ability shows a spirit above him and allows him to have a special damage effect on opponents like The Iron Fist (Yaripon), Broken Arrow (Yumipon).

=== Multiplayer ===
Patapon designer Hiroyuki Kotani has revealed that the multiplayer mode stems from the single-player mode, the former of which will involve giant eggs. These eggs contain Masks for the Hero Patapon to wear or new CPU Kumopons. To hatch the eggs, four players must defend the egg on an enemy-laden multiplayer battleground, while moving it to a special egg-hatching altar. At this altar, all players must perform a hatching ceremony, which involves playing their rhythms in synchronization to crack the egg.

== Plot ==
The story continues from the previous game. The ship the Patapons and Zigotons have constructed has been finally completed and they have set sail for new lands. On their way there, they are attacked by a Kraken who easily defeats them and sends the Patapons into the ocean to be washed ashore in a strange new land (which is actually and originally their homeland, the Patapolis) where they come up against another tribe called the Karmen. Now it is a battle to defeat the Karmen and find out who is their true enemy. Early in the game, the Patapons discover the mysterious "Hero", who wears a mask that boosts his abilities. He has lost his memory, and his true identity is forgotten, hidden, and unknown. Later, the Patapons fight against the Akumapons, and the "Dark One" (who is actually Makoton, the Zigoton that was killed in the first game with Baban, and now was reincarnated), who gave his soul to the demons for power. Gong the Hawkeye and his fellow Zigotons appear once more, to assist the Patapons against the Karmen.

During the course of a game, the player learns of a legend, that the world was broken and the Patapons ruined because a Wakapon broke the "World Egg". At the second to last stage, the player finds out that the Hero was actually the Wakapon who broke the egg, and that the Karmen tribe was the Patapon's ancestral enemy, knowing them as the ones who overtook the Patapon Ancients. The Patapon Princess was trapped inside an egg by Ormen Karmen, the leader of the Karmens, who plans to make the Princess his queen.

After defeating the demon Dettankarmen that the Karmens summoned, the Patapons journey to the end of a bridge, only to find and break an egg. Dazzled by the bright light that emerges from the egg, the Patapons assume they have found "IT" at Earthend, which they have been searching since the first game. However, the Patapon Princess emerges from the egg, compliments them on their job well done, and tells the Hero that he has a new task - to restore the world and find the true Earthend.

At the end of the game, the Patapons are seen working with the Karmen and Zigotons to fix the bridge that will lead them to the other side of the land.

== Characters ==
Rob Smith writes that new "characters such as the bird-riding Toripon, the Robopon with huge fists, and the magic-using Mahopon provide fresh attack types and original personalities for your almighty ruler to manage." In an interview attached to the same article, Hiroyuki Kotani adds that all "the new characters ended up... attractive from a fundamental gameplay standpoint, so I picked the ones I liked the most." When asked, "From all the characters...is any one of them your personal favorite?" Kotani answered, "I love Gong, the leader of the Zigotons. In fact, I love him so much you can probably expect to see him in Patapon 2."

== Development and release ==
Patapon 2 was developed by Pyramid and produced by Japan Studio. Game designer Hiroyuki Kotani began the development of Patapon 2 during the localization development of its predecessor. During this time, he was approached by producer Junichi Yoshizawa to create a multiplayer version of Patapon. Initially Kotani disapproved multiplayer but would regret not adding it in the original version after seeing an online bulletin criticizing the lack of multiplayer. In addition to multiplayer, Kotani received requests for Patapon to have more customization and longer gameplay time. Kotani also noted the complaints of its predecessor being too difficult and aimed at making the sequel easier but also have enough features so that it isn't considered Patapon 1.5. The bird-riding Toripons introduced in Patapon 2 were initially planned for its predecessor, Patapon. Kemmei Adachi returns as the composer for the game and would write down Kotani's instructions after they both finished surfing together. The voices for Patapon and the enemies were voiced by a child under the alias "Blico". Adachi would create a demo of the song and show it to Blico to sing it.

A demo was shown in GDC 2009 with keychain and plush prototype merchandise. The Plush was released officially by Medicom Toy in December 2008. Patapon 2 was released on November 27, 2008, alongside a limited edition PSP 3000 bundle, titled Patapon 2 Don Chaka Winter Gift Pack. (Note: パタポン2 ドンチャカ ♪ Winterギフトパック)

It was later released in North America on May 9, 2009, in digital format only via PlayStation Store as a test case to determine consumer preferences. A flash minigame titled, Patapon 2: Art of War was developed by Kerb to promote Patapon 2. It was hosted on SPIL Games from March 9 to March 16, 2009. The game was later ported on PlayStation 4 on January 30, 2020, under the title Patapon 2 Remastered.

A second remaster, bundled with its prequel as Patapon 1+2 Replay, was released for the Nintendo Switch, PlayStation 5 and Windows on July 11, 2025, by Bandai Namco Entertainment. Developed by sAs, developer of the Theatrhythm series, it further enhances on gameplay and graphics from the original, as well as introducing new quality of life features and difficulty options; multiplayer is exclusive to the Nintendo Switch version. On December 22, 2025 the game received a free update that introduced a new boss rush game mode.

== Reception ==
Reception

Aggregate score
Aggregator	Score
Metacritic	PSP: 81/100; PS4: 75/100

Review scores
Publication	Score
Edge	5/10
Famitsu	8, 8, 8, 9/10
Game Informer	7/10
GamePro	4.5/5
GameRevolution	B
GameSpot	8/10
IGN	9.5/10
PlayStation Official Magazine – Australia	9/10
PlayStation Official Magazine – UK	8/10
Pocket Gamer	3.5/5
PSM3	7.2/10

By the first week of release, Patapon 2 was ranked #1 top-selling PSP game of North America. Famitsu inducted the game onto their Gold Hall of Fame. IGN awarded the game for "Best Action Game" and for "PSP Game of the Year".

Multiple reviewers questioned whether Patapon 2 fit the definition of a "sequel". PlayStation Official Magazine – Australia initially compared it to downloadable content, reporting that the game continues directly where its predecessor ended and doesn't make any changes to the core gameplay. However, concluded the review describing it as a true sequel, and having little to criticize. PlayStation Official Magazine – UK also noted that the game was similar to its predecessor but felt it was ludicrous to criticize the game for lack of originality. IGN reported that the game was very similar to its predecessor, particularly in the beginning and ending but continued to state that the game was more than just Patapon 1.5. GamePro's Heather Bartron called the game a "must-have title for PSP owners," praising it as an improved sequel to the already enjoyable and addictive Patapon. Bartron wrote that both titles have great visual style though Patapon 2 has limited multiplayer modes and "needs more songs." Hyper's Tracey Lien commends the game for being "exactly the same as the first Patapon, which is good because the original was really rad".

During the 13th Annual Interactive Achievement Awards, the Academy of Interactive Arts & Sciences nominated Patapon 2 for "Outstanding Achievement in Portable Game Design".
