= Mutant Fighter (arcade game) =

1991 fighting game

- Developer: Data East
- Publishers: Data East; I'MAX (SNES)
- Platforms: Arcade, FM Towns, Sharp X68000, SNES
- Release: Arcade: JP: July 1991; NA: 1992; Super Famicom: JP: July 16, 1993
- Genre: Fighting game
- Modes: Single-player, multiplayer

Mutant Fighter, originally titled in Japan as (デスブレイド, Death Brade), is a 1991 fighting game published and developed in-house by Data East for arcades. It was later ported to the FM Towns, Sharp X68000, and Super Nintendo Entertainment System. The SNES version was developed and published by I'Max. It is a sequel to Data East's 1989 arcade title Hippodrome.

== Gameplay ==
Arcade version screenshot

Mutant Fighter's roster includes eight playable characters - three human characters and five monsters; the human characters are the Fighter, Amazoness, and Hercules. The monster playable characters are a Werewolf, Golem, Minotaur, Dragon, and the Beast. The SNES version instead has five playable characters, omitting the Werewolf, Golem and Dragon from the roster. Non-playable characters faced as opponents include the Hydra, the Doppleganger, the demon Pazuzu, and the Archmage. Different characters have different Power, Speed, and Defense stats. Mutant Fighter features one-player mode versus AI or a two-player cooperative mode, where the players compete against two AI opponents simultaneously. The player may choose which opponents they face in the first three matches, sans the unplayable characters; after these three matches the opponents are chosen by the computer. When successfully hitting their opponent, characters accumulate Energy, which can be used for special attacks. Each character has unique special moves. In addendum to each character's unique move, there are 19 different attacks which can be achieved through different combos. The arcade version's title screen demo mode serves as a tutorial for the player to learn these moves.

== Plot ==
The king is dead, and a combat tournament is being held to determine a new ruler. The player faces twelve opponents sequentially in one-on-one combat, and upon defeating them all, is crowned ruler of the kingdom.

== Development ==
Mutant Fighter underwent location testing in the UK in 1991, although under an alternate title: Heroes.

== Reception ==
Reception

Review scores
Publication	Score
Sinclair User	87/100 (Arcade)
Video Games	22% (SNES)

In Japan, Game Machine listed Mutant Fighter on their August 15, 1991 issue as being the second most-successful table arcade unit of the month. RePlay also reported the game to be the eighteen most-popular arcade game at the time.

The One reviewed the arcade version of Mutant Fighter in 1991 as it was undergoing location testing under the title Heroes, stating that "Wonderful graphics, animation and sound make Heroes an outstanding game" and furthermore praises its gameplay and number of different attacks.

Sinclair User reviewed the arcade version as it was also undergoing location testing, giving it 87 out of 100 and calling it "very classy", praising the game's "amazing" sound effects, and stating that "[Heroes has] great animation and action, particularly if you can find the combination that produces your 'special attack', which will cause serious damage to your opponent."

German gaming magazine Video Games reviewed the Japanese SNES version of Mutant Fighters under the name Death Brade, giving it an overall score of 22%. Video Games begins their review by criticising the game's gameplay, sound, and graphics, stating "What got into I'Max, so that they would let loose this pathetic effort unto humanity? The graphics are only just 8-bit capable and the fighters are teeming with clumsiness and Legoland-style animation cycles. When you land a hit [on your opponent], it sounds like a baby slurping porridge. Moreover: the likelihood of the Großglockner collapsing is greater than discovering a special move in Death Brade." In regards to Death Brade's combat, they expressed that "no matter what you try, your fighter will be guaranteed to do the thing that is the most useless". Video Games also criticized the number of stages available, and called the names of the characters "irrelevant".
