= Dual Orb: Seireiju Densetsu =

1993 video game

Dual Orb: Seireiju Densetsu (Note: Japanese: デュアルオーブ 聖霊珠伝説, Hepburn: Duaruōbu Seireiju Densetsu) is a role-playing video game developed by Prism Kikaku and released in 1993 for the Super Famicom by I'MAX. It was followed by Dual Orb II.

== Development ==
Sohei Niikawa, then-future CEO of Nippon Ichi Software, was involved in its development. The development of the game was documented in the Micom BASIC Magazine. The Super Famicom gifted readers with Dual Orb telephone cards during its development.

== Reception ==
Famimaga readers collectively gave the title 18.86 points (out of 30 points). Game Rant considered the Dual Orb series "worth remembering".
