= Patapon 3 =

2011 video game

- European box art
- Developers: Pyramid; Japan Studio
- Publisher: Sony Computer Entertainment
- Series: Patapon
- Platform: PlayStation Portable
- Release: NA: April 12, 2011; EU: April 15, 2011; JP: April 28, 2011
- Genres: Rhythm, god game
- Modes: Single-player, multiplayer

Patapon 3 (Japanese: パタポン3, Hepburn: Patapon Surī) is a 2011 rhythm video game developed by Pyramid and Japan Studio and published by Sony Computer Entertainment for the PlayStation Portable. It is the final installment in the Patapon series and a sequel to Patapon 2 (2008). Gameplay is similar to previous titles, but has a greater focus on multiplayer than Patapon 2. Like its predecessors, Patapon 3 is presented in a cartoonish, silhouetted two-dimensional environment designed by French artist Rolito, now with more detailed backgrounds.

== Plot ==
Patapon 3 begins where the previous game ended. The Patapons finish the Rainbow Bridge and have crossed the river to a new land, where they find a large mysterious box. Despite Meden's warnings, the Patapons opened the box, then Seven Archfiends came out and petrified everyone, except the flag carrier, Hatapon. A new undead tribe, the Bonedeth Brigade, are determined to defeat the Patapons. Even the Akumapons from the previous game are encountered later in the game. However, hope is far from lost, for inside the box was not just the Seven Archfiends, but also Silver Hoshipon, which found the Almighty and offered to help restore some of the Patapons back to life. The first Patapon Silver Hoshipon restored was the Hero, fusing him with the Almighty and thus transforming him into the Uberhero (essentially, a stronger version of Hero), augmenting his powers.

Together, they found Hatapon and, after using the Pon drum along with Hatapon, the Uberhero learns how to use them. They also restored three other Patapons, Ton Yaripon, Chin Tatepon and Kan Yumipon, forming the Trifecta and brought the petrified Meden along with them to their new Hideout, where they (and the player) are then introduced to the new shops, barracks, the Herogate, and the rest of the new features. The Uberhero and the Trifecta traverse the lairs of the Seven Archfiends, namely, Valor (Wrath, Ragewolf), Purity (Lust, Naughtyfins), Justice (Pride, Sonarchy), Earnestness (Greed, Ravenous), Restraint (Gluttony, Buzzcrave), Adamance (Sloth, Slogturtle) and Tolerance (Envy/Acedia, Miss Covet-Hiss), with bosses Accursed Dodonga, Gaeen, Kanogias, Shookle, Cioking, Dettankarmen and Arch Pandara. After defeating Arch Pandara, the Trifecta with Hatapon march through Earthend, while Uberhero sleeps soundly. All in all, the Patapons, at last, finally, have found Earthend, and gazed at IT.

== Gameplay ==
The PSP face buttons (△ ○ × □) each represent a drum, which must be struck in accordance with an established rhythm in order to give instructions to a trio of Patapons. The main new addition being the "Uberhero" who acts as the player's avatar and is the character that physically beats the drums rather than the omnipresent god previously.

The multiplayer gameplay has been expanded and will feature more heavily. A competitive mode with four-way battles has been added, complementing the co-op system. Every level will be playable in multiplayer mode and can be played by a single player or with a total of eight players. It can be played over the internet or locally with another PlayStation Portable. Progression of characters is based on a new experience point system.

Communication in the multiplayer mode is done via a "Pata-Text" chat system.

== Development and release ==
The game was revealed during the Electronic Entertainment Expo 2010. It was released on April 12, 2011 in North America, April 15, 2011 in Europe and on April 28, 2011 in Japan.

== Reception ==
Reception

Aggregate score
Aggregator	Score
Metacritic	74/100

Review scores
Publication	Score
Famitsu	9, 9, 10, 9/10
Game Informer	6.75/10
GameSpot	8/10
IGN	9/10
Joystiq	2.5/5
Pocket Gamer	3.5/5

Patapon 3 is considered "mixed or average" according to Metacritic. Famitsu inducted the game into their Platinum Hall of Fame.
