= Ball Bullet Gun =

1995 video game

Ball Bullet Gun: Survival Game Simulation
- Developer: I'MAX
- Publisher: I'MAX
- Platform: Super Famicom
- Release: December 1, 1995
- Genre: Tactical RPG
- Modes: Single-player, multiplayer

Ball Bullet Gun (Note: Japanese: B.B.GUN 〜ボール・ブレット・ガン〜, Hepburn: Bōru Buretto Gan) is a 1995 tactical role-playing game released by I'MAX for the Super Famicom. It features airsoft battles with about 50 different weapons and seven different fields, including forests and offices.

== Reception and legacy ==
Jugem promoted the game as being entertaining for both children and adults. Obscure Video Games, a website that covers games that are not widely known by English speakers, strongly recommended it.

Gan Dōjō 2, a website dedicated to airsoft, praised the game, reporting that its rules have a realistic approach to the sport. Survival Navigation, another specialized airsoft website, regarded it as a hidden gem for the console.

The title received an English-language fan translation in 2004.

It was added to Project EGG, a licensed emulation platform, in February 2011.
