= Surugadai University =

University in Hannō, Saitama, Japan

- Type: Private
- Established: 1987
- Endowment: $601 million
- President: Masayuki Kawamura (川村正幸)
- Academic staff: 142
- Undergraduates: 4,026
- Postgraduates: 109
- Location: Hanno, Saitama, Japan; 35°49′57.05″N 139°20′1.24″E
- Campus: Small city, 200 acres (81 ha)
- Colors: Blue and green
- Nickname: Sundai
- Website: www.surugadai.ac.jp

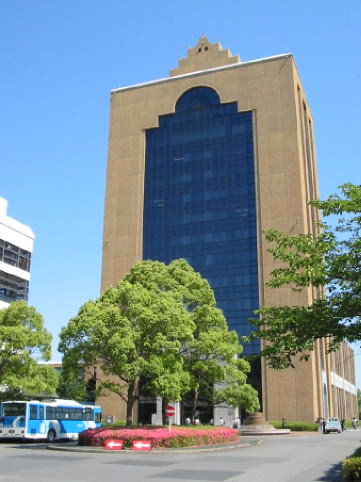
Surugadai University School of Economics

Surugadai University (駿河台大学, Surugadai daigaku) is a private university in Hannō, Saitama, Japan, established in 1987. Aiming to produce people who can contribute to today's internationalized, information-oriented society, the university places emphasis on thorough small-class teaching, foreign language education, acquisition of rich computer skills, and preparation for certifying examinations.

== History ==
Surugadai University was founded by Haruyuki Yamazaki (山崎春之) (1926-2010). His father, Toshiharu Yamazaki (山崎寿春), was one of the early Japanese students studying abroad in the Meiji period. He was accomplished as a Harvard- and Yale-trained scholar of English literature and a professor of Meiji University. Toshiharu successfully established a cram school, Sundai Preparatory School for high school students and had a lifelong dream of establishing an American-style liberal arts college in Japan.

Taking over the cram school and following his father's wishes, Haruyuki established Surugadai University as a college of law in 1987.

Since then, the college has evolved into a university of five undergraduate faculties and four graduate schools.

== Campus ==
Surugadai University occupies a 200-acre (0.81 km^{2}) campus, with over 12 buildings, including the Kougi-Tou (講義棟) (Lecture building); Dai-Ni Kougi-Tou (第二講義棟) (Lecture building No. 2); Seminar Tou (ゼミナール棟) (Seminar building); Honbu Kanri-Tou (本部管理棟) (Administrative center building); the Media Center (library); the Frontier Towers dormitories; the Haruyuki Yamazaki memorial sports gymnasium.

== Undergraduate ==
Surugadai University has five undergraduate faculties: Faculty of Law, Faculty of Economics, Faculty of Media and Information Resources, Faculty of Contemporary Cultures, and Faculty of Psychology.
