= Omotesando Hills =

Shopping centre in Tokyo, Japan

Coordinates: 35.66725°N 139.70874°E

logo

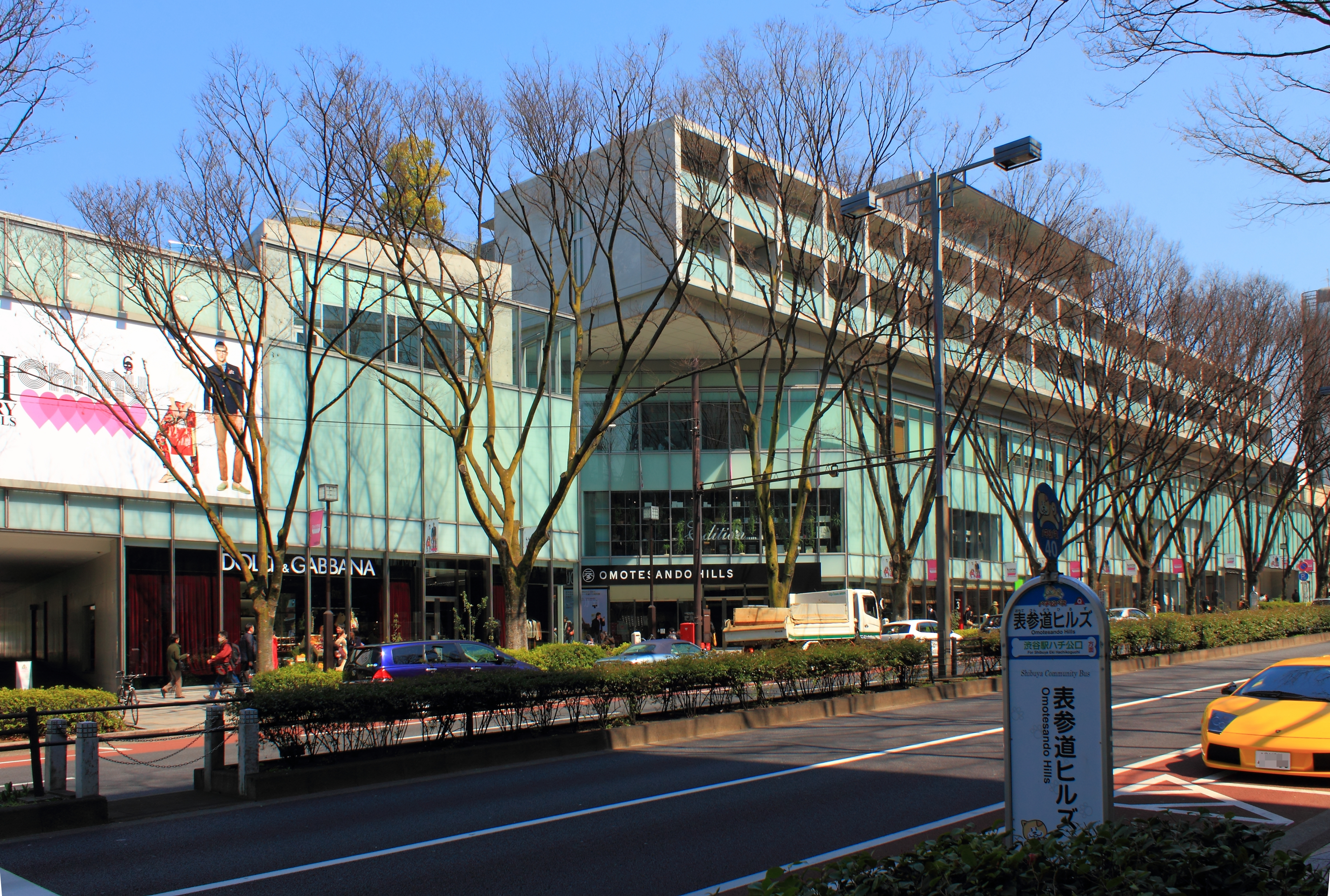
Omotesando Hills

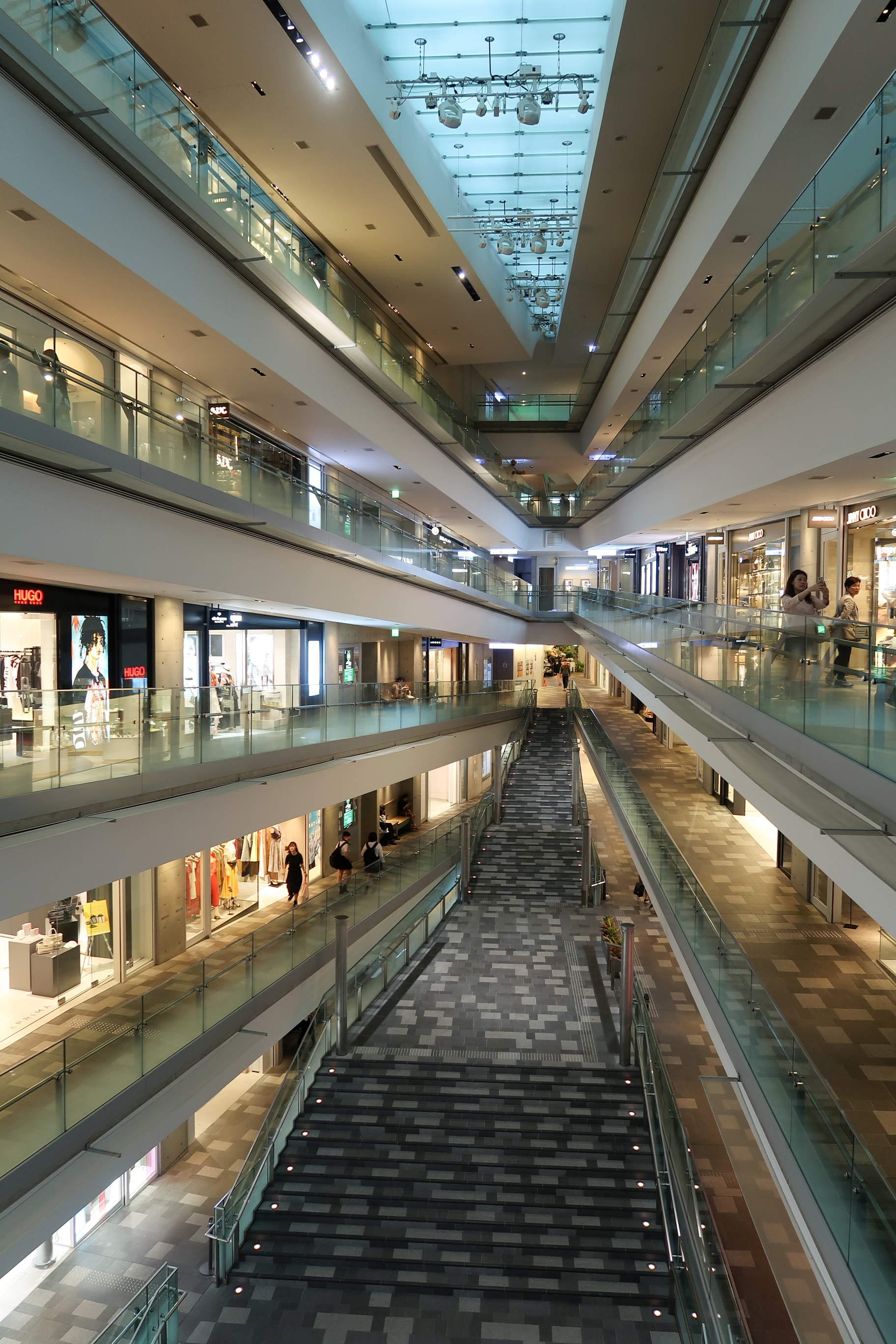
Interior of the shopping mall

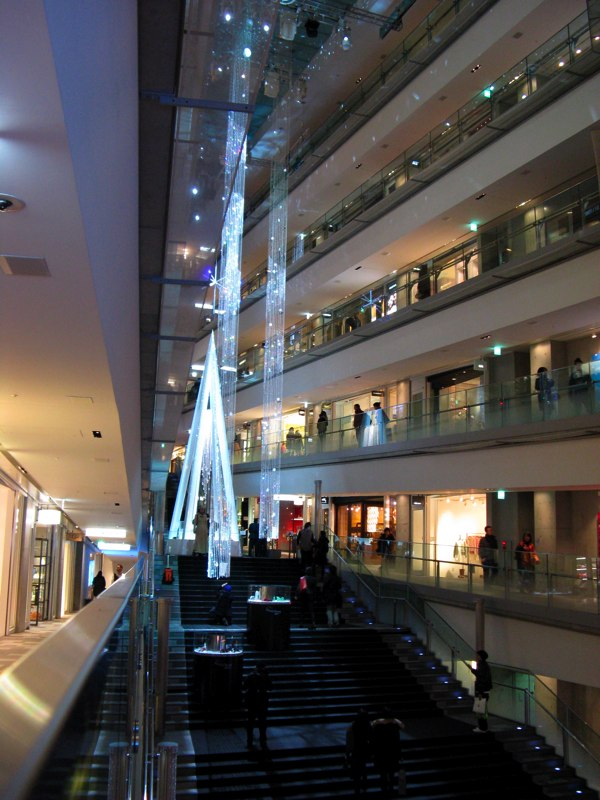
Inside Omotesando Hills during Christmas season

Omotesando Hills (表参道ヒルズ, Omotesandō hiruzu) is a shopping complex in central Tokyo built in 2005 in a series of urban developments by Mori Building. It occupies a 250-meter stretch of Omotesandō, a shopping and (previously) residential road in Aoyama. It was designed by Studio PDP, and contains over 130 shops and 38 apartments.

The construction of Omotesando Hills, built at a cost of $330 million, was marked by controversy. The building replaced the Bauhaus-inspired Dōjunkai Aoyama Apartments, which had been built in 1927 after the 1923 Kantō earthquake. The demolition of the apartments again raised questions about Japan's interest in preserving historic buildings. A small section of the old apartments is reconstructed in the south-east part of the new complex. Minoru Mori noted that there had been resistance from local landowners to the use of Ando as architect, saying that they were concerned that his buildings were too fashionable for the area. Regarding the construction, Ando said, "It's not Tadao Ando as an architect who has decided to rebuild and make shops, it was the owners themselves who wanted it to be new housing and to get some value with shops below. My task was how to do it in the best way.”
