= Patapon =

2007 video game

- European box art
- Developers: Pyramid; Japan Studio (Note: Replay developed by sAs)
- Publisher: Sony Computer Entertainment (Note: Replay published by Bandai Namco Entertainment)
- Director: Ejun
- Producer: Junichi Yoshizawa
- Designer: Hiroyuki Kotani
- Programmer: Hayato Ikeda
- Artist: Rolito
- Composers: Kemmei Adachi; Daisuke Miyake
- Series: Patapon
- Platforms: PlayStation Portable; PlayStation 4; 1+2 Replay: Nintendo Switch; PlayStation 5; Windows
- Release: PlayStation Portable: JP: December 20, 2007; EU: February 22, 2008; NA: February 26, 2008; PlayStation 4: WW: August 1, 2017; 1+2 Replay; Nintendo Switch, PlayStation 5, Windows: WW: July 11, 2025
- Genre: Rhythm
- Mode: Single-player

Patapon (Note: Japanese: パタポン) is a 2007 rhythm video game developed by Pyramid and Japan Studio and published by Sony Computer Entertainment for the PlayStation Portable. The game's unique genre was described to be a combination of rhythm and strategy. Its concept and design were conceived when game designer Hiroyuki Kotani discovered the Patapon designs from French artist Rolito's personal website. The name Patapon was created by Rolito and was inspired by an old French song for children. Kotani chose the name because it sounded similar to marching and drumming. The game was released in Japan in December 2007 and in February 2008 in North America and Europe.

In the game, the player acts as an invisible deity to a tribe of anthropomorphic eyeballs known as "Patapons" that can be commanded to move forward, attack, defend and retreat by using a sequence of drum beats. The story follows the Patapon tribe in their journey to reach Earthend and gaze upon "IT". They encounter giant beasts and an enemy tribe known as the Zigotons that serve as obstacles throughout their adventure.

Patapon was well-received among critics, with multiple reviewers praising the art style of the Patapon tribe and the music. Some reviewers criticized the repetitive nature of it and the lack of a pause option. The game received multiple nominations including a BAFTA award and won Best PSP Game of 2008 by IGN. The game was followed up by two sequels for the PSP; Patapon 2 and Patapon 3. A remastered version for the PlayStation 4 was released in 2017, with another remaster, bundled with its sequel as Patapon 1+2 Replay, released on Nintendo Switch, PlayStation 5 and Windows in 2025.

== Gameplay ==
Gameplay of Patapon. The Patapon tribe (left) is attacking the Zigoton tribe (right).

In Patapon, the player takes the role of a deity worshipped by an anthropomorphic eye-ball army known as Patapons. The Patapon village named "Patapolis" serves as the main hub, allowing the player to revive fallen troops, select missions, and play minigames. Before each mission, the player can choose up to three different units for battle with the banner-wielding Hatapon as the leader of the units. There are eight possible units to choose from: The shield and sword-wielding Tatepons, the spear-wielding Yaripons, the bow and arrow-wielding Yumipons, the cavalry lance-wielding Kibapons, the heavy club-wielding Dekapons, bird-riding Toripons (only in Patapon 2), magic-wielding Mahopons (only in Patapon 2 onwards), and Tuba-wielding Megapons. Each unit can have a maximum of three or six troops depending on the type of Patapon.

During missions, the player can command the Patapons by inputting specific sequences using the face buttons on the PSP, each representing a drum. These sequences can command the tribe to move forward, attack, defend, and other actions. A pulsating border signals the player at what rhythm to input the commands. Successfully entering a proper sequence in sync with the rhythm will lead the tribe into a "Fever" increasing their attack and defensive bonuses. Fever can be accomplished by maintaining a combination of 10, or achieved early if a combination is 3 or higher and the command was performed perfectly in sync. If the player ceases to command the Patapons or inputs the commands off-beat of the border's rhythm, the combo and fever will be lost. During fever, Miracles can be performed that affect the weather. Examples include summoning rain to cool a scorching desert or summoning strong winds assisting in the range of the Yumipons' arrows.

Once a mission is complete, the player can return to an earlier mission to acquire additional resources and equipment to build up their troops before a larger battle. Materials, weapons, armour, and a currency known as "Ka-ching" can be gained by fallen enemies to fortify the player's troops. If a Patapon is defeated in battle, it will drop a cap that can be used to revive the Patapon once the mission is completed. If the cap is not retrieved during the mission, the Patapon is permanently lost. New Patapons can be created in the Patapon village using the tree of life and requires Ka-ching and materials such as sticks, stones, and branches. Using rarer versions of those materials creates stronger variants of the Patapons.

== Plot ==
Patapon follows the tribe of the eponymous eyeball-like creatures, Patapons. In the distant past, the Patapons were a flourishing nation led by their deity, the Mighty Patapon, on a journey to Earthend to gaze upon an enigmatic object known as "IT". The Patapons at one point were banished to the desolate frontier by their sworn enemy of similar eyeball-like creatures known as the Zigotons. The game begins with the Mighty Patapon reuniting with the banner-wielding Hatapon. The Mighty Patapon is led back to the remnants of the tribe to resume their journey to Earthend. The Patapon face large enemies throughout their travels and re-encounter the Zigoton empire. The Zigoton general, Gong the Hawkeye, challenged the Patapons multiple times by provoking them using Patapon hostages and eventually having a final duel. Shortly before his death, Gong reveals to them that the Zigotons have their version of the prophecy foretelling that the world will fall into chaos when the Patapons gaze at "IT".

As the Patapons progress on their journey, many of the Zigoton warriors sell their souls to the dark forces in exchange for power in an attempt to defeat them. Eventually, the ruler of the Zigotons, Queen Kharma, sells her soul in a final effort to destroy the Patapons. When she is defeated, a gateway to the Dark World unleashes the ancient demon, Gorl. The Patapons manage to defeat Gorl and reach the coastline to witness the sunrise which they assume is Earthend and "IT" respectively. However, unfulfilled by the anticlimactic end of their journey, they realize the rising sun is not "IT" and they have not reached Earthend. Queen Kharma joins the Patapons and admits that the Zigotons also fooled themselves into believing the sun was "IT". The game concludes with the Patapons and Zigotons working together to build a ship.

== Development and release ==
Concept art revealing the development process of Patapon

Patapon was developed by Pyramid, produced by Japan Studio, and designed by Hiroyuki Kotani. The game was originally announced on June 11, 2007, during the E3 2007 press conference. The designs for the Patapons were created in 2002 by French artist Rolito and were featured on his personal website in 2004. When Kotani discovered their design, he envisioned the creatures marching into battle and chose to create a video game entirely based on their design. Kotani contacted Rolito through a representative group known as Interlink in 2005 and recruited him to develop the game using the Patapon characters. Rolito was tasked with creating a fictional universe for the characters. The development team would provide drafts and be evaluated by Rolito. Once approved, Rolito would provide the final design. The name "Patapon" was conceived by Rolito taken from an old French nursery rhyme that used the word "Patapon" for children. Kotani chose the name due to it resembling the sounds of drums and marching.

The game developed for two years with the first 21 months developing the prototype and the remaining 3 months dedicated to mass production. Kotani aimed to create a game that never existed before but also to make the game simple. Kotani recruited Pyramid to develop their game based on their previous work. The original concept of Patapon was to control the characters using adjectives and complex grammar, however, was simplified to making the commands more onomatopoeic once the name was decided. Due to Patapon having a unique genre with no established name, Kotani dubbed the genre "Command Carnival". The game was developed with the ability to be played as a simple game and as a complex game depending on the player's preference. One of the most difficult challenges to develop was the dialogue for the enemy army, Zigoton, due to the player possibly unable to read it during gameplay.

Kemmei Adachi served as composer while Kotani wrote the lyrics. Kemmei was recruited from the game's conception and proposed ideas to develop the game. Music was composed of multiple African instruments. Pyramid proposed to make the Patapons sing back to the player once a command was sent. Vocals for the songs were provided by Kotani's son who was 10 years old at the time.

Patapon was released in Japan on December 20, 2007. It was later released in Europe on February 22, 2008, and in North America on February 26, 2008. To promote the game, an event was held from December 5 to December 17, 2007 at the Sample Lab in Omotesandō, Tokyo. A demo was released on February 7, 2008 in Japan. A different demo for North America and Europe was released later on February 14, 2008 and included an exclusive weapon that can be transferred to the full release. The game was ported onto PlayStation 4 under the title Patapon Remastered and was released worldwide on August 1, 2017.

A second remaster, bundled with its sequel as Patapon 1+2 Replay, was released for the Nintendo Switch, PlayStation 5 and Windows on July 12, 2025 by Bandai Namco Entertainment. Developed by sAs, developer of the Theatrhythm series, it further enhances on gameplay and graphics from the original. Multiplayer is exclusive to the Nintendo Switch version.

== Reception ==
Reception

Aggregate score
Aggregator	Score
Metacritic	PSP: 86/100; PS4: 72/100

Review scores
Publication	Score
1Up.com	A
Edge	8/10
Eurogamer	8/10
Famitsu	9/9/8/9
Game Informer	8.75/10
GameDaily	9/10
GamePro	4.4/5
GameSpot	9/10
IGN	9.2/10
PALGN	9/10
Pocket Gamer	4.5/5
X-Play	4/5

Patapon received "generally favorable reviews" according to review aggregator website Metacritic. IGN's Jeff Hayes considers Patapon, "not only one of the best rhythm games ever released, it's also one of the best titles for the PSP." GameSpot reviewer Justin Calvert gave Patapon cited its excellent art design and innovative gameplay. Nick Suttner of 1UP.com noted its understated strategic depth despite the game's faults. Game Informer reviewer Bryan Vore praised the game, calling it "an extremely absorbing gameplay experience". Vore further commended the variety of minigames and missions and noted how it prevented it from becoming a repetitive endeavor. GamePro's Cameron Lewis appreciated the depth of the gameplay, in particular on subtle markers and hidden objects which he deemed vital to progressing the game. Eurogamer reviewer Dave McCarthy praised the gameplay, calling it hypnotic and trance-like and not too complicated to control. Tracy Erickson of Pocket Gamer was pleased that the game wasn't likely to be completed in a single playthrough, noting it had many hours worth of gameplay.

Despite the positive response to the gameplay, multiple reviewers also had criticism towards it. Luke Mitchell of PALGN and Hayes were disappointed in the lack of a pause option during missions. Vore found fault in the reliance of chance for weapon and army-upgrading material drops. Both Hayes and McCarthy made similar criticism for requiring to replay previous missions to obtain resources. X-Play reviewer Gus Mastrapa noted the gameplay can feel like a grind and also criticized the minigames for requiring up to three songs to obtain a specific item.

In regards to the visual style, it was received with praise by multiple reviewers. Mitchell complimented the art design, calling it cute and comparing it to paper cut-outs. Lewis called the art style "eye-catching" and noted the Patapon tribe being full of personality. Hayes made similar comments, compared it to playing a cartoon and how expressive the Patapon tribes are. GameDaily reviewer Grant Holzhauer compared the art to the classic children's book, Where the Wild Things Are. Mastrapa praised the art style by calling it gorgeous, however, noted that it may be too cute for some. Erickson described the visuals as an impossibly stylish 2-D world with the Patapon tribe as unbearably cute.

The music of Patapon was received positively by multiple reviews and described the game as "catchy". Multiple reviewers also noted the command for attack (Pon-Pon-Pata-Pon) and march (Pata-Pata-Pata-Pon) to be stuck in their head or be chanted after playing the game. Mitchell particularly praised the music changing when reaching Fever mode. Calvert gave the music a mixed reaction, stating that it's either going to be loved or hated.

The game has sold 229,000 copies in North America by January 2009. Famitsu inducted into their Hall of Fame under their "Platinum" rank. GameSpot nominated it in their "Best of 2008" awards for "Best Graphic, Artistic", "Best original game mechanic", "Best original IP", "Best Rhythm/Music game", "Best PSP game" and won "Best original music" and "Most innovative game". IGN awarded the game for Best Music/Rhythm game, Best Artistic Design, Best Original Score, Best New IP, and PSP Game of the Year. Patapon was nominated at the 5th British Academy Games Awards for the Handheld category. During the 12th Annual Interactive Achievement Awards, the Academy of Interactive Arts & Sciences nominated Patapon for "Hand-Held Game of the Year" and "Casual Game of the Year".

== Sequels and legacy ==
Patapon inspired two sequels for the PSP titled Patapon 2 and Patapon 3, becoming the first entry in a trilogy. Patapon 2 was released in Japan on November 27, 2008. It introduced new Patapon units, a customizable Hero character that can be used in multiplayer with a total of four players, and an evolution system to upgrade Patapons. Patapon 3 was released in Japan on April 28, 2011. In 2013, Chinese developer Beijing Q&D created an unauthorized clone under the title PATAPON - Siege Of WOW! for iOS. A video game inspired by Patapon and Advance Wars titled Jungle Rumble: Freedom, Happiness, and Bananas was developed by indie developer Disco Pixel and released on May 1, 2014 for iOS and Android.

A spiritual successor to the series known as Ratatan was announced by Ratata Arts and Tokyo Virtual Theory. Hiroyuki Kotani serves as director with Kemmei Adachi as director and game designer, Kemmei Adachi as composer, and Kazuto Sakajiri as producer. Initially unveiled at BitSummit 2023, a Kickstarter campaign for Ratatan went live on August 1, 2023 to support the project. The game launched into early access on September 19, 2025, and fully released on October 15, 2026.
