= Merrell Vories Hitotsuyanagi =

American architect

- 一柳 米来留
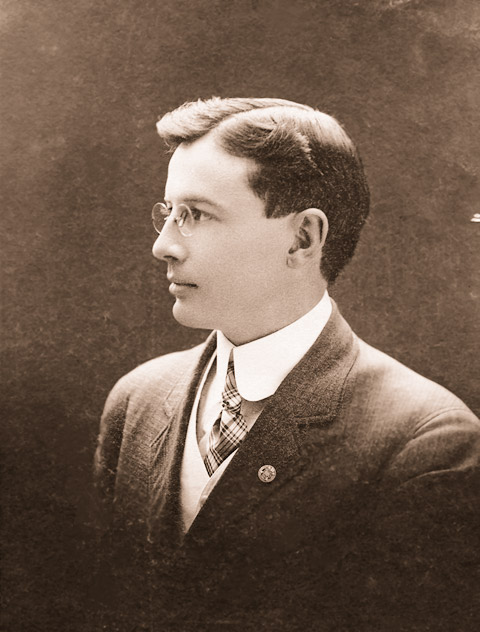
- Vories (circa 1905)
- Born: William Merrell Vories; October 28, 1880; Leavenworth, Kansas, U.S.
- Died: May 7, 1964 (aged 83); Ōmihachiman, Shiga Prefecture, Japan
- Monuments: Vories Commemorative Museum
- Other name: Mereru Hitotsuyanagi
- Citizenship: Japanese (from 1941)
- Education: Colorado College
- Occupations: educator, architect, entrepreneur, missionary
- Employer(s): Vories & Co. (founder); Omi Sales Company (founder)
- Organization: Omi Brotherhood (founder)
- Known for: founder of the Omi Mission in Japan
- Notable work: College Memories and Other Rimes, Much of Which Has Appeared Before in the Colorado College Tiger (1903); A mustard seed in Japan (1911); Poems of the East and West (1960)
- Spouse: Makiko Hitotsuyanagi (m. 1919)

Merrell Vories Hitotsuyanagi, also known as Mereru Hitotsuyanagi (一柳 米来留, Hitotsuyanagi Mereru); born William Merrell Vories (October 28, 1880 – May 7, 1964), was an educator, architect, entrepreneur, Christian lay missionary, and founder of the Omi Mission. Born in the United States, he later became a naturalized Japanese citizen.

Merrell lived and worked mainly in Shiga Prefecture in Japan. With only limited formal training as an architect, he founded an architectural office in Shiga which employed over thirty professional staff and was responsible for the design of well over 1000 residential, commercial, and church structures in Japan and occupied Korea, prior to the Second World War.

== Biography ==
Vories was born in Leavenworth, Kansas in 1880. He graduated from Colorado College in 1904. At first, he hoped to be an architect, although he came to Japan in 1905 as an English-language teacher, with an intention to engage in Christian missionary work. While working as a teacher in Omihachiman, Shiga Prefecture, in 1908 he was dismissed from teaching job because his Bible Classes had attracted over one third of his class among others who were aligned with local Buddhist temples. Vories had been asked to inspect the construction of an Omihachiman YMCA office building in 1907, which became his first work as an architect in Japan. (Note: The Hachiman YMCA Hachiman Christian Youth Hall (八幡キリスト教青年会館, Hachiman kirisutokyō seinen kaikan) building was relocated and renewed in another address in Omihaachiman in 1935 with sponsorship granted by Harbert Andrews, called Memorial Herbert Andrews Y.M.C.A. designated as Registered Tangible Cultural Properties (Structures) (登録有形文化財(建造物), Tōroku yūkei bunkazai (kenzōbutsu)) of Japan among other Vories' architecture in September 2009.) He opened his office for architectural design in 1908 and in the following year, he founded "Vories & Co." along with Lester Chapin, an architect, and Etsuzō Yoshida, his English class student. They held it initially in Kyoto and moved to Ōmihachiman to accommodate for their success.

Through YMCA activities in Japan, Vories became acquainted with many American and Japanese people, and received numerous commissions to design houses, churches, schools, hospitals, and YMCA facilities near and far. As many as 1,600 buildings can be credited to Vories' designs.

In 1918, he founded the Omi Mission, and devoted his efforts to Christian missionary work and education.

In 1919, Vories married the daughter of viscount Suenori Hitotsuyanagi, Makiko Hitotsuyanagi (一柳満喜子, Hitotsuyanagi Makiko; 1884-1969).

He established Omi Sales Company in 1920, to promote an ointment called Mentholatum to earn funds to support his missionary work.

In 1934, the Omi Mission was renamed to Omi Brotherhood (近江兄弟社, Ōmi Kyōdaisha).

Vories also loved music, and is credited with introducing the Hammond Organ into Japan. (Note: Vories came back from the States on Tatsutamaru, and an archived picture documents when he played a hammond organ for his cousin onboard. He took the first two hammond organs to Japan, and Omi Sales imported many for churches and schools. Mr.Yoshiyuki Ōhara who worked at Omi Brothers and maintained the hammond organs in 1940s remembers that Mr.Yoneyama, Vories' secretary, found a hammond organ invented in 1935 on a magazine and asked Vories to purchase one. Vories came back to Japan around 1936 to bring the first hammond organ with him, while he was said to be reluctant to use an electric keyboard before departing on a short visit to the US.) The collective of schools which were founded by the Omi Brotherhood, known as Vories Gakuen, maintain usage of the Hammond organs supplied by Vories.

In 1941, just before the attack on Pearl Harbor, Vories was naturalized as a Japanese citizen and took the name of Mereru Hitotsuyanagi as required by the Japanese law, pledged his allegiance to the nation of Japan and to the Emperor Hirohito.

In September 1945, the former Prime Minister Fumimaro Konoe asked Vories to convey a message to the SCAP on the Emperor's behalf. Vories also shared the idea of the Emperor renouncing claims of divinity and declaring his humanity. He would later go on to meet the Emperor four times.

== Death ==
In 1957, Vories suffered a stroke while he was in his summer home in Karuizawa, Nagano Prefecture and was transported back to Ōmihachiman for medical treatment. He remained bedridden for seven years and died on the second floor of his house on May 7, 1964, at the age of 83.

In 1958, Vories was awarded as the first Honorary Citizen of Omihachiman. He was posthumously honored the Order of the Sacred Treasure, 3rd class, by the Japanese government. His house in Ōmihachiman was currently the "Vories Commemorative Museum".

== Gallery ==
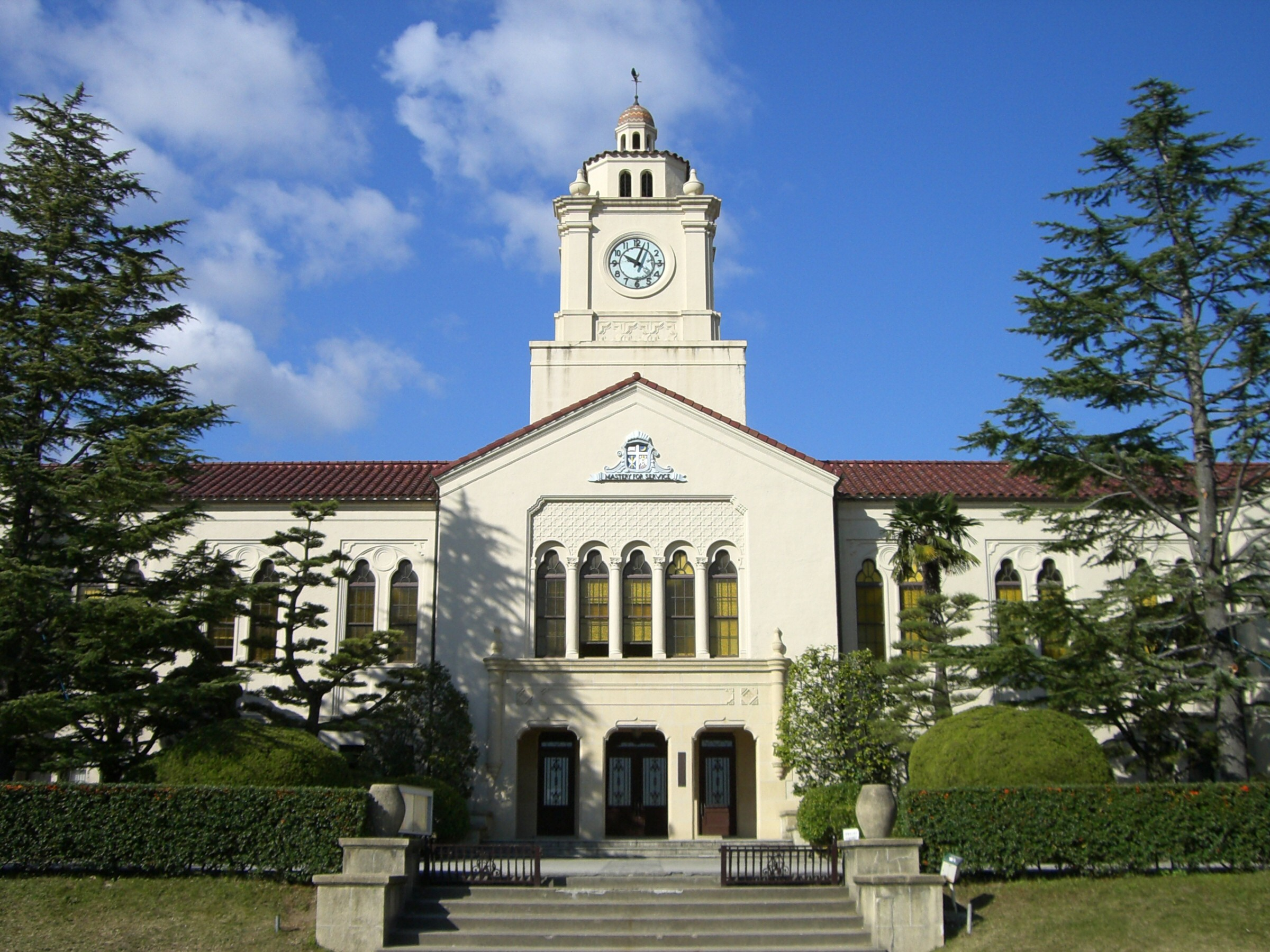
Kwansei Gakuin University

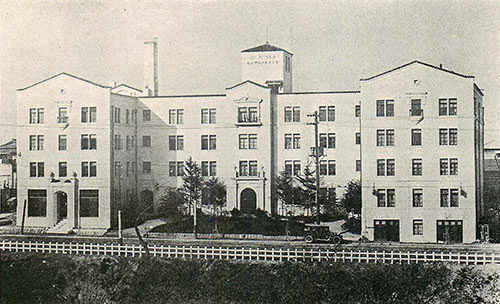
Bunka Apartments

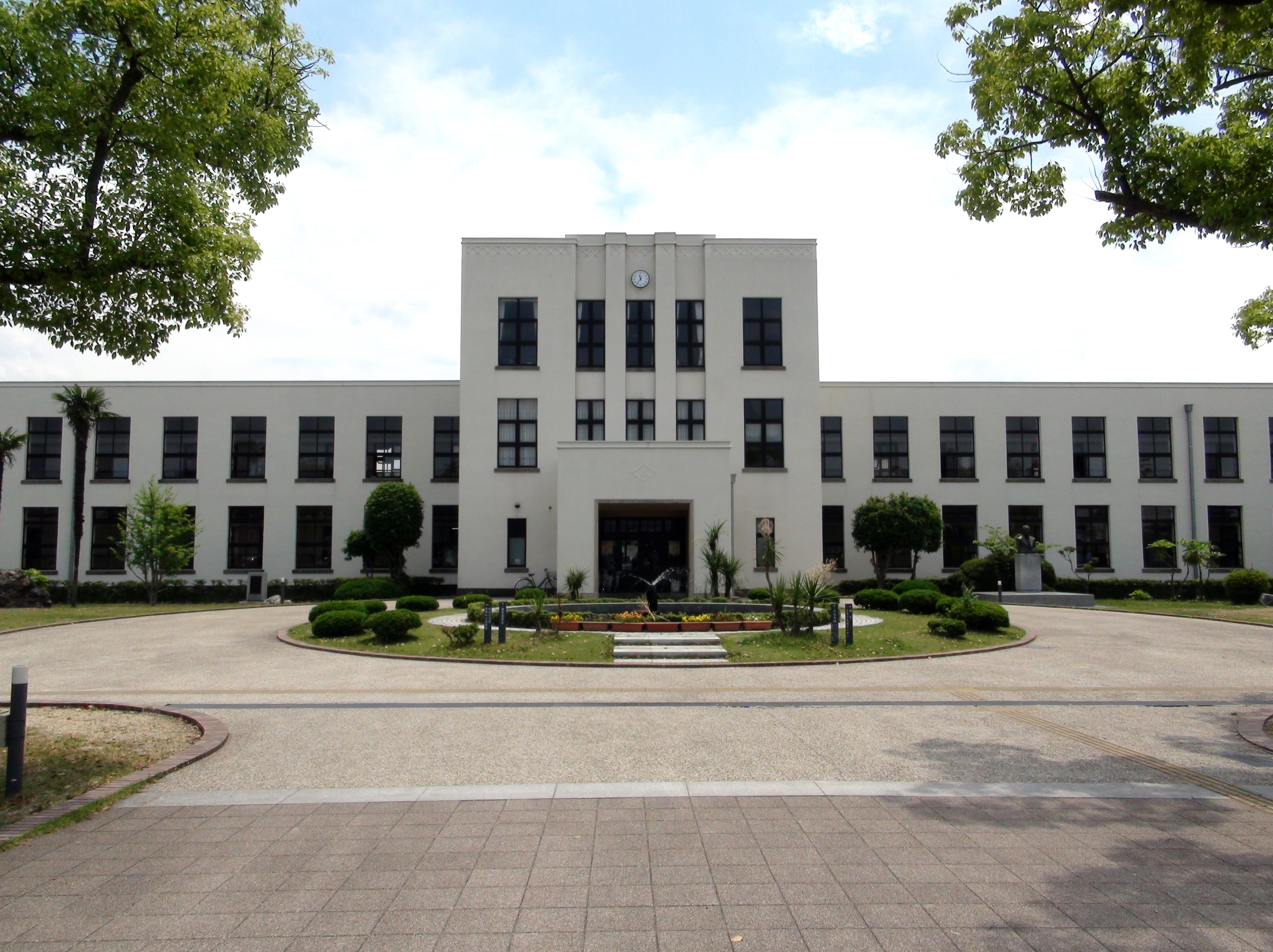
Former Toyosato Elementary School

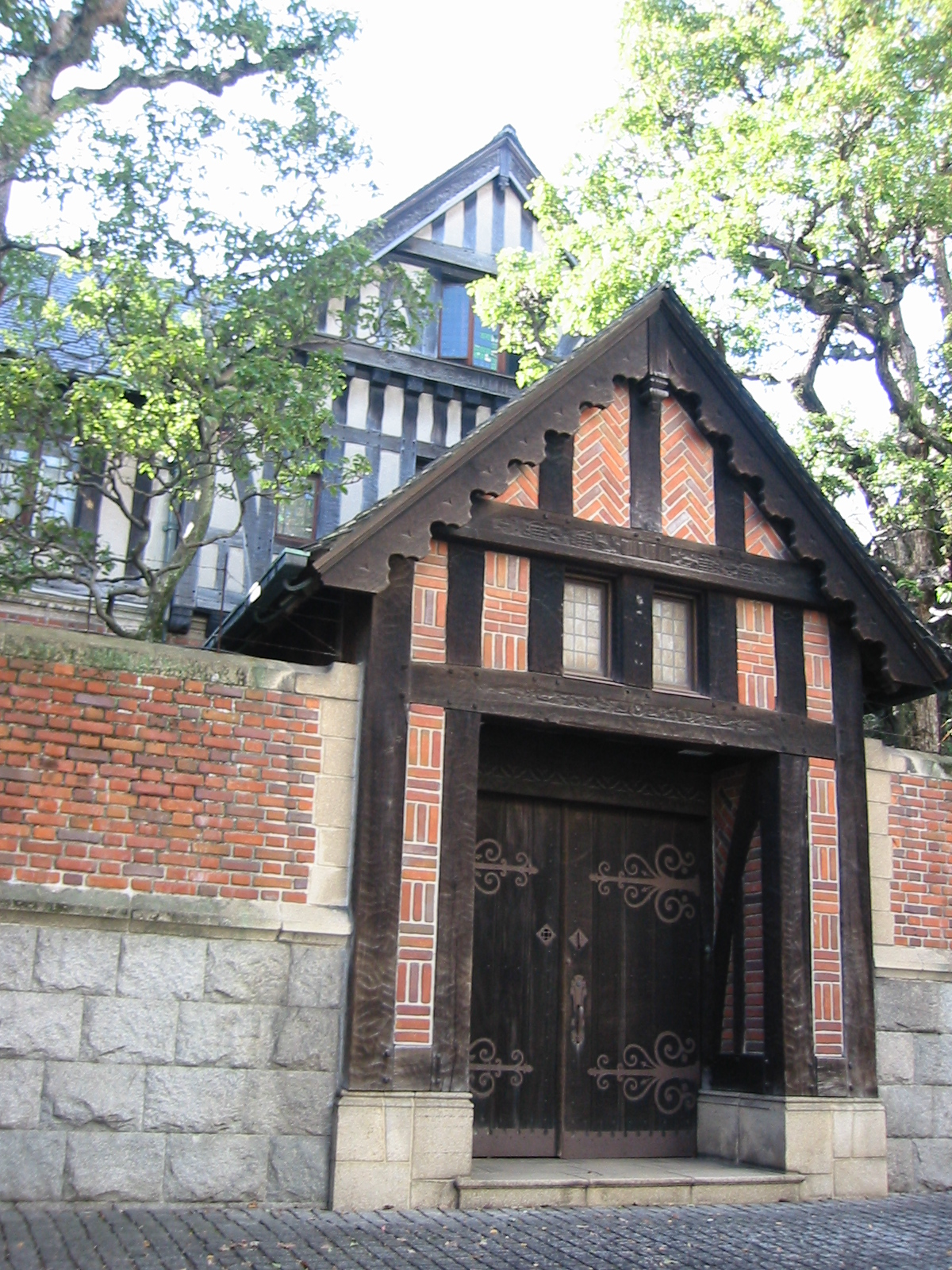
Murotani house

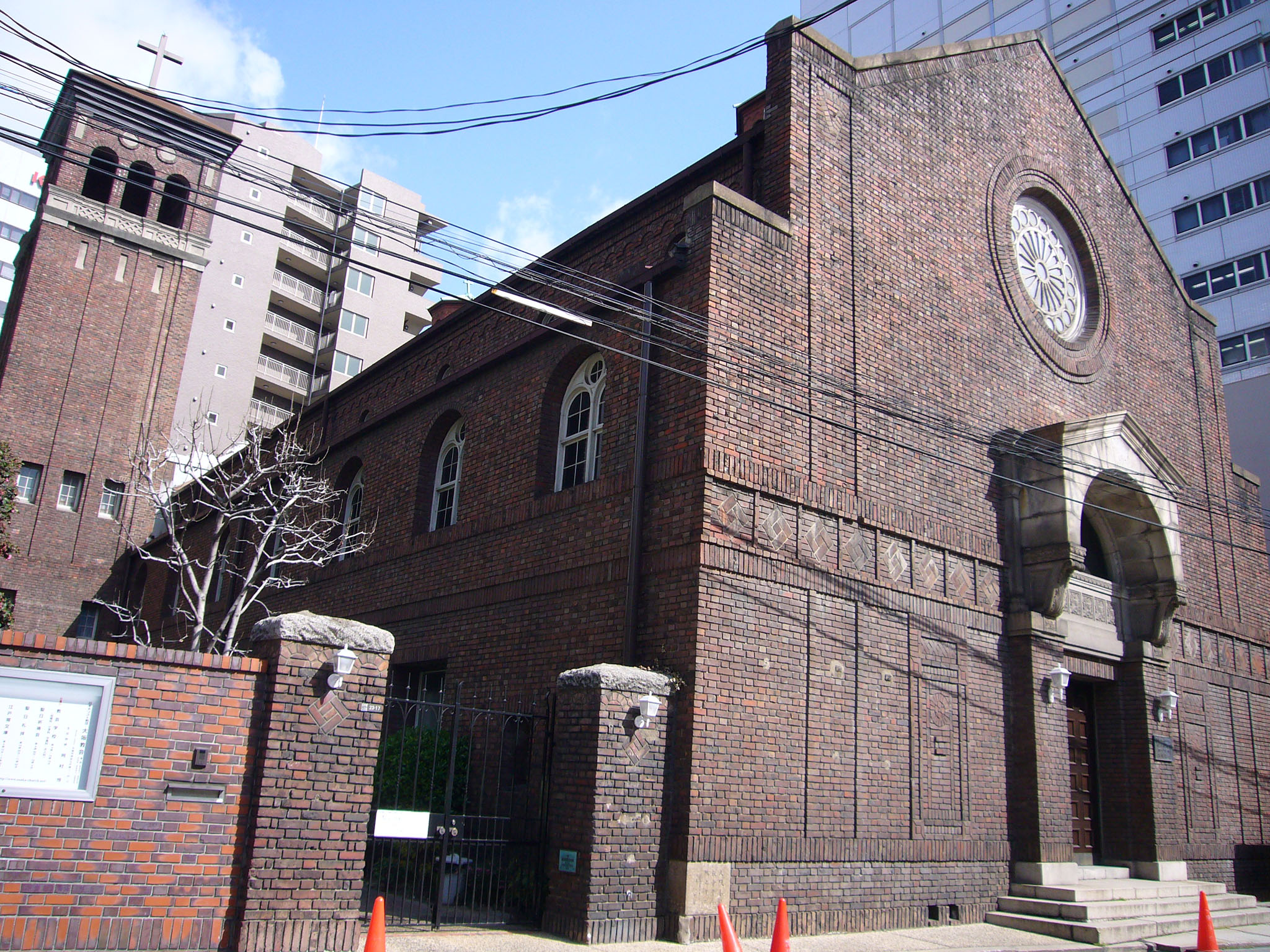
Osaka Church (the United Church of Christ in Japan)

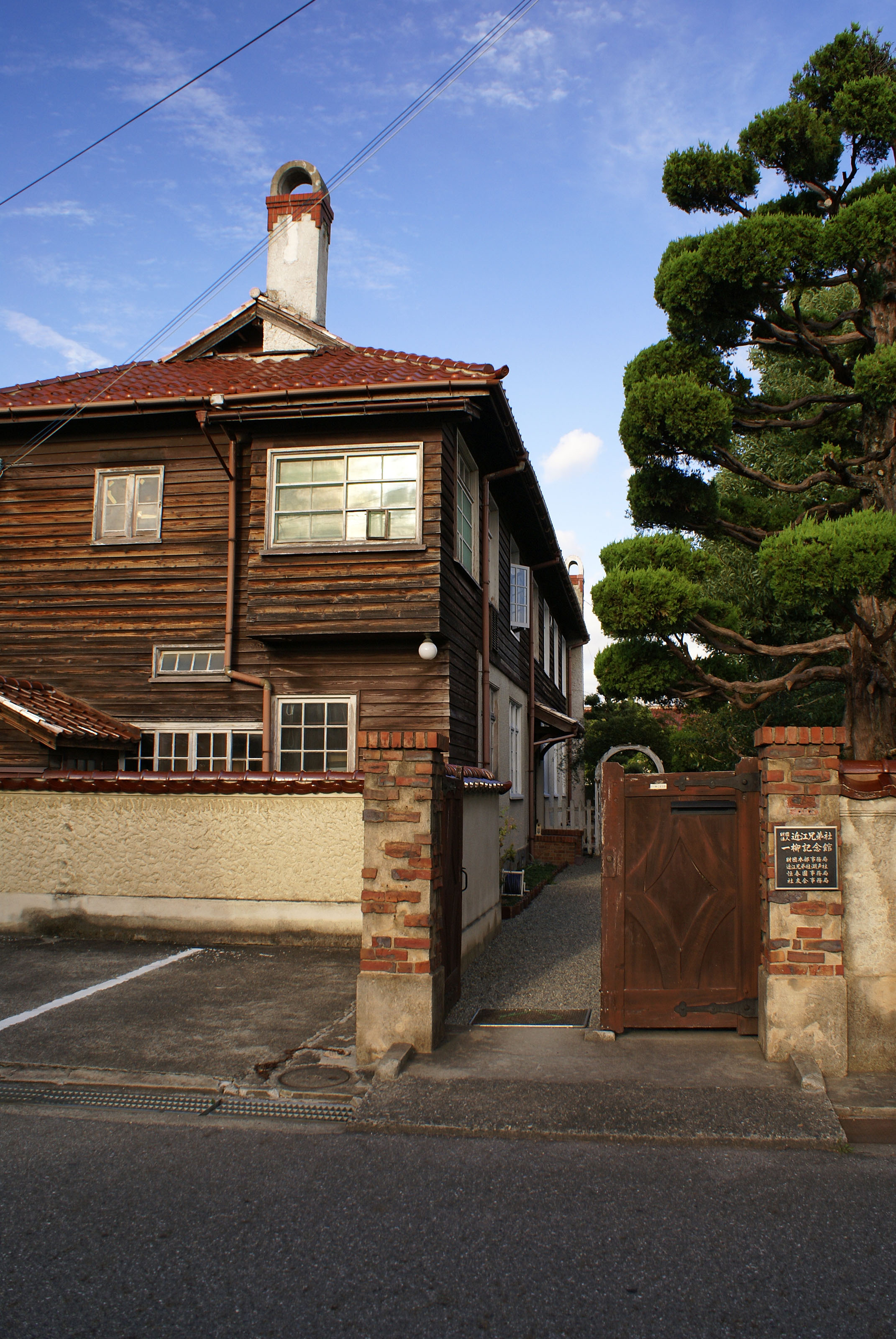
Vories memorial house

== Books ==
- "ヴォーリズの建築―ミッション・ユートピアと都市の華" 山形 政昭 1989 ISBN 4-422-50123-2
- "ヴォーリズの西洋館―日本近代住宅の先駆" 山形 政昭 2002 ISBN 4-473-01890-3
- "ウィリアム・メレル・ヴォーリズ―写真集 日本人を越えたニホン人" 山田プランニング 1998 ISBN 4-939022-99-4
- "ヴォーリズ建築の100年―恵みの居場所をつくる" 2008 ISBN 4-422-50124-0
- "ヴォーリズ評伝―日本で隣人愛を実践したアメリカ人" 奥村直彦 2005 ISBN 4-88008-332-1
- "青い目の近江商人メレル・ヴォーリズ―創業者精神「信仰と商売の両立の実践」を受け継いで" 岩原 侑 1997 ISBN 4-88737-045-8
- "青い目の近江商人ヴォーリズ外伝―「信仰と事業の両立」を果たした師ゆかりの地を歩いて" 岩原 侑 2002 ISBN 4-8355-3879-X
