= Dossun! Ganseki Battle =

1994 video game

Dossun! Ganseki Battle (Note: Japanese: どっすん!岩石バトル, Hepburn: Dossun! Ganseki Batoru) is a puzzle video game released in 1994 for the Super Famicom by I'MAX.

== Reception and legacy ==
Marçal Mora Cantallops, in his book Rompecabezas: Cinco décadas de videojuegos y puzles, regarded it as a fun game, labeling it an early precursor to Super Puzzle Fighter II Turbo and Puzzle Quest. The game has also been well received by Internet reviewers.

An English-language fan translation was created for the title in 2000. The game was added to Project EGG, a licensed emulation service, in 2011.

Pierre Taki no Shonnai TV, Pierre Taki's variety show, featured the game in 2018.
