= The Mansion of Innsmouth =

1995 video game

- Developer: Be Top
- Publisher: I'MAX
- Platform: Virtual Boy
- Release: JP: October 13, 1995
- Mode: Single player

The Mansion of Innsmouth (or Innsmouth no Yakata, (Note: Japanese: インスマウスの館, Hepburn: Insumausu no Yakata; "The Innsmouth Hall") also rendered as Insmouse no Yakata) is a 1995 video game developed by Be Top and published by I'MAX in Japan for the Virtual Boy. Assuming the role of a private detective in 1922, the player is tasked with escaping a monster-infested mansion with an artifact called the Necronomicon. The player navigates several mazelike levels that must be finished in a certain amount of time. It is loosely based on the H. P. Lovecraft novel The Shadow over Innsmouth, though the only similarity between the two is the presence of fishlike monsters. It received mixed reviews, with critics praising its Lovecraftian setting. Reception of the gameplay was mixed, with critical contemporary reviews from magazines Famitsu and VB Guide, though it was viewed positively for its ambition and uniqueness.

== Gameplay ==
A gameplay screenshot showing the player-character engaging with a creature in a first-person perspective

Innsmouth no Yakata is a first-person horror video game where players assume the role of a private detective in 1922 who must escape from a monster-infested mansion with an artifact called the Necronomicon. Each stage in the game consists of a floor within the mansion, and on each floor players must find a key and use it to open an exit door under a time limit, which varies between levels. It uses a twin-stick-style control scheme with two directional pads, one for movement and the other for the player-character's gun. Completing each stage will present players with a stage select screen, featuring branching level paths similar to the Darius series. The game automatically selects a floor based on how much time is left upon completion; finishing in under 30 seconds lets players move up a floor, while finishing in the last 30 seconds forces them to move down a floor. After completing one of the final floors, the player-character escapes and the game ends.

Throughout the game, players encounter fishlike monsters that attempt to kill the player-character. These creatures can either be overcome with bullets or by fleeing. Additional ammunition as well as health pickups are found scattered throughout the various floors. A map screen shows players' current location and the layout of the floor, which will begin to reveal itself as players progress. Two kinds of collectible orbs can be found randomly placed on each floor. The white orbs reveal the entirety of the map, while the black orbs show the locations of items on that specific floor. The game features 45 different floors, though only 13 floors can be visited in a session. It features four different endings, including a "joke" ending that sends the player back to the start of the game.

== Development and release ==
Innsmouth no Yakata was developed by Be Top and published by I'MAX on October 13, 1995 in Japan for the Virtual Boy. It is loosely based on the H. P. Lovecraft novella The Shadow over Innsmouth, though the only relation between them is the presence of fishlike monsters. Akin to all other Virtual Boy games, it uses a red-and-black color scheme and projects two slightly different images in each eye hole to simulate depth. Its limited release and launch towards the end of the Virtual Boy's short lifespan has since made it a prized collector's item.

Innsmouth no Yakata was added to the Nintendo Classics service as one of seven Virtual Boy launch titles, including in the west for the first time as The Mansion of Innsmouth, on February 17, 2026.

== Reception ==
Reception

Review scores
Publication	Score
Famitsu	6/10, 7/10, 6/10, 5/10 (Note: Each of the four reviewers in Famitsu scored the game on a ten point scale)
Nintendo Life	5/10

Initial reviews for Innsmouth no Yakata were lukewarm. Famitsu was critical towards the game's lack of ambition and the presence of a time limit, saying that most players would not be able to fully immerse themselves in its world due to the short length of the timer. They unfavorably compared it to Dungeon Master (1987), disliking its limited ammunition and a relatively low level of difficulty. VB Guide felt similarly about the game, criticizing its gameplay and horror elements. However, they felt the presentation was good. Despite the more negative reception, Nintendo Magazine felt that its horror-themed locations and role-playing elements would make it a success in Japan.

Retrospectively, it has been met with a similarly mixed response. Writer Jeremy Parish found Innsmouth no Yakata to be an exception to the Virtual Boy's otherwise lackluster Japan-only catalog, praising its "hyper-focused design" and for effective use of the Virtual Boy's red-and-black color scheme to work with the Lovecraftian setting. Meanwhile, Benji Edwards of PC Magazine, while commenting that it was not great, praised the difficulty and Lovecraftian setting for enhancing the experience. Official Nintendo Magazine staff were more critical, calling its controls "awful" and sprites "ugly." Dave Frear of Nintendo Life felt that the game was worthwhile conceptually, citing the number of levels and endings, as well as being a rare first-person Virtual Boy game. However, he was similarly critical of the controls and animations, also contending that the combat was not interesting. This criticism of the gameplay was echoed by Retro Gamer staff, who called it and its environment repetitive while also criticizing that the game's password system and time limit harmed the atmosphere and tension of the game. Its impact on future games has been discussed as well. Both Anthony John Agnello for The A.V. Club and Hardcore Gaming 101 considered it a precursor to the twin-stick movement control style found in first-person shooters and virtual reality horror games respectively. The video game Ritualistic Madness took inspiration from Innsmouth no Yakata.
