= Super Keirin =

1995 video game

- Cover art
- Developer: Be Top
- Publisher: I'Max
- Platform: Super Famicom
- Release: JP: July 14, 1995
- Genre: Biking
- Mode: Single-player (story or party)

Super Keirin (スーパー競輪, Super Keirin) is a Japanese-exclusive video game with gambling/life sim elements, where players take control of their character and make money by betting on cycle races at the local Velodrome.

Cute anime-style graphics are employed throughout the game; stating that the premise of the game is less serious than other Super NES gambling style video games.

== Gameplay ==
The shopping district is where gamers go to get their supplies for the next cycling race.

The gameplay is similar to a miniature version of a role-playing video game.

Before each race, players can buy supplies from a drug store, a 24-hour variety store, and a clothing store. Interaction with non-player characters is possible while at the shopping district. Players can also gamble on other bicycle racing events by buying parimutuel tickets, and can obtain a newspaper to find out the results from other races within the downtown area of the game.

There are nine competitors and five laps in a typical race. Every track that can be raced on using a bicycle is a velodrome with four superelevated turns that are typical of most velodromes. Riders do not always travel at full speed or at a specific radius, necessitating a balance between aggressive riding and passive riding. All information for particular races is visible on an information bank included within the racing screen. Players choose between story and party modes, which provide different perspectives on bicycle racing lifestyle.

== Reception ==
On release, Famicom Tsūshin scored the game a 23 out of 40.

== See also ==
- Nakano Koichi Kanshuu: Keirin-Ou
- Sprinter Monogatari: Mezase!! Ikkaku Senkin
- Ippatsu Gyakuten: Keiba Keirin Kyōtei
