= Cyber Doll =

1996 video game

- Developer: Betop
- Publisher: I'Max
- Platform: Saturn
- Release: JP: August 9, 1996
- Genre: RPG
- Mode: Single-player

Cyber Doll (Note: Japanese: サイバードール, Hepburn: Saibādōru) is role-playing video game released for the Sega Saturn by I'MAX in 1996.

Hiroyuki Kotani was its co-producer.

== Reception ==
The Chinese Game Players magazine and Rokuyon highlighted the game's battle system.

The Sega Saturn Magazine (Japan) review staff gave the game a combined 6.33/10 rating, while Saturn Fan rated it 6.4/10.
