= Sundai Ireland International School =

Japanese international school in Newbridge, Kildare, Ireland

- 駿台アイルランド国際学校

Location
- Curragh Grange, Green Road, Newbridge, County Kildare, Ireland; Newbridge; Ireland
- Coordinates: 53.159364°N 6.809015°W

Information
- Type: Private high school
- Website: home.att.ne.jp/sun/kseo/index-sundai-irl.htm

Sundai Ireland International School (駿台アイルランド国際学校 Sundai Airurando Kokusai Gakkō) was a Japanese international school in Newbridge, County Kildare, Ireland. It served junior high school and senior high school students, who had Japanese expatriate parents. The school was in operation in the 1990s. This school was an overseas branch of a Japanese private school, or a Shiritsu zaigai kyōiku shisetsu (私立在外教育施設).

Curragh Grange was the main building, and it featured the Lafcadio Hearn Library. Kildare House (キルデア・ハウス Kirudea Hausu) served as a classroom building. The campus also featured dormitory and dining facilities.

The school closed in March 2003, and Gaelscoil Chill Dara moved into its classroom building. The dormitory building was intended to be converted to a school for special needs children, however it was found to be unsuitable for this purpose. It laid vacant for six years until September 2009, when Newbridge Educate Together began occupying the property. The dining hall building lay vacant for seven years until mid 2010, when Gaelscoil Chill Dara repurposed it to provide additional classrooms to the school.

== See also ==
- Sundai Preparatory School
- Sundai Michigan International Academy
