= Sundai Preparatory School =

Preparatory school in Japan

Coordinates: 35.6904°N 140.0186°E

- 駿台予備学校

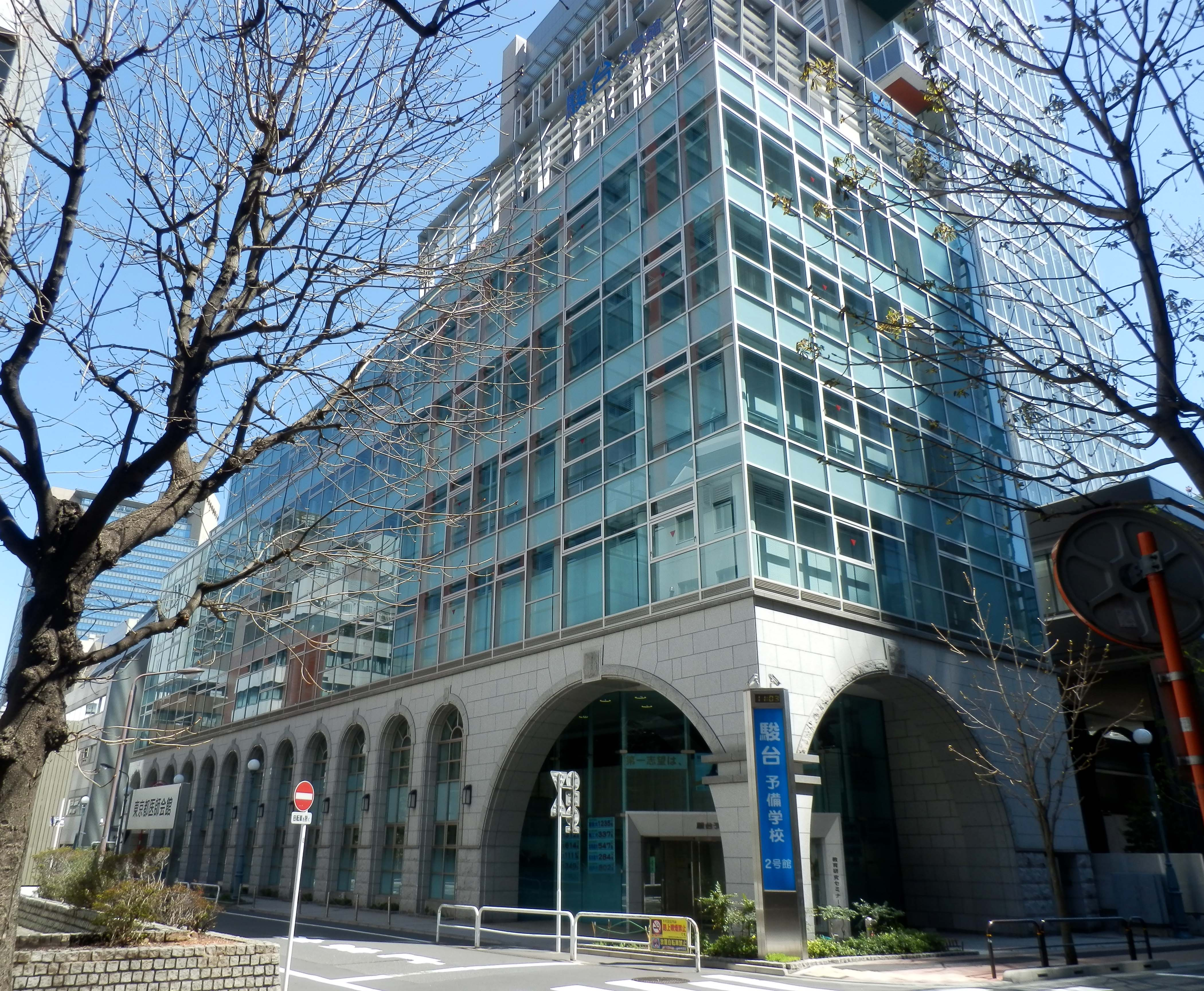
- 2nd Building
- Ochanomizu, Tokyo Japan

Information
- Type: Preparatory School
- Motto: 第一志望は、ゆずれない。
- Established: 1918
- Principal: Naoko Yamazaki
- Grades: Grade 6 - Grade 12
- Website: www2.sundai.ac.jp

Sundai Preparatory School (駿台予備学校, Sundai Yobigakkō) is the oldest extracurricular college-preparatory school in Japan. It was founded in 1918 by Toshiharu Yamazaki (山崎 寿春 Yamazaki Toshiharu), a Japanese English Literature scholar and a graduate of Amherst College, Harvard College, and Yale University (Graduate School). Along with Kawai-juku and Yoyogi Seminar, it is one of the three largest groups of preparatory schools. Sundai Preparatory School is regularly ranked as first by the number of acceptances to the University of Tokyo and Kyoto University, both considered the most competitive universities in Japan. Admission is competitive, and students must receive satisfactory grades in national examinations to enroll.

== Campuses ==
=== Sundai Preparatory School ===
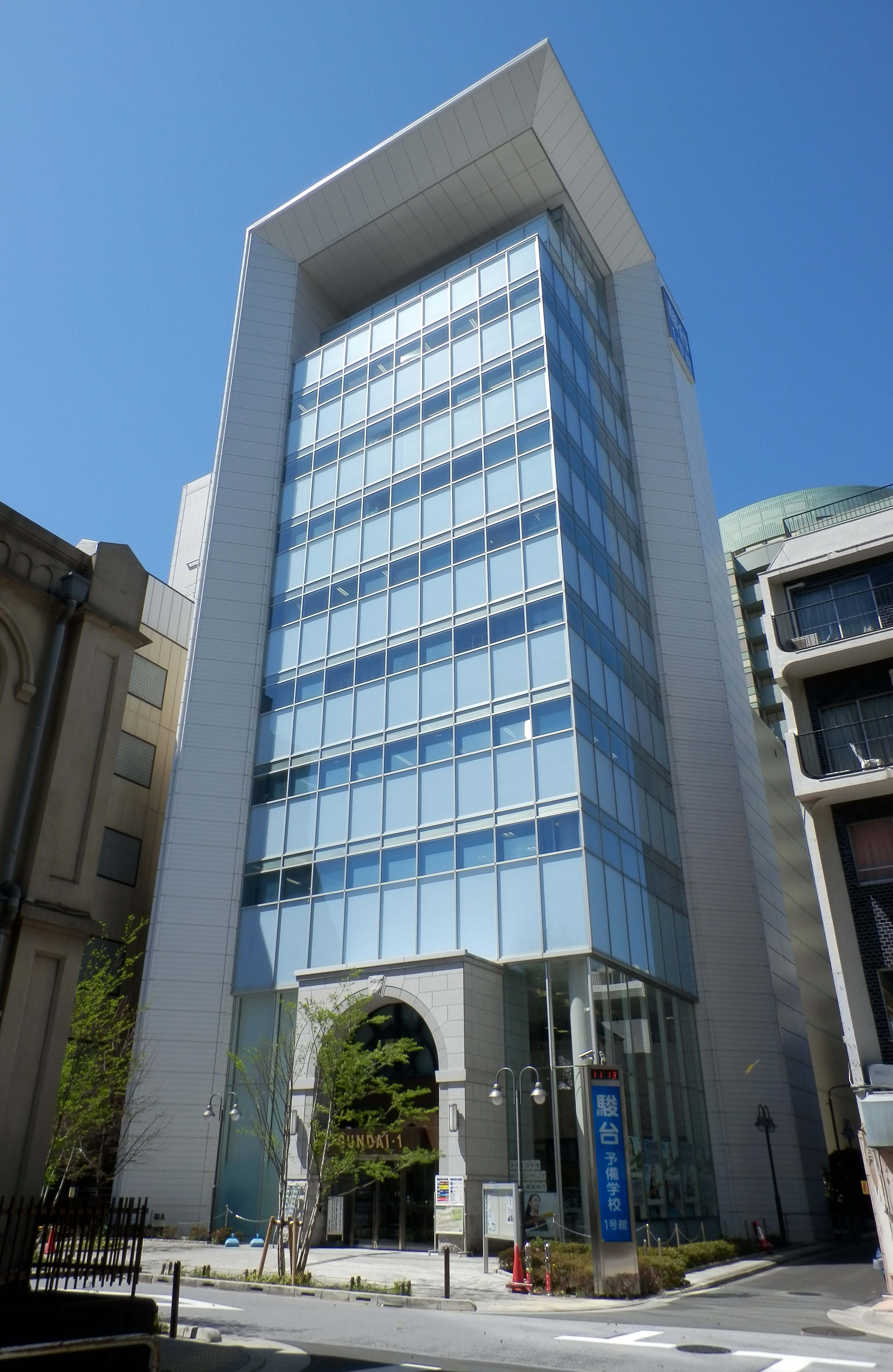
1st Building

Tsudanuma

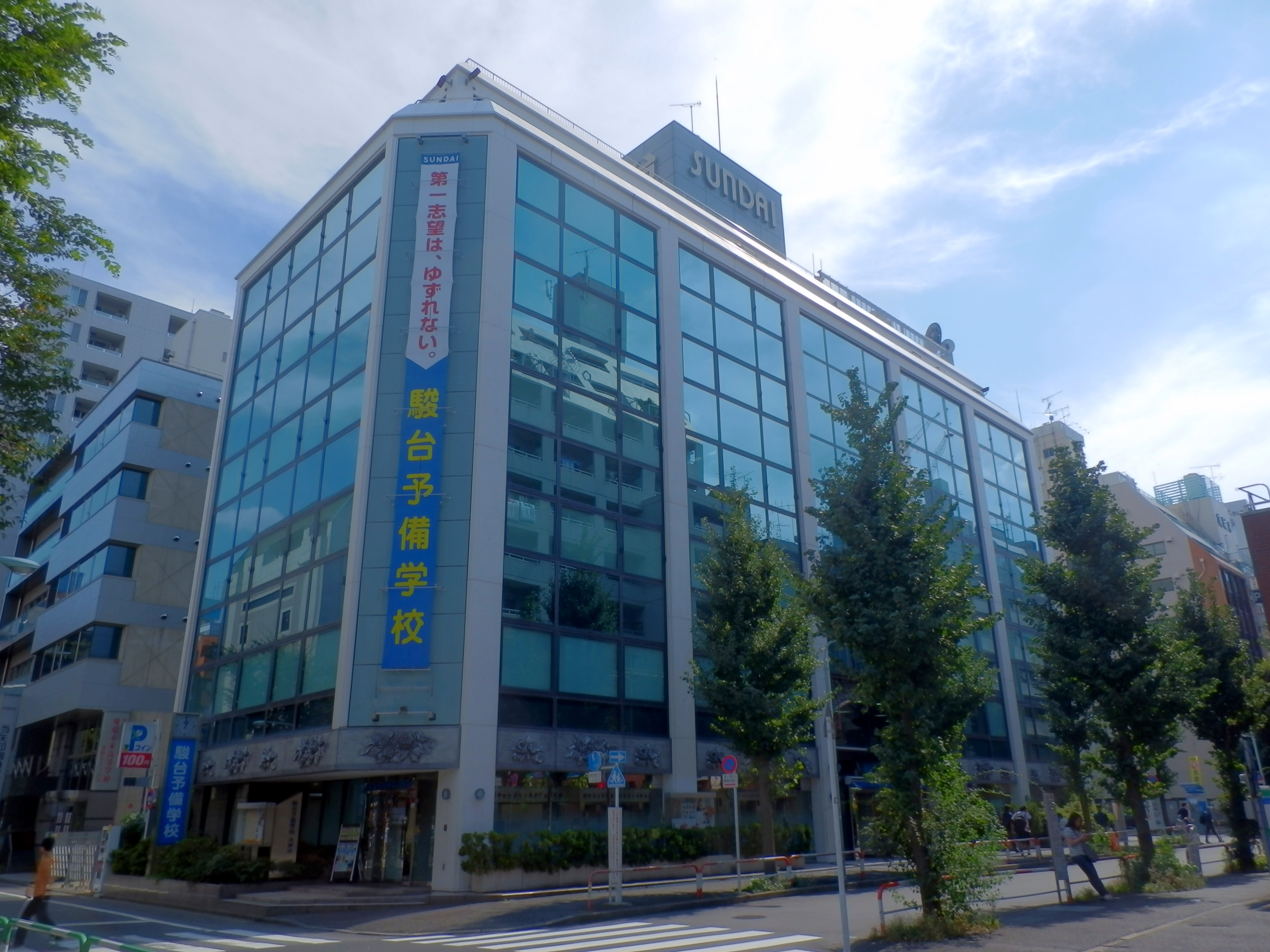
Ikebukuro

- Headquarters (Ochanomizu, Tokyo)
  - 1st building
  - 2nd building
  - 3rd building
  - 8th building
- Kyoto
- Osaka
- Nagoya
- Yokohama
- Sapporo
- Fukuoka
- Kobe
- Hamamatsu
- Sendai
- Hiroshima

=== Sundai Center for International Education ===
- Singapore
- Malaysia
- Bangkok
- Jakarta
- Hongkong
- Shanghai
- Pudong
- Taipei
- Myanmar
- Tokyo
- New York
- New Jersey
- Michigan
- Düsseldorf

== Departments ==
These subjects are all required by top-tier universities in Japan.

- English
- Mathematics
- Contemporary Japanese
- Classical Japanese language
- Classical Chinese
- Physics
- Chemistry
- Biology
- Geoscience
- History of Japan
- World history
- Geography
- Civics

== Affiliated institutions ==
- Sundai Michigan International Academy
- Sundai Ireland International School (closed)
- Surugadai University
