= Omotesandō =

Avenue in Tokyo

Coordinates: 35°39′54″N 139°42′45″E

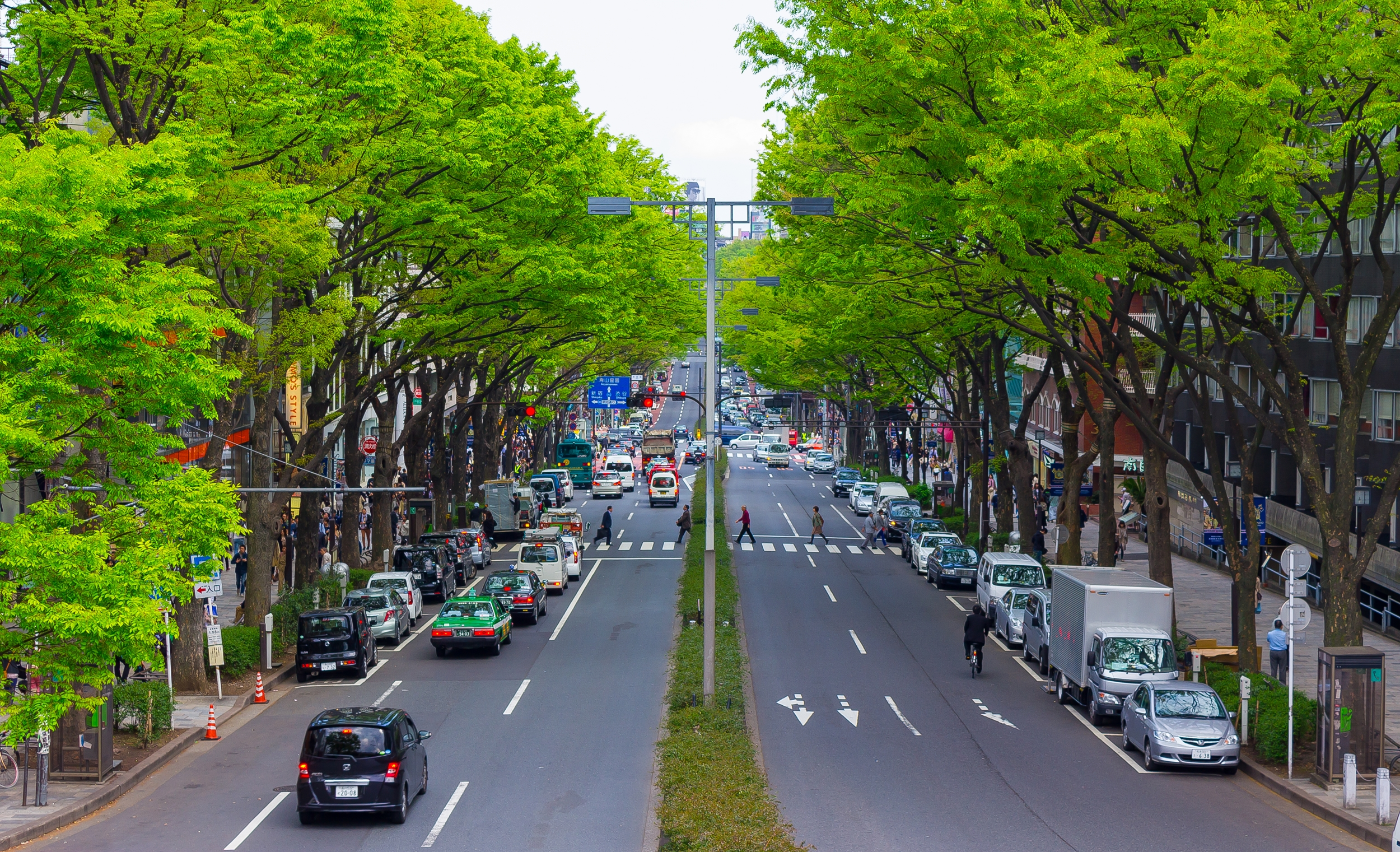
Omotesandō street as seen from an overpass

Omotesandō (表参道) is a zelkova tree-lined avenue located in Shibuya and Minato, Tokyo, stretching from the Meiji Shrine entrance to Aoyama-dōri (Aoyama Street), where Omotesandō Station can be found.

== History ==
Omotesandō was originally created in the Taishō era (1912–1926) as the frontal (表, Omote) approach (参道, Sandō) to Meiji Shrine, which is dedicated to the deified spirits of Emperor Meiji and his wife, Empress Shōken.

== Present ==
Omotesandō is known as one of the foremost 'architectural showcase' streets in the world, featuring a multitude of fashion flagship stores within a short distance of each other. These include the Louis Vuitton store (Jun Aoki, 2002), Tod's (Toyo Ito, 2004), Dior (SANAA, 2004), Omotesandō Hills (Tadao Ando, 2005) and Gyre (MVRDV, 2007), amongst others.

Omotesandō is the main vehicle and pedestrian thoroughfare for Harajuku and Aoyama. The area features many international brand boutiques, such as Louis Vuitton, Alexander McQueen and Gucci, as well as fast fashion retailers such as Gap, Evisu, H&M and Zara. In his book Luxury Brand Management, luxury brand manager Michel Chevalier cites Omotesandō as one of the best locations in Tokyo for a luxury goods store. Omotesandō is also home to the Kiddyland toy store, Laforet, and the Oriental Bazaar. Omotesandō's side streets, known as Ura-Harajuku, feature a range of smaller cafes, bars, restaurants, and boutique stores.

Omotesandō is the venue for Tokyo's annual Saint Patrick's Day Parade.

== Gallery ==
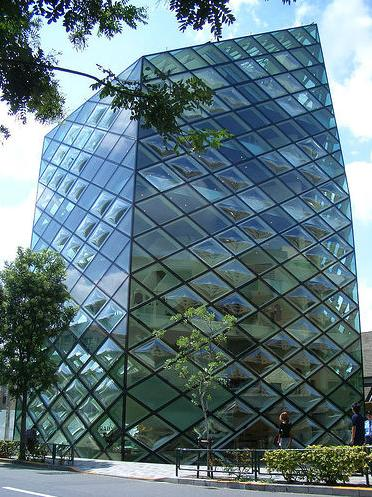
Prada Aoyama

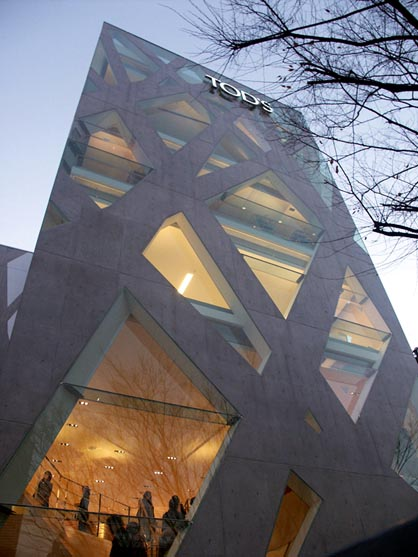
Tod's Omotesandō building

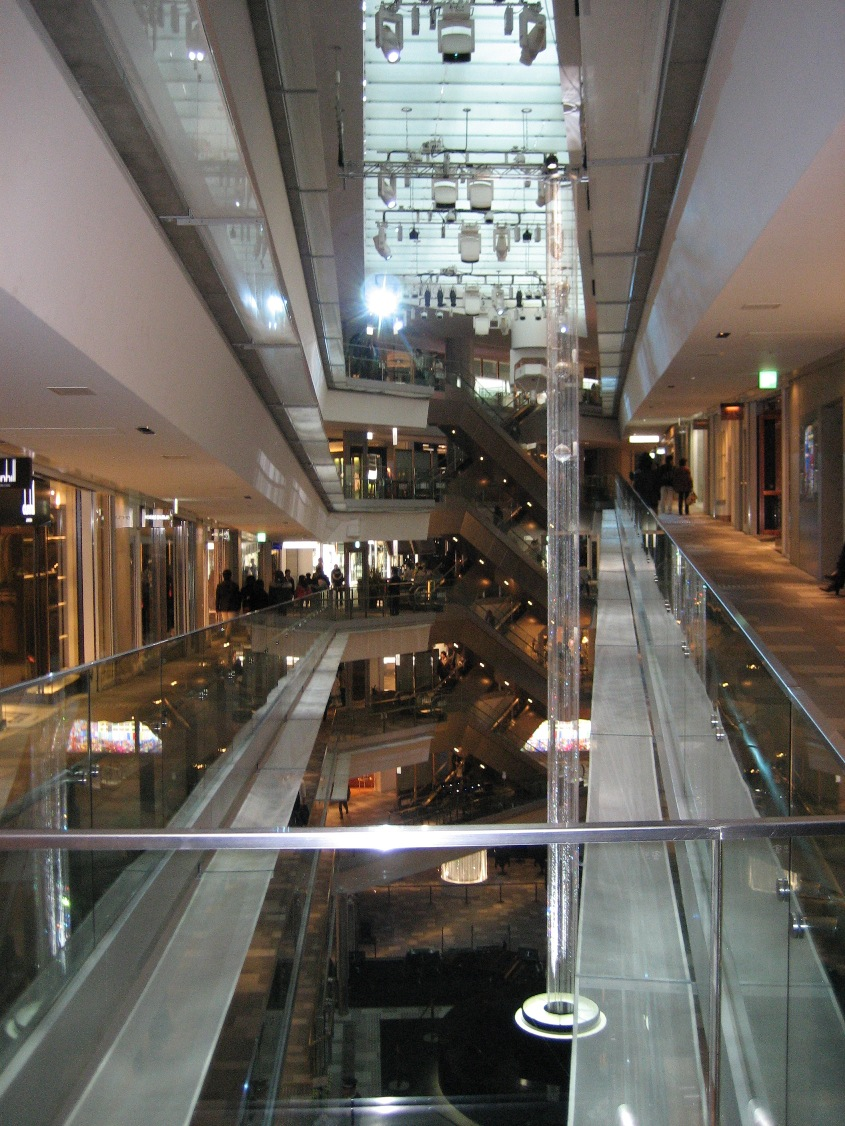
Omotesando Hills

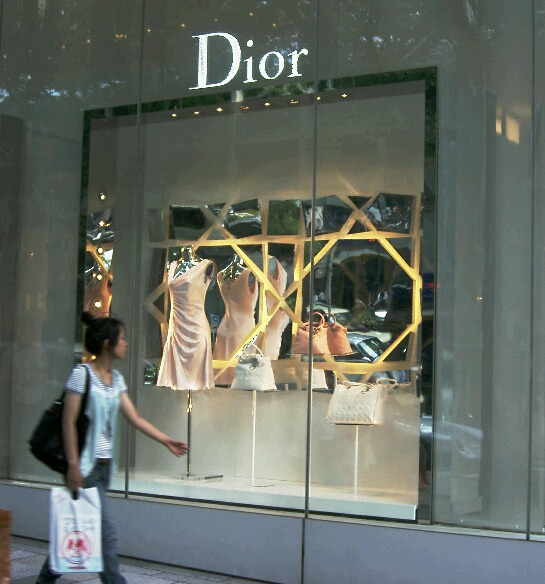
Dior Omotesandō

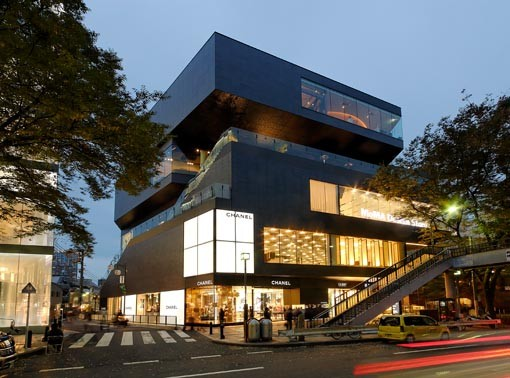
Designer retail complex "The Gyre"
