= Hiroyuki Kotani =

Japanese video game designer

Hiroyuki Kotani (Japanese: 小谷浩之, Hepburn: Kotani Hiroyuki) is a Japanese video game designer known for creating the Patapon series.

Hiroyuki Kotani is developing a spiritual successor to the Patapon series called Ratatan. His new studio Ratata Arts announced the new game and at BitSummit 2023 and ran a successful Kickstarter campaign the same year.

== Works ==
- Dual Orb II (1994)
- Cyber Doll (1996)
- Wonder Trek (1998)
- Ape Escape Academy (2004)
- Patapon (2007)
- Ratatan (2026)
