= Ochanomizu =

Neighborhood in Tokyo, Japan

Ochanomizu 御茶ノ水
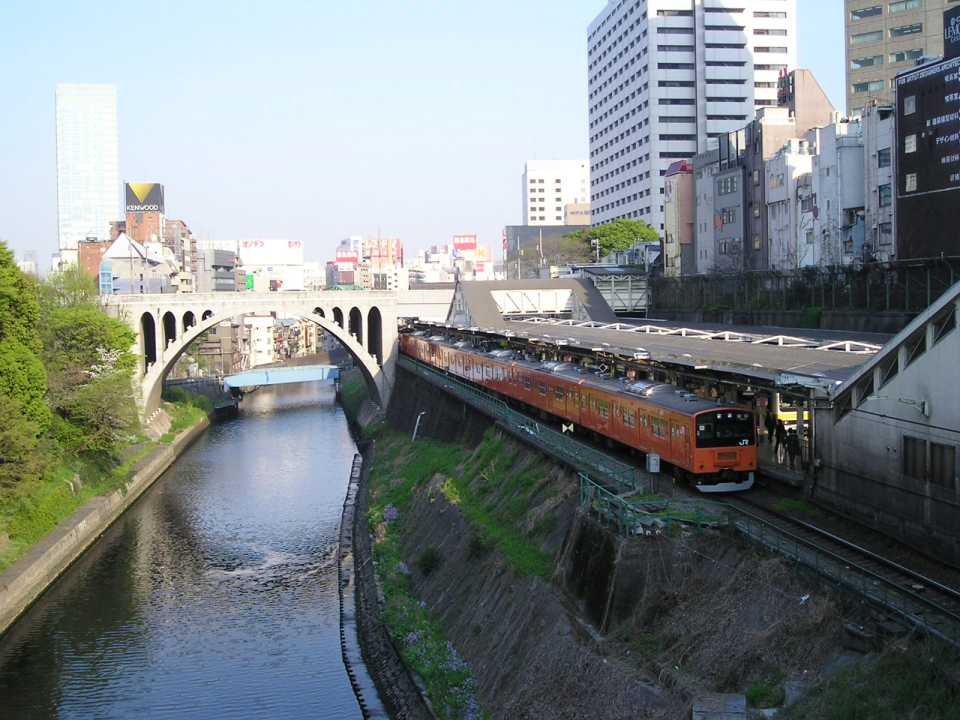
- Ochanomizu Station

- Location in Tokyo Location in Japan
- Coordinates: 35°41′54″N 139°45′51″E

Area
  - Land: 61.0 ha (151 acres)
- Time zone: UTC+9 (JST)

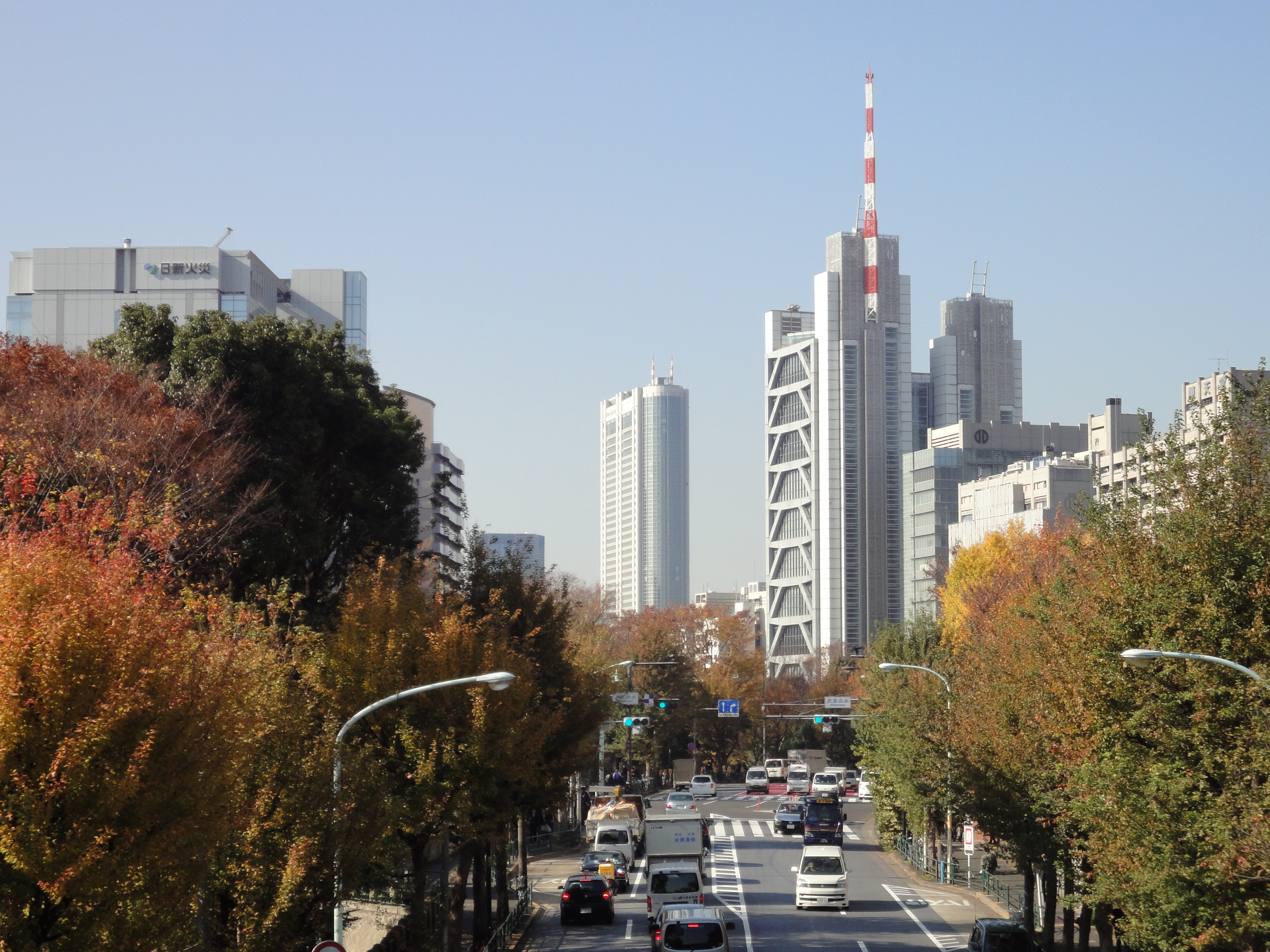
Ochanomizu

Ochanomizu (御茶ノ水) is a neighborhood in Tokyo, Japan. It extends from the Yushima section of Bunkyo-ku to the Kanda section of Chiyoda-ku. Sundai Preparatory School, Meiji University, Tokyo Medical and Dental University, and Juntendo University all have main campuses in the area. Ochanomizu Station on the Chūō Line is the transport hub of the district. Prior to the Great Kantō earthquake, Ochanomizu University was also there; after the earthquake, it moved to its present location in the Ōtsuka neighborhood of Bunkyo-ku. Ochanomizu is also the location of the Holy Resurrection Cathedral (Nikorai-dō).

Ochanomizu is famous for its many musical instrument stores, as well as ski and snowboard shops located a short walk from the station; it is a popular district for bargain-conscious musicians and sportsmen.

Ocha-no-mizu literally means "tea water", after the nearby Kanda River from which water was extracted to make the shōgun's tea during the Edo period.
