= Keikyu N1000 series =

Japanese electric multiple unit train type

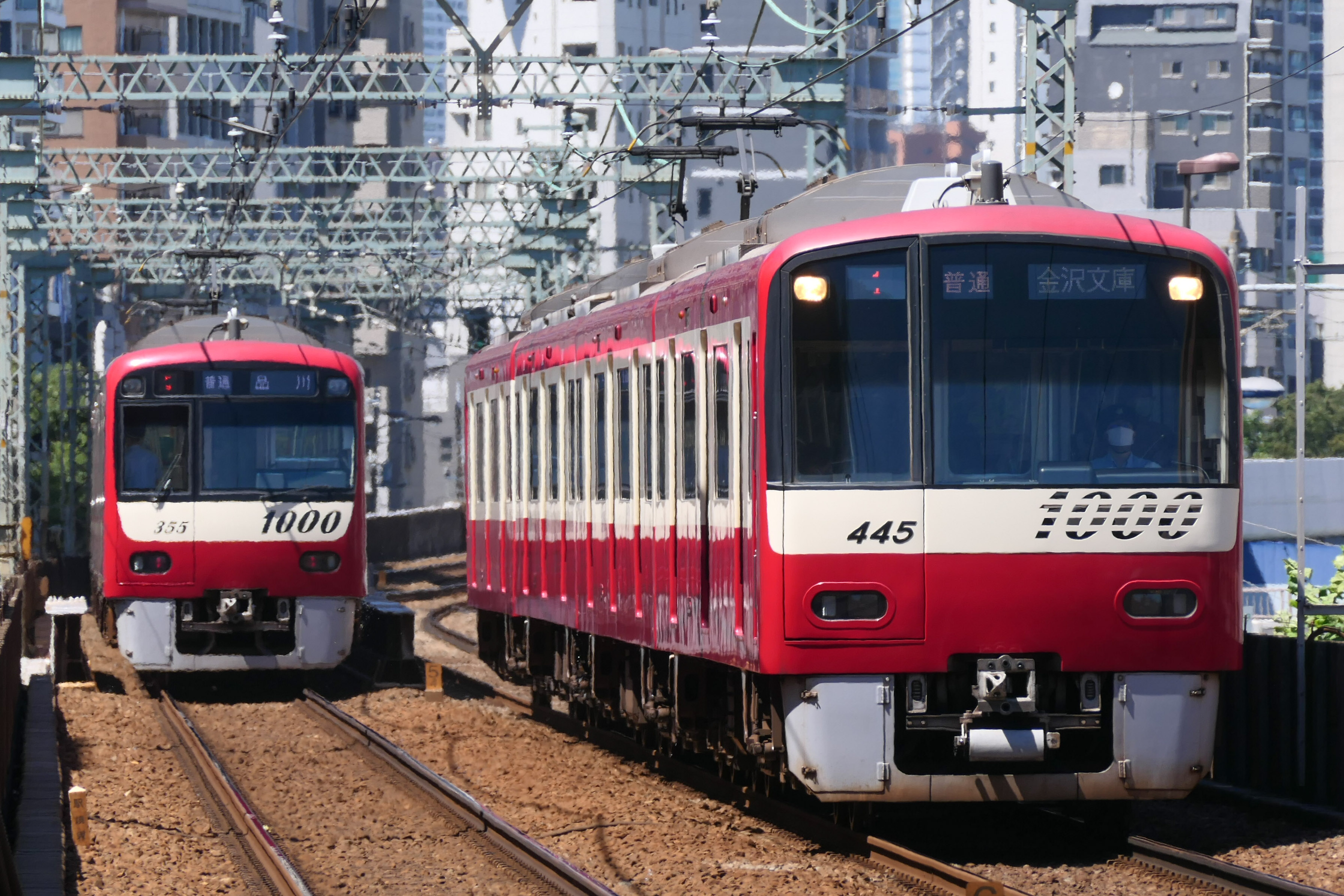
- Stainless steel (left) and aluminium (right) N1000 series sets in July 2021
- In service: 15 April 2002 – present
- Manufacturers: Tokyu Car Corporation; J-TREC; Kawasaki Heavy Industries; Kawasaki Railcar Manufacturing
- Replaced: 800 series; 1000 series; 1500 series
- Constructed: 2002–
- Number under construction: 32 vehicles (9 sets)
- Number built: 514 vehicles (86 sets)
- Number in service: 490 vehicles (83 sets) as of September 2023
- Number scrapped: 8 vehicles (1 set; accident damage)
- Formation: 2/4/6/8 cars per trainset
- Operator: Keikyu
- Lines served: Keikyu Main Line; Keikyu Airport Line; Keikyu Daishi Line; Keikyu Kurihama Line; Keikyu Zushi Line; Toei Asakusa Line; Keisei Main Line; Keisei Oshiage Line; Narita Sky Access Line; Hokuso Line

Specifications
- Car body construction: Aluminium (batches 1–5); Stainless steel (batches 6 onward)
- Car length: 18,000 mm (59 ft 1 in)
- Width: 2,830 mm (9 ft 3 in)
- Floor height: 1,150 mm (45 in)
- Doors: 3 pairs per side
- Maximum speed: Service: 120 km/h (75 mph); Design: 130 km/h (81 mph)
- Traction system: Variable frequency (GTO/IGBT/MOSFET)
- Traction motors: 3-phase AC induction motor or permanent-magnet synchronous motor
- Acceleration: 3.5 km/(h⋅s) (2.2 mph/s)
- Deceleration: Service: 4.0 km/(h⋅s) (2.5 mph/s); Emergency: 4.5 km/(h⋅s) (2.8 mph/s)
- Electric systems: Overhead line, 1,500 V DC
- Current collection: Pantograph
- Braking system: Electronically controlled pneumatic brakes with regenerative braking
- Safety system: C-ATS
- Multiple working: 600 series; 1500 series; 2100 series
- Track gauge: 1,435 mm (4 ft 8 1/2 in)

Notes/references
- This train won the 65th Blue Ribbon Award in 2022. ※ Awarded for 1000-1890 series "Le Ciel"

The Keikyu N1000 series (京急新1000形, Keikyū Shin-1000-gata) is a DC electric multiple unit (EMU) train type operated by the private railway operator Keikyu on commuter services in the Tokyo area of Japan since 2002.

== Overview ==
The N1000 series fleet first entered revenue service on 15 April 2002 as a successor to all remaining original 1000 series sets. The type garnered its designation as New 1000 series, frequently shortened to N1000 series, to distinguish it from the original 1000 series, which remained in service until 2010. Since then, "1000 series" has seen increasing use to refer to the N1000 series.

The N1000 series is Keikyu's most numerous train type, with 506 vehicles having been built as of April 2024, surpassing Keikyu's next-most numerous train type, the original 1000 series, by 150 vehicles. In March 2022, the type comprised approximately 60% of Keikyu's nearly 800-vehicle fleet.

== Operations ==
The eight-car sets are primarily used on limited-stop "Rapid Limited Express" and "Limited Express" services on the Keikyu Main Line, including through-running services to the Toei Asakusa Line as well as the Keisei Oshiage Line, Keisei Main Line, Narita Sky Access Line, and Hokuso Line. Some of these eight-car sets are also used on the Keikyu Airport Line. Four-car sets are commonly used to form 12-car "Rapid Limited Express" and "Limited Express" services, and are also used singly on all-stations "Local" services, with occasional use on the Keikyu Daishi Line. The six-car formations delivered from 2011 are generally used on all-stations "Local" services. The N1000 series sets can be used in multiple with other Keikyu EMU types, including the 600 series, 1500 series, 2000 series, and 2100 series.

== Variants ==
Since the first set was introduced in 2002, the type has undergone a number of design improvements. Sets built from 2002 to 2006 have painted aluminium bodies, whereas sets built from 2007 onward (sets 1073 onward) have stainless steel bodies. More detailed variations are described below.

=== Batches 1–5 ===
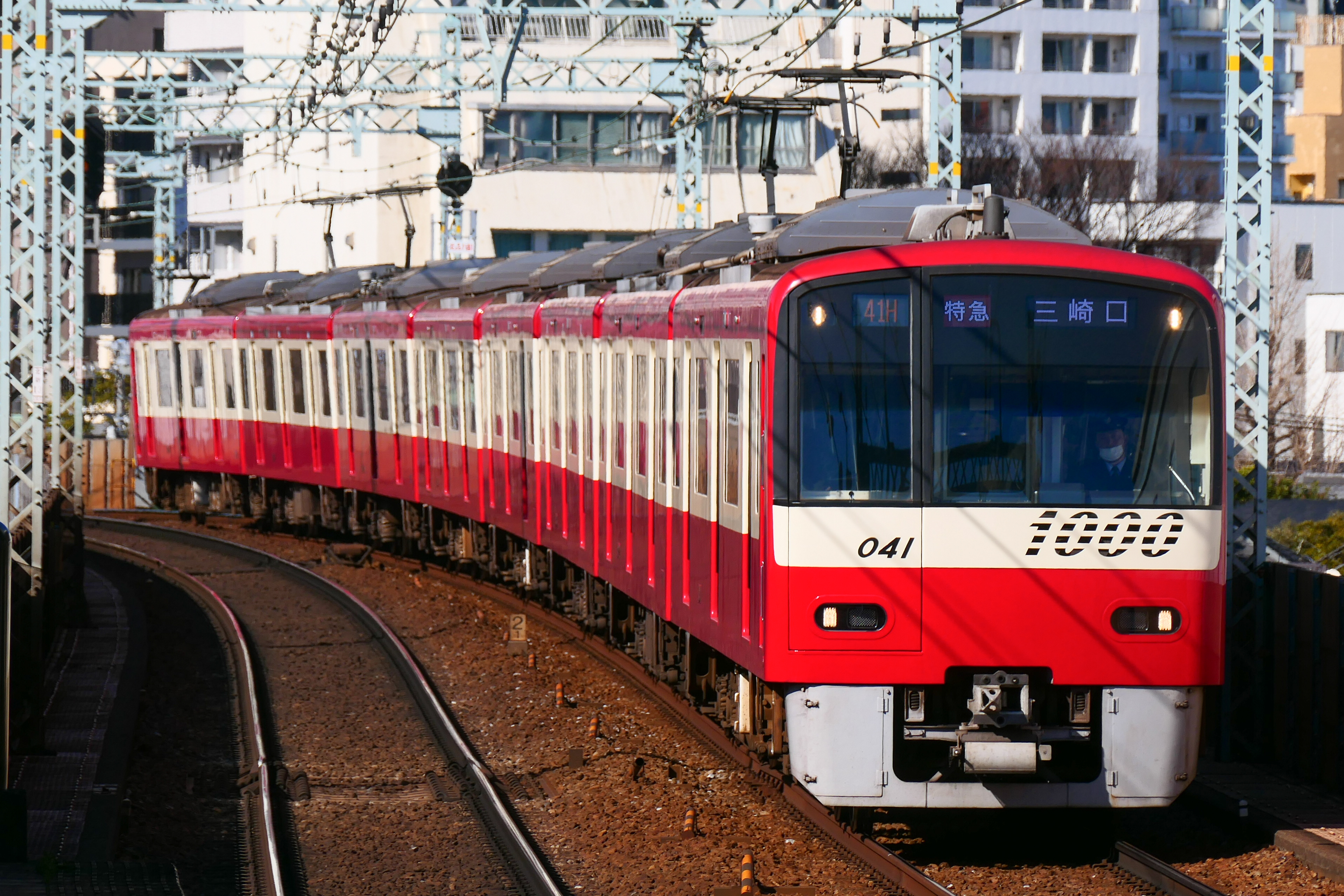
3rd-batch 8-car set 1041 in February 2023

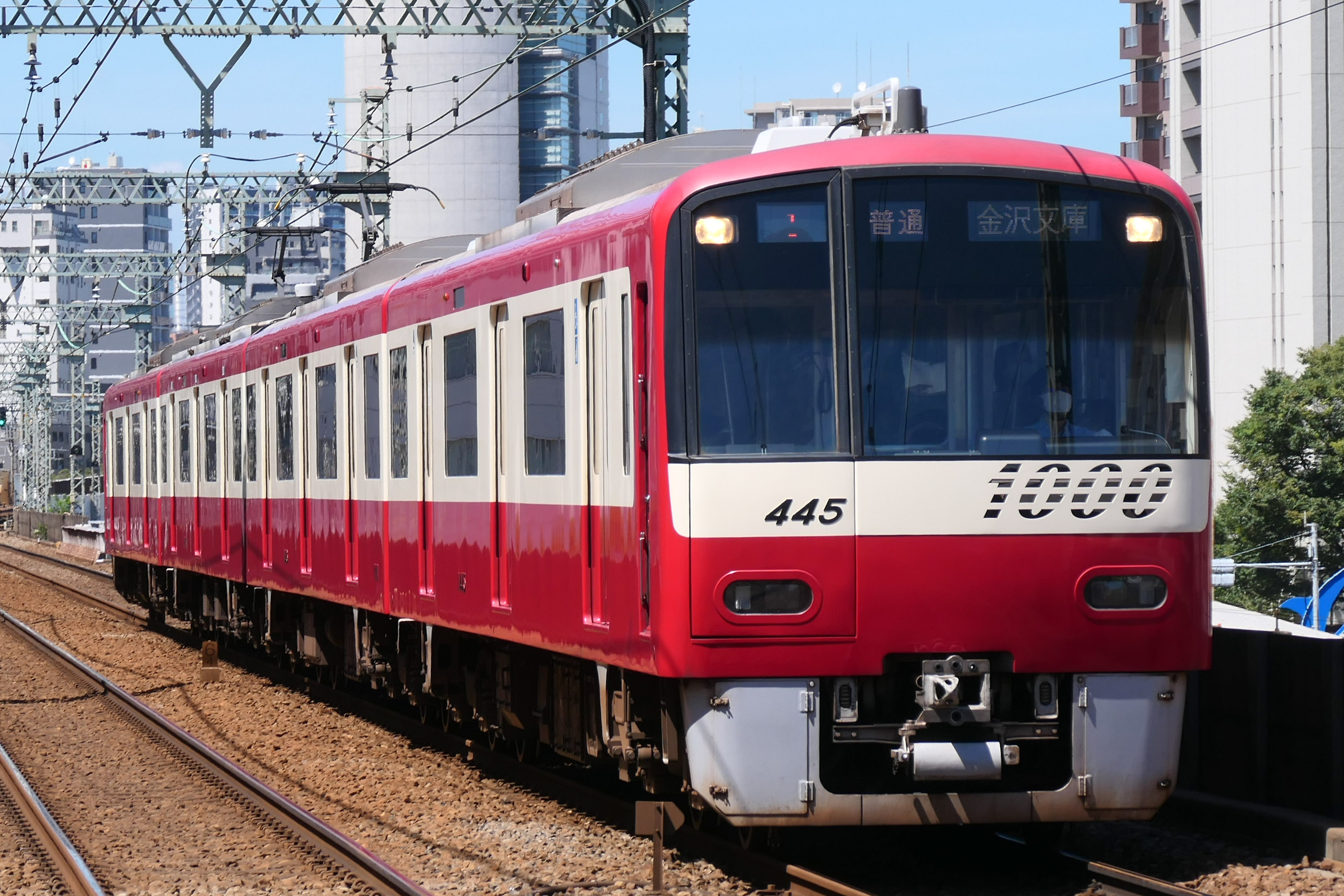
5th-batch 4-car set 1445 in July 2021

These are four- and eight-car sets manufactured by Tokyu Car Corporation and Kawasaki Heavy Industries between 2002 and 2006.

==== Design ====
Largely based on the design of the 2100 series, the N1000 series trains incorporate several differences due to the services on which they are used. These include the use of three passenger doors per side per car (as opposed to the 2100 series' two), and a commuter-oriented interior configuration.

A second batch of N1000 series sets was introduced from mid-2003, consisting of eight-car sets 1025 and 1033, and four-car sets 1409 and 1413. With the first batch of sets, four- and eight-car sets could be rearranged to form six-car trains, but this possibility was removed with this batch's four-car sets. The four-car sets also featured minor technical changes, with pantographs and power supplies being consolidated to the third car; in contrast, the first batch's four-car sets were fitted with a pantograph and power supply for each intermediate car.

Batch 3 (eight-car sets 1041 and 1049 and four-car sets 1417 and 1421), delivered in early 2005, was built with a motor car-to-trailer car ratio of 3:1 (compared to 1:1 for older sets), as well as other modifications for updated fire regulation compliance and weight reduction. Batches 4 (eight-car set 1057 and four-car sets 1425–1437) and 5 (eight-car set 1065 and four-car sets 1441 and 1445) were built with full-colour LED destination displays in place of the original roller-blind displays.

==== Interior ====
The interior incorporates a warm colour palette. Passenger accommodation consists primarily of longitudinal bucket-style seating, with transverse seating bays at car ends. Priority seating is also provided. When compared to the original 1000 series fleet, the N1000 series sets feature several accessibility improvements, such as audible door warnings, onboard passenger information displays, wheelchair spaces, and anti-slip flooring.

Beginning in 2010, priority seats were given blue moquette.

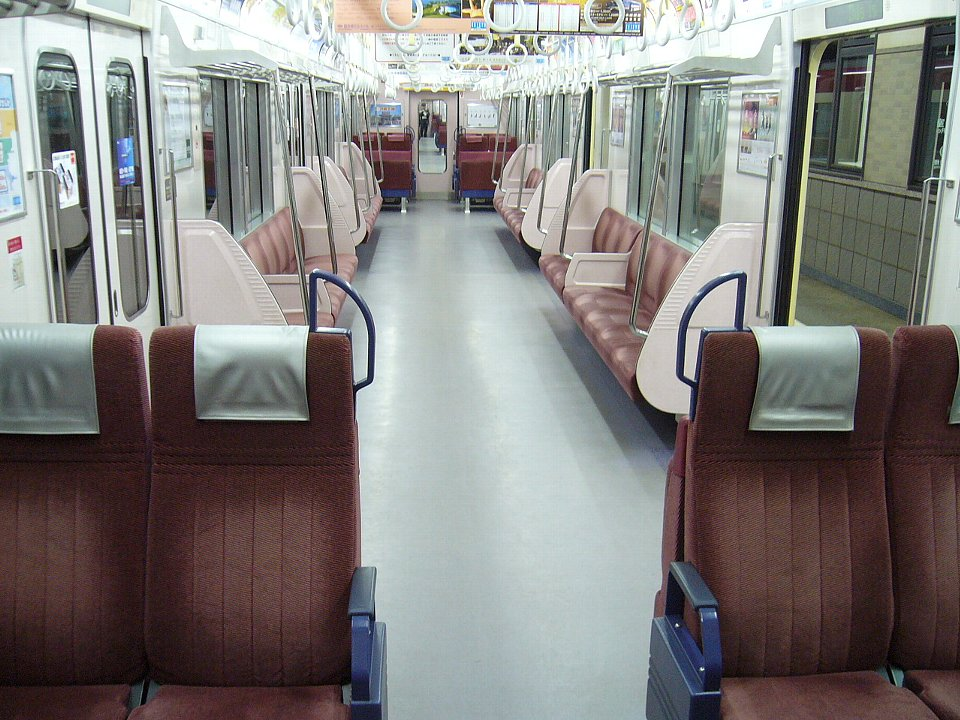
Interior in as-built condition

==== Specifications ====
The first two N1000 series batches were fitted with Siemens SIBAS32 GTO thyristor-based variable-voltage/variable-frequency (VVVF) propulsion systems, like the preceding 2100 series fleet. These systems garnered the nickname "Do-re-mi-fa Inverter" (ドレミファインバータ) due to the distinctive ascending musical scale they produced when accelerating from a standstill. Keikyu began replacing these traction systems in 2010 with systems from domestic suppliers. Eight-car set 1033 was the last set operating with these traction systems, making its final run with its original equipment on 20 July 2021.

Batches 3–5 were fitted with IGBT (insulated-gate bipolar transistor)-based traction systems, also supplied by Siemens. These traction systems' control units were lighter and smaller than those used in earlier sets. Batch 3 also introduced lighter TH-2100BM/TH-2100BT bogies, which lacked amenities from the original TH-2100AM/TH-2100AT design such as sandboxes and yaw dampers.

==== Build histories ====
8-car sets
Set No.	Manufacturer	Date delivered	Batch
1001	Tokyu Car	23 February 2002	1
1009	Tokyu Car	28 June 2002	1
1017	Kawasaki HI	31 May 2002	1
1025	Tokyu Car	19 May 2003	2
1033	Kawasaki HI	24 June 2003	2
1041	Tokyu Car	19 January 2005	3
1049	Kawasaki HI	1 March 2005	3
1057	Tokyu Car	30 August 2005	4
1065	Tokyu Car	30 October 2006	5

4-car sets
Set No.	Manufacturer	Date delivered	Batch
1401	Kawasaki HI	29 June 2002	1
1405	Kawasaki HI	29 June 2002	1
1409	Tokyu Car	3 July 2003	2
1413	Kawasaki HI	3 July 2003	2
1417	Tokyu Car	11 March 2005	3
1421	Kawaski HI	11 March 2005	3
1425	Tokyu Car	26 July 2005	4
1429	Kawasaki HI	26 July 2005	4
1433	Kawasaki HI	9 August 2005	4
1437	Kawasaki HI	9 August 2005	4
1441	Kawasaki HI	14 November 2006	5
1445	Kawasaki HI	14 November 2006	5

=== Batches 6–15 ===
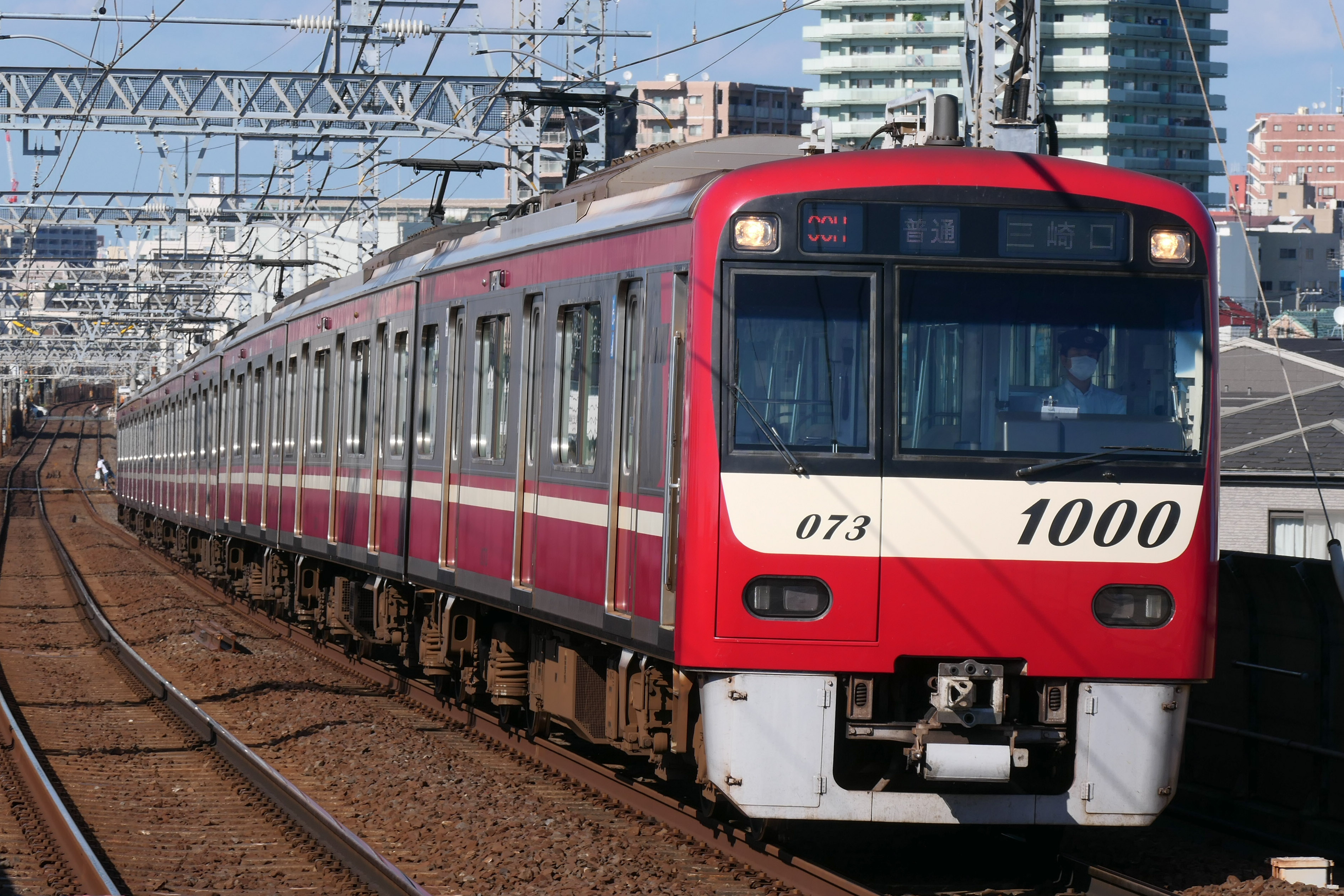
6th-batch 8-car set 1073 in July 2021

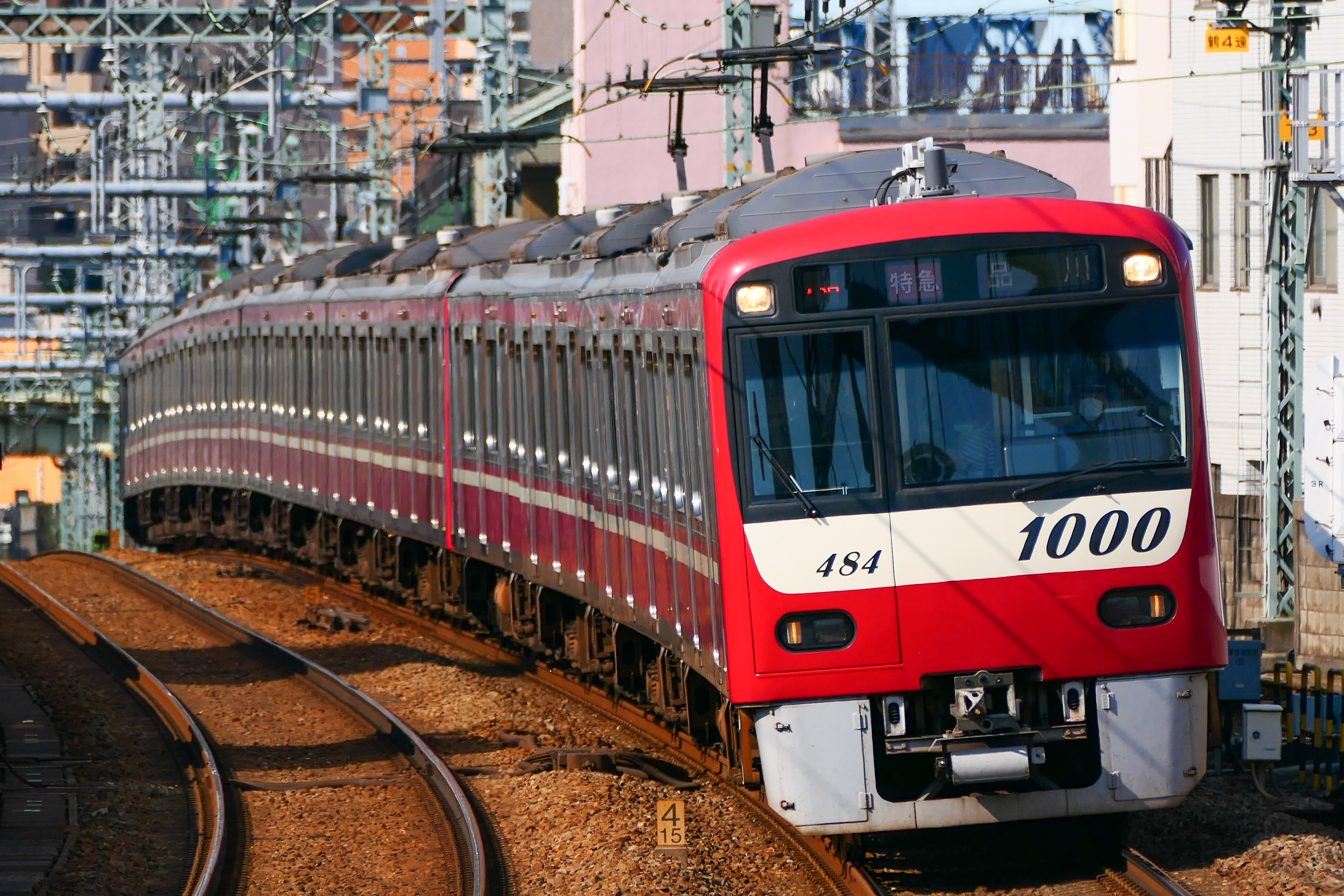
9th-batch 4-car set 1481 in July 2023

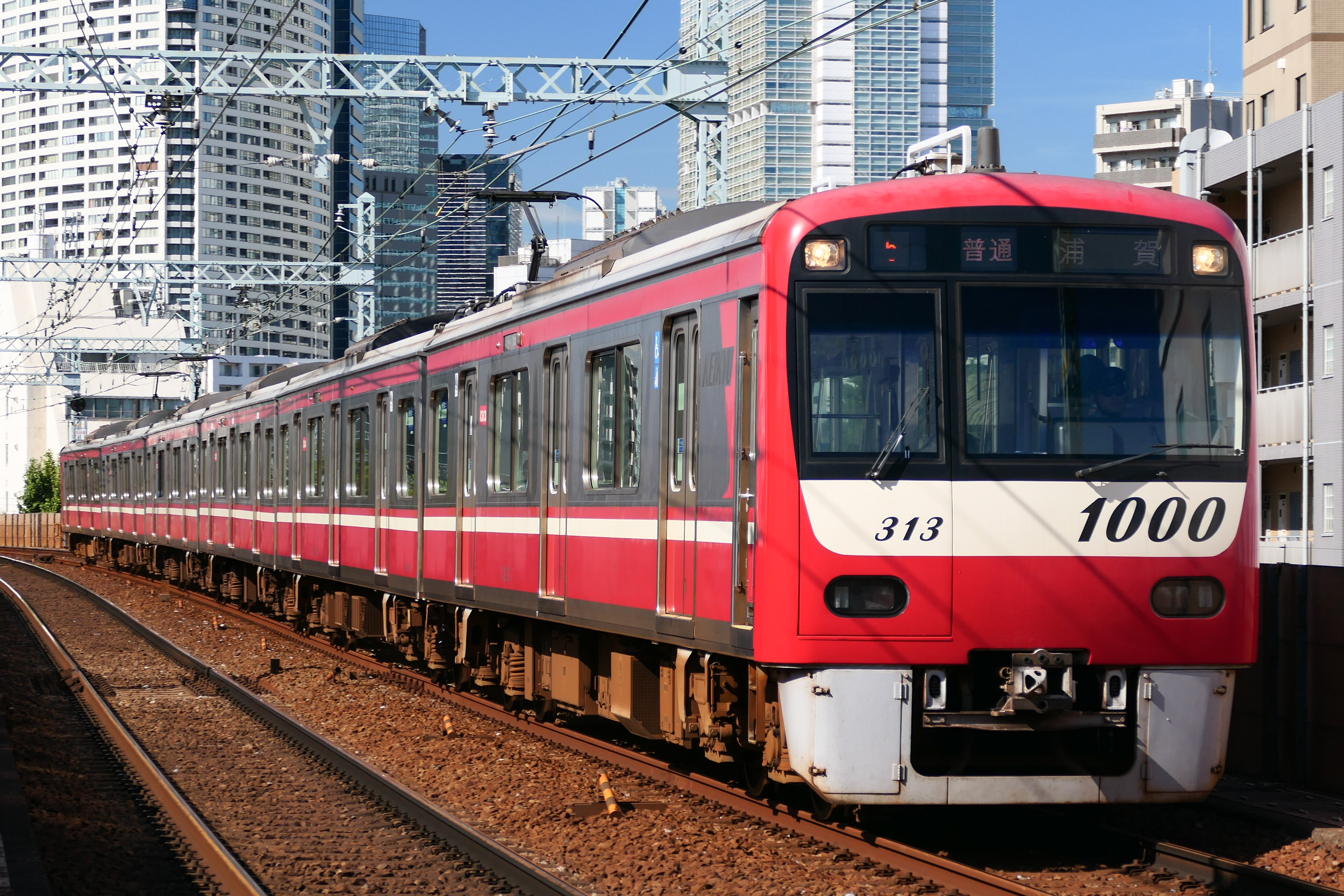
11th-batch 6-car set 1313 in September 2023

These are four-, six-, and eight-car sets manufactured by Tokyu Car Corporation (J-TREC from 2012) and Kawasaki Heavy Industries between 2007 and 2015.

==== External and technical changes ====
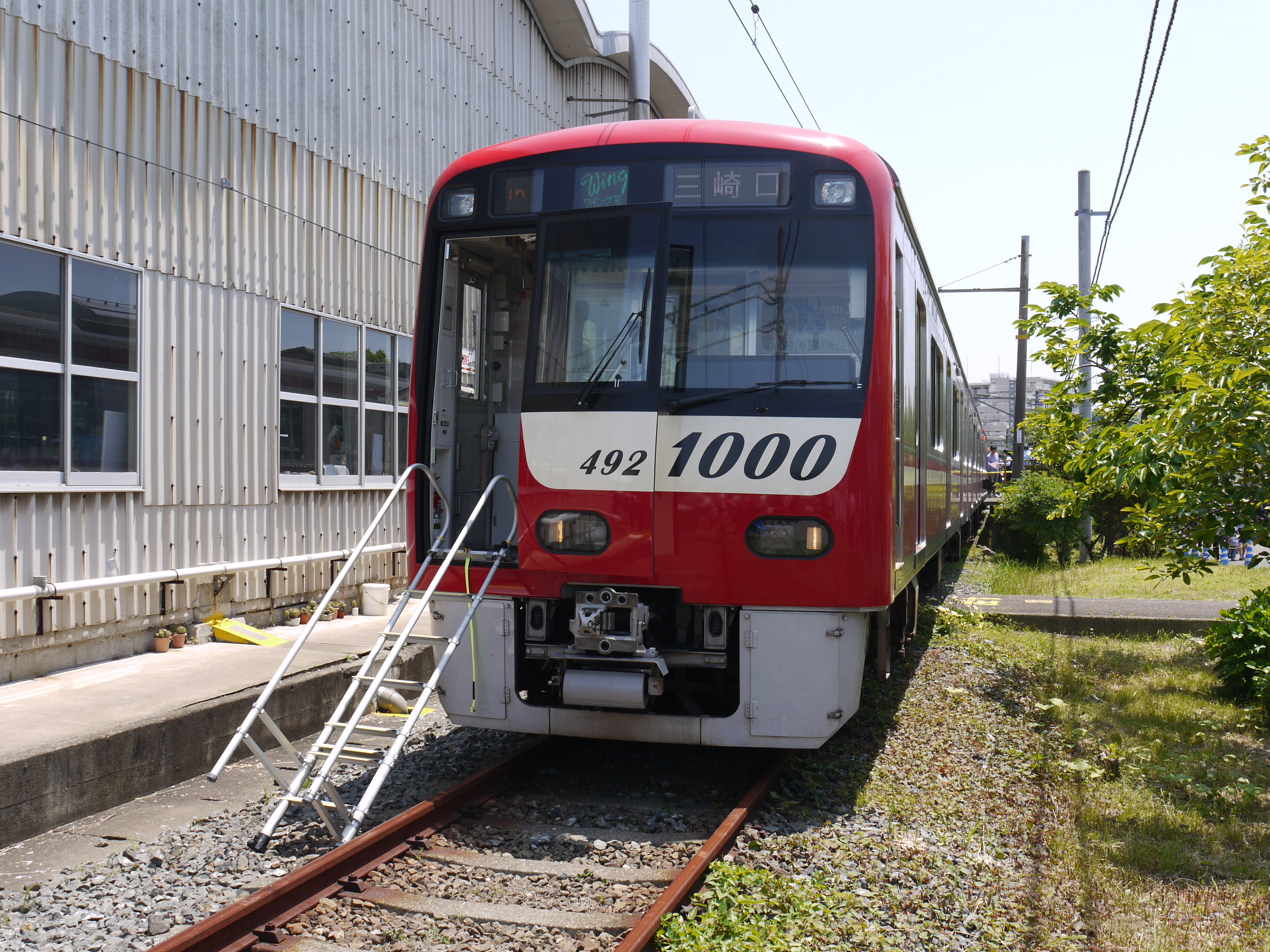
Opened front-end emergency exit

These sets were built with significant bodywork and system updates over previous batches, some of which would be firsts for the N1000 series and Keikyu's history. These changes include the use of stainless steel bodies with film wrapping used for body colouring (earlier sets used painted aluminium); the discontinuation of front-end wiper covers; and domestically supplied traction systems from Mitsubishi, Toyo Denki, and Toshiba. The new bodies are approximately 40 millimetres (2 in) narrower than their aluminium-bodied counterparts. Four-car sets were built with motor cars throughout whilst eight-car sets preserved the motor car-to-trailer car ratio of 3:1.

Batch 10 introduced improved front-end emergency exits and onboard train management systems.

The sets have garnered the nickname Ginsen (銀千, lit. 'silver thousand') for their red and silver colouring.

==== Internal changes ====
From batch 6, the transverse seat bays at the ends of cars were replaced with longitudinal bench seats, the seat partitions were recoloured beige, and the driver's position was raised by 150 mm (6 in). Batch 7 introduced yellow warning tape around the door interiors; batch 10 introduced visual door warnings and LCD information displays; and batch 11 introduced internal LED lighting (set 1313 only), following trials with older trainsets from December 2009.

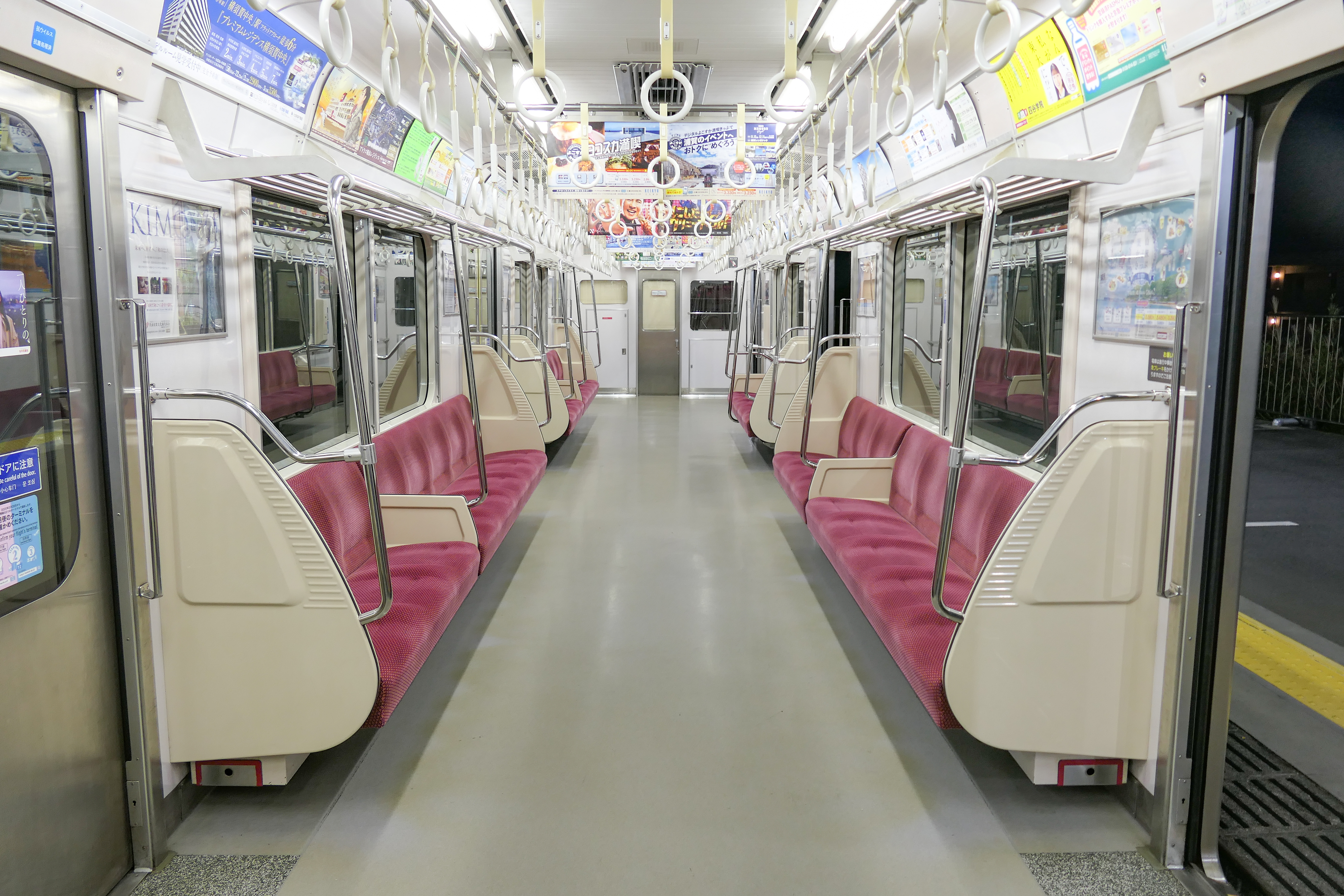
Interior

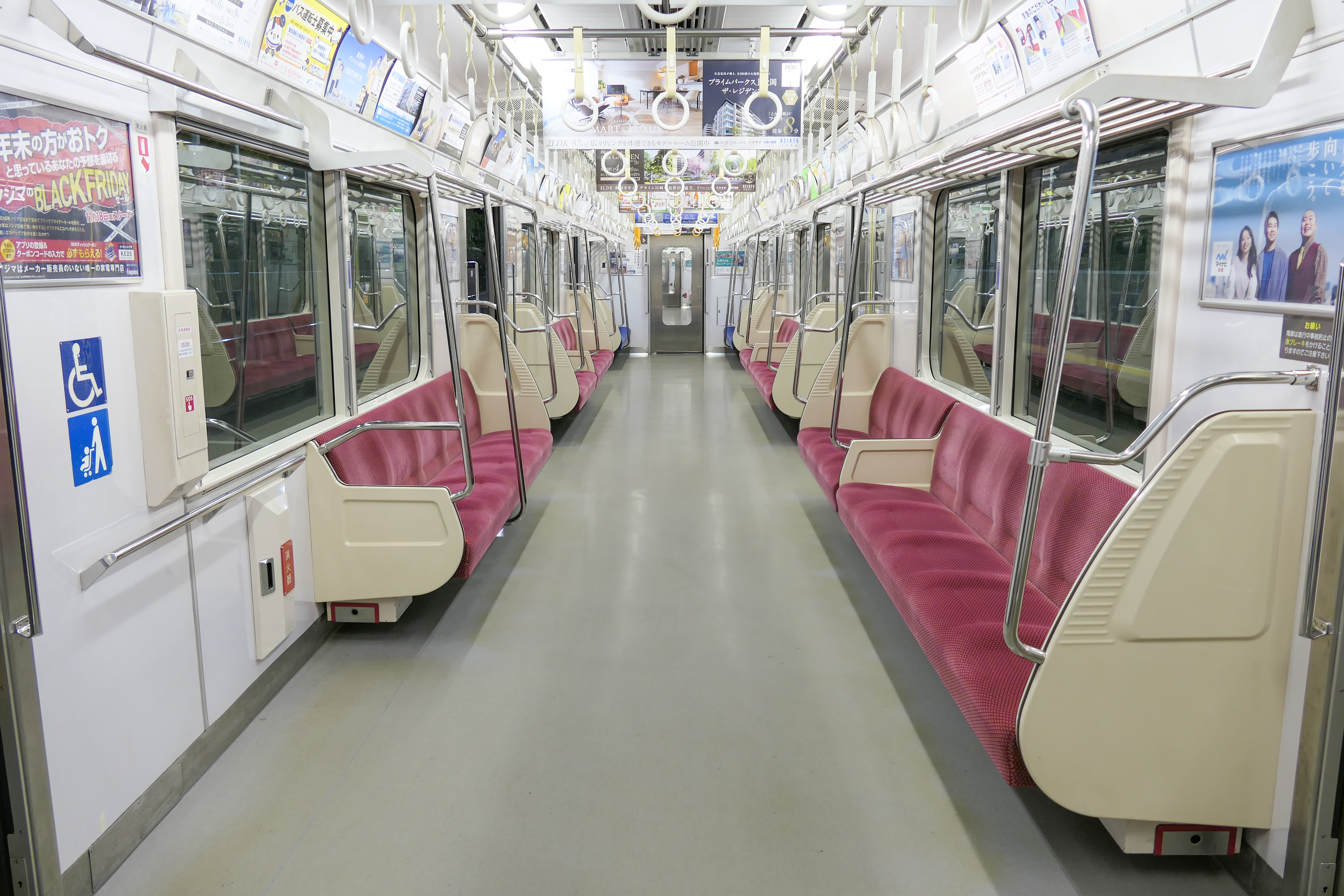
Interior with wheelchair/stroller space at left

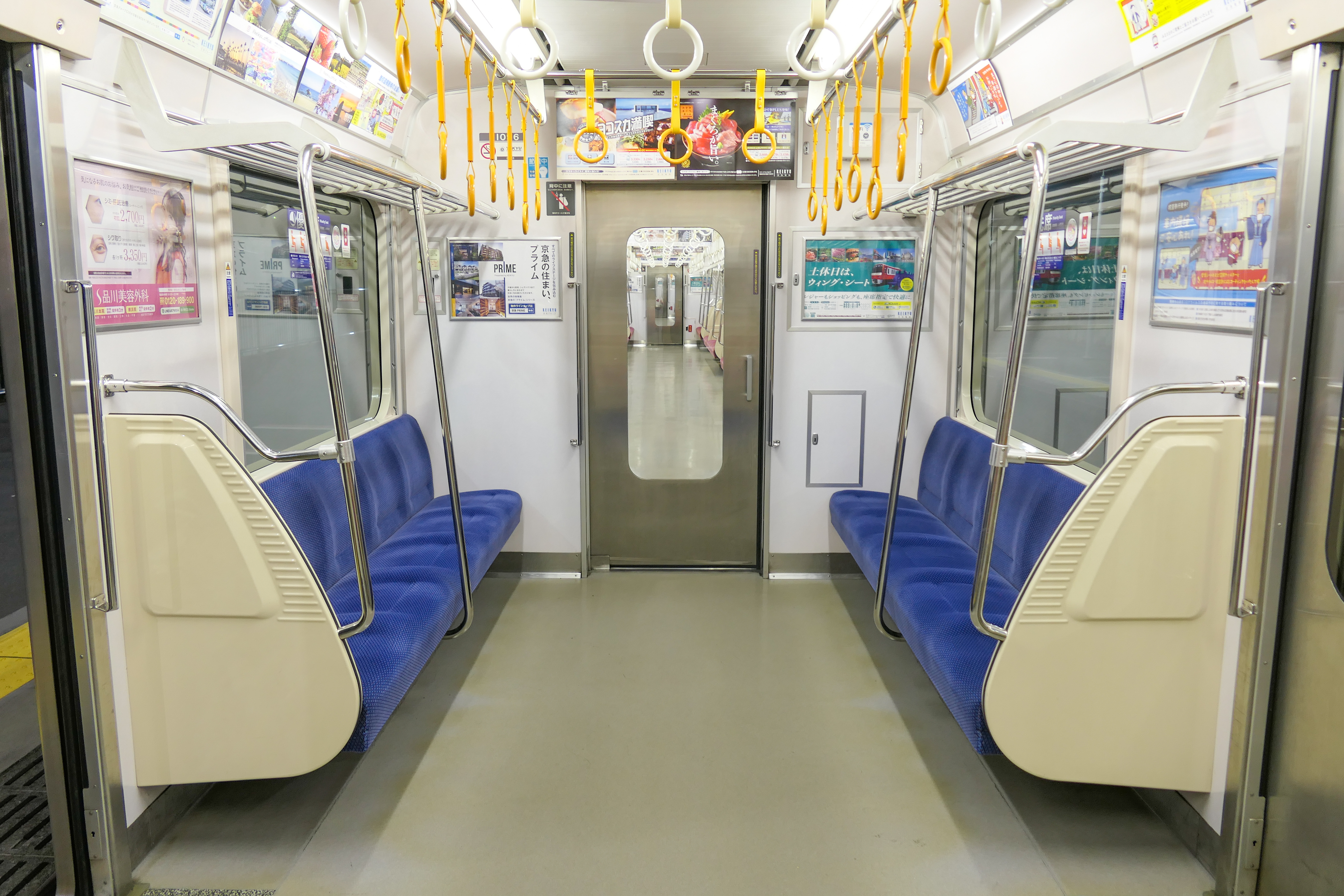
Priority seating

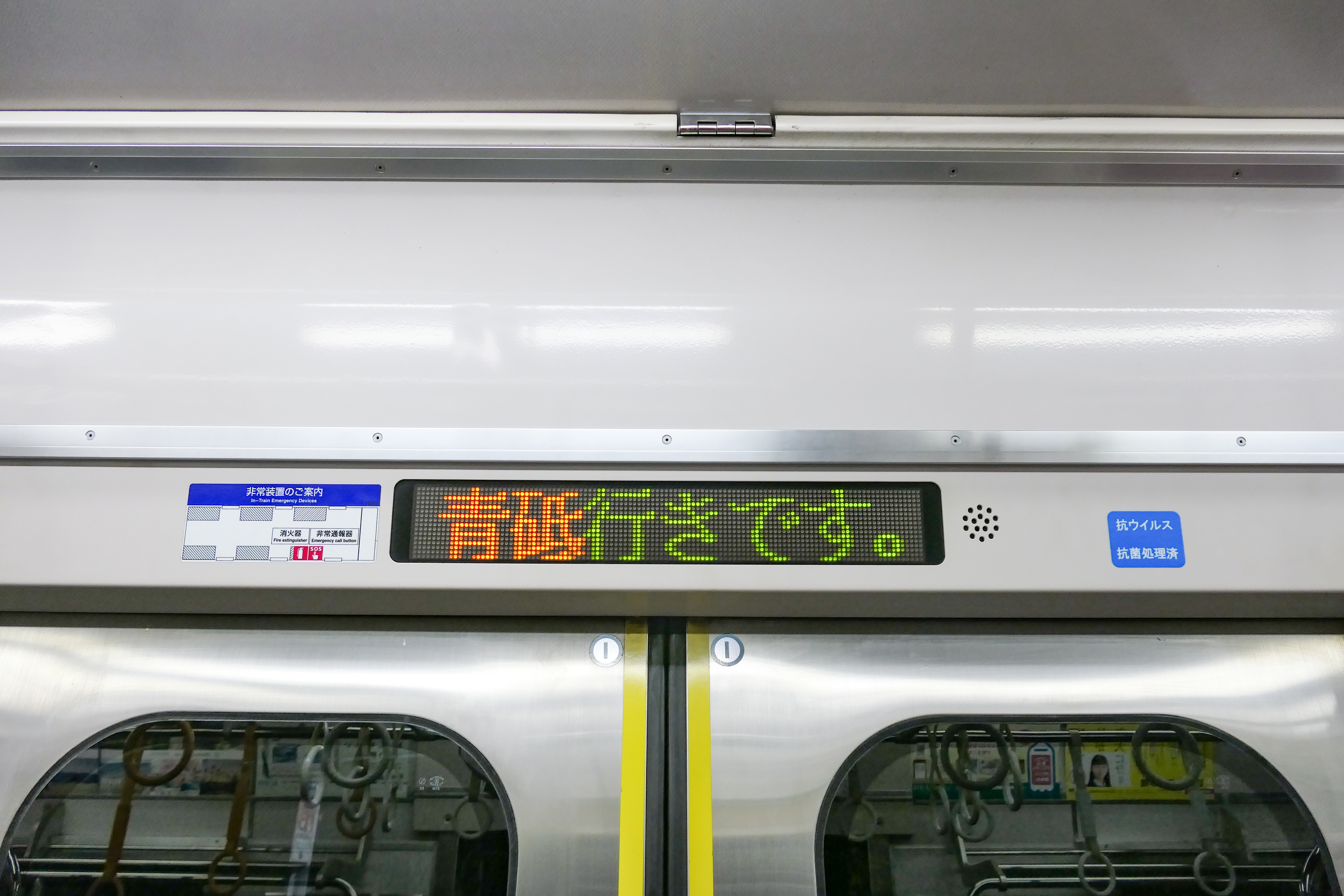
LED info display (batches 6–9)

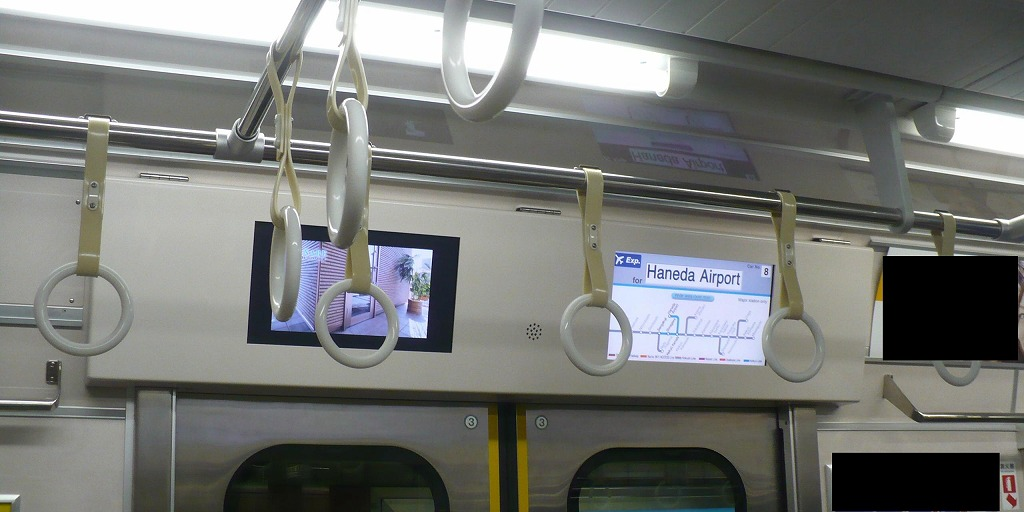
LCD info display (batches 10–15)

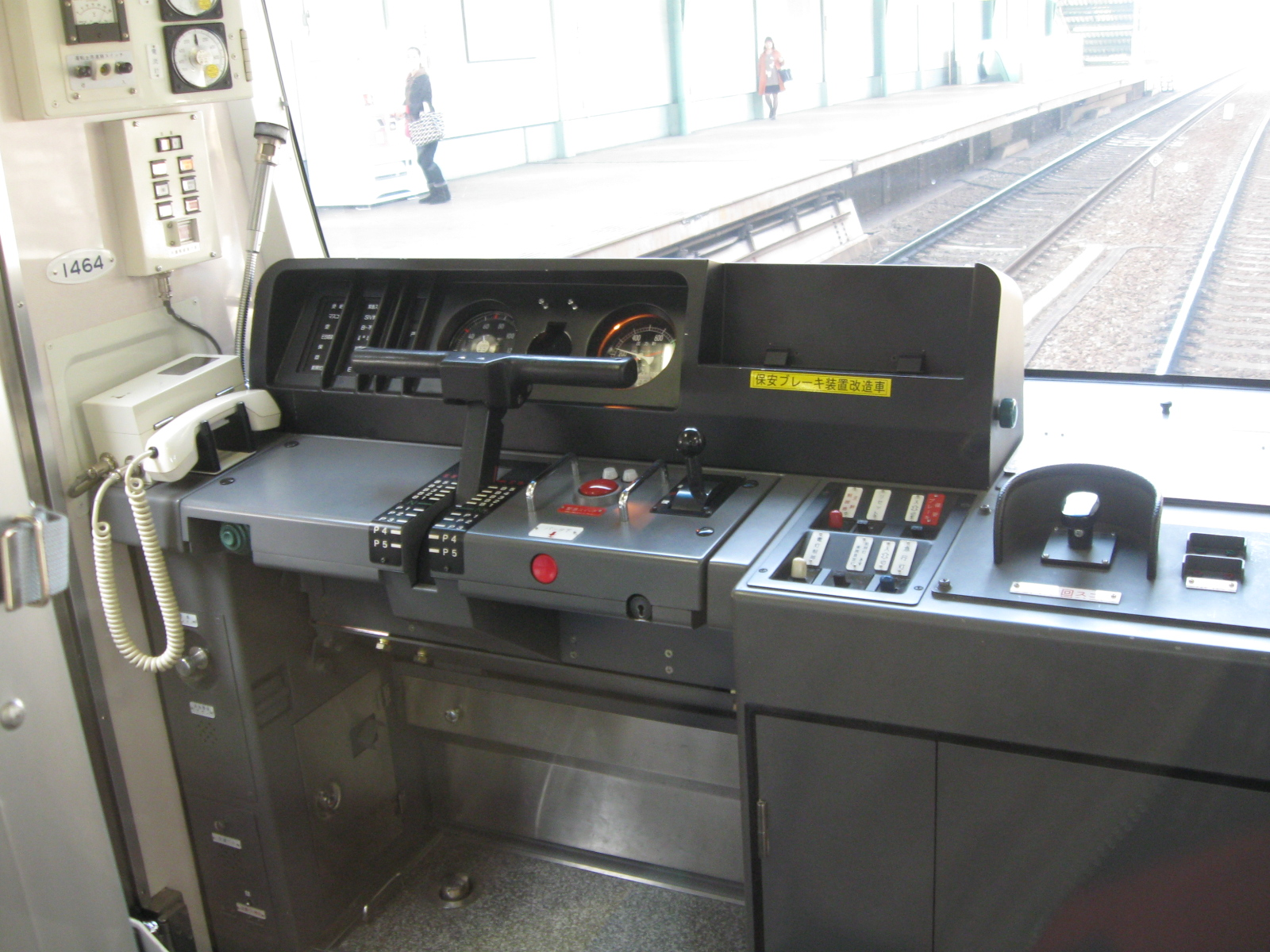
Driver's cab

==== Build histories ====
8-car sets
Set No.	Manufacturer	Date delivered	Batch
1073	Tokyu Car	14 March 2007	6
1081	Tokyu Car	21 January 2008	7
1089	Tokyu Car	8 February 2008	7
1097	Tokyu Car	27 October 2008	8
1105	Tokyu Car	17 November 2008	8
1113	Tokyu Car	15 December 2008	8
1121	Tokyu Car	10 May 2010	10
1129	Tokyu Car	2 June 2010	10
1137 (Note: Scrapped March 2020; accident damage)	Tokyu Car	21 June 2010	10
1145	Tokyu Car	10 January 2012	11
1153	J-TREC	6 April 2012	12
1161	J-TREC	27 August 2013	13
1169	J-TREC	24 June 2014	14

6-car sets
Set No.	Manufacturer	Date delivered	Batch
1301	Kawasaki HI	15 April 2011	11
1307	Kawasaki HI	22 April 2011	11
1313 (Note: First Keikyu trainset to use LED interior lighting from new)	Kawasaki HI	3 March 2012	11
1319	Kawasaki HI	17 April 2012	12
1325	Kawasaki HI	24 April 2012	12
1331	Kawasaki HI	7 January 2014	13
1337	Kawasaki HI	7 March 2014	13
1343	Kawasaki HI	22 April 2014	14
1349	Kawasaki HI	22 May 2014	14
1355	Kawasaki HI	8 August 2014	14
1361	Kawasaki HI	9 April 2015	15
1367 (Note: Fitted with Toshiba-supplied PMSMs)	Kawasaki HI	9 December 2015	15

4-car sets
Set No.	Manufacturer	Date delivered	Batch
1449	Kawasaki HI	22 September 2008	8
1453	Kawasaki HI	22 September 2008	8
1457	Kawasaki HI	1 April 2009	9
1461	Kawasaki HI	1 April 2009	9
1465	Kawasaki HI	3 April 2009	9
1469	Kawasaki HI	3 April 2009	9
1473	Kawasaki HI	22 May 2009	9
1477	Kawasaki HI	22 May 2009	9
1481	Kawasaki HI	4 June 2009	9
1485	Kawasaki HI	4 June 2009	9
1489	Kawasaki HI	17 March 2011	10

=== 1000-1800 series ===
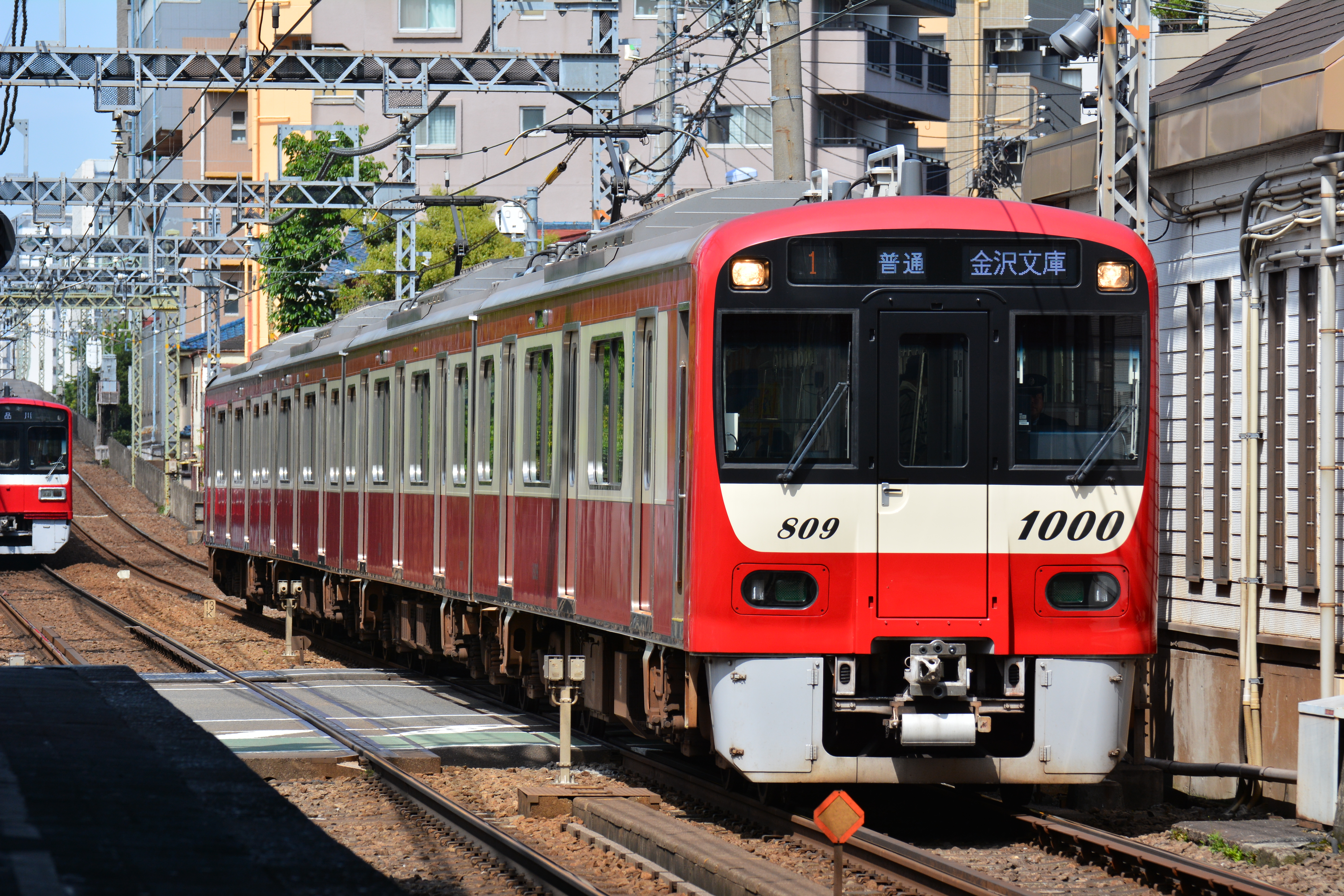
1000-1800 series set 1809 in May 2019

Two new 1000-1800 series four-car sets (1801 and 1805) were delivered from J-TREC in February 2016. These two sets differ from earlier variants in having centre gangways on the cab ends as well as a vinyl-based red and ivory livery. The centre gangways allow the sets to form eight-car trains for use on through services to the Asakusa Line and Keisei lines. These two sets entered revenue service on 4 March 2016.

A third set, 1809, was delivered ahead of the 16th batch on 30 September 2016.

=== Batches 16–19 ===
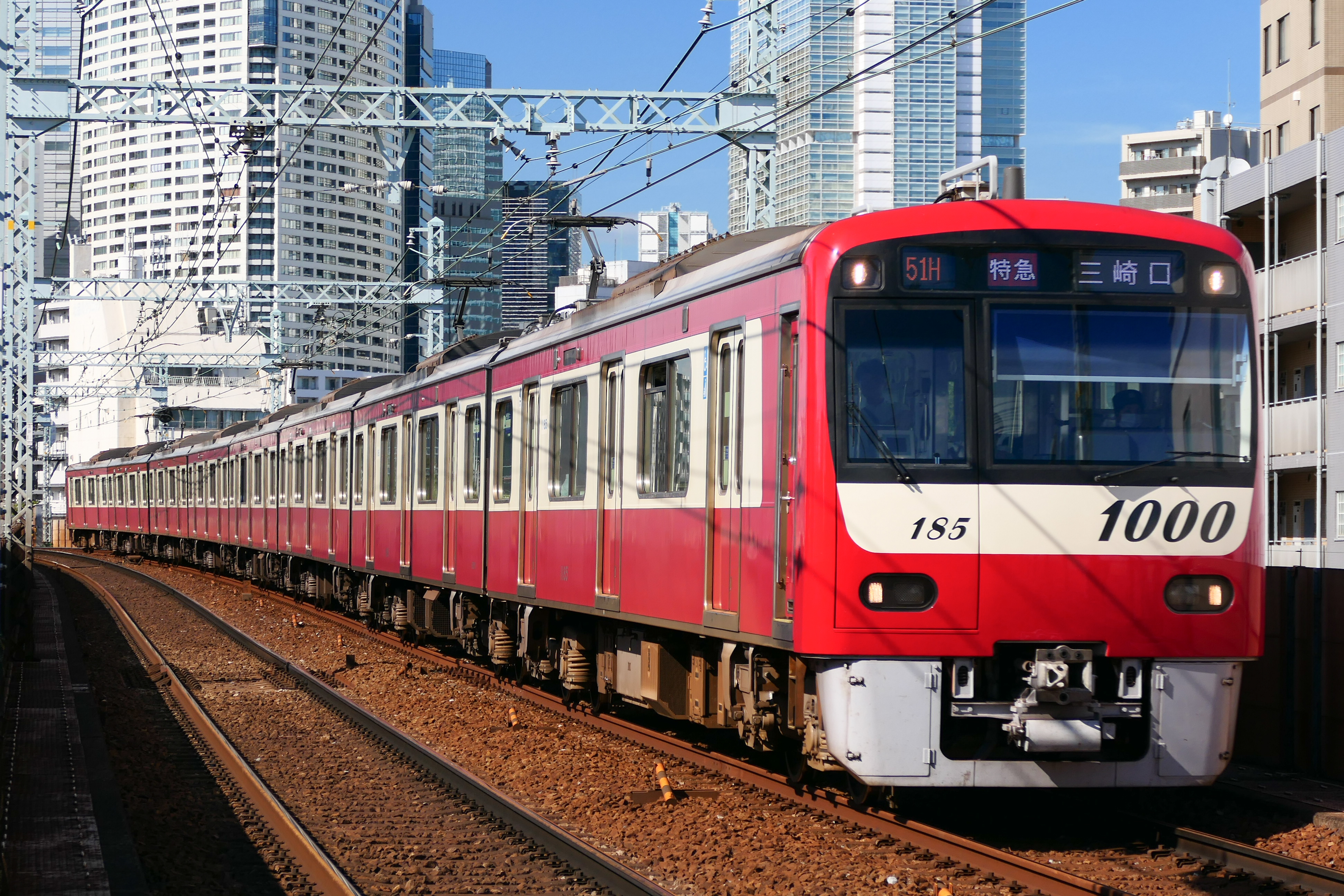
16th-batch 8-car set 1185 in September 2023

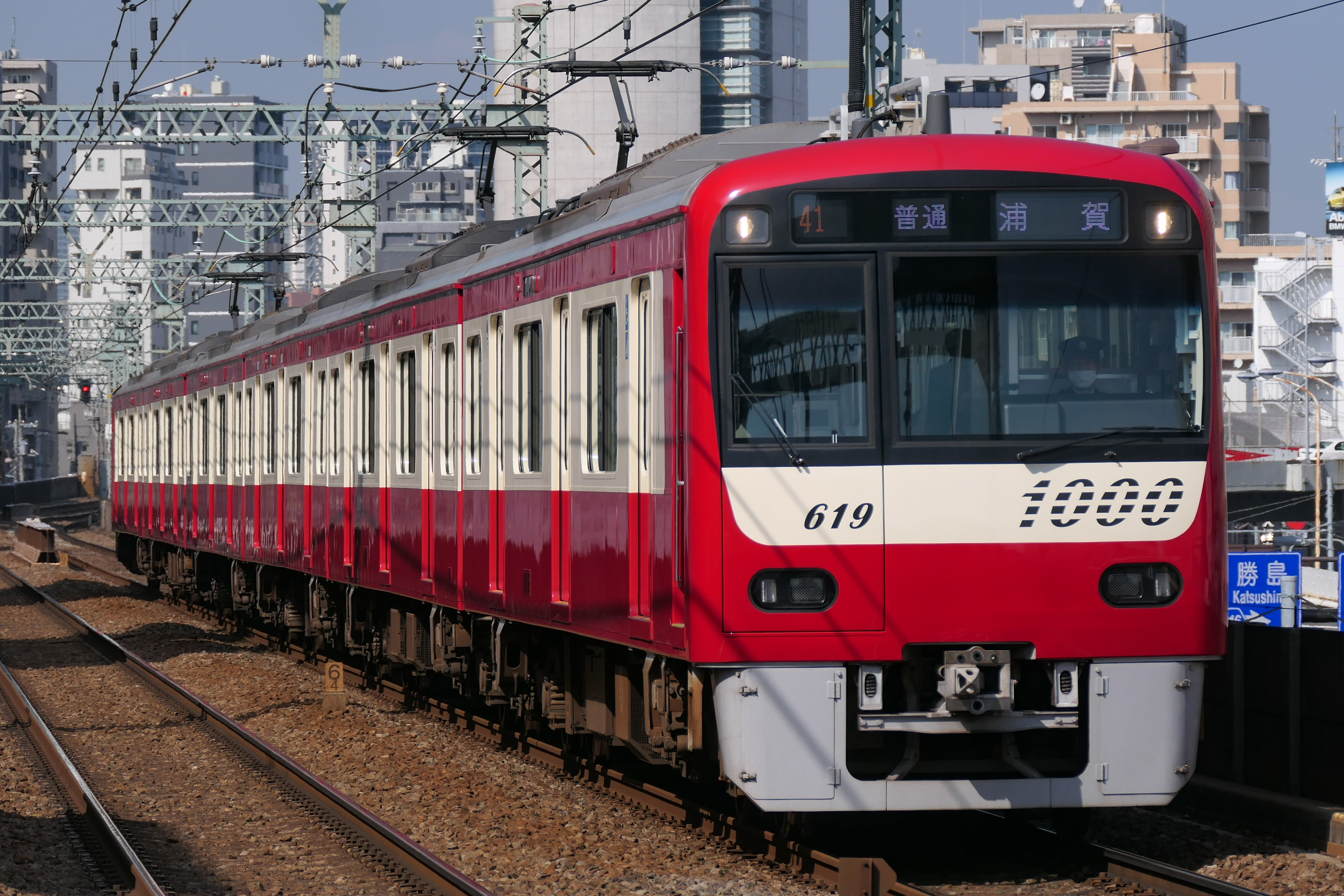
17th-batch 6-car set 1619 in March 2022

These are six- and eight-car sets manufactured by J-TREC and Kawasaki Heavy Industries between 2016 and 2019.

==== External changes ====
While they inherit the stainless-steel bodies used with the N1000 series fleet since 2007, the 16th-batch sets carry a film-wrapped livery akin to that of the 1000-1800 series sets. For the 17th batch of sets, film-wrapped liveries were discontinued in favour of painted liveries. Keikyu states that these sets are the first privately operated, stainless steel-bodied sets to incorporate full-surface painting on a large scale in the Kanto region.

LED lighting is used throughout, and the 16th-batch sets are Keikyu's first to use LED headlights from new.

==== Internal changes ====
These batches incorporate a combination of longitudinal and transverse seating. Each car has two bays of transverse seating, one at each end. The longitudinal seat partitions were enlarged to reduce wind gusts and interference between seated and standing occupants. Also provided are power outlets and LCD information displays, some of which support Japanese and English, and others that support Korean and simplified Chinese.

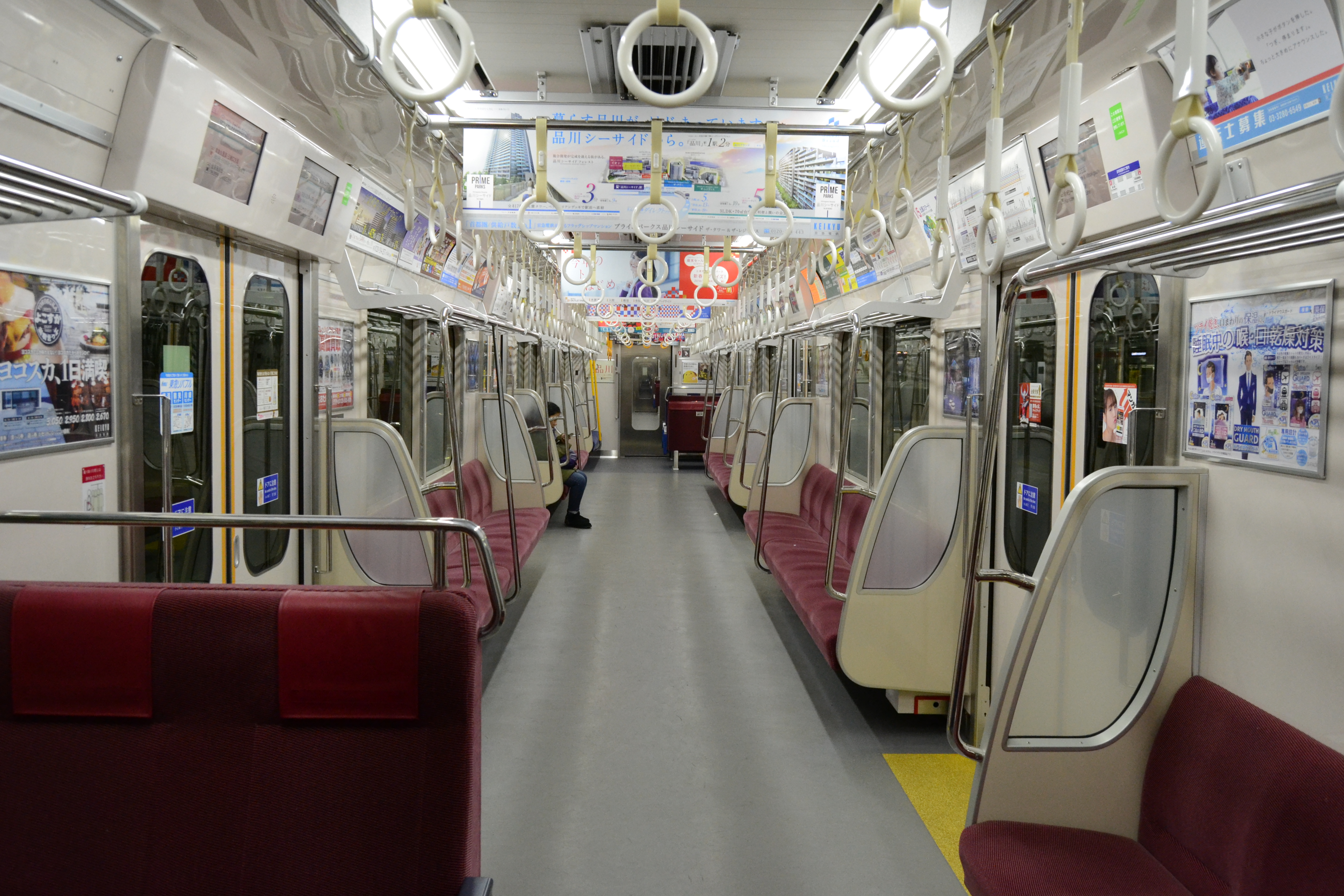
Interior view

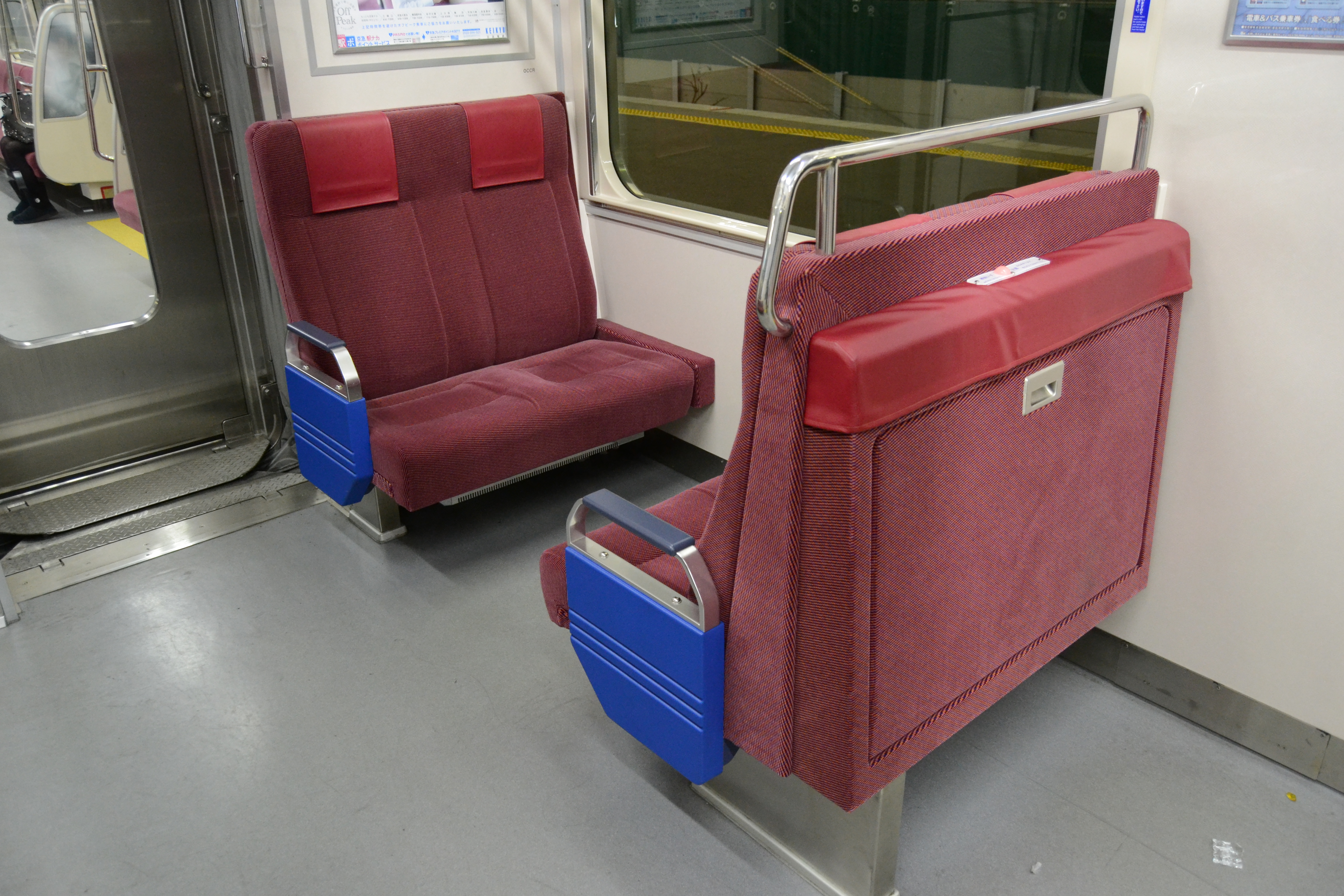
Transverse seating bay

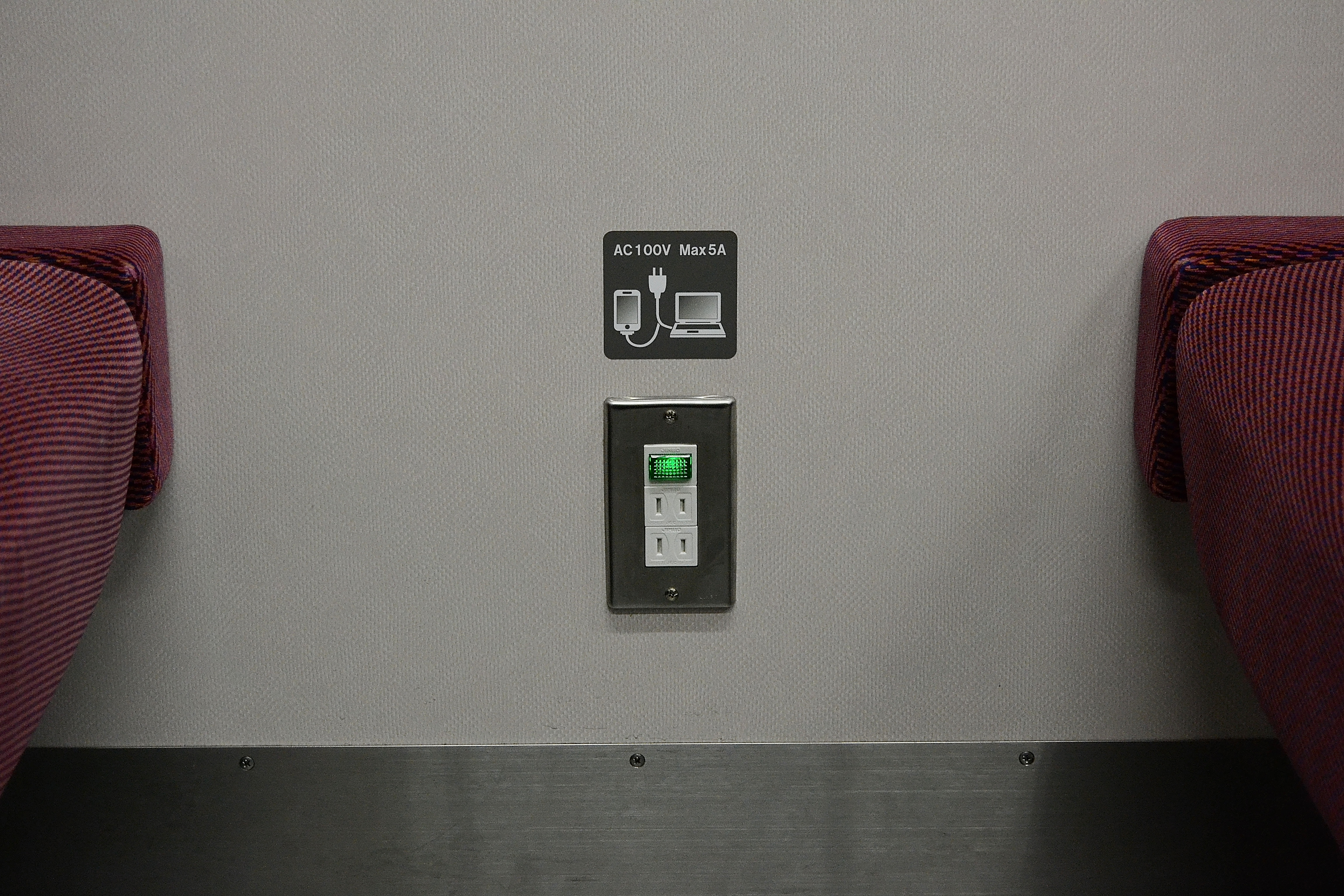
Power outlets

==== Technical changes ====
Beginning with batch 16, eight-car sets use Mitsubishi-developed full SiC (silicon carbide)-based (Note: "Full SiC" entails a power module combining an SiC MOSFET (metal–oxide–semiconductor field-effect transistor) with an SiC SBD (Schottky barrier diode).) traction systems with fully enclosed motors uprated to 190 kW (255 hp), compared to 155 kW (208 hp) in earlier sets.

==== Build histories ====
8-car sets
Set No.	Manufacturer	Date delivered	Batch
1177	J-TREC	22 December 2016	16
1185	J-TREC	21 February 2017	16
1201	J-TREC	2017	17
1209	J-TREC	2018	17
1217	J-TREC	29 March 2018	17
1225	J-TREC	2 September 2019	19

6-car sets
Set No.	Manufacturer	Date delivered	Batch
1601	Kawasaki HI	7 November 2016	16
1607	Kawasaki HI	29 November 2016	16
1613	Kawasaki HI	5 January 2018	17
1619	Kawasaki HI	5 February 2018	17
1625	Kawasaki HI	10 October 2018	18
1631	Kawasaki HI	8 June 2018	18
1637	Kawasaki HI	18 June 2018	18
1643	J-TREC	8 August 2018	18
1649	Kawasaki HI	25 December 2018	18
1655	J-TREC	26 February 2019	18
1661	J-TREC	19 March 2019	18
1667	Kawasaki HI	2019	19

=== 1000-1890 series "Le Ciel" (batches 20 and 21) ===
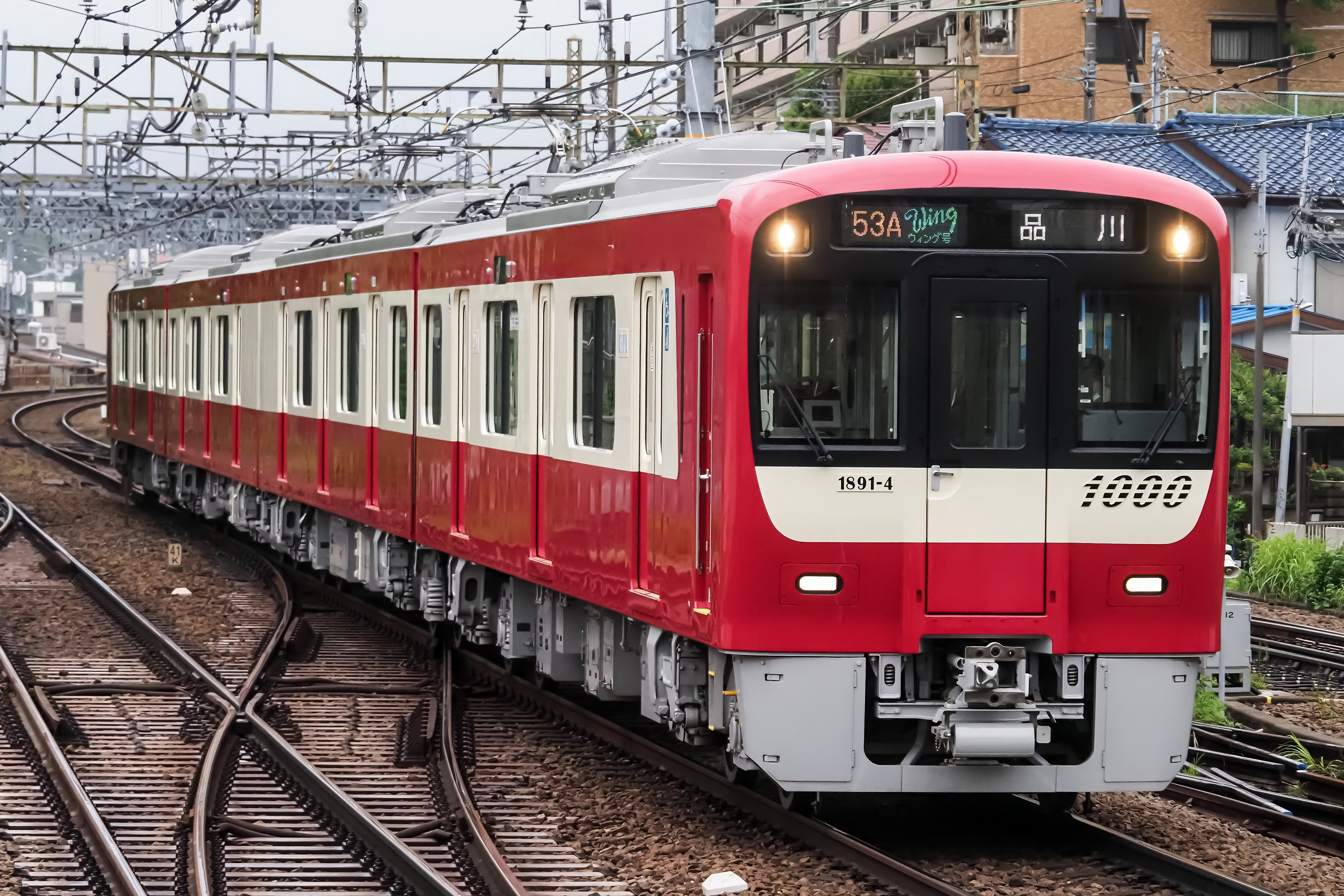
1000-1890 series set 1891 in May 2021

The 1000-1890 series four-car sets were manufactured from 2021. Due to replace older 1500 series trainsets, the first two sets were introduced into service from 6 May 2021 as part of batch 20. These are the first trains in the fleet to feature rotating banks of seats; they can be arranged in a longitudinal or transverse seating configuration when required. The seats are similar to those used on the 2100 series but are 10 mm (0.39 in) wider. Power sockets are also provided. They are also the first trainsets in the fleet to feature toilets; car 2 features a universal-access Western toilet, and car 3 features a men's toilet. The trains are intended for use on reserved seat "Wing" services as well as chartered event services.

Following their initial entry into service, Keikyu procured three additional 4-car sets as part of its investment plan for fiscal 2021: 1893–1895.

Following a nickname contest for the 1000-1890 series fleet held between June and July 2021, the nickname "Le Ciel" (The Sky in French) was announced for the 1000-1890 series fleet on 24 December. Four entries were given honourable mentions: "Red Rabbit", "Leap", "Sunsun", and "Kofu". From 26 March 2022, the intermediate cars of sets 1891, 1892, 1894, and 1895 were adorned with "Le Ciel" branding.

On 26 May 2022, the 1000-1890 series received the Blue Ribbon Award. Set 1893 was adorned with branding commemorating the award.

- 4-car sets x5: 1891, 1892, 1893, 1894, 1895
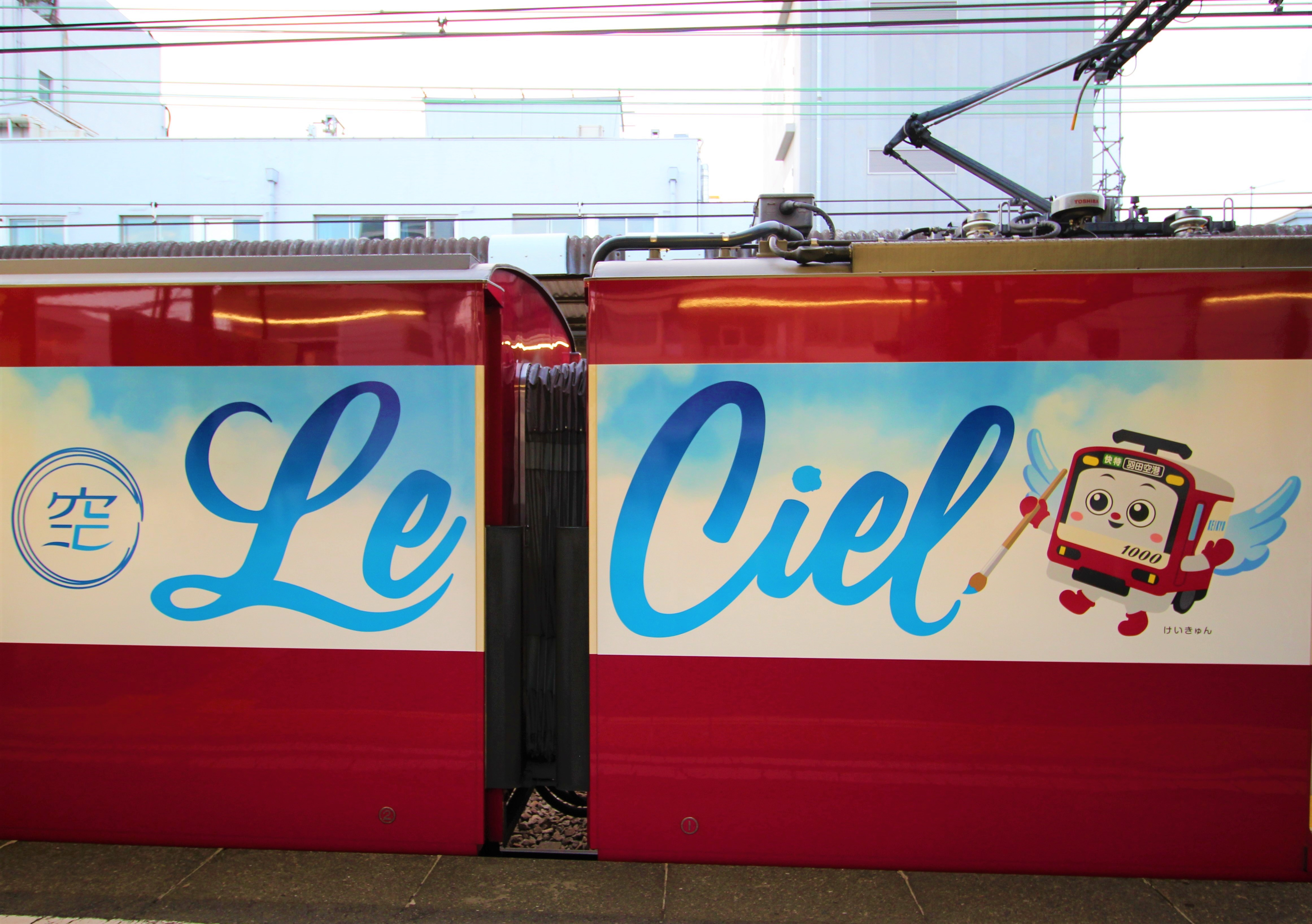
"Le Ciel" branding as used with the 1000-1890 series

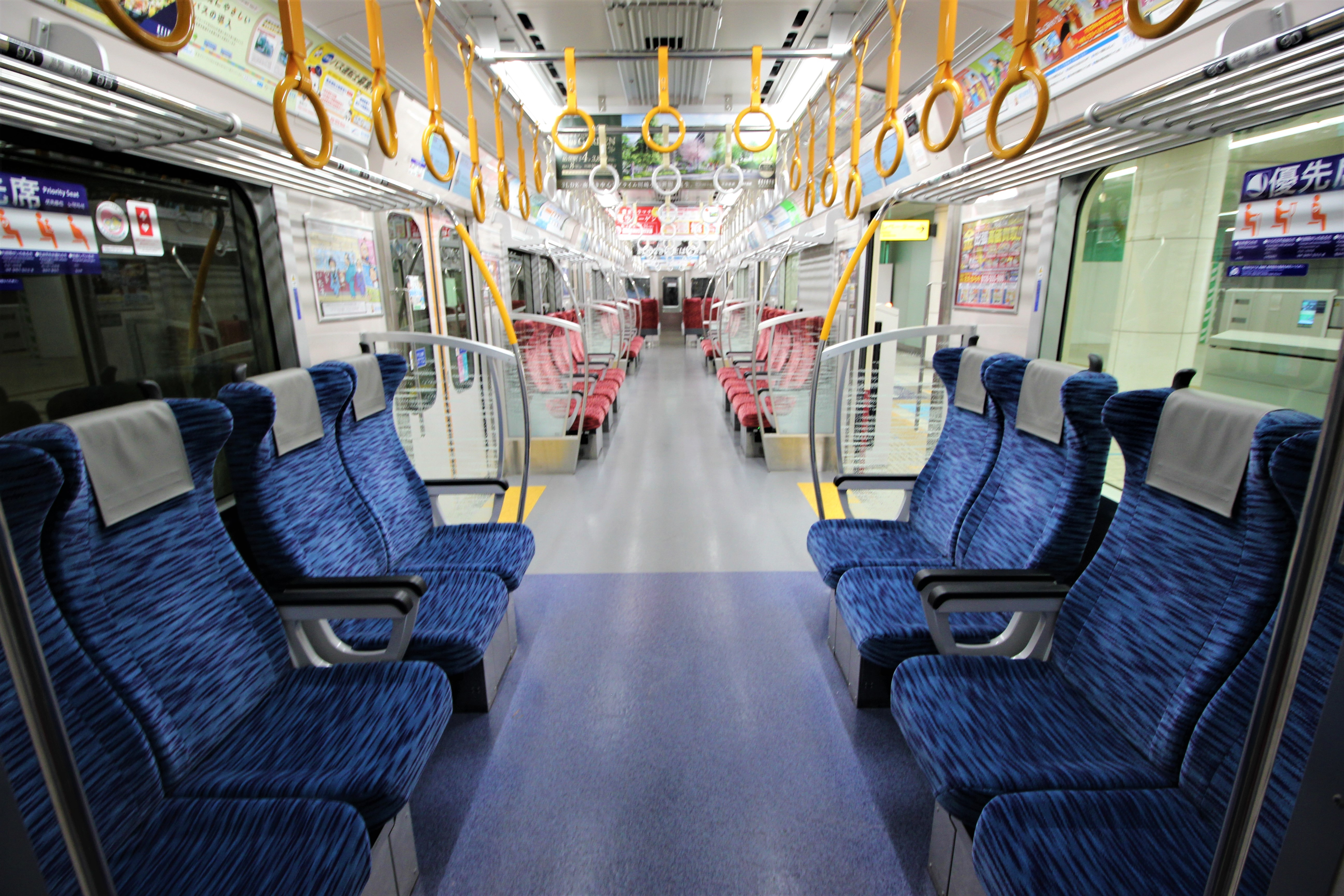
Interior of a 1000-1890 series set

=== Batches 22–24 ===
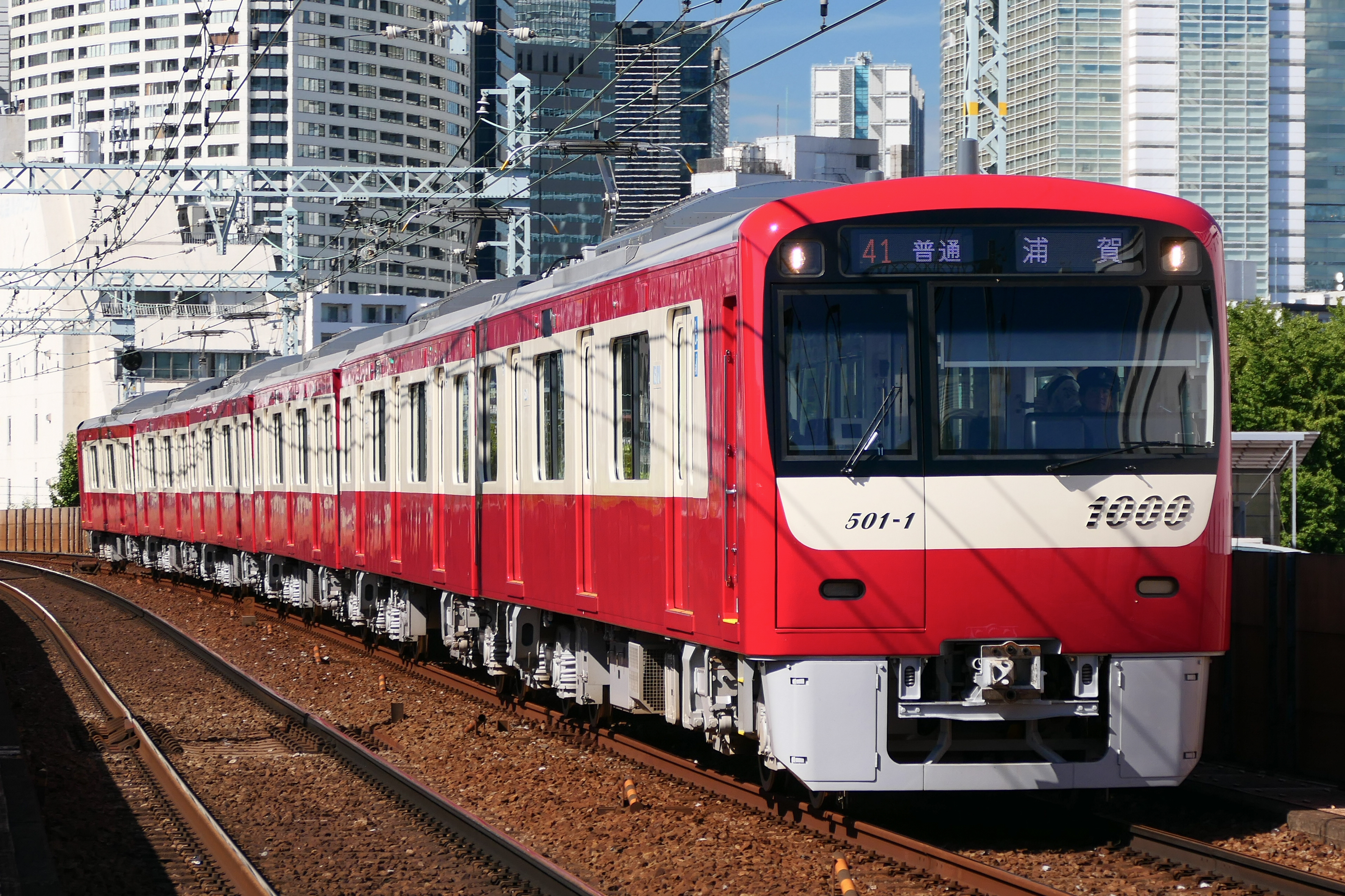
22nd-batch 6-car set 1501 in September 2023

Keikyu announced the 22nd N1000 series batch as part of its investment plan for fiscal 2023, consisting of one 8-car set and one 6-car set. The first set, 6-car set 1501, was delivered from the Kawasaki Railcar Manufacturing plant on 28 July 2023 and entered service on 7 September.

For batch 23, announced as part of Keikyu's fiscal 2025 investment plan, two 8-car sets were ordered. The new trains return to using film-wrapped liveries instead of painted bodywork. The side windows for the seat bays behind the crew compartment, which were introduced with the 1890 subseries, were also discontinued. The first 23rd-batch set, 1702, was delivered from the J-TREC Yokohama plant in January 2026 and entered service on 10 February of that year.

For batch 24, announced as part of Keikyu's capital investment plan for fiscal year 2026, four 4-car sets and four 2-car sets were ordered. These will be the first 2-car sets in the N1000 series fleet.

==== Build histories ====
Set No.	No. of cars	Manufacturer	Date delivered	Batch
1501	6	Kawasaki Railcar Mfg.	28 July 2023	22
1701	8	J-TREC	2 November 2023	22
1702	8	J-TREC	16 January 2026	23
(1 set on order)	8			23
(4 sets on order)	4			24
(4 sets on order)	2			24

== Formations ==
=== 8-car sets 1001 to 1033 ===
The five eight-car (aluminium bodied) sets 1001 to 1033 are formed as follows, with four motored (M) cars and four trailer (T) cars.

Designation	Muc	Tpu	Tu	Mu	Ms	Ts	Tps	Msc
Numbering	1xxx	1xxx	1xxx	1xxx	1xxx	1xxx	1xxx	1xxx

The "Tpu" and "Tps" cars are each fitted with two single-arm pantographs.

=== 8-car sets 1041 to 1065 ===
The five eight-car (aluminium bodied) sets 1041 to 1065 are formed as follows, with six motored (M) cars and two trailer (T) cars.

Designation	Muc	Tpu	M2u	M1u	M1s	M2s	Tps	Msc
Numbering	1xxx	1xxx	1xxx	1xxx	1xxx	1xxx	1xxx	1xxx

The "Tpu" and "Tps" cars are each fitted with two single-arm pantographs.

=== 8-car sets 1073 to 1185 and 1201 to 1225 ===
The eighteen eight-car (stainless steel bodied) sets 1073 to 1185 and 1201 to 1225 are formed as follows, with six motored (M) cars and two trailer (T) cars.

Designation	M2uc	M1u	Tu	M1u'	M2s	Ts	M1s	M2sc
Numbering	1xxx							

The "M1u" and "M1s" cars are each fitted with two single-arm pantographs, and the "M1u'" are fitted with one pantograph.

=== 6-car sets 1301 to 1367 and 1601 to 1667 ===
The twenty-four six-car (stainless steel bodied) sets 1301 to 1367 and 1601 to 1667 are formed as follows, with four motored (M) cars and two trailer (T) cars.

Designation	M2uc	M1u	Tu	Ts	M1s	M2sc
Numbering	13xx					

On 1301–1367, the "M1u" cars are fitted with one single-arm pantograph, while "M1s" cars are fitted with two single-arm pantographs. On 1601–1667, the "M1u" and "M1s" cars are each fitted with two single-arm pantographs.

=== 4-car sets 1401 and 1405 ===
The first batch of four-car (aluminium bodied) sets, numbered 1401 and 1405, are formed as follows, with two motored (M) cars and two trailer (T) cars.

Designation	M1uc	T1pu	T1ps	M1sc
Numbering	14xx			

The "T1pu" and "T1ps" cars are each fitted with one single-arm pantograph.

=== 4-car sets 1409 and 1413 ===
The two four-car (aluminium bodied) sets 1409 and 1413 are formed as follows, with two motored (M) cars and two trailer (T) cars.

Designation	M1uc	T	Tp	M1sc
Numbering	1xxx			

The "Tp" cars are fitted with two single-arm pantographs.

=== 4-car sets 1417 to 1445 ===
The eight four-car (aluminium bodied) sets 1417 to 1445 are formed as follows, with three motored (M) cars and one trailer (T) car.

Designation	M1uc	M2	Tp	M1sc
Numbering	14xx			

The "Tp" cars are fitted with two single-arm pantographs.

=== 4-car sets 1449 to 1489 and 1801 to 1809 ===
The 16 four-car (stainless steel bodied) sets 1449 to 1489, 1801 to 1809, and 1891 to 1892 are formed as follows, with all cars motored (M).

Designation	M2uc	M1u	M1s	M2sc
Numbering	14xx/18xx			

The "M1u" and "M1s" cars are each fitted with one single-arm pantograph. The 18xx cars have end gangways that can be connected to form 8-car trains for through service to Asakusa and Keisei Lines.

=== 1000-1890 series 4-car sets ===
The 1000-1890 series four-car sets are formed as follows, with two motored (M) cars and two trailer (T) cars. The "Muc2" car is at the Misakiguchi end.

Designation	Muc2	Tuv2	Tpsv2	Msc2
Numbering	189x-1	189x-2	189x-3	189x-4
Weight (t)	34.5	30.5	33.0	34.5
Capacity (total)	101	107	111	101

The "Tpsv2" cars are fitted with two single-arm pantographs.

== Refurbishment ==
On 10 May 2017, Keikyu announced that it would make investments in safety and comfort that would total approximately 21.9 billion yen. Also announced was refurbishment work for eight N1000 series cars. The work includes:

- Opening side windows
- Removal of roof-mounted exhaust fans
- Enlarged seat partitions
- Replacement of traction equipment
- Replacement of roller-blind destination indicators in favour of full-colour LED destination indicators
- Replacement of external and internal lighting with LEDs
- Replacement of above-door LED passenger information displays with LCD displays
- Visual door warnings
- Replacement of cooling equipment

Eight-car set 1001, the first set to be treated, returned to service on 18 September 2017.

== Livery variations ==
=== Haneda Airport Terminal 2 ===
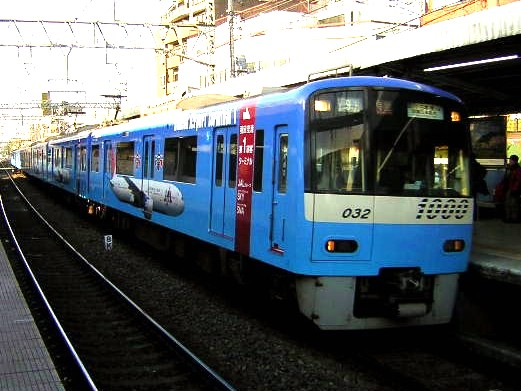
2nd-batch set 1025 reliveried to commemorate the opening of Haneda Airport Terminal 2 in March 2005

8-car sets 1025 and 1033 received a sky-blue livery to commemorate the opening of Haneda Airport Terminal 2. They carried this livery until March 2005.

=== Yellow Happy Train ===
8-car set 1057 was repainted into a special "Yellow Happy Train" livery from May 2014, for the collaboration with the private railway operator Seibu Railway. In return, Seibu repainted one of its 9000 series trainsets into Keikyu livery, known as the "Seibu Red Lucky Train". The "Yellow Happy Train" livery was originally intended to be used for about three years; however, due to its popularity, on 27 April 2017, Keikyu announced its decision to keep the livery and to also repaint the passenger doors yellow from their original silver colour.

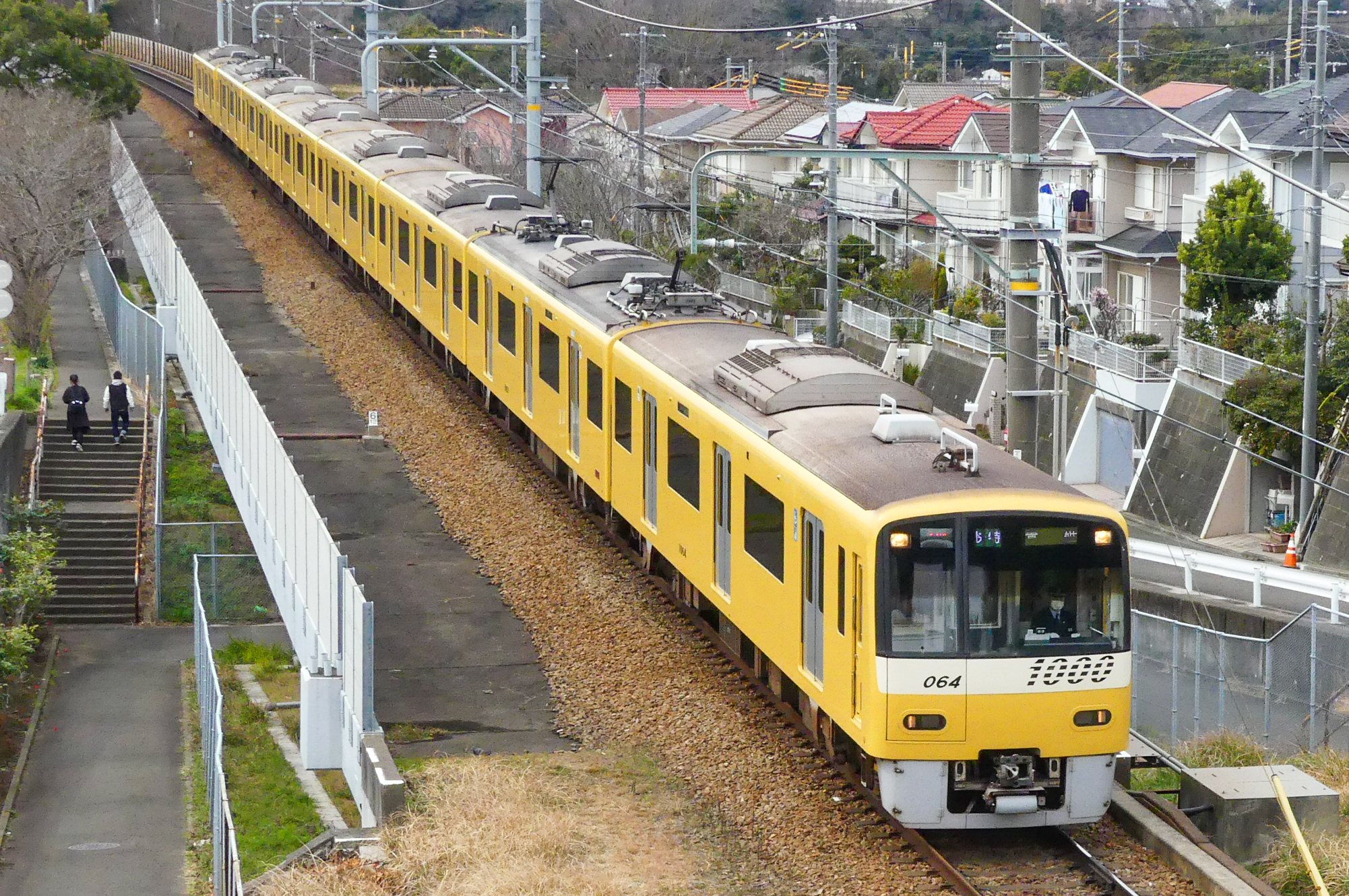
The "Yellow Happy Train" livery with original silver doors in March 2017

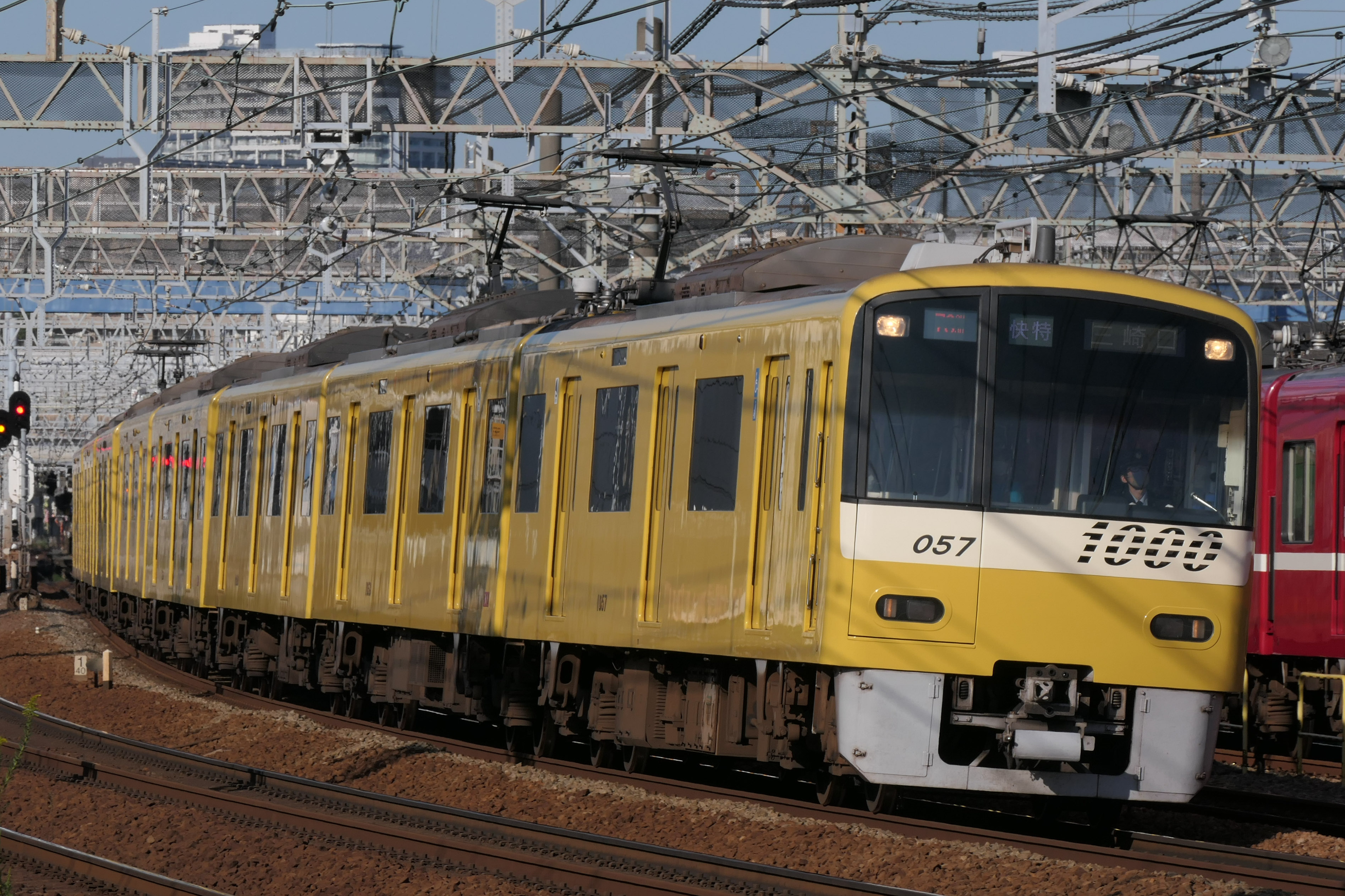
Updated "Yellow Happy Train" livery with yellow doors in October 2020

== Accidents ==
Set 1137 was involved in a collision with a truck on a level crossing near Kanagawa-shimmachi Station on 5 September 2019, killing the truck driver and injuring the train driver and 32 passengers. The set was substantially damaged and scrapped in March 2020.
