= Keikyu 1500 series =

Japanese train type

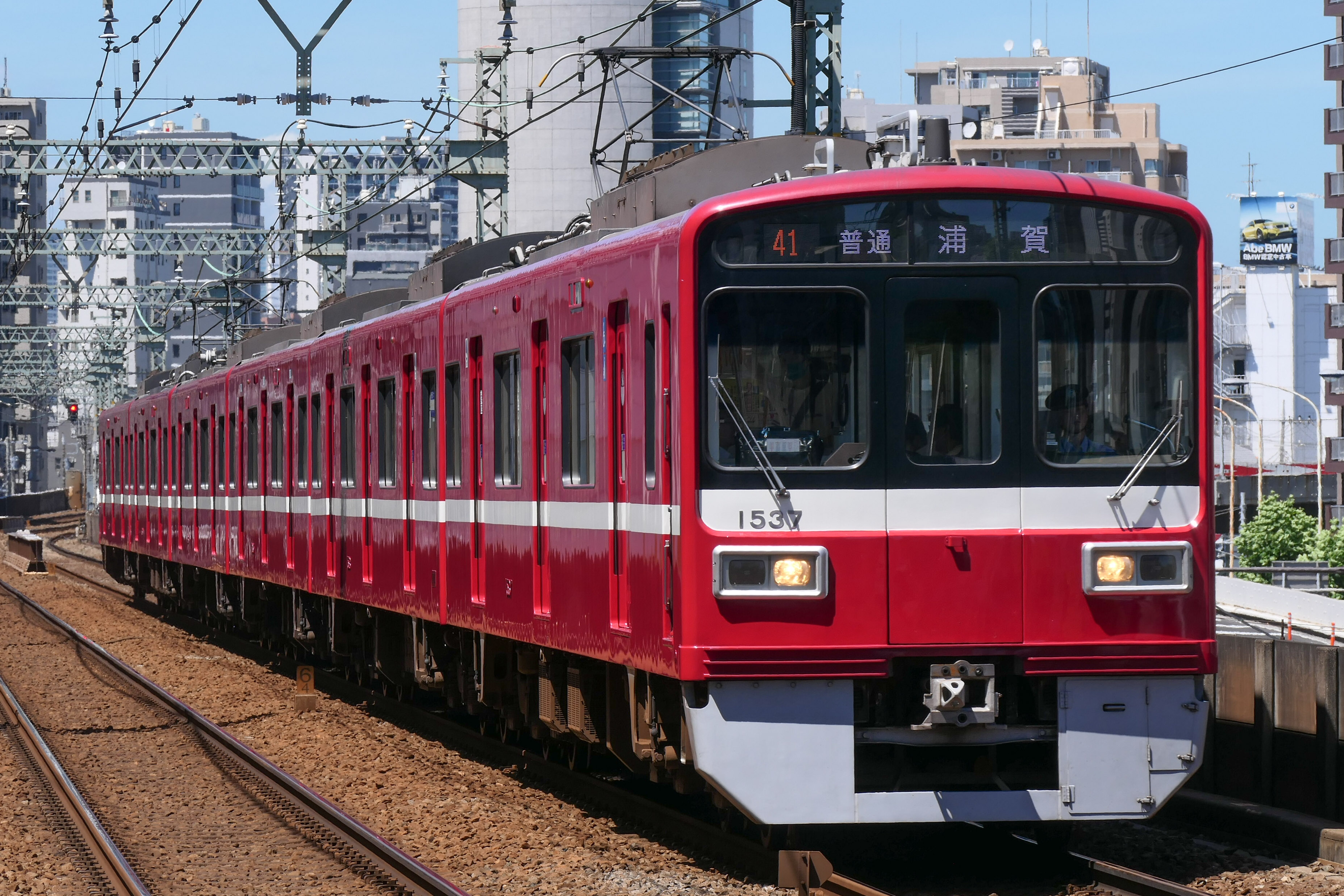
- 6-car set 1537 in July 2021
- Manufacturer: Tokyu Car Corporation, Kawasaki Heavy Industries
- Constructed: 1985–1991
- Entered service: 1985
- Refurbished: 2002–
- Scrapped: 2022–
- Number built: 166 vehicles (28 sets)
- Number in service: 138 vehicles (22 sets)
- Number scrapped: 28 vehicles (6 sets)
- Formation: 4/6/8 cars per trainset
- Fleet numbers: 1501–1549; 1561–1593; 1701–1731
- Operators: Keikyu

Specifications
- Car body construction: Aluminium, steel (sets 1501 to 1517)
- Car length: 18,000 mm (59 ft 1 in)
- Width: 2,830 mm (9 ft 3 in)
- Doors: 3 pairs per side
- Maximum speed: 120 km/h (75 mph)
- Traction system: Field chopper Variable frequency (GTO/IGBT)
- Electric system(s): 1,500 V DC Overhead catenary
- Current collection: Pantograph
- Multiple working: 600 series, N1000 series, 2100 series
- Track gauge: 1,435 mm (4 ft 8 1/2 in)

The Keikyu 1500 series (京急1500形) is an electric multiple unit (EMU) train type operated by private railway operator Keikyu on commuter services in the Tokyo area of Japan since 1985.

== Operations ==
The eight-car sets are primarily used on limited-stop "Rapid Limited Express" and "Limited Express" services on the Keikyu Main Line, including through-running services to and from the Toei Asakusa Line and the Keisei Oshiage Line. The four- and six-car sets are mostly used on all-stations "Local" services. The 1500 series sets can be used in multiple with other Keikyu EMU types, including the 600 series, N1000 series, 2000 series, and 2100 series.

== Formations ==
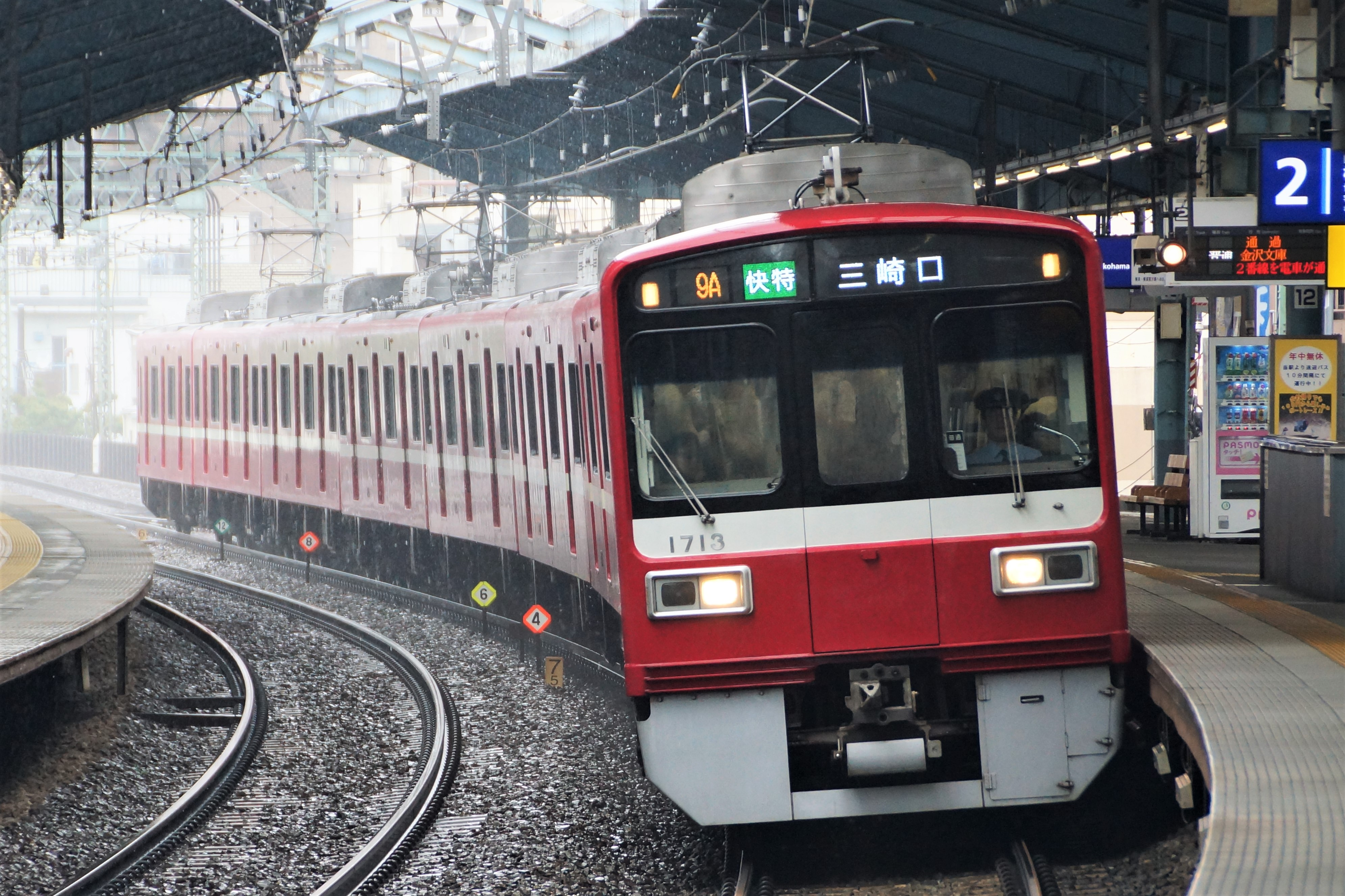
Set 1713 in May 2017, retro-fitted with full-colour LED destination indicators

As of March 2023, the fleet consists of 138 vehicles formed as six-car, and eight-car sets, as follows.

=== 4-car sets 1501 to 1525 ===
Designation	M1c	M2	M1	M2c
Numbering	15xx	15xx	15xx	15xx

- The "M1c" and "M1" cars are each fitted with one lozenge-type pantograph.
- Sets 1501 to 1517 have steel bodies, all of which are now retired as of March 2023. All other sets have aluminum bodies.

=== 6-car sets 1529 to 1549, 1561 to 1593 ===
15 six-car formed by adding two 1900 trailer cars to four-car sets. Sets 1561 to 1593 were originally numbered 1601 to 1649.

Designation	M1c	M2	Tu	Ts	M1	M2c
Numbering	1xxx	1xxx	19xx	19xx	1xxx	1xxx

- The "M1c" cars are fitted with one lozenge-type pantograph, and the "M1" cars are fitted with two.

=== 8-car sets 1701 to 1731 ===
5 eight-car sets formed by adding two 1900 trailer cars to six-car sets.

Designation	M1c	M2	Tu	Ts	M1	M2	M1	M2c
Numbering	17xx	17xx	19xx	19xx	17xx	17xx	17xx	17xx

- The "M1c" and end "M1" cars are each fitted with one lozenge-type pantograph, and the centre "M1" cars are fitted with two.

== Interior ==
Passenger accommodation consists of longitudinal bench seating throughout.

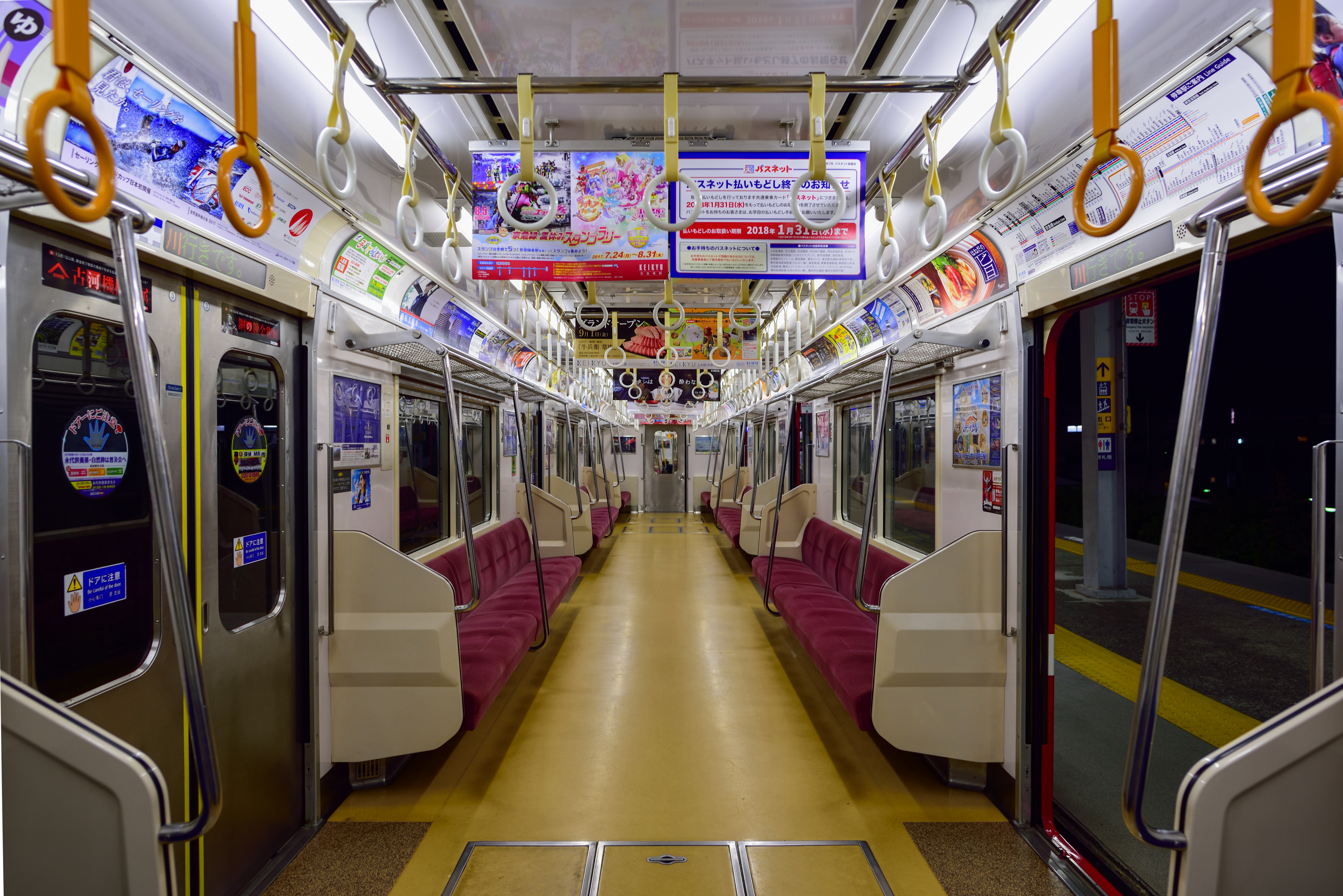
Interior view

== History ==
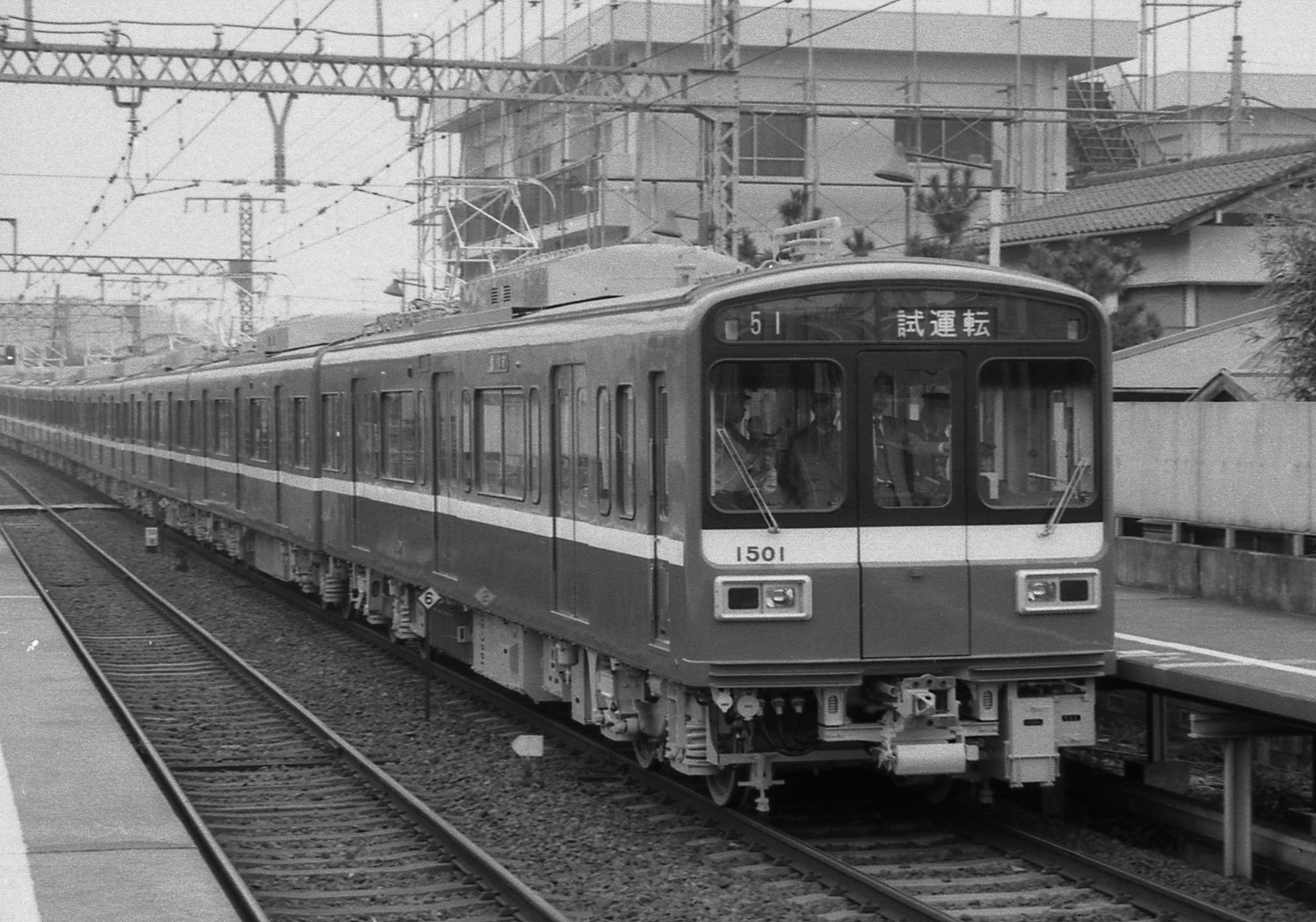
Four-car steel-bodied set 1501 in original style in April 1985

The 1500 series fleet was built between 1985 and 1991. The first five four-car sets delivered had steel bodies, while all subsequent sets had aluminium bodies with door pocket windows discontinued. Sets built from 1990 onward used VVVF control.

A programme of life-extension refurbishment commenced in 2002. This involved adding new air-conditioning units, removing the original door pocket windows of the steel bodied cars, and adding front-end skirts.

On 24 September 2012, set 1701 derailed between Oppama Station and Keikyu Taura Station. It was since retired and was replaced by Keikyu N1000 set 1169.

=== Withdrawal ===
As part of Keikyu's investment plan for fiscal 2022, withdrawals of the four-car steel-bodied sets commenced in May 2022 with the introduction of new 4-car stainless steel N1000-1890 series sets.

== Livery variations ==
From 25 February 2018, four-car set 1521 was finished in a special "Keikyu 120 years of progress" livery with each of the four cars carrying a different livery used by Keikyu trains in the past. The livery remained on the car until 24 February 2019. Car 1 carries the dark red used on 51 series EMUs from 1924 to 1965, car 2 carries the red and yellow livery used on 500 series and other trains from 1951 to 1963, car 3 carries the red livery used on 1500 series and other trains since 1953, and car 4 carries the red and white livery used on 800, N1000 and 2100 series trains since 1978.

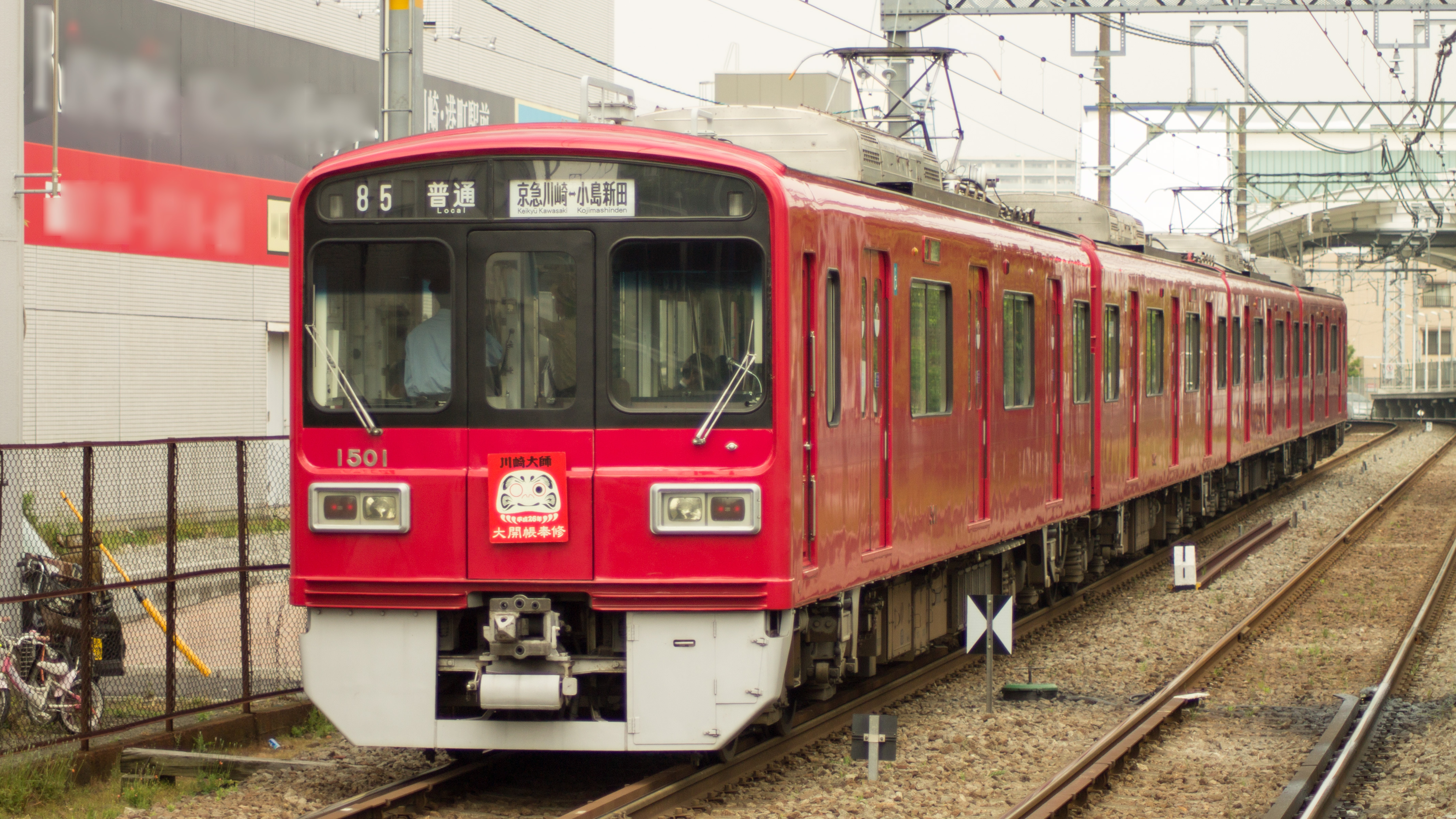
Four car set 1501 in a special Daishi Line all-over red commemorative livery in May 2014
