= Densha otaku =

Railfans in Japan

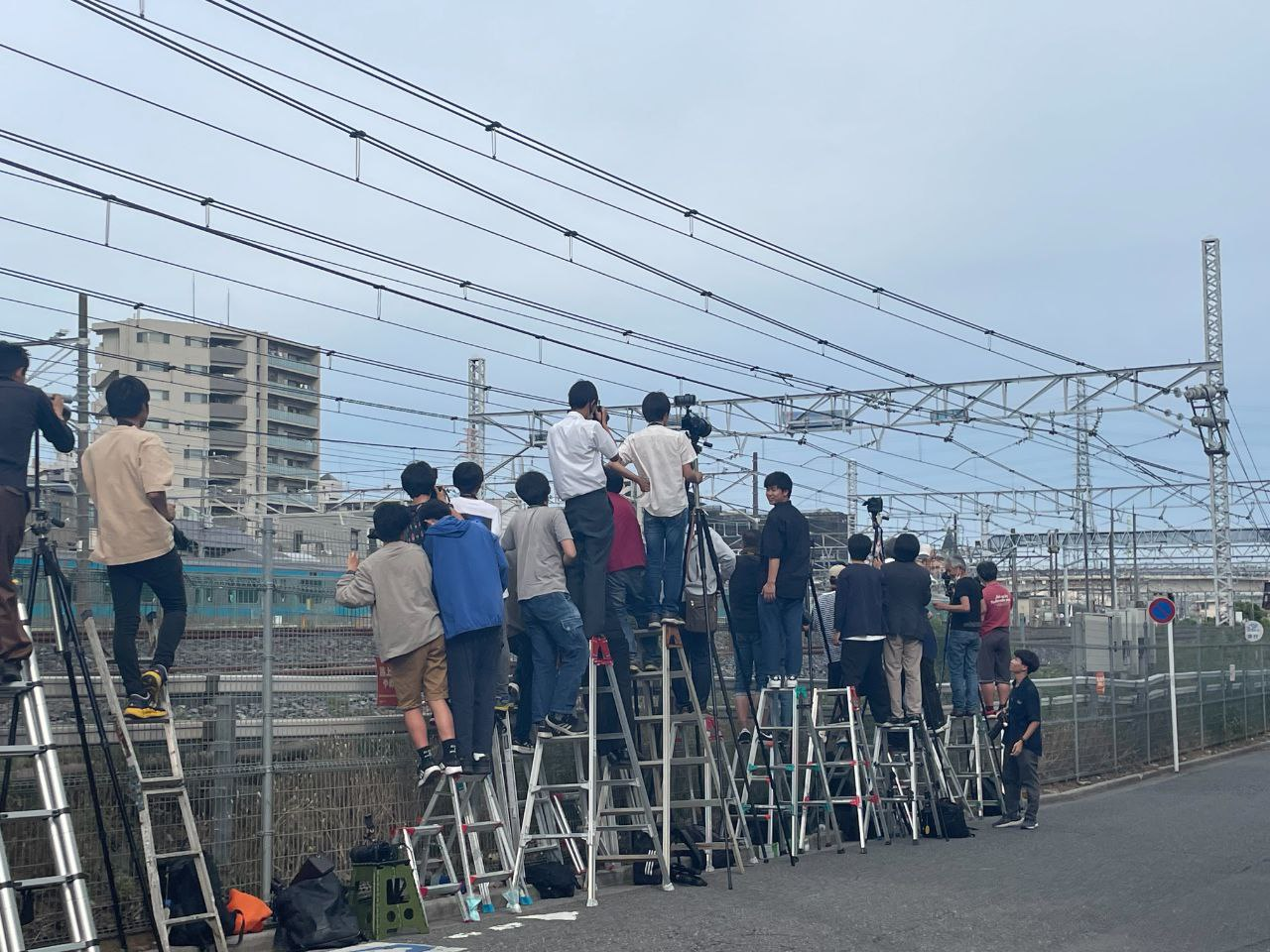
- A group of densha otaku crowd the lineside outside Minami-Urawa Station, Saitama
- Years active: late 1940s - present
- Country: Japan
- Major figures: Saya Ichikawa; Rena Matsui; Akio Nakamori; Ayako Suzukawa
- Influenced: Otaku culture

Densha otaku (Japanese: 電車オタク; lit. train otaku) are railfans in Japan who participate in a variety of activities as part of their interest in railways. Alternatively named tetsudo fan (鉄道ファン), the culture is estimated to have up to 2 million participants. Events such as the 'perfect kiss', whereby an E5 and E6 Series Shinkansen couple together on the Akita Shinkansen route at Morioka railway station, have become popular attractions drawing thousands of densha otaku.

== History ==
=== Pre-war ===
The history of railfans in Japan can be traced back to the Taishō era when children, in particular young boys, started to become interested in railways en masse. By the Shōwa era two dedicated railway magazines were being published to cater for this burgeoning interest in Japan's railways, with the first dedicated railfans magazine Railway (鉄道) established in 1929. Streamlined locomotives such as the Pashina Class which ran the Asia Express became particularly popular amongst Japanese railfans in this period. The rise in interest in railways and steam locomotives has been linked to the expansion of Empire.

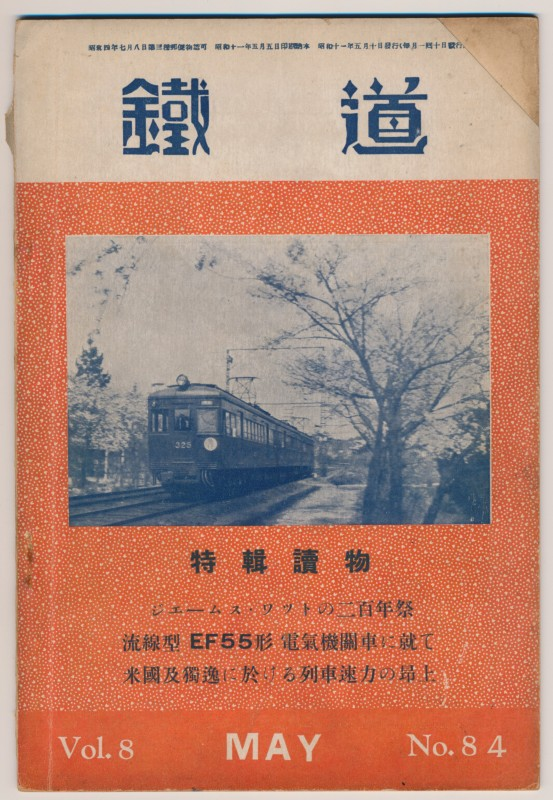
An issue of Railway magazine from 1936

=== Post-war ===
Following the Japanese defeat in World War II, with the attendant loss of empire and restrictions on the military, the country's railways became a symbol of national reconstruction. In this context post-war Japan saw the emergence of the first generation of densha otaku. Photography became a popular medium amongst Japanese railfans and, due to the introduction of Shinkansen as well as social factors such as the influence of popular science fiction novels, electric trains became increasingly popular during this period.

This period also saw the birth of the popular Japan Railfan Magazine. The Japan Railfan Club (鉄道友の会) was founded in 1953 with the intention of cultivating knowledge about the nation's railways, providing a social organisation for railfans, and promoting the hobby among the general public. Since its foundation the club has produced the RAILFAN magazine and, in 1958 and 1961 respectively, introduced the annual Blue Ribbon Award (ブルーリボン賞) and Laurel Prize (ローレル賞) The former prize came into being following the introduction of the Odakyu 3000 series SE and generally came to be awarded to express trains. To remedy this bias the latter prize was introduced for commuter trains, later coming to be awarded in recognition of exceptional design and technological features.

=== SL Boom to 1980s ===
Steam traction was phased out by Japanese National Railways in the 1970s sparking what was known as the steam locomotive boom, commonly referred to as the SL Boom (SLブーム). Densha otaku rushed to see the last of the steam locomotives documenting them on film and utilising technological advances in sound recording. School-aged railfans were known to travel long distance during holidays, sleeping on station platforms in order to photograph steam locomotives before they were withdrawn from service. 'Farewell' specials scheduled by JNR often attracted railfans and the popularity of steam locomotives during the SL Boom even led to instances of them being put back into service especially for densha otaku, such as on the Koumi Line in 1973. The cult anime series Galaxy Express 999 has also been credited with popularising steam at the time.

Since being first introduced at Shinjuku and Shibuya stations in 1989 eki-melo have become popular amongst densha otaku, with one composer Minoru Mukaiya regularly drawing large crowds to his recitals of them.

=== 1990s–present ===
The period since the late twentieth century has been termed the post-railway period by historians due to the shift in emphasis towards digital railway games and cult products among densha otaku. In the early twenty-first century railways have become increasingly popular amongst the general public leading to a rise in numbers of densha otaku. In January 2016 Chinese state broadcaster CCTV News featured a story about a rural station in Hokkaido that was remaining open for the use of a single local schoolgirl until she had finished her studies. After going viral the station in question, Kyū-Shirataki, became a popular destination for densha otaku.

== Etymology ==
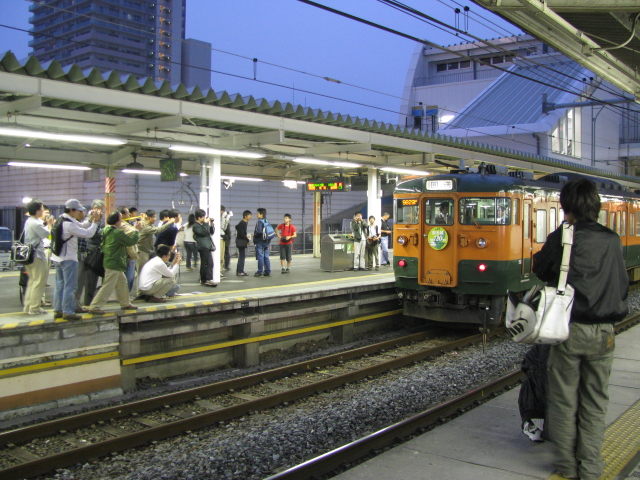
Toritetsu at Ageo Railway station, Saitama.

Writing in the magazine Manga Burikko, the cultural critic Akio Nakamori is believed to have first labelled Japanese railfans as otaku during the early 1980s. Since then the term densha otaku has come to cover a wide variety of activities related to recreational interests in locomotives, trains, and railways in Japan. Over thirty-six words to describe the differing interests of railfans in Japan have been recorded. These include toritetsu (撮り鉄) who take photographs of trains, ototetsu (音鉄) who specialise in recording train noises, and ekibentetsu (駅弁鉄) used to describe fans of railway station bento boxes. Jikokuhyо̄tetsu (時刻表鉄) is a term to used for those whose focus is on railway timetables, a mokeitetsu (模型鉄) is a railway modeller, shūshūtetsu (収集鉄) denotes an enthusiast of railway merchandise, and ekitetsu (駅鉄) are those who are knowledgeable about stations. Other terms are used in reference to the gender or social status of a railfan such as mama-tetsu (ママ鉄) to describe a mother who has become interested in railways through their child, while a child may be known as a kotestu (子鉄) or chibitetsu (ちび鉄).

== Gender ==
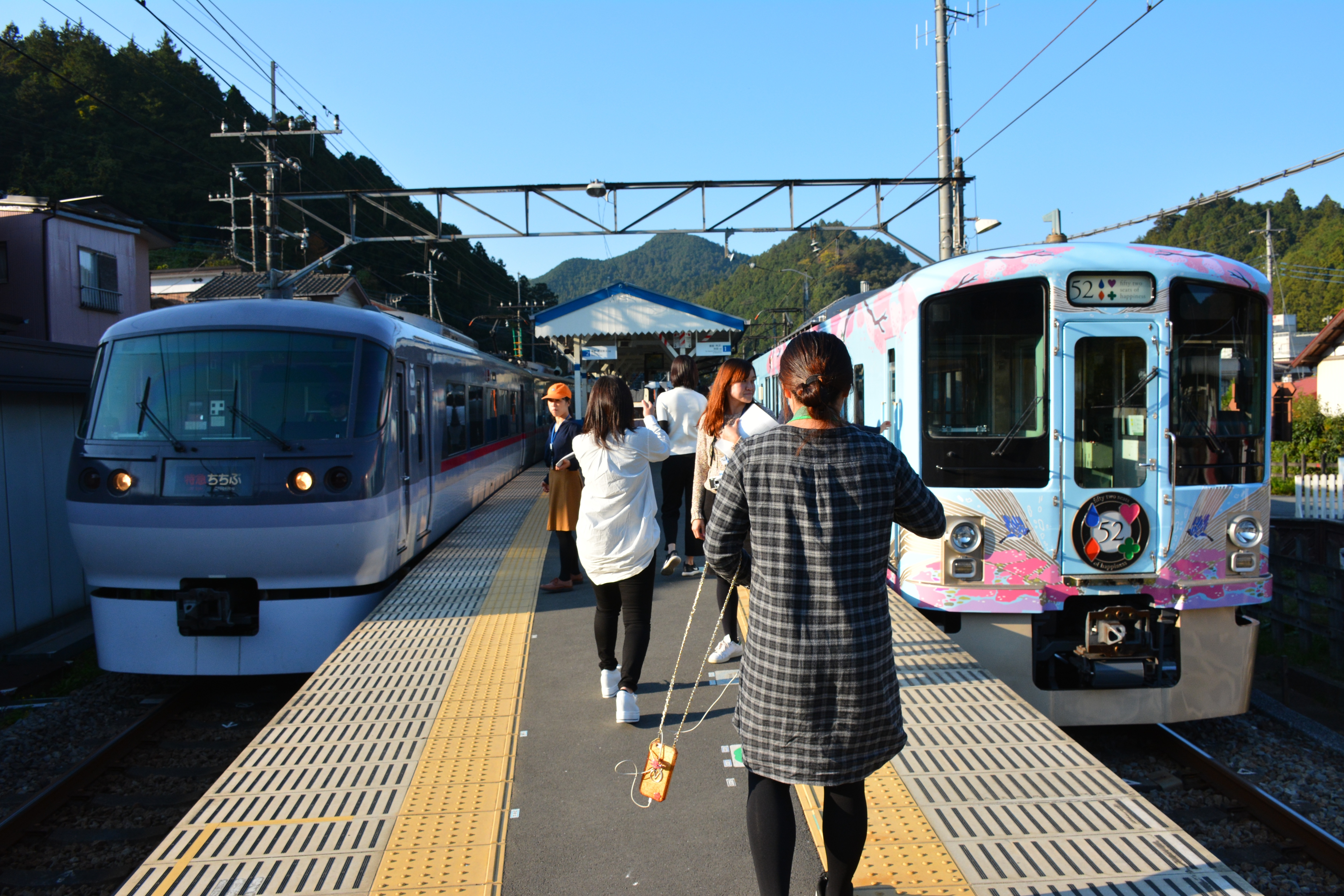
Tetsuko gather by a Seibu 10000 and 4000 series at Higashi-Agano railway station

While densha otaku has typically been regarded as a male dominated subculture, in the early twenty-first century there has been an increasing number of female railfans known as tetsuko (鉄子). This rise has been attributed the influence of the popular manga series Tetsuko no Tabi as well as the opening of the Railway Museum in 2007. By 2008 the social networking service Mixi had 300 groups dedicated to female railfans. The increase in tetsuko may also be related to social networking on the internet and the opportunity of well paid jobs on offer to female employees of Japanese railway companies. The railway transport programme Japan Railway Journal, broadcast on NHK World, has regularly featured celebrity tetsuko including tarento Saya Ichikawa and actress Rena Matsui. Other celebrities such as Rina Akiyama, who since starring in the television programme Kamen Rider Den-O narrated by Kenjirō Ishimaru, have been credited with broadening the gender appeal of the densha otaku subculture. Further influences include the railway inspired hip-hop group Super Bell"Z who, in 2002, used recordings of the Yamanote Line in a track which became popular among female railfans in Japan.

In 2018 it was reported that a tetsuko had uncovered her partner's infidelity after recognising the sound of a specific type of locomotive in the background of a phone call between the pair.

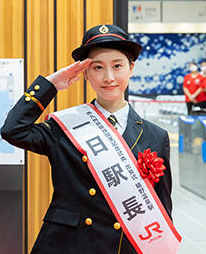
Rena Matsui in a station manager's uniform at the opening of JR Kyushu's Nishi Kyushu Shinkansen line in September 2022

== Marketing ==
As the densha otaku subculture has grown in popularity, it has also become a commercial opportunity. In 2015 thousands of railfans were reported to have had a positive impact on the local economy when they gathered to watch a test run of a steam locomotive in Wakasa. In 2017 the city of Kudamatsu publicised the route a newly built Class 800 would take through the town on its way to be shipped to the United Kingdom in order to attract densha otaku tourists to the area. Following the success of the initiative a similar transport of JR West Shinkansen rolling stock into Hakata Port was advertised on social media.

In 2021 JR East launched Mechu, a subscription based social media platform styled on Twitch, for densha otaku aimed at capitalising on the increasing popularity of the subculture. In 2022 the company released a calendar using train photography that had been uploaded to Mechu by subscribers.

The Densha Otaku app is a mobile phone application released in January 2022 designed for railfans to follow railway journeys in real time.

== Nuisance behaviour and crime ==
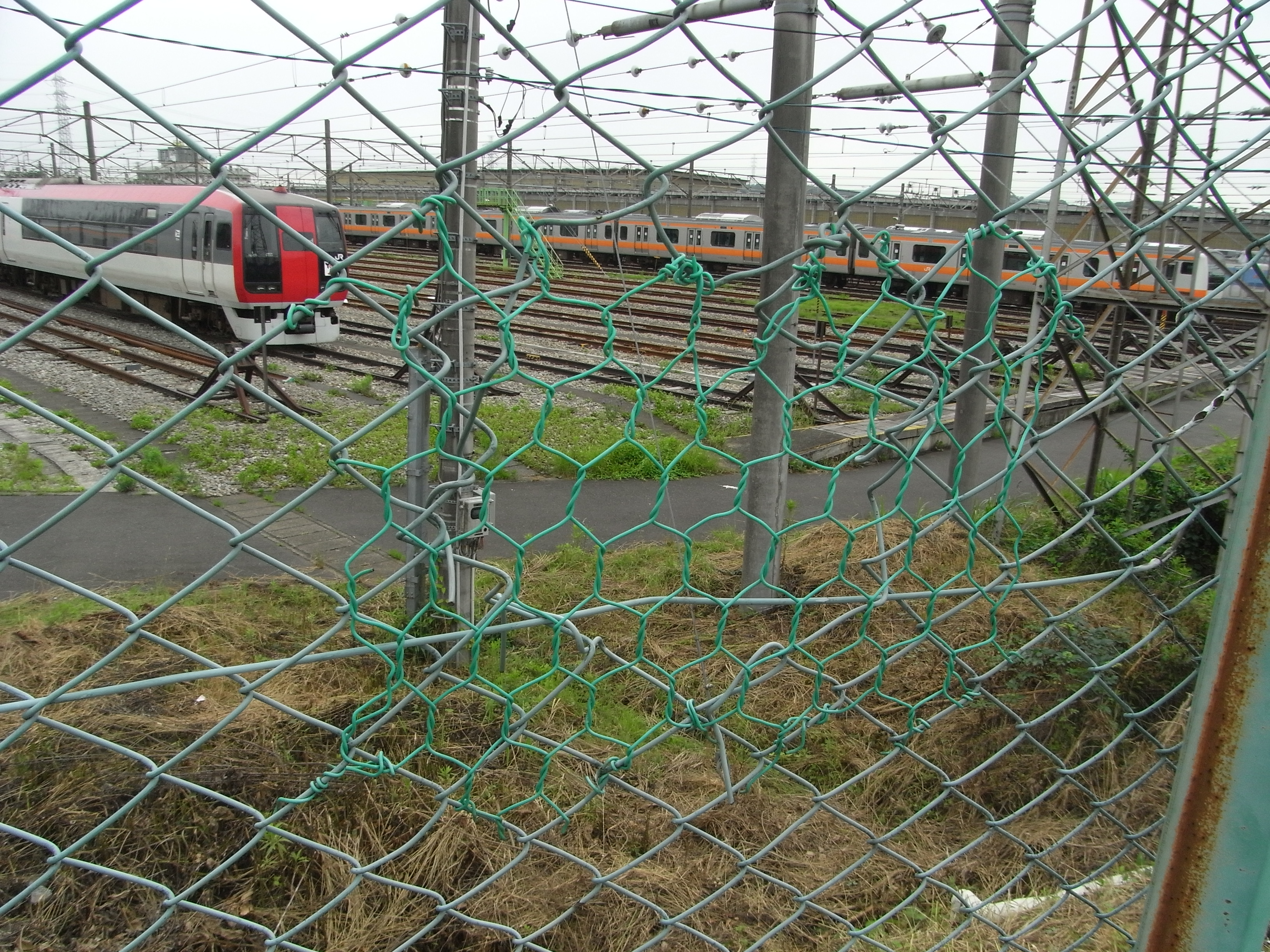
A JR East fence which has been damaged by toritetsu cutting holes in it, Hino 2010

Densha otaku have had some association with nuisance behaviour since the period of the SL Boom. The author Ryozo Kawashima has noted that a campaign was launched in the mid-1970s in an attempt to improve the behaviour of such unruly railfans.

In February 2010 a train operating on the Biwako Line was forced to make an emergency stop because of a trespass incident involving a toritetsu, while in June of that year another railfan was arrested on charges related to trespass on the railways. In a 2015 article the Tokyo weekly magazine Shukan Shincho compared the behaviour of contemporary Japanese toritetsu to that of football hooligans in Europe.

In March 2015 two young railfans were apprehended by police in Tokyo after stealing equipment from a Tōkaidō Main Line train. In 2018 a tetsuko received a prison sentence after entering the cab of a train in operation on the Jōban Line and stealing equipment. Those participating in the theft of railway property, such as locomotive numberplates, have been dubbed tori-tetsu (取り鉄 as opposed to 撮り鉄).

In April 2021 a violent altercation between two toritetsu taking pictures of a specially scheduled train at Nishi-Kawaguchi railway station resulted in a victim acquiring a fractured skull and the subsequent arrest of a teenage suspect two days later. Following the incident an editorial in the Yomiuri Shimbun focused on the behaviour of toritetsu, noting that since 2018 Tokyo Metro had stopped publicising withdrawals of rolling stock in order to avoid trouble, while the Japan Railfan Club had issued an appeal to its own members to help deal with nuisance behaviour. In December of that year the Tokyo Metropolitan Police Department arrested three toritetsu who were accused of organising thefts from stores in Adachi to the value of ¥55,000.

In January and June 2023 trespassing incidents involving densha otaku occurred in Numazu and Yaita respectively, the latter forcing a train on the Utsunomiya Line to make an emergency stop. In June 2023 in response to residents' complaints against toritetsu gathering in Hino to photograph the Yakumo train, JR West enacted patrols of the area alongside local police. Due to a similar situation arising in Tsuwano local authorities opened a designated area for densha otaku alongside the Yamaguchi Line.

On November 13, 2023, a densha otaku made an arson threat to JR East on a social networking service. Following the incident, he was arrested by the police.

== See also ==
- Railfan
- Trainspotters in the United Kingdom
