= Keikyu 600 series =

Japanese train type

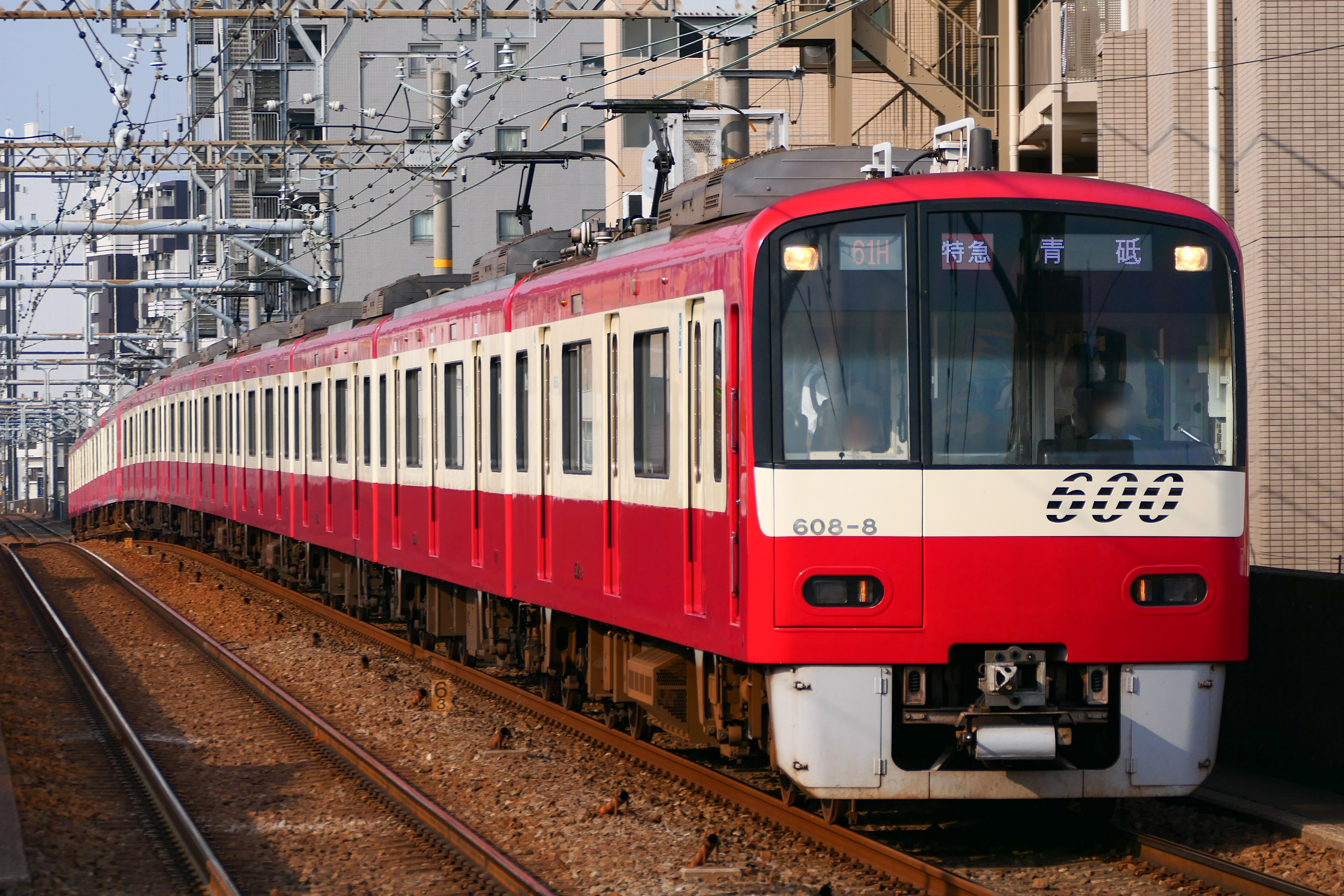
- Set 608 in July 2023
- In service: 1994–present
- Manufacturers: Tokyu Car Corporation, Kawasaki Heavy Industries
- Replaced: 1000 series
- Entered service: 1994
- Refurbished: 2009–2014
- Number built: 88 vehicles (14 sets)
- Number in service: 88 vehicles (14 sets)
- Formation: 4/8 cars per trainset
- Fleet numbers: 601–608 (8-car sets); 651–656 (4-car sets)
- Operator: Keikyu
- Lines served: Keikyu Main Line; Keikyu Daishi Line; Toei Asakusa Line; Keisei Main Line; Keisei Oshiage Line; Hokuso Line; Narita Sky Access Line

Specifications
- Car body construction: Aluminium
- Car length: 18,000 mm (59 ft 1 in)
- Width: 2,830 mm (9 ft 3 in)
- Doors: 3 pairs per side
- Maximum speed: 120 km/h (75 mph)
- Traction system: Variable frequency (GTO)
- Electric systems: Overhead line, 1,500 V DC
- Current collection: Pantograph
- Track gauge: 1,435 mm (4 ft 8 1/2 in)

The Keikyu 600 series (京急600形) is an electric multiple unit (EMU) train type operated by the private railway operator Keikyu on commuter services in the Tokyo area of Japan. First introduced in 1994, a total of eight 8-car sets and six 4-car sets were built by Tokyu Car Corporation and Kawasaki Heavy Industries to replace the ageing 1000 series sets on limited express services.

== Operations ==
The 600 series is primarily operated on the Keikyu Main Line. They are also used on inter-running services to the Toei Asakusa Line, Keisei Main Line, Hokuso Line, and the Narita Sky Access Line. Four-car sets are occasionally used on the Keikyu Daishi Line.

== Formations ==
As of 1 April 2016, the fleet consists of eight 8-car sets and six 4-car sets (classified 650 series).

=== 8-car sets ===
The eight-car sets 601 to 607 are formed as follows, with six motored (M) cars and two trailer (T) cars.

Designation	M1c	M2	Tu	Ts	M1'	M2	M1	M2c
Numbering	60x-1	60x-2	60x-3	60x-4	60x-5	60x-6	60x-7	60x-8

- The "x" in the car numbers corresponds to the set number.
- The "M1c" and "M1" cars are each fitted with one lozenge-type pantograph, and the "M1'" car is fitted with two pantographs.

The eight-car set 608 is formed as follows, with four motored (M) cars and four trailer (T) cars.

Designation	Muc	T	Tp1	Mu	Ms	T	Tp1	Msc
Numbering	608-1	608-2	608-3	608-4	608-5	608-6	608-7	608-8

The two "Tp1" cars are each fitted with two single-arm pantographs.

=== 4-car sets ===
The four-car sets are formed as follows, with two motored (M) cars and two trailer (T) cars.

Designation	Muc	T	Tp2	Msc
Numbering	65x-1	65x-2	65x-3	65x-4

The "Tp2" car is fitted with two single-arm pantographs.

== Interior ==
The first batch of sets introduced featured transverse seating bays throughout. While most of the seating was fixed, some seats were partially retractable. Later sets featured longitudinal seating. From 2004, the earlier sets were modified with some transverse seating bays replaced by longitudinal seats.

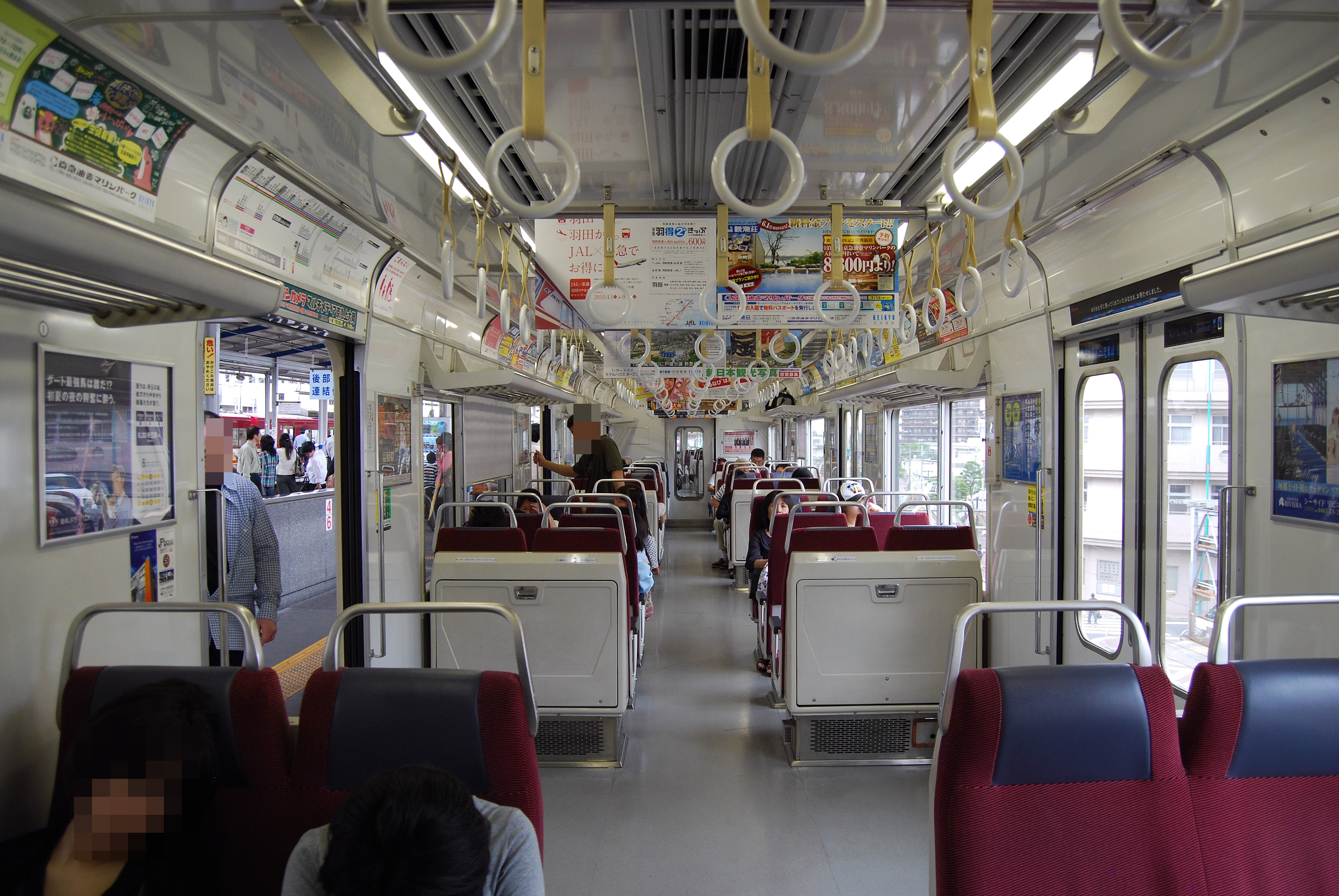
Interior view showing transverse seating in September 2010

Interior view showing longitudinal seating in December 2021

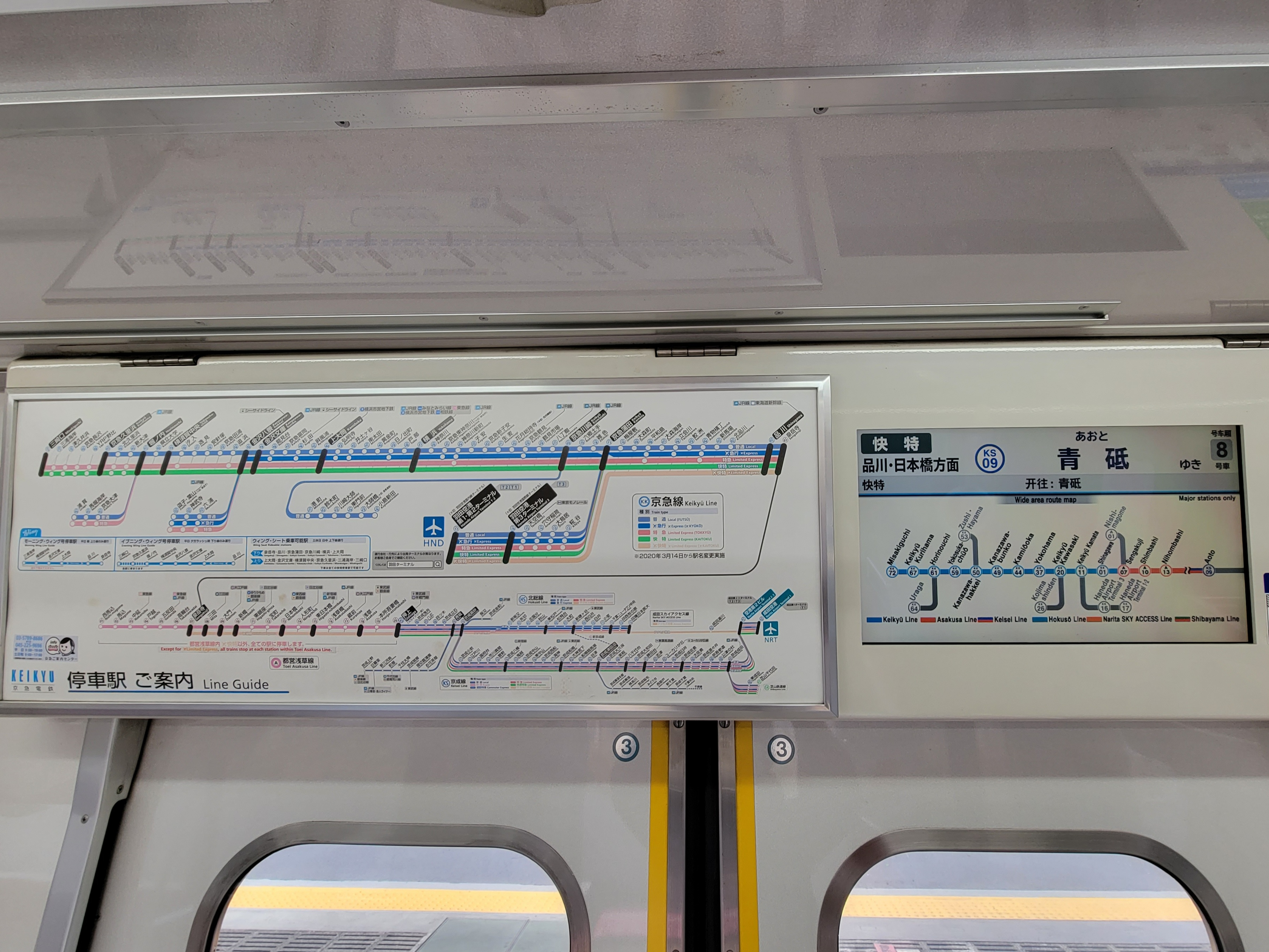
LCD passenger information display

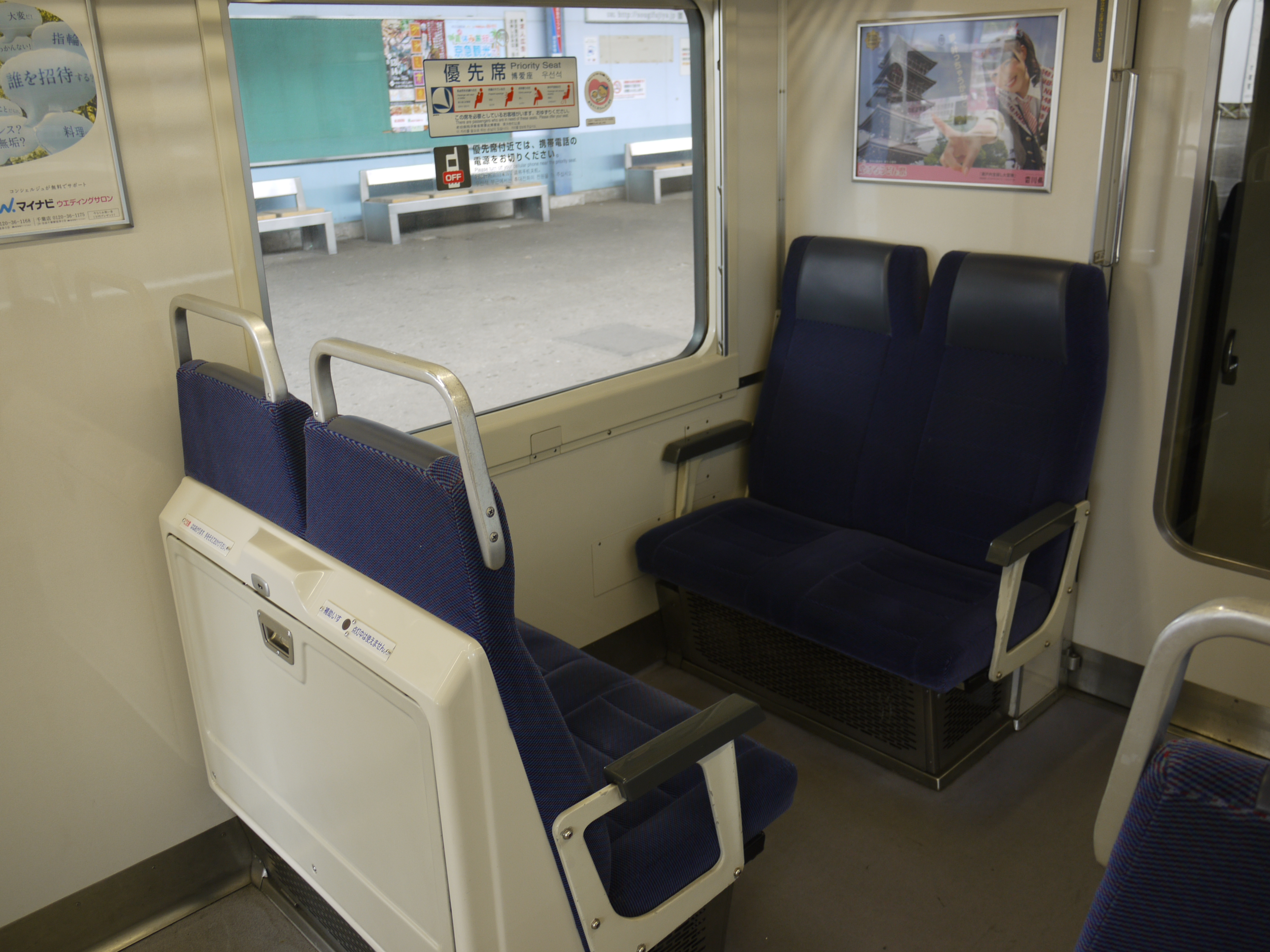
Priority seating, August 2014

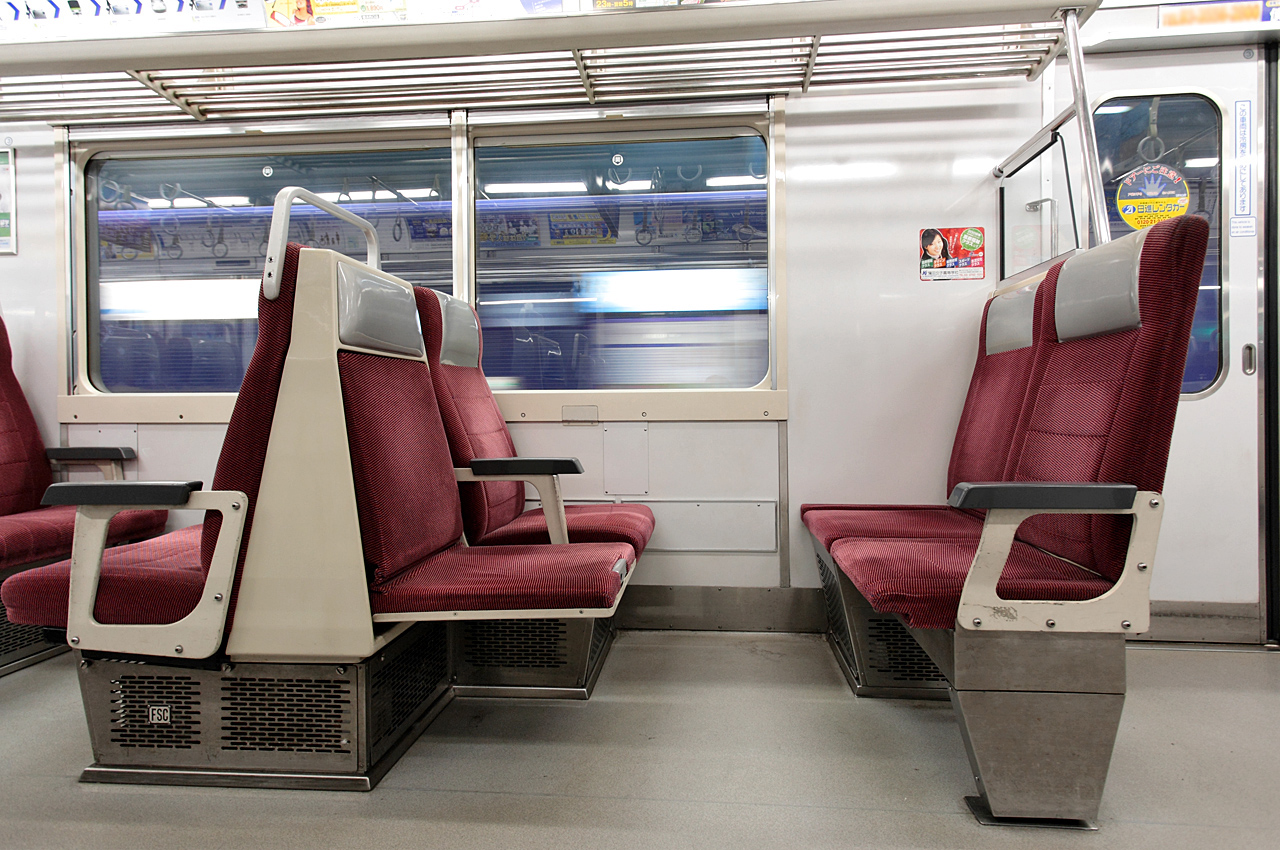
Retractable "Twin-gle" seat (left)

== Liveries ==
Set 606 received a special "Blue Sky Train" livery in March 2005 to commemorate the opening of Haneda Airport Terminal 2.

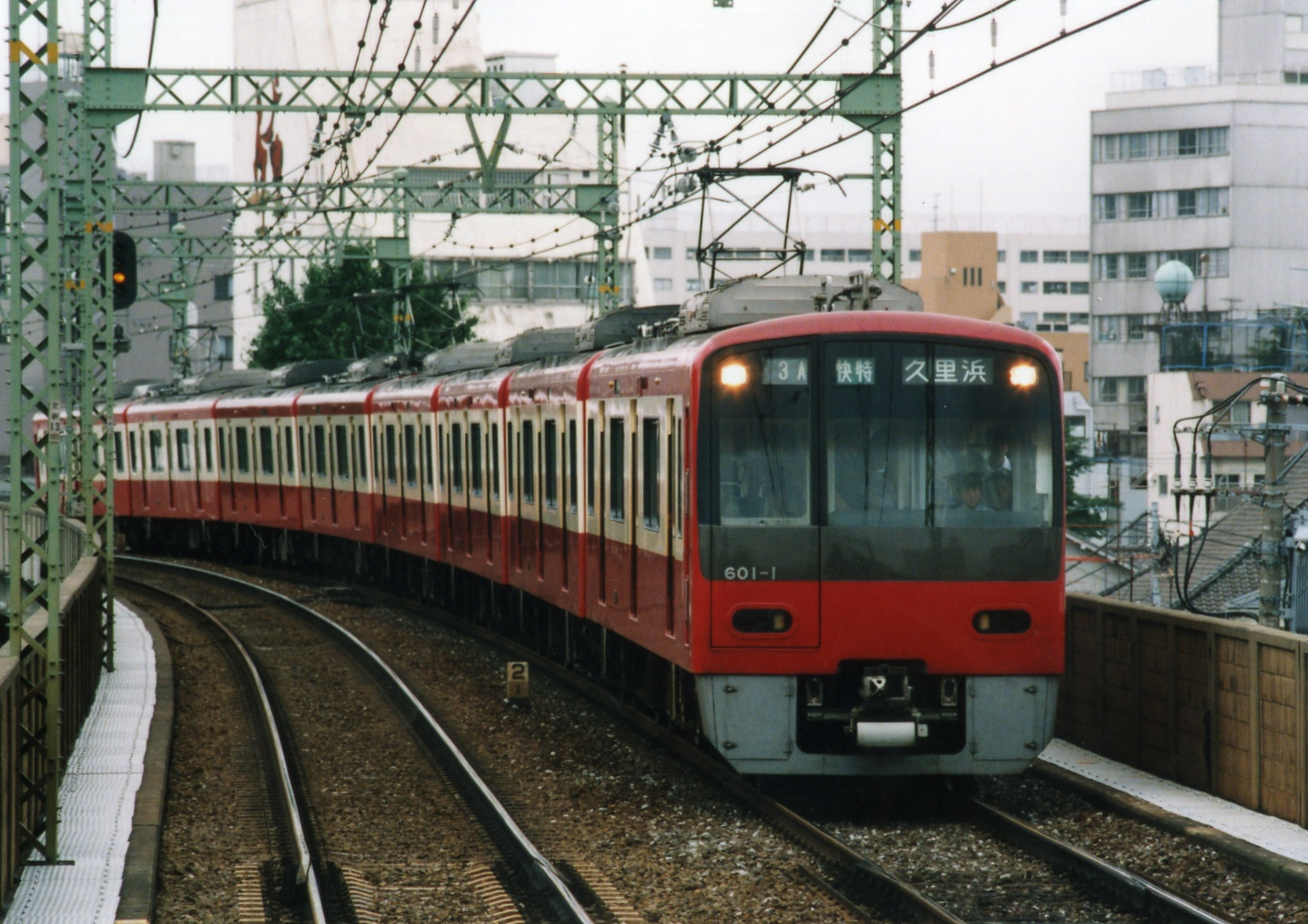
Set 601 in original colour scheme in July 1995

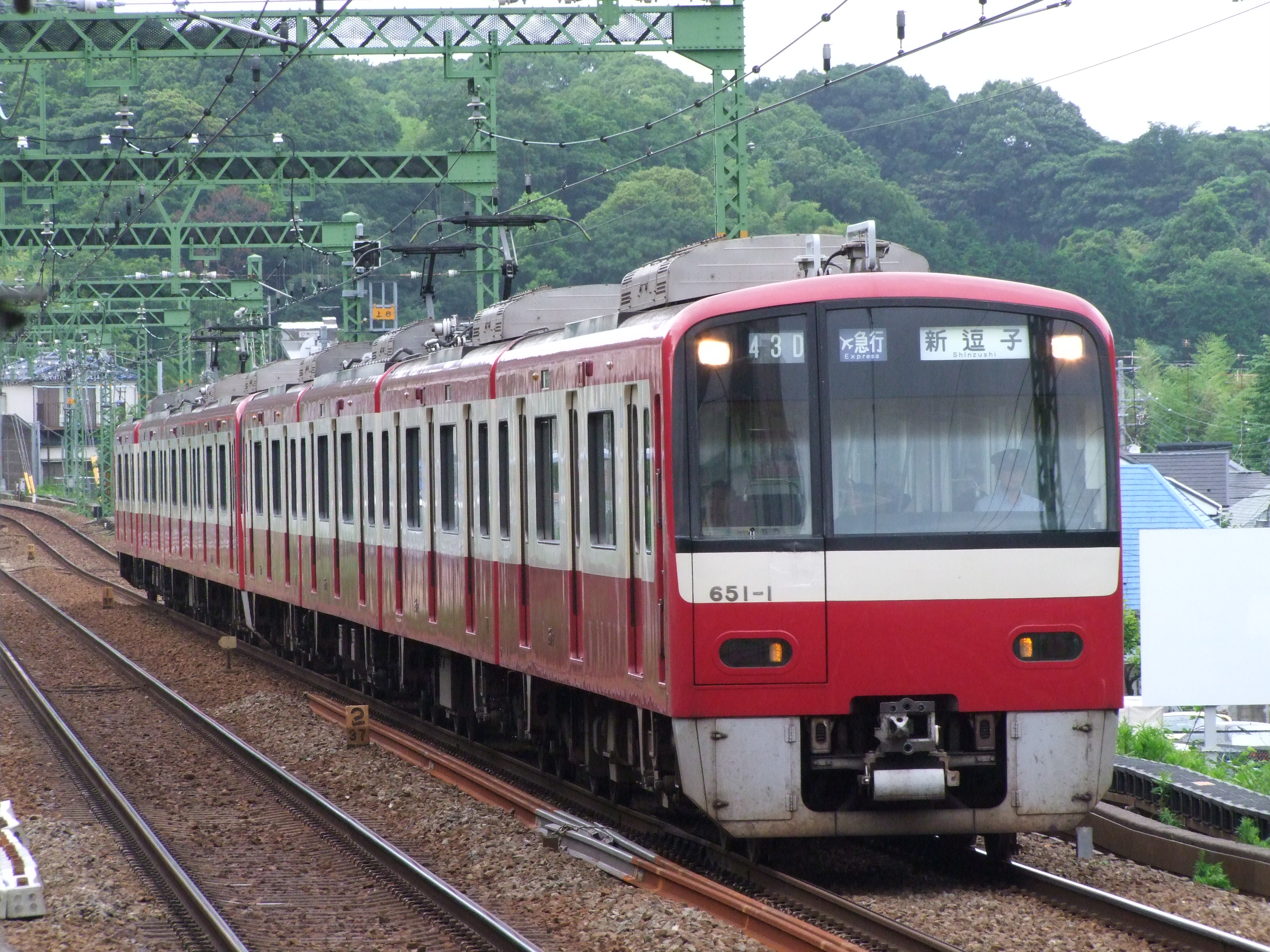
Set 651 in later livery in June 2010

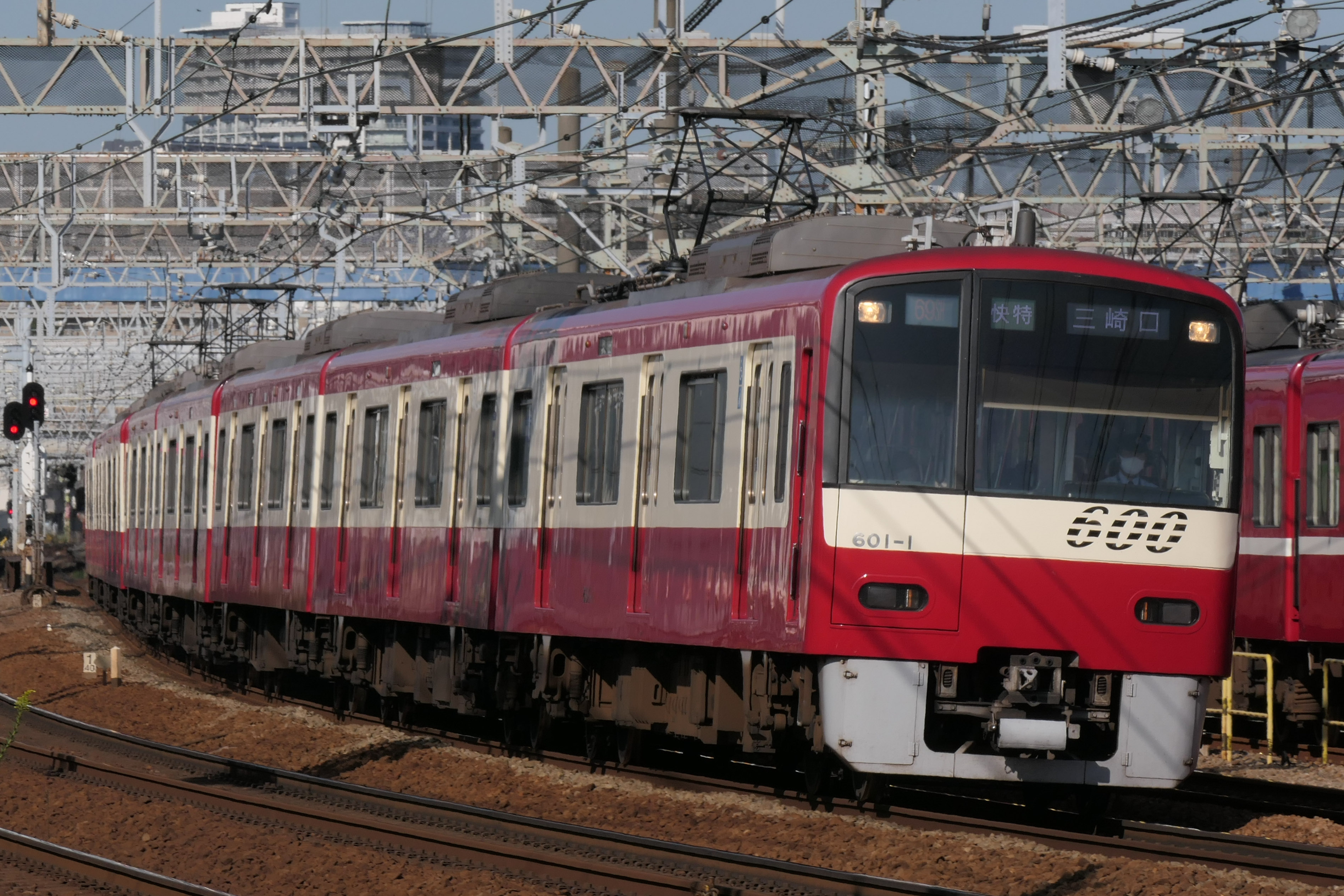
Refurbished set 601 in October 2020

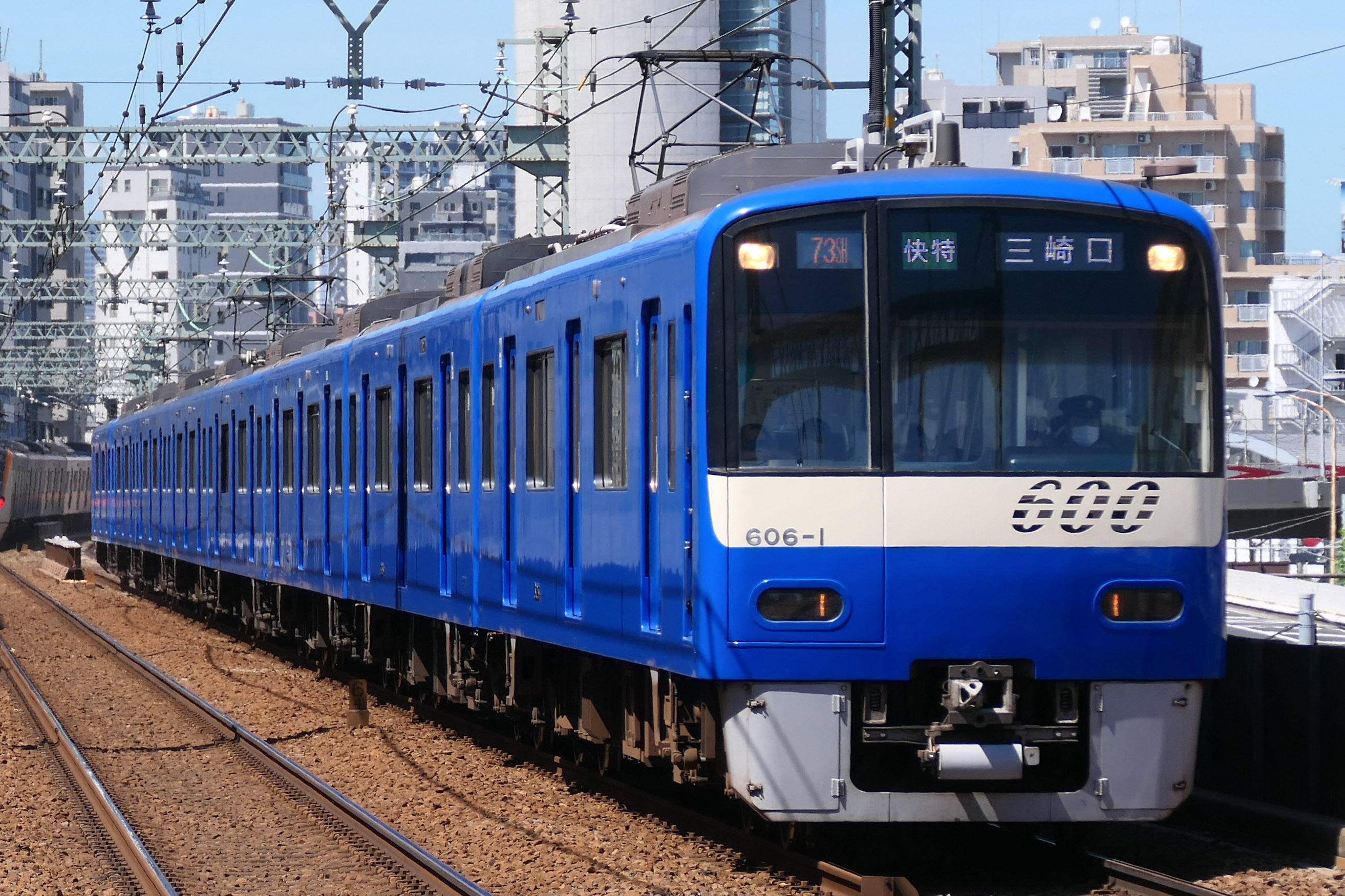
Set 606 in "Blue Sky Train" livery in July 2021

== Refurbishment ==
The 600 series underwent refurbishment from August 2009 to March 2014. Modifications included were replacing the wiper cover with a slit of the model number (similar to those found on the 2100 series and N1000 series), narrower front-end skirts, LED side lights, and a pair of LCD information screens above the doorways.
