= Ayako Suzukawa =

Japanese YouTuber and densha otaku

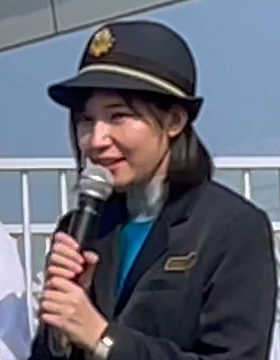
- Suzukawa at the 22nd Takamatsu-Kotohira Electric Railroad festival, 2023
- Born: 25 March 1991 (age 35); Yatsu, Narashino, Chiba Prefecture
- Education: Tokai University; Yoshimoto New Star Creation
- Occupation: YouTuber

YouTube information
- Channel: SuzukawaAyako
- Years active: 2010-present
- Genre: Railways
- Subscribers: 1.2 million
- Views: 2,230,953,494
- Last updated: 21 September 2026

Ayako Suzukawa (born 25 March 1991 in Yatsu, Narashino) is a YouTuber and comedian primarily known for her interest in railways. Suzukawa has been described as something of a densha otaku extraordinaire, combining various facets of railway enthusiasm in posts on her various social media platforms.

== Biography ==
Suzukawa first started streaming videos on the Nico Nico Douga video sharing service as a university student. She then began her professional career as part of the K2 comedy duo. In 2013 Suzukawa started a YouTube channel in which she recorded herself dancing to the song Koi Suru Fortune Cookie by AKB48 at all of the Keikyu railway stations. In March 2015 Suzukawa announced that K2 had disbanded due to professional differences, and she would continue her career as a solo comedian.

On the occasion of the 10 anniversary of the Tōhoku earthquake and tsunami Suzukawa produced a video in which she took the Jōban Line to the Hamadōri region to report on the lives of people who the 2011 earthquake had effected.

Suzukawa has made various television appearances, including as a guest on the TV Asahi comedy show Ametalk!

== Personal life ==
Suzukawa is a self described densha otaku. Her favourite train model is the N1000 series electric multiple unit that runs on the Keikyū Main Line. She is a fan of Karuta and, as a student, was ranked amongst the top 5 table tennis players in Japan. Suzukawa has two children who are named after the Hitachi and Tokiwa trains.
