= Keikyu 2100 series =

Japanese train type

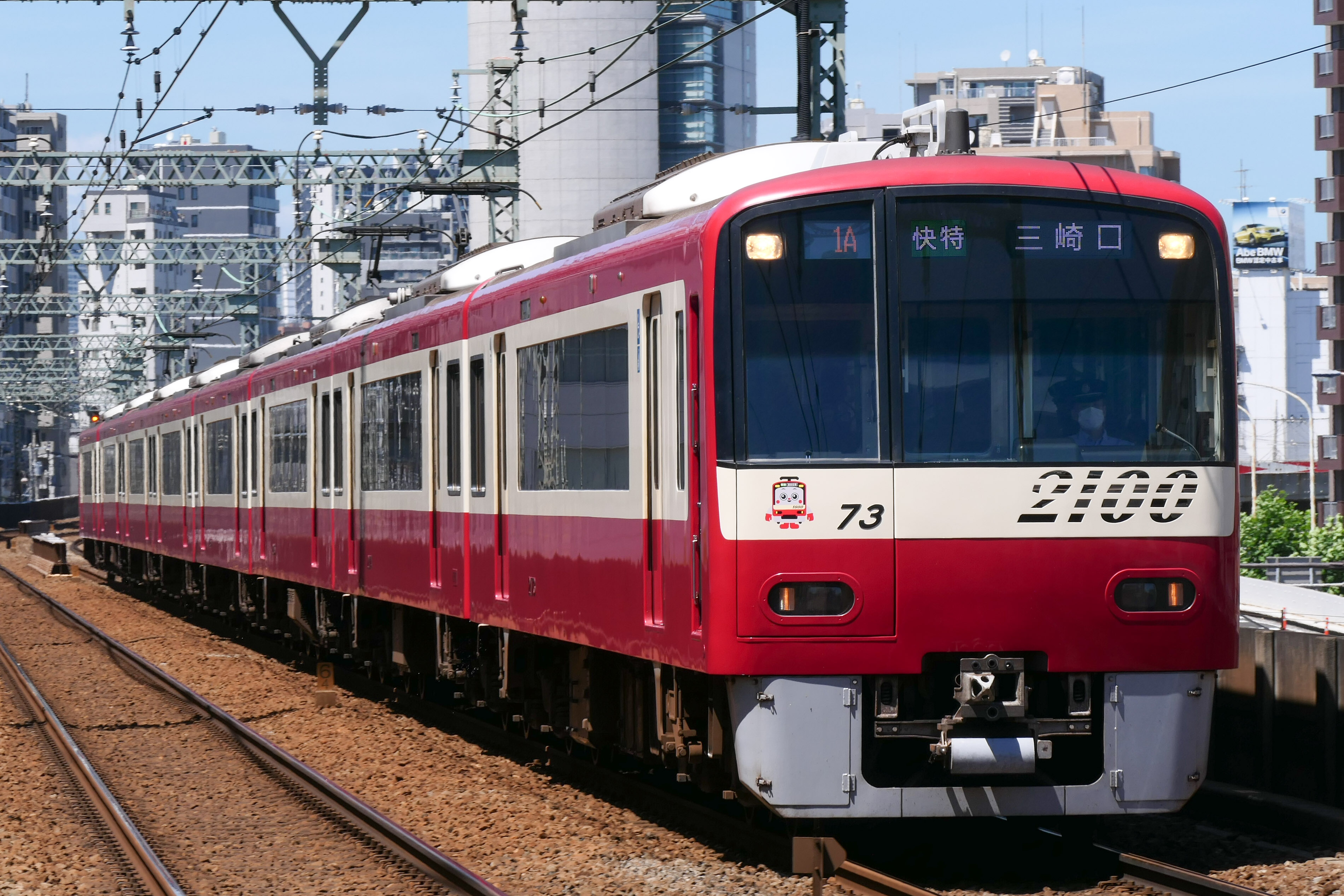
- Set 2173 in July 2021
- Manufacturers: Kawasaki Heavy Industries (Kobe) and Tokyu Car (Yokohama)
- Replaced: Keikyu 2000 series
- Entered service: 28 March 1998
- Refurbished: 2013–2016
- Number built: 80 vehicles (10 sets)
- Number in service: 80 vehicles (10 sets)
- Formation: 8 cars per trainset
- Fleet numbers: 2101–2173
- Capacity: 942 passengers
- Operator: Keikyu
- Lines served: Keikyu Main Line; Keikyu Airport Line; Keikyu Kurihama Line; Toei Asakusa Line

Specifications
- Car body construction: Aluminium
- Car length: 18 m (59 ft 1 in) (intermediate cars); 18.17 m (59 ft 7 in) (end cars)
- Width: 2.83 m (9 ft 3 in)
- Maximum speed: 120 km/h (75 mph) (service); 130 km/h (80 mph) (design)
- Traction system: Original: GTO–VVVF (Siemens); Current: IGBT–VVVF (Toyo Denki)
- Traction motors: 3-phase AC induction motor
- Power output: 190 kW (250 hp) per motor
- Acceleration: 3.5 km/(h⋅s) (2.2 mph/s)
- Deceleration: 4.0 km/(h⋅s) (2.5 mph/s) (service); 4.5 km/(h⋅s) (2.8 mph/s) (emergency)
- Electric systems: 1,500 V DC (nominal) from overhead catenary
- Current collection: Pantograph
- Track gauge: 1,435 mm (4 ft 8 1/2 in)

The Keikyu 2100 series (京急2100形) is a DC electric multiple unit (EMU) train type operated by the private railway operator Keikyu in the Tokyo area of Japan since 1998. It replaced the earlier 2000 series on limited-stop Limited Express (快特, Kaitoku) reserved seat services. A total of 10 8-car sets were built by Kawasaki Heavy Industries and Tokyu Car, and the first sets entered service on 28 March 1998.

== Service ==
The 2100 series are mainly used on limited-stop Limited Express (快特, Kaitoku) service on the Main Line and Kurihama Line. Some trains also run on part of the Asakusa Line, stopping at Sengakuji Station only.

== AC traction motor system ==
Running sound of the 2100 series, July 1999. The GTO-VVVF system can be heard 28 seconds in.

The 2100 series was Japan's first standard-gauge train to use a Siemens-supplied GTO-VVVF propulsion system. The system's ability to produce a solfège scale when accelerating became emblematic of the 2100 series when it was introduced, earning it the "singing train" (歌う電車; utau densha) nickname. Subsequently, similar propulsion was also installed on 56 N1000 series cars. The uniqueness of this propulsion system made its way into various music and popular culture, an example being Super Bell"Z.

Due to the unavailability of substitute parts for the train's GTO-VVVF system, it was eventually replaced with a new inverter, which does not have a solfège scale. By March 2015, all of the original Siemens-supplied GTO-VVVF traction systems used on the 2100 series were replaced with new IGBT-VVVF traction systems manufactured by Toyo Denki. By July 2021, all Siemens-supplied GTO-VVVF traction systems in Japan had been phased out.

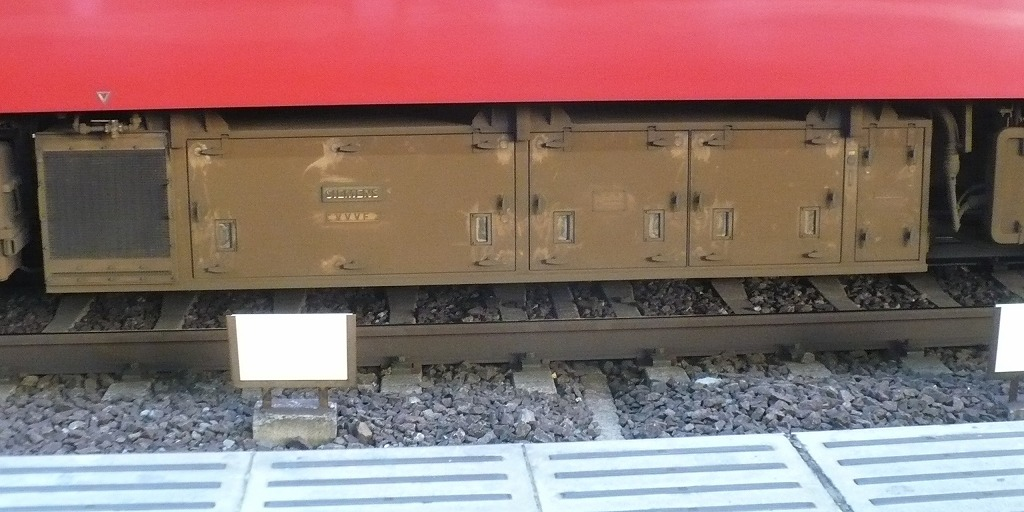
Original GTO-VVVF motor driver (Siemens G1430 D1130/560 M5-1)

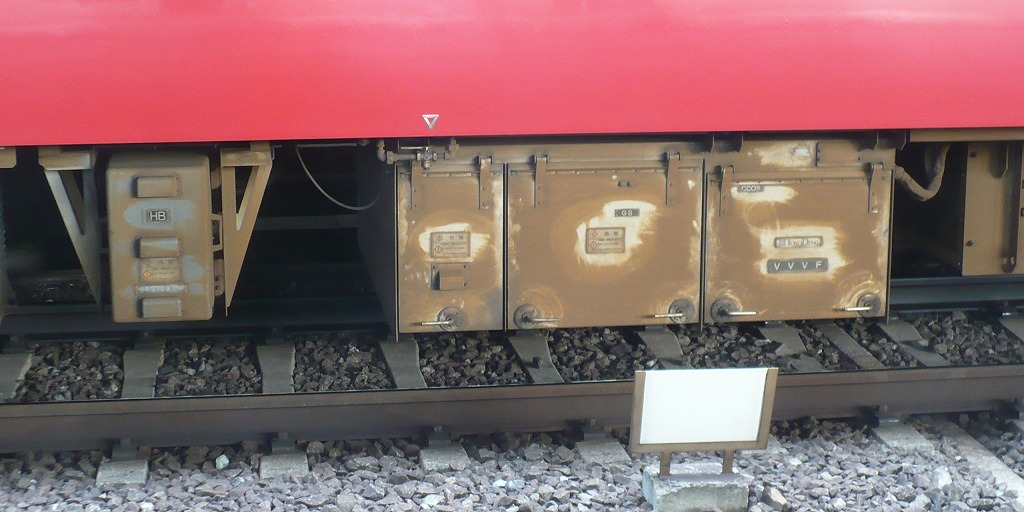
IGBT-VVVF motor driver with which the 2100 series trains were retrofitted (Toyo Denki RG6008-A-M)

== Formation ==
As of 1 April 2016, ten eight-car sets are in operation, formed as follows, with four motored (M) cars and four trailer (T) cars, and car 1 at the Misakiguchi end.

| | ← Uraga | | | | | | | |
| Car No. | 1 | 2 | 3 | 4 | 5 | 6 | 7 | 8 |
| Designation | Muc | T | Tp | Mu | Ms | T | Tp | Msc |
| Numbering | 21xx | | | | | | | |

The two "Tp" cars are each fitted with two single-arm pantographs.

== Interior ==
Passenger accommodation consists of transverse seating arranged 2+2 abreast, with seat backs that can be flipped to face the direction of travel. The windows on the 2100 series are double-glazed, with curtains.

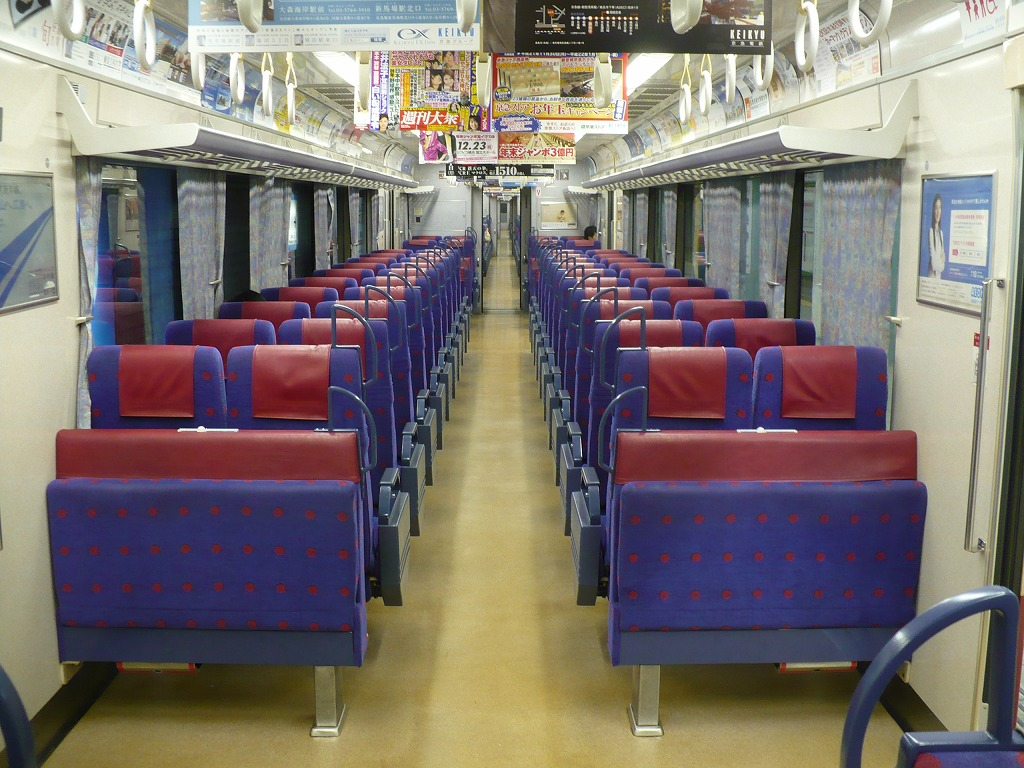
Interior view

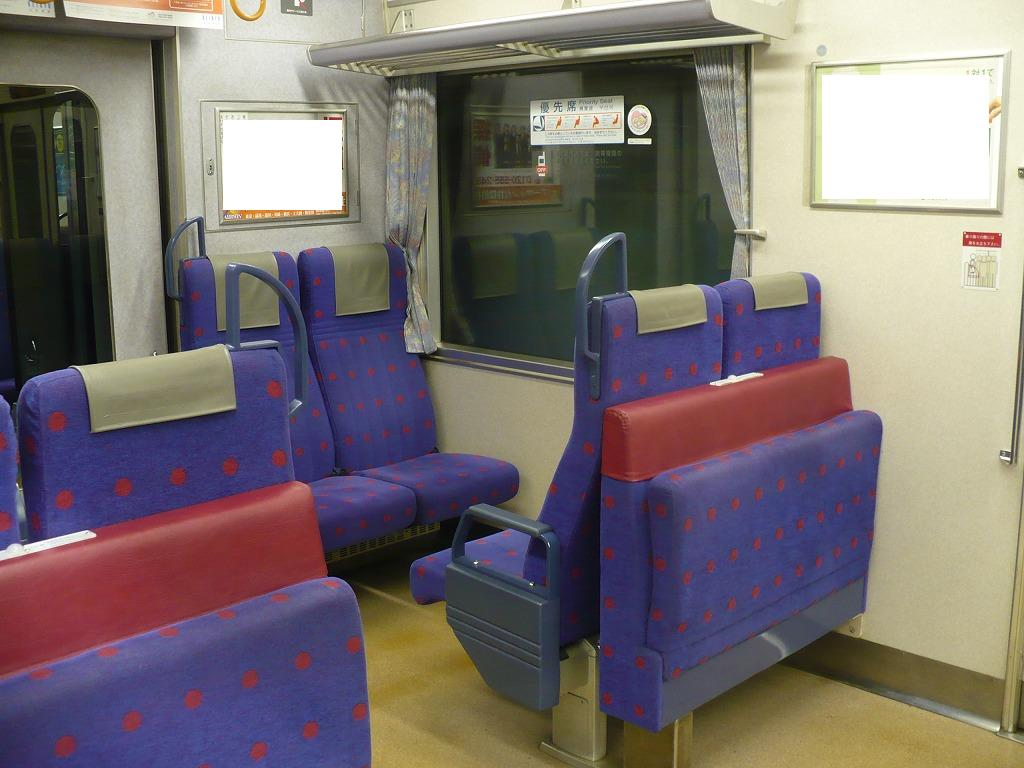
Fixed seating

== Refurbishment ==
Set 2101 was the first 2100 series set to undergo refurbishment in 2013. Modifications include replacing the passenger windows at the ends of each car with opening windows, replacing the curtains on these windows with roller blinds, replacing the original fluorescent tube lighting with LED lighting, and the installation of door chimes as well as a single LCD passenger information screen above the doors.

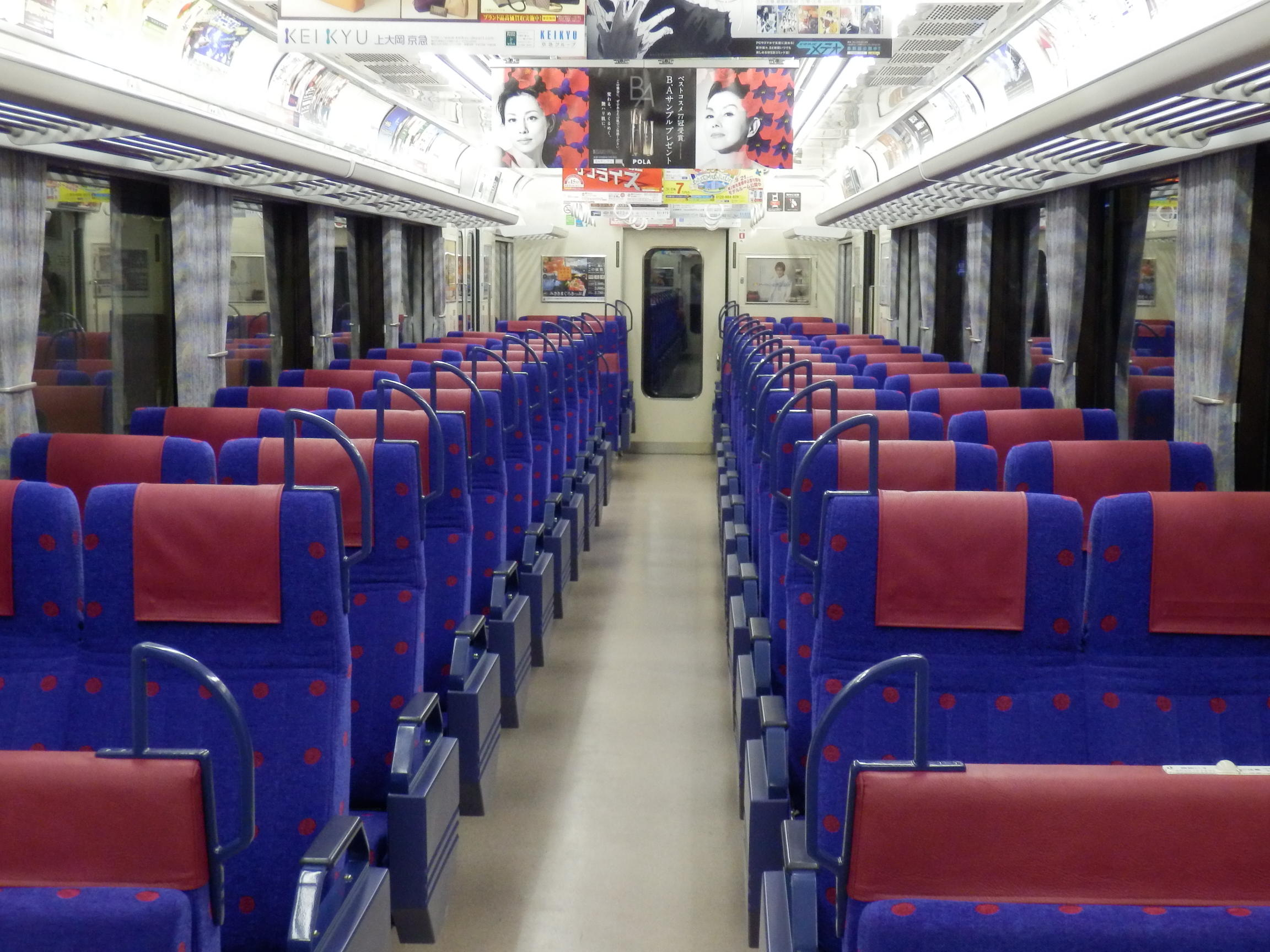
Interior view of a refurbished set, 2013

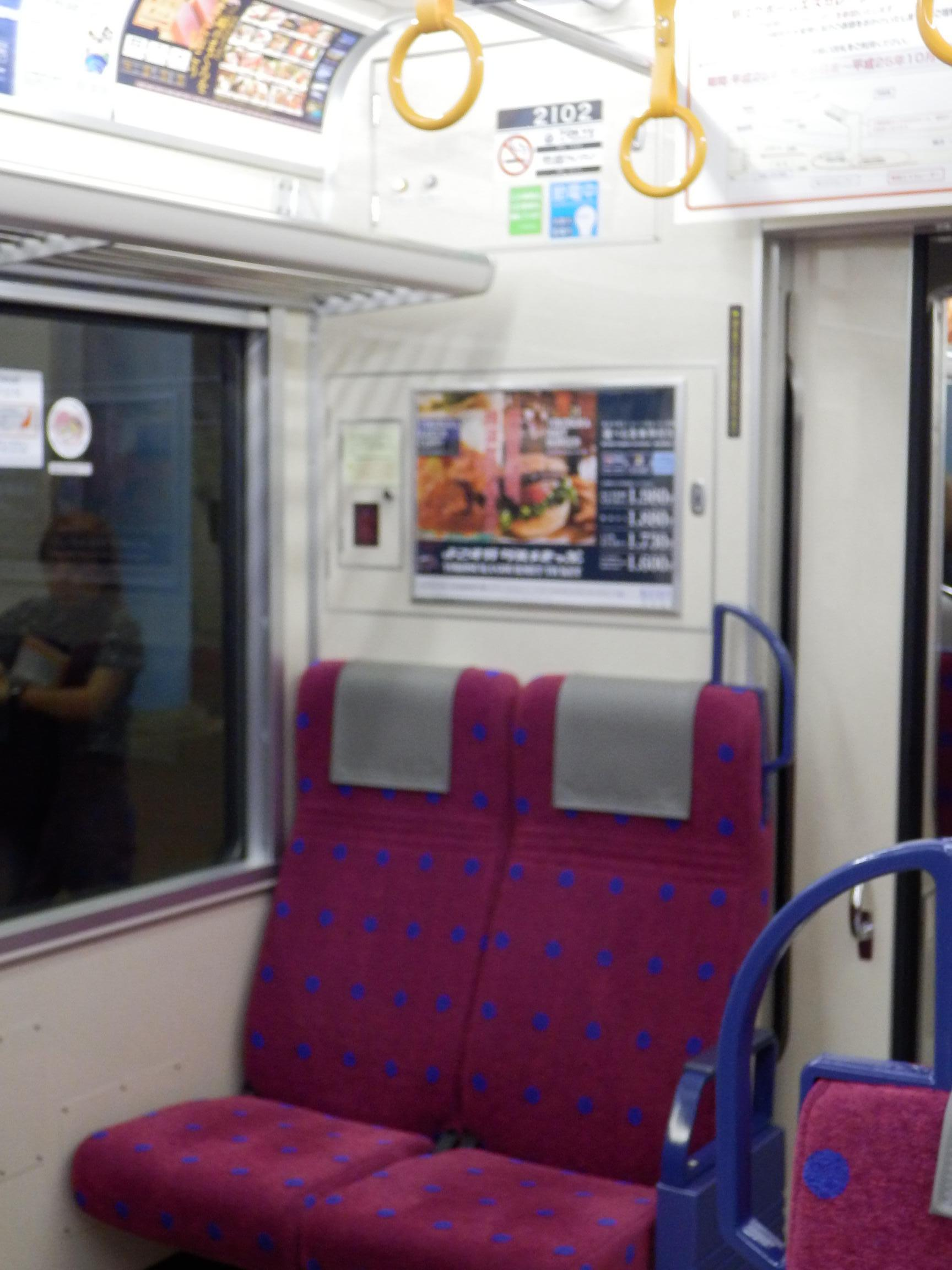
Updated priority seating

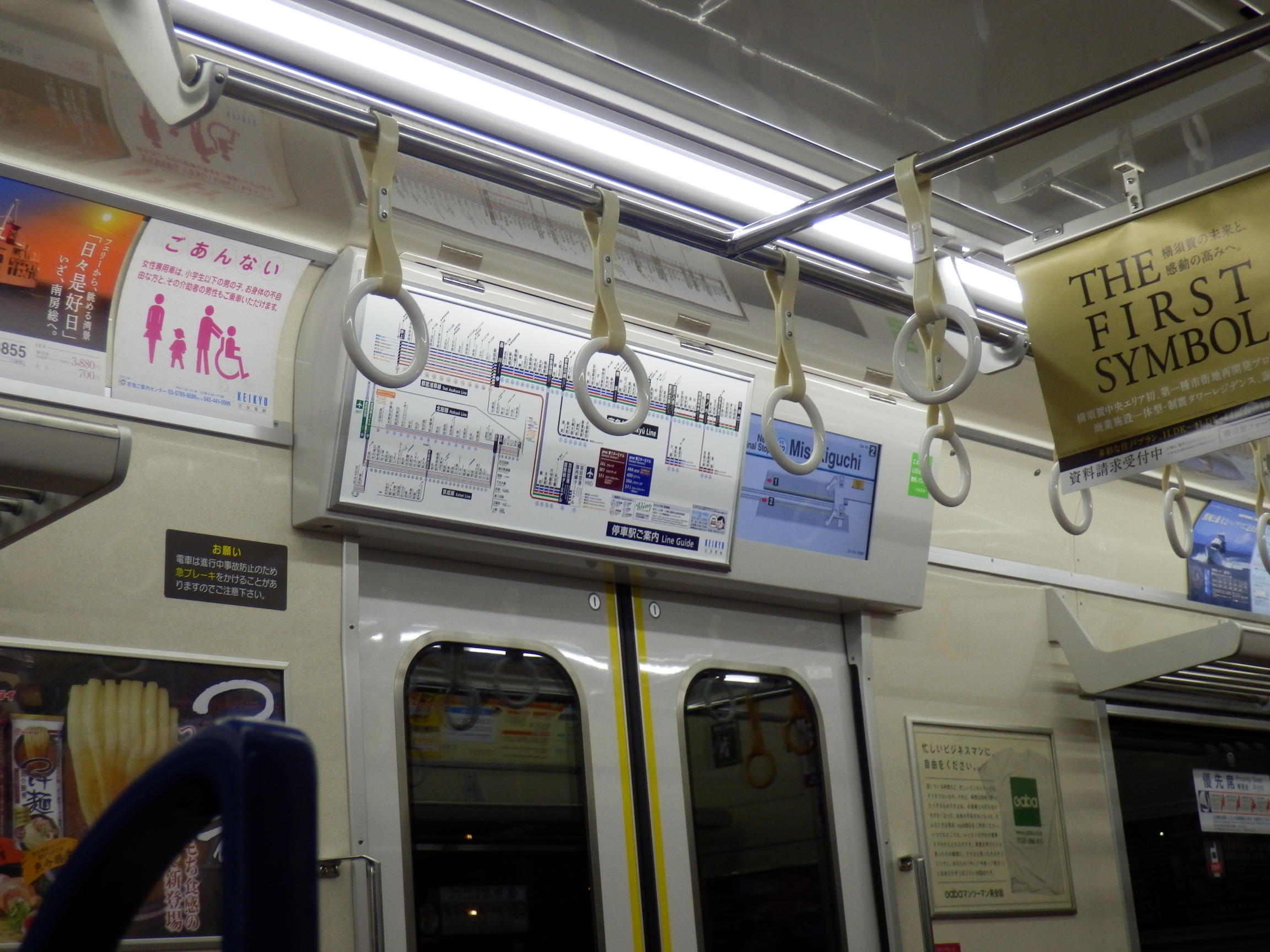
LCD passenger information display, 2013

== Livery variations ==
Set 2157 carried a "Keikyu Blue Sky Train" livery from 11 June 2005 until March 2015. From then, set 2133 inherited the "Keikyu Blue Sky Train" livery. From 21 February 2016, set 2133 operated in a modified version of its blue livery adapted to resemble the livery of Taiwan Railways Administration trains, to mark the first anniversary of the signing of a friendship agreement between Keikyu and Taiwan Railways Administration.

Keikyu collaborated with Sega to decorate a special limited-edition "Sonic the Hedgehog/Puyo Puyo" train, which ran on the Keikyū Airport Line from 14 November 2016 to 17 December 2016 to celebrate the 25th anniversary for both games. The train was part of the Keikyu 2100 series' "Keikyu Blue Sky Train" livery and featured images of Sonic characters Sonic, Tails, Knuckles, Amy, Shadow, Silver, Doctor Eggman, and Carbuncle, as well as a collection of Puyo Puyo's expressive stacking blobs. In addition, signs at the Airport Line's Ōtorii Station, the closest stop to the site of Sega's original office prior to 2018, featured special images honoring the games.

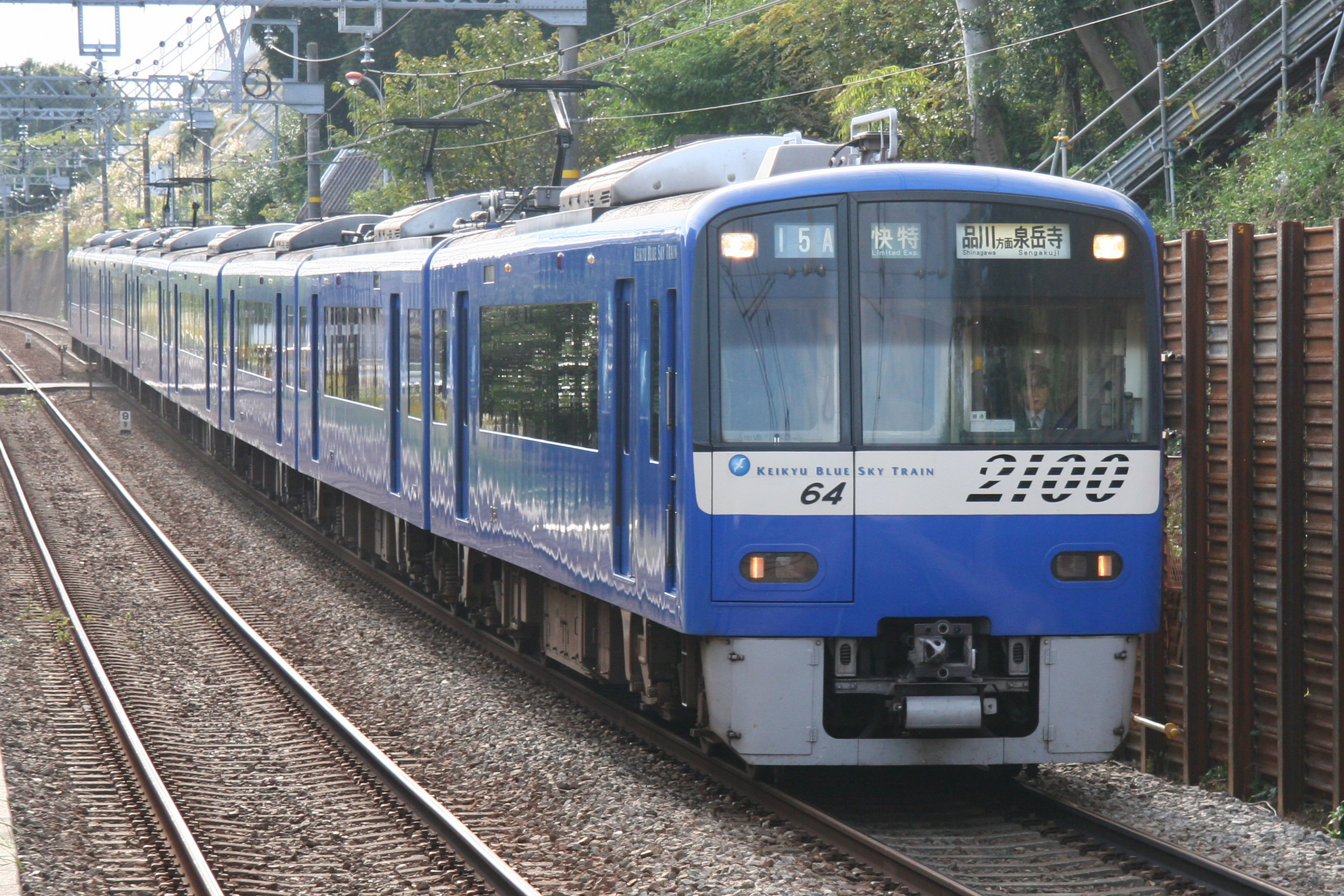
Set 2157 in "Keikyu Blue Sky Train" livery in October 2006

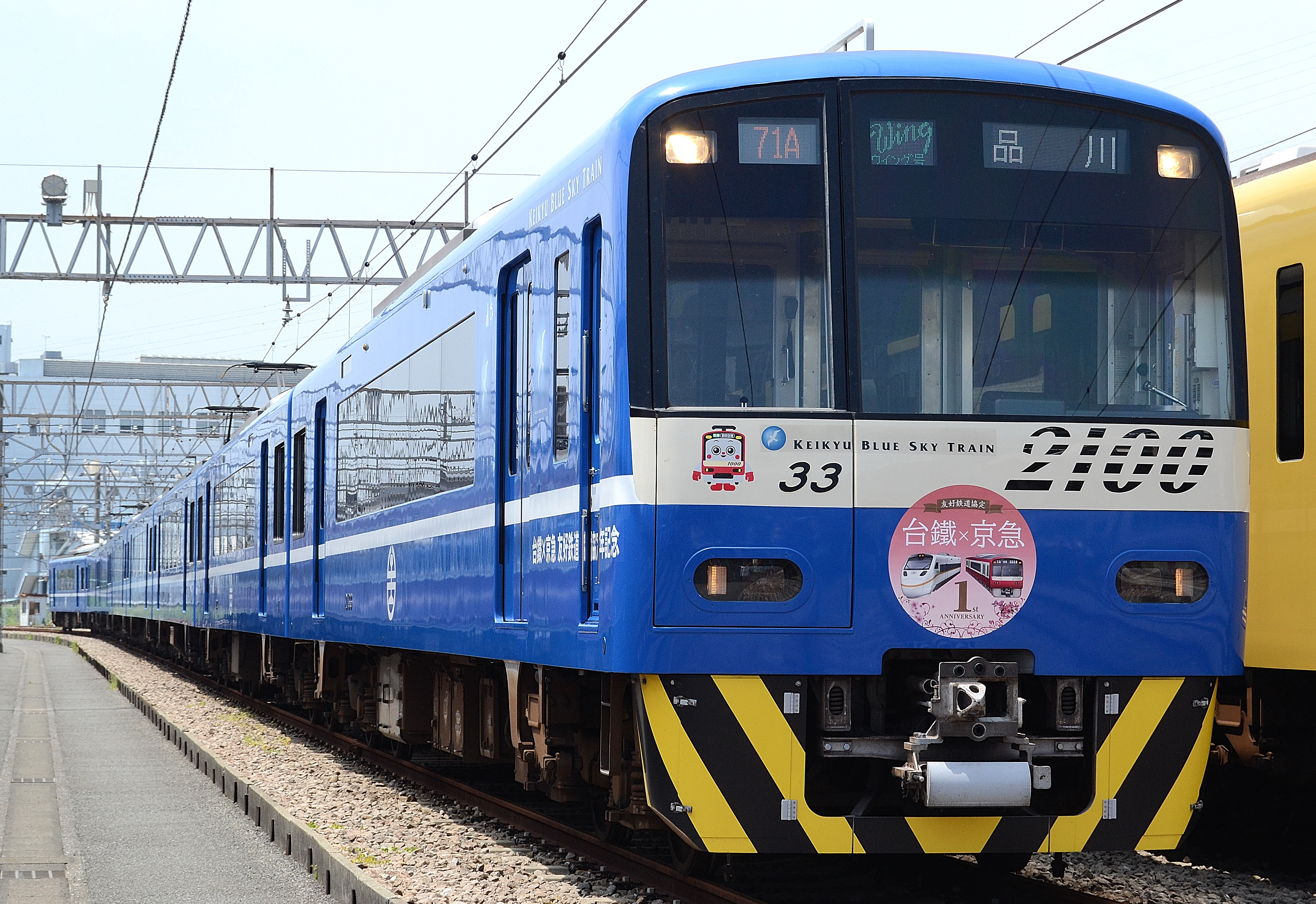
Set 2133 in "Keikyu Blue Sky Train" livery modified to resemble Taiwan Railways livery in May 2016

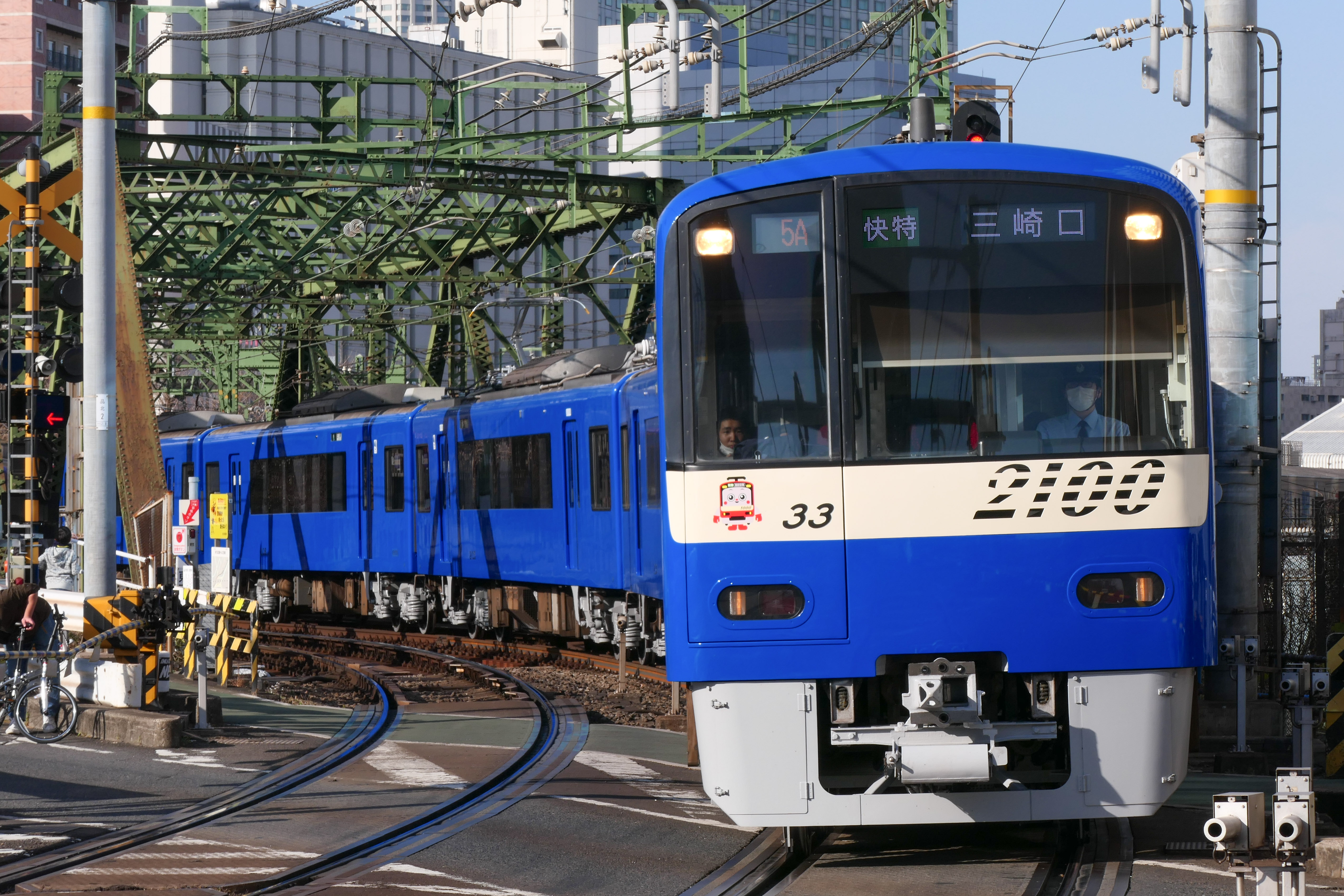
Set 2133 in "Keikyu Blue Sky Train" livery in January 2021
