= Saya Ichikawa =

Japanese-American model, tarento, and newscaster (born 1987)

- 市川 紗椰
- Born: Jennifer Saya Ichikawa Shook (シュック 市川 紗耶 ジェニファ, Shukku Ichikawa Saya Jenifa); February 14, 1987 (age 39); Nagoya, Aichi Prefecture, Japan
- Education: Waseda University
- Occupations: Model; newscaster
- Agent: Super Continental
- Height: 1.68 m (5 ft 6 in)

Saya Ichikawa (市川 紗椰, Ichikawa Saya; born 14 February 1987) is a Japanese-American model, tarento, and newscaster. Her original stage name was Saya until 2011. Her father is an American with Cherokee heritage and her mother is Japanese.

Ichikawa is represented by the agency Super Continental.

== Biography ==
Ichikawa was born in Nagoya, Aichi Prefecture, and she grew up in Detroit between the ages of four and thirteen. She was accepted to Columbia University, University of Chicago, and New York University. Ichikawa planned on attending Columbia University, but she delayed college for one year in order to focus on her modelling career. Ichikawa was scheduled to return to the United States after the one year, but she enjoyed her career and decided to stay in Japan. She later graduated from Waseda University in 2010.

Ichikawa was accepted as an exclusive model for the magazines Vivi and 25ans at the age of sixteen, and she is currently active in a number of fashion magazines. She had modeled in the magazines Sumo Fan, sweet, More, Baila, and Maquia.

In the 4 April 2016 Ichikawa became an MC in the Fuji Television informational news programme Your Time.

== Bibliography ==
=== Magazines ===
Year	Title	Notes
2003	Vivi	
2008	25ans	Exclusive model
	sweet	Regular
	More	Regular
	Baila	Regular
2011	Maquia	"Saya Ichikawa no Hon areba Koso, Bi Jinsei!"
2014	Tabi to Tetsudō	"Saya Ichikawa: Ninki Tokkyū de yukou!"
	Sumo Fan	On the cover of volumes 1 through 4
	Spur	
	King	"Saya no School of Rock"
	Miss	
	Classy	
	An an	
	VoCE	
	Nylon	
	Tokyo Girls Collection	
2017	Sumo Fan	On the cover of volume 5

=== Advertisements ===
Year	Title	Notes
2008	Wacoal Lalan	Image character
2016	Wacoal Wing Miss Slender and Tokihanatsu Bra	
	Atre	Image character
	Johnson & Johnson Johnson's body care	Image character
	Watabe Wedding	Image character
	Amu plaza kagoshima	Image character
	United Arrows Green Label	Image character
	Tobu Railway Ajute	Image character
	Anfamie	Image character
	Isetan Girl	Image character

=== Jacket photos ===
Year	Title	Notes	Ref.
2015	Spicy Chocolate "Miscasting feat. Takuya Ohashi (Sukima Switch) & Reitaro Kimyo"	Limited single	

== Publications ==
=== Music ===
Year	Title
2015	"Yoru ga Aketara"

=== Charms ===
Year	Title
2007	Torez: Kōun o Yobikomu Lucky Charm 13 no Mahō yo, Todoke!

=== Photobooks ===
Year	Title
2004	Seishun Tokyo School Girl
2008	Gekkan Saya
2008	Gekkan 100 Anniversary
2015	Yoru ga Aketara

=== Books ===
Year	Title
2007	Model Life
2012	Saya Ichikawa no Dokudashi "Bichō" Smoothie
2013	Cookie Fortune Love 2013 Spring / Summer Collection

== Filmography ==
=== Films ===
Year	Title	Role	Notes	Ref.
2025	Beethoven Fabrication	Harriet Ries		

=== TV series ===
News programmes

Year	Title	Network	Notes
2015	Houdou Kyoku 24	NotTV, Fuji TV on Demand	Main caster from Wednesdays and Thursdays
2016	Your Time	Fuji TV	Main caster in Weekdays
2016	Ashita no Compass	Fuji TV	Weekday late appearances

Informal programmes

Year	Title	Network	Notes
2007	Tokyo Kawaii TV	NHK-G	Regular appearances
2014	Hiru Bura	NHK-G	Reporter

Music programmes

Year	Title	Network	Notes
2013	Mirai Teiban Kyoku	TVK, BS12 TV, TV Saitama, Tochigi TV, GTV	Personality

Cultural programmes

Year	Title	Network	Notes
2007	Harisenbon Eikaiwa Juku	Fuji TV	
2010	Mezase! Kaisha no Hoshi	NHK-E	Guest
2011	3-kagetsu Topic Eikaiwa: Marugoto Taikan! Hawaiian Rojas	NHK-E	
2012	Kokoro to Karada Mitsuru Toki ofu	NHK BS Premium	
2014	Kaigyō 100-nen! Anata no Shiranai Tokyo Eki: Otona no Shakai Kengaku	NHK BS Premium	
2014	Nippon Sengo Subculture-shi	NHK BS Premium	
2015	The Premium: Odoroki! Nippon no Sokojikara	NHK BS Premium	
2015	The Profiler	NHK BS Premium	
2015	Sekai no Meisaku	BS Asahi	

Variety programmes

Year	Title	Network	Notes
2014	Tamori Club	TV Asahi	Quasi-regular appearances
2014	Ariyoshi-kun no Shōjiki sanpo	Fuji TV	Regular guest appearances
2015	Kumiko Okae ga Iku! Rekishi to Zekkei no Kaga Hyakumangoku Onna Futaritabi-hen	BS-TBS	
2015	Tokyo Design TV	BS NTV	5th MC
2015	Ī Otona ga Hamaru Sekai	BeeTV	MC
2015	Peace Matayoshi no fumi Komi En	NTV	MC
2015	Suppin House	TBS	MC
2016	Manatsu no Mystery Tokuban: Nazotoki wa Sk-Per! no Naka de	BS Sk Per	MC

=== Radio ===
Year	Title	Network	Notes
2012	Hello World	J-Wave	
2013	I A.M.	J-Wave	"Close To You"
2015	The Top 5	TBS Radio	Season 5; Thursday appearances

=== Music videos ===
Year	Title	Ref.
2009	Base Ball Bear "Breeeeze Girl"	

== Others ==
=== Charity activities ===
Year	Title
2009	JOICFP no Project Chiku Zambia o Shisatsu
2012	Kate Spade no Tōhoku Shien Project "Support Japan" no Project Chiku

=== Lectures ===
Year	Title
2013	Women's Magazine in Aogaku 2013: Model Saya Ichikawa no Bichō Smoothie de Hajimeru "Chō Katsu" Lesson
