= Japan Railfan Magazine =

Japanese-language monthly magazine

- February 1999 cover showing a renewed 381 series
- Categories: Rail transport
- Frequency: Monthly
- First issue: 1961
- Company: Koyusha
- Country: Japan
- Language: Japanese
- Website: www.railf.jp

Japan Railfan Magazine (鉄道ファン, Tetsudō Fan) is a Japanese-language monthly magazine for railfans covering the mainly Japanese railways published by Koyusha. It has been published in Japan since 1961. Issues go on sale on the 21st of each month, two months before the cover month (e.g. the March issue is on sale on 21 January). Each copy sells for between ¥1,100 and ¥1,200, depending on the number of pages. The magazine reports on railway prototypes, complete with technical plans, photos, maps, graphs, and tables.

== See also ==
- List of railroad-related periodicals
