= Super Bell"Z =

Japanese musical group

- Origin: Hokkaido, Japan
- Genres: Synth-pop
- Label: Toshiba EMI

Super Bell"Z (read "Super Bellz") is a group known for its "DJ Train Conductor" songs in which they lay sounds of trains, station fuss, etc., and voice recorded to resemble train announcements over hip hop beats. They were under contract with Toshiba-EMI, but in 2005 they went independent.

Their first single, "MOTER MAN (Akihabara ~ Minami-Urawa)", was such a hit that it was followed up with a whole "MOTO(e)R MAN" series. Since 2003 they have performed live at Seibu Railway's annual "Seibu Train Festa" event, for which they also created a mock sentai group called "Leo Rangers" whose costumes are designed to look like trains in Seibu's lineup.

== Members ==
- Nozuki Takahiro

Born 1972-05-22 in Obihiro, Hokkaidō. He creates the DJ Train Conductor tracks and does additional vocals. His character in Leo Rangers is modeled after the Seibu 10000 series.

- Shōkaku Hajime

Born December, 1972 in Hokkaidō. Sings chorus and plays keyboard. His character in Leo Rangers is modeled after the Seibu 20000 series.

- Nakajima Hiroki a.k.a. "Nakaji"

Born 1975-06-09 in Saitama Prefecture. Plays electric guitar. His character in Leo Rangers is modeled after the Seibu 3000 series.

== History ==
- 1999-12-08 debuts with Moter Man (Akihabara~Minami Urawa)
- 2000 wins 33rd USEN Award for Best New Artists for MOTER MAN (Akihabara~Minami Urawa)
- 2005 leaves Toshiba-EMI to go independent

== Discography ==
Many of their albums have the combined name of Motor Man and Moter Man, which is written with an 'e' inside an 'o.' They are therefore written here as "MOTO(e)R MAN."

=== Singles ===
- MOTER MAN (Akihabara~Minami Urawa) (1999-12-08) - first single
- 老・ラッパー [Old Rapper] (2000-09-13)
- MOTO(e)R MAN Vol.3 Sendai & Keihin Kyūkō (2001-02-21)
- Formula Man (2001-08-29)
- MOTO(e)R MAN Chuo-sen/Shinkansen Hikari (2002-01-30)
- MOTO(e)R MAN Enoden & Rikuu East Line (2003-06-25 CCCD)
- 鉄道戦隊 レオ☆レンジャー [Railroad Sentai Leo Rangers] (2003-12-17 CCCD)
- かいじ101号 [Kaiji No. 101] (2004-09-29 CCCD)

=== Albums ===
- MOTO(e)R MAN (2000-02-23)
- MOTO(e)R MAN Vol.2 (2000-07-19)
- スーパーベルズファン [SUPER BELL"Z Fan] (2000-10-25) - the CD booklet is a parody of the Japanese magazine Japan Railfan Magazine
- MOTER MAN Yamanote Line "Loop Complete!" (2002-03-27)
- MOTO(e)R MAN Hayate&Saikyo Line WATER FRONT (2002-11-30)
- MOTO(e)R MANでGO! [Let's Go by MOTO(e)R MAN!] (2004-06-23 CCCD) - The title song "MOTO(e)R MANでGO!" was used as the theme song of the Taito game Let's Go by Train!FINAL.
- Very Best Of MOTO(e)R MAN (2005-06-15 CCCD) - includes three new songs

=== Videos ===
- アイアンテクノ(仮) [Iron Techno (Unofficial)] (2002-06-26). The "(Unofficial)" is part of the title; it is not unofficial.
- 実写版! 鉄道戦隊レオ☆レンジャー [On the Spot! Railroad Sentai Leo Rangers] (2004-03-31)

=== Books ===
- Nozuki, Takahiro (2000). MOTO(e)R MAN. Keibunsha. p. 221 pages. ISBN 4-7669-3450-4.
